= Defence Act of 1925 (Sweden) =

The Defence Act of 1925 was a defence act passed by the Swedish Riksdag on 26 May 1925 and came into force on 1 January 1928. The Act specified how the Swedish Armed Forces would operate during the coming years. The Act resulted in a policy of disarmament. The Act would remain effective until the Defence Act of 1936.

The new order of battle meant that the number of Army Divisions was decreased to 4. 17 military units were disbanded and conscription time was lowered to 140 days for most conscripts. Many conscripts were transferred to the Army Reserve. The Army and Naval air powers were combined into the Swedish Air Force.

== Background ==
The Edén Cabinet had in 1919 started an investigation into the Swedish Armed Forces in order to lower the high defence expenditure the Defence Act of 1914 had resulted in. The investigation concluded in 1923 and the right-wing majority had decided on an expenditure cap of 120 million Swedish crowns per year, 62 million less than the Defence Act of 1914 stipulated.

The political parties all made differing judgements on how large of a war force Sweden needed. The political right claimed that Russia represented a long-term threat to Sweden, and that Russia's political and economic troubles during the 1920s were just temporary. They also believed - due to Sweden's entry in to the League of Nations - that the risk of Sweden being dragged in to war had increased.

The liberal Free-minded National Association referred to the weakened powers of Germany and Russia, the creation of the League of Nations and the war exhaustion that many nations were suffering through as a result of the First World War. The Free-minded had major hopes for international treaties regarding disarmament.

The Social Democrats predicted a sustained and stable period of peace, which did not motivate a strong defence in order to counter surprise attacks. A war in Europe would be preceded by worsened international relations and thus give time for necessary rearmament. The Social Democrats believed that Sweden only needed to maintain neutrality in order to deflect foreign aggression.

The proposition on a future defence encountered multiple setbacks during its discussion in the Riksdag, but in 1925, the Social Democratic Sandler Cabinet agreed to a mainly Freeminder-backed proposal which involved a further decreased expenditure cap of 107 million crowns per year, equivalent to roughly 1,3 % of the Swedish GDP.

== Reorganisation ==
Army

- The number of army divisions was reduced from six to four.
- The cavalry was reduced from 50 to 12 companies,
- The infantry was reduced from 364 to 122 companies;
- Every infantry regiment had their third battalion dissolved.
- The Army Service Troops were reduced from 18 to 12 companies.
- The engineering troops were reduced from 32 to 22 companies.
- The number of supply companies was reduced from four to three companies.
- Two armoured companies were established at Göta Life Guards (I 2).

Navy

The construction of new ships was cut which resulted in the older ships not being replaced. In 1927, the Navy was starting to focus on lighter units in order to outnumber the heavier armoured cruisers.

Coastal artillery

The inner lines at Vaxholm Fortress, Älvsborg Fortress and Hemsö Fortress were returned to storage and the Älvsborg Coastal Artillery Regiment (KA 3), Hörningsholm Fortress and Luleå Coastal Position were dissolved.

Army and naval air forces

The Swedish Air Force is formed as a separate military branch, through a merge of the air forces of the Army and Navy, consisting of 57 aircraft.

== Disbanded military units ==
Many units which remained received new unit designations, i.e. the Northern Småland Regiment became I 12.

- A 5 – Uppland Artillery Regiment
- A 9 – Positional Artillery Regiment
- I 2 – Göta Life Guards
- I 4 – 1st Life Grenadier Regiment
- I 5 – 2nd Life Grenadier Regiment
- I 6 – Västgöta Regiment
- I 7 – Karlskrona Grenadier Regiment
- I 12 – Jönköping Regiment
- I 18 – Västmanland Regiment
- I 21 – Kalmar Regiment
- I 26 – Vaxholm Grenadier Regiment
- Int 4 – Sollefteå Supply Company
- K 1 – Life Guards of Horse
- K 2 – Life Regiment Dragoons
- K 4 – Småland Hussar Regiment
- K 5 – Scanian Hussar Regiment
- K 6 – Scanian Dragoon Regiment
- K 7 – Crown Prince's Hussar Regiment
- T 5 – Västmanland Logistic Corps
- T 6 – Östgöta Logistic Corps

== Established military units ==
- F 1 – First Air Corps
- F 2 – Second Air Corps
- F 3 – Third Air Corps
- F 4 – Fourth Air Corps
- F 5 – Swedish Air Force Flying School
- I 2 – Göta Life Guards
- I 4 – Life Grenadier Regiment
- I 12 – Jönköping-Kalmar Regiment
- K 1 – Life Regiment of Horse
- K 2 – Scanian Cavalry Regiment

== Remaining military units ==
The Act meant that the Swedish Army in peace time were to consist of the following units from 1 January 1928. One of the major changes was that the infantry regiments were to only consist of two battalions instead of three.

=== Infantry ===
- Svea Life Guards, Stockholm
- Göta Life Guards, Stockholm
- Life Regiment Grenadiers, Örebro
- Life Grenadier Regiment, Linköping
- Uppland Regiment, Uppsala
- Skaraborg Regiment, Skövde
- Södermanland Regiment, Strängnäs
- Kronoberg Regiment, Växjö
- Jönköping-Kalmar Regiment, Eksjö
- Dalarna Regiment, Falun
- Hälsinge Regiment, Gävle
- Älvsborg Regiment, Borås
- Halland Regiment, Halmstad
- Bohuslän Regiment, Uddevalla
- Norrbotten Regiment, Boden
- Västerbotten Regiment, Umeå
- Värmland Regiment, Karlstad
- Jämtland Ranger Regiment, Östersund
- North Scanian Infantry Regiment, Kristianstad
- South Scanian Infantry Regiment, Ystad
- Västernorrland Regiment, Sollefteå
- Gotland Infantry Corps, Visby

=== Artillery ===
- Svea Artillery Regiment, Stockholm
- Göta Artillery Regiment, Gothenburg
- Wendes Artillery Regiment, Kristianstad
- Norrland Artillery Corps, Östersund
- Gotland Artillery Corps, Visby
- Norrbotten Artillery Corps, Boden
- Army Artillery Regiment, Jönköping
- Anti-Air Artillery Regiment, Karlsborg
- Boden Artillery Regiment, Boden

=== Supply Troops ===
- First Supply Company, Stockholm
- Second Supply Company, Karlsborg
- Third Supply Company, Boden

=== Engineer Troops ===
- Svea Engineer Corps, Stockholm
- Göta Engineer Corps, Eksjö
- Boden Engineer Regiment, Boden
- Field Telegraph Corps, Stockholm

=== Service Troops ===
- Svea Logistic Corps, Linköping
- Göta Logistic Corps, Skövde
- Norrland Logistic Corps, Sollefteå
- Scanian Logistic Corps, Hässleholm

=== Cavalry ===
- Life Regiment of Horse, Stockholm
- Life Regiment Hussars, Skövde
- Scanian Cavalry Regiment, Helsingborg
- Norrland Dragoon Regiment, Umeå
