= Östgöta Logistic Corps =

Former corps of the Swedish Army

- Östgöta trängkår
- Active: 1902–1927
- Country: Sweden
- Allegiance: Swedish Armed Forces
- Branch: Swedish Army
- Type: Service Troops
- Size: Corps
- Part of: 1st Military District (1902–1907); 2nd Army Division (1907–1927)
- Garrison/HQ: Linköping
- Colors: Blue and white
- March: "Östgöta trängkårs marsch" (Ferry) (Note: The unit marsch was adopted circa 1905.)

Insignia
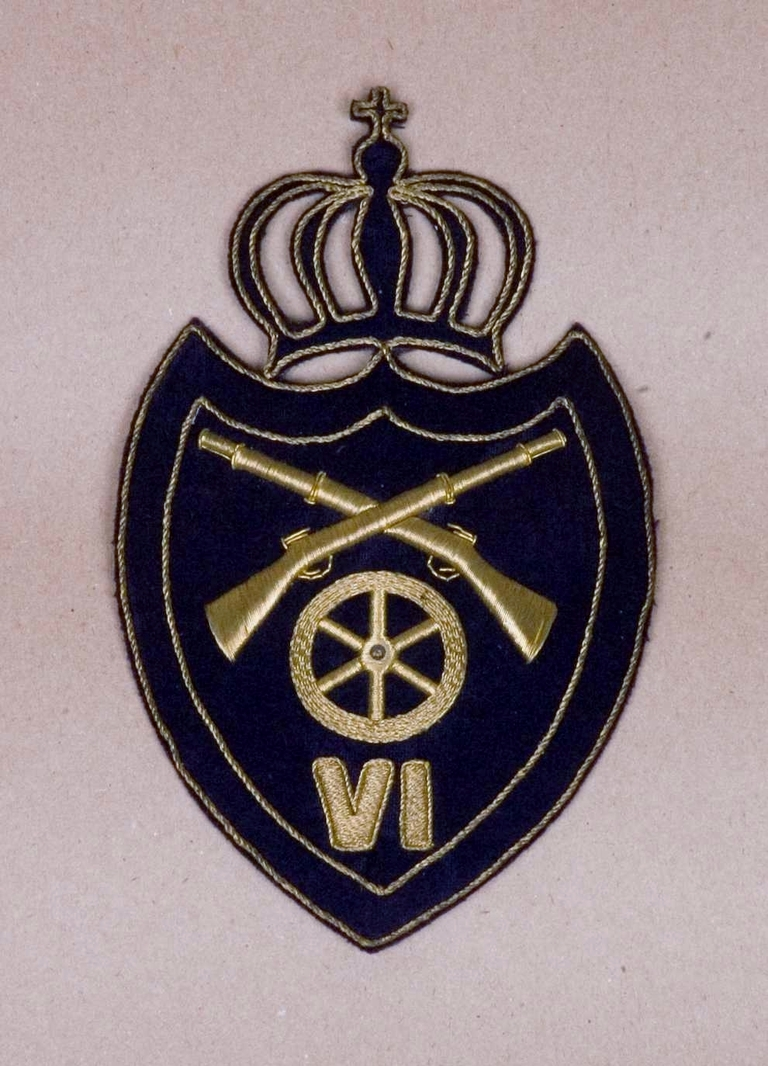
- Shoulder sleeve insignia

The Östgöta Logistic Corps (Swedish: Östgöta trängkår, T 6) was a Swedish Army logistic corps operating between 1902 and 1927. The unit was for the longest time based in Linköping.

== History ==
Östgöta Logistic Corps was formed as the 2nd Göta Logistic Corps (No 6), according to the 1901 Riksdag decision. The corps belonged to the 2nd Army Division. The corps was raised in November 1902 at Wendes Logistic Corps in Landskrona. The corps was initially placed in this corps' barracks. Its 1st Logistic Company was formed in 1902 and in the summer of 1903 the first enlisted conscripts enrolled. In the autumn of 1904, the 2nd Logistic Company and the 3rd Medical Company were formed. In December of the same year, the corps received the name Östgöta Logistic Corps. On 1 January 1907, the corps received its own commander. Before that, it had been commanded by the commander of the Wendes Logistic Corps. By General Order 1377–1906, it was decided that the corps would be temporarily located in Ränneslätt next to Eksjö in Småland Hussar Regiment's (Smålands husarregemente) old barracks. On 30 August 1907, the move took place from Scania. The next change in the units' history took place through the ordinance of 11 October 1907, when the treasury affairs were separated from matters concerning provisioning, quartermaster equipment and suchlike. This meant that the Administration Department was divided into six new departments and one Cash Administration. In December 1911, the corps finally reached its final location, when they moved into newly built barracks in Linköping.

In connection with the Defence Act of 1925, it was intended that two logistic corps would be disbanded. The corps in question were Västmanland Logistic Corps (T 5) and Östgöta Logistic Corps (T 6). However, Östgöta Logistic Corps was not a completely given candidate for disbandment, as it was considered to have a better location compared to what Svea Logistic Corps had. The decision was that the oldest corps would remain, which was Svea Logistic Corps. As a compromise in the matter, it was decided that Svea Logistic Corps would be relocated from Örebro to Linköping and take over Östgöta Logistic Corps's barracks. The latter corps was disbanded on 31 December 1927. In the autumn of 1927, the relocation of Svea Logistic Corps began and on 1 June 1928, the triple-tailed flag was hauled for the last time at Västra Mark in Örebro. Only four officers accompanied the move. On the other hand, the majority of the employees at Östgöta Logistic Corps remained in corresponding positions at Svea Logistic Corps.

== Locations and training areas ==
When the unit was formed, it was placed in the same barracks as Wendes Logistic Corps at Slottsgatan in Landskrona. On 21 August 1907, the unit was relocated to Ränneslätt, where they took over the camp that Småland Hussar Regiment (Smålands husarregemente) had left before their move to Eksjö. However, the move to Ränneslätt was only temporary, when the unit was relocated on 19 December 1911 to Kaserngatan in Linköping, where a completely new barracks area had been built. From 1 January 1928, the barracks area was taken over by the Svea Logistic Corps. The barracks area was completely abandoned on 1 July 1985, when Svea Logistic Corps was co-located with other units at Regementsgatan in Linköping.

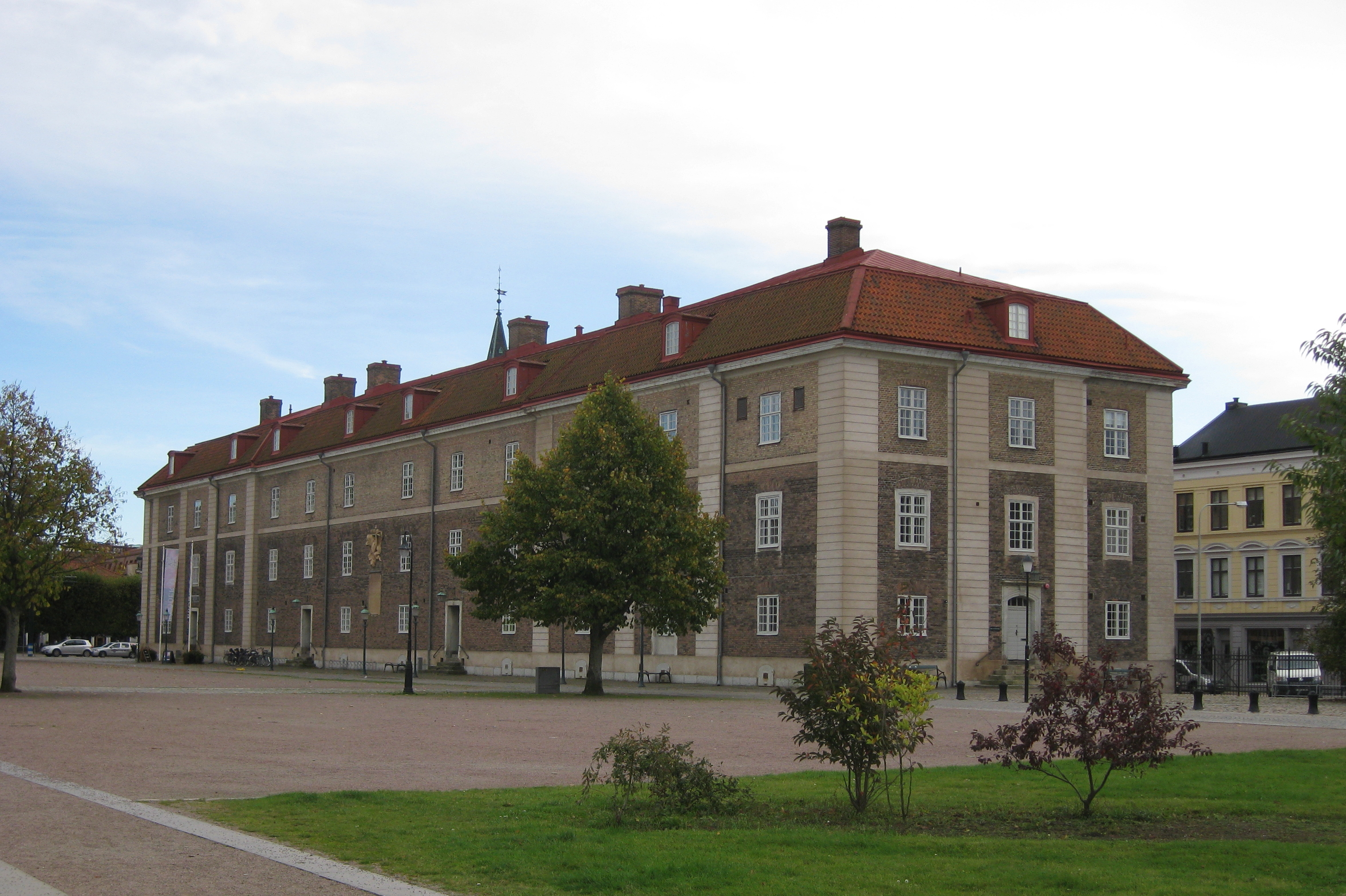
Barracks in Landskrona

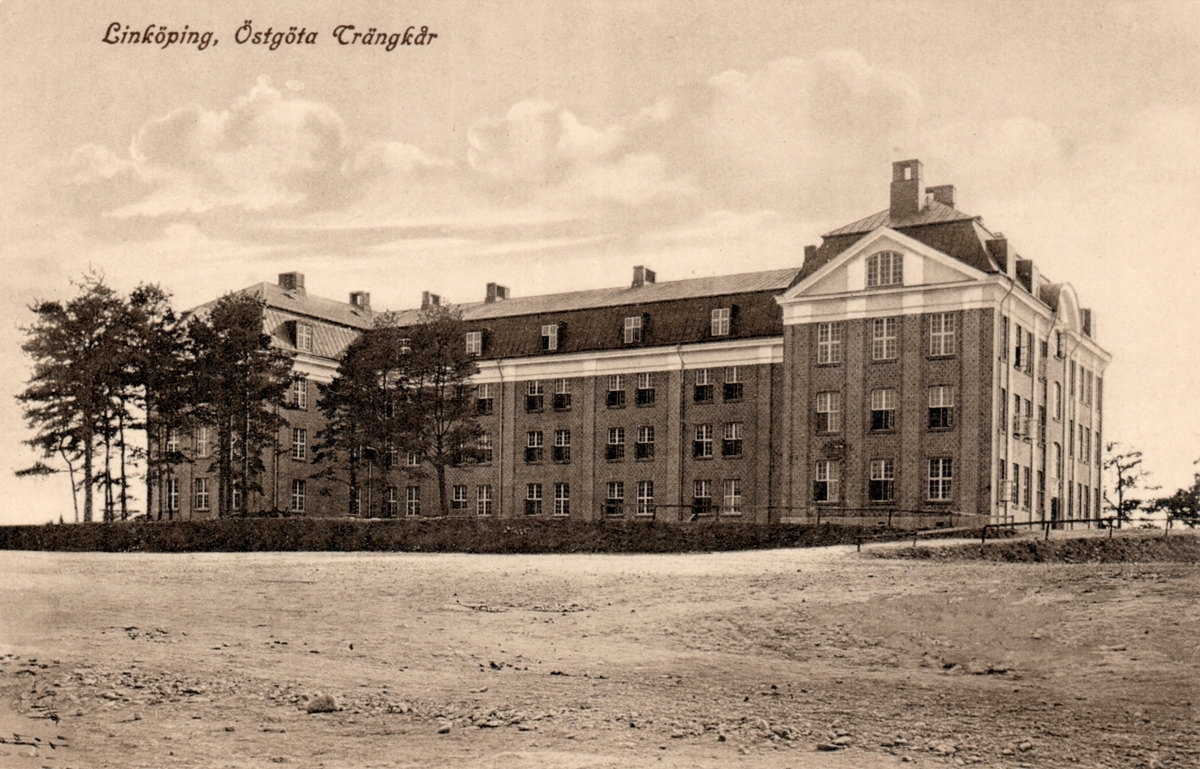
Barracks in Linköping

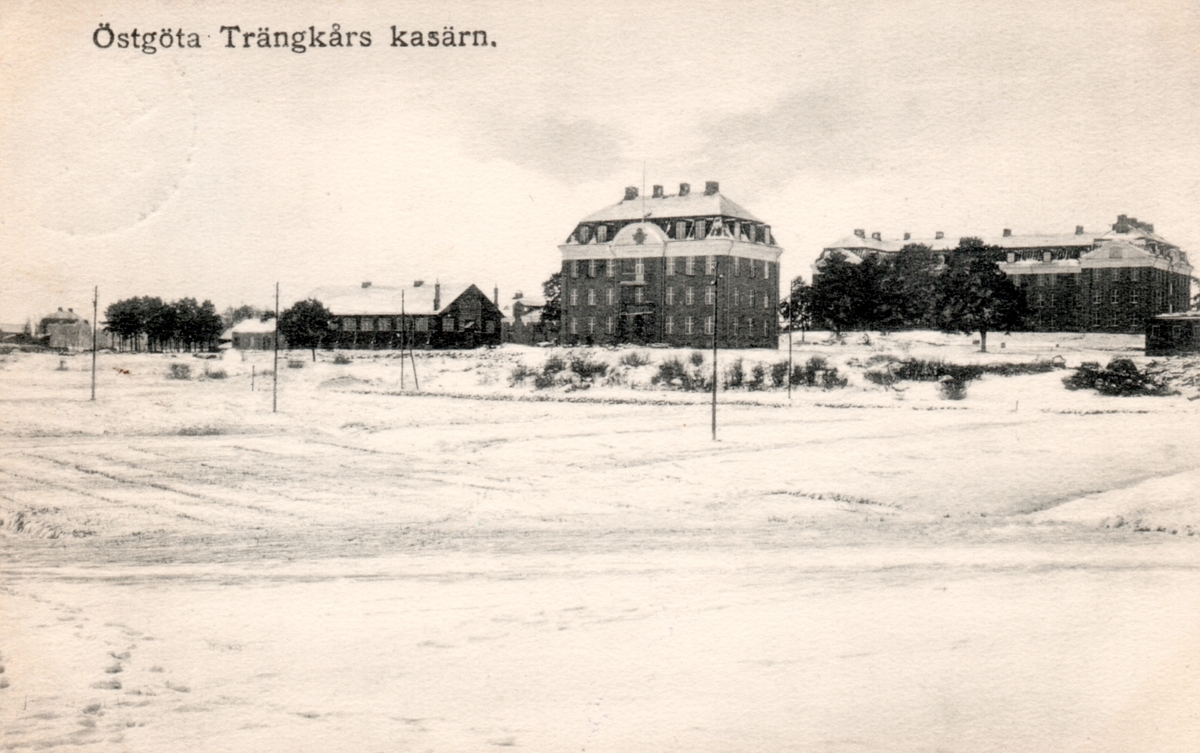
Barracks in Linköping

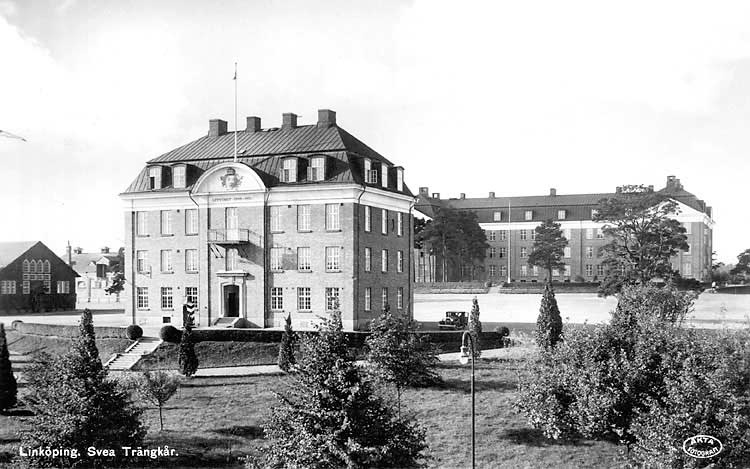
Chancellery building in Linköping

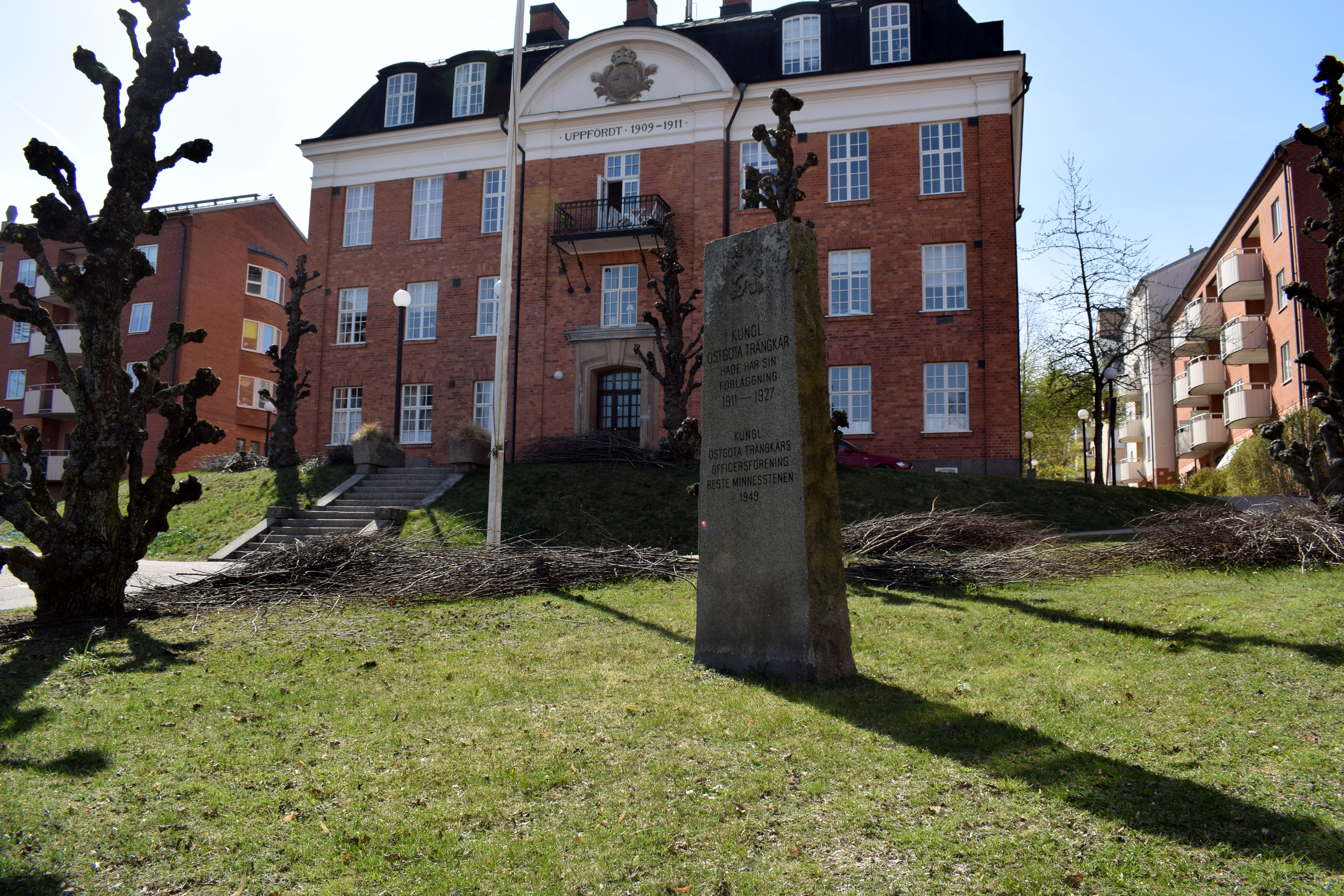
Chancellery building in Linköping with memorial stone

== Commanding officers ==
- 1902–1907: Ivar Virgin
- 1907–1917: Karl Sterner
- 1917–1919: Knut Palm
- 1919–1927: Axel Engdahl

== Names, designations and locations ==
Note: The word träng ("train") as in trängregemente is translated to either "train", "service force"; "transport"; "baggage"; "supply vehicles" pl.; (Br) "army service corps", (US) "maintenance and supply troops", "transportation" (adj.), or "logistic".

Name	Translation	From		To
Kungl. Andra Göta trängkår	2nd Royal Göta Logistic Corps	1902-10-01	–	1904-12-07
Kungl. Östgöta trängkår	Royal Östgöta Logistic Corps	1904-12-08	–	1927-12-31
Designation		From		To
No 6		1902-10-01	–	1914-09-30
T 6		1914-10-01	–	1927-12-31
Location		From		To
Landskrona Garrison		1902-10-01	–	1907-08-20
Ränneslätt		1907-08-21	–	1911-12-18
Linköping Garrison		1911-12-19	–	1927-12-31

== See also ==
- List of Swedish logistic regiments
