= Svea Logistic Corps =

Former corps of the Swedish Army

- Svea trängkår
- Active: 1891–1997
- Country: Sweden
- Allegiance: Swedish Armed Forces
- Branch: Swedish Army
- Type: Service Troops
- Size: Corps
- Part of: 5th Military District (1891–1893); 4th Army Division (1893–1901); IV Army Division (1902–1927); Eastern Brigade (1928–1937); IV Army Division (1938–1942); IV.milo (1942–1966); Milo Ö (1966–1985); I 4 (1985–1994); Milo M (1994–1997)
- Garrison/HQ: Linköping
- Colors: Blue and white
- March: "Svea trängkårs marsch" (Bergendahl) (Note: The march was established in 1953 by Army Order 33/1953.)

Insignia
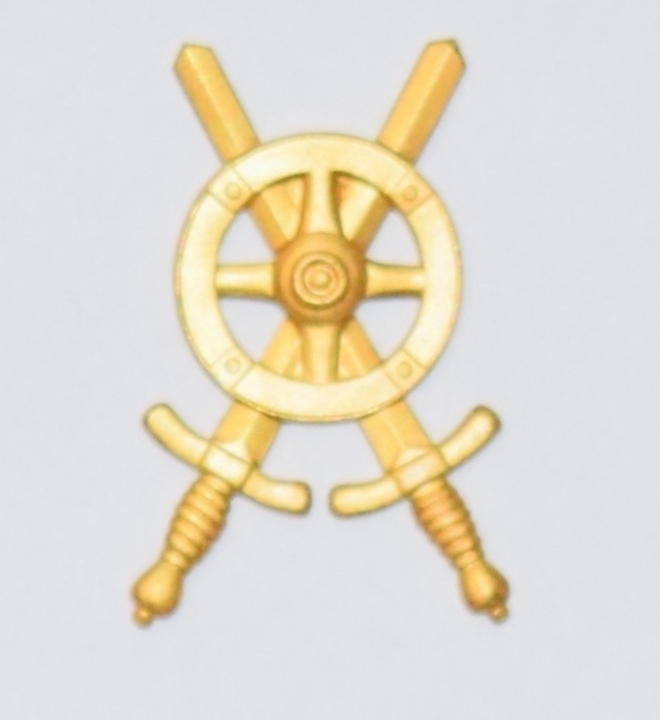
- Branch insignia

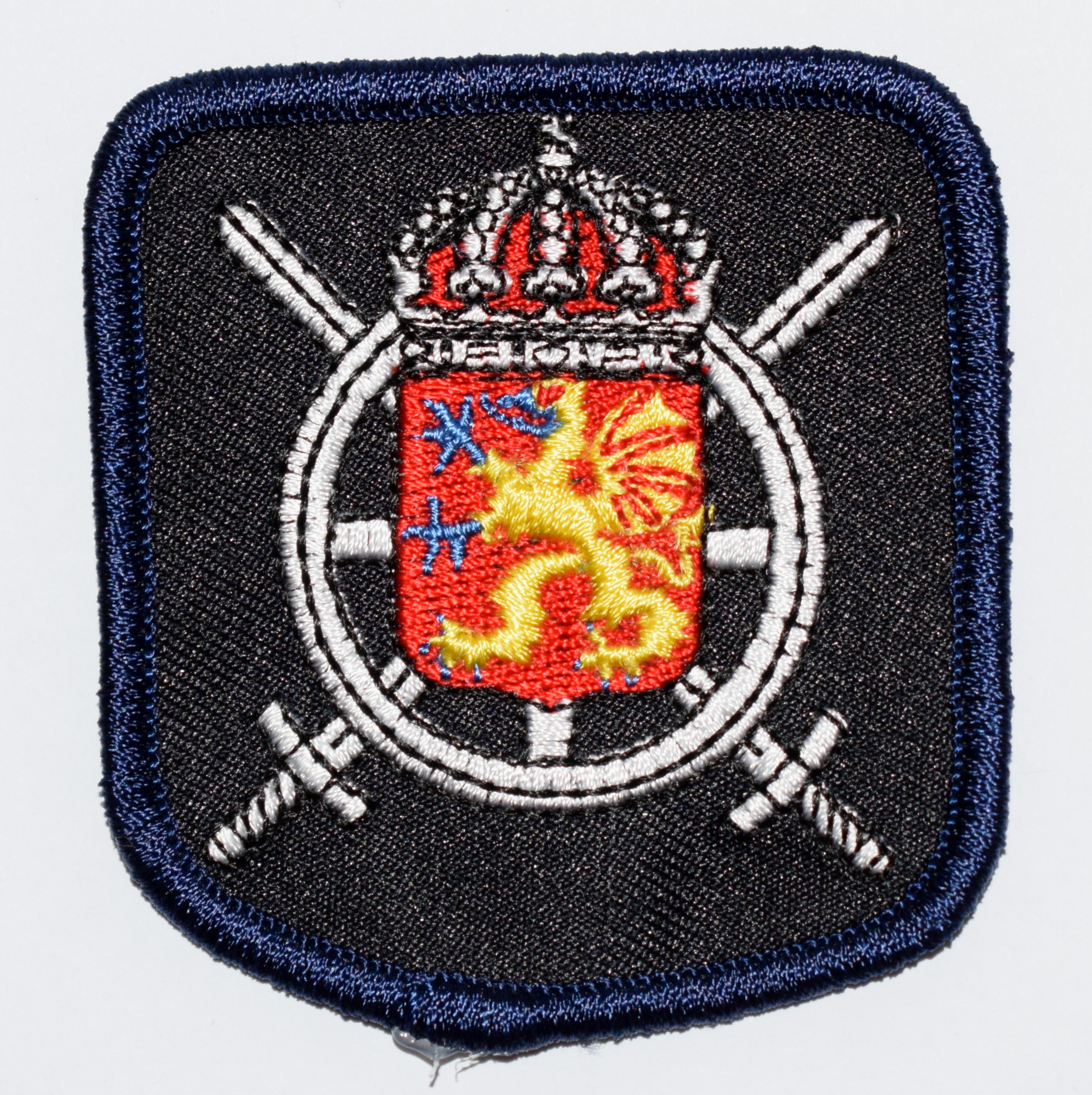
- Shoulder sleeve insignia

The Svea Logistic Corps (Swedish: Svea trängkår, T 1) was a Swedish Army logistic corps operating between 1891 and 1997. The unit was based in Linköping.

== History ==
The unit has its origins in the Logistic Battalion (Trängbataljonen) which was divided in 1891 into two battalions, Svea Logistic Battalion (T 1) and Göta Logistic Battalion (T 2). Svea Logistic Battalion took over the camp that the Logistic Battalion had had at the Higher Artillery School's (Högre artilleriläroverket) previous premises in Marieberg in Stockholm. In 1893, the battalion raised the Norrland Logistic Battalion (T 3), which was relocated to Fredrikshov Castle in Östermalm, Stockholm before the battalion was relocated to Sollefteå in 1898. In 1902, the battalion was organized as the 1st Svea Logistic Corps (T 1). In connection with the name change, the corps began to raise the 2nd Svea Logistic Corps. In 1904 the corps regained the name Svea Logistic Corps at the same time as the 2nd Svea Logistic Corps was given the name Västmanland Logistic Corps (T 5) and in 1907 was relocated to Salbohed.

In 1903, it was decided that the Svea Logistic Battalion would be relocated to Örebro. The corps left Marieberg in 1907 and moved into newly built barracks at Västra Mark in Örebro. In connection with the Defence Act of 1925, it was intended that two logistic corps would be disbanded. The corps in question were Västmanland Logistic Corps (T 5) and Östgöta Logistic Corps (T 6). However, Östgöta Logistic Corps was not a completely given candidate, as it had a better location than Svea Logistic Corps had. However, the decision was made that the oldest corps would remain. As a compromise in the matter, it was decided that Svea Logistic Corps would be relocated from Örebro to Linköping and take over Östgöta Logistic Corps' barracks. In the autumn of 1927, the relocation of Svea Logistic Corps began and on 1 June 1928, the Swedish war flag was hauled for the last time at Västra Mark in Örebro. Only four officers accompanied the move. Most of the employees at Östgöta Logistic Corps, on the other hand, remained in their positions.

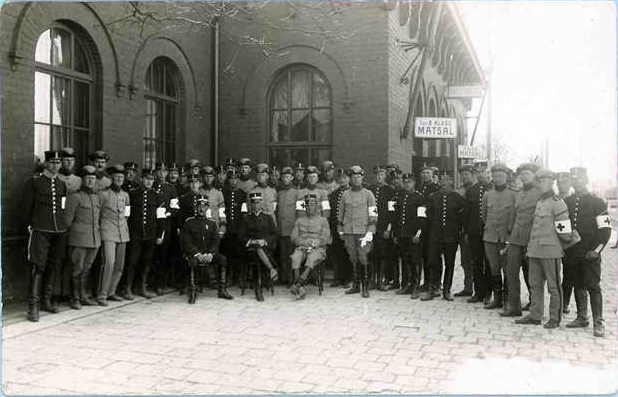
Medical platoon from Svea Logistic Corps (T 1) at Hallsberg station in the early 1920s.

Through the Defence Act of 1948, the Riksdag decided to disband the Ordnance Troops (Tygtrupperna) and the Quartermaster Troops (Intendenturtrupperna) as separate service branches. The constituent units were amalgamated into the Swedish Army Service Troops between 1948 and 1951. In 1949, the 1st Ordnance Company (Första tygkompaniet, Tyg 1) and in 1951, the 1st Quartermaster Company (Första intendenturkompaniet, Int 1) were added. Through that reorganization, the corps was raised to a regiment, and the name Svea Logistic Regiment was assigned (T 1). In connection with the OLLI reform which was carried out in the Swedish Armed Forces between the years 1973 and 1975, the Life Grenadier Regiment (I 4) was amalgamated with Östergötland Defence District (Östergötlands försvarsområde, Fo 41) and formed in 1975 the defence district regiment (försvarsområdesregemente) I 4/Fo 41. This meant that the Svea Logistic Regiment, which was part of Östergötland Defence District, became a B unit (training regiment), and its mobilization and materiel responsibility was transferred to the Life Grenadier Regiment, which became an A unit (defence district regiment).

In the Defence Act of 1982, it was decided that the regiment would be disbanded no later than 1987. The decision was changed to instead reduce the regiment to a training battalion, to be incorporated on 1 July 1985 under the name Svea Logistic Battalion within the Life Grenadier Regiment (I 4). However, the decision to leave the barracks on Kaserngatan remained, and the Svea Logistic Battalion was relocated to Regementsgatan. From being a training regiment with seven training companies, the new organization came to consist of a staff and three training companies. The barracks that were left were later rebuilt into a residential area, T 1. Barracks have today given space to tenants and the old sports hall on Överstegatan houses the Nike gymnasts. In 1994, the battalion was separated from the Life Grenadier Regiment, and from 1 July of the same year became a training unit in the Middle Military District (Milo M), under the name Svea Logistic Corps (T 1) and with the same base. Through the Defence Act of 1996, it was decided that the corps, together with all units within the Linköping Garrison, would be disbanded no later than 31 December 1997. Svea Logistic Corps had its disbandment ceremony on 23 August 1997, of which the remaining parts were transferred to a decommissioning organization.

== Locations ==
When the unit was formed in 1891, the camp was taken over from the Logistic Battalion (Trängbataljonen) in Marieberg, Stockholm. On 4 October 1907, the unit was relocated to Örebro. Through the Defence Act of 1925, the unit came to operate from Linköping on 1 January 1928. In Linköping, Östgöta Logistic Corps' barracks area on Kaserngatan in Linköping was taken over. Remaining in Örebro was a decommissioning organization until 31 March 1928. Through the Defence Act of 1982, it was decided, among other things, that the Swedish Armed Forces would leave the barracks on Kaserngatan. This was done by relocating the logistic school to Skövde, and that the Svea Logistic Regiment would be disbanded and be amalgamated into the Svea Logistic Battalion in the Life Grenadier Regiment. From 1 July 1985, the Logistic Battalion was located in the southwestern part of the double barracks area at Regementsgatan in Linköping. The barracks area on Kaserngatan was abandoned and transferred to Linköping Municipality's ownership on 1 January 1986.

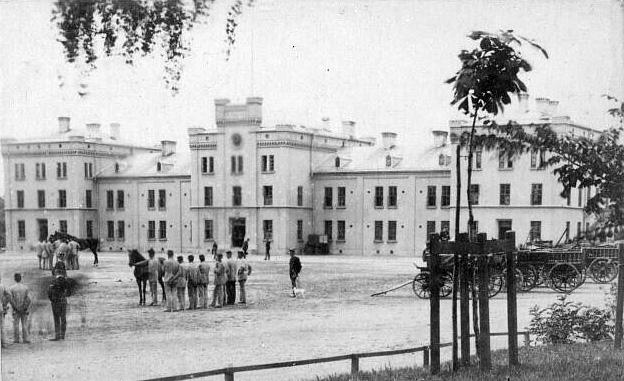
The corps in Marieberg, Stockholm

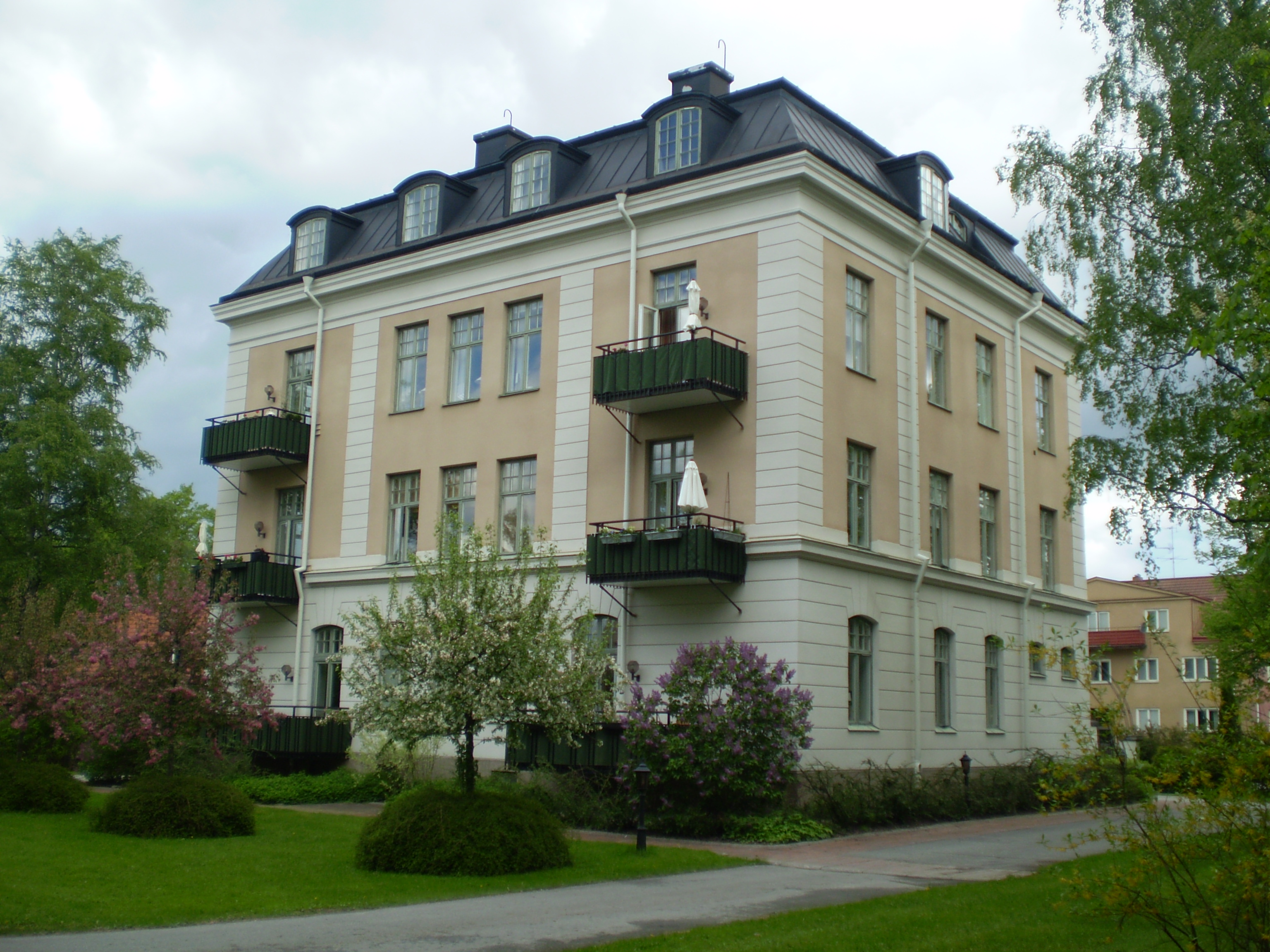
Chancellery building, Örebro

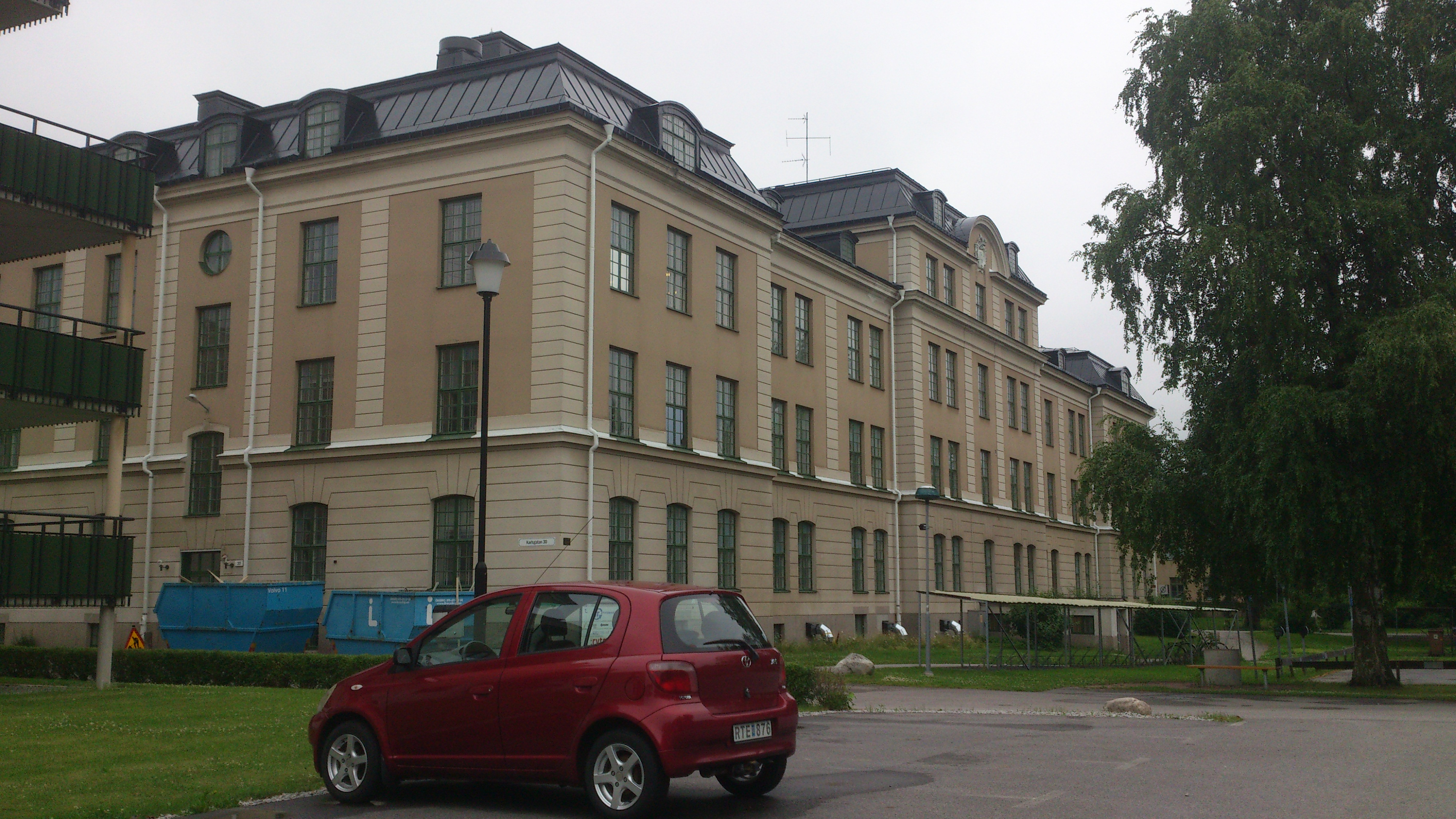
Main barracks, Örebro

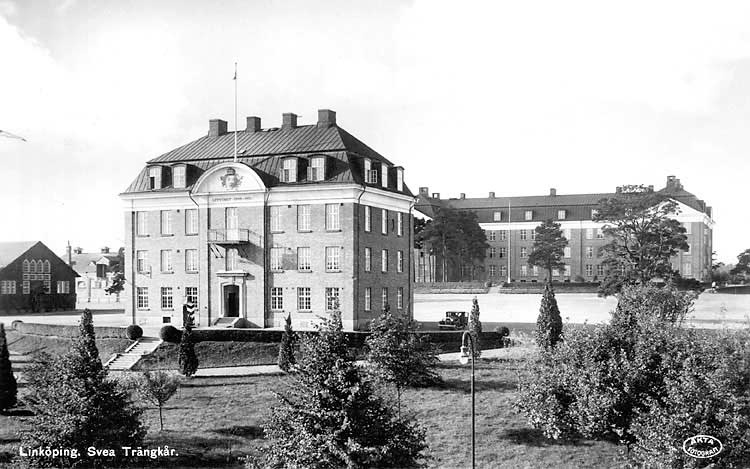
Chancellery building and barracks, Linköping

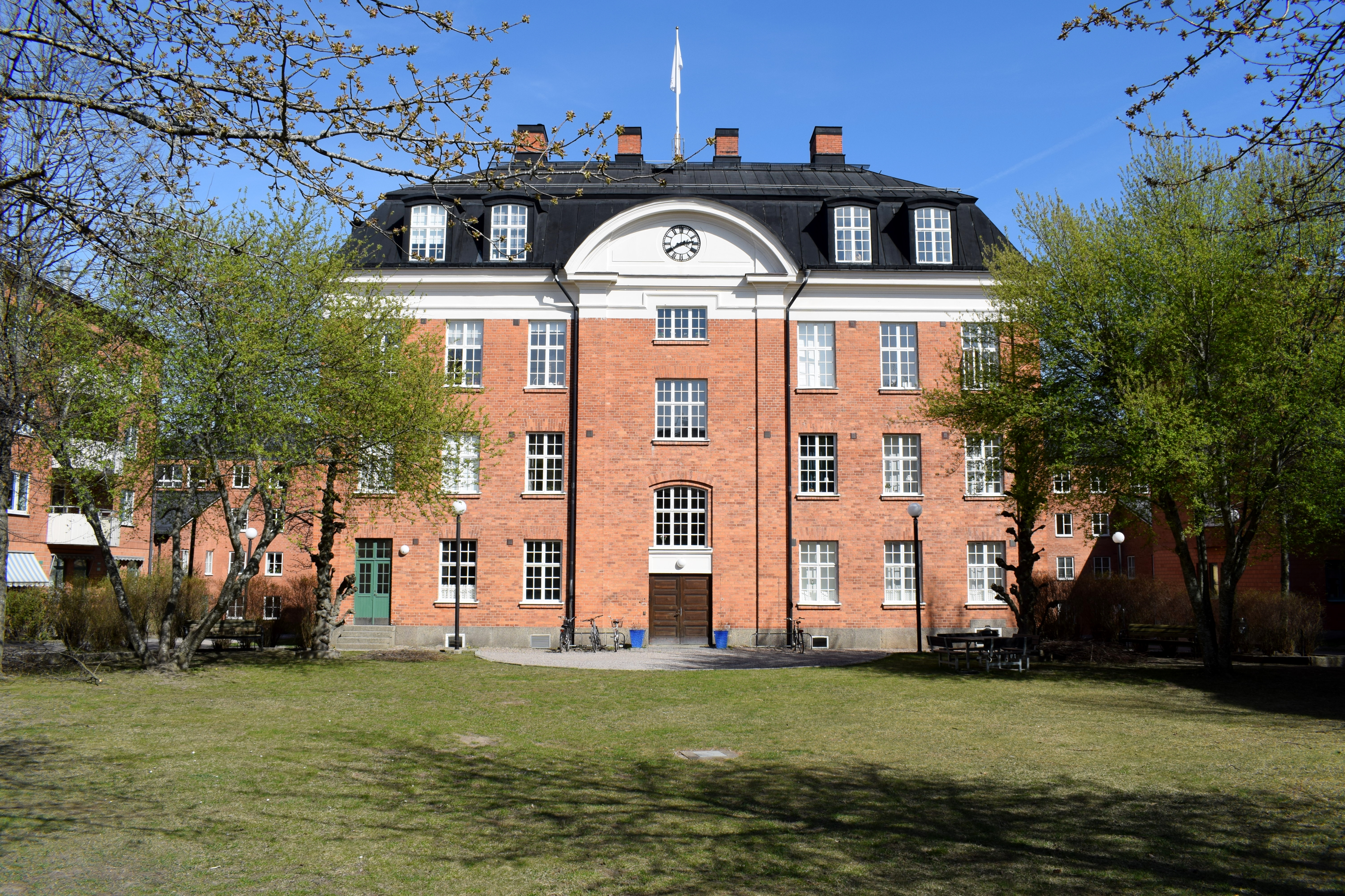
Chancellery building, Linköping

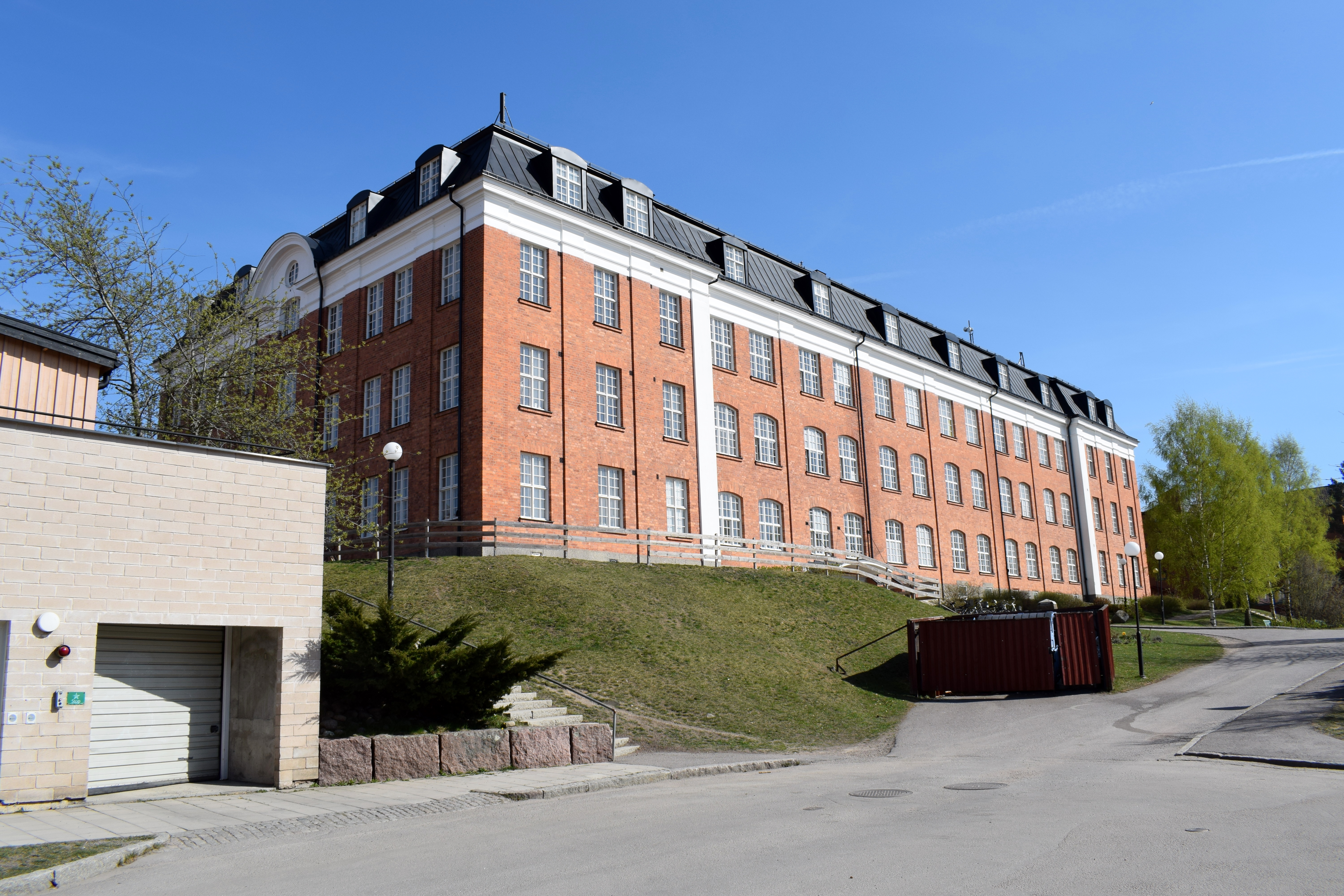
Main barracks, Linköping

== Heraldry and traditions ==
=== Coat of arms ===
The coat of the arms of the unit was used from 1977 to 1997. Blazon: "Gules, the provincial badge of Östergötland, a griffin with dragon wing and tail segreant or, armed and langued azure. The shield surmounted a cart wheel of four spokes over two swords in saltire, argent".

=== Colours, standards and guidons ===
The colour was presented to the former Royal Svea Logistic Corps (T 1) in Linköping by the commanding officer of the Eastern Army Division (Östra arméfördelningen), Lieutenant General Gösta Lilliehöök on 1 September 1935 at the 50-years anniversary of the Swedish Army Service Troops. It was used as regimental colour by the unit until 1 June 1997. The colour is drawn by Mrs Westberg and embroidered by hand in insertion technique by the company Licium. Blazon: "On light blue cloth in the middle, on a circular shield the lesser coat of arms of Sweden according to the law, the shield surrounded by white tongues and rays. In the first corner the griffin segreant of the provincial badge of Östergötland; yellow, armed and langued red."

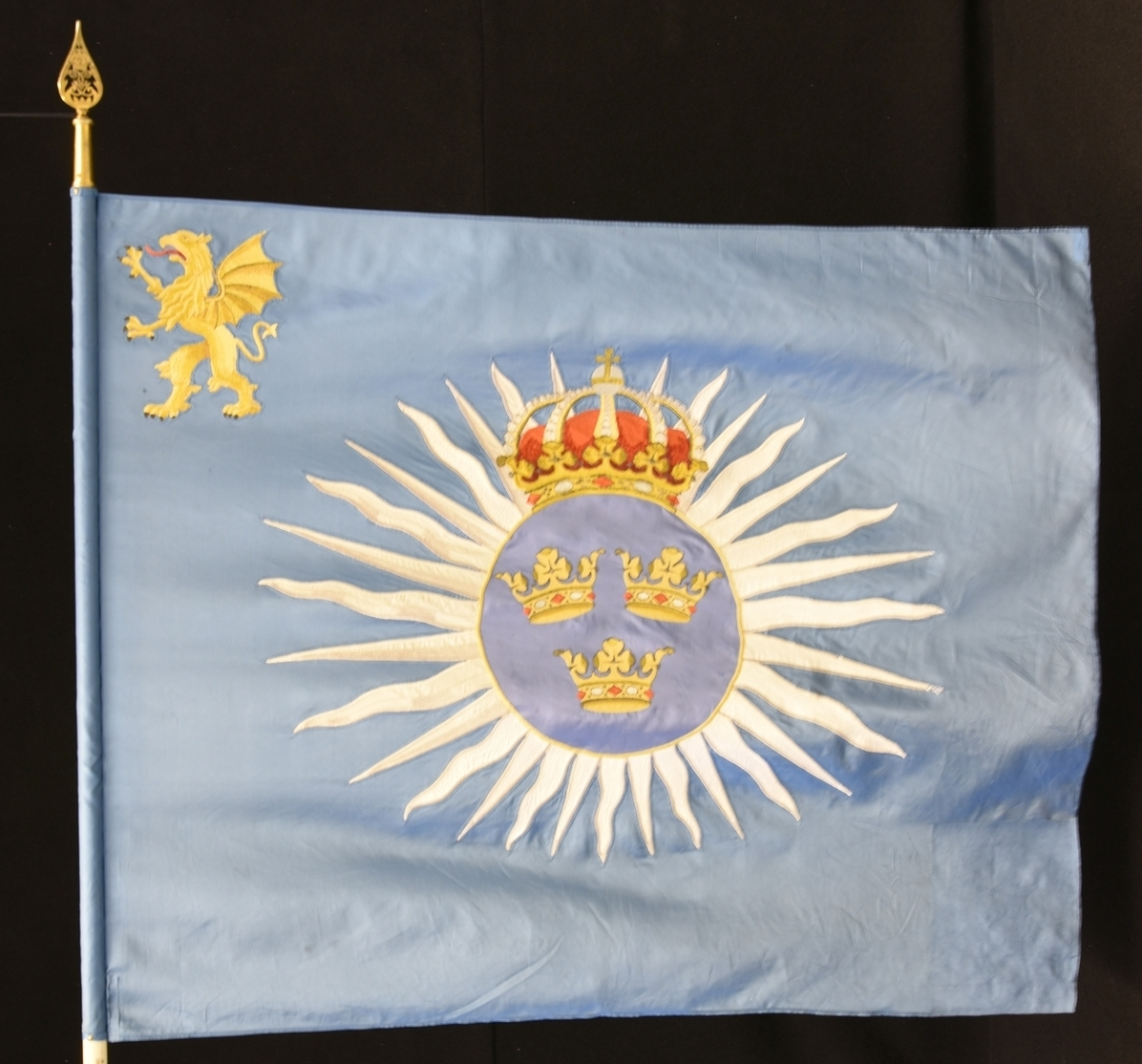
Colour

=== Medals ===
In 1997, the Svea trängkårs (T 1) minnesmedalj i silver ("Svea Logistic Corps (T 1) Commemorative Medal") in silver (SveatrkårSMM) of the 8th size was established. The medal ribbon is of blue moiré with white edges and a white stripe on the middle.

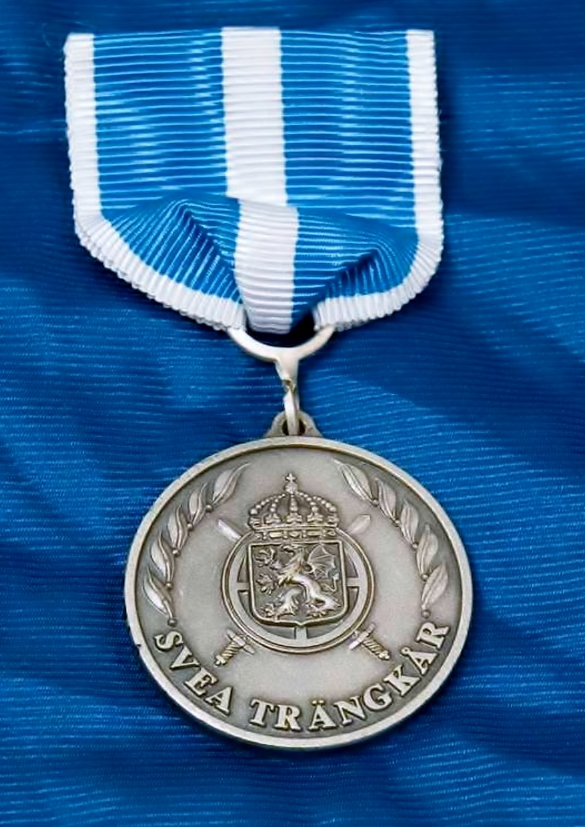
Commemorative medal

== Commanding officers ==
- 1885–1903: Jakob Oskar Gottfrid Smedmark
- 1903–1916: Nils Gustaf Hallström
- 1917–1918: Berndt Reinhold Martin Festin
- 1919–1922: Oscar Sigfrid Lindström
- 1922–1925: Sven Einar Torsten Carlsson
- 1925–1926: Carl Anders Möller
- 1926–1927: Eric Virgin
- 1927–1927: Gustaf Axel Smith
- 1928–1929: Sven Axel Engdahl
- 1929–1934: Gösta Frössén
- 1934–1944: Gustaf Axel Smith
- 1944–1955: Axel Joseph Einar Qvarnström
- 1955–1958: Bjarne Hemming Natt och Dag
- 1958–1963: Yngve Diurlin
- 1963–1970: Sigurd S:son Melin
- 1970–1974: Sven Torfgård
- 1974–1978: Lennart Önfelt
- 1978–1979: Nils Yngve Ekman
- 1979–1983: Claes Erik Sebastian P:son Tamm
- 1983–1985: Ragnar Söderberg
- 1985–1987: Kjell Svensson
- 1987–1990: Torolf Nilzén
- 1990–1993: Björn Frykhed
- 1993–1997: Tore Månsson

== Names, designations and locations ==
Note: The word träng ("train") as in trängregemente is translated to either "train", "service force"; "transport"; "baggage"; "supply vehicles" pl.; (Br) "army service corps", (US) "maintenance and supply troops", "transportation" (adj.), or "logistic".

Name	Translation	From		To
Kungl. Svea trängbataljon	Royal Svea Logistic Battalion	1891-01-31	–	1901-12-31
Kungl. Första Svea trängkår	Royal 1st Svea Logistic Corps	1902-01-01	–	1904-12-07
Kungl. Svea trängkår	Royal Svea Logistic Corps	1904-12-08	–	1949-06-30
Kungl. Svea trängregemente	Royal Svea Logistic Regiment	1949-07-01	–	1974-12-31
Svea trängregemente	Svea Logistic Regiment	1975-01-01	–	1985-06-30
Svea trängbataljon	Svea Logistic Battalion	1985-07-01	–	1994-06-30
Svea trängkår	Svea Logistic Corps	1994-07-01	–	1997-12-31
Designation		From		To
T 1		1891-01-31	–	1997-12-31
Location		From		To
Stockholm Garrison/Marieberg		1891-01-31	–	1907-10-03
Örebro Garrison		1907-10-04	–	1928-03-31
Linköping Garrison		1928-01-01	–	1997-12-31

== See also ==
- List of Swedish logistic regiments
