= Per Kellin =

Swedish military personnel

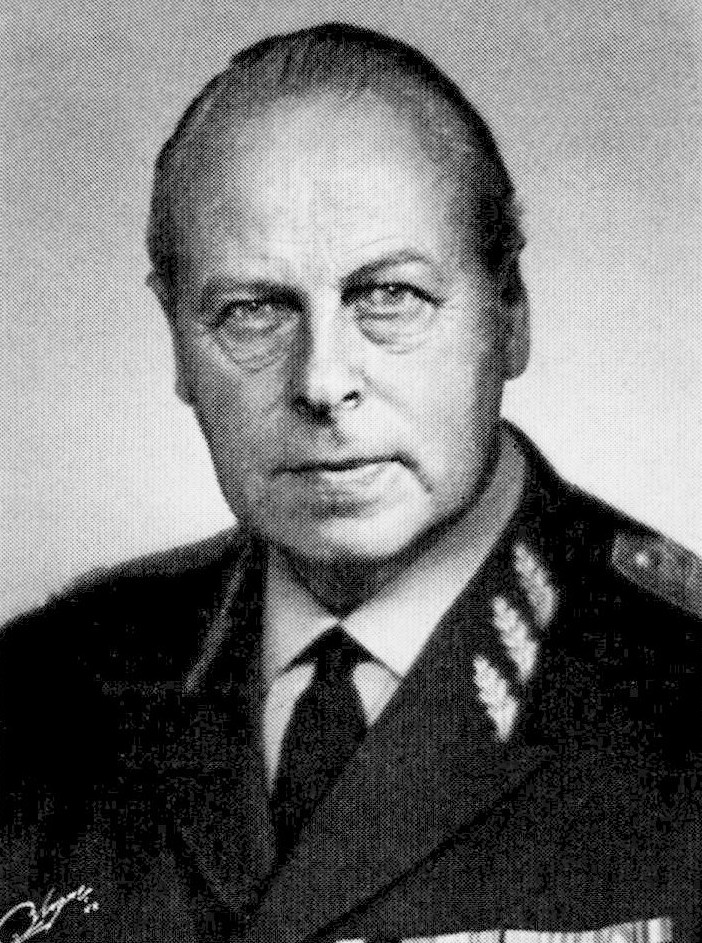
- Born: Per Åke Nilsson Kellin; 17 September 1903; Stockholm, Sweden
- Died: 31 March 1973 (aged 69); Stockholm, Sweden
- Military career
- Allegiance: Sweden
- Branch: Swedish Army
- Service years: 1924–1968
- Rank: Major General
- Commands: Scanian Logistic Regiment; Chief of Home Guard

Major General Per Åke Nilsson Kellin (17 September 1903 – 31 March 1973) was a Swedish Army officer. He served as Chief of Home Guard from 1955 to 1968

== Early life ==
Kellin was born on 17 September 1903 in Svea Life Guards Parish (Svea Livgardes församling) in Stockholm, Sweden, as the son of captain Nils Adolf Kellin and his wife Thyra Charlotta Hermansson. He passed studentexamen at Nya Elementar in Stockholm in the spring of 1922.

== Career ==
Kellin was commissioned as an officer in 1924 with the rank of second lieutenant and was assigned to Södermanland Regiment (I 10) the same year. He was promoted to lieutenant in 1928 and later as captain in the General Staff Corps. In 1939, Kellin participated in a course in the French Army. He served as a teacher at the Royal Swedish Naval Staff College from 1940 to 1942 when he was promoted to major. During this time, Kellin was also military contributor in Radiotjänst (1941–1945), Arbetet (1941–1944) and in Svenska Dagbladet (1941–1947).

Kellin served as Vice Chief of the Military Office of the Land Defence (Lantförsvarets kommandoexpedition) in 1944 and as Chief of the Army Section in the Military Office of the Minister of Defence from 1945 to 1947. He was promoted to lieutenant colonel in the General Staff Corps in 1946 and he served in the Älvsborg Regiment (I 15) in 1947. Kellin was promoted to colonel in the General Staff Corps in 1950 and he was appointed Section Chief in the Army Staff. In 1952, Kellin was promoted to colonel in the Swedish Army Service Troops and in 1952 he was appointed commanding officer of the Scanian Logistic Regiment in Hässleholm.

On 1 October 1955, Kellin assumed the position of Chief of Home Guard and became a member of the Executive Committee of the Central Board of the National [Swedish] Rifle Clubs (Skytteförbundens överstyrelse). He was promoted to major general in 1959. He held the Chief of Home Guard position until 30 September 1968 when he retired from active service.

== Personal life ==
Kellin married on 7 October 1930 in Frustuna, Södermanland County to Selma Birgitta (Britta) Jernbergh (born 8 August 1906 in Eskilstuna), the daughter of kronokassören JK Carl Laurentius (Lars) Jernbergh and Selma Christina Lovisa Henschen.

== Dates of rank ==
- 31 December 1924 – Second lieutenant
- 30 December 1926 – Underlöjtnant
- 1 January 1928 – Lieutenant
- 1 October 1937 – Captain
- 1 October 1942 – Major
- 1 October 1946 – Lieutenant colonel
- 1 October 1950 – Colonel
- 1 October 1959 – Major general

== Awards and decorations ==
=== Swedish ===
- (Sweden) Commander 1st Class of the Order of the Sword (23 November 1956)
- (Sweden) Knight of the Order of the Polar Star
- (Sweden) Knight of the Order of Vasa
- (Sweden) Home Guard Silver Medal
- (Sweden) Swedish Central Federation for Voluntary Military Training Medal of Merit in silver
- (Sweden) Swedish Women's Voluntary Defence Organization Royal Medal of Merit in silver
- (Sweden) Swedish Red Cross Medal of Merit in gold (Svenska Röda Korsets förtjänstmedalj i guld, SRKGM) (1953)
- (Sweden) Society for the Promotion of School Youth's Weapons Exercises Medal of Merit in gold and silver (Föreningen för befrämjande av skolungdomens vapenövningars förtjänstmedalj, SkolVGM/SM) (1968)
- (Sweden) North Scanian Association for Volunteer Military Training's Silver Medal (Norra skånska befäls(utbildnings)förbundets silvermedalj, NskånskabfbSM) (1954)
- (Sweden) National Swedish Rifle Association's silver medal (Sveriges skytteförbunds överstyrelses silvermedalj, SvsfbSM)
- (Sweden) Swedish Army and Air Force Reserve Officers Association's Badge of Honor (Svenska arméns och flygvapnets reservofficersförbunds hederstecken, SvRoffHt)

=== Foreign ===
- (Norway) Commander with Star of the Order of St. Olav (1 July 1968)
- Commander of the Order of the Lion of Finland
- Officer of the Order of the Crown of Italy
- (France) Knight of the Legion of Honour
- (Denmark) King Christian X's Liberty Medal
- (Denmark) Danish Reserve Officers Association's Badge of Honor (Danska reservofficersförbundets hederstecken)
- (Denmark) Danish Home Guard Badge of Merit

== Honours ==
- Member of the Royal Swedish Academy of War Sciences (1946)

Military offices
Preceded by Gunnar Brinck	Chief of Home Guard; 1955–1968	Succeeded by Karl Gustaf Brandberg
