= Eric Virgin (officer) =

Swedish Air Force officer

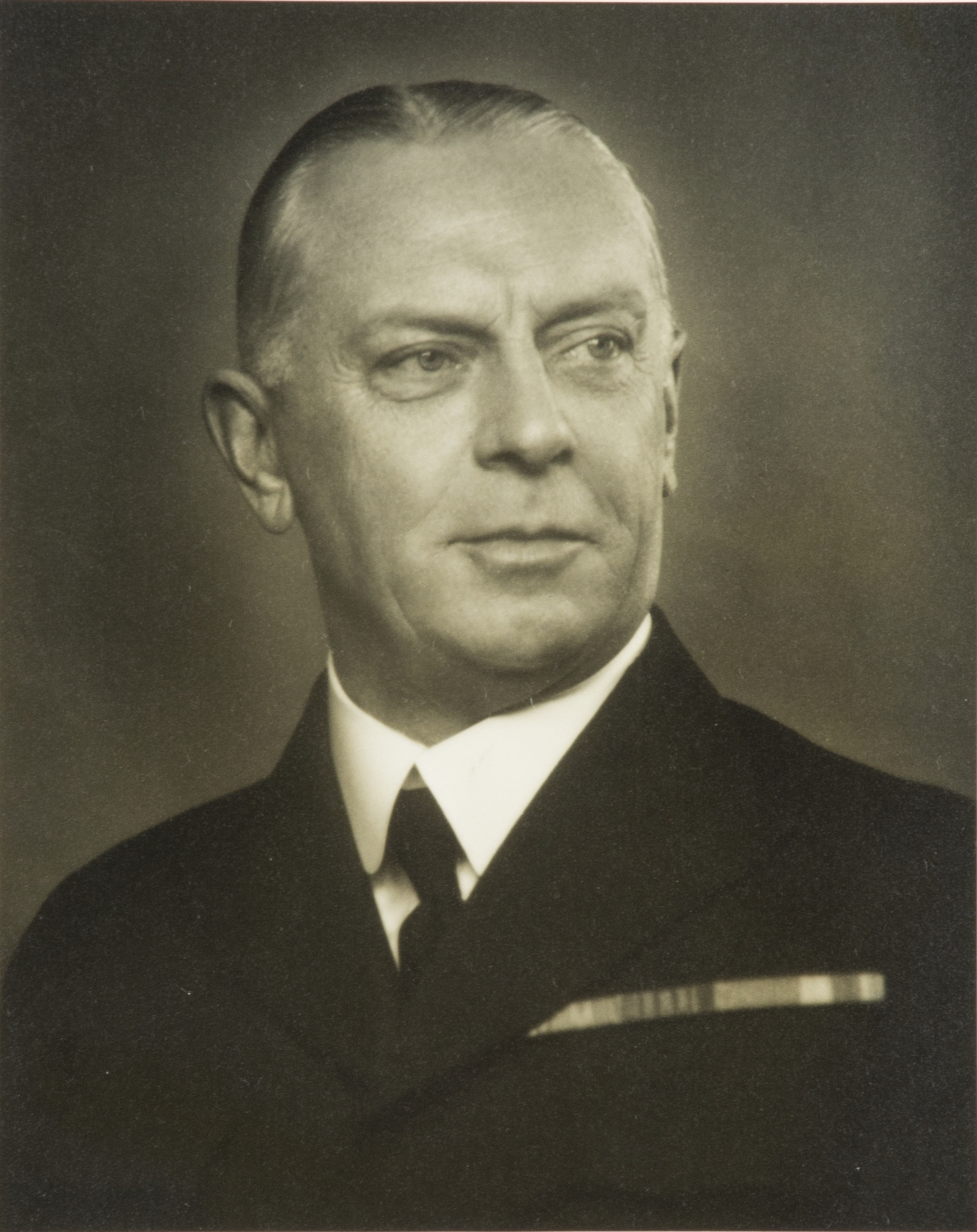
- Born: 18 May 1876; Skövde, Sweden
- Died: 12 May 1950 (aged 73); Stockholm, Sweden
- Burial place: Norra begravningsplatsen
- Relatives: Oskar Ewerlöf (brother-in-law)
- Military career
- Allegiance: Sweden
- Branch: Swedish Army; Swedish Air Force
- Service years: 1895–1934 (Sweden); 1934–1935 (Abyssinia); 1936–1947 (Sweden)
- Rank: Major General
- Commands: Svea Logistic Corps; Swedish Army Service Troops; Chief of the Air Force
- Other work: Advisor to Haile Selassie

Major General Eric Virgin (18 May 1876 – 12 May 1950) was a Swedish Air Force officer. Originally a Swedish Army officer, Virgin became commanding officer of the Svea Logistic Corps (T 1) in 1926 and was appointed Inspector of the Swedish Army Service Troops the year after. In 1931 he was appointed Chief of the Air Force for the newly established Swedish Air Force. Virgin left the position as major general in 1934 to become advisor to the Emperor of Abyssinia. He left Abyssinia two days before the outbreak of the Second Italo-Ethiopian War in 1935; back in Sweden, he was placed in the Swedish Air Force reserve, where he remained until 1947. Virgin died three years later.

== Early life ==
Virgin was born on 18 May 1876 in Skövde, Sweden, the son of colonel Ivar Virgin and his wife Hedvig (née af Klint).

== Career ==
He was commissioned as an officer in Småland Grenadier Corps (I 7) in 1898 with the rank of underlöjtnant and attended the Royal Central Gymnastics Institute from 1899 to 1901 and the Royal Swedish Army Staff College from 1902 to 1904. Virgin served at the Life Regiment of Horse (K 1) in 1903 and was promoted to lieutenant in 1904 and served as a company officer at the Royal Military Academy in 1905. Virgin then served at Wendes Artillery Regiment (A 3) in 1907 and at the Swedish State Railways from 1908 to 1910. He was a teacher at the Royal Swedish Army Staff College from 1910 to 1916 and became captain of the General Staff in 1912. The year after, Virgin served at Positionsartilleriregementet (A 3) and he became captain in the Life Regiment Grenadiers (I 3) in 1916.

He accompanied the 1st, 5th and 10th Austro-Hungarian Army in 1917 and was a member of the Study Commission to the German Western Front in 1918. Back in Sweden, Virgin was appointed chief adjutant (överadjutant) and major of the General Staff in 1918 and was appointed head of the Communications Department there in 1919. Virgin was appointed chief adjutant and was promoted to lieutenant colonel in 1922. He became commanding officer of Svea Logistic Corps (T 1) in 1926 and was appointed Inspector of the Swedish Army Service Troops (Tränginspektör) in 1927. Virgin was promoted to major general and was appointed Chief of the Air Force and head of Flygstyrelsen in 1931. He left the post in 1934 to become political and military advisor to the Emperor of Abyssinia the same year.

Virgin and captain Viking Tamm as well as four other military officers (the lieutenants Nils Bouveng, Arne Thorburn, Gustaf Heüman and Anders Nyblom) entered together into the Abyssinian service to organize the country's only military school for the training of Abyssinian officers. A Swedish military academy for cadets was established in Holeta Genet under captain Tamm who, with his staff, stayed on in Abyssinia after the outbreak of the Second Italo-Ethiopian War despite pressure by the Swedish government to return. Virgin, who in Abyssinia was called "the White Emperor" and "Italy's enemy No. 1" because of his great influence, did nothing to dampen the Italian annoyance. On the contrary, he tried to tease Rome by recurrent condescending comments about Italians' military skills and their little prospect to emerge victorious from an armed conflict with the Abyssinians. He went so far as to even captain Tamm and the Swedish consul in Addis Ababa turned to the Foreign Ministry in Stockholm and asked for a transfer of the talkative general. The result was that Virgin left Abyssinia on 1 October 1935, only two days before the Italian invasion. Back in Sweden he was placed in the Swedish Air Force reserve in 1936 where he stayed until 1947.

=== Other work ===
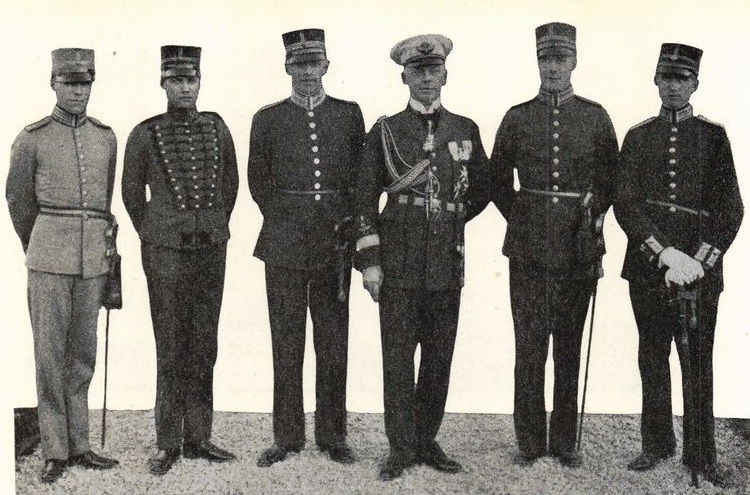
Major General Virgin (third from right) in Addis Ababa in 1934.

Virgin was chairman of the Military Association K.H.S. from 1918 to 1923 and secretary of Military Literature Association (Militärlitteraturföreningen) from 1914 to 1918. He was also an expert for the reorganization of the Road and Waterway Construction Service Corps in 1924, for the drafting of war regulations for the Swedish Air Force in 1928 and chairman of the experts drafting the new field service regulations for the Swedish Army in 1929.

He became a member of the Royal Swedish Academy of War Sciences in 1924 and was second president from 1937 to 1940. Virgin was a member of the National Board of the Swedish Red Cross in 1927 and of the central board of the voluntary defense organization Röda stjärnan from 1928 to 1931. He was a board member of the Royal Automobile Club in 1928 and was its chairman from 1933 to 1934 and its first vice chairman from 1940 to 1943. Virgin was chairman of the Directorate of the Swedish Nobility Foundation from 1944.

== Personal life ==
In 1902, Virgin married Olga Ewerlöf (1880–1976), the daughter of Colonel Fritz Ewerlöf and Anna (née Groothoff). He was the father of Fritz-Ivar Christian (1903–1984) and Olga Marianne (born 1908).

== Death ==
Eric Virgin died on 12 May 1950 in Stockholm. He was buried at Norra begravningsplatsen in Stockholm.

== Dates of rank ==
- 1898 – Underlöjtnant
- 1904 – Lieutenant
- 1912 – Captain
- 1918 – Major
- 1922 – Lieutenant colonel
- 1926 – Colonel
- 1931 – Major general

== Awards and decorations ==
=== Swedish ===
- (Sweden) King Gustaf V's Jubilee Commemorative Medal (1928)
- (Sweden) Commander 1st Class of the Order of the Sword (6 June 1932)
- (Sweden) Knight of the Order of Vasa
- (Sweden) Landstormen Silver Medal (Landstormens silvermedalj)
- (Sweden) Swedish Red Cross Gold Medal (Svenska Röda korsets guldmedalj)

=== Foreign ===
- (Ethiopian Empire) Knight Grand Cross of the Order of Menelik II
- (Ethiopian Empire) Grand Cross of the Order of the Star of Ethiopia
- (Norway) Commander with Star of the Order of St. Olav
- (Denmark) Commander 1st Class of the Order of the Dannebrog
- Commander 2nd Class of the Order of the White Rose of Finland
- (Poland) Commander of the Order of Polonia Restituta
- (Tunisia) Commander of the Order of Glory
- (Austria) Austrian Red Cross Badge of Honor for Officers with war decoration

== Bibliography ==
- Virgin, Eric (1936). Abessinska minnen [Abyssinian memories] (in Swedish). Stockholm: Bonnier. SELIBR 1381725.
- Virgin, Eric (1936). The Abyssinia I knew. London. SELIBR 8236663.
- Virgin, Eric (1936). Ussamkura rundar Afrika: fem korta historier [Ussamkura rounds Africa: five short stories] (in Swedish). Stockholm: Bonnier. SELIBR 1381726.

Military offices
Preceded by John Améen	Inspector of the Swedish Army Service Troops; 1927–1931	Succeeded by Olof Thörnell
Preceded by Karl Amundson	Chief of the Air Force; 1931–1934	Succeeded by Torsten Friis
Professional and academic associations
Preceded by Fredrik Riben	Chairman of the Directorate of the Swedish Nobility Foundation; 1944–1947	Succeeded by Helge Silverstolpe
