= List of Swedish logistic regiments =

This is a list of Swedish logistic regiments, battalions, corps, and companies that have been part of the Swedish Army. The regiments are categorized in three ways: first by the actual units that existed, second by the different names these units have been known by, and third by their various designations.

== By unit ==
- Göta Logistic Regiment
- Norrland Logistic Regiment
- Scanian Logistic Regiment
- Svea Logistic Regiment
- Logistic Regiment
- Västmanland Logistic Corps
- Östgöta Logistic Corps

== By name ==
- 2nd Göta Logistic Corps
- 2nd Svea Logistic Corps
- 1st Göta Logistic Corps
- 1st Svea Logistic Corps
- Göta Logistic Battalion
- Göta Logistic Corps
- Göta Logistic Regiment
- Norrland Logistic Battalion
- Norrlands Logistic Corps
- Norrland Logistic Regiment
- Scanian Logistic Corps
- Scanian Logistic Regiment
- Svea Logistic Battalion
- Svea Logistic Corps
- Svea Logistic Regiment
- Trängbataljonen
- Logistic Regiment
- Västmanland Logistic Corps
- Wendes Logistic Battalion
- Wendes Logistic Corps
- Östgöta Logistic Corps

== By designation ==
- T 1 - Svea Logistic Regiment
- T 2 - Göta Logistic Regiment
- T 3 - Norrland Logistic Regiment
- T 4 - Scanian Logistic Regiment
- T 5 - Västmanland Logistic Corps
- T 6 - Östgöta Logistic Corps
- TrängR - Logistic Regiment

== See also ==
- Swedish Army Service Troops
- List of Swedish regiments
