= Västmanland Logistic Corps =

Former corps of the Swedish Army

- Västmanlands trängkår
- Active: 1902–1927
- Country: Sweden
- Allegiance: Swedish Armed Forces
- Branch: Swedish Army
- Type: Service Troops
- Size: Corps
- Part of: V Army Division (1902–1927)
- Garrison/HQ: Sala
- Colors: Blue and white
- March: "Västmanlands trängkårs marsch" (Elfgren) (Note: The unit march was adopted in 1905.)

The Västmanland Logistic Corps (Swedish: Västmanlands trängkår, T 5) was a Swedish Army logistic corps operating between 1902 and 1927. The unit was based in Sala, Västmanland.

== History ==
Västmanland Logistic Corps was formed as the 2nd Svea Logistic Corps (No 5), according to the 1901 Riksdag decision. The corps was raised on 1 October 1902 in Stockholm as the 2nd Svea Logistic Corps. However, the first conscription training had already begun on 9 May 1902. The corps was initially co-located with the 1st Svea Logistic Corps in Marieberg, Stockholm. The corps, which belonged to the 5th Army Division, had two logistic companies and one medical company. When production in Sala Silver Mine was reduced and finally ceased in 1908, the city looked for new activities that could provide employment. This led to the 2nd Svea Logistic Corps being relocated to Västmanland and on 8 December 1904 received the new name Västmanlands Logistic Corps. When the new barracks were not completed, the corps was initially relocated to the grounds of Salbohed. On 28 March 1906, the corps moved into its newly built barracks establishment on Josefsdalssvägen in Sala.

Through the Defence Act of 1925, it was decided that the corps would be amalgamated into Göta Logistic Corps (T 2). The decision was later changed and the corps was disbanded on 31 December 1927. The remaining activities were transferred on 1 January 1928 to a decommissioning organization, which in turn was disbanded on 31 March 1928.

== Locations and training areas ==
The barracks, which the corps was placed in, were located in Sala, and were built according to the 1901 army building program according to the Royal Swedish Army Materiel Administration's type drawings for logistic units. The land on which the barracks area was built was previously under Väsby kungsgård, where Gustav Vasa lived during his visits to Sala Silver Mine. The corps commander had his home in Väsby. Väsby kungsgård was home to the non-commissioned officers within the corps. After the corps was disbanded on 31 December 1927, it remained empty until 1 October 1930, when a hospital was relocated to the area. The hospital, which was named Salberga Hospital, was a mental hospital and later a so-called "special hospital". At the back of the barracks, two transverse three-story wings were erected on each side of the barracks. In front of the barracks, where the corps had their parade-ground and a shooting range, a park and a sports ground were created. In 1974, the former non-commissioned officer mess was demolished. Although new buildings were erected over the years, the area came to be characterized by the barracks. However, it was demolished in 1983–1984, which was followed up in 1987 with the demolition of the chancellery building and the hospital barracks. The old stable was dismantled and moved to a farm outside the city. In 1997, the medical care at the hospital ceased. In 2005, a rebuilding of the area began, which was completed in 2007 to what became Salberga Prison. What has been left of the old corps since 2007 includes a dining room, exercise building, riding hall, ordnance workshop, medical stable. The lesser coat of arms that adorned the barracks' tympanum has also been preserved at Väsby kungsgård, however, it is smashed. The barracks that was built in Sala was, however, a copy of the one that was built on Västra Mark in Örebro, which still exists.

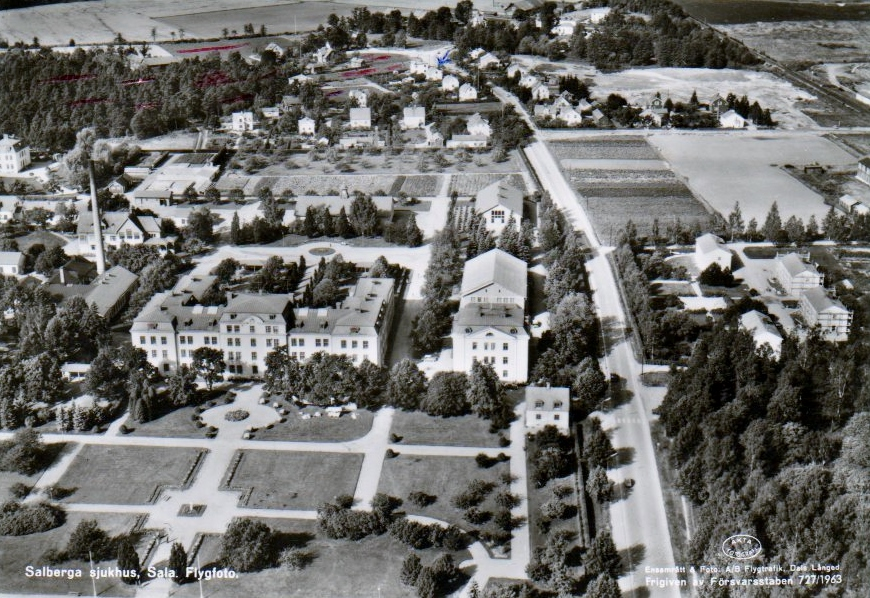
Barracks and later Salberga Hospital

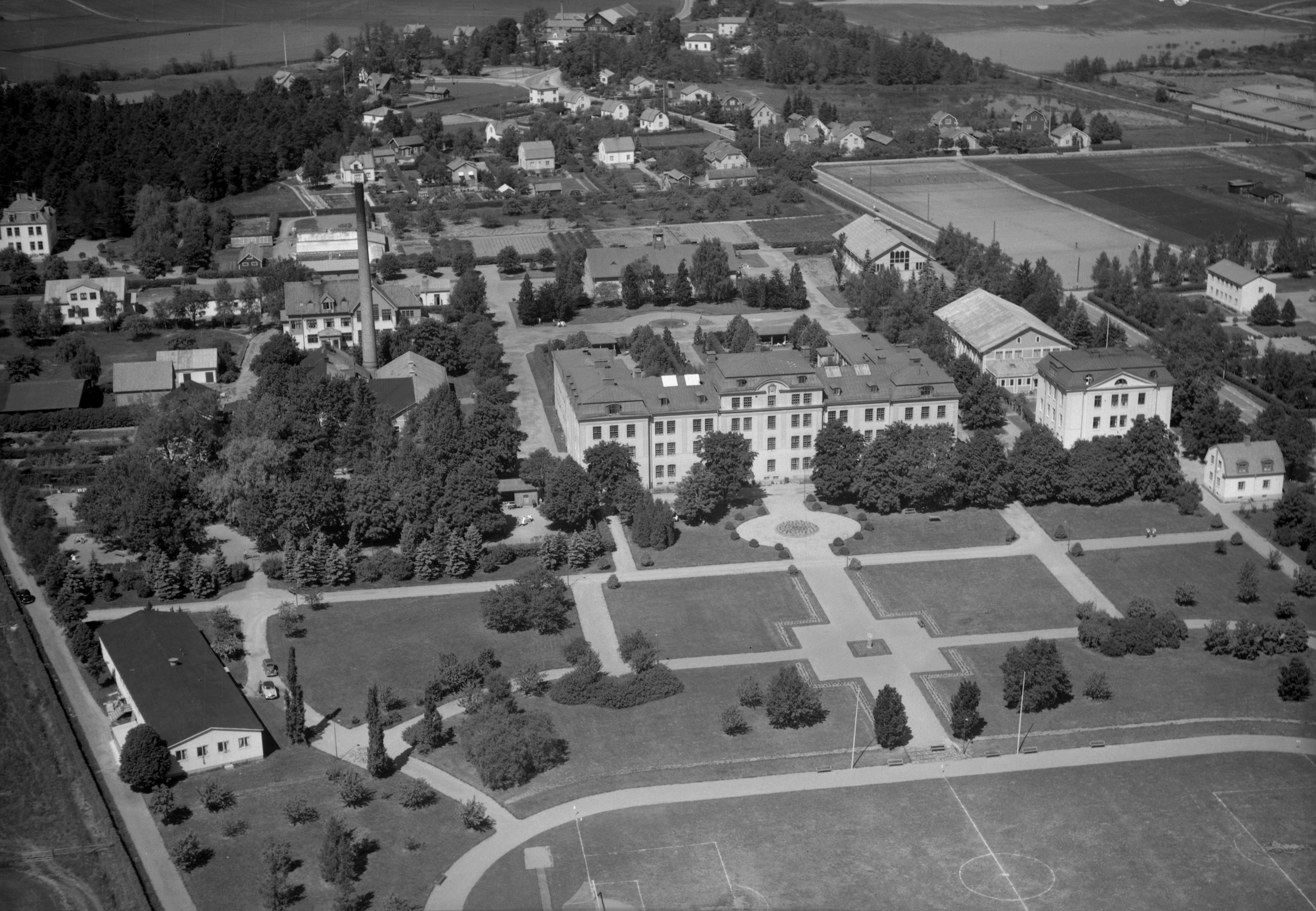
Barracks and later Salberga Hospital

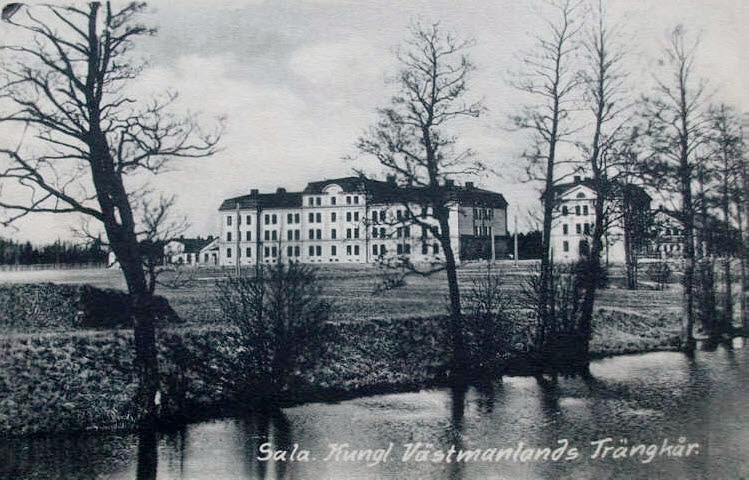
Barracks

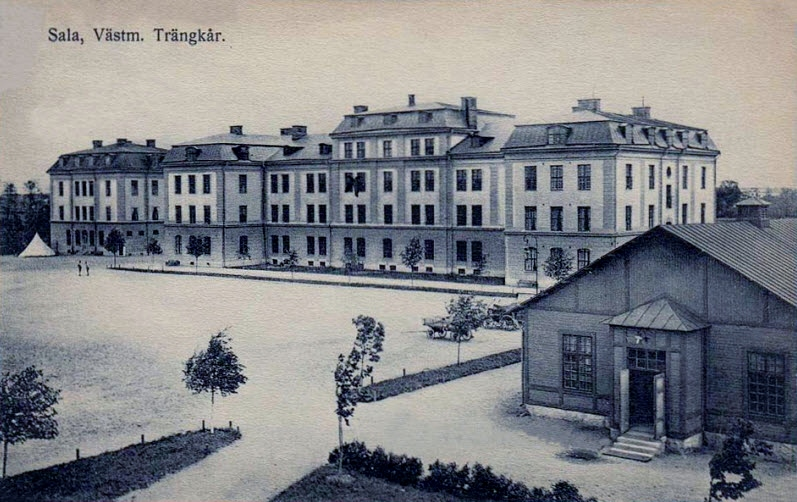
Barracks

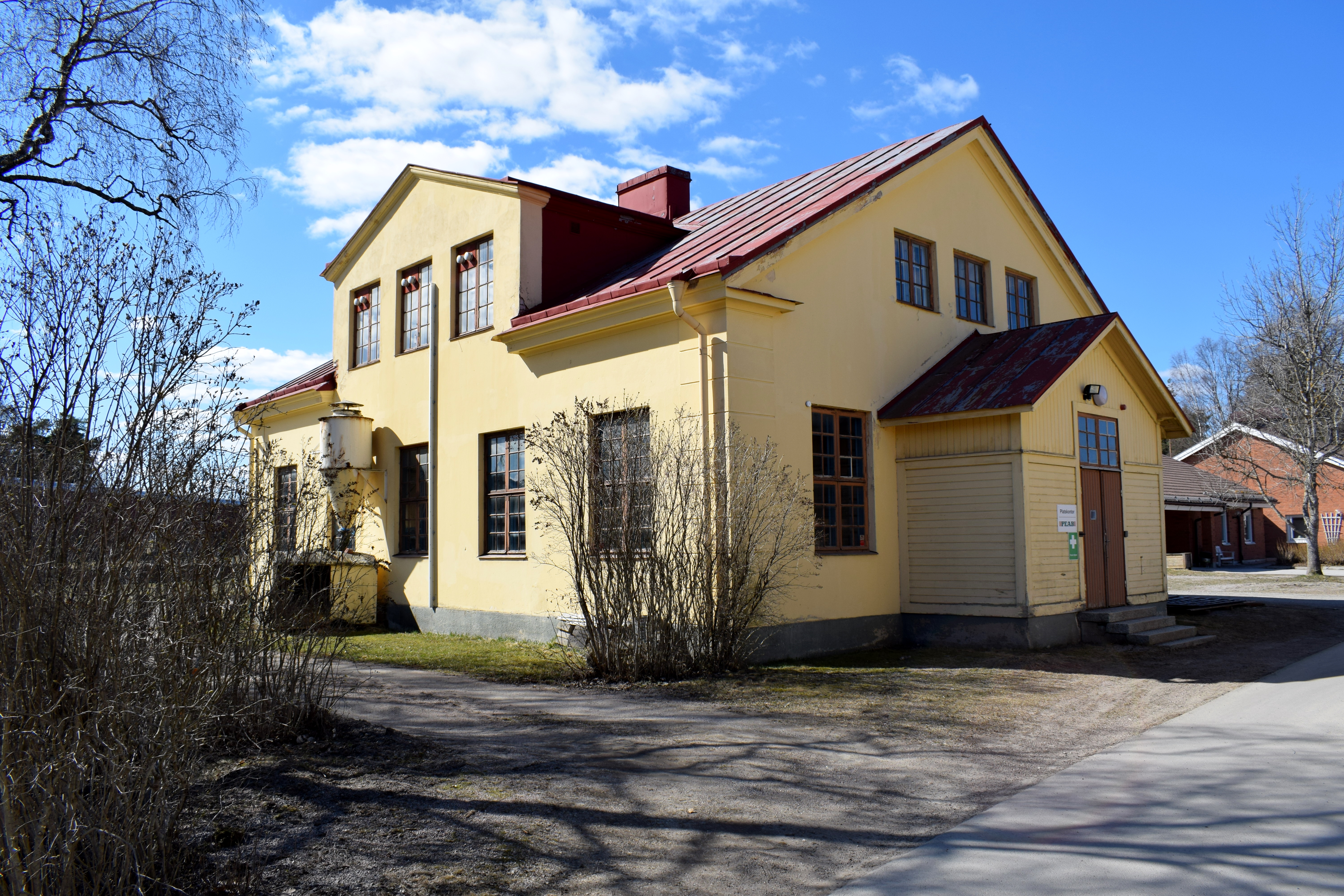
Ordnance workshop

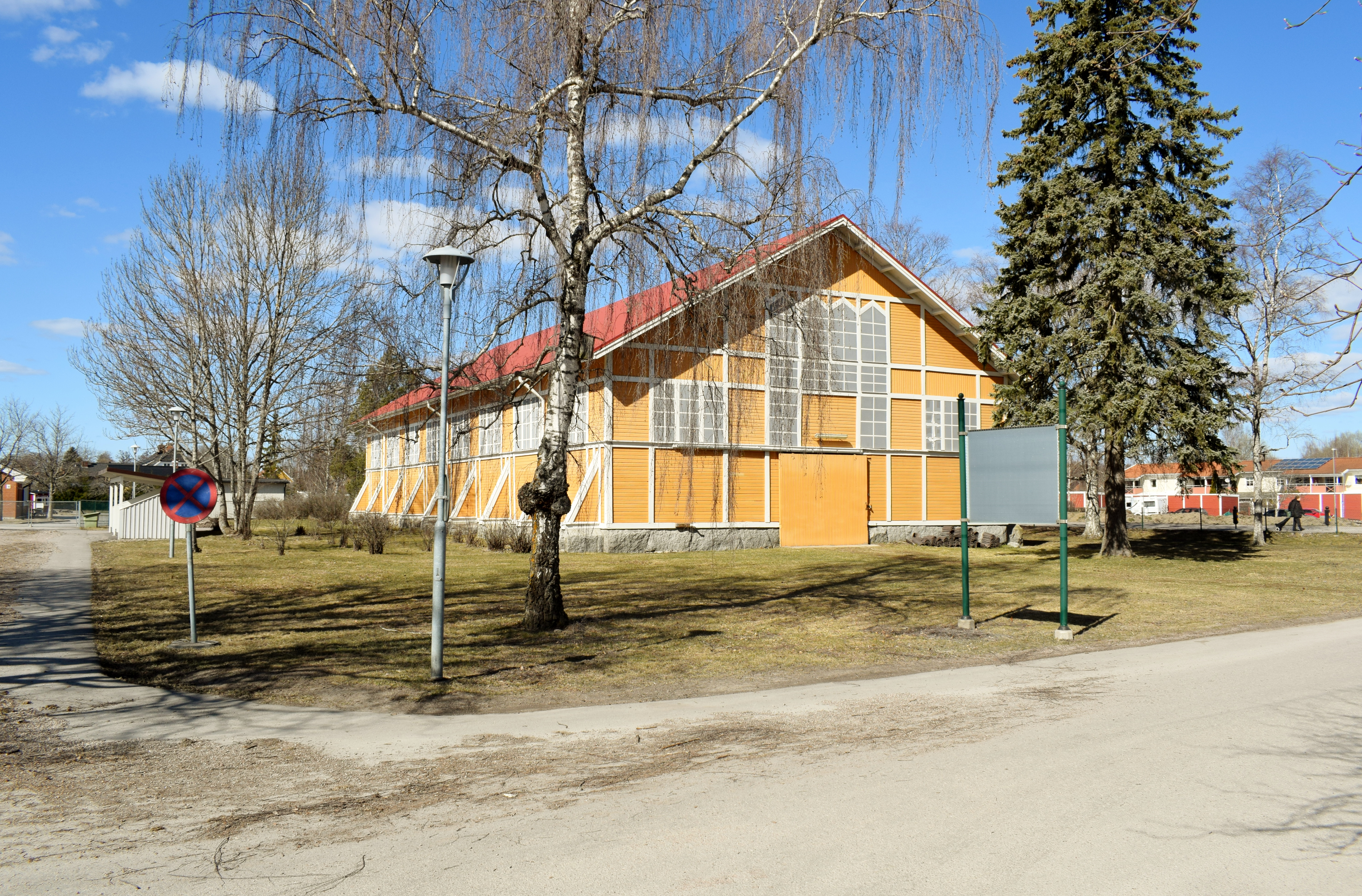
Riding hall

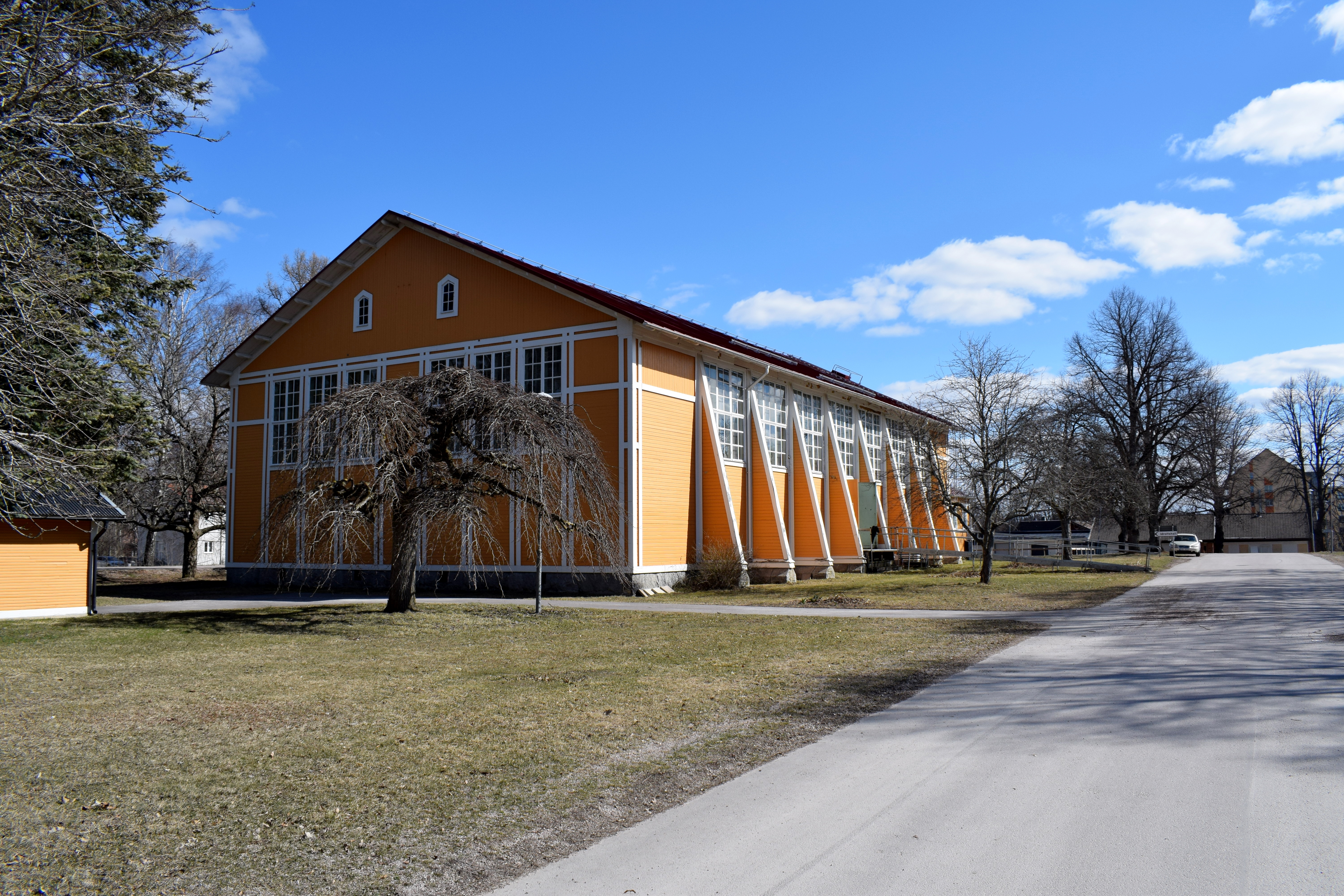
Sports venue

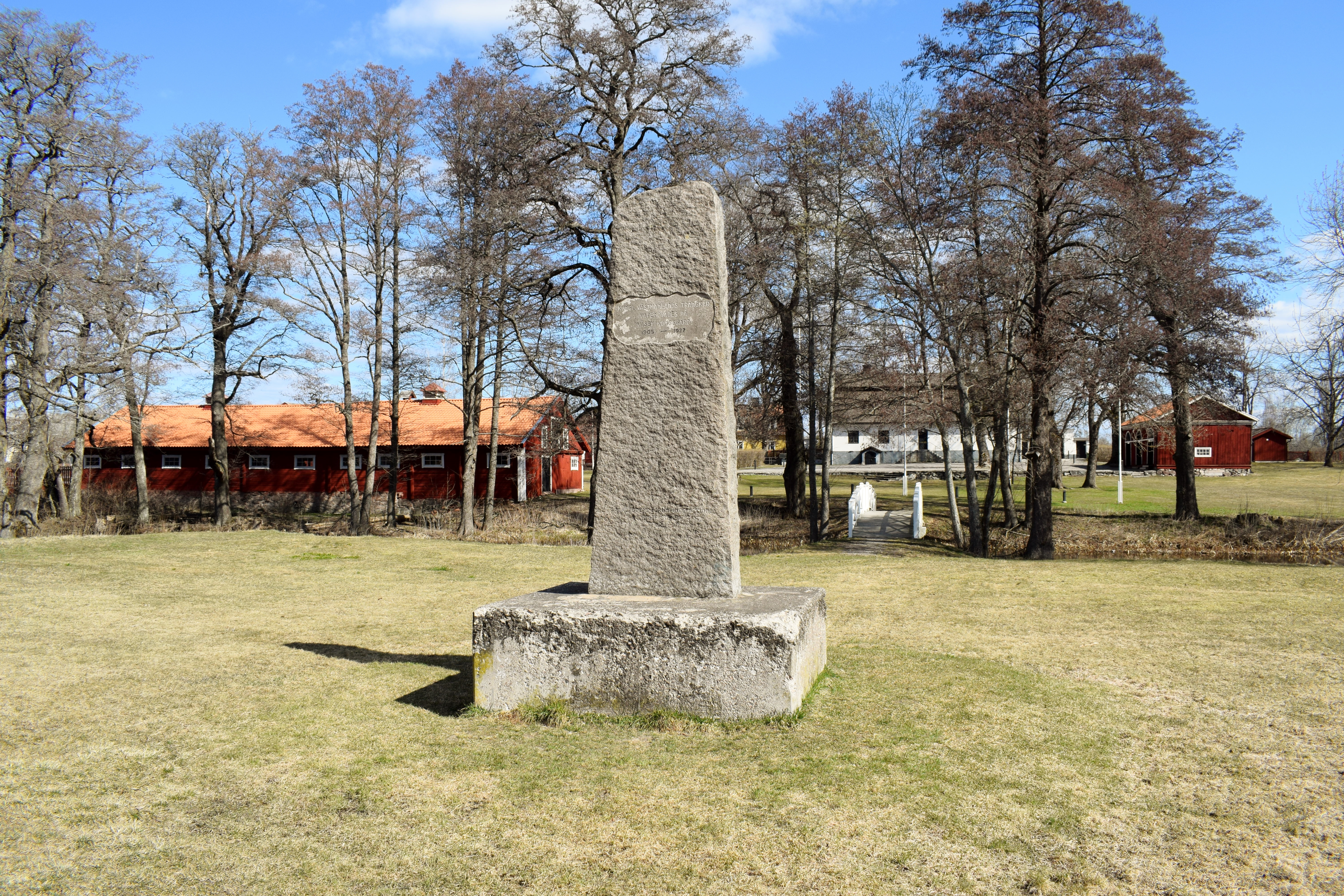
Memorial stone

== Commanding officers ==
- 1906–1916: Harald Svanström
- 1917–1918: Oscar Lindström
- 1919–1927: Hjalmar Tannlund

== Names, designations and locations ==
Note: The word träng ("train") as in trängregemente is translated to either "train", "service force"; "transport"; "baggage"; "supply vehicles" pl.; (Br) "army service corps", (US) "maintenance and supply troops", "transportation" (adj.), or "logistic".

Name	Translation	From		To
Kungl. Andra Svea trängkår	2nd Royal Svea Logistic Corps	1902-10-01	–	1904-12-03
Kungl Västmanlands trängkår	Royal Västmanlands Logistic Corps	1904-12-04	–	1927-12-31
Avvecklingsorganisation	Decommissioning Organization	1928-01-01	–	1928-03-31
Designation		From		To
No 5		1902-10-01	–	1914-09-30
T 5		1914-10-01	–	1927-12-31
Location		From		To
Stockholm Garrison		1902-10-01	–	1904-??-??
Salbohed		1904-??-??	–	1906-03-27
Sala		1906-03-28	–	1928-03-31

== See also ==
- List of Swedish logistic regiments
