= Scanian Logistic Battalion =

- Skånska trängbataljonen
- Active: 1894–1994
- Country: Sweden
- Allegiance: Swedish Armed Forces
- Branch: Swedish Army
- Type: Service Troops
- Size: Battalion
- Part of: 3rd Army Division (1894–1895); 1st Army Division (1895–1901); 1st Army Division (1902–1927); Southern Army Division (1928–1936); 1st Army Division (1937–1942); I Military District (1942–1966); Southern Military District (1966–1991); Scanian Dragoon Regiment (1991–1994)
- Garrison/HQ: Hässleholm
- March: "Skånska trängbataljonens marsch" (Bogren) (Note: The unit marsch was adopted before 1900 and was established in 1953 by Army Order 33/1953. The marsch was later used by the Swedish Army Maintenance Center (Arméns underhållscentrum, UhC) from 1994 to 1997.)

Insignia
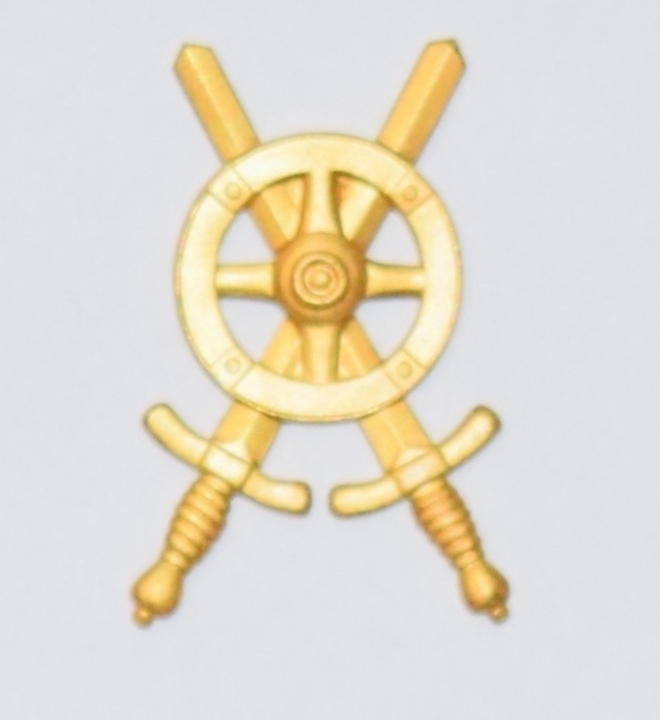
- Branch insignia

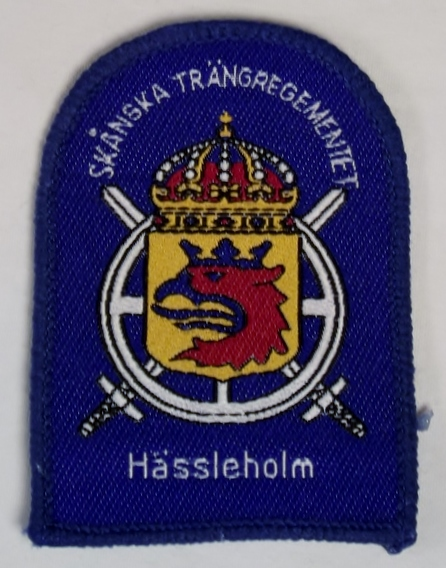
- Shoulder sleeve insignia

The Scanian Logistic Battalion (Swedish: Skånska trängbataljonen, T 4) was a Swedish Army logistic unit operating between 1894 and 1994. The unit was based in Hässleholm.

== History ==
The unit traces its origins to Wendes Logistic Battalion, which was raised in 1894 at Göta Logistic Battalion and which was initially located in Karlsborg. In May 1895, the battalion moved to Landskrona (Wendes Artillery Regiment's barracks). In 1901, the battalion's name was changed to Wendes Logistic Corps and in 1904 to Scanian Logistic Corps. In 1902, the 2nd Göta Logistic Corps was raised were the battalion was based. In October 1907, the corps moved to newly built barracks in Hässleholm. In the 1910s, the corps had two logistic and a medical company as well as a volunteer force of 68 men (with trumpeters). On 1 July 1949, the corps was changed to a regiment and in connection with this, part of the 1st Quartermaster Company (Förste intendenturkompaniet, Int 1) and the 1st Ordnance Company (Första tygkompaniet, Tyg 1) were amalgamated into the new regiment. Companies from the regiment have been stationed in Kristianstad and Revingehed. The regiment receives its conscripts mainly from Scania, Blekinge, Småland and Öland.

== Locations and training areas ==
=== Barracks ===
When the unit was formed in 1894, it was from 9 October 1894 grouped with the Göta Logistic Battalion in Karlsborg. On 9 May 1895, the unit was relocated to Landskrona, where the staff was located in Wendes Artillery Regiment's former barracks on Slottsgatan. On 3 October 1907, a relocation to a newly built barracks area at Finjagatan in Hässleholm began. On 17 October 1907, the entire unit had left Landskrona for Hässleholm. In 1943, three new barracks were built in Hässleholm and in 1958 two more barracks were built. On 1 July 1985, a move was started from Finjagatan to Garnisonsvägen, to be co-located with Scanian Dragoon Regiment. The relocation was initiated by the staff, and the relocation to Garnisonsvägen was fully completed on 1 July 1986.

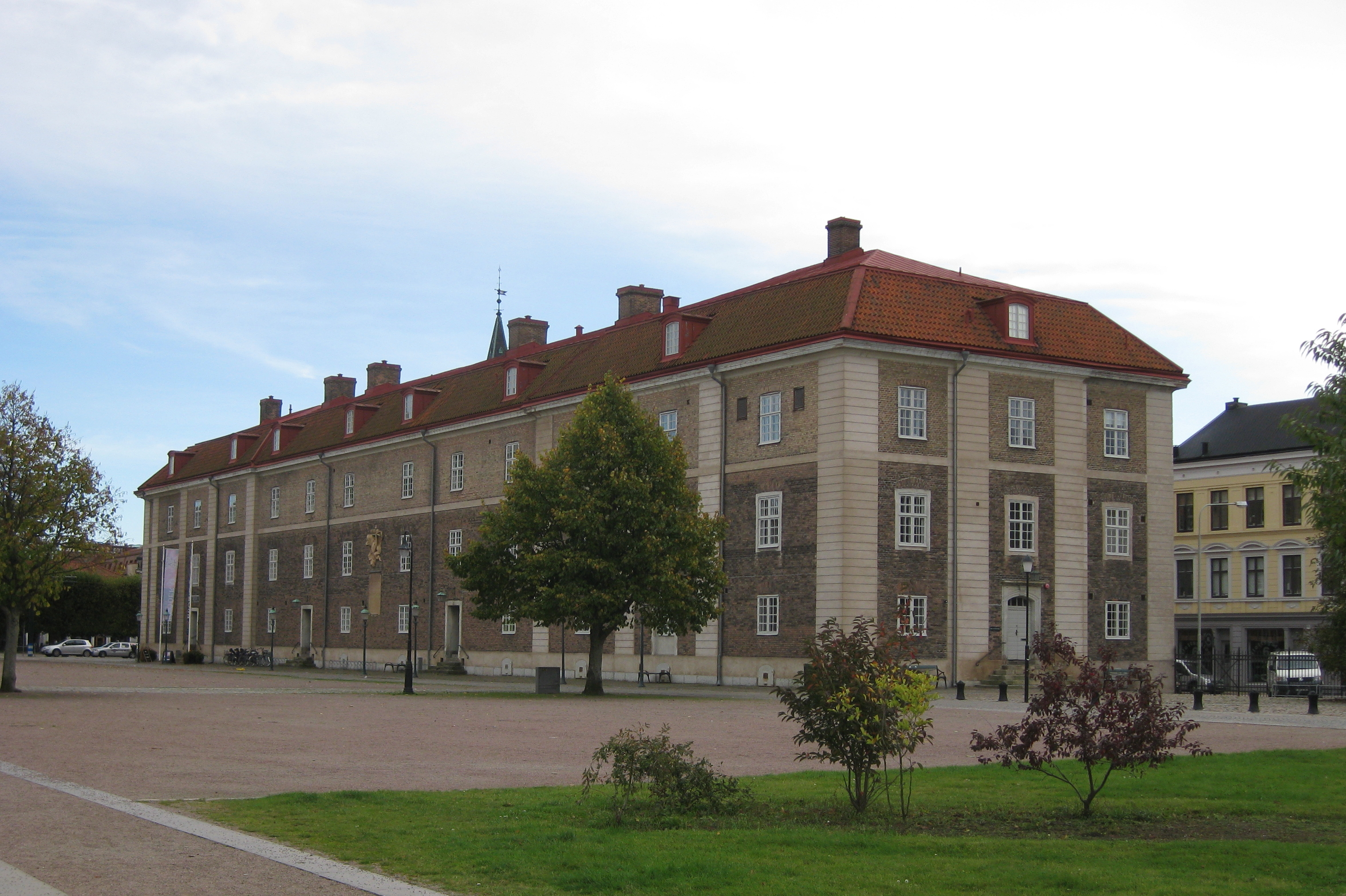
Barracks, Landskrona

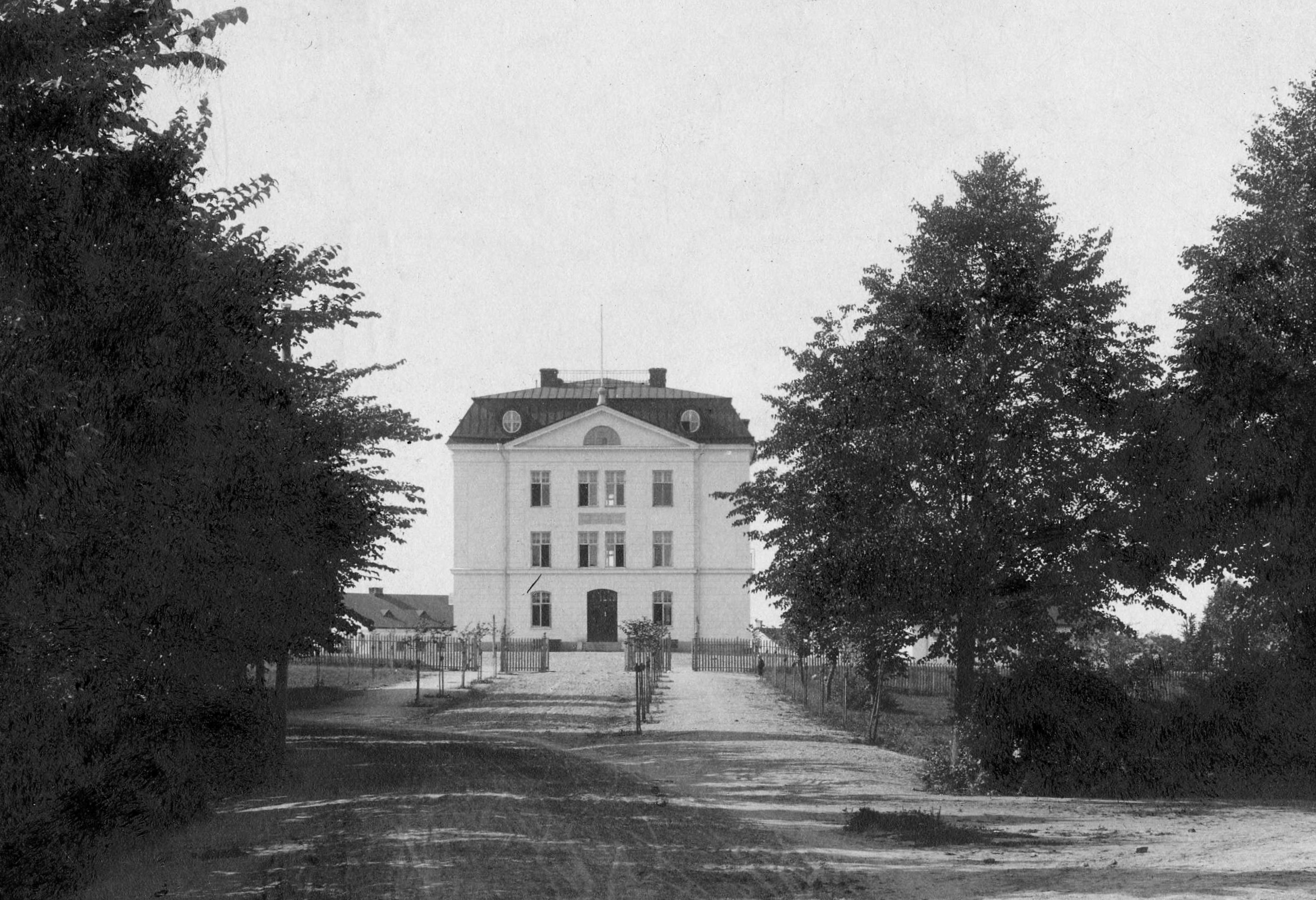
Chancery building, Hässleholm

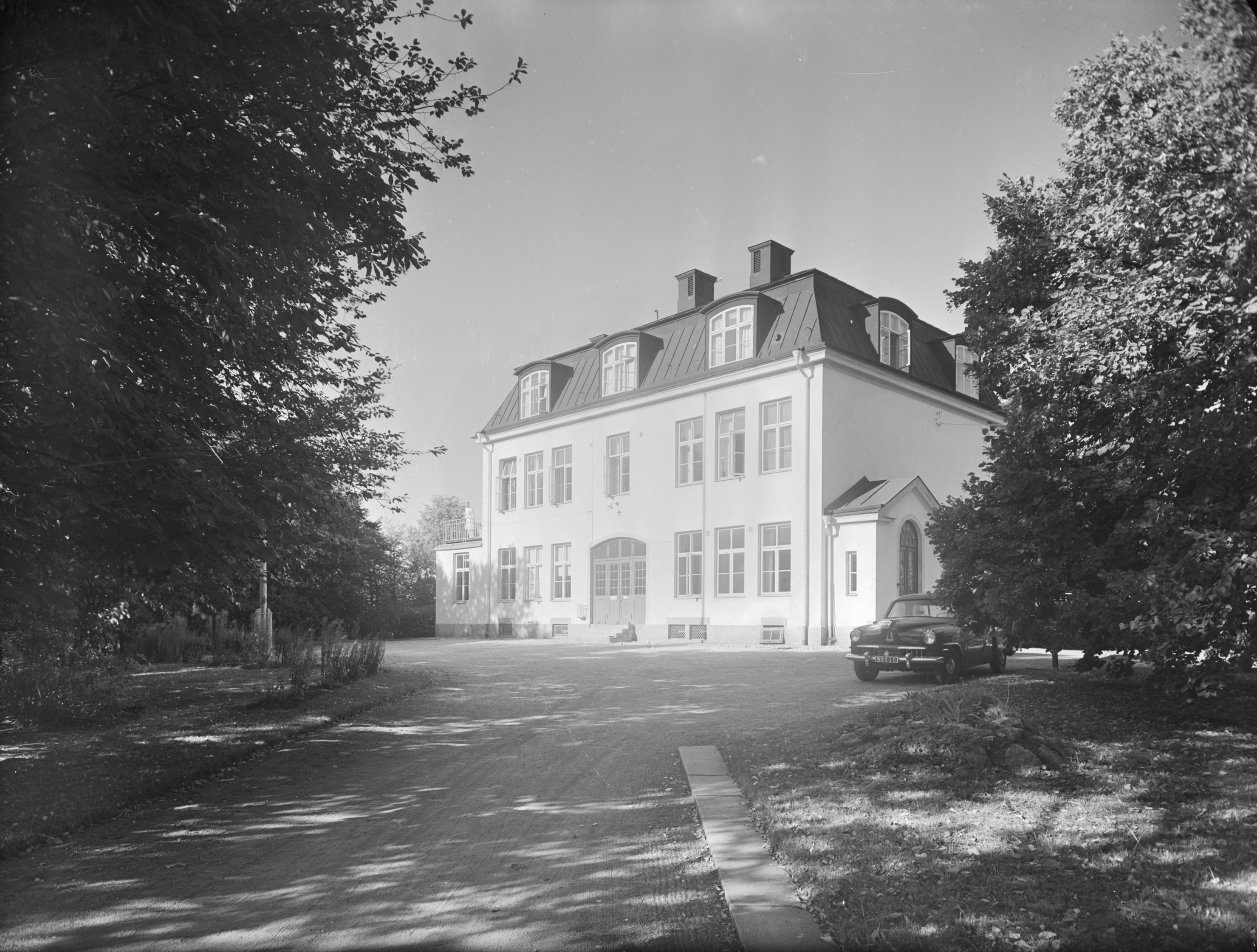
Hospital, Hässleholm

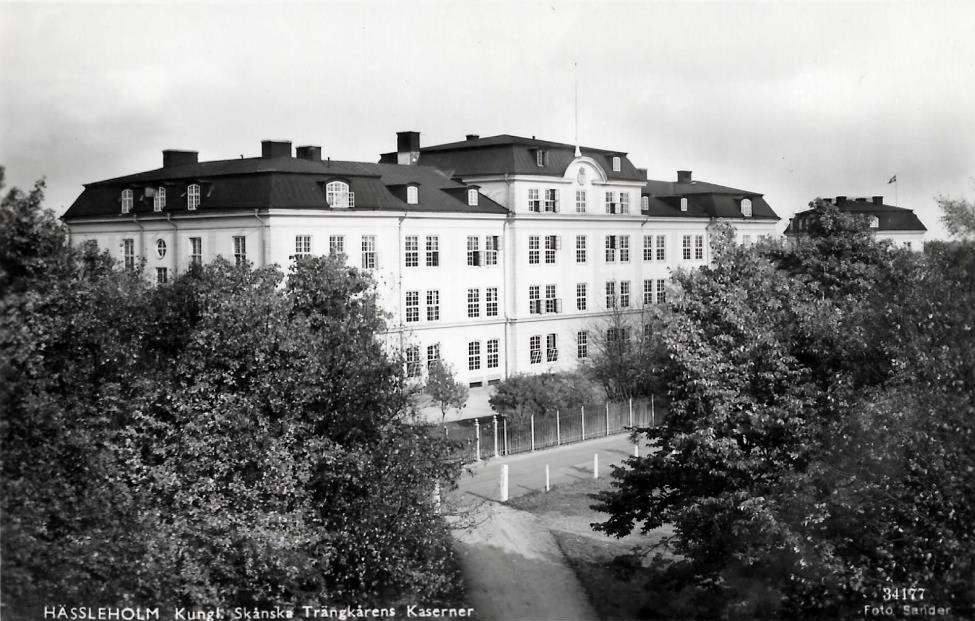
Barracks, Hässleholm

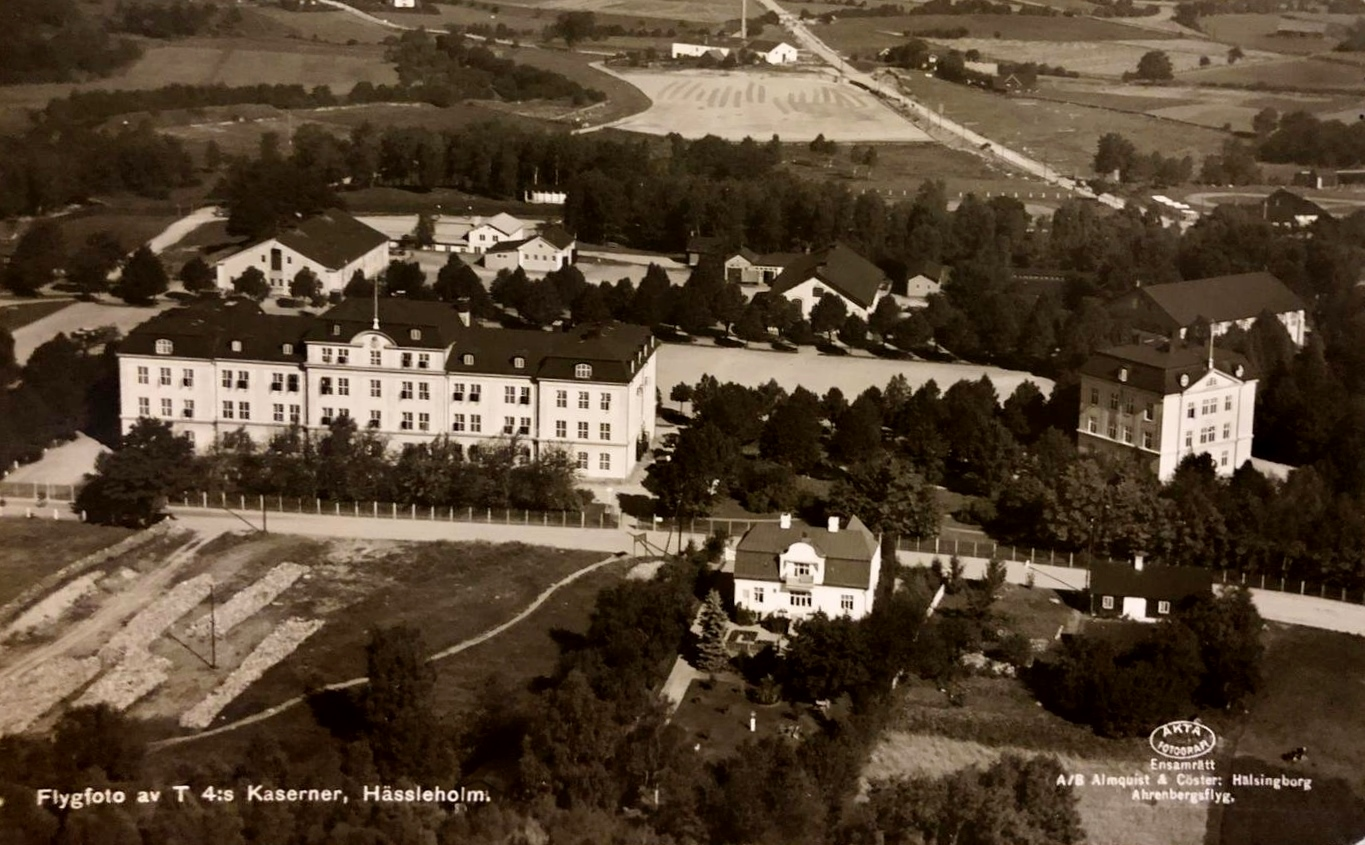
Aerial view, Hässleholm

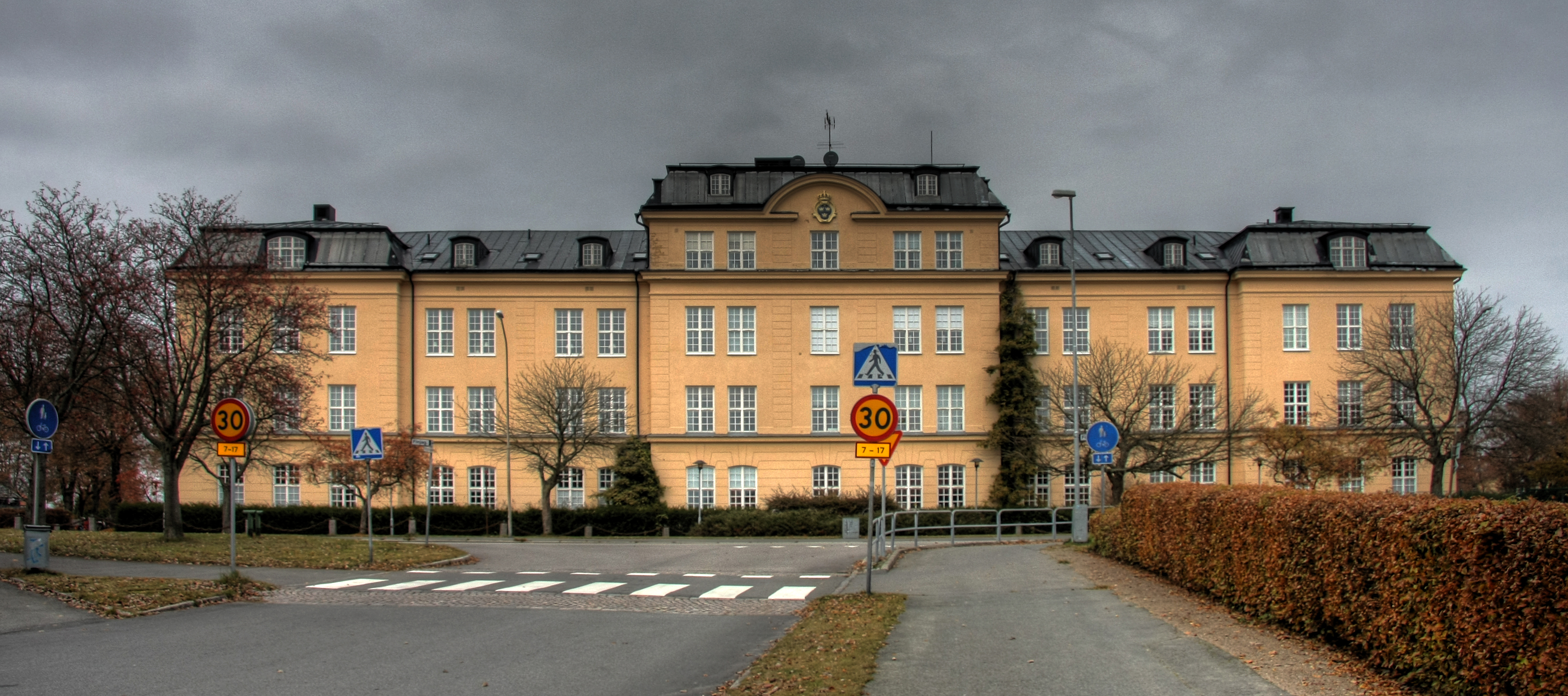
Barracks, Hässleholm

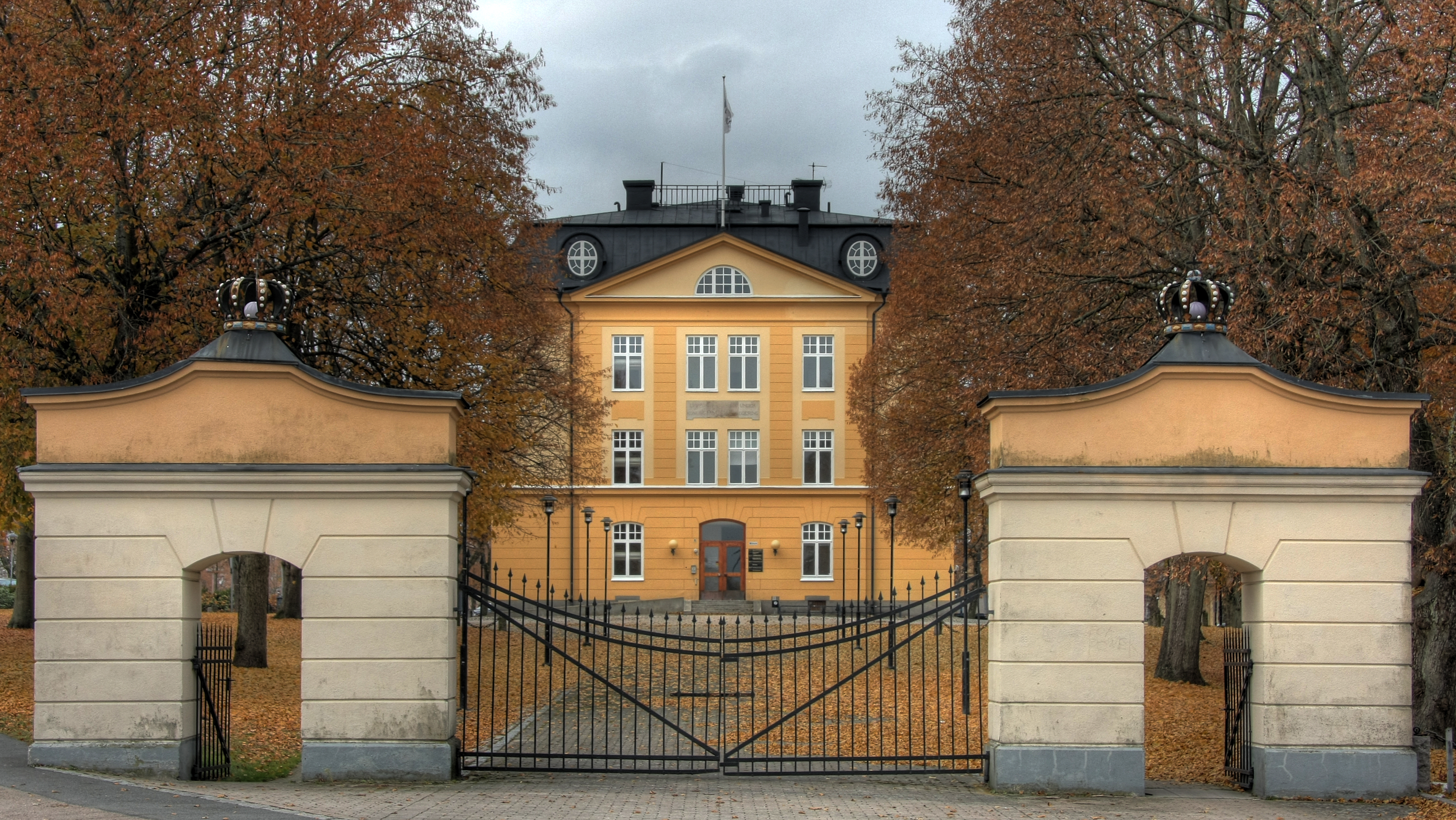
Barracks, Hässleholm

=== Detachment ===
Between 1946 and 1958, the unit had four detachments:

==== Delary ====
T 4 D was formed on 1 January 1946 and was a mobilization center in Delary. The center was disbanded on 31 March 1957, and transformed into a storage location for T 4.

==== Kristianstad ====
T 4 K was formed on 1 October 1947, and was a medical company from T 4, which was located in Kristianstad, for the purpose of training combat medics from the infantry. The detachment was disbanded on 31 October 1956.

==== Revingehed ====
T 4 R was formed on 1 October 1949, and was two medical companies from T 4, which were located in Revingehed due to lack of space in Hässleholm. The medical companies trained combat medics in the infantry. The detachment was disbanded on 31 January 1958.

==== Vetlanda ====
T 4 V was formed on 1 January 1946 and was a mobilization center in Vetlanda. The center was disbanded on 31 March 1957, and converted into a storage location for T 4.

== Heraldry and traditions ==
=== Coat of arms ===
The coat of the arms of the unit was used from 1977 to 1994. Blazon: "Or, the provincial badge of Scania, an erazed head of a griffin gules, with open crown and arms azure. The shield surmounted a cart wheel of four spokes and beneath two swords in saltire, argent".

=== Colours, standards and guidons ===
The regiment's colour was established by General Order No. 1228/1935. The cloth is light blue and shows in the middle the lesser coat of arms of Sweden surrounded by white rays and tongues. In the upper inner corner is affixed the head of a griffin in the provincial badge of Scania, red and crowned with a yellow open crown.

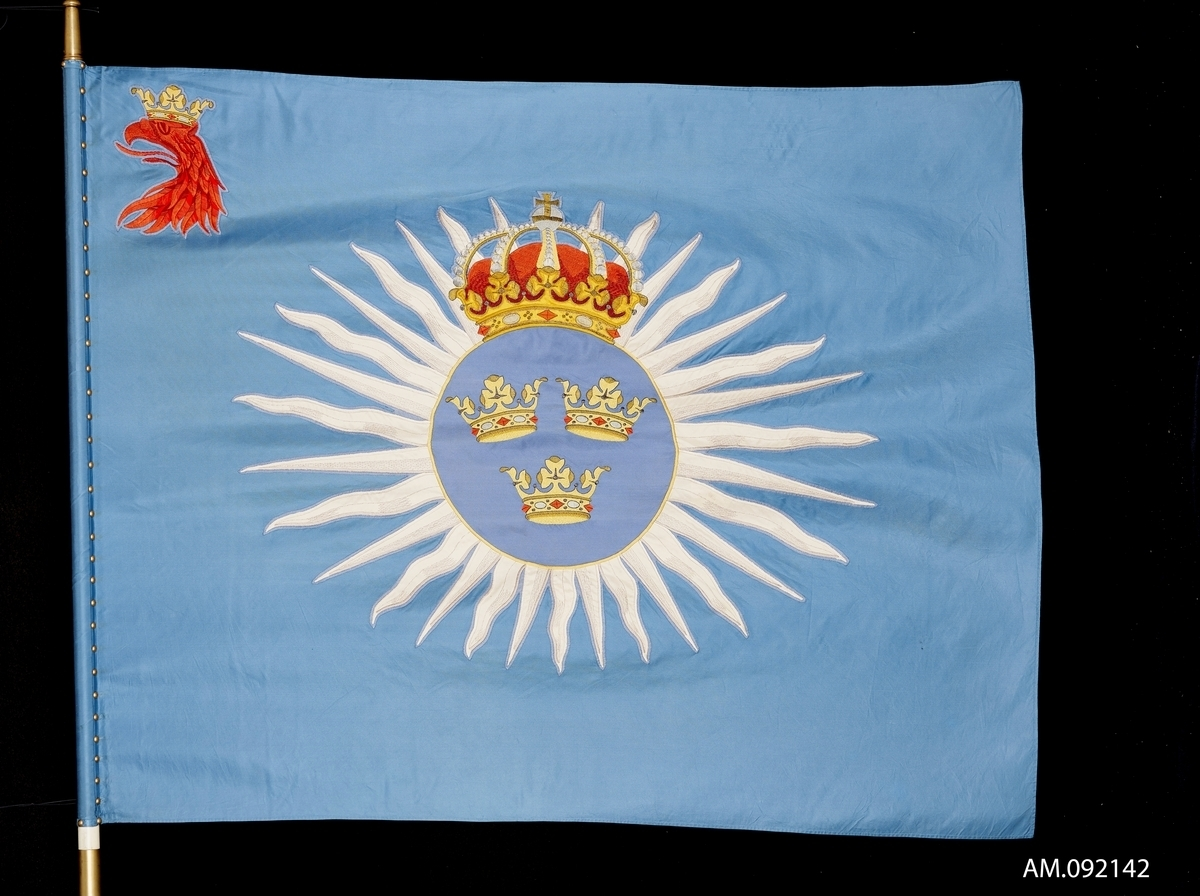
Colour

=== Medals ===
In 1994, the Skånska trängbataljonens (T 4) förtjänstmedalj i silver ("Scanian Logistic Battalion (T 4) Medal of Merit") in silver (SkåntrbatSM) of the 8th size was established. In 1997, this medal became the Skånska trängbataljonens (T 4) minnesmedalj ("Scanian Logistic Battalion (T 4) Commemorative Medal") in bronze (SkåntrbatMSM) of the 8th size. The medal ribbon is of white moiréwith broad blue edges and a red line on the middle.

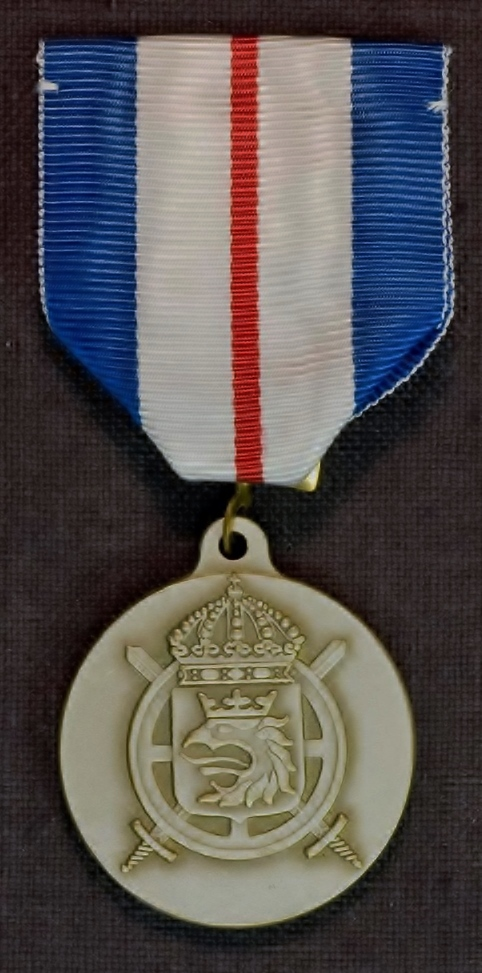
Commemorative medal

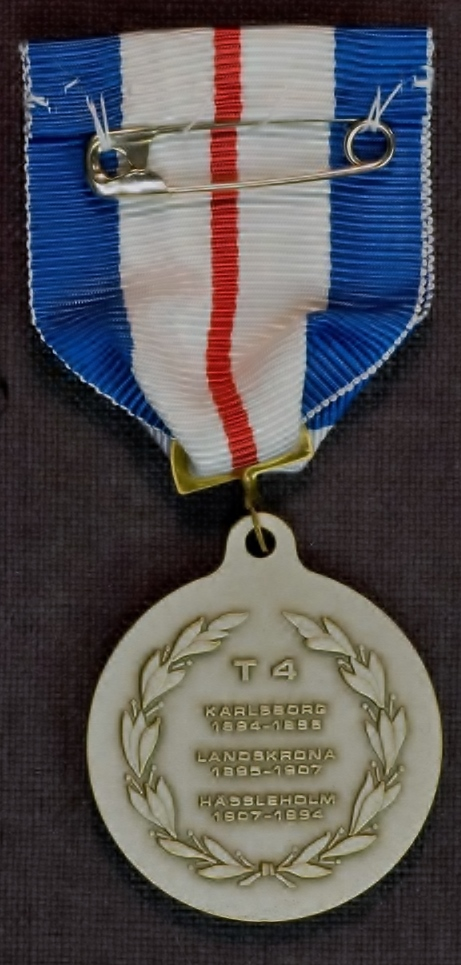
Commemorative medal

== Commanding officers ==
- 1894–1907: Colonel Ivar Virgin
- 1907–1915: Colonel Georg von Heideman
- 1915–1917: Major Knut Palm
- 1917–1925: Lieutenant Colonel Carl Möller
- 1925–1933: Lieutenant Colonel Adolf Johnsson
- 1933–1942: Colonel Julius Nordlindh
- 1942–1949: Colonel Knut Hagberg
- 1949–1952: Colonel Adolf Norberg
- 1952–1955: Colonel Per Kellin
- 1955–1960: Colonel Birger Hasselrot
- 1960–1971: Colonel Folke Nordström
- 1971–1977: Colonel Nils-Olof Lindner
- 1977–1983: Colonel Rune Morell
- 1983–1988: Colonel Göran Wetterlundh
- 1988–1991: Colonel Bengt Yman
- 1991–1992: Lieutenant Colonel Torsten Hansén
- 1992–1994: Lieutenant Colonel Nils-Olof Johansson

== Names, designations and locations ==
Note: The word träng ("train") as in trängregemente is translated to either "train", "service force"; "transport"; "baggage"; "supply vehicles" pl.; (Br) "army service corps", (US) "maintenance and supply troops", "transportation" (adj.), or "logistic".

Name	Translation	From		To
Kungl. Wendes trängbataljon	Royal Wendes Logistic Battalion	1894-10-01	–	1901-12-31
Kungl. Wendes trängkår	Royal Wendes Logistic Corps	1902-01-01	–	1904-12-07
Kungl. Skånska trängkåren	Royal Scanian Logistic Corps	1904-12-08	–	1949-06-30
Kungl. Skånska trängregementet	Royal Scanian Logistic Regiment	1949-07-01	–	1974-12-31
Skånska trängregementet	Scanian Logistic Regiment	1975-01-01	–	1991-06-30
Skånska trängbataljonen	Scanian Logistic Battalion	1991-07-01	–	1994-06-30
Designation		From		To
No 4		1894-10-01	–	1914-09-30
T 4		1914-10-01	–	1991-06-30
P 2/T 4		1991-07-01	–	1994-06-30
Location		From		To
Karlsborg Garrison		1894-09-10	–	1895-05-08
Landskrona Garrison		1895-05-09	–	1907-10-17
Hässleholm Garrison		1907-10-03	–	1994-06-30

== See also ==
- List of Swedish logistic regiments
