= Chief of Army (Sweden) =

Most senior appointment in the Swedish Army

- Arméchef (Swedish)
- Flag of the Chief of Army

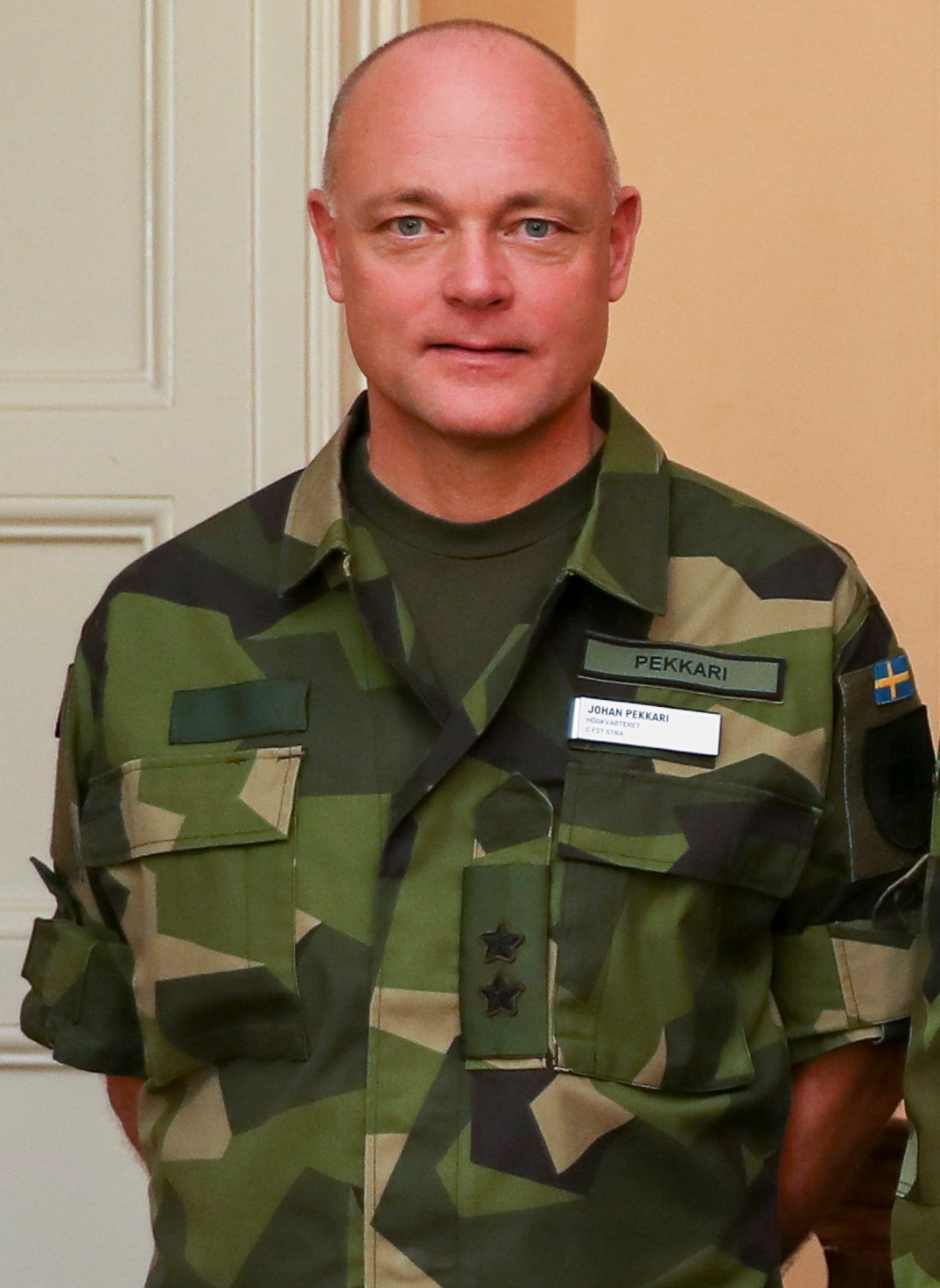
- Incumbent; Major General Johan Pekkari since 28 August 2026
- Swedish Army
- Type: Branch chief
- Abbreviation: AC
- Reports to: Chief of Armed Forces Training & Procurement
- Seat: Swedish Armed Forces Headquarters, Stockholm, Sweden
- Nominator: The Minister of Defence
- Appointer: The Government
- Constituting instrument: FIB 2020:5, Chapter 13 a
- Formation: 1937
- First holder: Oscar Nygren
- Deputy: Deputy chief

The Chief of Army (Swedish: arméchef, lit. 'Army Chief', AC) is the most senior appointment in the Swedish Army. The position Chief of Army was introduced in 1937 and the current form in 2014.

== History ==
In 1937, the staff agency "Chief of the Army" (Swedish: Chefen för armén, CA) was created to lead the army in peace time. The CA would under the King in Council exercise the highest military leadership of the Land Defense (Swedish: Lantförsvaret). At his side, the CA had an Army Staff to assist the CA in his duties. Before 1937 the Chief of the General Staff was considered to be the Chief of Army, but he was not usually to the rank of chief, but formally only the king's chief of staff in his capacity as Supreme Commander of the Swedish Armed Forces. The oldest general was chairman of the special preparatory body called the Generals Commission (Generalskommissionen).

Following a larger reorganization of the Swedish Armed Forces in 1994, the staff agency Chief of the Army ceased to exist as an independent agency. Instead, the post Chief of Army Command (Swedish: Chefen för arméledningen) was created at the then newly instituted Swedish Armed Forces Headquarters. In 1998, the Swedish Armed Forces was again reorganized. Most of the duties of the Chief of Army Command were transferred to the newly instituted post of "Inspector General of the Army" (Swedish: generalinspektören för armén). The post is similar to that of the "Inspector General of the Swedish Navy" (Swedish: Generalinspektören för marinen) and the "Inspector General of the Swedish Air Force" (Swedish: Generalinspektören för flygvapnet). It was later renamed to "Inspector of the Army" (Swedish: Arméinspektören) on 1 January 2003. The position of Inspector of the Army had previously been used in from 1942 to 1949 for the head of the Army Inspectorate (Arméinspektionen).

On 1 January 2014, the "Chief of Army" (Swedish: Arméchefen, AC) position was reinstated in the Swedish Armed Forces. The position has not the same duties as before.

== Tasks ==
Tasks of the Chief of Army:

- Lead the units which the Chief of Swedish Armed Forces Training and Development has distributed
- To the Chief of Swedish Armed Forces Training and Development propose the development of the units' abilities
- Being the foremost representative of the units
- Represent the units and the area of ability in international contacts

== Heraldry ==
The command flag of the Chief of Army is drawn by Brita Grep and embroidered by hand by the Kedja studio, Heraldica. Blazon: "Fessed in yellow and blue; on yellow two blue batons of command with sets of yellow crowns placed two and one in saltire, on blue two yellow swords in saltire."

== List of chiefs ==
No.	Portrait	Name	Took office	Left office	Time in office	Chief of Defence	Ref.
Chief of the Army (Chefen för armén)
–	Oscar Nygren	Lieutenant general Oscar Nygren (1872–1960); Acting	1 July 1936	1 October 1937	1 year, 92 days	–	
–	Olof Thörnell	Lieutenant general Olof Thörnell (1877–1977); Acting	15 July 1937	17 July 1937	2 days	–	
–	Axel Lyström	Lieutenant general Axel Lyström (1873–1945); Acting	19 July 1937	2 August 1937	14 days	–	
–	Lennart Lilliehöök	Lieutenant general Lennart Lilliehöök (1872–1950); Acting	3 August 1937	14 August 1937	11 days	–	
1	Per Sylvan	Lieutenant general Per Sylvan (1875–1945)	1 October 1937	1 October 1940	3 years, 0 days	Olof Thörnell (Note: From 8 December 1939.)	-
–	Oscar Osterman	Major general Oscar Osterman (1874–1956); Acting	10 October 1938; 13 October 1938	10 October 1938; 14 October 1938	3 days	–	
–	Göran Gyllenstierna	Major general Göran Gyllenstierna (1876–1968); Acting	11 October 1938; 15 October 1938	12 October 1938; 22 October 1938	10 days	–	
–	Göran Gyllenstierna	Major general Göran Gyllenstierna (1876–1968); Acting	16 July 1939	15 August 1939	30 days	–	
2	Ivar Holmquist	Lieutenant general Ivar Holmquist (1879–1954)	1 October 1940	31 March 1944	3 years, 182 days	Olof Thörnell	
3	Archibald Douglas	Lieutenant general Archibald Douglas (1883–1960)	1 April 1944	30 September 1948	4 years, 182 days	Helge Jung	
4	Carl August Ehrensvärd	Lieutenant general Carl August Ehrensvärd (1892–1974)	1 October 1948	30 September 1957	8 years, 364 days	Helge Jung; Nils Swedlund	
5	Thord Bonde	Lieutenant general Thord Bonde (1900–1969)	1 October 1957	30 September 1963	5 years, 364 days	Nils Swedlund; Torsten Rapp	
6	Curt Göransson	Lieutenant general Curt Göransson (1909–1996)	1 October 1963	30 September 1969	5 years, 364 days	Torsten Rapp	
7	Carl Eric Almgren	Lieutenant general Carl Eric Almgren (1913–2001)	1 October 1969	1 October 1976	7 years, 0 days	Torsten Rapp; Stig Synnergren	
8	Nils Sköld	Lieutenant general Nils Sköld (1921–1996)	1 October 1976	31 March 1984	7 years, 182 days	Stig Synnergren; Lennart Ljung	
9	Erik G. Bengtsson	Lieutenant general Erik G. Bengtsson (1928–2025)	1 April 1984	1 April 1990	6 years, 0 days	Lennart Ljung; Bengt Gustafsson	
10	Åke Sagrén	Lieutenant general Åke Sagrén (1935–2022)	1 April 1990	30 June 1994	4 years, 90 days	Bengt Gustafsson	
Chief of Army Command (Chef för arméledningen)
10	Åke Sagrén	Lieutenant general Åke Sagrén (1935–2022)	1 July 1994	30 March 1996	1 year, 273 days	Owe Wiktorin	
11	Mertil Melin	Lieutenant general Mertil Melin (1935–2023)	1 April 1996	1998	1–2 years	Owe Wiktorin	
Inspector General of the Army (Generalinspektör för armén)
12	Paul Degerlund	Major general Paul Degerlund (born 1948)	1998	30 June 2000	1–2 years	Owe Wiktorin	-
13	Alf Sandqvist	Major general Alf Sandqvist (born 1945)	1 July 2000	31 December 2002	2 years, 183 days	Johan Hederstedt	
Inspector of the Army (Arméinspektör)
13	Alf Sandqvist	Major general Alf Sandqvist (born 1945)	1 January 2003	31 May 2005	2 years, 150 days	Johan Hederstedt; Håkan Syrén	
14	Sverker Göranson	Major general Sverker Göranson (born 1954)	31 May 2005	1 November 2007	2 years, 154 days	Håkan Syrén	-
15	Berndt Grundevik	Major general Berndt Grundevik (born 1956)	1 November 2007	13 September 2012	4 years, 317 days	Håkan Syrén; Sverker Göranson	
16	Anders Brännström	Major general Anders Brännström (born 1957)	13 September 2012	20 December 2013	1 year, 98 days	Sverker Göranson	
Chief of Army (Arméchef)
16	Anders Brännström	Major general Anders Brännström (born 1957)	20 December 2013	1 June 2016	2 years, 164 days	Sverker Göranson; Micael Bydén	
17	Karl Engelbrektson	Major general Karl Engelbrektson (born 1962)	1 June 2016	17 June 2023	7 years, 16 days	Micael Bydén	
18	Jonny Lindfors	Major general Jonny Lindfors (born 1975)	18 June 2023	26 June 2026	3 years, 8 days	Micael Bydén; Michael Claesson	
–	Per Nilsson [sv]	Brigadier general Per Nilsson (born 1969); Acting	26 June 2026	Incumbent	63 days	Michael Claesson	
19	Johan Pekkari	Major general Johan Pekkari (born 1971)	28 August 2026	Incumbent	11 days	Michael Claesson	

== List of deputy chiefs ==
Portrait	Name	Took office	Left office	Time in office	Chief of Defence	Ref.
Deputy Chief of Army (Ställföreträdande arméchef)
Fredrik Ståhlberg	Brigadier general Fredrik Ståhlberg (born 1966)	September 2017	31 January 2020	2–3 years	Micael Bydén	
Laura Swaan Wrede	Brigadier general Laura Swaan Wrede (born 1964)	31 March 2020	30 September 2022	2 years, 183 days	Micael Bydén	
Anders Svensson [sv]	Brigadier general Anders Svensson (born 1965)	1 October 2022	1 September 2024	1 year, 336 days	Micael Bydén	
Per Nilsson [sv]	Brigadier general Per Nilsson (born 1969)	16 September 2024	Incumbent	1 year, 357 days	Michael Claesson	

== See also ==
- Chief of Air Force
- Chief of Navy
