= Chief of the Defence Staff (Sweden) =

Chief of staff of the Chief of Defence of the Swedish Armed Forces

- Chefen för försvarsstaben

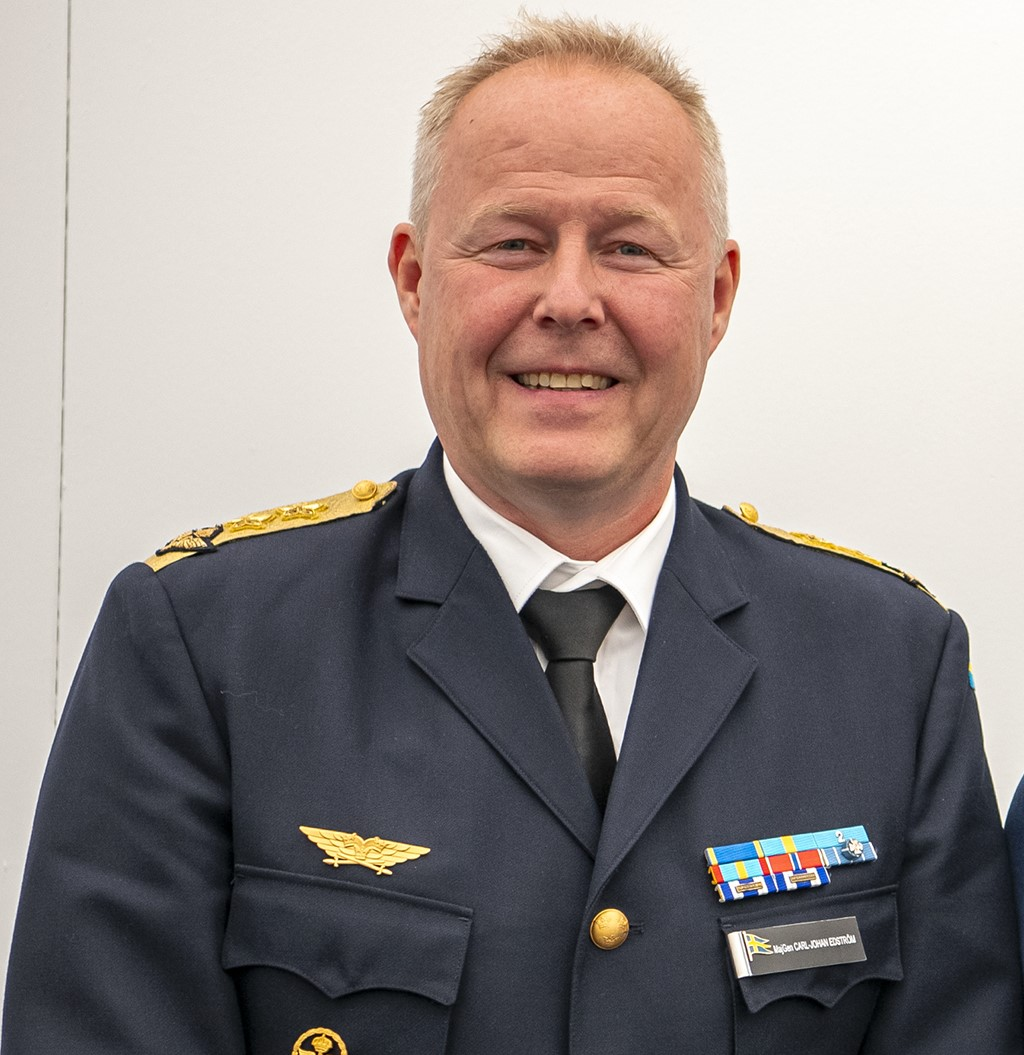
- Incumbent; LtGen Carl-Johan Edström since 1 October 2024
- Ministry of Defence
- Type: Chief of the Defence Staff
- Abbreviation: C FST
- Reports to: Chief of Defence
- Seat: Armed Forces Headquarters
- Term length: No fixed term
- Precursor: Chief of the General Staff (1st incarnation); Chief of Defence Staff (2nd incarnation)
- Formation: 1 July 1937 (1st incarnation); 1 January 2023 (2nd incarnation)
- First holder: MajGen Olof Thörnell
- Final holder: VAdm Peter Nordbeck (1st incarnation); VAdm Jonas Haggren (2nd incarnation)
- Abolished: 1993
- Unofficial names: Försvarsstabschef
- Deputy: Deputy Chief of the Defence Staff

The Chief of the Defence Staff (Swedish: Chefen för försvarsstaben, C FST, or Försvarsstabschef) is the second most senior uniformed member of the Swedish Armed Forces (after the Chief of Defence) and heads the Defence Staff. The Chief of the Defence Staff reports to the Chief of Defence and serves as their chief of staff.

== History ==
The position was created in 1937 as a successor to the Chief of the General Staff which was abolished the same year. The position was held by a senior member of one of the three main branches of the Swedish Armed Forces until 1993 when the position was abolished when the Defence Staff was disbanded. Between 2007 and 2022, the Ledningsstaben (LEDS) in the Swedish Armed Forces Headquarters was called the Defence Staff in English and was commanded by the Chief of Defence Staff (Chefen för ledningsstaben, C LEDS). The Chief of the Defence Staff position was re-established on 1 January 2023 after the Defence Staff (Ledningsstaben, LEDS) was abolished.

== Tasks ==
The Chief of the Defence Staff serves as the Chief of Defence's chief of staff. In this role, the Chief of the Defence Staff, under the Chief of Defence, is responsible for coordinating strategic planning and military strategic command, and for ensuring that all matters, inquiries, and tasks submitted to the authority are processed and prepared as their nature requires. This responsibility includes coordinating activities within the Swedish Armed Forces Headquarters, as well as ensuring that decisions made by the authority's leadership are implemented, monitored, and that results are reported back to the leadership.

== Chiefs of the Defence Staff ==
No.	Portrait	Chief of the Defence Staff	Took office	Left office	Time in office	Defence branch	Chief of Defence (Note: Supreme Commander 1937–2024, Chief of Defence 2024–present.)	Ref.
1937–1993
1	Olof Thörnell	Lieutenant general Olof Thörnell (1877–1977)	1 July 1937 (Note: On 1 July 1936, the then Inspector General of the Infantry, Major General Olof Thörnell, was promoted to lieutenant general and at the same time appointed Chief of the Defence Staff. Thörnell now began the organization work. On 1 July 1937, the new staff gathered and the Chief of Defence Staff took command.)	December 1939 (Note: On 8 December 1939, Thörnell was appointed Supreme Commander of the Swedish Armed Forces without at the same time appointing a new Chief of the Defence Staff. After Thörnell's appointment as Supreme Commander for the mobilized elements of the armed forces in December 1939, Major General Axel Rappe was appointed Deputy Chief of the Defence Staff. This meant that Rappe in reality served as Chief of the Defence Staff.)	1–2 years	Army	–	
2	Axel Bredberg	Major general Axel Bredberg (1884–1960)	1 July 1942	15 November 1945 (Note: Bredberg was granted a leave of absence on 21 January 1944. He did not return to the post but officially left the post on 15 November 1945 when he was appointed military commander of the V Military District.)	1 year, 204 days	Army	Olof Thörnell; Helge Jung	
-	Carl August Ehrensvärd	Major general Carl August Ehrensvärd (1892–1974); Acting	22 January 1944	15 November 1945	1 year, 297 days	Army	Olof Thörnell; Helge Jung	
3	Carl August Ehrensvärd	Major general Carl August Ehrensvärd (1892–1974)	15 November 1945	30 April 1947	3 years, 98 days	Army	Helge Jung	
4	Nils Swedlund	Major general Nils Swedlund (1898–1965)	1 April 1947 (Note: Appointed on 25 February.)	1 April 1951	4 years, 0 days	Army	Helge Jung	
5	Richard Åkerman	Major general Richard Åkerman (1898–1981)	1 April 1951	30 September 1957	6 years, 182 days	Army	Nils Swedlund	
-	Curt Göransson	Major general Curt Göransson (1909–1996); Acting	1 April 1957	30 September 1957	182 days	Army	Nils Swedlund	
6	Curt Göransson	Major general Curt Göransson (1909–1996)	1 October 1957	30 September 1961	3 years, 364 days	Army	Nils Swedlund	
7	Carl Eric Almgren	Major general Carl Eric Almgren (1913–2001)	1 October 1961	30 March 1967	5 years, 180 days	Army	Torsten Rapp	
8	Stig Synnergren	Lieutenant general Stig Synnergren (1915–2004)	1 April 1967	30 September 1970	3 years, 182 days	Army	Torsten Rapp	
9	Bo Westin	Lieutenant general Bo Westin (1913–2009)	1 October 1970	30 September 1972	1 year, 365 days	Navy (Coastal Artillery)	Stig Synnergren	
10	Gunnar Eklund	Lieutenant general Gunnar Eklund (1920–2010)	1 October 1972	30 September 1976	3 years, 365 days	Navy (Coastal Artillery)	Stig Synnergren	
10	Lennart Ljung	Lieutenant general Lennart Ljung (1921–1990)	1 October 1976	30 September 1978	1 year, 364 days	Army	Stig Synnergren	
11	Bengt Schuback	Vice admiral Bengt Schuback (1928–2015)	1 October 1978	30 September 1982	3 years, 364 days	Navy	Ola Ullsten; Lennart Ljung	
12	Bror Stefenson	Vice admiral Bror Stefenson (1929–2018)	1 October 1982	31 March 1987	4 years, 181 days	Navy	Lennart Ljung; Bengt Gustafsson	
13	Torsten Engberg	Lieutenant general Torsten Engberg (1934–2018)	1 April 1987	30 June 1991	4 years, 90 days	Navy (Coastal Artillery)	Bengt Gustafsson	
14	Owe Wiktorin	Lieutenant general Owe Wiktorin (born 1940)	1 July 1991	30 September 1992	0–1 years	Air Force	Bengt Gustafsson	
15	Peter Nordbeck	Vice admiral Peter Nordbeck (born 1938)	1 October 1992	1993	0–1 years	Navy	Bengt Gustafsson	
2023–present
1	Michael Claesson	Lieutenant general Michael Claesson (born 1965)	1 January 2023	30 September 2024	1 year, 273 days	Army	Micael Bydén	
2	Carl-Johan Edström	Lieutenant general Carl-Johan Edström (born 1967)	1 October 2024	Incumbent	1 year, 341 days	Air Force	Michael Claesson	

== Vice Chiefs of the Defence Staff ==
No.	Portrait	Vice/Deputy Chief of the Defence Staff	Title	Took office	Left office	Time in office	Defence branch	Chief of Defence	Ref.
1	Axel Rappe	Major general Axel Rappe (1884–1945)	Deputy Chief (Ställföreträdande chef)	15 December 1939	31 March 1941	1 year, 106 days	Army	Olof Thörnell	(Note: During the winter of 1939, when Axel Rappe was commanding officer of the Svea Artillery Regiment in Stockholm, he was made available for service to the Chief of the Defence Staff. After Olof Thörnell's appointment as Supreme Commander for the mobilized elements of the armed forces in December 1939, Rappe was appointed Deputy Chief of the Defence Staff. This meant that Rappe in reality served as Chief of the Defence Staff.)
2	Samuel Åkerhielm	Colonel; Samuel Åkerhielm (1887–1976)	Deputy Chief	3 March 1941	1941	0 years	Army	Olof Thörnell	(Note: Furtenbach (1964) states that Åkerhielm relieved Rappe of command on 3 March 1941 while Cronenberg (1995-1997) states that Rappe served until 31 March 1941. Harnesk (1948) states that Åkerhielm served as Deputy Chief of the Defence Staff no longer than 1941. Furthermore, Furtenbach (1964) states that Åkerhielm was major general while Harnesk (1948) states that Åkerhielm was promoted to major general in 1942, a year after serving as Deputy Chief of the Defence Staff.)
3	Carl August Ehrensvärd	Colonel; Carl August Ehrensvärd (1892–1974)	Vice Chief (Souschef)	1942	1944	1–2 years	Army	Olof Thörnell	
4	Nils Swedlund	Colonel; Nils Swedlund (1898–1965)	Vice Chief	1 January 1944	31 March 1946	2 years, 89 days	Army	Helge Jung	
5	Thord Bonde	Colonel; Thord Bonde (1900–1969)	Vice Chief	1946	1950	3–4 years	Army	Helge Jung	(Note: According to Lagerström (1968) and other sources, Bonde was appointed Vice Chief of the Defence Staff in 1946 and his next appointment was as second-in-command of the Svea Life Guards (I 1) in 1950. However, between these postings, Bonde held the position as Chief of Staff of United Nations Truce Supervision Organization (UNTSO) from May 1948 to July 1948.)
6	Moje Östberg	Captain; Moje Östberg (1897–1984)	Vice Chief	1950	1951	0–1 years	Navy	Helge Jung	
7	Sam Myhrman	Colonel; Sam Myhrman (1912–1965)	Vice Chief	1956	1960	3–4 years	Army	Nils Swedlund	
8	Åke Mangård	Colonel; Åke Mangård (1917–1998)	Vice Chief	1960	1961	0–1 years	Air Force	Nils Swedlund	
9	Dag Arvas	Captain; Dag Arvas (1913–2004)	Vice Chief	1961	1964	2–3 years	Navy	Torsten Rapp	
10	Bengt Lundvall	Captain; Bengt Lundvall (1915–2010)	Vice Chief	1964	1966	1–2 years	Navy	Torsten Rapp	
11	Bo Westin	Major general Bo Westin (1913–2009)	Vice Chief	1966	1968	1–2 years	Navy (Coastal Artillery)	Torsten Rapp	
12	Dick Stenberg	Major general Dick Stenberg (1921–2004)	Vice Chief	1 October 1968	1 April 1970	1 year, 182 days	Air Force	Torsten Rapp	
13	Nils-Fredrik Palmstierna	Major general (Note: Palmstierna was colonel when taking office on 1 April and was promoted to major general on 1 October the same year.); Nils-Fredrik Palmstierna (1919–1990)	Vice Chief	1 April 1970	1973	2–3 years	Air Force	Stig Synnergren	
14	Sven-Olof Olson	Major general Sven-Olof Olson (1926–2021)	Vice Chief	1973	1977	3–4 years	Air Force	Stig Synnergren	
15	Bengt Schuback	Rear admiral Bengt Schuback (1928–2015)	Vice Chief	1 July 1977	30 September 1978	1 year, 91 days	Navy	Stig Synnergren	
16	Bengt Lehander	Major general Bengt Lehander (1925–1994)	Vice Chief	1 October 1978	30 September 1982	3 years, 364 days	Air Force	Lennart Ljung	
17	Lars-Bertil Persson	Major general Lars-Bertil Persson (born 1934)	Deputy Chief	1 October 1982	1986	3–4 years	Air Force	Lennart Ljung	
18	Owe Wiktorin	Major general Owe Wiktorin (born 1940)	Deputy Chief	1986	30 June 1991	4–5 years	Air Force	Bengt Gustafsson	
2023–present
1	Jens Nykvist	Rear admiral Jens Nykvist (born 1968)	Deputy Chief	1 July 2023	Incumbent	3 years, 98 days	Navy	Micael Bydén; Michael Claesson	

== See also ==
- Chief of the General Staff (1873–1937)
- Chief of Defence Staff (2007–2022)
