= Richard Åkerman =

Swedish military officer (1898–1981)

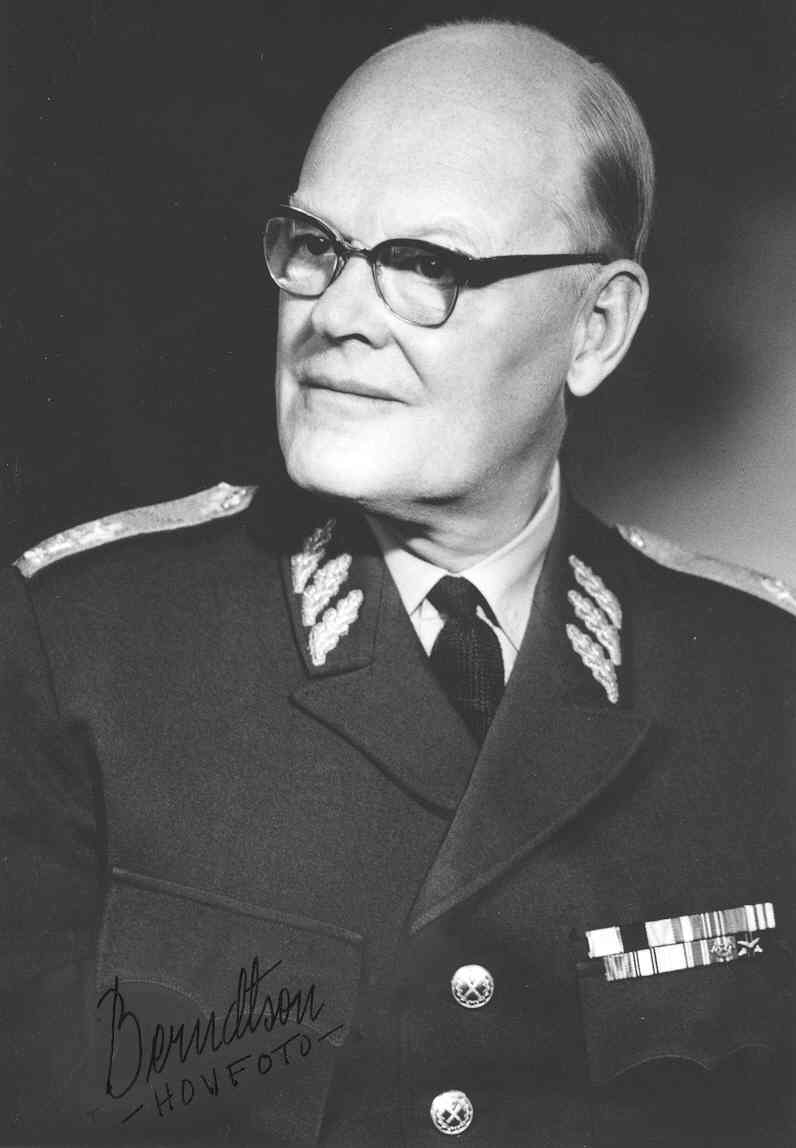
- Born: Richard Oscar Roger Åkerman; 6 July 1898; Stockholm, Sweden
- Died: 23 June 1981 (aged 82); Sweden
- Burial place: Norra begravningsplatsen
- Relatives: Gustav Åkerman (brother)
- Military career
- Allegiance: Sweden
- Branch: Swedish Army
- Service years: 1919–1963
- Rank: Lieutenant General (Swedish Army); Lieutenant Colonel (Finnish Army)
- Nickname: "Riri"
- Commands: Army Staff College; Östgöta Anti-Aircraft Regiment; Inspector, Control and Reporting System; Chief of the Defence Staff; III Military District
- Conflicts: Winter War

Lieutenant General Richard "Riri" Oscar Roger Åkerman (6 July 1898 – 23 June 1981) was a senior Swedish Army officer. Åkerman had an extensive military career in both the Swedish and Finnish Armies. He began as a second lieutenant in 1919 and later became a captain in the General Staff. He held various roles, including serving as head of the Air Defense Office and artillery battery commander. Åkerman joined the Finnish Army during the Winter War and reached the rank of lieutenant colonel.

Upon returning to Sweden, he resumed his military service and held positions such as head of the Royal Swedish Army Staff College and commander of the Östgöta Anti-Aircraft Regiment. He was appointed Inspector of the Control and Reporting System of the Swedish Air Force and Chief of the Defence Staff, serving concurrently as head of the Swedish National Defence College. Åkerman continued his involvement in defense-related commissions and organizations. He also held leadership positions in various non-military organizations, including the Bromma Air Protection Association and the Swedish Red Cross.

== Early life ==
Åkerman was born on 6 July 1898 in Stockholm, Sweden, the son of the Lieutenant General Joakim (Jockum) Åkerman and Martina Björnstjerna. He was brother of Lieutenant General Gustav Åkerman and the politician Oscar Åkerman. He passed studentexamen in Stockholm in 1916.

== Career ==
Military Career

Åkerman was commissioned as a second lieutenant in the Svea Artillery Regiment (A 1) in 1919 and promoted to lieutenant in 1923. He became a captain in the General Staff in 1931 and served as a General Staff officer for the Western Army Division from 1931 to 1933. From 1934 to 1937, he was the head of the Air Defense Office within the General Staff and then served as an artillery battery commander in the Svea Artillery Regiment from 1937 to 1939. In 1939, Åkerman attained the rank of major in the General Staff Corps and also became a teacher at the Royal Swedish Air Force Staff College.

In 1939, Åkerman left the Swedish Army to join the Finnish Army during the Winter War as part of the Swedish Volunteer Corps. He was promoted to major in the Finnish Army and subsequently to lieutenant colonel in 1940. Later that year, he returned to the Swedish General Staff Corps as a major. Åkerman resumed his teaching role at the Royal Swedish Air Force Staff College from 1941 to 1942 and also taught strategy at the Royal Swedish Army Staff College during the same period. He was promoted to lieutenant colonel in 1941 and to colonel in 1943.

From 1942 to 1946, Åkerman served as head of the Royal Swedish Army Staff College and commanded the Östgöta Anti-Aircraft Regiment (Lv 2) from 1946 to 1948. He was promoted to colonel in the Swedish Air Force and appointed Inspector of the Control and Reporting System of the Swedish Air Force (Inspektören för luftbevakningen) in 1948. Åkerman was promoted to major general and appointed Chief of the Defence Staff in 1951, also serving as head of the Swedish National Defence College from 1951 to 1952. After leaving the Defence Staff in 1957, he became military commander of the III Military District, a position he held until 1963, when he was promoted to lieutenant general.

=== Military career ===
Åkerman was commissioned as a second lieutenant in Svea Artillery Regiment (A 1) in 1919 and lieutenant in 1923. Åkerman became captain of the General Staff in 1931 and was General Staff officer of the Western Army Division from 1931 to 1933. Åkerman was then head of the Air Defense Office in the General Staff from 1934 to 1937 and artillery battery commander of Svea Artillery Regiment from 1937 to 1939. Åkerman was major in the General Staff Corps in 1939 and teacher at the Royal Swedish Air Force Staff College the same year.

He left the Swedish Army in 1939 and joined the Finnish Army during the Winter War as part of the Swedish Volunteer Corps. Åkerman was promoted to major in the Finnish Army and then lieutenant colonel in 1940. He was then again major of the Swedish General Staff Corps in 1940. Åkerman was again teacher at the Royal Swedish Air Force Staff College from 1941 to 1942 and strategy teacher at the Royal Swedish Army Staff College from 1940 to 1942. He became a lieutenant colonel in 1941 and colonel in 1943.

Åkerman was head of the Royal Swedish Army Staff College from 1942 to 1946 and commander of the Östgöta Anti-Aircraft Regiment (Lv 2) from 1946 to 1948. He was promoted to colonel in the Swedish Air Force and was appointed Inspector of the Control and Reporting System of the Swedish Air Force (Inspektören för luftbevakningen) in 1948. Åkerman was promoted to major general and was appointed Chief of the Defence Staff in 1951. He was also serving as head of the Swedish National Defence College from 1951 to 1952. Åkerman left the Defence Staff in 1957 and was then military commander of the III Military District from 1957 to 1963 when he was promoted to lieutenant general.

=== Other work ===
Åkerman was part of the 1930 Defense Commission in 1935 and the 1941 Defense Investigation. He was a member and secretary of the Commission concerning the voluntary acquisition of air defense equipment in 1937, of the King in Council and was representative of the executive committee of Sweden's Landstorm Federations Central Association (Sveriges Landstormsföreningars Centralförbunds verkställande utskott) from 1938 to 1942. Åkerman became a member of the Royal Swedish Academy of War Sciences in 1942. He was chairman of the Bromma Air Protection Association (Bromma luftskyddsförening) from 1944. Åkerman was vice chairman of the central association Society and Defence from 1951 to 1957, chairman of the board of the insurance company Allmänna livförsäkringsbolaget Oden from 1958 to 1959 and the local board of the commercial bank Skaraborgs enskilda bank in Skövde from 1958 to 1969. Furthermore, he was board member of the insurance companies Svenska liv in 1960, Städernas försäkringsbolag in 1964 and Hansa from 1967 to 1969. Åkerman was also chairman of Skaraborg County's district of the Swedish Red Cross from 1964 to 1973.

== Personal life ==
In 1920, Åkerman married Thyra Sellén (1899–1988), the daughter of professor, lieutenant colonel Nils Sellén and Ragnhild Frisk. He was the father of Joachim (1921–1994), Elsie (born 1923) and Thyra (born 1926).

== Death ==
Åkerman died on 23 June 1981 and was buried 6 October 1981 in Norra begravningsplatsen in Stockholm.

== Dates of rank ==
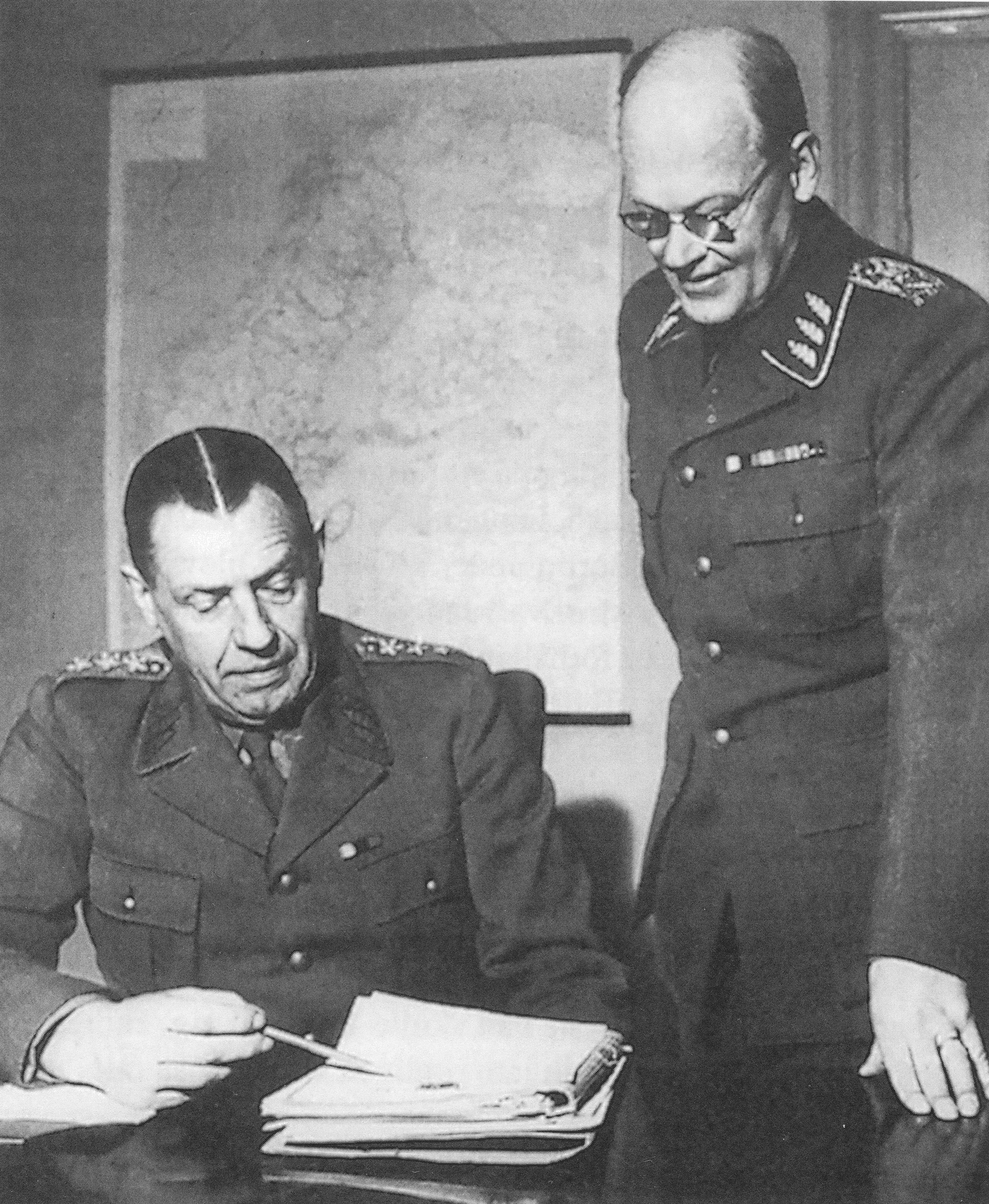
General Nils Swedlund (left) and Chief of Staff Richard Åkerman (right), 1 April 1951.

=== Swedish Army/Air Force ===
- 1919 – Second lieutenant
- 1923 – Lieutenant
- 1931 – Captain
- 1939 – Major
- 1941 – Lieutenant colonel
- 1943 – Colonel
- 1948 – Colonel (Swedish Air Force)
- 1951 – Major general
- 1963 – Lieutenant general

=== Finnish Army ===
- 1939 – Major
- 1940 – Lieutenant Colonel

== Awards and decorations ==
=== Swedish ===
- (Sweden) Commander Grand Cross of the Order of the Sword (6 June 1958)
- (Sweden) Knight of the Order of the Polar Star
- (Sweden) Knight of the Order of Vasa
- (Sweden) National Air Protection Federation Medal of Merit
- (Sweden) National Air Protection Federation Merit Badge in gold
- (Sweden) Home Guard Medal of Merit in gold (6 June 1959)
- (Sweden) Landstorm Gold Medal (Landstorm-guldmedalj)

=== Foreign ===
- (Denmark) Commander 1st Class of the Order of the Dannebrog
- Commander 1st Class of the Order of the White Rose of Finland
- (Norway) Commander with Star of the Order of St. Olav (1 July 1955)
- (France) Commander of the Legion of Honour
- (Finland) Order of the Cross of Liberty, 3rd Class with swords
- (Finland) Finnish War Commemorative Medal

Military offices
Preceded by Carl August Ehrensvärd	Royal Swedish Army Staff College; 1942–1946	Succeeded by Hilding Kring
Preceded by Ragnar Lindblad	Östgöta Anti-Aircraft Regiment; 1946–1948	Succeeded by Sten Axel Odelberg
Preceded by None	Inspector of the Control and Reporting System; 1948–1951	Succeeded by Birger Schyberg
Preceded by Nils Swedlund	Chief of the Defence Staff; 1951–1957	Succeeded by Curt Göransson
Preceded by Thord Bonde	III Military District; 1957–1963	Succeeded by Fale Burman
