= Thord Bonde =

Swedish count and general (1900–1969)

Count Thord Bonde
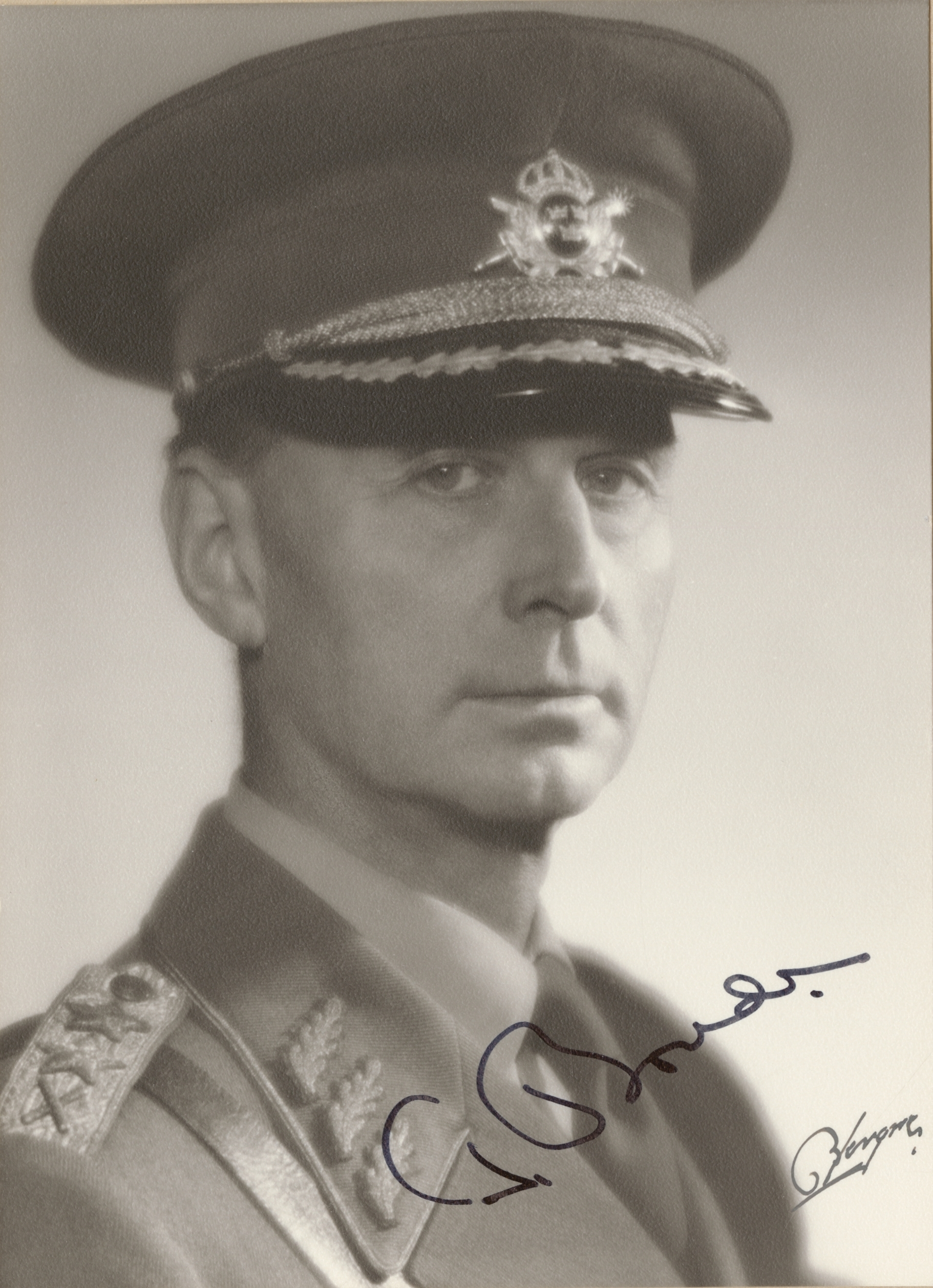
- Bonde as lieutenant general (1957–1963).
- Born: Thord C:son Bonde; 17 March 1900; Stockholm, Sweden
- Died: 18 October 1969 (aged 69); Danderyd, Sweden
- Relatives: Carl Bonde (father); Carl C:son Bonde (brother)
- Military career
- Allegiance: Sweden
- Branch: Swedish Army
- Service years: 1920–1963
- Rank: General
- Commands: Section 1, Defence Staff; Vice Chief of the Defence Staff; UNTSO; Svea Life Guards; National Defence College; VII Military District; III Military District; Chief of the Army
- Conflicts: Arab–Israeli conflict
- Other work: Chief of His Majesty's Military Staff

General Count Thord C:son (Carlsson) Bonde af Björnö (17 March 1900 – 18 October 1969) was a Swedish Army officer. His senior commands include military commander of the VII Military District in 1955, commander of the III Military District from 1955 to 1957 and Chief of the Army from 1957 to 1963.

== Early life ==
Bonde was born on 17 March 1900 in Stockholm, Sweden, the son of Crown Equerry, Count Carl Bonde and his first wife Blanche (née Dickson). He was brother of Carl C:son Bonde and half-brother of financier and cabinet chamberlain Peder Bonde.

== Career ==
Bonde became second lieutenant in the Life Regiment Hussars (K 3) in 1920 and captain of the General Staff in 1932. He was promoted to major in 1941, lieutenant colonel in 1943 and served as military attaché in Washington, D.C. from 1943 to 1945. In March 1946, Bonde was appointed colonel in the General Staff Corps with appointment as colonel in the Defence Staff, head of Section 1 and Vice Chief of the Defence Staff. In March 1947, Bonde was appointed by the Minister of Defense as an adviser in the Defence Committee from 1 April. Bonde served as Chief of Staff of United Nations Truce Supervision Organization (UNTSO) from May 1948 to July 1948 when Åge Lundström succeeded him. On 6 July 1948, Bonde was subjected to Arab firing as he intervened in a battle that occurred near the Arab village of Jaba' south of Haifa en route to Tel Aviv. Bonde was rescued from the situation by a UN jeep. Bonde returned to Sweden from Damascus on 13 July.

Back in Sweden, Bonde continued serving as head of Section 1 in the Defence Staff until February 1950 when he was appointed second-in-command of the Svea Life Guards (I 1). He took command of the regiment on 1 October 1950. He then served as head of the Swedish National Defence College from 1953 to 1955. Bonde was promoted to major general in 1954. Bonde was the military commander of the VII Military District in 1955 and the III Military District from 1955 to 1957 when he was promoted to lieutenant general. He was Chief of the Army from 1957 to 1963 and was appointed general upon his retirement in 1963.

Bonde was chief of His Majesty's Military Staff from 1963 to 1969 and chairman of the Directorate of the Swedish Nobility Foundation from 1965.

== Personal life ==
In 1926, Bonde married Anna-Greta Sjöberg (1900–1983), the daughter of the state agricultural engineer A. L. G. Sjöberg and his wife. He was the father of Birgitta (born 1927), Margaretha (born 1931) and Claes (born 1941).

== Dates of rank ==
- 1920 – Second lieutenant
- 19?? – Lieutenant
- 1932 – Captain
- 1941 – Major
- 1943 – Lieutenant colonel
- 1946 – Colonel
- 1954 – Major general
- 1957 – Lieutenant general
- 1963 – General

== Awards and decorations ==
=== Swedish ===
- (Sweden) Commander Grand Cross of the Order of the Sword (6 June 1959)
- (Sweden) Commander of the Order of Vasa
- (Sweden) Knight of the Order of the Polar Star

=== Foreign ===
- Commander Grand Cross of the Order of the Lion of Finland
- (Norway) Grand Cross of the Order of St. Olav (1 July 1960)
- (Italy) 1st Class / Knight Grand Cross of the Order of Merit of the Italian Republic (15 July 1968)
- (United States) Commander of the Legion of Merit (4 December 1959)
- (United States) Officer of the Legion of Merit (1946)
- Grand Decoration of Honour in Gold with Star for Services to the Republic of Austria (1960)

== Honours ==
- Member of Royal Swedish Academy of War Sciences (1945)

Military offices
Preceded by Nils Swedlund	Vice Chief of the Defence Staff; 1946–1950	Succeeded by Moje Östberg
Preceded by Nils Swedlund	Section 1 of the Defence Staff; 1946–1950	Succeeded by ?
New title	Chief of Staff, United Nations Truce Supervision Organization; 1946–1948	Succeeded by Åge Lundström
Preceded by Gösta von Stedingk	Svea Life Guards; 1950–1953	Succeeded by Malcolm Murray
Preceded by Richard Åkerman	Swedish National Defence College; 1953–1955	Succeeded by Ivar Backlund
Preceded by Ivar Backlund	IV Military District; 1955–1955	Succeeded by Hilding Kring
Preceded by Sven Colliander	III Military District; 1955–1957	Succeeded by Richard Åkerman
Preceded by Carl August Ehrensvärd	Chief of the Army; 1957–1963	Succeeded by Curt Göransson
Court offices
Preceded by Hugo Cederschiöld	Chief of His Majesty's Military Staff; 1963–1969	Succeeded by Gustav Åkerman
Professional and academic associations
Preceded by Carl Hamilton	Chairman of the Directorate of the Swedish Nobility Foundation; 1965–1969	Succeeded by Sten Ankarcrona
