= Carl August Ehrensvärd (1892–1974) =

Swedish Army officer

Count Carl August Ehrensvärd
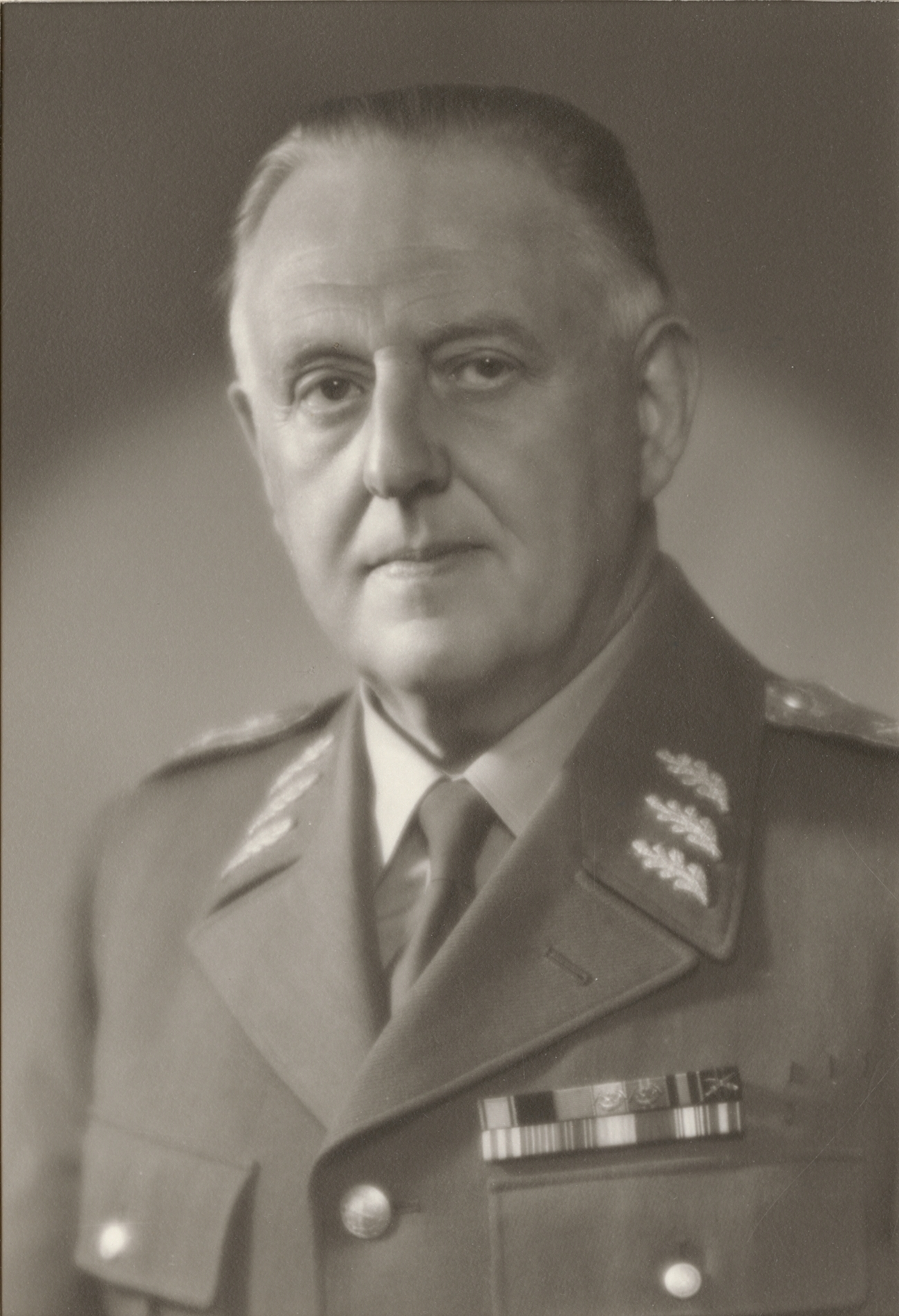
- Ehrensvärd in 1957
- Born: 3 August 1892; Karlskrona, Sweden
- Died: 24 April 1974 (aged 81); Ystad, Sweden
- Burial place: Tosterup cemetery
- Relatives: Carl August Ehrensvärd (father); Albert Ehrensvärd (uncle); Gösta Ehrensvärd (brother); Augustin Ehrensvärd (brother); Augustin Ehrensvärd (great-grandfather); Archibald Douglas (cousin)
- Military career
- Allegiance: Sweden; Finland
- Branch: Swedish Army (1913–1939, 1940–1957); Finnish Army (1918, 1939–1940)
- Service years: 1913–1957
- Rank: General
- Nickname: Cala
- Commands: Army Operations Department, Defence Staff; Army Staff College; South Scanian Infantry Regiment; Chief of the Defence Staff; I Military District; Chief of the Army
- Conflicts: Finnish Civil War; Korpogård; Lohm; Loimaa; World War II; Winter War

General Count Carl August Ehrensvärd (3 August 1892 – 24 April 1974) was a Swedish Army officer. Ehrensvärd came from a distinguished family with a military background. His father was Admiral Count Carl August Ehrensvärd, Swedish Minister for Naval Affairs, and his great-grandfather was the renowned fortress builder Augustin Ehrensvärd.

Ehrensvärd's career in the military began in 1911 when he became an officer volunteer in the Svea Life Guards. He served in various capacities in both the Swedish and Finnish armies, participating in the Invasion of Åland in 1918 and commanding the Archipelago Free Corps. He rose through the ranks, achieving the rank of major in the Finnish Army in 1918. Returning to the Swedish Army, Ehrensvärd attended the Royal Swedish Army Staff College and the General Staff Academy, eventually serving in staff and teaching roles. His career included significant positions such as head of the Central Department of the General Staff and Chief of the Defence Staff from 1945 to 1947.

Ehrensvärd faced challenges within the military hierarchy, notably the "Meyerhöffer affair" in 1947, where a proposal to appoint a pro-German officer led to opposition. Despite these challenges, Ehrensvärd became Chief of the Army in 1948. He was intended to be the Supreme Commander but was rejected on the grounds that he was better suited for war than peace. He remained Chief of the Army until 1957 when he was promoted to full general and transferred to the reserve.

== Early life and family ==
Ehrensvärd was born on 3 August 1892 in Karlskrona, Sweden, the son of Admiral, Count Carl August Ehrensvärd (1858–1944) and Baroness Lovisa Ulrika (Ulla), née Thott. He was the brother of Vice Admiral Gösta Ehrensvärd (1885–1973) and Deputy Director of the Ministry of Defence Augustin Ehrensvärd (1887–1968). He was the uncle of chemist Gösta Ehrensvärd (1910–1980). His great-grandfather was the fortress builder Augustin Ehrensvärd, his uncle was Albert Ehrensvärd and his cousin was Archibald Douglas, Ehrensvärd's predecessor on the Chief of the Army post. He passed studentexamen on 15 May 1911.

== Career ==
Ehrensvärd became an officers volunteer in the Svea Life Guards (I 1) on 24 May 1911. He became the Queen's Page of Honour in 25 August 1912 and a cadet at the Royal Military Academy on 25 October the same year. Ehrensvärd became a second lieutenant in the Svea Life Guards (I 1) in 1913 and became lieutenant there in 1915. He took part in the Invasion of Åland as adjutant of the commanding officer of Åland Detachment in 1918 and resigned from the Swedish Army the same year and joined the Finnish Army where he commanded the Archipelago Free Corps (Skärgårdens frikår) and took part in battles in Åboland archipelago and southwestern Finland (Korpogård 28 March, Lohm 4 April and Loimaa 22 April).

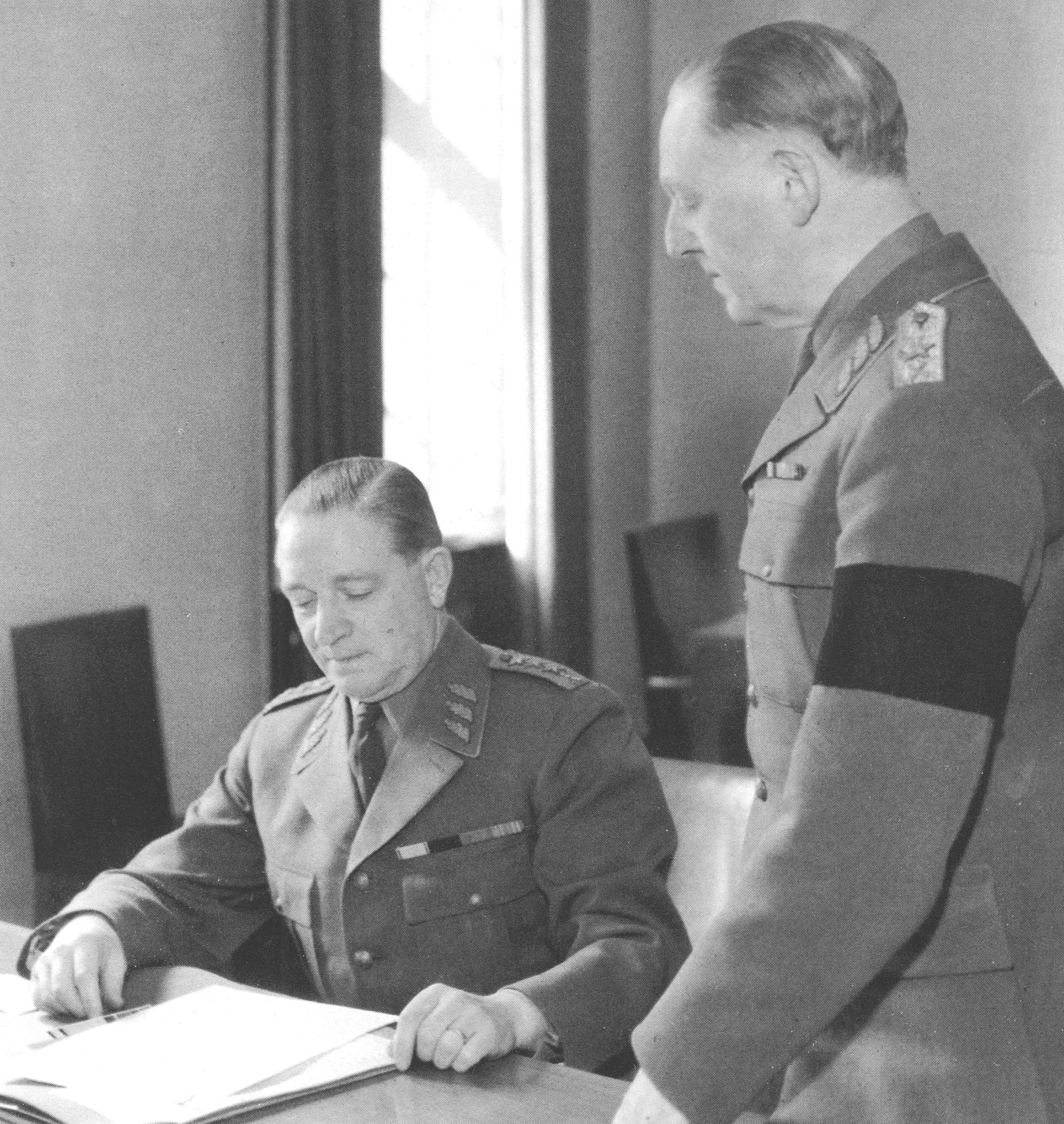
Supreme Commander of the Swedish Armed Forces Helge Jung (left) and Carl August Ehrensvärd.

He was promoted to major in the Finnish Army in May 1918 and was then reinstated in the Swedish Army as lieutenant in the Svea Life Guards (I 1) in September the same year. Ehrensvärd then attended the Royal Swedish Army Staff College from 1920 to 1922 and was a cadet of the General Staff from 1923 to 1925. He was staff adjutant and was promoted to captain of the General Staff in 1926 and served in the Svea Life Guards (I 1) in 1927 and was a teacher at the Royal Swedish Army Staff College from 1928 to 1934. Ehrensvärd was captain in the Svea Life Guards (I 1) in 1931 and staff adjutant and captain of the General Staff in 1932. He was major and chief adjutant of the General Staff in 1934 and in 1935. He was head of the Central Department of the General Staff from 1935 to 1937 and the Army Operations Department in the Defence Staff from 1937 to 1938.

Ehrensvärd was major and chief adjutant in the General Staff Corps from April to July 1937 and was in October of that year promoted to lieutenant colonel and chief adjutant in the General Staff Corps. He was lieutenant colonel and commanding officer of the tank battalion at Göta Life Guards (I 2) from 1938 to 1939 and the tank battalion at Skaraborg Regiment (I 9) in 1939. Ehrensvärd was lieutenant colonel and Chief of Staff of the Swedish Volunteer Corps during the Winter War in Finland in 1940. There he took part in operations in Lapland during 1940. Ehrensvärd was promoted to colonel in the Finnish Army in 1940 and colonel in the Swedish Army the same year. He was head of the Royal Swedish Army Staff College from 1940 to 1941 and commanding officer of South Scanian Infantry Regiment (I 7) from 1941 to 1942. Ehrensvärd was section chief in the Defence Staff from 1942 to 1944 and was promoted to major general and appointed acting Chief of the Defence Staff in 1944. He was Chief of Defence Staff from 1945 to 1947. Ehrensvärd had the military responsibility for the Swedish stay-behind operation which was organised starting from 1946. He served as military commander of the I Military District from 1947 to 1948. Ehrensvärd was promoted to lieutenant general and was appointed Chief of the Army in 1948.

The year before, in 1947, a proposal to appoint pro-German Colonel Alf Meyerhöffer as army infantry inspector led to the so-called "Meyerhöffer affair" when the proposal met with great opposition from the Social Democratic government. A compromise made Meyerhöffer acting infantry inspector in 1947. Following threats of resignation from Ehrensvärd's cousin and Chief of the Army, Lieutenant General Archibald Douglas, Meyerhöffer was finally appointed cavalry and infantry inspector in 1949. The far more Western-friendly Ehrensvärd had been appointed Chief of the Army in 1948 which led Meyerhöffer into conflict with his new commanding officer and he therefore lodged his resignation in 1951. Ehrensvärd was intended to have become Supreme Commander but was rejected by Allan Vougt on the grounds that Ehrensvärd was better suited for war than peace.

In 1956, Ehrensvärd appointed Major Sigmund Ahnfelt as UN battalion commander in Gaza. The government opposed the nomination because of Ahnfeldt's previous involvement in the Lindholm movement. Ahnfeldt had been Sven Olov Lindholm's closest man for six years and had at the age of 27 candidated for the National League of Sweden after Meyerhöffer at the municipal elections in Östersund. Ehrensvärd threatened to resign unless he got his way, according to prime minister Tage Erlander. Ahnfeldt was persuaded by defence minister Torsten Nilsson to resign from the post. Ehrensvärd was Chief of the Army until 1957 when he was promoted to full general and transferred to the reserve.

In the early 1960s, the secret documents from Operation Stella Polaris in 1944, were brought from Hörningsholm Castle and Rottneros Manor and burnt on the instruction of the then Director-General of the National Defence Radio Establishment, Gustaf Tham, and the now retired General Ehrensvärd.

== Personal life ==
Ehrensvärd married the first time on 24 July 1922 in Lützow, in Mecklenburg-Schwerin, Germany to Countess Gisela Dorothée Anna-Luise Marianne Lilla von Bassewitz (20 December 1895 – 1946), the daughter of Count Adolf Carl Otto Alexander von Bassewitz-Behr and Dorothée Louise Helene Wanda Ebba Krell. He married a second time on 8 November 1947 in Malmö, Sweden with Svea Elisabeth Lachmann, née Olsson (born 15 June 1905), the daughter of carpenter Ola Olsson and Hanna Jönsson. Ehrensvärd was the father of Louise (1925–2014) and Jörgen Ehrensvärd (1932–2024).

Ehrensvärd owned parts of Tosterup Castle. He and his wife lived at Charlottenlund Castle.

== Death ==
Ehrensvärd died on 24 April 1974 in Ystad and was buried at Tosterup cemetery.

== Dates of rank ==
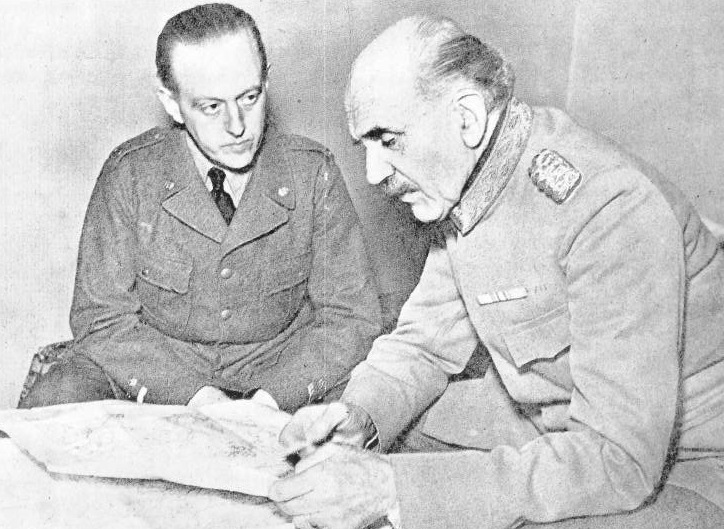
Commanding officer of the Swedish Volunteer Corps General Ernst Linder (right) and Carl August Ehrensvärd in Tornio.

=== Swedish Army ===
- 31 December 1913 – Underlöjtnant
- 22 December 1916 – Lieutenant
- 18 June 1926 – Captain
- 1934 – Major
- 1937 – Lieutenant colonel
- 1940 – Colonel
- 1944 – Major general
- 1948 – Lieutenant general
- 1957 – General

=== Finnish Army ===
- 13 May 1918 – Major
- 1940 – Colonel

== Awards and decorations ==
=== Swedish ===
- (Sweden) Commander Grand Cross of the Order of the Sword (15 November 1948)
- (Sweden) Commander 1st Class of the Order of the Sword (6 June 1944)
- (Sweden) Knight of the Order of the Sword (6 June 1934)
- (Sweden) Commander 1st Class of the Order of the Polar Star (6 June 1947)
- (Sweden) Commander of the Order of the Polar Star (6 June 1939)
- (Sweden) Knight of the Order of the Polar Star (15 November 1938)
- (Sweden) Knight of the Order of Vasa (16 June 1933)
- (Sweden) Home Guard Medal of Merit in Gold (6 June 1950)
- (Sweden) Swedish Central Federation for Voluntary Military Training Medal of Merit in gold
- (Sweden) Swedish Women's Voluntary Defence Organization Royal Medal of Merit in gold
- (Sweden) Swedish Civil Protection Association Medal of Merit in gold
- (Sweden) Healthcare Gold Medal (Sjukvårdsguldmedalj) (Swedish Red Cross)
- (Sweden) Central Board of the National Swedish Rifle Association's silver medal (Sveriges skytteförbunds överstyrelses silvermedalj)
- (Sweden) Equestrian Olympic Medal (Ryttarolympisk förtjänstmedalj)

=== Foreign ===
- (Denmark) Grand Commander of the Order of the Dannebrog
- (Ethiopian Empire) Grand Cross of the Order of the Star of Ethiopia
- Grand Cross of the Order of the White Rose of Finland
- (Norway) Grand Cross of the Order of St. Olav (1 July 1956)
- (France) Grand Officer of the Legion of Honour
- (Finland) Order of the Cross of Liberty, 2nd Class
- (Finland) Order of the Cross of Liberty, 4th Class with swords (16 May 1918)
- (Latvia) Officer of the Order of the Three Stars
- (Netherlands) Officer of the Order of Orange-Nassau with swords
- (Finland) Finnish commemorative medal Pro benignitate humana
- (Denmark) Danish Medal of Freedom (Dansk frihetsmedalj)
- (Finland) 2 x Finnish War Memorial Medal (Finsk krigsminnesmedalj)

== Honours ==
- Member of the Royal Swedish Academy of War Sciences (1935)

== Bibliography ==
- Ehrensvärd, Carl August (1935). Svenska försvarsprinciper: slagord och verklighet rörande grunderna för riksförsvarets ordnande : synpunkter framlagda vid föredrag i Stockholm den 4 december 1935 (in Swedish). Stockholm: Fören. K. H. S. SELIBR 1353388.
- Ehrensvärd, Carl August (1943). Hårt mot hårt: blixtanfall och blixtförsvar (in Swedish). Stockholm: Norstedt. SELIBR 1877989.
- Ehrensvärd, Carl August (1957). Vett och vilja: studie över svenska försvarsprinciper (in Swedish). Stockholm: Hörsta förl. SELIBR 323922.
- Ehrensvärd, Carl August (1965). I rikets tjänst: händelser och människor från min bana (in Swedish). Stockholm: Norstedt. SELIBR 8390023.
- Ehrensvärd, Carl August; Norberg, Erik (1991). Dagboksanteckningar 1938-1957. Handlingar / Kungl. Samfundet för utgivande av handskrifter rörande Skandinaviens historia, 0347-8505; 16 (in Swedish). Stockholm: Samf. för utg. av handskrifter rörande Skandinaviens historia. ISBN 91-85104-19-1. SELIBR 7745560.

Military offices
Preceded by None	Defence Staff's Army Operations Department; 1937–1938	Succeeded by Nils Björk
Preceded by Samuel Åkerhielm	Royal Swedish Army Staff College; 1940–1941	Succeeded by Viking Tamm
Preceded by Einar Björk	South Scanian Infantry Regiment; 1941–1942	Succeeded by Viking Tamm
Preceded by Axel Bredberg	Chief of the Defence Staff; 1945–1947	Succeeded by Nils Swedlund
Preceded by Ernst af Klercker	I Military District; 1947–1948	Succeeded by Samuel Åkerhielm
Preceded by Archibald Douglas	Chief of the Army; 1948–1957	Succeeded by Thord Bonde
