= Lars-Bertil Persson =

Swedish Air Force officer

- Born: Lars-Bertil Persson; 19 November 1934 (age 91); Lund, Sweden
- Military career
- Allegiance: Sweden
- Branch: Swedish Air Force
- Service years: 1956–1986
- Rank: Major General
- Commands: Norrbotten Wing; Deputy Chief of the Defence Staff
- Other work: GD of National Aeronautical Research Institute

Major General Lars-Bertil Persson (born 19 November 1934) is a retired Swedish Air Force officer. He served as wing commander of the Norrbotten Wing (F 21), as Deputy Chief of the Defence Staff, and as Director General of the National Aeronautical Research Institute.

== Early life ==
Persson was born on 19 November 1934 in Lund City Parish, Malmöhus County, Sweden, the son of Ernfrid Persson and his wife Lilly (née Fransson).

== Career ==
Persson was commissioned as an officer in the Swedish Air Force in 1956 and attended the Empire Test Pilots' School in England in 1959. He then served as a test pilot at the Swedish Center for Experimental Research (Försökscentralen, FC) at Malmen Airbase in Malmslätt from 1960 to 1968 and as a staff officer in the Defence Staff from 1968 to 1972. Persson was head of the Planning Department in the Defence Staff from 1973 to 1977 when he was promoted to colonel and appointed section chief in the Defence Staff. In 1980, Persson was promoted to senior colonel and was appointed wing commander of the Norrbotten Wing (F 21). On 1 October 1982, he was promoted to major general and was appointed head of the Planning Staff in the Defence Staff. Persson also served as Deputy Chief of the Defence Staff from 1982.

Persson was then director general and head of the National Aeronautical Research Institute from 1986 to 1996, and chairman of the Group for Aeronautical Research and Technology in Europe (GARTEUR) from 1996. He was also chairman of the Swedish Cruising Association (Svenska kryssarklubben) from 1983.

== Personal life ==
In 1960, he married Eiwor Haglund (born 1936), the daughter of Eric Haglund and Astrid (née Carlsson).

== Dates of rank ==
- 1956 – Second lieutenant
- 1958 – Lieutenant
- 1964 – Captain
- 1969 – Major
- 1972 – Lieutenant colonel
- 1977 – Colonel
- 1980 – Senior colonel
- 1982 – Major general

== Honours ==
- Member of the Royal Swedish Academy of War Sciences (1980)

Military offices
Preceded by Hans Hansson	Norrbotten Wing; 1980–1982	Succeeded by Bert Stenfeldt
Preceded by Bengt Lehander as Vice Chief	Deputy Chief of the Defence Staff; 1982–1986	Succeeded by Owe Wiktorin
Government offices
Preceded by Sven-Olof Olin	Director General of the National Aeronautical Research Institute; 1986–1996	Succeeded by Hans Dellner
