= Gösta Ehrensvärd (chemist) =

Swedish chemist (1910–1980)

Gösta Carl Henrik Ehrensvärd
- Born: Gösta Carl Henrik Ehrensvärd; 10 January 1910; Stockholm, Sweden
- Died: 13 July 1980 (aged 70)
- Education: Stockholm University College
- Scientific career
- Fields: Chemistry, Biochemistry
- Workplaces: Lund University

Count Gösta Carl Henrik Ehrensvärd (10 January 1910 – 13 July 1980) was a Swedish chemist.

Ehrensvärd graduated with a Ph.D. in physiological chemistry from Stockholm University College in 1942, and was simultaneously awarded the title as Docent. He became Docent in biochemistry at Karolinska Institute in 1948, Docent in medicinal chemistry and biochemistry in 1949-1950, and Docent in biochemistry at Stockholm University College in 1950. He was Laborator between 1952 and 1956, and was appointed Professor of biochemistry at Lund University in 1956. He was elected to the Royal Physiographic Society in Lund in 1956, and to the Royal Swedish Academy of Engineering Sciences in 1964.

== Family ==
Gösta Ehrensvärd was son of vice admiral, count Gösta Ehrensvärd and Anna Ehrensvärd, née Enell. In 1934, he married Ingalill Rydh, and in 1957 to Ursula Breithaupt.

== Sources ==
Vem är det : Svensk biografisk handbok 1963, Ed. Ingeborg Burling, P. A. Norstedt & Söners Förlag, Stockholm, 1962, p. 251.
