= Olof Thörnell =

Swedish Army officer (1877–1977)

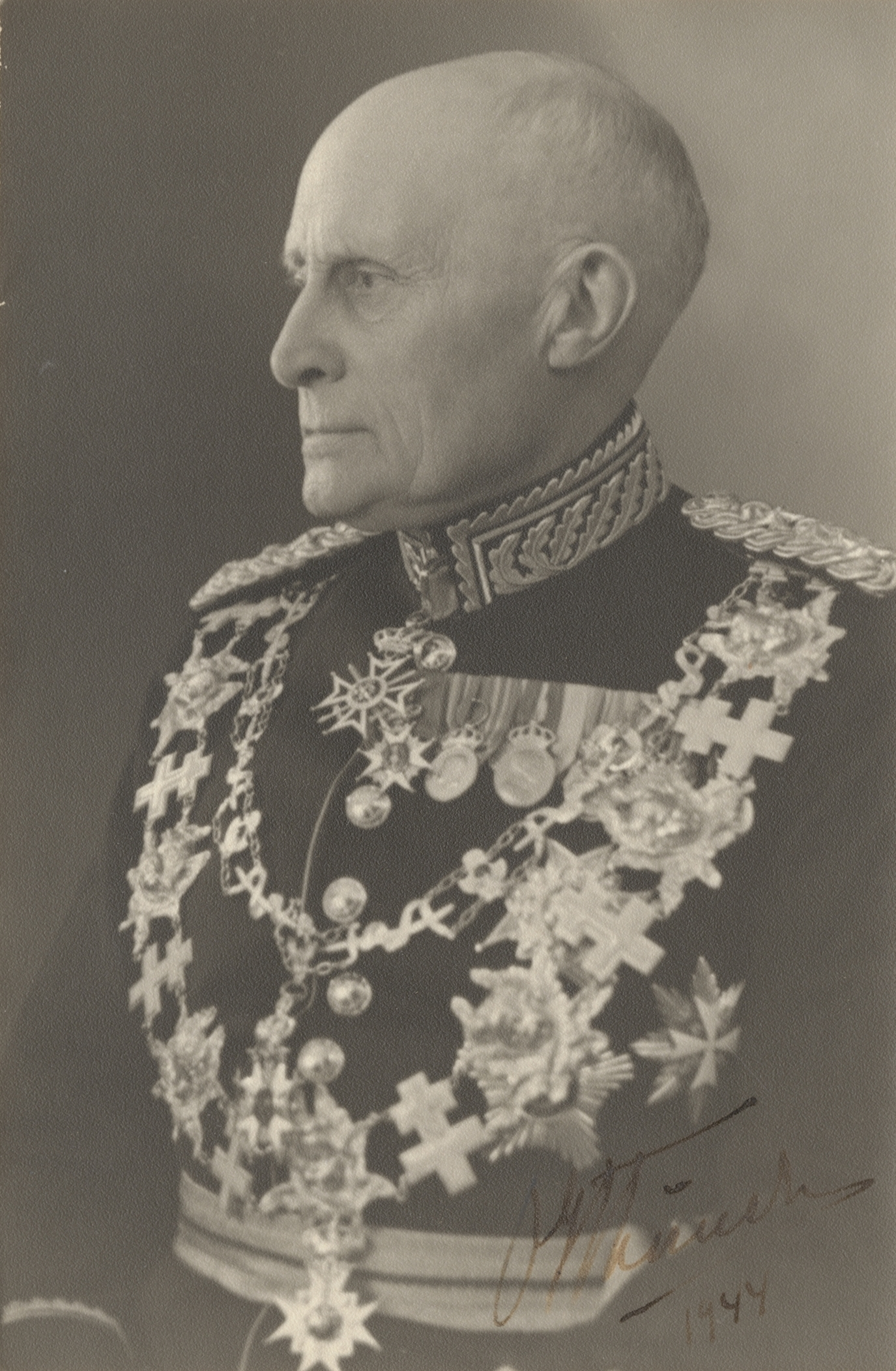
- General Thörnell in 1944.
- Born: Olof Gerhard Thörnell; 19 October 1877; Trönö, Sweden
- Died: 25 July 1977 (aged 99); Uppsala, Sweden
- Burial place: Uppsala Old Cemetery
- Military career
- Allegiance: Sweden
- Branch: Swedish Army
- Service years: 1897–1950
- Rank: General
- Nickname: "LM" (Note: Short for Lustmördaren, "The lust murderer".)
- Commands: Vaxholm Grenadier Regiment; Gotland Infantry Regiment; Army Service Troops; Inspector of the Infantry; Chief of the Defence Staff; Supreme Commander
- Other work: Chief of His Majesty's Military Staff

General Olof Gerhard Thörnell (19 October 1877 – 25 July 1977) was a senior Swedish Army officer. Thörnell's military career spanned several promotions and roles within the Swedish Army. He began as a lieutenant in the Uppland Regiment in 1900, later graduating from the Royal Swedish Army Staff College in 1906 and rising to the rank of captain. After teaching at the Army Staff College, he served as a captain in the Älvsborg Regiment. He then returned to the General Staff, quickly climbing the ranks to become a major and later a lieutenant colonel.

In 1918, he assumed a key position as head of the Central Department of the General Staff. Over the years, he held various commands in different regiments and was eventually appointed Chief of the Defence Staff in 1936. Despite being viewed as a rigid bureaucrat by some, he proved loyal to the government and took a cautious approach to Sweden's neutrality during World War II.

However, Thörnell's pro-German stance and the receipt of the Grand Cross of the Order of the German Eagle in 1940 led to criticism. He served as Supreme Commander of the Swedish Armed Forces until 1944, when he was succeeded by General Helge Jung. Thörnell continued to play a role in the military until 1950 when he served as chief of His Majesty's Military Staff until the death of King Gustaf V.

== Early life ==
Thörnell was born on 19 October 1877 in Trönö Parish, Söderhamn Municipality, Sweden, the son of Per Thörnell, a vicar, and his wife Gerhardina "Dine" Margareta (née Lindgren). He was the brother of professor Gösta Thörnell. He was born in the same room as Nathan Söderblom. Thörnell grew up in a priest's home with close contact with the academic world. After passing studentexamen on 17 May 1895 at Norra Latin in Stockholm he was commissioned as an officer in the Uppland Regiment (I 8) in 1897. The choice of regiment gave him time to lay the groundwork for solid language knowledge at the Uppsala University during vacant periods, including in Russian. In future commissions to foreign units in Austria, France and the Netherlands, he had additional opportunities to improve his language skills alongside the professional studies.

== Career ==
Thörnell was promoted to lieutenant on 7 December 1900 in Uppland Regiment (I 8). On 7 July 1906, Thörnell graduated from the Royal Swedish Army Staff College and was commissioned as an officer cadet at the General Staff. He was promoted to captain of the General Staff on 10 June 1910. From 1911 to 1915 Thörnell was a teacher at the Royal Swedish Army Staff College. In 1915 he left the General Staff and served as captain in the Älvsborg Regiment (I 15). After a few years in the field, he returned to the General Staff, where he quickly rose through the ranks. On 27 November 1917, he was promoted to major and on 19 August lieutenant colonel.

He was promoted to major of the General Staff in 1917, and became head of the Central Department of the General Staff in 1918. In 1921 he was promoted to lieutenant colonel in the General Staff. Thörnell was after that serving in the Upplands Infantry Regiment (I 8) in 1924 and was promoted to lieutenant colonel and acting commanding officer of Gotland Infantry Regiment (I 27) in 1926. On 24 August 1926 Thörnell was promoted to colonel and became commanding officer of Vaxholm Grenadier Regiment (I 26). On 1 January 1928 he was appointed military commander of Gotland and commanding officer of Gotland Infantry Regiment (I 27) and in 1931 he was appointed Inspector of the Swedish Army Service Troops. On 28 December 1933 he was promoted to major general and was appointed Inspector of the Swedish Infantry. On 1 July 1936, Thörnell, was promoted to Lieutenant General and at the same time appointed Chief of the Defence Staff. He now began the organization work. On 1 July 1937, the new staff gathered and the Chief of the Defense Staff took command of the new staff. Thörnell had a harsh and sarcastic personality, and was commonly known as LM, short for Lustmördaren, "the lust murderer", among the younger officers in the Defence Staff. He was considered an aged, stiff and unimaginable bureaucrat. The circle around Helge Jung had no respect for Thörnell, they saw him as a "chair warmer", a temporary solution until someone from their own ranks had enough years of service to take over his post. But from the government's point of view, Thörnell had an advantage. He was a loyal bureaucrat.

On 8 December 1939, he was appointed Supreme Commander and on 1 January he was promoted to general. Thörnell's time as the Supreme Commander was marked by several major concessions to Germany and Thörnell himself was generally considered pro-German. Thörnell was criticized by Torgny Segerstedt among other, because he, on 7 October 1940, received the Grand Cross of the Order of the German Eagle by the hands of the Prince of Wied with a letter signed by Adolf Hitler. Thörnell was a skilled organizer who put high demands on his staff. He was also a politically cautious general, overcautious some thought, who took active part in the intricate game about the Swedish neutrality during the first dangerous war years. He tried to safeguard the country for as many possible chain of events as possible. Thörnell left office as Supreme Commander on 1 April 1944 and was succeeded by Helge Jung. Thörnell was chief of His Majesty's Military Staff until the king died on 29 October 1950.

== Duties ==
- Member of the 1918 Military Payroll Experts (1918 års militära avlöningssakkunniga) 1920-1921
- Member of the 1921 Pension Committee (1921 års pensionskommittée)
- Member of the Swedish Armed Forces Salaries and Wages Board (Försvarsväsendets lönenämnd) 1921-1924
- Vice Chancellor of the Orders of His Majesty the King (Kungl. Maj:ts Orden) in 1947

== Personal life ==
On 1 October 1904, he married Anna Henrika Halling (1883–1972) in Skållerud, the daughter of factory manager Alex Halling and Henrika Gustafva (née Collén). They had four children: Gerhard (1905–1940), Barbro (1908–1992), Ulla (1914–2011), and Per (1918–1990).

== Death ==
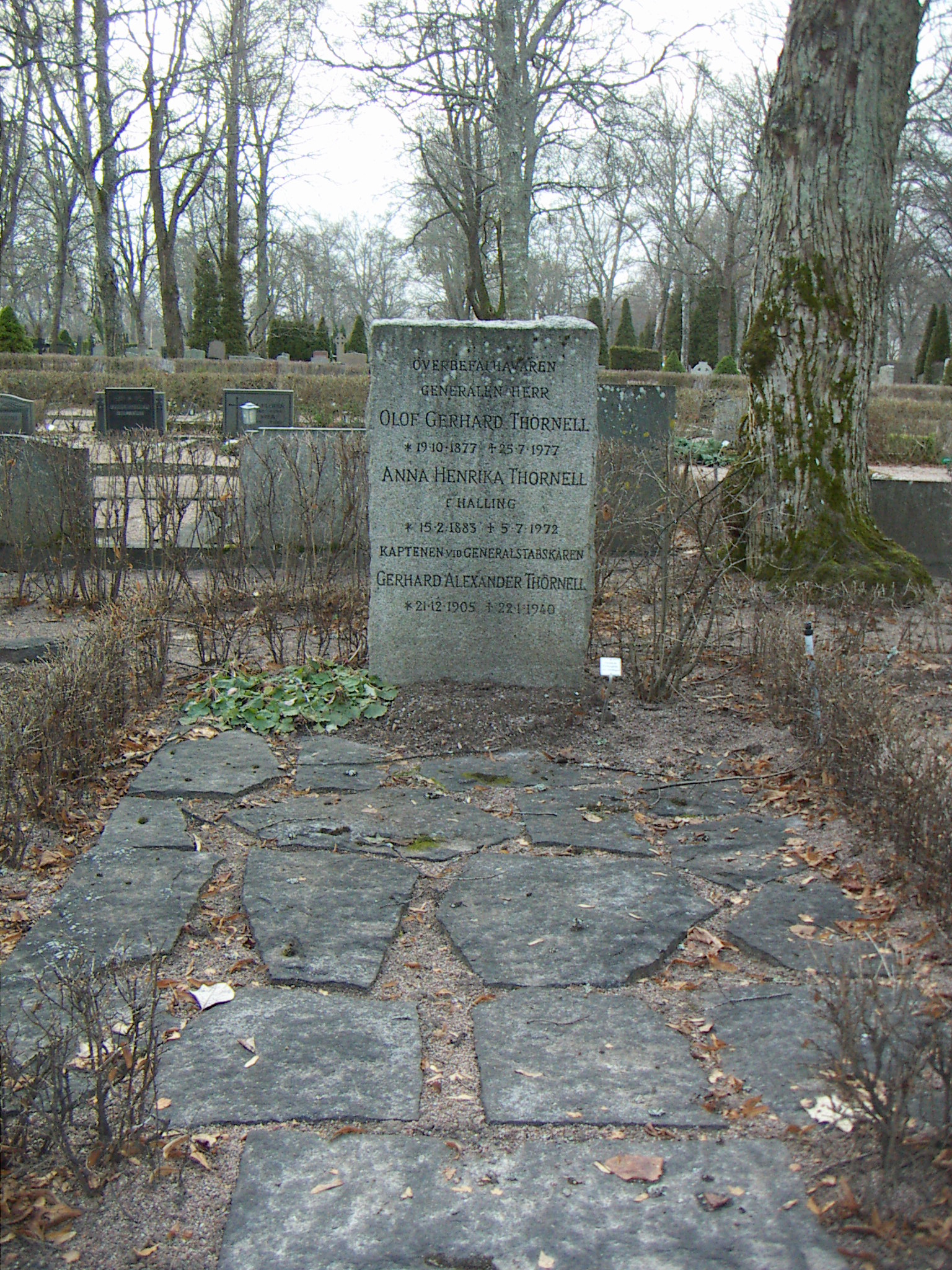
Olof Thörnell's grave in Uppsala Old Cemetery.

Thörnell died on 25 July 1977 in Uppsala and was buried in Uppsala Old Cemetery.

== Dates of rank ==
Promotions
Rank	Date
Underlöjtnant	1897
Lieutenant	1900
Captain	1910
Major	1917
Lieutenant Colonel	1921
Colonel	1926
Major General	1933
Lieutenant General	1 July 1936
General	1 January 1940

== Awards and decorations ==
=== Swedish ===
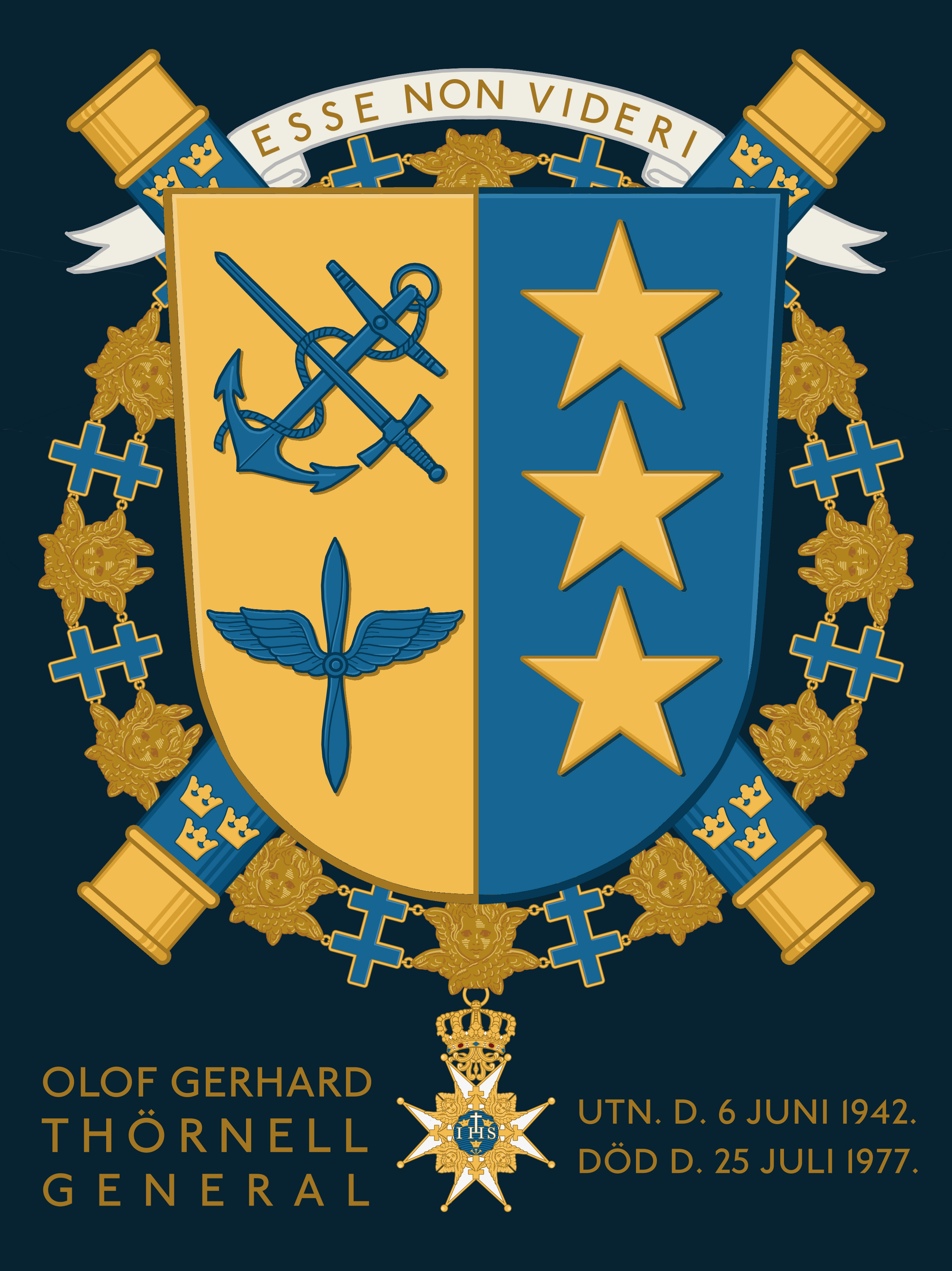
Escutcheon of Olof Thörnell showing the Order of the Seraphim.

- (Sweden) Knight and Commander of the Orders of His Majesty (6 June 1942)
- (Sweden) King Gustaf V's Jubilee Commemorative Medal (1948)
- (Sweden) King Gustaf V's Commemorative Medal (1951)
- (Sweden) King Gustaf VI Adolf's Commemorative Medal (1967)
- (Sweden) Commander Grand Cross of the Order of the Sword (5 June 1937)
- (Sweden) Commander First Class of the Order of the Sword (28 November 1929)
- (Sweden) Knight of the Order of the Sword (1918)
- (Sweden) Knight of the Order of Vasa (1945)
- (Sweden) National Air Protection Federation Medal of Merit in silver (1943)
- (Sweden) Swedish Voluntary Motor Transport Corps Merit Badge (1940)
- (Sweden) Medal of Merit for the Voluntary Motorboat Corps (Förtjänstmedalj för Frivilliga motorbåtskåren) 1929
- (Sweden) Landstorm Officer's Society Medal of Merit (Landstormsofficerssällskaps förtjänstmedalj) (1930)
- (Sweden) National Federation of Swedish Women’s Auxiliary Defence Services' Medal of Merit (Svenska lottakårens förtjänstmedalj) (1930)
- (Sweden) Swedish Landstorm Association Medal of Merit (Sveriges Landstormsförenings förtjänstmedalj) (1930)
- (Sweden) Gotland Shooting Association Medal of Merit (Gotlands skytteförbunds förtjänstmedalj) (1932)
- (Sweden) Swedish Red Star Medal of Merit (Svenska Röda Stjärnans förtjänstmedalj) (1938)

=== Foreign ===
- (Denmark) Grand Cross of the Order of the Dannebrog
- Grand Cross of the Order of the White Rose of Finland (26 October 1938)
- (Nazi Germany) Grand Cross of the Order of the German Eagle (1940)
- (Netherlands) Commander of the Order of Orange-Nassau with swords
- (Finland) Winter War Commemorative Medal for Foreigners

== Honours ==
- Member of the Royal Swedish Academy of War Sciences (1923)
- Honorary Member of the Royal Swedish Society of Naval Sciences (1939)

== Footnotes ==
Military offices
Preceded by Eric Virgin	Inspector of the Swedish Army Service Troops; 1931–1933	Succeeded by Axel Bredberg
Preceded by C A P A Sjögren	Inspector of the Swedish Infantry; 1933–1936	Succeeded by Martin Hanngren
Preceded by None	Chief of the Defence Staff; 1936–1939	Succeeded by Axel Rappe
Preceded by None	Supreme Commander; 1939–1944	Succeeded by Helge Jung
Court offices
Preceded by Carl August Ehrensvärd	Chief of His Majesty's Military Staff; 1944–1950	Succeeded by Hugo Cederschiöld
