= Owe Wiktorin =

Swedish Air Force officer (born 1940)

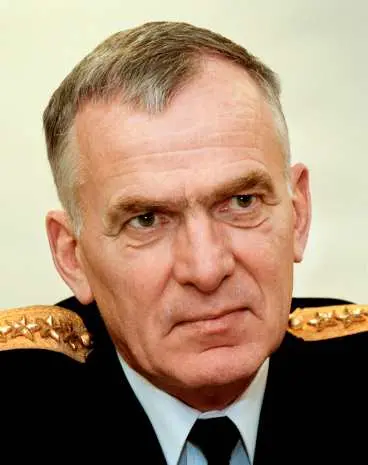
- Owe Wiktorin
- Born: Owe Erik Axel Wiktorin; 7 May 1940 (age 86); Motala, Sweden
- Military career
- Allegiance: Sweden
- Branch: Swedish Air Force
- Service years: 1964–2000
- Rank: General
- Commands: Deputy Chief of the Defence Staff; Chief of the Defence Staff; Southern Military District; Supreme Commander
- Awards: H. M. The King's Medal

General Owe Erik Axel Wiktorin (born 7 May 1940) is a retired Swedish Air Force officer. Wiktorin had a distinguished military career, culminating in his role as Supreme Commander of the Swedish Armed Forces during the late 1990s and early 2000s. His tenure faced significant challenges due to the changing global security landscape following the end of the Cold War. Wiktorin advocated for a more realistic defence posture in Sweden, recognizing the evolving nature of threats and the erosion of former Soviet military power. He pushed for the modernization of the Swedish Armed Forces to adapt to these changing circumstances.

Another major challenge was the restructuring of Sweden's defence organizations, resulting in a unified defence force. During this period, Wiktorin highlighted the limitations of European military capabilities and emphasized the need for Europe to develop a self-reliant defence strategy. Despite facing budget cuts and economic pressures, Wiktorin remained committed to advancing Sweden's defence capabilities. His leadership left a lasting impact on the country's defence policies and structures, shaping its response to evolving security challenges.

== Early life ==
Wiktorin was born on 7 May 1940 in Motala, Sweden, the son of Erik Wiktorin, a chief accountant, and his wife Esther (née Johnson). Wiktorin was dreaming of becoming a pilot at a young age and he built aircraft models during when growing up in Askersund. He passed his studentexamen in 1961. 191.5 centimeters tall, Wiktorin was almost too tall for the fighter's cockpits, but he was accepted and trained as a pilot at the Swedish Air Force Flying School in Ljungbyhed from 1961 to 1962 eventually becoming an officer in the Swedish Air Force in 1964.

== Career ==
=== Military career ===
Wiktorin served as an attack pilot at Skaraborg Wing (F 7) from 1964 to 1969 and attack squadron commander at Skaraborg Wing from 1969 to 1971. Wiktorin studied the higher course at the Swedish Armed Forces Staff College and served at the Planning Department at the Defence Staff from 1971 to 1973. He then studied at the Air Command and Staff College in the United States from 1979 to 1980. He was head of the Planning Department at the Defence Staff from 1980 to 1983 and was deputy wing commander at Jämtland Wing (F 4) from 1983 to 1984 and head of Section 1 of the Air Staff from 1 October 1984 to 1986. On 1 April 1986 he was promoted to major general and was appointed head of the Planning Management in the Defence Staff as well as Deputy Chief of the Defence Staff.

On 1 July 1991 he became lieutenant general and Chief of the Defence Staff and in 1992 he was appointed military commander of the Southern Military District (Milo S), taking command on 1 October. On 1 July 1994, he was promoted to general and became Supreme Commander of the Swedish Armed Forces.

=== Tenure as Supreme Commander ===
Owe Wiktorin's tenure as Supreme Commander during the late 1990s and early 2000s was marked by significant challenges and changes in Sweden's defence landscape. At the outset, the end of the Cold War had shifted the global security paradigm, and Sweden had to adapt to a new, more uncertain environment. The collapse of the Warsaw Pact and the Soviet Union brought both relief and concern. While the immediate threat from the East diminished, the unpredictability of potential future adversaries increased. One major issue during Wiktorin's leadership was the question of Sweden's defence posture. The Swedish government initially believed it could rapidly reclaim the country if faced with aggression, leading to significant cuts in defence capabilities. However, Wiktorin was skeptical of this strategy, recognizing the eroding state of former Soviet military power and the evolving nature of threats. He argued for a more realistic approach and urged for a modernization of the Swedish Armed Forces.

Another significant challenge was the restructuring of Sweden's defence organizations, which merged over a hundred different agencies into a unified defence force with a new budgeting system. This restructuring created the largest government agency in Sweden, with 40,000 employees and an additional 25,000 jobs in the defence industry. The transition was met with resistance and required extensive leadership and communication efforts to unite the various factions within the military. During this period, Sweden was also actively involved in international peacekeeping efforts, particularly in Bosnia and Herzegovina and Kosovo. Wiktorin highlighted the limitations of European military capabilities and the dependence on U.S. intervention in these conflicts. He stressed the need for Europe to develop a more self-reliant defence strategy to avoid over-reliance on American military support.

Wiktorin's push for defence modernization and his efforts to adapt to changing security realities faced numerous challenges, including further budget cuts and economic pressures. Despite these hurdles, he remained committed to his vision for a more networked and technologically advanced defence force. In retrospect, Wiktorin characterized his time as Supreme Commander as turbulent and challenging, with both positive and frustrating moments. He expressed disappointment with the lack of political responsibility in shaping defence policy and the decision-making process. His tenure lasted over six years, a period he deemed sufficient for leaders in such a demanding role, citing the need for fresh leadership and new perspectives within the organization. In conclusion, Wiktorin's time as Sweden's Supreme Commander was marked by significant changes in defence strategy and organization, as well as a shifting international security landscape. His leadership played a crucial role in shaping Sweden's response to these challenges, and he left a lasting impact on the country's defence policies and structures. Wiktorin retired on 30 June 2000.

== Later life ==
On 2 October 1998, Wiktorin became honorary member number 20 of the Lund Academic Officer Society (Lunds Akademiska Officerssällskap). On 6 June 2000 he was awarded the H. M. The King's Medal of the 12th size in gold with chain "for outstanding work for the Swedish defence." Wiktorin was chairman of the Swedish Association for Hunting and Wildlife Management (Svenska Jägareförbundet) from 2003 to 2007 and then became an honorary member.

== Personal life ==
In 1965, Wiktorin married in Cajs Gårding (born 1943), the daughter of engineer Folke Gårding and Signe (née Domeij). Together they have two sons, Martin and Björn.

== Dates of rank ==
- 1964 – Second lieutenant
- 19?? – Lieutenant
- 19?? – Captain
- 1975 – Major
- 19?? – Lieutenant colonel
- 1983 – Colonel
- 19?? – Senior colonel
- 1 April 1986 – Major general
- 1 July 1991 – Lieutenant general
- 1 July 1994 – General

== Awards and decorations ==
=== Swedish ===
- (Sweden) H. M. The King's Medal, 12th size gold medal worn around the neck on a chain of gold (2000)
- (Sweden) For Zealous and Devoted Service of the Realm
- (Sweden) Home Guard Medal of Merit
- (Sweden) Swedish Air Force Volunteers Association Medal of Merit
- (Sweden) Swedish Air Force Volunteers Association Merit Badge

=== Foreign ===
- (Denmark) Grand Cross of the Order of the Dannebrog
- Grand Cross of the Order of the White Rose of Finland
- (France) Commander of the Legion of Honour
- (Estonia) 2nd Class of the Order of the Cross of the Eagle (2 February 2001)

== Honours ==
- Member of the Royal Swedish Academy of War Sciences (1985)

== Bibliography ==
- Wiktorin, Owe (2000). Nya krav - nytt försvar [New requirements - new defense] (in Swedish). Stockholm: Försvarsmakten.
- Wiktorin, Owe (1999). Från pengapolitik till säkerhetspolitik: Centralförbundet Folk och försvars konferens Sälen 24/1 1999 [From monetary policy to security policy: Central Association of People and Defense's conference, Sälen 24 January 1999] (in Swedish). Stockholm: Försvarsmakten.
- Wiktorin, Owe (1998). En förändrad värld - ett förändrat försvar: Centralförbundet Folk och försvars konferens, Sälen 18/1 1998 [A changed world - a changed defense: Central Association of People and Defense's conference, Sälen 18 January 1998] (in Swedish). Stockholm: Försvarsmakten.

Military offices
Preceded by Lars-Bertil Persson	Deputy Chief of the Defence Staff; 1986–1991	Succeeded by None
Preceded by Torsten Engberg	Chief of the Defence Staff; 1991–1992	Succeeded by Peter Nordbeck
Preceded by Gustaf Welin	Southern Military District; 1992–1994	Succeeded by Sven-Åke Jansson
Preceded by Bengt Gustafsson	Supreme Commander; 1994–2000	Succeeded by Johan Hederstedt
