= Nils Swedlund =

Swedish Army officer (1898–1965)

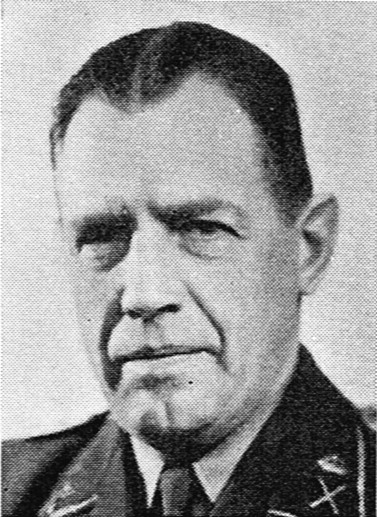
- Born: Nils Per Robert Swedlund; 16 May 1898; Gävle, Sweden
- Died: 28 June 1965 (aged 67); Mariehamn, Åland Islands
- Burial place: Skogsö cemetery, Saltsjöbaden
- Relatives: Sten Swedlund (nephew)
- Military career
- Allegiance: Sweden
- Branch: Swedish Army
- Service years: 1919–1961
- Rank: General
- Nickname: Stora Bullret ("Big Noise")
- Commands: Norrbotten Regiment; Army Department, Defence Staff; Vice Chief of the Defence Staff; Section 1, Defence Staff; Chief of the Defence Staff; Supreme Commander

General Nils Per Robert Swedlund (16 May 1898 – 28 June 1965) was a senior Swedish Army officer. Swedlund, commissioned as a second lieutenant in 1919, served in Hälsinge Regiment. He rose through the ranks, becoming a captain in the General Staff Corps in 1933 and later teaching at the Royal Swedish Army Staff College. Promoted to major in 1940 and lieutenant colonel in 1942, he held key roles in the Defence Staff.

During World War II, Swedlund trained Norwegian police troops and later commanded Norrbotten Regiment. He served as Chief of the Defence Staff from 1947 to 1951, achieving major general, lieutenant general, and general ranks in quick succession. As Supreme Commander of the Swedish Armed Forces from 1951 to 1961, he strongly advocated for Swedish nuclear weapons and played a role in forming a secret resistance movement in case of a Soviet invasion, known as the Stay-behind movement.

== Early life ==
Swedlund was born on 16 May 1898 in Gävle, Sweden, the son of major Gustav Swedlund and his wife Ellen (née Reuterskiöld) and brother of the archivist and historian Robert Swedlund. His nephew was the Chief of the Costal Fleet, Rear Admiral Sten Swedlund. Nils Swedlund passed studentexamen at the Högre allmänna läroverket in Gävle in 1917.

== Career ==
Swedlund was commissioned as an officer with the rank of second lieutenant in 1919 and was assigned to Hälsinge Regiment (I 14). Swedlund became captain in the General Staff Corps in 1933 and conducted rehearsals and was a teacher at the Royal Swedish Army Staff College from 1934 to 1938 and from 1940 to 1942. He was promoted to major in 1940 and lieutenant colonel in 1942. Swedlund was head of department at the Defence Staff in 1942 and was appointed vice chief and section chief in the Defense Staff in 1944. He was promoted to colonel the same year.

During World War II Swedlund was involved in the Swedish training of Norwegian police troops. Swedlund was then commanding officer of Norrbotten Regiment (I 19) from 1946 to 1947 and the Chief of the Defence Staff from 1947 to 1951. He was promoted to major general in 1948, lieutenant general in 1951 and finally general in 1951. Swedlund was the Supreme Commander from 1951 to 1961. As Supreme Commander Swedlund was a strong supporter of nuclear weapons and a driving force in continuing the Swedish nuclear weapons program. He regarded them as necessary for the Swedish defence and worked hard to gain the government's support on the issue. He was also involved in the secret operations for the formation of a Swedish resistance movement in the event of a Soviet invasion, the so-called Stay-behind movement.

== Personal life ==
On 14 April 1927 in Halmstad, Swedlund married Brita Alexandra Broberg (26 November 1901 in Eftra, Halland – 17 July 1993 in Danderyd), the daughter of major Carl Alfred Broberg and Ebba Susanna Ståhle. They had four children, Birgitta, Per, Katarina, and Kristina.

== Death ==
Swedlund died on 28 June 1965 at Mariehamn hospital on Åland. It was during a sailing from Stockholm to Åland that his illness worsened during the journey on the Sea of Åland. His personal doctor, who was on the sailing trip, took him to the hospital in Mariehamn where he died. Swedlund was buried at Skogsö Cemetery in Saltsjöbaden.

== Dates of rank ==
- 1919 – Second lieutenant
- 19?? – Lieutenant
- 1933 – Captain
- 1940 – Major
- 1942 – Lieutenant colonel
- 1944 – Colonel
- 1948 – Major general
- 1951 – Lieutenant general
- 1951 – General

== Awards and decorations ==
=== Swedish ===
- (Sweden) Knight and Commander of the Orders of His Majesty the King (Order of the Seraphim) (21 November 1963)
- (Sweden) Commander Grand Cross of the Order of the Sword
- (Sweden) Commander of the Order of the Polar Star
- (Sweden) Knight of the Order of Vasa

=== Foreign ===
- (Denmark) Grand Cross of the Order of the Dannebrog
- Grand Cross of the Order of the White Rose of Finland
- (Norway) Grand Cross of the Order of St. Olav (1 July 1954)
- (Austria) Grand Decoration of Honour of the Order of Merit of the Austrian Republic
- (Denmark) King Christian X's Liberty Medal
- (Finland) Commemorative medal for humanitarian work (Medaljen för humanitär verksamhet)

== Honours ==
- Member of the Royal Swedish Academy of War Sciences (1943)
- Honorary member of the Royal Swedish Society of Naval Sciences (1952)

Military offices
Preceded by Nils Björk	Defence Staff's Army Department; 1942–1944	Succeeded by Malcolm Murray
Preceded by Carl August Ehrensvärd	Vice Chief of the Defence Staff; 1944–1946	Succeeded by Thord Bonde
Preceded by None	Section 1 of the Defence Staff; 1944–1946	Succeeded by Thord Bonde
Preceded by Carl August Ehrensvärd	Chief of the Defence Staff; 1947–1951	Succeeded by Richard Åkerman
Preceded by Helge Jung	Supreme Commander; 1951–1961	Succeeded by Torsten Rapp
