= Helge Jung =

Swedish Army officer (1886–1978)

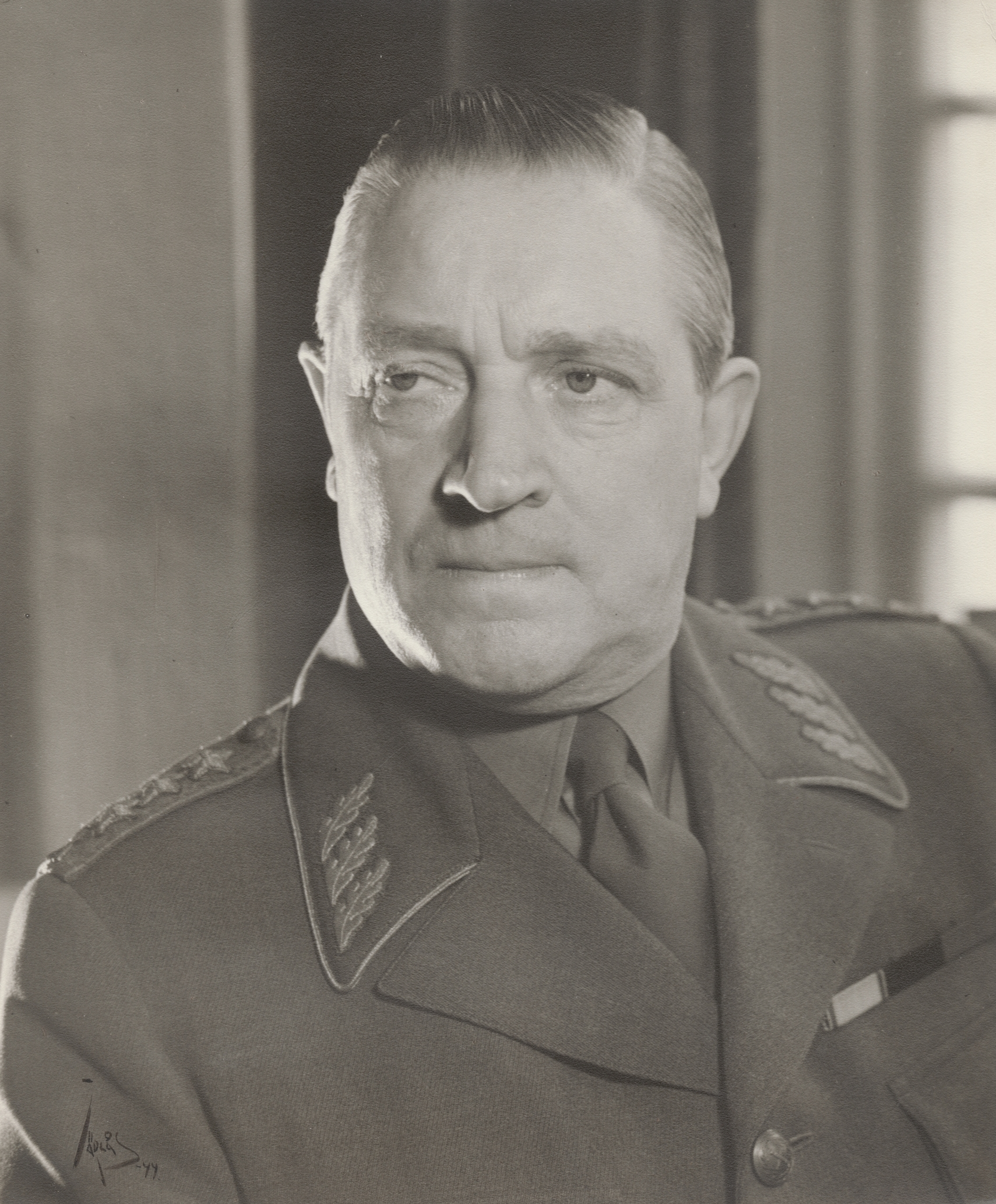
- Helge Jung in 1944
- Born: Helge Victor Jung; 23 March 1886; Malmö, Sweden
- Died: 3 January 1978 (aged 91); Stockholm, Sweden
- Burial place: Djursholm cemetery
- Relatives: Bengt Liljestrand (son-in-law)
- Military career
- Allegiance: Sweden
- Branch: Swedish Army
- Service years: 1906–1951
- Rank: General
- Commands: North Scanian Infantry Regiment; Life Regiment Grenadiers; Chief of the Army Staff; General Staff Corps; 2nd Army Division; II Military District; IV Military District; Commandant General in Stockholm; Supreme Commander

General Helge Victor Jung (23 March 1886 – 3 January 1978) was a Swedish Army officer. Jung's senior commands include the post of Chief of the Army Staff and the General Staff Corps, commander of the 2nd Army Division, military commander of the II Military District and the IV Military District. He served as the 2nd Supreme Commander from 1944 to 1951.

== Early life ==
Jung was born on 23 March 1886 in Malmö, Sweden, the son of the headmaster Victor Jung and his wife Maria (née Levan). Jung passed mogenhetsexamen in Malmö in 1903 and then studied history at Lund University for a couple of semesters from 1903 to 1904.

== Career ==
=== Early military career ===
He was accepted as a volunteer at the South Scanian Infantry Regiment (I 7) in 1904 and graduated from the Military Academy Karlberg in 1906 and was commissioned into the Swedish Army the same year as an underlöjtnant in the same regiment where he was promoted to lieutenant in 1909. From 1912 to 1916, Jung served as a regimental adjutant in the South Scanian Infantry Regiment, whereupon he attended the Royal Swedish Army Staff College from 1916 to 1918. He was a cadet officer at the Military Academy Karlberg from 1919 to 1922: first at the reserve officer courses during 1919 and then at the officer courses from 1919 to 1922. He was an assistant teacher in martial law and service regulations on the officer course at the Military Academy Karlberg from 1921 to 1922. In 1921 he was promoted to captain in the South Scanian Infantry Regiment.

During this time, Jung took an instructor course at the Royal Central Gymnastics Institute from 1907 to 1908, and served as company commander in the 1st Division's (I. arméfördelningen) volunteer school in Halmstad from 1908 to 1909 and from 1909 to 1910. After that he was a company commander at the reserve officer volunteer school in Karlsborg in 1910, and commander of the conscripts selected for special winter service (ski service) from 1910 to 1911, company commander at the reserve officer volunteer school in Karlsborg in 1911 and adjutant at the Infantry Officer Volunteer School (Infanteriofficersvolontärskolan) in Karlsborg from 1914 to 1915.

=== War history and defence debate ===
From 1922 to 1926, Jung served in the War History Department of the General Staff, after which he was a teacher in war history and strategy at the Royal Swedish Army Staff College from 1926 to 1928. He was promoted to major in 1928, after which he was acting head of the War History Department in the General Staff from 1928 to 1929 and regular head of the same from 1929 to 1933. He was secretary of the issues regarding the Swedish Army in the 1930 Defence Commission from 1930 to 1935. In 1933 he was promoted to lieutenant colonel, after which he was head of the Foreign Affairs Department in the General Staff from 1933 to 1936. He was secretary of the Committee on Defence during the Riksdag of 1936.

As head of the War History Department, he led the work on Sveriges krig 1611–1632 ("Sweden's war 1611–1632"), a book in eight volumes published 1936–1939. He himself conducted war history archive research in Latvia and Estonia in 1922, in Germany, Danzig and Copenhagen in 1923, in Finland in 1925 and 1926 as well as archival research and battlefield surveys in Danzig, Poland and Germany in 1927. He led archival research and battlefield research in Belgium, Netherlands, Czechoslovakia, Germany and Austria in 1929 and in several other countries in 1930.

The Defence Act of 1925 with its extensive downsizing of units and personnel, left its mark on Jung's generation of officers and instilled in many paralysis of action. In this situation, Jung deservedly took the lead for those who did not want to give up the fight for a modern defence with a broad base and adapted to society's resources. During his service in the War History Department, he gathered around him a group of younger talented army officers for a debate on defence issues and eventually founded Ny militär tidskrift ("New Military Journal") in 1927, whose editor he was 1927–1930. The circle of soldiers around this came to be called Jungjuntan ("Jung's junta") and it consisted of Axel Rappe, Carl August Ehrensvärd, Per Sylvan, Henry Peyron, Gustaf Petri, Axel Gyllenkrook, Gunnar Berggren with Jung as editor and unifying force. Jung was also behind the publication Antingen – eller ("Either – Or") (1930). Through the work of the 1930 Defence Commission, he had a decisive influence on the Defence Act of 1936 and it came to consist of a ten-year rearmament plan.

=== Chief of Army Staff and military commander ===
On 12 June 1936, Jung was promoted to colonel and appointed regimental commander of the North Scanian Infantry Regiment (I 6) from 1 October 1936. Even before he had time to take office, however, he was appointed on 30 June to be Acting Chief of Military Office of the Land Defence from 1 August, a post he held until 30 June 1937. On 13 November 1936, he was relieved of command of the North Scanian Infantry Regiment and was appointed executive commander of the Life Regiment Grenadiers (I 3) from 16 November, but was given continued leave to serve as Chief of the Military Office of the Land Defence.

As part of the Defence Act of 1936, the General Staff was divided into the Defence Staff and the Army Staff. This was entirely in line with Jung's junta's argument for a unified leadership of the armed forces in a more efficient organization. As a reward for his persistent work in the 1930 Defence Commission, Jung was appointed Chief of the Army Staff and the General Staff Corps and took office on 1 July 1937. At this time, Jung advocated active action for Finland in a possible war against the Soviet Union. In the years just before the outbreak of World War II, cracks appeared within Jung's junta and it dissipated. He was promoted to major general in 1938 and left the Chief of the Army Staff position on 30 September 1940. Thereafter, from 1 October 1940 until 30 September 1942, he was commander of the II Army Division (II. arméfördelningen), from 1 October 1942 to 30 September 1943, military commander of the II Military District and from 1 October 1943 to 31 March 1944, military commander of the IV Military District as well as Commandant General in Stockholm.

=== Supreme Commander ===
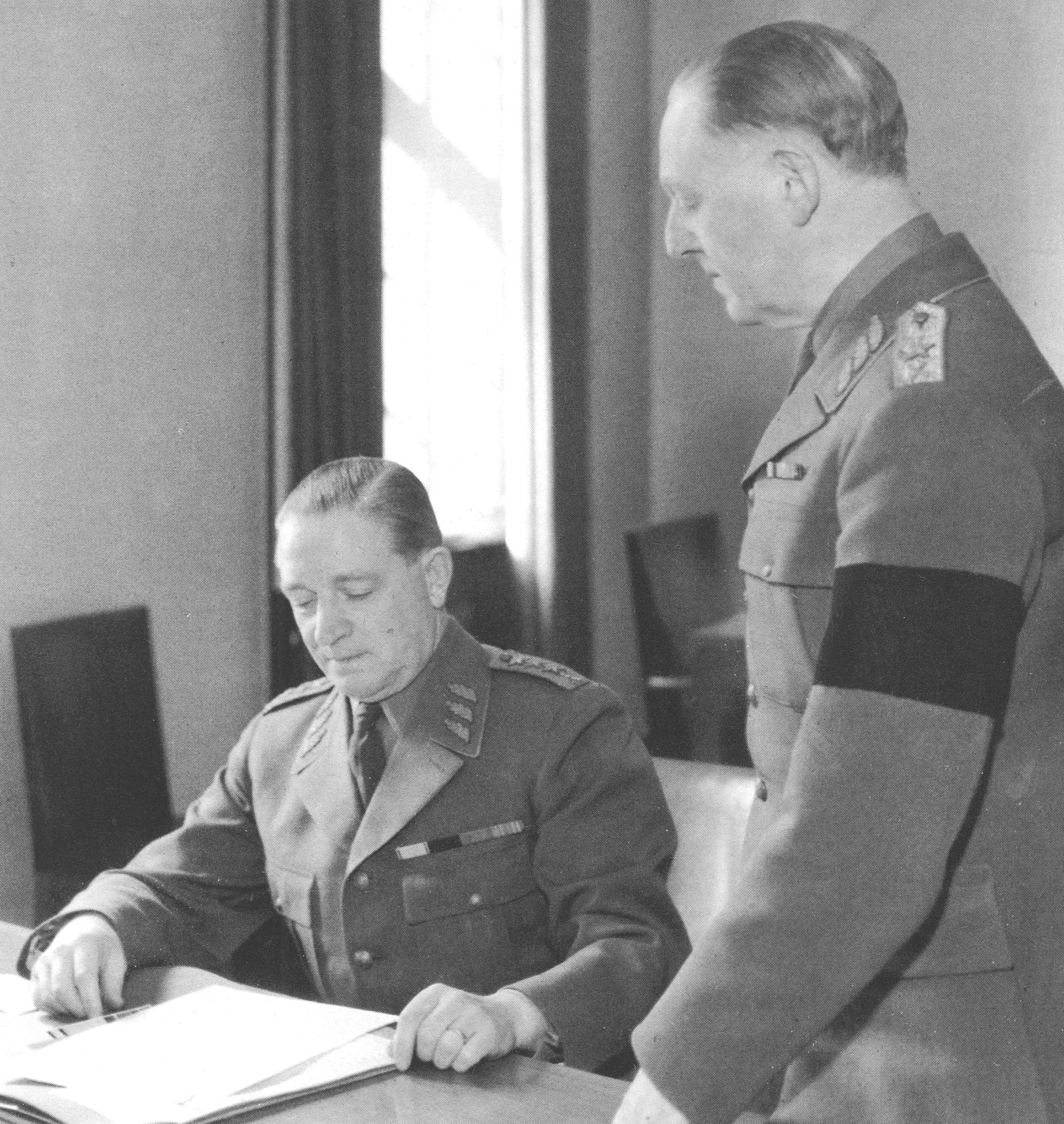
Supreme Commander, General Helge Jung (left) and the Chief of the Defence Staff, Major General Carl August Ehrensvärd.

On 31 December 1943, Jung was promoted to lieutenant general from 1 January 1944 and was appointed Supreme Commander of the Swedish Armed Forces for six years from 1 April 1944. He was promoted to general on 10 March 1944, beginning 1 April. In November 1949, he received an extended appointment as Supreme Commander until 31 March 1951, when he resigned.

During this time he was against the Swedish extradition of Baltic soldiers in 1945 and a friend of NATO, as his speech to students at Lund University in November 1949 shows. About his other activities as Supreme Commander, an obituary read: "Jung's work became very important in order to present a plan for the Swedish Armed Forces's future organization after World War II. He had to overcome many anti-defence forces, the war fatigue, the atomic bomb threat and the peace optimism. Jung worked in the same way as in the 1920s and 1930s. He gathered around him a group of skilled and useful officers and invested in a well-organized defence information. With indomitable energy, Jung succeeded in gaining the attention of the Swedish government for his proposals and in preventing the ruling organization from collapsing. He thus laid the foundation for the future development of the Swedish defence for many years. It has been said by the former Supreme Commander, General Stig Synnergren that ’the modernization and anchoring of the defence among the Swedish people is Jung's lasting effort’." Historian Kent Zetterberg has stated that “Helge Jung was to a large extent a complex nature. His personality had features of cunning and tactical calculation, yes cynicism, but at the same time there were also clear elements of the ideality and selfless work for strengthening the Swedish defence.”

== Personal life ==
In 1913, he married Ruth Wehtje (1893–1951), the daughter of the deputy district judge Ernst Wehtje and Mimmi Ahnfelt. In 1952, he married Dagmar Bager (1897–1955), the daughter of vice consul John Jeansson and Sigrid Maijström. He was the father of Stig (born 1915), Karin (born 1917) and Elisabet (born 1919–1994).

== Death ==
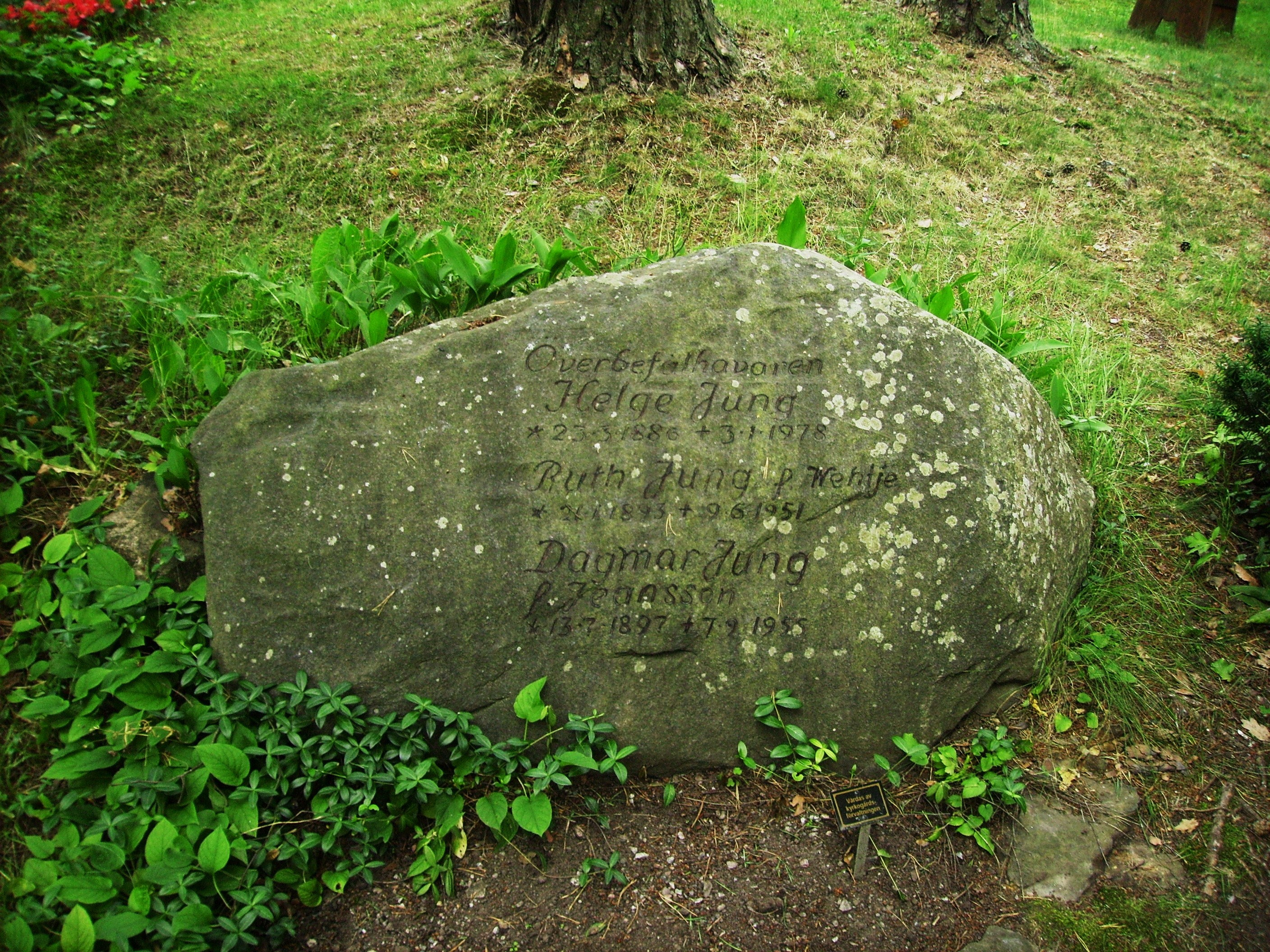
Jung's grave in Djursholm Cemetery.

Jung died on 3 January 1978 and was interred on 10 February 1978 in Djursholm cemetery.

== Dates of rank ==
- 1906 – Underlöjtnant
- 1909 – Lieutenant
- 1921 – Captain
- 1929 – Major
- 1933 – Lieutenant colonel
- 12 June 1936 – Colonel
- 1938 – Major general
- 1 January 1944 – Lieutenant general
- 1 April 1944 – General

== Awards and decorations ==
=== Swedish ===
- (Sweden) Knight and Commander of the Orders of His Majesty (31 March 1951)
- (Sweden) Commander Grand Cross of the Order of the Sword (6 June 1944)
- (Sweden) Commander 1st Class of the Order of the Sword (6 June 1939)
- (Sweden) Knight 1st Class of the Order of the Sword (1927)
- (Sweden) Knight 1st Class of the Order of Vasa (1932)
- (Sweden) Knight of the Order of the Polar Star (1933)
- (Sweden) King Gustaf V's Jubilee Commemorative Medal (1948)
- (Sweden) Home Guard Medal of Merit in Gold
- (Sweden) Swedish Central Federation for Voluntary Military Training Medal of Merit in gold
- (Sweden) Swedish Civil Protection Association Medal of Merit in gold
- (Sweden) Gold Medal of the Swedish Red Cross
- (Sweden) Gold Medal of the National Federation of Swedish Women's Auxiliary Defence Services (Riksförbundet Sveriges lottakårers guldmedalj)
- (Sweden) Gold Medal of the Stockholm Association for Volunteer Military Training (Stockholms befäls(utbildnings)förbunds guldmedalj)
- (Sweden) Gold Medal of the Southern Scanian Association for Volunteer Military Training (Södra skånska befäls(utbildnings)förbunds guldmedalj)
- (Sweden) Badge of Honor of the Swedish Reserve Officers Association (Svenska reservofficersföreningens hederstecken)

=== Foreign ===
- (Denmark) Grand Cross of the Order of the Dannebrog (between 1945 and 1947)
- (Denmark) Commander Second Class of the Order of the Dannebrog (between 1935 and 1940)
- (Denmark) King Christian X's Liberty Medal
- Commander Grand Cross of the Order of the White Rose of Finland (between 1947 and 1950)
- Commander of the Order of the White Rose of Finland (between 1935 and 1940)
- Knight 1st Class of the Order of the White Rose of Finland (between 1931 and 1935)
- (Norway) Grand Cross of the Order of St. Olav (between 1945 and 1947)
- (Norway) Commander of the Order of St. Olav (between 1935 and 1940)
- (Lithuania) Commander Grand Cross of the Order of the Lithuanian Grand Duke Gediminas (between 1935 and 1940)
- (Nazi Germany) Order of the German Eagle with Star (1940)
- (Estonia) Third Class of the Order of the Cross of the Eagle (between 1935 and 1940)
- (France) Commander of the Legion of Honour (between 1935 and 1940)
- (France) Officer of the Legion of Honour (between 1931 and 1935)
- (Latvia) Commander of the Order of the Three Stars (3rd Class, 15 November 1935)
- (Netherlands) Commander of the Order of Orange-Nassau with swords (between 1935 and 1940)
- (Poland) Commander Second Class of the Order of Polonia Restituta (between 1935 and 1940)
- (Kingdom of Hungary) Commander of the Order of Merit of the Republic of Hungary (between 1935 and 1940)
- (Kingdom of Prussia) Knight Fourth Class of the Order of the Crown (1909)
- (Denmark) Badge of Honor of the Danish Shooting, Gymnastics and Sports Associations (Danska Skytte-, gymnastik-och idrottsföreningars hederstecken)

== Honours ==
- Member of the Royal Society for the Publication of Manuscripts concerning Scandinavian History (1929)
- Member of the Royal Swedish Academy of War Sciences (1931)
- Honorary member of the Royal Swedish Society of Naval Sciences (1946)

== Bibliography ==
- Jung, Helge (1923). Sveriges möjligheter till självförsörjning: en studie rörande jordbrukets och industriens krigsberedskap (in Swedish). Stockholm: Seelig & C:o. SELIBR 8220850.
- Jung, Helge, ed. (1930). Antingen-eller: freds- och försvarsproblemet i saklig belysning (in Swedish). Stockholm: Ny militär tidskrifts bokförlag. SELIBR 906270.
- Jung, Helge (1947). Vårt framtida försvar: överbefälhavarens förslag (in Swedish). Stockholm. SELIBR 1720170.
- Jung, Helge, ed. (1947). Överbefälhavarens yttrande över 1945 års militärutrednings "Betänkande och förslag angående förhållandet mellan befäl och meniga inom krigsmakten" (in Swedish). Stockholm: [Folk och försvar]. SELIBR 1457870.
- Jung, Helge, ed. (1957). Öst och väst och vi: grupparbete (in Swedish). Stockholm: Norstedt. SELIBR 1369365.

Military offices
| Preceded by Martin Hanngren | North Scanian Infantry Regiment; 1936–1936 | Succeeded by Henry Kellgren |
| Preceded by Hugo Cederschiöld | Life Regiment Grenadiers; 1936–1937 | Succeeded by Axel Gyllenkrok |
| Preceded by Ernst af Klercker | Chief of the Army Staff General Staff Corps; 1937–1940 | Succeeded by Folke Högberg |
| Preceded by Ivar Holmquist | II Army Division; 1940–1942 | Succeeded by Björn Olof Karlsson |
| Preceded by None | II Military District; 1942–1943 | Succeeded by Henry Tottie |
| Preceded by Erik Testrup | IV Military District Commandant General in Stockholm; 1943–1944 | Succeeded by Arvid Moberg |
| Preceded by Olof Thörnell | Supreme Commander; 1944–1951 | Succeeded by Nils Swedlund |
