= Torsten Rapp =

Swedish Air Force officer

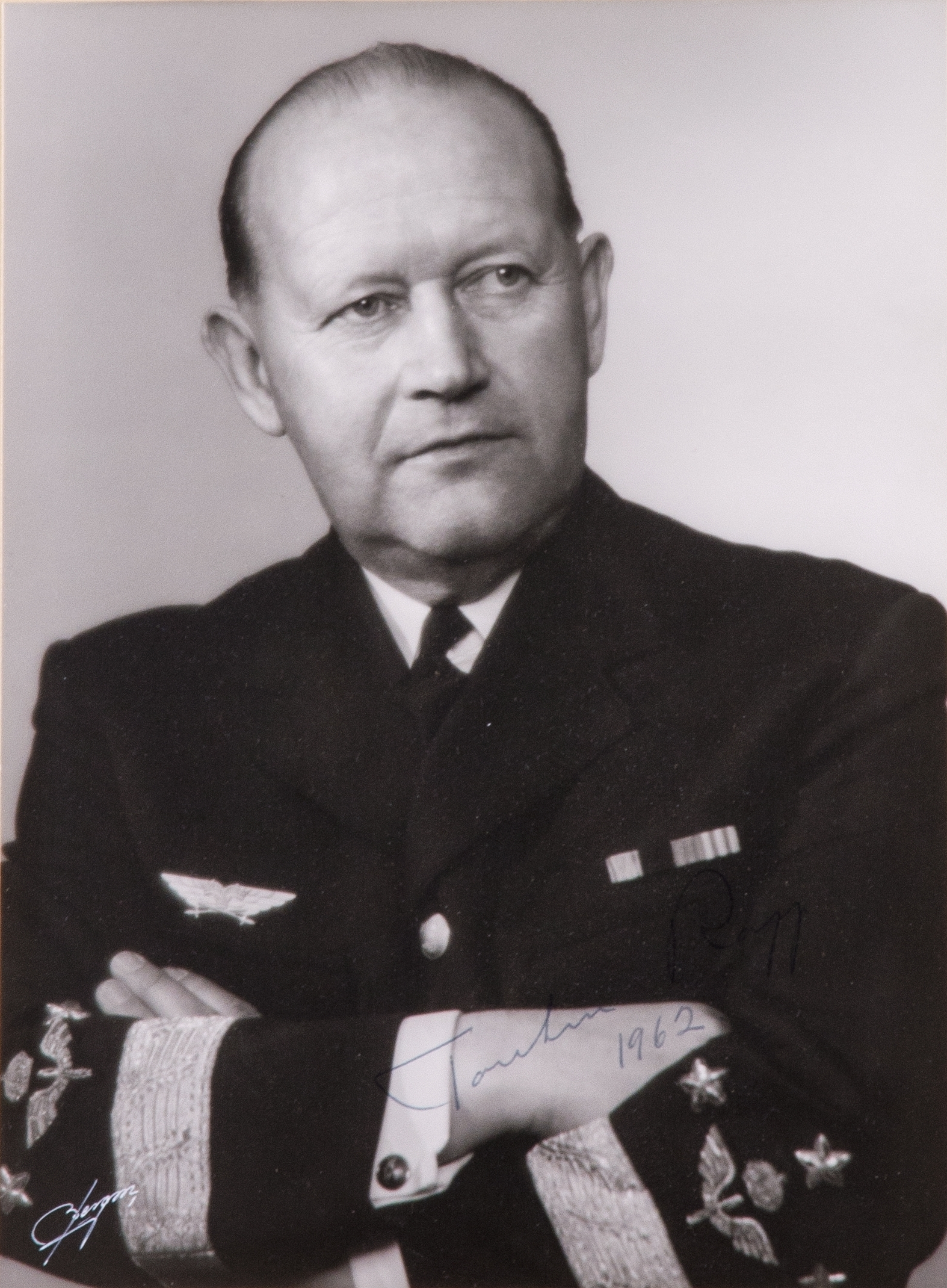
- General Rapp in 1962.
- Born: 20 April 1905; Stockholm, Sweden
- Died: 23 March 1993 (aged 87); Stockholm, Sweden
- Military career
- Allegiance: Sweden
- Branch: Swedish Navy (1923–30); Swedish Army (1930–70)
- Service years: 1923–1970
- Rank: General
- Commands: Blekinge Wing; Vice Chief of the Air Staff; Fourth Air Group; Third Air Group; Chief of the Air Force; Supreme Commander

General Bo Torsten Rapp (20 April 1905 – 23 March 1993) was a senior Swedish Air Force officer. Rapp started as a naval officer in 1926 before transferring to the Swedish Air Force in 1928. Over the years, he steadily climbed the ranks, serving in various roles and completing training courses. Notable milestones include becoming a lieutenant colonel in 1944 and commanding the Blekinge Wing in 1944. He later assumed important positions such as Vice Chief of the Air Staff and Chief of the Air Force, contributing to significant reforms in Swedish defense, including improved inter-service coordination. Rapp eventually became the Supreme Commander of the Swedish Armed Forces in 1961, a position he held until 1970, overseeing substantial changes in military organization. After retiring from active duty, he continued his service in the Swedish Air Force reserve until 1981.

== Early life ==
Rapp was born on 20 April 1905 in Hedvig Eleonora Parish in Stockholm, Sweden, the son of Johan David Rapp, a wholesaler, and his wife Eva Hedvig Gustava (née Swartz). He passed studentexamen at Saltsjöbadens samskola in the spring of 1923 and became a sea cadet on 29 June 1923.

== Career ==
Rapp graduated as a naval officer on 5 October 1926 and was commissioned as officer with the rank of acting sub-lieutenant (fänrik) in the Swedish Navy on 7 October 1926. He became a lieutenant there on 6 October 1928 and was then commanded to the Swedish Air Force on 1 November 1928. There Rapp became a lieutenant on 1 July 1930, and he then underwent the Royal Swedish Naval Staff College's general course from 1932 to 1933 and its staff course from 1934 to 1935.

He served at the Organization Department of the Air Staff from 1 June 1935 to 1938 and became a captain in the Swedish Air Force on 30 June 1937. Rapp became a member of the board for the Defence Forces Central Civilian Employee Office (Försvarsväsendets centrala civilanställningsbyrå) on 1 January 1938 and division commander of the F 2 Hägernäs in 1938. He was acting head of the Organization Department of the Air Staff in 1941 and became head on 1 July 1943. Rapp was a member of the 1942 Reserve Officer Experts (1942 års reservbefälssakkunniga) from June to November 1942 and he became a major in the Swedish Air Force on 1 July 1942 and a lieutenant colonel on 1 April 1944.

He became commanding officer of Blekinge Wing (F 17) on 23 June 1944 and was promoted to colonel on 1 July 1947. Rapp became Vice Chief of the Air Staff on 1 October 1948 and was a member of the Swedish Armed Forces School Study from June 1950 to March 1952. He was a member of the board of the Swedish Officers Association on 25 November 1950 and became commanding officer of the Fourth Air Group (Fjärde flygeskadern, E 4) on 1 April 1951. Rapp became commander of the Third Air Group (Tredje flygeskadern, E 3) on 1 July 1954 and was promoted to major general on 1 October 1955. He became acting head of the Aircraft Department of the Royal Swedish Air Force Materiel Administration on 1 July 1956 and became a member of the board of the National Aeronautical Research Institute in 1957.

Rapp was appointed Vice Chief of the Royal Swedish Air Force Materiel Administration and became a member of the board of the Swedish National Defence Research Institute on 1 October 1957. He was promoted to lieutenant general and became Chief of the Air Force on 15 January (took office 1 July) 1960. He was promoted to general and was Supreme Commander of the Swedish Armed Forces from 10 March (took office 1 October) 1961. During his time on the post, major changes were made to the Swedish defense, including an enhanced coordination between the army, the air force and the navy. The reorganization also meant that the Supreme Commander was given greater responsibility. Rapp left the post on 30 September 1970 and he was then general in the Swedish Air Force reserve from 1 October 1970 to 1981.

== Personal life ==
Rapp married on 30 September 1933 in Stockholm with Ulla Gerda Maria Willers (1908–2005), the daughter of first secretary of the Royal Railway Board Johan Harald Hjalmar Willers and Agnes Lindberg. He was the father of Wilhelm (1935–1992), Lennart (born 1937) and Marianne (born 1944).

== Death ==
Rapp died on 23 March 1993 in Mary Magdalene Parish in Stockholm. The funeral took place on 14 April 1993 in Solna Church. He was interred on 3 August 1993 at Ingarö Cemetery in Ingarö, Stockholm County.

== Military career ==
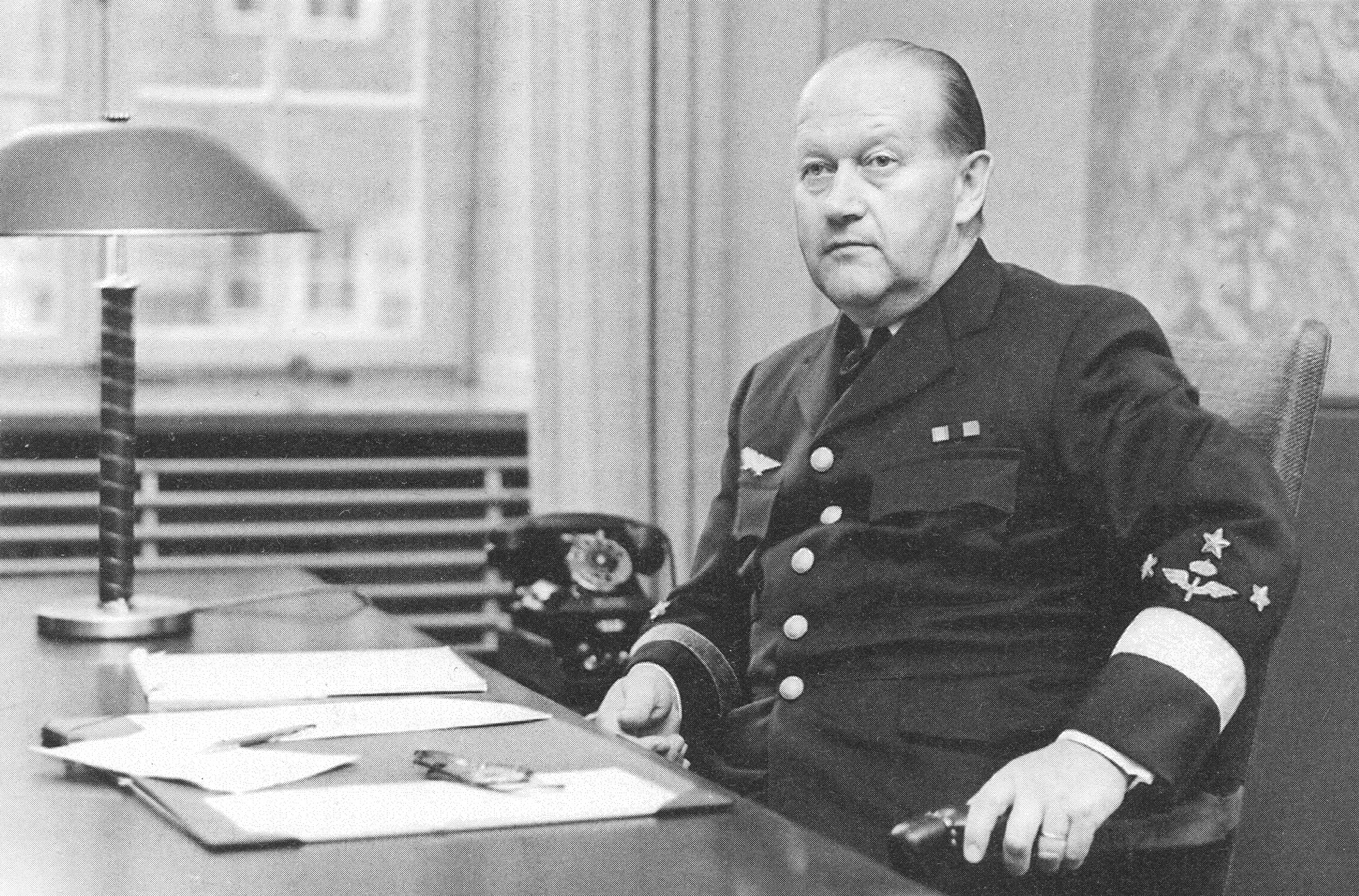
Torsten Rapp, 1960s.

In 1923 Rapp joined the Swedish Navy as a sea cadet

- 1926–1928 Acting Sub-Lieutenant Swedish Navy
- 1928–1930 Lieutenant Swedish Navy
- 1930–1937 Lieutenant Swedish Air Force
- 1937–1942 Captain Swedish Air Force
- 1942–1943 Major Swedish Air Force
- 1944–1947 Lieutenant Colonel, Wing commander Blekinge Wing
- 1947–1948 Colonel, Wing commander Blekinge Wing
- 1948–1951 Vice Chief of the Air Staff
- 1951–1954 Commander of Fourth Air Group (Fjärde flygeskadern, E 4)
- 1954–1956 Major General, Commander of Third Air Group (Tredje flygeskadern, E 3)
- 1957–1960 Vice Chief of the Royal Swedish Air Force Materiel Administration
- 1960–1961 Lieutenant General, Chief of the Air Force
- 1961–1970 General, Supreme Commander of the Swedish Armed Forces

== Dates of rank ==
- 7 October 1926 – Acting sub-lieutenant (Navy)
- 6 October 1928 – Lieutenant (Air Force)
- 30 June 1937 – Captain
- 1 July 1942 – Major
- 1 April 1944 – Lieutenant colonel
- 1 July 1947 – Colonel
- 1 October 1955 – Major general
- 1 July 1960 – Lieutenant general
- 1 October 1961 – General

== Awards and decorations ==
=== Swedish ===
- (Sweden) Knight and Commander of the Orders of His Majesty (16 November 1970)
- (Sweden) Commander Grand Cross of the Order of the Sword (23 November 1961)
- (Sweden) Commander 1st Class of the Order of the Sword (5 June 1954)
- (Sweden) Knight of the Order of the Sword (1943)
- (Sweden) Knight of the Order of the Polar Star (1951)
- (Sweden) Knight of the Order of Vasa (1945)
- (Sweden) Swedish Women's Voluntary Defence Organization Royal Medal of Merit in silver
- (Sweden) Swedish Navy Medal Torpedo Firing Medal (Marinens medalj för skjutning med torped, TorpM)

=== Foreign ===
- (Norway) Grand Cross of the Order of St. Olav (1 July 1967)
- 1st Class Commander of the Order of the White Rose of Finland
- (Iran) Commander 1st Class of Order of Homayoun
- (United States) Commander of the Legion of Merit (12 April 1965)
- (Denmark) King Christian X's Liberty Medal

== Honours ==
- Member of the Royal Swedish Academy of War Sciences (1959)
- Member of the Royal Swedish Society of Naval Sciences (1962)

== Bibliography ==
- Rapp, Torsten (1960). Luftkrigföringens vapensystem: fakta och reflexioner kring utveckling och ledning : årsberättelse av föredraganden i luftkrigsvetenskap (avd III) [Aerial warfare weapon systems: facts and reflections on the development and management: annual report of the rapporteur of the aerial warfare studies (Section III)] (in Swedish). Linköping. SELIBR 12032902.

Military offices
| Preceded by None | Blekinge Wing; 1944–1948 | Succeeded by Hugo Svenow |
| Preceded by Karl Silfverberg | Vice Chief of the Air Staff; 1948–1951 | Succeeded by Greger Falk |
| Preceded by Birger Schyberg | Chief of the Air Force; 1951–1954 | Succeeded by Ingvar Berg |
| Preceded by Axel Ljungdahl | Third Air Group; 1954–1956 | Succeeded by Lage Thunberg |
| Preceded by Bengt Jacobsson | Vice Chief of the Royal Swedish Air Force Materiel Administration; 1954–1956 | Succeeded by Lage Thunberg |
| Preceded by Axel Ljungdahl | Chief of the Air Force; 1957–1960 | Succeeded by Lage Thunberg |
| Preceded by Nils Swedlund | Supreme Commander; 1961–1970 | Succeeded by Stig Synnergren |
