= Oscar Nygren =

Swedish Army officer

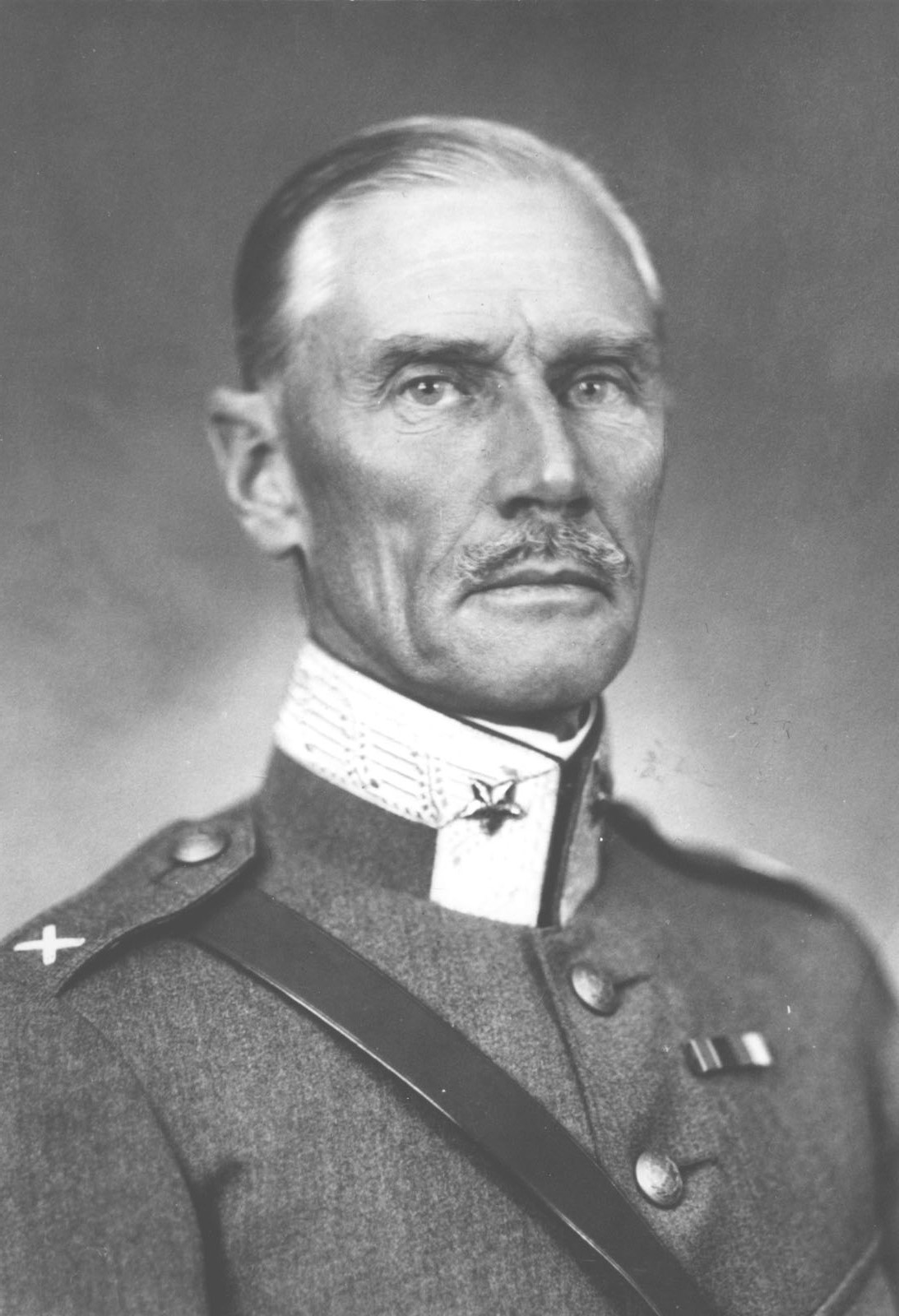
- Nygren as a Major general.
- Born: Oscar Eugène Nygren; 26 September 1872; Gävle, Sweden
- Died: 12 January 1960 (aged 87); Stockholm, Sweden
- Burial place: Norra begravningsplatsen
- Military career
- Allegiance: Sweden
- Branch: Swedish Army
- Service years: 1892–1937, 1939–1941
- Rank: General
- Commands: Military Office of the Ministry of Land Defence; Svea Life Guards; Commandant in Boden Fortress; Upper Norrland's Troops; Chief of the General Staff; Chief of the Army; 2nd Army Corps

General Oscar Eugène Nygren (26 September 1872 – 12 January 1960) was a Swedish Army officer. Nygren's military career spanned over four decades, marked by a series of senior appointments. Beginning as a second lieutenant in the Hälsinge Regiment in 1892, he underwent extensive training, including attending the Royal Swedish Army Staff College and serving as a cadet at the General Staff. Nygren steadily ascended the ranks, reaching the positions of major, Vice Chief of the Military Office of the Ministry of Land Defence, and lieutenant colonel at the General Staff.

His noteworthy roles included leading the Royal Swedish Army Staff College and serving as the Chief of the Military Office of the Ministry of Land Defence. Nygren also contributed to various international committees as a military expert and chaired a pension insurance company. Upon retiring in 1937, he achieved the highest rank of general in his military career. During World War II, he was called back into service as the commander of the newly formed 2nd Army Corps, holding leadership positions in Upper Norrland and West Sweden, showcasing his contributions to the military and international committees.

== Early life ==
Nygren was born on 26 September 1872 in Gävle, Sweden, the son of Richard Nygren, a city broker, and his wife Thekla (née Engelmark).

== Career ==
=== Military career ===
Nygren was commissioned as an officer 1892 and was assigned as a second lieutenant to Hälsinge Regiment (I 14) the same year. He studied at the Royal Swedish Army Staff College from 1896 to 1898 and was a cadet at the General Staff from 1898 to 1901. Nygren became a lieutenant at the General Staff in 1902 and was promoted to captain in 1904. He was adjutant to the head of the Ministry of Land Defence from 1907 to 1910 and was transferred to Hälsinge Regiment (I 14) in 1909. Nygren was major at the General Staff in 1912 and was appointed Chief of Staff in the III Army Division in 1912.

He was Vice Chief of the Military Office of the Ministry of Land Defence in 1915 and was lieutenant colonel at the General Staff in 1915. Nygren was appointed head of the Royal Swedish Army Staff College in 1917 and conducted study trips to Germany, Bulgaria, Turkey, the Western Front and the Macedonian front in 1918. Back in Sweden he became colonel in the General Staff in 1919. He was appointed Chief of the Military Office of the Ministry of Land Defence in 1919 conducted a study trip to the Italian Front in 1922. Back in Sweden he became executive officer of the Svea Life Guards (I 1) in 1923.

Nygren was appointed commanding officer of the 7th Infantry Brigade in 1926 and Commandant in Boden Fortress in 1928. He was promoted to major general in 1929 and was appointed military commander of Upper Norrland's Troops in 1930. Nygren was after that Chief of the General Staff from 1933 to 1937 and acting Chief of the Army from 1936 to 1937 when he was promoted to lieutenant general. He was promoted to general upon retirement in 1937 and was placed in the reserve the year after. In 1939, when World War II broke out, Nygren was appointed commander of the newly formed 2nd Army Corps in Upper Norrland and in 1940 he became commanding officer of the same in West Sweden. Nygren left the position in August 1941.

=== Other work ===
Nygren was military member of the Supreme Court from 1934 to 1954. He was military expert for the committee on the League of Nations and for Sweden's representative at the League of Nations' council meeting in Geneva in 1922. Nygren was Swedish member of the League of Nations' permanent advisory military committee and assistant to the Swedish representative in the League of Nations' disarmament commission. He was also chairman of the board the pension insurance company Allmänna pensionsförsäkringsbolaget.

== Personal life ==
In 1905, Nygren married Jenny Öhgren (1886–1959), the daughter of councillor G. A. Öhgren and Ina (née Granberg). He was the father of Colonel Hans Nygren (1906–1982).

== Death ==
Nygren died on 12 January 1960 in Stockholm and was buried in Norra begravningsplatsen in Stockholm.

== Dates of rank ==
- 11 November 1892 – Underlöjtnant
- 7 August 1896 – Lieutenant 2nd Class
- 9 November 1900 – Lieutenant 1st Class
- 31 December 1904 – Captain
- 20 November 1909 – Captain 1st Class
- 10 January 1913 – Major
- 17 December 1915 – Lieutenant colonel
- 16 July 1919 – Colonel
- 22 November 1929 – Major general
- 1 July 1936 – Lieutenant general
- 1 October 1937 – General

== Awards and decorations ==
=== Swedish ===
- (Sweden) Commander Grand Cross of the Order of the Sword (14 November 1936)
- (Sweden) Commander 2nd Class of the Order of Vasa (6 June 1923)
- (Sweden) Knight of the Order of the Polar Star (1919)
- (Sweden) Landstorm Gold Medal (Landstorm-guldmedalj)
- (Sweden) Voluntary Motor Transportation Corps' Gold Medal (Frivilliga automobilkårens guldmedalj)

=== Foreign ===
- Grand Cross of the Order of the White Rose of Finland
- (Poland) Grand Cross of the Order of Polonia Restituta
- (Denmark) Commander 1st Class of the Order of the Dannebrog
- (Norway) Commander with Star of the Order of St. Olav
- (Bulgaria) Commander with Sword of the Order of Saint Alexander
- (Chile) 1st Class of the Order of Merit
- (France) Commander of the Legion of Honour
- (France) Commander of the Order of the Black Star
- Commander of the Order of the Crown of Italy
- (Netherlands) Commander with Sword of the Order of Orange-Nassau
- (Ottoman Empire) 3rd Class with Sword of the Order of Osmanieh
- (Grand Duchy of Baden) Knight 1st Class of the Order of the Zähringer Lion
- (Kingdom of Prussia) Knight of the 3rd Class of the Order of the Crown
- (Russian Empire) Knight 3rd Class of the Order of Saint Anna
- (Austria) 1st Class of the Austrian Red Cross' Badge of Honor

== Honours ==
- Member of the Royal Swedish Academy of War Sciences (1919)

Military offices
Preceded by Hjalmar Säfwenberg	Military Office of the Ministry of Land Defence; 1919–1923	Succeeded by Carl Sjögreen
Preceded by Ernst Silfverswärd	Svea Life Guards; 1923–1927	Succeeded by Carl Tersmeden
Preceded by Curt Rappe	Commandant in Boden Fortress; 1928–1930	Succeeded by Carl Reutersvärd
Preceded by Gösta Lilliehöök	Upper Norrland's Troops; 1930–1933	Succeeded by Pontus Reuterswärd
Preceded by Bo Boustedt	Chief of the General Staff; 1933–1937	Succeeded by None
Preceded by None	Chief of the Army (acting); 1936–1937	Succeeded by Per Sylvan
Professional and academic associations
Preceded by Ludvig Hammarskiöld	President of the Royal Swedish Academy of War Sciences; 1937–1939	Succeeded by Otto Lybeck
