= Pontus Reuterswärd =

Swedish Army officer

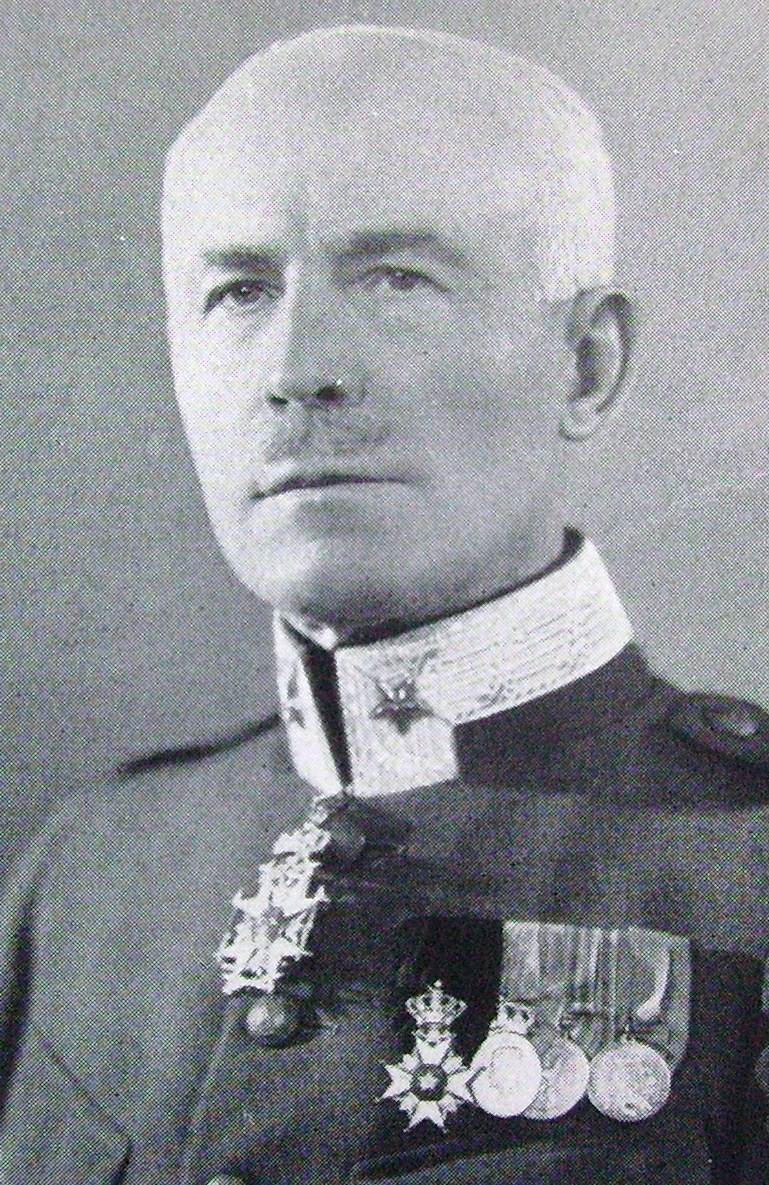
- Reuterswärd as major general
- Born: Carl Pehr Pontus Reuterswärd; 4 October 1871; Örebro, Sweden
- Died: 25 May 1949 (aged 77); Stockholm, Sweden
- Relatives: Gustaf Uggla (father-in-law)
- Military career
- Allegiance: Sweden
- Branch: Swedish Army
- Service years: 1891–1939
- Rank: Lieutenant General
- Commands: Swedish Infantry Officer Candidate School; Skaraborg Regiment; 5th Infantry Brigade; Commandant in Boden Fortress; Upper Norrland Troops

Lieutenant General Carl Pehr Pontus Reuterswärd (4 October 1871 – 25 May 1949) was a senior Swedish Army officer. Reuterswärd hailed from a distinguished lineage, with notable ancestors in military and diplomatic service. He pursued a military career, graduating from the Military Academy Karlberg in 1891. Throughout his service, Reuterswärd held various positions, including company officer and military attaché, and underwent further training at the Royal Swedish Army Staff College. Rising through the ranks, he attained the position of lieutenant general by 1939.

Beyond his military endeavors, Reuterswärd engaged in civic duties, serving as a city councilor and inspector for educational institutions. He also played an active role in the Reuterswärd Family Association. Additionally, Reuterswärd authored several works, including writings advocating for Sweden's neutrality policy and a biography of his uncle, Lieutenant General Edvard Brändström. His legacy intertwines military service, civic engagement, and literary contributions, reflecting a multifaceted life of public service and intellectual pursuits.

== Early life ==
Reuterswärd was born on 4 October 1871 in Örebro, Sweden, the son of Colonel Wilhelm Reuterswärd and his wife Carolina Adelaide (Adéle) Brändström. He was the great-great-grandson of Anders Fredrik Reuterswärd and his maternal uncle was Lieutenant General Edvard Brändström who served as Swedish envoy in Russia. Reuterswärd was the brother of deputy director Wilhelm Reuterswärd (1872–1952) and businessman Carl Reuterswärd (1874–1947). Pontus Reuterswärd completed his mogenhetsexamen in Örebro on 21 May 1889 and he enlisted the same day in Västgöta Regiment where he became a sergeant a year later. On 28 July 1890, Reuterswärd enrolled at the Military Academy Karlberg in Stockholm.

== Career ==
Reuterswärd attended the Military Academy Karlberg in Stockholm in the same class as future Lieutenant Generals Gösta Lilliehöök and Axel Hultkrantz and Major Generals Hjalmar Säfwenberg and Gilbert Hamilton. He graduated in 1891 and was assigned a second lieutenant to the 1st Life Grenadier Regiment the same year. He served as a company officer at the Military Academy Karlberg from 1898 to 1901, as a military attaché at the Swedish legations in Brussels and The Hague in 1902, and conducted studies with the Belgian and Dutch armies in 1902. He attended the Royal Swedish Army Staff College from 1904 to 1906. In 1905, Reuterswärd served as the first adjutant to the Second Army Division's staff.

Reuterswärd was a member of the Exercise Regulation Committee (Exercisreglementskommittén) in 1914 and became a major in the Älvsborg Regiment in 1915. He was the head of the Swedish Infantry Officer Candidate School in Karlsborg from 1915 to 1916, served on the fronts of the Austro-Hungarian Army in 1916, and became a colonel and the commander of the Skaraborg Regiment in 1922. Reuterswärd served in the Finnish Army in 1924 and in the German Army in 1928. Between 1927 and 1930, he was the commander of the 5th Infantry Brigade. He was appointed commandant of Boden Fortress in 1930. He was promoted to major general in the army in 1932. He subsequently served as the military commander for the troops in Upper Norrland from 1933 to 1937. Reuterswärd was promoted to lieutenant general in 1939, two years after his retirement.

=== Other work ===
In addition to his military career, Reuterswärd was active in local government, serving as a city councilor in Linköping from 1909 to 1911, and in Skövde as vice chairman from 1921 to 1930. He also served as inspector for Skövde Higher General Secondary School from 1920 to 1930, city councilor in Skövde from 1922 to 1930, church councilor in Boden, and inspector for the secondary school in Boden from 1933 to 1937. Additionally, he was a board alternate in the Reuterswärd Family Association (Reuterswärdska ättens släktföreningen) from 1925, again from 1931, and further from 1934. In 1943, he was elected chairman following engineer Carl-Fredrik Reuterswärd. He was re-elected in October 1946. He served as chairman of the board of the C.J. & H.R. Hierta Memorial Foundation.

Reuterswärd wrote several books, essays in newspapers, and articles in journals, including "Should Sweden Abandon its Neutrality Policy in the Future?" (Bör Sverige i framtiden frångå neutralitetspolitiken?, 1945), where he advocates for a strong defense of neutrality, as well as a biography of his uncle, Lieutenant General and Envoy Edvard Brändström (1947).

== Personal life ==
On 20 November 1905 in Linköping Cathedral, Reuterswärd married Eva Thurinna Uggla (1879–1947), the daughter of General Gustaf Uggla and Augusta Eleonora von Post. They had five children: Colonel Wilhelm Reuterswärd (1907–1999), Colonel Carl Reuterswärd (1909–1997), Lieutenant Colonel Gustaf Reuterswärd (1910–1959), Adéle Lundborg (1914–1983), and jurist Edvard Reuterswärd (1916–1994).

== Death ==
Reuterswärd was hit by a car on 15 March 1949, at Kungsgården in Drottningholm. He suffered a concussion and a fracture in his left leg and was taken to Serafimerlasarettet. He was later transferred to Sophiahemmet, where it was revealed that the concussion was mild in nature. Reuterswärd died two months later on 25 May 1949, in Stockholm, Sweden. The funeral took place on 31 May 1949, at Lovö Church on Lovön in Ekerö Municipality. He was buried on the same date in Lovö cemetery. The officiant was Court Chaplain Otto Hermansson of Skövde. A large number of senior military officers were present, including the Supreme Commander of the Swedish Armed Forces, General Helge Jung, and the Chief of the Army, Lieutenant General Carl August Ehrensvärd.

== Dates of rank ==
- 21 June 1890 – Sergeant
- 13 November 1891 – Underlöjtnant
- 1 July 1897 – Lieutenant
- 5 July 1907 – Captain
- 28 May 1915 – Major
- 18 January 1918 – Lieutenant colonel
- 27 September 1922 – Colonel
- 17 June 1932 – Major general
- 29 September 1939 – Lieutenant general

== Awards and decorations ==
=== Swedish ===
- (Sweden) Commander Grand Cross of the Order of the Sword (15 November 1943)
- (Sweden) Commander 1st Class of the Order of the Sword (10 December 1928)
- (Sweden) Commander 2nd Class of the Order of the Sword (15 December 1925)
- (Sweden) Knight of the Order of the Sword (6 June 1912)
- (Sweden) Knight of the Order of the Polar Star (25 November 1922)
- (Sweden) Skaraborg County Shooting Association (Skaraborgs läns skytteförbund) gold medal (1929)
- (Sweden) Skaraborg's Draft Area Landstorm Association Medal of Merit in Gold (Skaraborgs inskrivningsområdes landsstormsförbund förtjänstmedalj i guld)
- (Sweden) Landstorm Silver Medal (1928)

=== Foreign ===
- (Denmark) Commander 1st Class of the Order of the Dannebrog (1929)
- Commander of the Order of the White Rose of Finland (1925)
- (Belgium) Knight of the Order of Leopold (1903)
- (Belgium) 2nd Class of the Military Cross (1903)

== Honours ==
- Member of the Royal Swedish Academy of War Sciences (1928)

== Bibliography ==
- Reuterswärd, Pontus (1947). Generallöjtnanten och envoyén Edvard Brändström, svenskt sändebud i Ryssland 1906-1920 (in Swedish). Stockholm: Norstedt. SELIBR 30950.
- Reuterswärd, Pontus (1945). Bör Sverige i framtiden frångå neutralitetspolitiken? (in Swedish). Stockholm. SELIBR 2236023.
- Reuterswärd, Pontus (1943). Skandinavism, nordism, försvarsförbund (in Swedish). Stockholm: Wahlström & Widstrand i distr. SELIBR 1412899.
- Reuterswärd, Pontus (1943). Greklands krig 1940-1941. Skrifter / Militärlitteraturföreningens förlag, 99-0578882-4; 190 (in Swedish). Stockholm: Fören. [Norstedt]. SELIBR 1419921.
- Reuterswärd, Pontus (1939). Taktiska tillämpningsuppgifter för bataljon och regemente: med tillämpning av fältreglementets föreskrifter. Skrifter / Militärlitteraturföreningens förlag, 99-0578882-4; 183 (in Swedish). Stockholm. SELIBR 1373413.
- Reuterswärd, Pontus (1938). Några synpunkter på utbildningen i allmänhet och särskilt vid infanteriet (in Swedish). Stockholm: Hæggström. SELIBR 1375465.

Military offices
Preceded by Tell Schmidt	Skaraborg Regiment; 1922–1931	Succeeded by Carl Uggla
Preceded by Oscar Nygren	Commandant in Boden Fortress; 1930–1933	Succeeded by Gustaf Lagerfelt
Preceded by Oscar Nygren	Upper Norrland Troops; 1933–1937	Succeeded by Archibald Douglas
