= Henry Tottie =

Swedish Army officer (1888–1952)

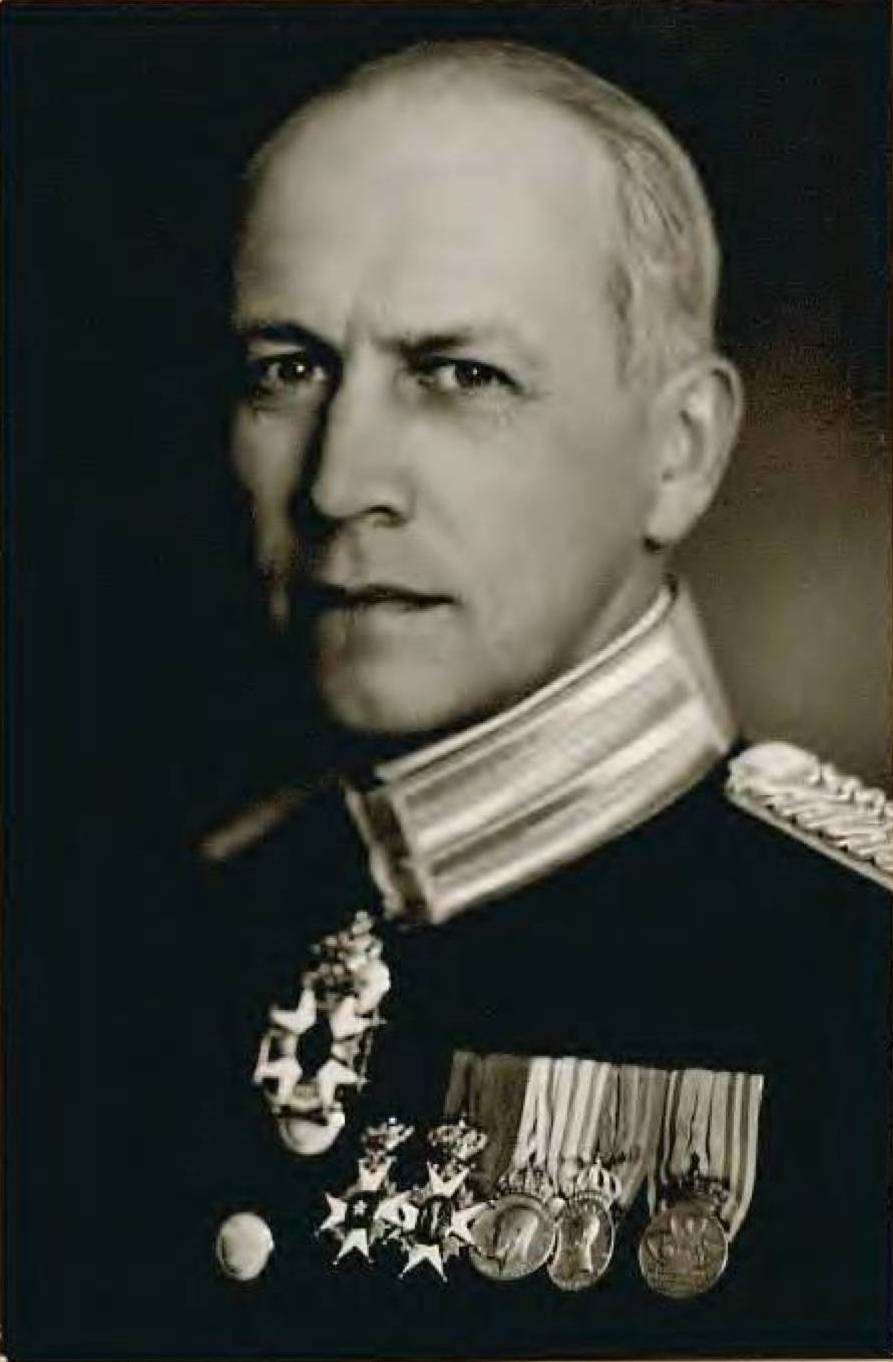
- Tottie as colonel
- Born: Carl Henry Tottie; 14 June 1888; Stockholm, Sweden
- Died: 2 May 1952 (aged 63); Stockholm, Sweden
- Burial place: Norra begravningsplatsen
- Military career
- Allegiance: Sweden
- Branch: Swedish Army
- Service years: 1909–1951
- Rank: Lieutenant general
- Commands: Military Office of the Land Defence; Svea Life Guards; Chief of the Army Staff; General Staff Corps; II Military District

Lieutenant General Carl Henry Tottie (14 June 1888 – 2 May 1952) was a Swedish Army officer. Tottie's senior commands include Executive Officer of Svea Life Guards, Chief of the Army Staff and the General Staff Corps and military commander of the II Military District.

== Early life ==
Tottie was born on 14 June 1888 in Hedvig Eleonora Parish, Stockholm, Sweden, the son of Colonel Charles Tottie and his wife Elisabeth Uggla. Tottie passed studentexamen in Gävle in 1907.

== Career ==
Tottie was graduated from Military Academy Karlberg in 1909 and was commissioned as an officer with the rank of Underlöjtnant the same year and was assigned to Bohuslän Regiment, where he was promoted to lieutenant in 1914. He served in the Topographic Department of the General Staff in 1915 and 1916, attended the Royal Swedish Army Staff College from 1916 to 1918, and was an aspirant in the General Staff from 1919 to 1921. Tottie was promoted to captain in 1921, and served in the staff of the 4th Army Division (IV. arméfördelningen) from 1921 and in Bohuslän Regiment from 1923. He served in Hälsinge Regiment from 1928 to 1930 and from 1930 to 1936, Tottie served again in the General Staff, among other thing as chief adjutant from 1931 to 1932, as head of the Organisation Department from 1932 to 1935 and again as chief adjutant from 1935 to 1936.

Tottie was promoted to major in 1931 and to lieutenant colonel in 1935. He was then assigned as Vice Chief of the Military Office of the Land Defence from 1935 to 1937, promoted to colonel in the General Staff Corps in 1937, and he served as Chief of the Military Office of the Land Defence from 1937 to 1938. Tottie was Executive Officer of Svea Life Guards from 1938 to 1942 and Acting Deputy Commander of the 2nd Army Division (II. arméfördelningen) from 1941 to 1942. He then served as Chief of the Army Staff and of the General Staff Corps from 1942 to 1943. He was also chairman of Sakkunniga rörande den andliga vården inom försvarsväsendet ("The Experts on Spiritual Care Within the Swedish Defence") from 1937 to 1938, chairman of the Centralrådet för religiös och kulturell verksamhet inom försvarsväsendet ("Central Council for Religious and Cultural Activities in the Swedish Defence") from 1939 to 1942 and chairman of the 1940 Military Social Welfare Committee. In 1943, he was promoted to major general and then he served as military commander of the II Military District 1943–1951. Tottie filed for dismissal because of a serious leg injury sustained in the service and transferred in 1951 as lieutenant general to the reserve.

== Death ==
Tottie died on 2 May 1952 in Oscar Parish, Stockholm. He was interred at Norra begravningsplatsen in Stockholm on 15 May 1952.

== Personal life ==
In 1922 he married Elsa Söderhielm (1897–1978), the daughter of Major General Erik Söderhielm and Signe Gadd.

== Dates of rank ==
- 1909 – Underlöjtnant
- 1914 – Lieutenant
- 1921 – Captain
- 1931 – Major
- 1935 – Lieutenant colonel
- 1937 – Colonel
- 1943 – Major general
- 1951 – Lieutenant general

== Awards and decorations ==
- (Sweden) Commander Grand Cross of the Order of the Sword (6 December 1950)
- (Sweden) Commander 1st Class of the Order of the Sword (5 June 1943)
- (Sweden) Commander 2nd Class of the Order of the Sword (6 June 1940)
- (Sweden) Knight 1st Class of the Order of the Sword (1930)
- (Sweden) Knight of the Order of the Polar Star (1936)
- (Sweden) Knight 1st Class of the Order of Vasa (1931)

== Honours ==
- Member of the Royal Swedish Academy of War Sciences (1935)

Military offices
Preceded by Ernst af Klercker	Military Office of the Land Defence; 1937–1938	Succeeded by Henry Kellgren
Preceded by Hugo Cederschiöld	Svea Life Guards; 1938–1942	Succeeded by Einar Björk
Preceded by Folke Högberg	Chief of the Army Staff General Staff Corps; 1942–1943	Succeeded by Hugo Gadd
Preceded by Helge Jung	II Military District; 1943–1951	Succeeded by Harald Hægermark
