= Henry Kellgren =

Swedish Army officer (1886–1954)

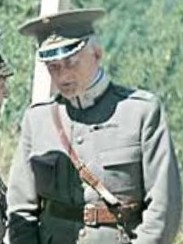
- Born: Per Henry Theodor Kellgren; 23 August 1886; Ljungarum, Sweden
- Died: 19 November 1954 (aged 68); Stockholm, Sweden
- Burial place: Eastern Cemetery, Gothenburg
- Military career
- Allegiance: Sweden
- Branch: Swedish Army
- Service years: 1908–1951
- Rank: Lieutenant general
- Commands: North Scanian Infantry Regiment; Military Office of the Land Defence; Military Office of the Minister of Defence

Lieutenant General Per Henry Theodor Kellgren (23 August 1886 – 19 November 1954) was a senior Swedish Army officer whose career spanned nearly five decades and brought him to some of the highest levels of Sweden's military establishment. Commissioned in 1908, he served in both regimental and staff positions and steadily rose through the ranks. After attending the Royal Swedish Army Staff College, he held several important appointments, including Chief of Staff of the Northern Division and the Infantry Inspectorate. In 1936, he became commanding officer of the North Scanian Infantry Regiment, and in 1938 he was appointed Chief of the Military Office of the Land Defence.

As Chief of the Military Office, Kellgren was responsible for maintaining Sweden's extensive contacts with foreign military attachés, particularly those from Germany, Britain, and the United States. Promoted to major general in 1942, he became increasingly influential within the defence establishment. When the command offices of the Army, Navy, and Air Force were merged in 1945, Kellgren was appointed their head and became the minister of defence's principal military adviser, exercising considerable influence over military appointments and promotions.

Kellgren's wartime contacts with the German military attaché, Bruno von Uthmann, later became the subject of considerable controversy. In 1945, Supreme Commander General Helge Jung sought to have him dismissed, regarding Kellgren as unfit for office and as part of an older, pro-German-oriented generation of Swedish officers. Kellgren defended his contacts with von Uthmann by stating that they had been conducted in accordance with instructions from the Swedish Ministries of Foreign Affairs and Defence. The government ultimately supported Kellgren, and an official 1946 publication, known as the Kellgren White Paper, was issued to document and defend his conduct.

After retiring from active military service, Kellgren remained active in public life. He served for three years as chairman of the Stockholm Trotting Association, where he played an important role in promoting international trotting events, including the Russian Gala meetings, an intercity match against Hamburg, and Solvalla's International Elite Race.

== Early life ==
Kellgren was born on 23 August 1886 at Stora Sanna manor in Ljungarum Parish, Jönköping County, Sweden the son of Patrik Anton Teodor Kellgren and his wife Emma Christina Eriksson. He was the nephew of the physiotherapist Henrik Kellgren (1837–1916). He passed mogenhetsexamen from Skara högre allmänna läroverk in Skara in 1906.

== Career ==
=== Military career ===
Kellgren was commissioned as a underlöjtnant in the 2nd Life Grenadier Regiment in 1908 and promoted to lieutenant in 1913. From 1917 to 1919, he attended the Royal Swedish Army Staff College, after which he served as an aspirant with the General Staff from 1919 to 1921. He was appointed captain in the General Staff in 1922 and served as adjutant to the Chief of the General Staff, Major General Carl Gustaf Hammarskjöld, from 1924 to 1926. In 1926, he became a captain in the Svea Life Guards, and in 1928 he returned to the General Staff.

Promoted to major in 1929, Kellgren served as Chief of Staff of the Northern Division (Norra fördelningen) from 1930 to 1932 and then as Chief of Staff of the Infantry Inspectorate (Infanteriinspektionen) from 1932 to 1935. He was promoted to lieutenant colonel in 1934 and appointed lieutenant colonel of the Halland Regiment the following year. In 1936, he was promoted to colonel and appointed commanding officer of the North Scanian Infantry Regiment. Two years later, in 1938, he became Chief of the Military Office of the Land Defence. In his capacity as Chief of the Military Office, Kellgren was responsible, among other things, for maintaining the extensive contacts with foreign military attachés, particularly those representing Germany, Britain, and the United States.

Kellgren was appointed to the Enlistment Council (Inskrivningsrådet) in 1942 and was promoted to major general in the Army that same year. In 1945, when the separate command offices of the Army, Navy, and Air Force were merged into a single organization, he was appointed its chief. In this position, Kellgren became the Minister of Defence's principal military adviser and wielded considerable influence, particularly over military appointments and promotions. His influence was also the subject of considerable criticism.

Kellgren wrote most of the 1946 publication issued by the Ministry for Foreign Affairs, Relations Between the Chief of the Military Office of the Land Defence and the German Military Attaché in Stockholm, 1939–1945. The publication presented Kellgren as one of the principal representatives of the willingness to cooperate with Germany that existed within parts of the Swedish government and the highest levels of the country's military leadership.

=== Kellgren affair ===
In November 1945, the Supreme Commander, General Helge Jung, asked Prime Minister Per Albin Hansson to dismiss Major General Henry Kellgren, Chief of the Military Office of the Land Defence. Jung regarded Kellgren as fundamentally unfit for his position and further suggested that compromising information about him might emerge once the German archives were opened. The Prime Minister refused the request, but Jung persisted. He found a new opportunity after learning that the Swedish National Defence Radio Establishment (FRA) had deciphered German telegrams containing information about contacts between Swedish officers and Nazi Germany. A substantial portion of the material concerned Kellgren's relationship with the German military attaché, Bruno von Uthmann.

The affair became a key element of Jung's personal campaign against older officers whom he believed to be pro-German. Neither the Prime Minister nor the Minister of Defence supported his demands, prompting Jung to approach Foreign Minister Östen Undén. He warned that the government could face accusations of passivity if it failed to act against Swedes who had served—or had been willing to serve—Hitler's interests. Undén took the warning seriously and demanded an explanation from Kellgren. In response, Kellgren produced a lengthy written defence, arguing that his contacts with von Uthmann had been conducted under instructions from the Ministries of Foreign Affairs and Defence, and that the German military attaché was an unreliable source of information. The government reviewed Kellgren's defence and gave it strong backing.

At the same time, ministers were concerned that the German telegrams, which contained pro-German statements by Swedish officers, could damage Sweden's reputation in the eyes of the victorious Allied powers. In notes from a briefing to the Crown Prince on 6 March 1946, Jung wrote that if the material became public—whether through foreign sources or the Swedish press—it would pose a serious foreign policy risk and undermine Sweden's standing, particularly in Britain and the United States. These discussions took place while the Rosenblad affair was at its height.

On 19 May 1946, the British weekly Reynold's News published an article titled "Swede Traitor Helped Nazis," attracting widespread attention in Sweden. Kellgren was identified as the officer described in the article, reigniting public debate over pro-German sympathies within the Swedish officer corps. The military leadership itself does not appear to have been responsible for the leak. Instead, the most likely source was Colonel Erland Mossberg, a retired officer and longtime rival of Kellgren, who believed that Kellgren had prevented his promotion to the rank of general. In response, the Swedish government decided to publish an official documentary report based largely on Kellgren's written defence. Foreign Minister Östen Undén personally supervised the preparation of what he referred to as the Kellgren White Paper, working closely with the Prime Minister and the Minister of Defence. The publication, Relations Between the Chief of the Military Office of the Land Defence and the German Military Attaché in Stockholm, 1939–1945, was released in early July 1946 and generated extensive editorial commentary throughout the Swedish press.

Because both former Foreign Minister Christian Günther and Defence Minister Per Edvin Sköld publicly supported Kellgren, the controversy came to encompass not only his conduct but also the Swedish government's wartime policy. The liberal press was the most critical, arguing that Sweden's foreign policy had been excessively accommodating toward Germany. Social Democratic newspapers were generally more restrained, while most conservative and Agrarian Party newspapers adopted a more sympathetic view, emphasizing Sweden's vulnerable strategic position and limited resources during the war. In effect, the government had sided with Kellgren in his conflict with Jung. The following year, the Meyerhöffer affair erupted, bringing another officer with documented pro-German sympathies under scrutiny as part of General Helge Jung's broader effort to purge pro-German elements from the Swedish officer corps.

=== Later life ===
After retiring from active military service, Kellgren served for three years as chairman of the Stockholm Trotting Association (Stockholms travsällskap). During his tenure, he was largely responsible for bringing the two Russian Gala meetings to Stockholm. He also initiated the idea of an intercity trotting match against Hamburg, as well as Solvalla's International Elite Race.

== Personal life ==
On 22 October 1912 in Norrköping, Kellgren married Adéle Alice Södergren (born 25 January 1888 in Stockholm), the daughter of factory manager Johan Fredrik Södergren and adopted daughter to his wife Emma Alma Augusta Lindquister. They divorced in 1923.

On 7 November 1927 in Copenhagen, Denmark, Kellgren married Gurli Boman (9 June 1898 in Gothenburg – 6 May 1984 in Stockholm), the daughter of physician Herman Boman and Elin Ekblom.

== Death ==
Henry Kellgren died on 19 November 1954 at Karolinska Hospital in Stockholm.

His funeral service was held on 26 November 1954 at the Northern Crematorium in Stockholm, officiated by the Court Chaplain Hans Åkerhielm. Among those in attendance were Foreign Minister Östen Undén and numerous senior military officers, including the Chief of the Army, Lieutenant General Carl August Ehrensvärd; the Chief of the Military Office of the Ministry of Defence, Major General Carl Årmann; the commander of the East Coast Naval District, Rear Admiral Erik Anderberg; as well as General Olof Thörnell, Major General Pehr Janse, Major General Sven Allstrin, and Lieutenant General Hjalmar Åström.

General Ehrensvärd delivered the Army's tribute, Major General Årmann spoke on behalf of the Military Office of the Ministry of Defence, and Professor Eric Åkerblom represented the Swedish trotting community.

The extensive floral tributes included wreaths from the Ministry of Defence, the Military Office of the Ministry of Defence, the Swedish general officer corps (generalitetet), the Chief of the Air Force, the officers' and non-commissioned officers' corps of the Life Grenadier Regiment, the officers' corps of the Halland Regiment and the North Scanian Infantry Regiment, the Stockholm Riding Club (Stockholms ryttarförbund), the Central Federation for Trotting (Centralförbundet för travsport), the Swedish Central Trotting Association (Svenska travsportens centralförbund), and numerous equestrian organizations from Sweden and neighboring countries. Wreaths were also sent by the British Service Attachés, the Service Attachés of the Canadian Legation, Skandinaviska Banken, Gotlandsbanken, Sällskapet, the Kamratföreningen Norra Skåningar veterans' association, and the Västgöta Gille society.

Kellgren was interred on 5 December 1954 in the family grave of his second wife at the Eastern Cemetery in Gothenburg.

== Dates of rank ==
- 31 December 1908 – Underlöjtnant
- 20 June 1913 – Lieutenant 2nd Class
- 26 September 1917 – Lieutenant 1st Class
- 28 April 1922 – Captain
- 17 October 1931 – Major
- 1 June 1934 – Lieutenant colonel
- 16 November 1936 – Colonel
- 1 July 1942 – Major general
- 20 September 1951 – Lieutenant general

== Awards and decorations ==
=== Swedish ===
- (Sweden) King Gustaf V's Jubilee Commemorative Medal (1948)
- (Sweden) King Gustaf V's Jubilee Commemorative Medal (1928)
- (Sweden) Commander Grand Cross of the Order of the Sword (4 June 1949)
- (Sweden) Commander 1st Class of the Order of the Sword (14 November 1942)
- (Sweden) Commander of the Order of the Sword (15 November 1939)
- (Sweden) Knight of the Order of the Sword (1929)
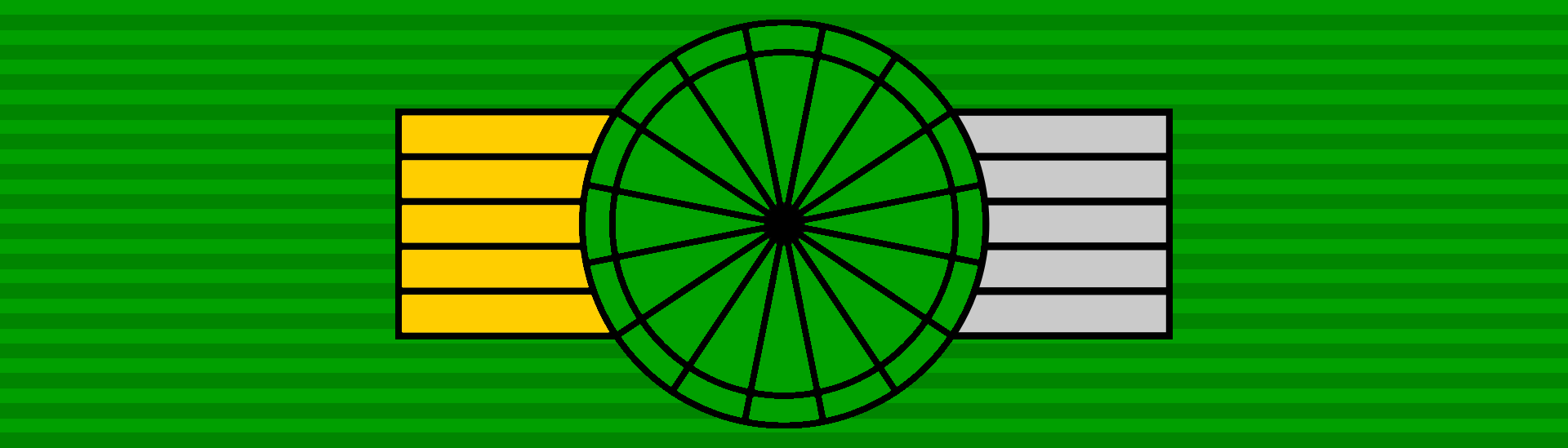
- (Sweden) Commander 1st Class of the Order of Vasa (6 June 1945)
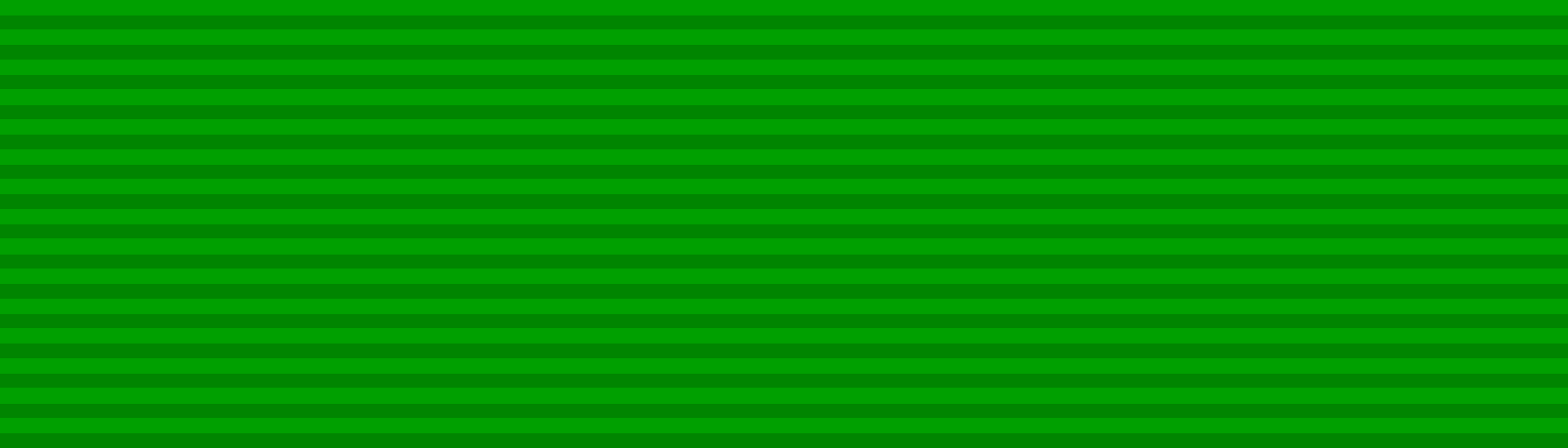
- (Sweden) Knight of the Order of Vasa (1935)
- (Sweden) National Air Protection Federation Merit Badge
- (Sweden) King Gustaf V's Olympic Commemorative Medal (Konung Gustaf V:s olympiska minnesmedalj)
- (Sweden) Swedish Voluntary Motor Transport Corps Merit Badge in silver
- (Sweden) Lingiad Anniversary Medal (Lingiadens jubileumsmedalj)
- (Sweden) Swedish Military Sports Association's Gold Medal (Sveriges militära idrottsförbunds guldmedalj)
- (Sweden) Landstormen Silver Medal (Landstormens silvermedalj)
- (Sweden) Gold Badge of Honour of the National Association of Swedish Militia Officers' Societies (Landstormsofficerssällskapens i Sverige Riksförbund hederstecken i guld)

=== Foreign ===
- (Kingdom of Italy) Grand Officer of the Order of the Crown of Italy
- (Netherlands) Grand Officer of the Order of Orange-Nassau
- Grand Officer of the Order of Merit of the Kingdom of Hungary
- (Finland) Order of the Cross of Liberty, 1st Class
- (Finland) Order of the Cross of Liberty, 2nd Class with swords
- (Denmark) Commander 1st Class of the Order of the Dannebrog
- Commander 1st Class of the Order of the White Rose of Finland
- (Norway) Commander with star of the Order of St. Olav
- (France) Commander of the Legion of Honour
- (Poland) Commander 2nd Class of the Order of Polonia Restituta
- (Nazi Germany) Order of the German Eagle 1st Class

== Honours ==
- Member of the Royal Swedish Academy of War Sciences (1938)

== Bibliography ==
- Kellgren, Henry (1951). Sex krigsår i Skölds skugga [Six years of war in the shadow of Sköld] (in Swedish). Stockholm: Saxon & Lindström. SELIBR 127825.
- Kellgren, Per Henry Teodor (1915). "Honny soit qui ma y pense": en samling tjänsteförteckningar ["Honny soit qui ma y pense": a collection of service lists] (in Swedish). Norrköping. SELIBR 2738287.
- Förbindelserna mellan chefen för Lantförsvarets kommandoexpedition och tyske militärattachén i Stockholm 1939-1945 [Relations Between the Chief of the Military Office of the Land Defence and the German Military Attaché in Stockholm, 1939–1945]. Aktstycken / utgivna av Kungl. Utrikesdepartementet (in Swedish). Stockholm: [Fritzes hovbokhandel] [distributör]. 1946. SELIBR 1398381.

Military offices
Preceded by Helge Jung	North Scanian Infantry Regiment; 1936–1938	Succeeded by Justus Holmgren
Preceded by Henry Tottie	Military Office of the Land Defence; 1938–1945	Succeeded by None
Preceded by None	Military Office of the Minister of Defence; 1945–1951	Succeeded by Carl Årmann
