= Carl Gustaf Hammarskjöld =

Swedish general and politician

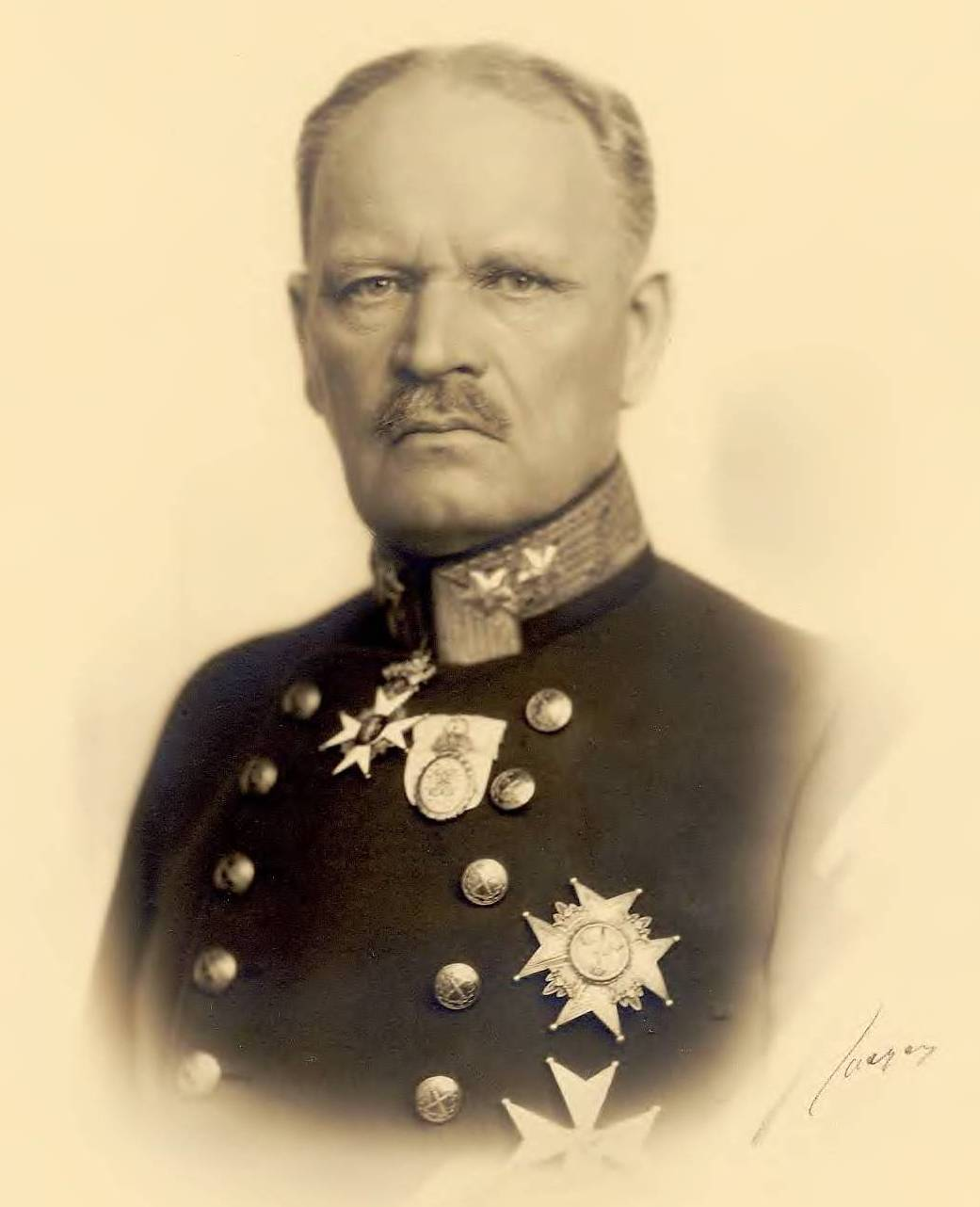

Minister of Defence
- In office 27 October 1920 – 6 June 1921
- Preceded by: Per Albin Hansson
- Succeeded by: Otto Lybeck

Personal details
- Born: Dag Hjalmar Agne Carl Hammarskjöld; 22 April 1865 Tuna, Sweden
- Died: 26 February 1940 (aged 74) Stockholm, Sweden
- Party: Lantmanna- och borgarpartiet
- Spouse: Dora Almgren
- Children: 2
- Occupation: Officer

Military service
- Branch/service: Swedish Army
- Years of service: 1885–1930
- Rank: General
- Commands: 1st Life Grenadier Regiment; 3rd Infantry Brigade; 6th Army Division; Chief of the General Staff

General Carl Gustaf Valdemar Hammarskjöld (22 April 1865 – 27 February 1940) was a Swedish Army officer and conservative politician.

== Early life ==
Hammarskjöld was born on 22 April 1865 at Väderum farm in Tuna Parish, Vimmerby Municipality, Sweden, the son of lieutenant Knut Hammarskjöld (1818–1891) and Wilhelmina Mimmi (née Cöster) (1832–1901). Carl Gustaf Hammarskjöld was brother to Hjalmar Hammarskjöld, cousin to Carl Hammarskjöld and Hugo Hammarskjöld, all of which were born in the same room, on the same farm, and became all (cabinet) ministers. Carl Gustaf was uncle to Dag Hammarskjöld.

== Career ==
Hammarskjöld was commissioned as an officer in Värmland Rifle Corps (Värmlands fältjägarkår, No 26) in 1885 with the rank of underlöjtnant. He was promoted to lieutenant in 1891 and served as a staff adjutant and lieutenant in the General Staff in 1895. Hammarskjöld was promoted to captain in the army and in the General Staff in 1899 and he served as a teacher at the Royal Swedish Army Staff College from 1899 to 1903. He then served as captain in Vaxholm Grenadier Regiment in 1903 and as a general staff officer in the staff of the 2nd Army Division (II. arméfördelningen) from 1903 to 1905. Hammarskjöld served as chief of staff in the 1st Army Division (I. arméfördelningen) from 1905 to 1906 then he was promoted to major in the General Staff and appointed vice chief of the Military Office of the Ministry of Land Defence. In 1910, Hammarskjöld was promoted to lieutenant colonel in the 1st Life Grenadier Regiment. Hammarskjöld was secretary in several military committees and assisted the General Staff in drafting proposals for a new conscript law in 1911 and experimental mobilization in 1912. He was promoted to colonel in the army in 1913.

In the Ministry of Land Defence from 1913 to 1914, he drafted a proposal for a new conscript law and a new army order. He was also an expert in the same ministry regarding commissariat equipment for the Landstorm. He then served as commander of the 1st Life Grenadier Regiment from 1914 and of the 3rd Infantry Brigade from 1 January 1917. Hammarskjöld was promoted to major general and appointed commanding officer of the 6th Army Division (VI. arméfördelningen) in 1919. In 1919, Hammarskjöld became a member of the Committee on Defense Audit (Försvarsrevisionen). Hammarskjöld served as Minister of Defence and head of the Ministry of Defence from 27 October 1920 to 6 June 1921. He then served eight years, from 1922 to 1930 as Chief of the General Staff. He was promoted to lieutenant general in 1926 and to full general then he retired from the military in 1930. Hammarskjöld transferred to the reserve and remained there until 1937.

Hammarskjöld was a member of Andra kammaren 1918 to 1920, and of the Första kammaren from 1924 to 1932, representing Farmer and Bourgeoisie Party.

== Personal life ==
On the 28 November 1903 he married Dora Albertina Almgren (11 October 1876 – 30 November 1956), the daughter of Chief Director of the Swedish State Railways, Fredrik August Almgren and Johanna Charlotta Wasenius. They had two children, Carl (born 1904) and Bengt (born 1905).

== Death ==
Hammarskjöld died on 27 February 1940 in Hedvig Eleonora Parish, Stockholm. He was buried on 2 March 1940 in Norra begravningsplatsen, Solna Municipality.

== Dates of rank ==
- 1884 – Sergeant
- 30 October 1885 – Underlöjtnant
- 6 August 1891 – Lieutenant
- 7 April 1899 – Captain
- 16 February 1906 – Major
- 12 June 1909 – Lieutenant Colonel
- 14 February 1913 – Colonel
- 14 July 1919 – Major General
- 23 April 1926 – Lieutenant General
- 23 April 1930 – General

== Awards and decorations ==
=== Swedish ===
- (Sweden) King Gustaf V's Jubilee Commemorative Medal (1928)
- (Sweden) Commander Grand Cross of the Order of the Sword (6 June 1926)
- (Sweden) Commander 1st Class of the Order of the Sword (6 June 1919)
- (Sweden) Commander of the 2nd Class of the Order of the Sword (6 June 1916)
- (Sweden) Knight 1st Class of the Order of the Sword (1905)
- (Sweden) Commander 1st Class of the Order of the Polar Star (6 December 1923)
- (Sweden) Knight of the Order of the Polar Star (1912)
- (Sweden) Commander 2nd Class of the Order of Vasa (30 September 1914)

=== Foreign ===
- Grand Cross of the Order of the White Rose of Finland (1925)
- (Russian Empire) Knight 2nd Class of the Order of St. Anna (1909)
- (Denmark) Knight of the Order of the Dannebrog (11 September 1906)
- (Kingdom of Prussia) Knight 3rd Class of the Order of the Red Eagle (1908)

== Honours ==
- Member of the Royal Swedish Academy of War Sciences (1907) and President (1931–1933).

Government offices
Preceded by Per Albin Hansson	Minister of Defence; 1920–1921	Succeeded by Otto Lybeck
Preceded by Ernst Herman Daniel Vilhelm von Bornstedt	1st Life Grenadier Regiment; 1914–1916	Succeeded by Kunt Otto Hjalmar Säfwenberg
Preceded by Erik Bergström	6th Army Division; 1918–1922	Succeeded by Georg Nyström
Preceded by Lars Tingsten	Chief of the General Staff; 1922–1930	Succeeded by Bo Boustedt
Academic offices
Preceded by Bror Munck	President of the Royal Swedish Academy of War Sciences; 1931–1933	Succeeded by Fredrik Riben
