= Erik Testrup =

Swedish Army officer (1878–1972)

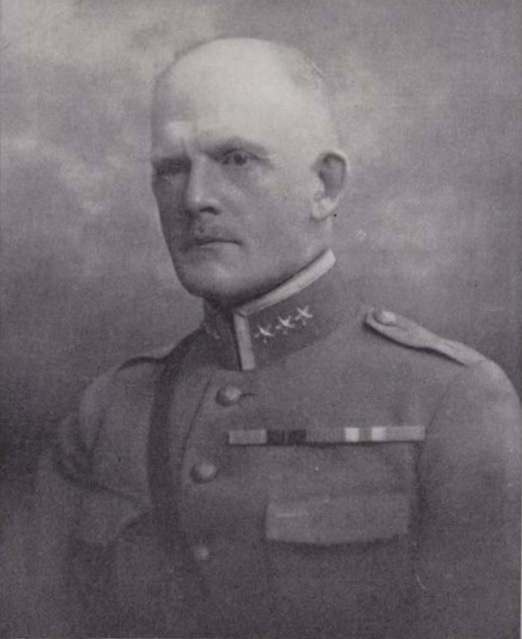
- Born: Erik Mathias Hjalmar Gustafsson Testrup; 14 September 1878; Landskrona, Sweden
- Died: 18 December 1972 (aged 94); Stockholm, Sweden
- Military career
- Allegiance: Sweden
- Branch: Swedish Army
- Service years: 1898–1943
- Rank: Lieutenant General
- Commands: Royal Swedish Army Staff College; North Scanian Infantry Regiment; Military Office of the Land Defence; Eastern Army Division; IV Army Division; Commandant General of Stockholm Garrison; IV Military District

Lieutenant General Erik Mathias Hjalmar Gustafsson Testrup (14 September 1878 – 18 December 1972) was a Swedish Army officer. His senior commands include commanding officer of the Eastern Army Division of the IV Army Division, Commandant General of Stockholm Garrison and as military commander of the IV Military District.

== Early life ==
Testrup was born on 14 September 1878 in Landskrona, Sweden, the son of lieutenant colonel Gustav Testrup and his wife Mathilda Gerlin.

== Career ==
=== Military career ===
He was commissioned as an officer in Kronoberg Regiment in 1898 with the rank of underlöjtnant. Testrup was promoted to lieutenant in 1902 and attended the Royal Swedish Army Staff College from 1904 to 1906. He then served in the General Staff in 1910 and he was promoted to captain in 1912. Testrup served as a teacher at the Royal Swedish Army Staff College from 1914 to 1915 and at the Royal Swedish Naval Staff College from 1915 to 1919. In 1917, he made a study trip to the German Western Front and served in the Göta Life Guards from 1917 to 1919, when he was promoted to major and served in the General Staff.

In 1922, Testrup was promoted to lieutenant colonel and appointed head of the Royal Swedish Army Staff College. In 1925, he made a study trip to the Netherlands and to England (and to Finland in 1930) and the year after he was promoted to colonel and was appointed regimental commander of the North Scanian Infantry Regiment. Testrup was then commanding officer of the Military Office of the Land Defence from 1929 to 1932 and brigade commander in the Western Army Division from 1932 to 1936. He was promoted to major general in the army in 1934 and in 1936 he was appointed commanding officer of the Eastern Army Division and Commandant General of Stockholm Garrison.

In 1937, Testrup was appointed commanding officer of the IV Army Division. During this time he continued serving as Commandant General of Stockholm Garrison. In 1939, he visited the field service exercises on the Karelian Isthmus. He was appointed military commander of the IV Military District in 1942 and in 1943 Testrup retired from active service and was at the same time promoted to lieutenant general.

=== Other work ===
Testrup was an expert on the army's providing with technical equipment from 1917 to 1918, on the training of certain technical officers from 1918 to 1921, secretary for the army in the Försvarsrevisionen from 1919 to 1923 and secretary of the General Commission (Generalkommissionen) in 1923. He was at the disposal of the Ministry of Defence for drafting a new army regulation from 1923 to 1924, secretary of the Land Defense (Lantförsvaret) in the Riksdag's Special Committee in 1924, and was an expert on the infantry exercise regulations and field service regulations from 1926 to 1927. In 1929, Testrup became a Riksdag's Upper House for The Right in 1929.

Testrup was chairman of the military association KHS from 1924 to 1926, of the Norra skånska landstormsförbundet ("North Scanian Landstorm Association") from 1927 to 1930, of the Föreningen för befrämjandet av skolungdomens vapenövningar ("Association for the Promotion of Weapon Exercises for Students") from 1937 to 1947, of the Stockholm district of Militär Idrott from 1937 to 1943, of the Stockholm district of the Swedish Red Cross from 1943 to 1954 and of the General Commission for Voluntary Health Care in War from 1944. He was also vice chairman of Bönnelyche & Thuröe AB from 1947 to 1959 and a member of the Executive Board of the H.M. Konungens Militärhospitals- och Medaljfonder from 1947 to 1964.

== Personal life ==
In 1904, he married Ebba Thuröe (1883–1963), the daughter of Lauritz Thuröe and Christine Bönnelyche.

== Death ==
Testrup died on 18 December 1972. He was buried on 26 January 1973 in the Old Cemetery in Strängnäs in the same grave as his parents and his wife.

== Dates of rank ==
- 1898 – Underlöjtnant
- 1902 – Lieutenant
- 1912 – Captain
- 1919 – Major
- 1922 – Lieutenant colonel
- 1926 – Colonel
- 1934 – Major general
- 1943 – Lieutenant general

== Awards and decorations ==
=== Swedish ===
- (Sweden) King Gustaf V's Jubilee Commemorative Medal (1948)
- (Sweden) Commander Grand Cross of the Order of the Sword (6 June 1941)
- (Sweden) Commander 1st Class of the Order of the Sword (22 November 1932)
- (Sweden) Commander 2nd Class of the Order of the Sword (6 June 1930)
- (Sweden) Knight 1st Class of the Order of the Sword (1919)
- (Sweden) Commander 1st Class of the Order of Vasa (16 June 1933)
- (Sweden) Knight 1st Class of the Order of Vasa (1916)
- (Sweden) Knight of the Order of the Polar Star (1923)
- (Sweden) Federation of Landstorm Associations Medal of Merit in gold
- (Sweden) Lingiadens jubileumsmedalj ("Ligiad Commemorative Medal")
- (Sweden) Landstormsofficerarnas riksförbunds hederstecken i guld ("Federation of Landstorm Associations Badge of Honor in Gold")
- (Sweden) Swedish Red Cross' Silver Medal
- (Sweden) SthlmsIfbGM
- (Sweden) Central Board of the National Swedish Rifle Association's Silver Medal (Sveriges skytteförbunds överstyrelses silvermedalj)
- (Sweden) Föreningen för befrämjande av skolungdomens vapenövningars guldmedalj ("Association for the Promotion of Weapon Exercises for Students' Gold Medal")

=== Foreign ===
- (Estonia) 2nd Class of the Order of the Cross of the Eagle (between 1931 and 1935)
- Commander 1st Class of the Order of the White Rose of Finland (between 1931 and 1935)
- Commander 2nd Class of the Order of the White Rose of Finland (between 1925 and 1928)
- Knight 1st Class of the Order of the White Rose of Finland (between 1918 and 1921)
- (Nazi Germany) Order of the German Eagle with Star (1942)
- (Denmark) Commander 2nd Class of the Order of the Dannebrog (between 1931 and 1935)
- (Netherlands) Commander of the Order of Orange-Nassau with Swords (between 1925 and 1928)
- (Norway) Commander of the Order of St. Olav (between 1925 and 1928)
- (Poland) Commander 2nd Class of the Order of Polonia Restituta (between 1931 and 1935)
- (France) Officer of the Legion of Honour (between 1931 and 1935)
- (Italy) Knight of the Order of Saints Maurice and Lazarus (between 1909 and 1915)
- (Finland) White Guard's Cross of Merit
- (Finland) Finnish Red Cross' Cross of Honor
- (Finland) Finnish commemorative medal for humanitarian activities
- (France) French Red Cross's Gold Medal
- (German Empire) German Red Cross' Badge of Honor

== Honours ==
- Member of the Royal Swedish Academy of War Sciences (1924), its president 1943–1945
- Member of the Royal Patriotic Society
- Member of the Royal Swedish Pro Patria Society
- Member of the Idun Society (Sällskapet Idun)
- Member of the Arla Coldinu Orden, its president 1939–1956

Military offices
Preceded by Hugo Wikner	Royal Swedish Army Staff College; 1922–1926	Succeeded by Harald Malmberg
Preceded by Robert Marks von Wurtemberg	North Scanian Infantry Regiment; 1926–1929	Succeeded by Martin Hanngren
Preceded by Bo Boustedt	Military Office of the Land Defence; 1929–1932	Succeeded by Torsten Friis
Preceded by Gösta Lilliehöök	Eastern Army Division; 1936–1936	Succeeded by None
Preceded by None	Eastern Army Division; 1937–1942	Succeeded by None
Preceded by Gösta Lilliehöök	Commandant General of Stockholm Garrison; 1936–1943	Succeeded by Helge Jung
Preceded by None	IV Military District; 1942–1943	Succeeded by Helge Jung
Professional and academic associations
Preceded by Lennart Lilliehöök	President of the Royal Swedish Academy of War Sciences; 1943–1945	Succeeded by Archibald Douglas
