= Ernst af Klercker =

Swedish Army officer (1881–1955)

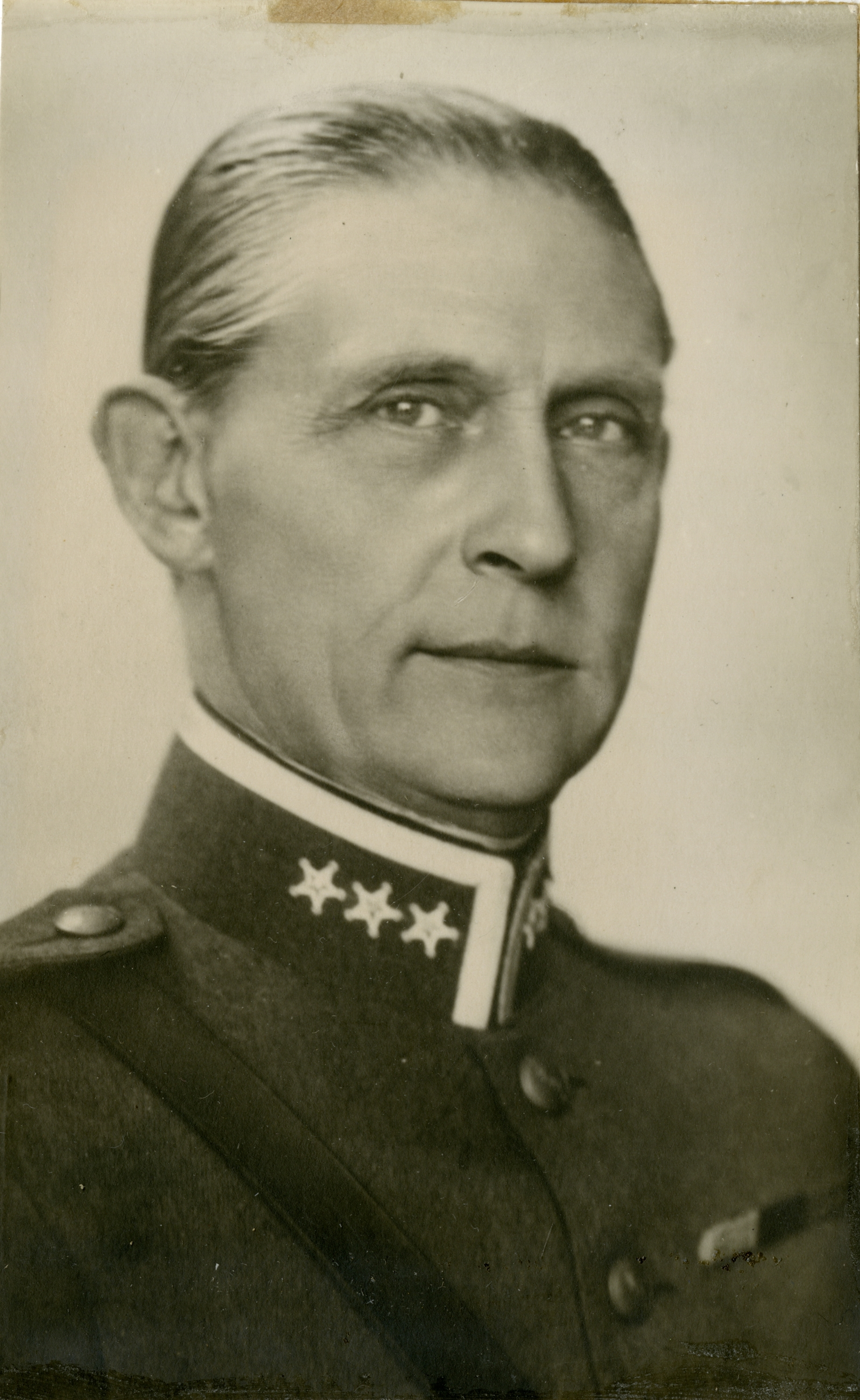
- af Klercker as colonel (1932–1937).
- Born: Achates Ernst Wilhelm af Klercker; 28 December 1881; Kristianstad, Sweden
- Died: 18 May 1955 (aged 73); Helsingborg, Sweden
- Relatives: Georg af Klercker (brother)
- Military career
- Allegiance: Sweden
- Branch: Swedish Army
- Service years: 1902–1947
- Rank: Lieutenant General
- Nickname: Dess Gentleman (Note: af Klercker's nom de guerre among the cadets at the Military Academy Karlberg was Dess Gentleman ("Its Gentleman"), an allusion to "Its White Lustschloss" which the Military Academy sometimes was called by the cadets.)
- Commands: Infantry Officer School; Military Academy Karlberg; Hälsinge Regiment; Military Office of the Land Defence; Chief of the Army Staff; 1st Army Division; I Military District

Lieutenant General Achates Ernst Wilhelm af Klercker (28 December 1881 – 18 May 1955) was a senior Swedish Army officer. His senior commands include postings as chief of the Military Office of the Land Defence and Acting Chief of the Army Staff. He commanded the 1st Army Division and the I Military District during World War II.

== Early life ==
af Klercker was born on 28 December 1881 in Kristianstads Heliga Trefaldighet Parish, Kristianstad County, Sweden, as the youngest of seven brothers (including Georg af Klercker), of Major Fredrik af Klercker and Baroness Lotten Bennet.

== Career ==
af Klercker was commissioned as an officer in 1902 and assigned to the 2nd Life Grenadier Regiment as underlöjtnant. He passed the Royal Swedish Army Staff College from 1909 to 1911, and was appointed, after officer candidate service, Captain of the General Staff in 1916. af Klercker was a teacher of tactics at the Royal Swedish Army Staff College from 1917 to 1918, and he was promoted to major in 1923.

af Klercker was again serving as a teacher of tactics at the Royal Swedish Army Staff College from 1923 to 1926, and as Chief of Staff at the Inspector of the Military Academy (Inspektören för Militärläroverken) from 1923 to 1926. As head of the general staff's International Department from 1926 to 1930, he studied certain military conditions abroad. af Klercker was promoted to lieutenant colonel in 1928 and served as head of the Military Academy Karlberg from 1930 to 1933 and was promoted to colonel in 1932.

af Klercker was regimental commander of Hälsinge Regiment from 1933 to 1934 and chief of the Military Office of the Land Defence from 1934 to 1936 as well as acting chief of the Army Staff from 1936 to 1937 when he was promoted to major general. He was then commanding officer of the 1st Army Division (I. arméfördelningen) from 1937 to 1942 and of the I Military District from 1942 to 1947. af Klercker was promoted to lieutenant general in the reserve of the general staff on 1 March 1947 and left active service on 1 April 1947.

== Personal life ==
On 12 October 1907 in Hakarp, Jönköping he married Anna Ingegerd Maria Tham (10 April 1887 in Hakarp – 16 November 1963 in Helsingborg), the daughter of Gustaf Wilhelm Sebastian Tham and Julia Elisabet Louise Reuterskiöld.

== Dates of rank ==
af Klercker's dates of rank:

- 12 December 1902 – Underlöjtnant
- 2 February 1906 – Lieutenant
- 3 November 1911 – Lieutenant 1st class
- 14 June 1916 – Captain
- 11 May 1923 – Major
- 3 June 1927 – Lieutenant colonel
- 11 November 1932 – Colonel
- 19 March 1937 – Major general
- 1 March 1947 – Lieutenant general

== Awards and decorations ==
=== Swedish ===
- (Sweden) Commander Grand Cross of the Order of the Sword (15 November 1944)
- (Sweden) Commander First Class of the Order of the Sword (5 June 1937)
- (Sweden) Knight First Class of the Order of the Sword (1923)
- (Sweden) Knight of the Order of the Polar Star (1933)
- (Sweden) Knight First Class of the Order of Vasa (1927)

=== Foreign ===
- (Denmark) Grand Cross of the Order of the Dannebrog (between 1947 and 1950)
- (Denmark) Knight of the Order of the Dannebrog (between 1925 and 1928)
- (Nazi Germany) Order of the German Eagle with Star (between 1940 and 1942)
- (Belgium) Commander of the Order of the Crown (between 1935 and 1940)
- Commander Second Class of the Order of the White Rose of Finland (between 1925 and 1928)
- (France) Commander of the Legion of Honour (between 1935 and 1940)
- Commander of the Order of the Crown of Italy (between 1928 and 1931)
- (Netherlands) Commander of the Order of Orange-Nassau with Swords (between 1928 and 1931)
- (Poland) Commander Second Class of the Order of Polonia Restituta (between 1935 and 1940)
- (Spain) Commander Second Class with White Decoration of the Order of Military Merit (between 1928 and 1931)
- Commander of the Decoration of Honour for Services to the Republic of Austria (between 1935 and 1940)
- (Norway) Knight First Class of the Order of St. Olav (between 1928 and 1931)

== Honours ==
- Member of the Royal Swedish Academy of War Sciences (1927)

== Bibliography ==
- Klercker, Ernst af (1919). Order: handledning för avfattande av order i fält med applikatoriska exempel jämte hänvisningar till vederbörliga reglementen (in Swedish). Stockholm: Förf. SELIBR 1654341.

== Footnote ==
Military offices
Preceded by Carl Uggla	Military Academy Karlberg; 1930–1933	Succeeded by Manne Brandel
Preceded by Torsten Friis	Military Office of the Land Defence; 1934–1936	Succeeded by Henry Tottie
Preceded by None	Chief of the Army Staff; 1937–1941	Succeeded by Helge Jung
Preceded by Per Sylvan	1st Army Division; 1937–1941	Succeeded by None
Preceded by None	I Military District; 1942–1947	Succeeded by Carl August Ehrensvärd
