= Gösta Lilliehöök (1871–1952) =

Swedish Army officer

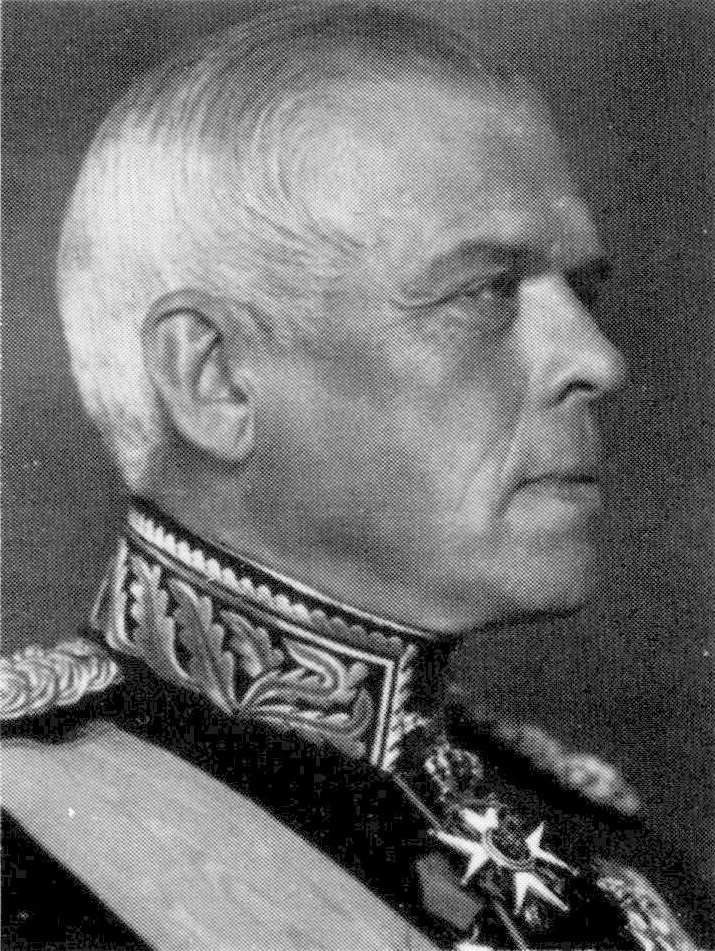
- Born: 19 September 1871; Ovansjö, Sweden
- Died: 22 November 1952 (aged 81); Stockholm, Sweden
- Military career
- Allegiance: Sweden
- Branch: Swedish Army
- Service years: 1891–1936
- Rank: Lieutenant General
- Commands: Royal Swedish Army Staff College; Jämtland Ranger Regiment; 1st Infantry Brigade; Upper Norrland's Troops; Eastern Army Division; Commandant General of Stockholm Garrison

Lieutenant General Gösta Lilliehöök (19 September 1871 – 22 November 1952) was a Swedish Army officer. His senior commands include commanding officer of the 1st Infantry Brigade, military commander of Upper Norrland and of the Eastern Army Division as well as Commandant General of Stockholm Garrison.

== Early life ==
Lilliehöök was born on 19 September 1871 in Ovansjö, Gävleborg County, Sweden, the son of major Gustaf "Gösta" Lilliehöök and his wife Gunilla Wærn. He was the brother of colonel Bertil Lilliehöök (1870–1967) and lieutenant general Lennart Lilliehöök (1872–1950).

== Career ==
=== Military career ===
He was commissioned as an officer in Hälsinge Regiment in 1891 with the rank of underlöjtnant. Lilliehöök transferred to Svea Life Guards in 1892 where he was promoted to lieutenant in 1896. He became captain in the General Staff in 1904 and in the Svea Life Guards in 1905 and in the Norrbotten Regiment in 1909. He was a teacher of tactics at the Royal Swedish Army Staff College from 1905 to 1910 and acting chief of staff at the military commander on Gotland from 1906 to 1909. In 1909, Lilliehöök conducted military studies in Germany. He became major in the General Staff in 1912 and served as senior adjutant and lieutenant colonel in the General Staff in 1915 and as staff officer in the Infantry Inspectorate (Infanteriinspektionen) the same year.

In 1915, Lilliehöök was appointed head of the Royal Swedish Army Staff College and two years later, in 1917, he was promoted to colonel in the General Staff and appointed regimental commander of the Jämtland Ranger Regiment. From April to May 1917, Lilliehöök conducted military studies at the Carpathian Front in Austria. In 1921, Lilliehöök joined the Norwegian Army and in 1928 he was promoted to major general in the Swedish Army and appointed military commander of Upper Norrland's Troops. He conducted military studies in Finland in 1929 and in 1930 he was appointed commanding officer of the Eastern Army Division (Östra arméfördelningen) and Commandant General of Stockholm Garrison. In 1934 he was promoted to lieutenant general and he conducted military studies in Northern Norway in 1935. Lilliehöök retired in 1936. Four years later, Lilliehöök again served as Commandant General of Stockholm Garrison but only for a few months, from April to December 1940.

=== Other work ===
As a young officer, Lilliehöök was already interested in the military skiing, Lilliehöök became one of the pioneers of this branch of training and was one of the foremost Swedish authorities in the field of winter field service. He also promoted the voluntary shooting movement and was chairman of the central board of the Rifle Association of Sweden (Sveriges skytteförbunds överstyrelse) from 1934 to 1943. He was chairman of the Jämtland County Ski Runner Association (Jämtlands läns skidlöpareförbund) from 1918 to 1928, and of the Swedish Lapland Mountain Men's Club (De lappländska fjällkarlarnas klubb) from 1929 to 1945 and in the Swedish Mountaineering Club (Svenska fjällklubben) from 1938 to 1944. In 1931 he became King in Council's delegate in the central board of the Swedish Sports Confederation. In AB Tipstjänst, he was King in Council's representative from the beginning of the company's operations from 1934 to 1941 and chairman of its working committee from 1934 to 1943.

Lilliehöök was also chairman of Sagokonst AB, AB Industricentralen and the Svenska draghundklubben.

== Personal life ==
Lilliehöök married for the first time on 24 September 1901 in Hedvig Eleonora Parish, Stockholm, to Gerda Eva Anna Helena Gabriella Hansson (13 September 1872 in Stockholm – 12 May 1927 in Östersund), the daughter of the wholesaler Lars Peter Hansson and Sofia Josefina Lagercrantz. They had three children, Sigrid (born 1900), Gösta G:son (born 1903) and Gunilla (born 1907).

He married for the second time on 18 July 1929 in Misterhult, Kalmar County, to Irma Maria Pagel (12 October 1894 in Stockholm – 29 September 1972 in Stockholm), the daughter of the wholesaler Axel Julius Pettersson Pagel and Alida Maria Edberg. They had one son, Axel G:son (born 1930).

== Death ==
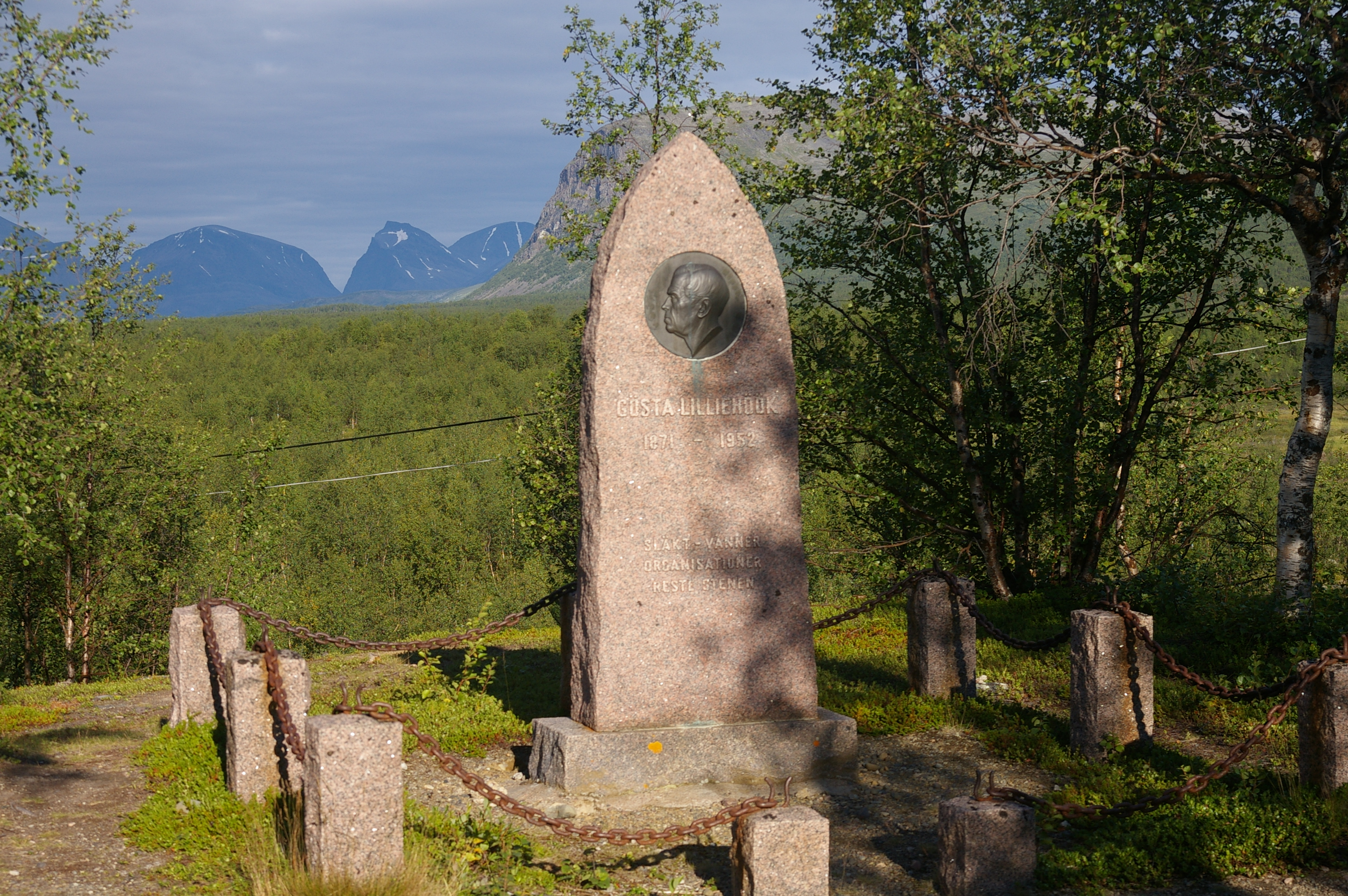
The gravestone in Nikkaluokta with the Kebnekaise massif and Tolpagorni in the background.

Lilliehöök died on 22 November 1952 in Bromma Parish, Stockholm. In the mid-1950s, his remains were transferred to Nikkaluokta Chapel in Nikkaluokta where he was buried. The chapel where Lilliehöök is buried next to, was built as an initiative of the Swedish Lapland Mountain Men's Club (De lappländska fjällkarlarnas klubb), of which Lilliehöök was a long-time chairman.

== Dates of rank ==
- 1891 – Underlöjtnant
- 1896 – Lieutenant
- 1904 – Captain
- 1912 – Major
- 1915 – Lieutenant colonel
- 1917 – Colonel
- 1928 – Major general
- 1934 – Lieutenant general

== Awards and decorations ==
=== Swedish ===
- (Sweden) Commander Grand Cross of the Order of the Sword (6 June 1935)
- (Sweden) Knight of the Order of the Polar Star (1918)
- (Sweden) Knight of the Order of Vasa (1914)
- (Sweden) Shooting Gold Medal
- (Sweden) Shooting Plaque
- (Sweden) Landstormen's Silver Medal (LandstSM)
- (Sweden) Swedish Military Sports Association's gold medal (Sveriges militära idrottsförbunds guldmedalj)
- (Sweden) CfifGM
- (Sweden) Swedish Gymnastic and Sports Clubs' Association's gold medal (Svenska gymnastik- och idrottsföreningarnas riksförbunds guldmedalj)
- (Sweden) Jämtland County Rifle Association's gold medal (Jämtlands läns skytteförbunds guldmedalj)
- (Sweden) Iron Medal of the Association for Ski Promotion (Skidfrämjandets järnmedalj)

=== Foreign ===
- Commander First Class of the Order of the White Rose of Finland
- (Norway) Commander Second Class of the Order of St. Olav
- (France) Officer of the Legion of Honour
- (Denmark) Grand Commander of the Order of the Dannebrog
- (Poland) Commander Grand Cross of the Order of Polonia Restituta
- (Belgium) Commander Grand Cross of the Order of the Crown
- (Denmark) Danish Sports Gold Medal (Dansk idrottsguldmedalj)

== Honours ==
- Member of the Royal Swedish Academy of War Sciences (1914)

== Filmography ==
- I gult och blått (1942)
- Talarfilm Gösta Lilliehöök och Sixtus Jansson (1940)

Military offices
Preceded by None	Upper Norrland's Troops; 1928–1930	Succeeded by Oscar Nygren
Preceded by Bo Boustedt	Eastern Army Division; 1930–1936	Succeeded by None
Preceded by Bo Boustedt	Commandant General of Stockholm Garrison; 23 April 1930–1936	Succeeded by Erik Testrup
Preceded by Erik Testrup	Commandant General of Stockholm Garrison; April 1940–December 1940	Succeeded by Erik Testrup
