= Military Office of the Land Defence =

The Military Office of the Land Defence (Swedish: Lantförsvarets kommandoexpedition), from 1840 to 1922 called the Military Office of the Ministry of Land Defence (Swedish: Lantförsvarsdepartementets kommandoexpedition), was an office in the Royal Chancery from 1840 to 1945, where all so-called ‘military command matters’ were handled and from where these accompanying dispatches (including general orders) were issued. In 1945, it was amalgamated into the Military Office of the Minister of Defence.

== History ==
The Military Office of the Ministry of Land Defence traces its origins to the Office of Adjutant General (Generaladjutantsämbetet), which in connection with the departmental reforms of 1840 ceased. The Ministry of Land Defence and the Ministry for Naval Affairs were established, where – as far as the army is concerned – so-called command matters came to be handled within the ministry's military office (from 1922 called the Military Office of the Land Defence). The command matters were the matters of usually less importance which were decided by the king in his capacity as Supreme Commander of the Swedish Armed Forces on land. These mainly concerned the army's weapons exercises, schools, training, personnel accounting, service conditions, etc.

According to the 1925 Land Defence Army Order, the personnel at the Military Office of the Land Defence consist of:

- 1 chief, regimental officer with fees from the Ministry of Defence;
- 1 vice chief, regimental officer of the General Staff;
- 3 captains from the General Staff;
- 7 retired officers with fees from the Ministry of Defence;
- 2 active company officers, ordered from the troop units;
- 2 retired non-commissioned officers as office non-commissioned officers with fees from the Ministry of Defence; and
- 1 office guard with a salary from the Ministry of Defence
- In addition, three aspirants in the General Staff were generally ordered to serve in the Military Office.

Command matters, in which they concerned the land defence, were mainly matters concerning the establishment of the exercise and service regulations as well as instructions for the training and exercises of the personnel; selection and distribution of conscripts for service; mobilization regulations; determination of models and testing of new equipment and materiel; drafting and placement of officers for service and extra functions; as well as certain applications for leave of absence and permission to stay abroad, etc. The mobilization and weapons exercise details are each handled by a company officer from the General Staff as well as other details of retired officers with fees from the ministry's state. For the handling of cases, the Military Office was according to the Defence Act of 1925 organized in eight special offices, namely the Registrar Office (Registratorsdetaljen), the List Office (Rulldetaljen), the Mobilization Office (Mobiliseringsdetaljen), the Weapons Exercise Office (Vapenövningsdetaljen), the Personnel Office (Personaldetaljen), the Conscription Office (Värnpliktsdetaljen) and the Book Office (Bokdetaljen) detail and the Office for the Service Announcements Concerning the Land Defence (Tjänstemeddelanden rörande lantförsvaret, T.-L.-detaljen). The Mobilization and Weapons Exercise Offices are each handled by a company officer from the General Staff as well as other offices by retired officers with fees from the Ministry of Defence.

On 1 July 1945, the Military Office of the Land Defence was amalgamated into the Military Office of the Minister of Defence.

== Location ==
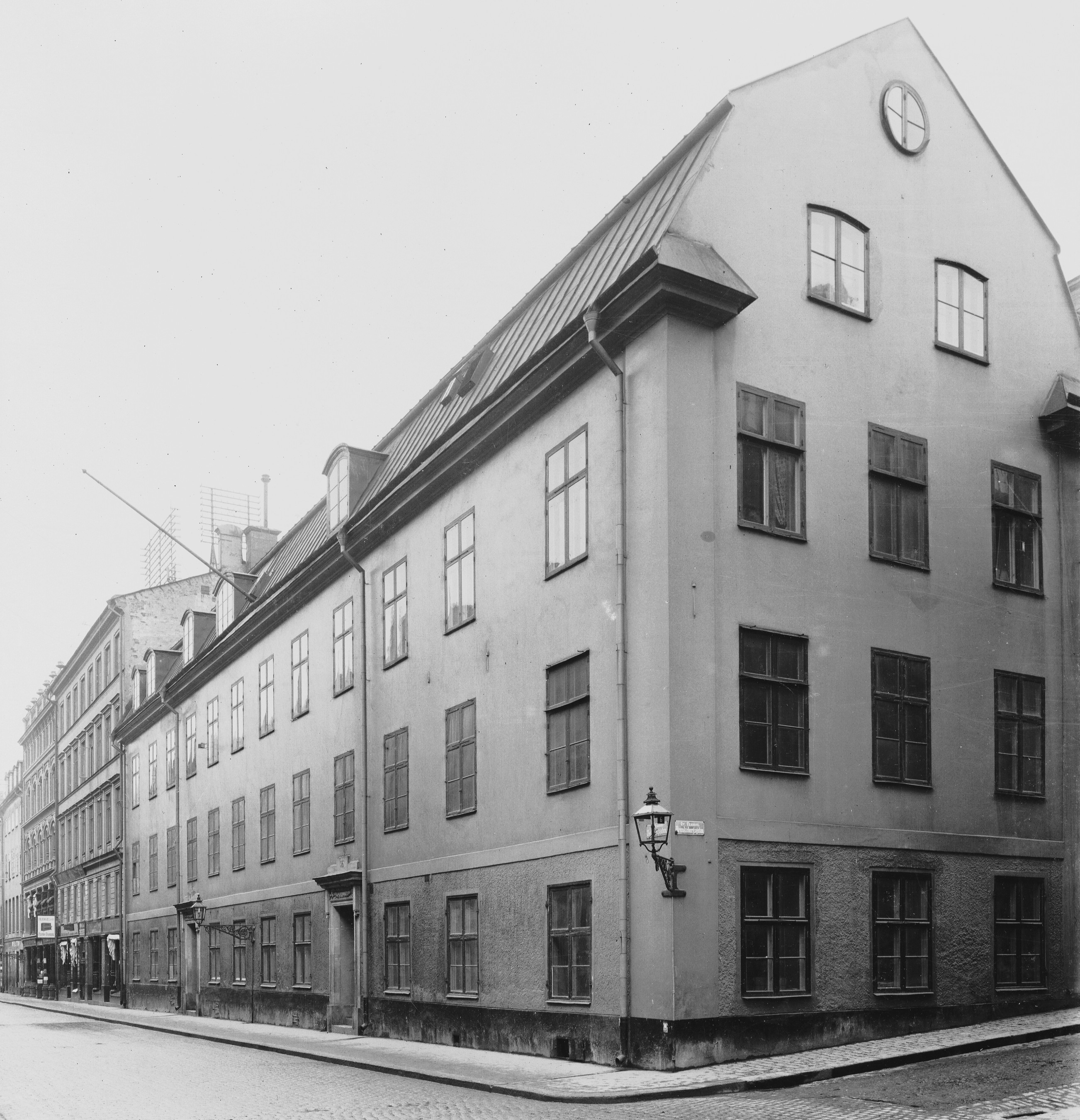
Preisiska huset on Drottninggatan.

The Ministry of Land Defence, like the Ministry for Naval Affairs, had its premises in the Stenbockska palatset at Birger Jarls torg 4, during the years 1840–1851. During this time, however, the Military Office was located in the so-called Preisiska huset on Drottninggatan.

== Chief ==
The Military Office was led by a General Staff officer with usually the rank of colonel.

=== Chiefs ===
- ????–1846: Edvard August Peijron
- 1846–????: Pehr Christian Lovén
- ????–1853: ?
- 1853–1862: Eric af Klint
- 1862–1866: Sven Lagerberg
- 1866–1872: Carl Leijonhufvud
- 1872–1873: Hugo Raab
- 1873–1875: Axel Ryding
- 1875–1880: Otto Taube
- 1880–1886: Adam Anders Thorén
- 1886–1888: Hemming Gadd
- 1888–1891: Carl Warberg
- 1891–1892: Carl Nordensvan
- 1891–1897: Carl Axel Nordenskjöld
- 1897–1897: Hans Alexander Gustaf Altvater Pantzerhielm (Note: The major in the General Staff, H.A.G.A. Pantzerhielm, was 20–27 July 1897 posted as office head, during the chief's leave of absence.)
- 1897–1899: Ebbe von Hofsten
- 1899–1900: Hugo Jungstedt
- 1900–1905: Magnus Blomstedt
- 1905–1909: Hugo Hult
- 1909–1912: ?
- 1912–1915: Georg Nyström
- 1915–1919: Hjalmar Säfwenberg
- 1919–1923: Oscar Nygren
- 1923–1926: Carl Sjögreen
- 1926–1929: Bo Boustedt
- 1929–1932: Erik Testrup
- 1932–1934: Torsten Friis
- 1934–1936: Ernst af Klercker
- 1936–1937: Helge Jung (acting)
- 1937–1938: Henry Tottie
- 1938–1945: Henry Kellgren

=== Vice chiefs ===
- 1858–1865: Fredrik Wrangel
- 1865–1867: ?
- 1867–1872: Daniel Nordlander
- 1872–1874: ?
- 1874–1875: Oskar Teodor Fåhræus
- 1875–1879: Carl Bror Munck af Fulkila
- 1880–1880: A.A. Thorén
- 1880–1883: Hemming Gadd
- 1884–1885: Anton Gustaf Jonas af Jochnick
- 1885–1886: Jesper Crusebjörn (acting)
- 1886–1888: Carl Warberg
- 1888–1891: Hans Adolf von Koch
- 1892–1893: Knut Gillis Bildt
- 1893–1895: Bengt Erland Eberhard (Ebbe) von Hofsten
- 1895–1899: Hugo Jungstedt
- 1899–1901: ?
- 1901–1903: Hugo Hult
- 1903–1904: Emil Mörcke (tjf)
- 1904–1906: ?
- 1906–1910: Carl Gustaf Hammarskjöld
- 1910–1915: ?
- 1915–1918: Oscar Nygren
- 1918–1920: Knut Albert Fredrik Lindencrona
- 1920–1928: ?
- 1928–1930: Hjalmar Falk
- 1930–1935: ?
- 1935–1937: Henry Tottie
- 1937–1944: ?
- 1944–1945: Per Kellin
