= Georg af Klercker =

Swedish film director

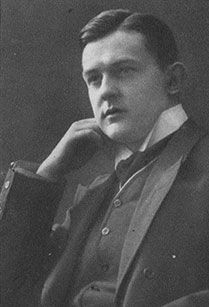
- Georg af Klercker in 1910
- Born: Ernst Georg af Klercker; 15 December 1877; Kristianstad, Sweden
- Died: 13 November 1951 (aged 73); Malmö, Sweden
- Occupations: Film director, screenwriter, actor
- Years active: 1912–1926
- Spouses: Tyra Zelina Sundqvist (m. 1905–1911) Selma Wiklund (m. 1911–1923) Vera Boman (m. 1930–1951)
- Relatives: Ernst af Klercker (brother)

Ernst Georg af Klercker (15 December 1877 – 13 November 1951) was a Swedish film director, screenwriter and actor of the silent era. At the 27th Guldbagge Awards in 1991 he was posthumously presented with the Ingmar Bergman Award. He directed more than 30 films between 1912 and 1926.

== Selected filmography ==
- Mysteriet natten till den 25:e (1916)
- The Österman Brothers' Virago (1925)
- Cavaliers of the Crown (1930)
- South of the Highway (1936)
