= Torsten Friis =

Swedish lieutenant-general and commander of the air force

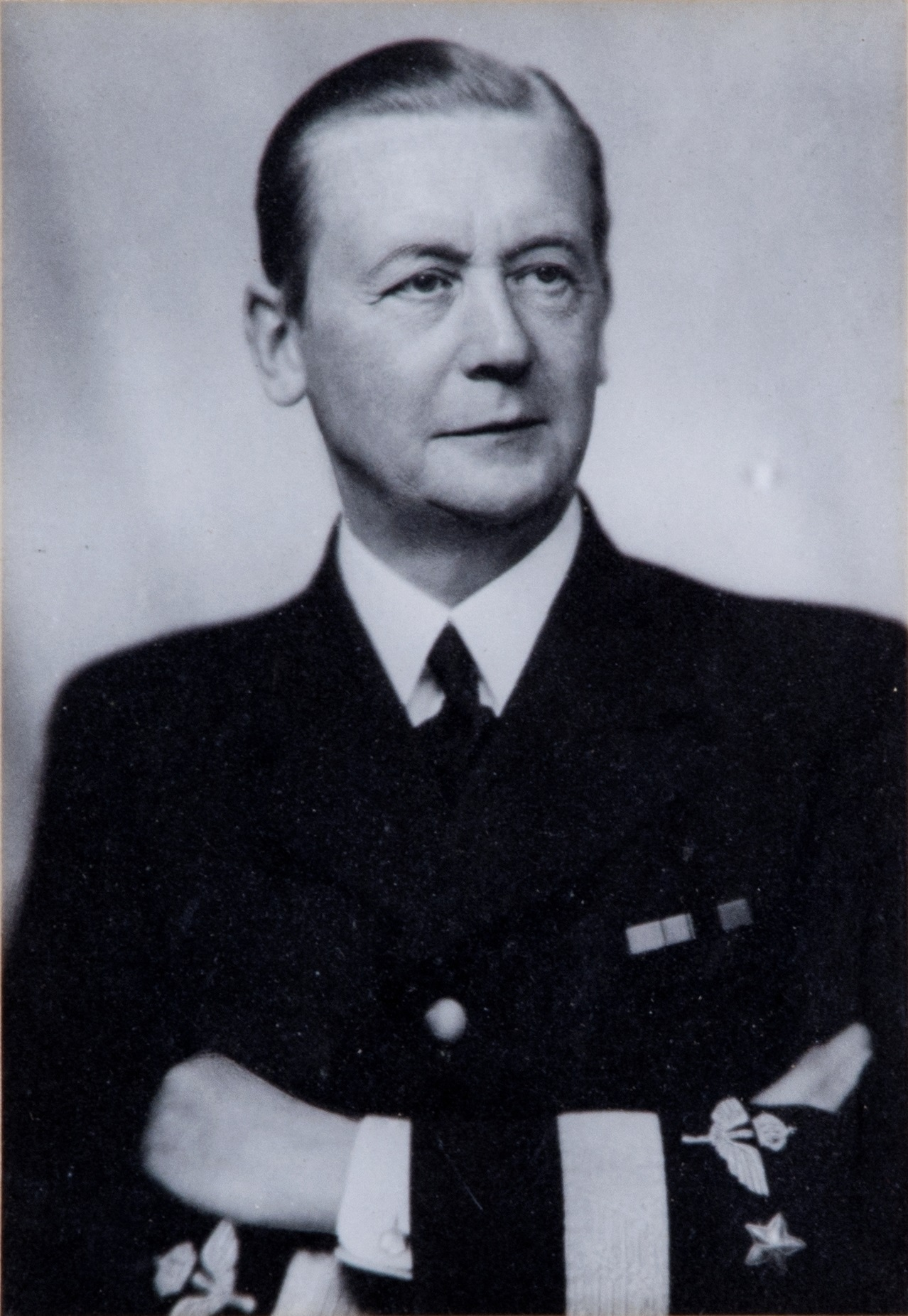
- Friis circa 1942.
- Born: 1 August 1882; Malmö, Sweden
- Died: 21 April 1967 (aged 84); Järfälla, Sweden
- Military career
- Allegiance: Sweden
- Branch: Swedish Air Force
- Service years: 1902–1942
- Rank: Lieutenant General
- Commands: Field Telegraph Corps; Military Office of the Land Defence; Chief of the Air Force

Lieutenant General Torsten Friis (1 August 1882 – 21 April 1967) was a Swedish Air Force officer. Friis was initially a fortification officer and was commanding officer of the Field Telegraph Corps from 1928 to 1932 and chief of the Military Office of the Land Defence from 1932 to 1934. In 1934 he was commissioned to build the Swedish Air Force and was appointed Chief of the Air Force, a position he held until 1942 when he retired.

== Early life ==
Friis was born on 1 August 1882 in Malmö, Sweden, the son of vice consul Ernst Friis and his wife Sophie (née Thomée) and brother of rear admiral Helge Friis (1883–1956). He passed studentexamen in 1900.

== Career ==
Friis was commissioned as an officer 1902 and was given the rank of underlöjtnant the same year. Friis became lieutenant in the Swedish Fortification Corps in 1907 and graduated from the Artillery and Engineering College in 1908. Friis was promoted to captain in 1913 and served in the campaign with the Austro-Hungarian Army in 1916. He was a teacher at the Royal Swedish Army Staff College from 1918 to 1919 and at the Artillery and Engineering College from 1919 to 1921 and served as adjutant to the Crown Prince from 1920 to 1932. He became captain in the General Staff in 1921 and major in the General Staff in 1922.

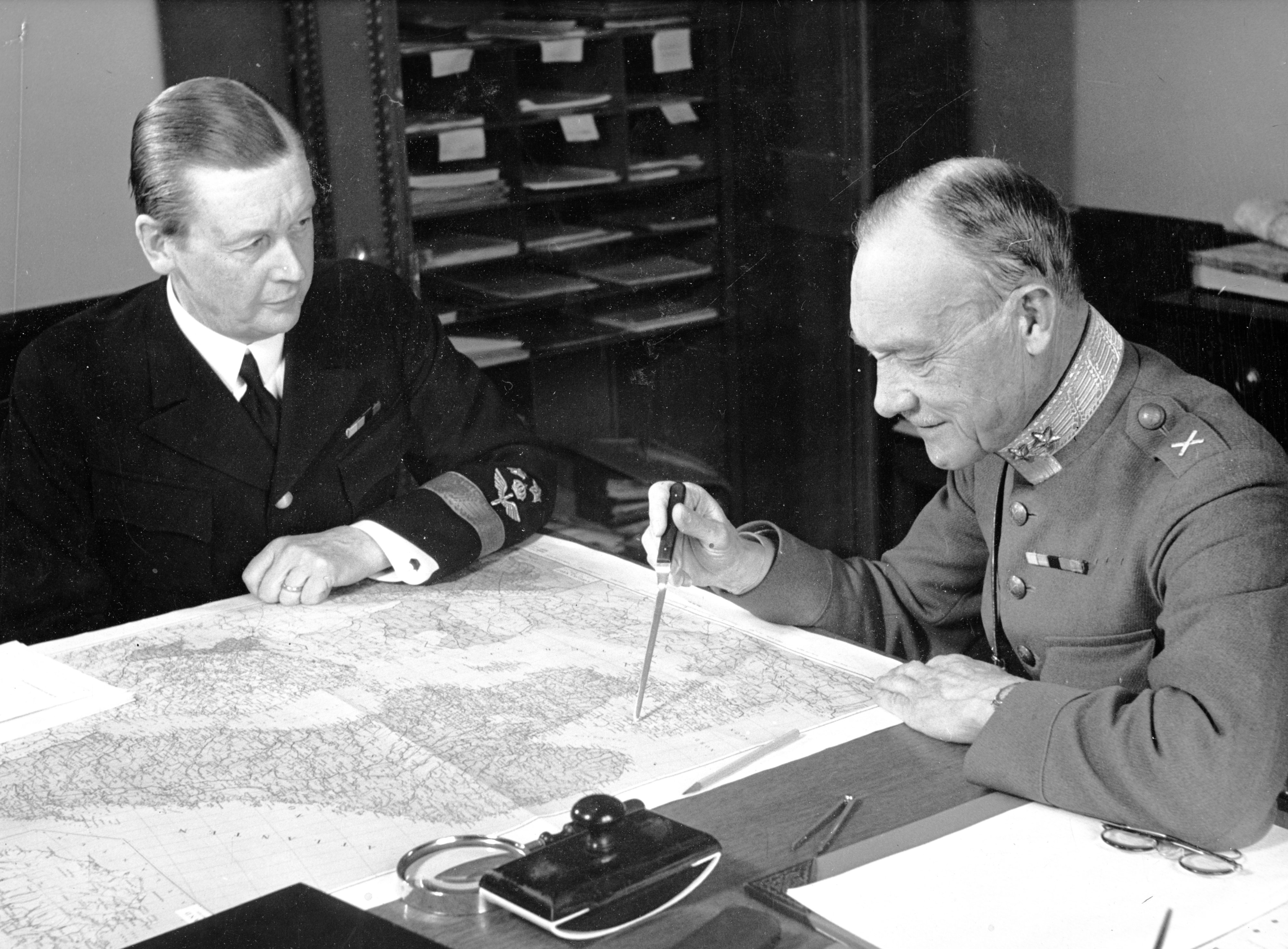
Friis (left) and lieutenant general Per Sylvan in 1940.

Friis was head of department at the General Staff's Technical Department from 1922 to 1927 and was lieutenant colonel in the General Staff in 1926 and became a lieutenant colonel in the Swedish Fortification Corps in 1928. He was commanding officer of the Field Telegraph Corps from 1928 to 1932 and was promoted to colonel in the Field Telegraph Corps in 1932. Friis was chief of the Military Office of the Land Defence from 1932 to 1934 and became major general in the Swedish Air Force in 1934. In April 1934, the then Chief of the Air Force major general Eric Virgin applied for a year's leave of absence, after Virgin and the Abyssinia government entered an agreements to which Virgin would function as chief adviser of the reorganization of the country's army. Friis took over as Chief of the Air Force and was promoted to lieutenant general in 1936.

Friis was determined to make the Air Force as equal and effective weapon as one of the older military branches. Because of this he needed an Air Staff, which was also created by the Defence Act of 1936. The Air Force lacked a staff and pilot trained officer who could be appointed chief of staff. Friis therefore offered Bengt Nordenskiöld this position. Nordenskiöld often expressed opinions and criticism in an arrogant and hurtful way. He was often on matters of fact superior to his subordinates and opponents, but he found it difficult to acknowledge others work and listen to their arguments. Thereby he sometimes counteracted the Air Force interests, and he compromised at times that particular work satisfaction and the cohesion he sought. This prompted the defense minister Per Edvin Sköld and the Supreme Commander Olof Thörnell in 1942 to appeal to Friis to remain as Chief of the Air Force. Although Friis shared Sköld's and Thörnell's opinion on Nordenskiöld, Friis felt that Nordenskiöld had to succeed him if the Air Force would be able to keep up with the ever-accelerating development.

Friis left the position as Chief of the Air Force in 1942 and was placed in the reserve the same year. He was then governor (ståthållare) of Drottningholm Palace, Gripsholm Castle, Haga Palace, Rosersberg Palace, Stockholm Palace, Strömsholm Palace, Tullgarn Palace and Ulriksdal Palace from 1947 to 1962. Friis was standard-bearer of the Orders of His Majesty the King (Kungl. Maj:ts Orden) from 1949 and head of the Royal Djurgården Administration (Kungliga Djurgårdens Förvaltning) from 1949 to 1962. Friis became a member of the Royal Swedish Academy of War Sciences in 1924 and was board member of Royal Automobile Club.

== Personal life ==
In 1909 he married Lotty Salin (1887–1968), the daughter of professor Mauritz Salin and Bertha (née Kempe). Friis was the father of Birgit (born 1910), Lotty (born 1914) and Bertha (1923–1997). Friis was the father in law of colonel Sven Thofelt (married to Birgit), doctor Ole Berg (married to Lotty) and count Karl-Hampus Mörner (married to Bertha). The Friis' acquired the Görväln House in 1937 where they lived until their death in 1967 and 1968.

== Dates of rank ==
- 1902 – Underlöjtnant
- 1907 – Lieutenant
- 1913 – Captain
- 1922 – Major
- 1926 – Lieutenant colonel
- 1932 – Colonel
- 1934 – Major general
- 1936 – Lieutenant general

== Awards and decorations ==
=== Swedish ===
- (Sweden) King Gustaf V's Jubilee Commemorative Medal (1948)
- (Sweden) King Gustaf V's Jubilee Commemorative Medal (1928)
- (Sweden) King Gustaf V's Commemorative Medal (1951)
- (Sweden) Commander Grand Cross of the Order of the Sword (16 June 1937)
- (Sweden) Knight of the Order of the Sword (1923)
- (Sweden) Commander Grand Cross of the Order of the Polar Star (31 December 1949)
- (Sweden) Knight of the Order of the Polar Star (1933)
- (Sweden) Knight of the Order of Vasa (1926)

=== Foreign ===
- (Denmark) Grand Cross of the Order of the Dannebrog (before 1955)
- (Denmark) Commander 1st Class of the Order of the Dannebrog (1935)
- (Denmark) Commander of the Order of the Dannebrog (before 1931)
- (Ethiopian Empire) Grand Cross of the Order of the Star of Ethiopia (before 1955)
- Commander 1st Class of the Order of the White Rose of Finland (1934)
- Grand Cross of the Order of the Lion of Finland (before enast 1962)
- (Finland) Finnish Air Force's Aviation Badge (1938)
- (France) Commander of the Legion of Honour (1937)
- (Iran) Grand Cross of the Order of Homayoun (before 1962)
- Grand Cross of the Order of the Crown of Italy (1945)
- (Lithuania) Commander 1st Class of the Order of Vytautas the Great (1935)
- (Netherlands) Grand Cross of the Order of the House of Orange (before 1962)
- (Norway) Grand Cross of the Order of St. Olav (before 1955)
- (Norway) Commander with Star of the Order of St. Olav (1936)
- (Norway) Commander of the Order of St. Olav (before 1931)
- (Poland) Commander's Cross with Star of the Order of Polonia Restituta (1934)
- (Poland) Polish Air Force's Aviation Badge (1936)
- (United Kingdom) Grand Cross of the Royal Victorian Order (before 1962)
- (Nazi Germany) Grand Cross of the Order of the German Eagle (1938)

Military offices
Preceded by Eggert Nauclér	Field Telegraph Corps; 1928–1932	Succeeded by Gottfried Hain
Preceded by Erik Testrup	Military Office of the Land Defence; 1932–1934	Succeeded by Ernst af Klercker
Preceded by Eric Virgin	Chief of the Air Force; 1934–1942	Succeeded by Bengt Nordenskiöld
