= Bo Boustedt =

Swedish Army officer (1868–1939)

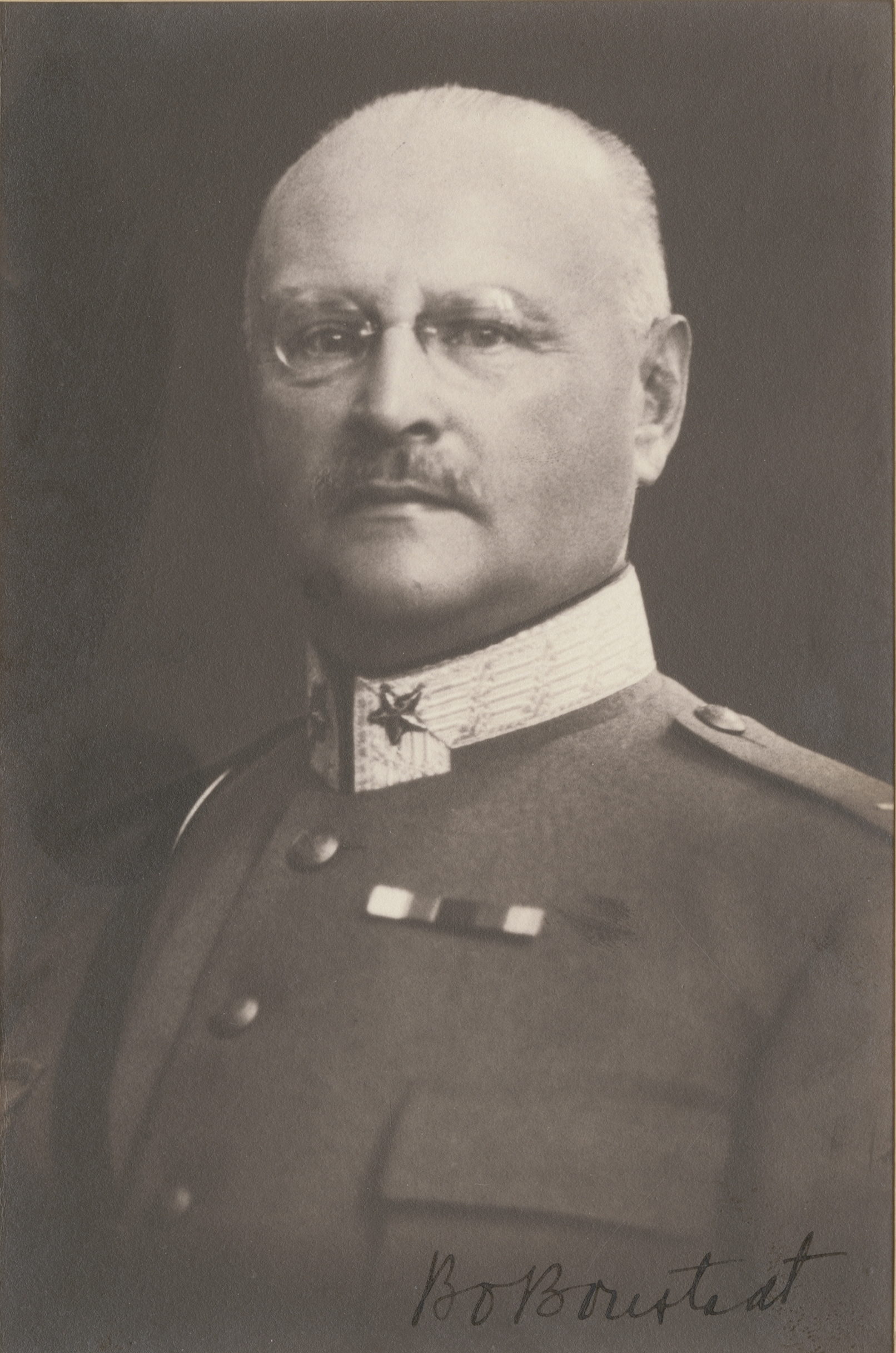
- Boustedt as major general (1928–1933).
- Born: Bo Ivar Boustedt; 28 August 1868; Fuxerna, Sweden
- Died: 24 October 1939 (aged 71); Stockholm, Sweden
- Military career
- Allegiance: Sweden
- Branch: Swedish Army
- Service years: 1891–1933
- Rank: Lieutenant General
- Commands: Västernorrland Regiment; Uppland Infantry Regiment; Military Office of the Land Defence; Eastern Army Division; Commandant General of Stockholm's Garrison; Chief of the General Staff

Lieutenant General Bo Ivar Boustedt (22 August 1868 – 24 October 1939) was a Swedish Army officer. Boustedt's senior commands include regimental commander of Västernorrland Regiment and Uppland Infantry Regiment, chief of the Military Office of the Land Defence, commanding officer of the Eastern Army Division, Commandant General of Stockholm Garrison and Chief of the General Staff.

== Early life ==
Boustedt was born on 22 August 1868 in Fuxerna Parish, Älvsborg County, Sweden, to Captain Axel Boustedt and his wife Amanda Bergius. Boustedt was commissioned as an officer in Bohuslän Regiment in 1891 with the rank of underlöjtnant. He served as a teacher at Billströmska folkhögskolan in Tjörn from 1892 to 1898.

== Career ==
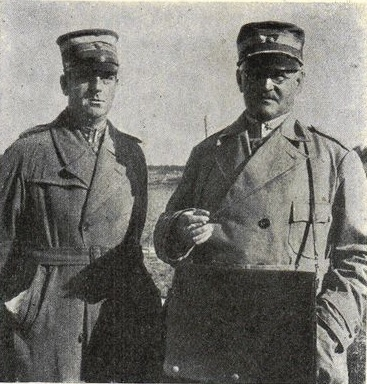
Boustedt (right) and head of the Operations Department, Lieutenant Colonel Axel Rappe.

He was promoted to lieutenant in 1895 and served as lieutenant of the General Staff in 1903 and as captain there in 1904. Boustedt served as teacher at the Swedish Infantry Gunnery School in 1904, and as teacher at the Royal Swedish Army Staff College from 1904 to 1911. Boustedt served as captain in Älvsborg Regiment in 1910 and was promoted to major and appointed head of the Communications Department of the General Staff in 1912. He was promoted to lieutenant colonel there in 1915 and then served in Västernorrland Regiment in 1916.

Boustedt was promoted to colonel in the army in 1917 and was appointed regimental commander of Västernorrland Regiment in 1918. Five years later, Boustedt was appointed regimental commander of Uppland Infantry Regiment. He was at the same time commander of the 9th Infantry Brigade. In 1926, Boustedt was appointed chief of the Military Office of the Land Defence. In 1928, he was promoted to major general and appointed brigade commander in the Western Army Division (Västra arméfördelningen). Boustedt then served as commanding officer of the Eastern Army Division (Östra arméfördelningen) and as Commandant General of Stockholm Garrison for a year before taking up the position as Chief of the General Staff in 1930.

Boustedt was a strong supporter of the idea of intimate cooperation between the Nordic countries for joint protection, wanted the commanders to have intimate contact with other professional groups and wished to broaden their understanding of social life in its various forms. He also drafted instructions for field service training. In Sweden during the 1930s, ideas were born about Swedish-Finnish military cooperation for Finland's (and thus also Sweden's) defense with, among other things, the Swedish field army (plus the air force's 100 fighter aircraft) under a League of Nations flag on the Karelian Isthmus, protect Finland against an expected Soviet attack. A driving force on the Swedish side was Chief of the General Staff Boustedt, who led reconnaissance on the isthmus and was one of the forces behind the opposition group Antingen – eller ("Either...or") within the Swedish Army. As Chief of the General Staff, Boustedt, also disapproved of plans to make propaganda films intended to boost patriotic motivation among the conscripts. In a letter to the Armé- och Marinfilm ("Army and Navy Film", AMF), written in 1931, Boustedt claimed that due to their individualistic national character, Swedish conscripts were suspicious of any manipulative efforts from the authorities. Only films that had no obvious intention of guiding the viewers’ thinking in a certain direction could have a genuine influence on Swedish audiences, he argued.

Boustedt was promoted to lieutenant general in 1933 and retired from the military the same year. After his retirement, he created respect through a series of investigations and extensive attempts to create conditions for the partial modernization of the army, which was decided in 1936. Boustedt was also secretary of the Military Literature Association (Militärlitteraturföreningen) from 1909 to 1917, member of the Infantry Commission (Infanterikommissionen) from 1920 to 1921, military member of the King's Supreme Court from 1930 until 18 May 1934, as well as chairman of the 1933 Flight Commission (1933 års flygkommission).

== Personal life ==
In 1917, he married Stina Håkansson (born 1881), the daughter of captain Axel Håkansson and Emma Tottie. They were parents of Bo Boustedt (1919–2001), an architect.

== Death ==
Boustedt died on 24 October 1939 at Röda Korsets sjukhem in Stockholm.

== Dates of rank ==
- 20 November 1891 – Underlöjtnant
- 4 October 1895 – Lieutenant
- 4 October 1904 – Captain
- 26 April 1912 – Major
- 26 February 1915 – Lieutenant colonel
- 13 November 1917 – Colonel
- 1928 – Major general
- 1933 – Lieutenant general

== Awards and decorations ==
- (Sweden) Commander 1st Class of the Order of the Sword (8 December 1923)
- (Sweden) Commander 2nd Class of the Order of the Sword (1921)
- (Sweden) Knight of the Order of the Sword (1912)
- (Sweden) Commander 1st Class of the Order of Vasa (28 November 1929)
- (Sweden) Knight of the Order of Vasa (1913)
- (Sweden) Knight of the Order of the Polar Star (1916)
- (France) Officer of the Legion of Honour

== Honours ==
- Member of the Royal Swedish Academy of War Sciences (1913)

== Bibliography ==
- Statsbanornas användning för militära ändamål (1906)
- Boustedt, Bo Ivar (1912). Kriget i Tyskland 1809: Regensburg. Skrifter / Militärlitteraturföreningens förlag, 99-0578882-4; 110 (in Swedish). Stockholm: Norstedt. SELIBR 1633657.

Military offices
| Preceded by Carl Sjögreen | Military Office of the Land Defence; 1926–1929 | Succeeded by Erik Testrup |
| Preceded by Ludvig Hammarskiöld | Eastern Army Division; 1929–1930 | Succeeded by Gösta Lilliehöök |
| Preceded by Ludvig Hammarskiöld | Commandant General in Stockholm; 1929–1930 | Succeeded by Gösta Lilliehöök |
| Preceded by Carl Gustaf Hammarskjöld | Chief of the General Staff; 1930–1933 | Succeeded by Oscar Nygren |
