= Ministry of Land Defence =

Former Swedish government ministry

- Lantförsvarsdepartementet

Ministry of defence overview
- Formed: 16 May 1840
- Dissolved: 30 June 1920
- Superseding Ministry of defence: Ministry of Defence
- Headquarters: Stockholm, Sweden
- Minister responsible: Minister of War
- Parent agency: Royal Chancery

Ministry of Land Defence (Swedish: Lantförsvarsdepartementet) was in a broad sense, one of the eight ministries, in which the Swedish government administration was divided into. Its head was called Minister of War. The Ministry of Land Defence Department was established on 16 May 1840 and was merged with the Ministry for Naval Affairs into the newly established Ministry of Defence on 30 June 1920.

== History ==
The Ministry of Land Defence was established in connection with the ministry reform in 1840. The cases, previously handled by the War Office (Krigsexpeditionen), were now divided between the Ministry of Land Defence and the Ministry for Naval Affairs. The Ministry of Land Defence's first cabinet meeting day was on 19 May 1840. According to the Royal Decree concerning the distribution of cases between the ministries on 16 May 1840 (SFS 1840 No. 14), the following cases sorted under the Ministry of Land Defence:

Cases relating to the organization and maintenance of the land defence, as well as the staff, the disposition of funds and equipment to the land defence, the construction and maintenance of fortifications, educational institutions, church and medical affairs, pension and charity facilities for the land army and associated staff; the Allotment system and Roteringsverket for the army; questions about commanding land troops for service or use for the necessary public works; the care of homes and buildings of the land defence, and The Crown's additional insight into the use of artillery foundry (styckebruk), the rifle factories and the gunpowder manufacturing; questions concerning telegraph arrangements (the telegraphic arrangements here means the military optical telegraph) in Sweden, with the exception of the individual needs of the Swedish Navy. In addition came the so-called command matters (kommandomålen), i.e. those matters of generally less importance which were determined by the king as Supreme Commander of Sweden's military force.

These cases were settled, in accordance with §15 of the Instrument of Government for the Ministry of Land Defence's concern, by the King, following presentation by the head of the Ministry of Land Defence, and in attendance only by him. The command matters mainly concerned the Swedish Army's weapons exercises, schools, training courses, personnel accounts, service conditions, regulations, etc. During the period up to the issue of the renewed ministry statute in 1900, the ministry was liberated from some of the often complex cases relating to the gradual modifications of the allotment system. Following the decommissioning of the allotment system by the new army order in 1901, only the cases relating to its decommissioning remained. Until the Ministry of Land Defence's merging into the Ministry of Defence in 1920, some significant changes in the ministry's area of affairs did not take place. In 1920, the ministry's all cases were transferred to the new ministry. For preparing these cases, the head of the ministry had a department of the Royal Majesty's Chancery (Kunglig Majestäts kansli), which consisted of one permanent undersecretary, two deputy directors (kansliråd) and directors (byråchef), three office secretaries, one registrar and an unspecified number of extra officials (assistants).

Under the Ministry of Land Defence sorted government agencies such as: the Military Office of the Ministry of Land Defence and the Royal Swedish Army Materiel Administration. The ministry also belonged to the army with its Generalitet, (Note: Generalitet or Generalitetet, the collective term for all the generals in an army. Also the term for (and an administrative corps) for all generals in active service and in the reserve in the Swedish Army.) the General Staff, the regiments and the corps, the Commendant Staff (Kommendantskapen), the Royal Swedish Army Staff College, the Artillery and Engineering College, the Royal Military Academy, the Royal Swedish Academy of War Sciences and other military education and training institutions, the subordinate ordnance, ammunition and rifle stores of the Royal Swedish Army Materiel Administration, the investigative offices in Stockholm and at Karlsborg, the Fortification Commissariat (Fästningsintendenturen) in Stockholm, the State Warehouse Agency (Magasinsstaten) in Stockholm with the Crown Bakery (Kronobageriet), the Carl Gustafs Stads Gevärsfaktori, Marieberg's Ammunition Factory, Fortification Treasurers and custodians, the Potassium Nitrate Maker's School (Salpetersjuderiskolan), the Discipline Company at Karlsborg, the garrison hospitals in Stockholm and at Karlsborg, as well as all the foundations of the land defence.

As a result of the act on the state ministries on 19 June 1919, the Ministry of Land Defence and the Ministry for Naval Affairs were merged into a new ministry, the Ministry of Defence, from 1 July 1920.

== Location ==
During the years 1840–1851, the Ministry of Land Defence was, like the Ministry for Naval Affairs, located in the Stenbockska palatset at Birger Jarls torg 4. During this time, however, the Military Office was located in the so-called Preisiska huset at Drottninggatan 36. In 1851, the ministry moved to Mynthuset (the predecessor of the current Kanslihuset), where it remained until 1920.

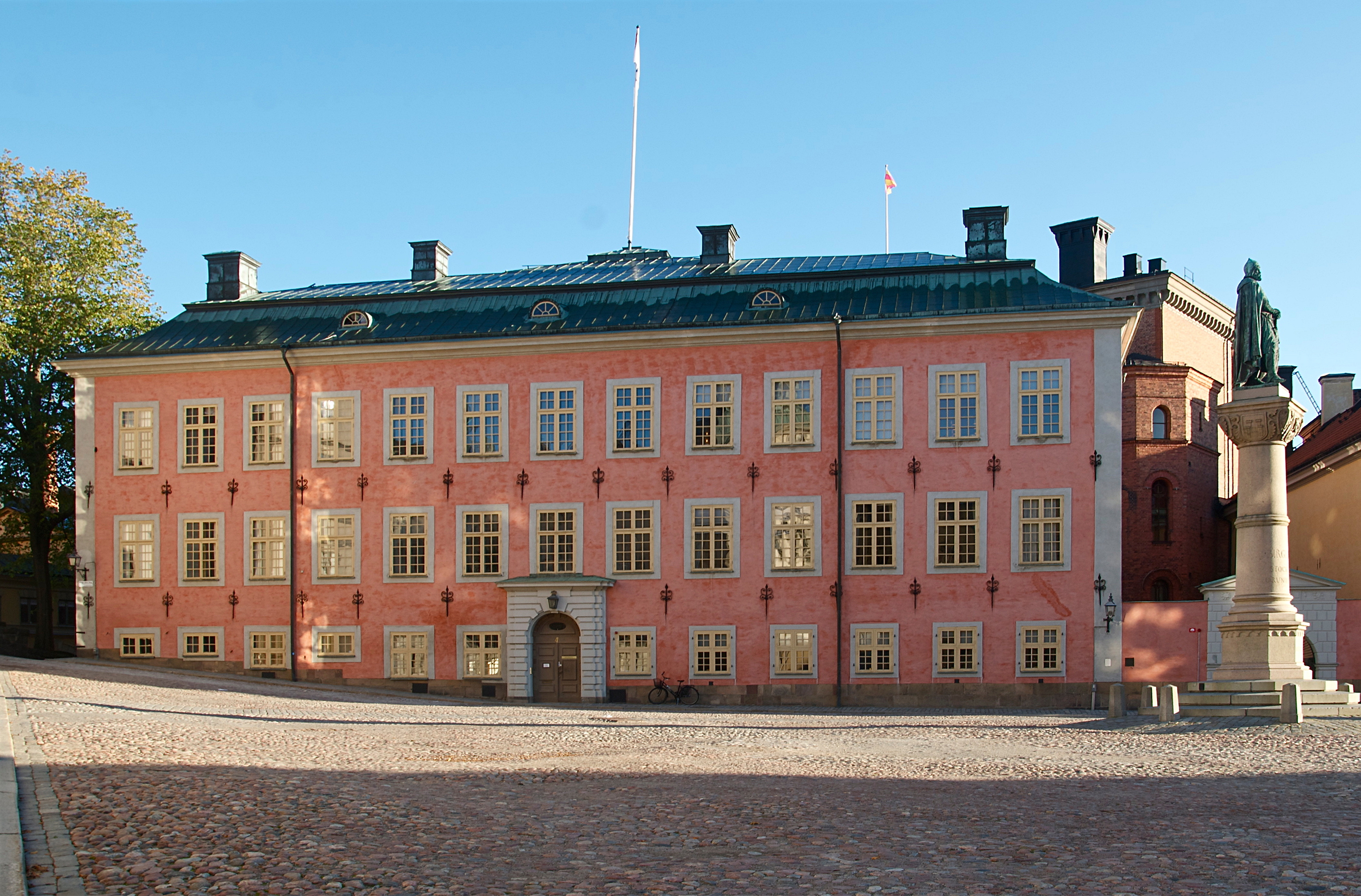
Stenbockska palatset at Birger Jarls torg 4, the first location of the ministry from 1840 until 1851.

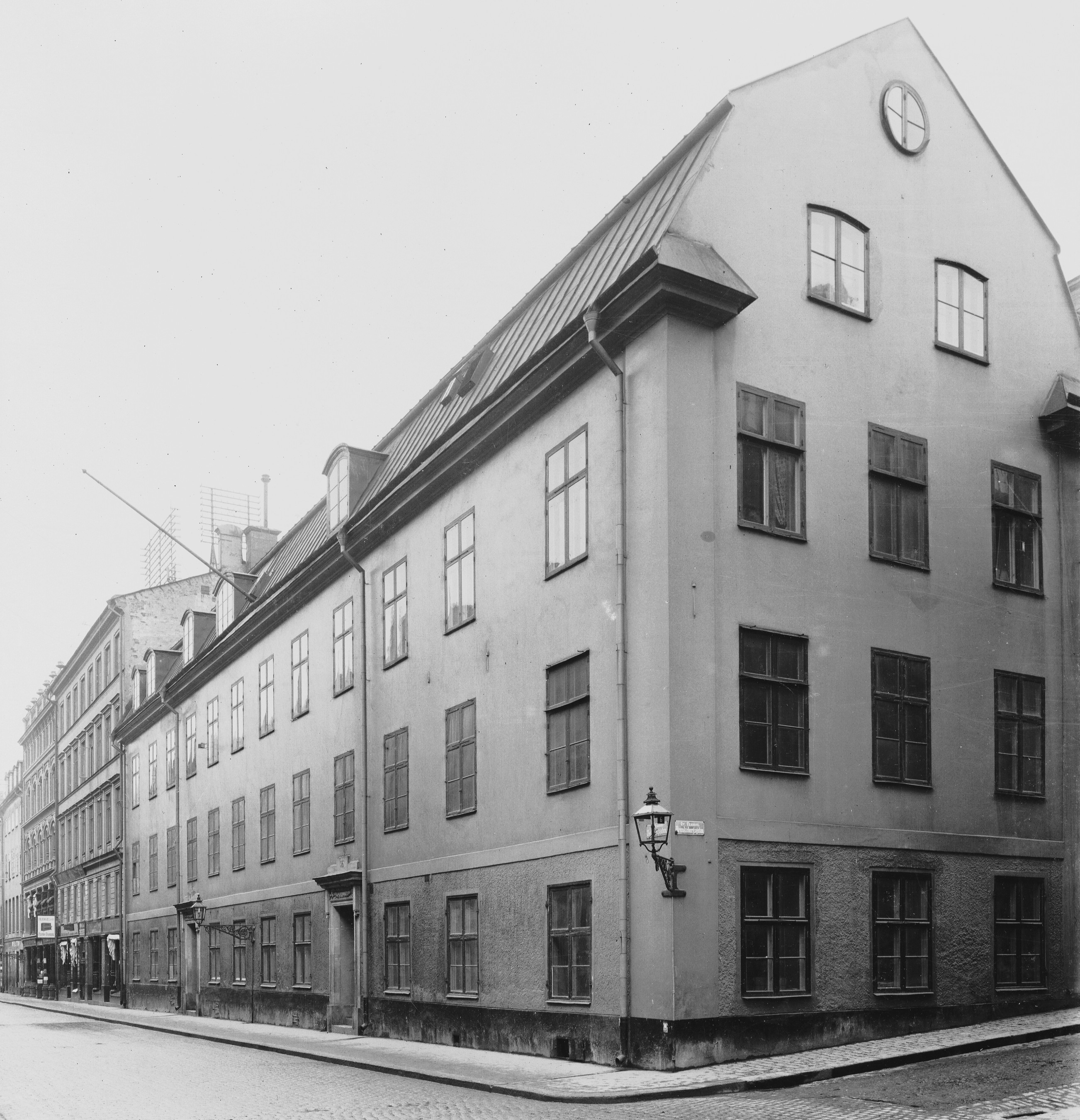
Preisiska huset at Drottninggatan 36, the location of the Military Office from 1840 until 1851.

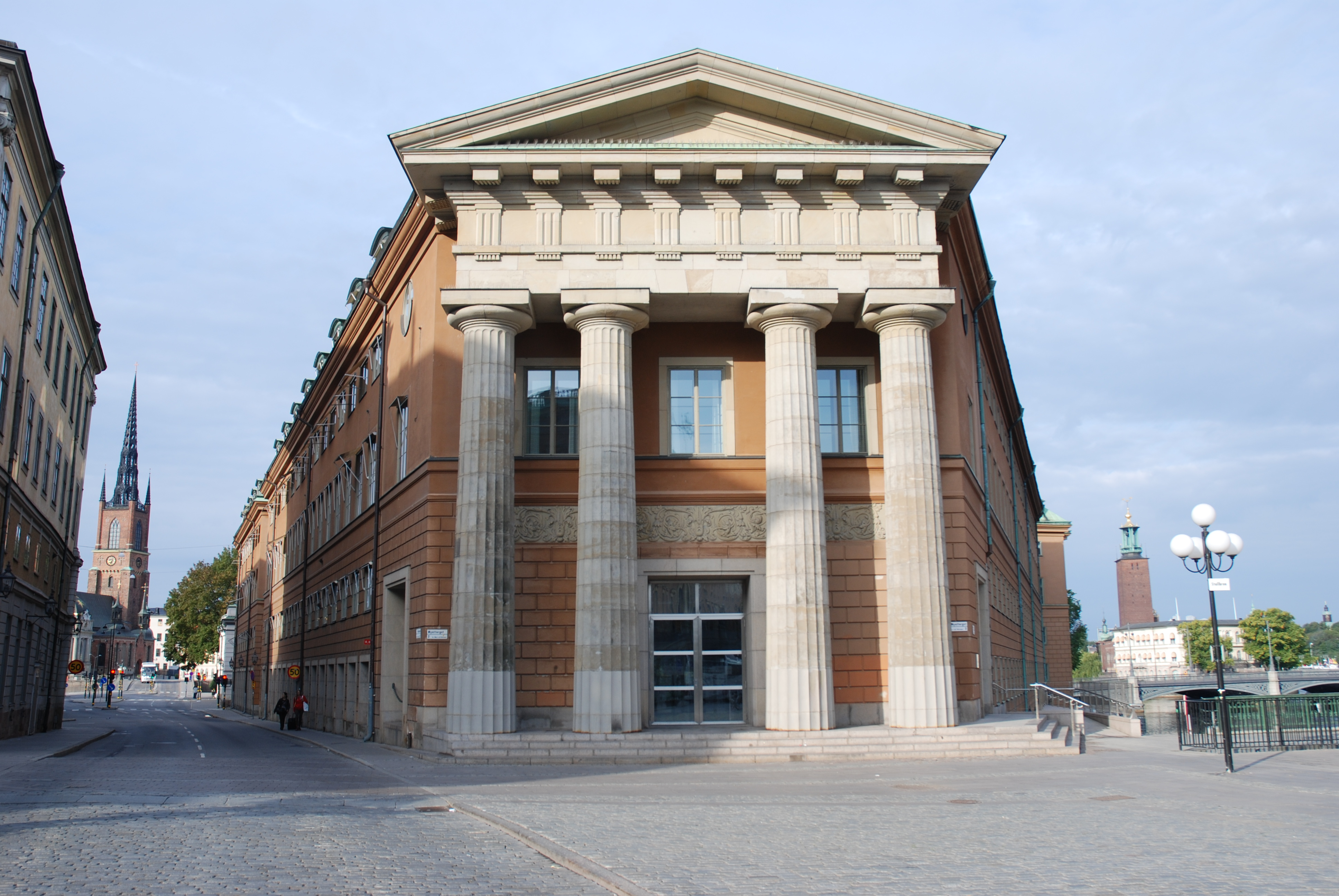
Mynthuset at Mynttorget, the second location of the ministry from 1851 until 1920.

== Ministers ==
The head of the ministry had officially the title of "Council of State (Statsråd) and head of the Ministry of Land Defence", but was commonly referred to as the Minister of War.

- 1840–1840: Bror Cederström
- 1840–1843: Axel Otto Mörner
- 1843–1844: Arfved Lovisin
- 1844–1848: Gustaf Peyron
- 1848–1853: Carl Ludvig von Hohenhausen
- 1853–1858: Nils Gyldenstolpe
- 1858–1862: Magnus Björnstjerna
- 1862–1867: Alexander Reuterskiöld
- 1867–1871: Gustaf Abelin
- 1871–1877: Oscar Weidenhielm
- 1877–1880: Henrik Rosensvärd
- 1880–1882: Otto Taube
- 1882–1887: Axel Ryding
- 1887–1888: Gustaf Oscar Peyron
- 1888–1892: Hjalmar Palmstierna
- 1892–1899: Axel Rappe
- 1899–1903: Jesper Crusebjörn
- 1903–1905: Otto Virgin
- 1905–1907: Lars Tingsten
- 1907–1907: Arvid Lindman
- 1907–1911: Olof Malm
- 1911–1914: David Bergström
- 1914–1914: Hjalmar Hammarskjöld
- 1914–1917: Emil Mörcke
- 1917–1917: Joachim Åkerman
- 1917–1920: Erik Nilson
- 1920–1920: Per Albin Hansson

== Permanent Undersecretaries ==
- 1840–1843: Carl David Forsberg
- 1843–1844: Carl Wilhelm Riben
- 1844–1855: Malcolm von Schantz
- 1855–1866: Carl Gustaf Årman
- 1866–1873: Nils Adolf Varenius
- 1873–1881: Alfred Sjöberg
- 1881–1886: Erik Elliot
- 1886–1895: Ehrenfried von der Lancken
- 1895–1898: Carl Edvard Cassel
- 1898–1899: Emil Sjöberg
- 1899–1904: Carl Herman Weidenheim
- 1904–1909: Fredrik Bergenholtz
- 1909–1916: Oscar Henry Arsell
- 1916–1917: Carl Malmroth (acting)
- 1917–1920: Knut Söderwall

== State Secretaries ==
- 1917–1920: Carl Malmroth
