= Hedvig Eleonora Parish =

Hedvig Eleonora Parish Hedvig Eleonora församling
- Parish
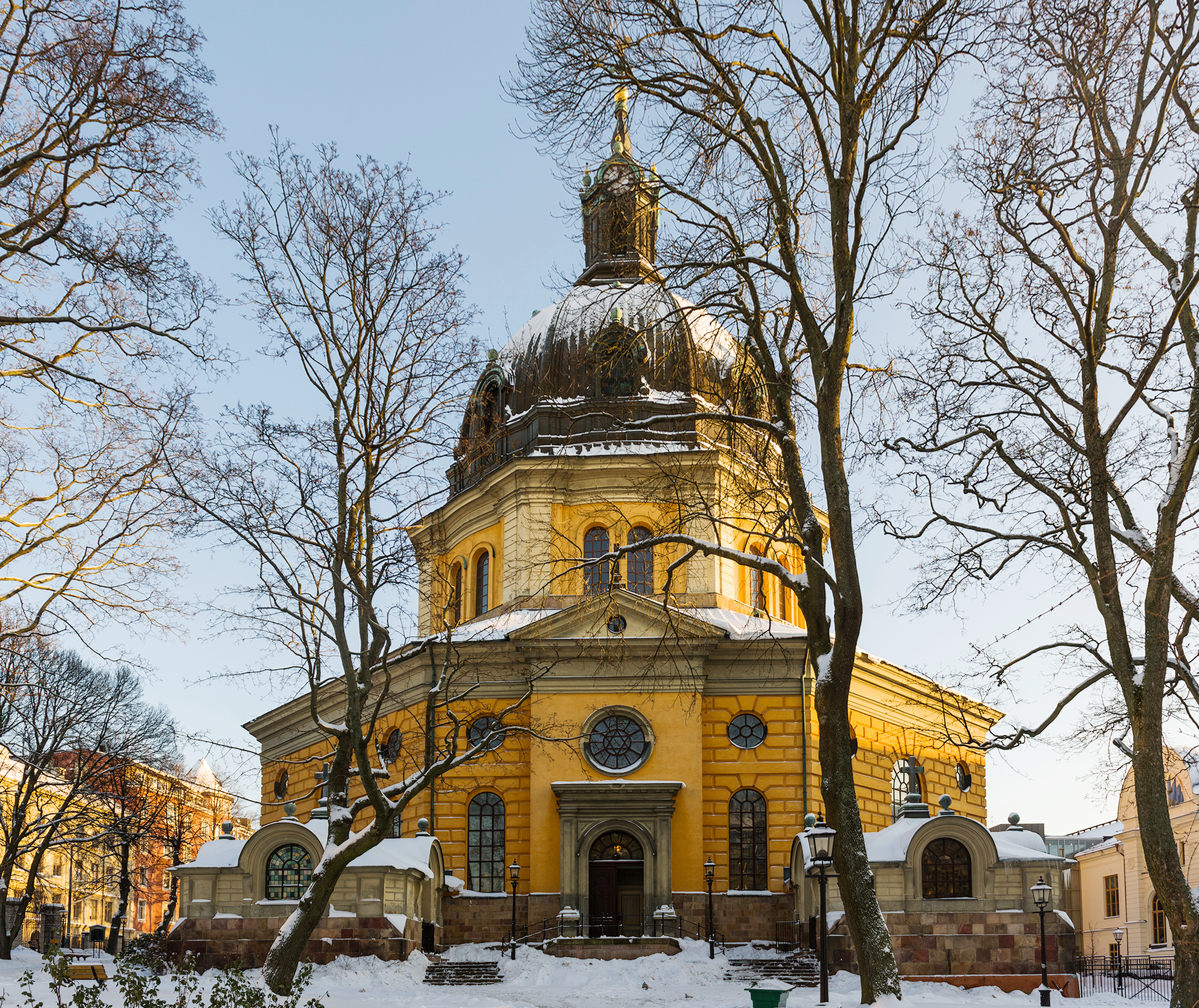
- Hedvig Eleonora Church

- Location within Stockholm Location within Sweden
- Coordinates: 59°20′08″N 18°04′52″E
- Country: Sweden
- Municipality: Stockholm Municipality
- Religious congregation: Church of Sweden
- Diocese: Diocese of Stockholm
- Founded: 17 April 1672

Government
  - Vicar: Sven Milltoft

Population (31 December 2014)
  - Total: 10,915
- Parish code: 018011 (1952-01-01–1966-12-31) and 018010 (1967-01-01–)
- Pastorship code: 131101
- Website: hedvigeleonora.se

Hedvig Eleonora Parish (Swedish: Hedvig Eleonora församling) is a parish in Östermalm's church district (kontrakt) in the Diocese of Stockholm, Sweden. The parish is located in Stockholm Municipality in Stockholm County. The parish forms its own pastorship.

== History ==
The parish was formed on 17 April 1672, by an outbreak from the Holmkyrkan Parish (Holmkyrkans församling). Until 1737, the parish was also called the Ladugårdsland Parish (Ladugårdslands församling) and has also been called the Östermalm Parish (Östermalms församling). In 1724 and 1749, the Borgerskapets änkhus församling and Hedvig Eleonora fattighus församling broke out, respectively. In 1819, the Djurgårdens landsförsamling broke out, but returned in 1868. On 1 May 1906, Engelbrekt Parish and Oscar Parish were broken out. The parish has formed and constitutes its own pastorship with the exception of the period from 1819 to 1868 when it was the head parish of the pastorship of Hedvig Eleonora och Djurgårdens landsförsamling.

== Location ==
Hedvig Eleonora Parish belongs to Östermalm's church district (kontrakt) which also includes Oscar and Engelbrekt parishes. The parish consists of the central part of the district of Östermalm and is geographically small, a few blocks between Valhallavägen in the north, Strandvägen with the Royal Dramatic Theatre in the south, Skeppargatan in the east and Brahegatan in the west. The only church of the parish, Hedvig Eleonora Church, founded in 1669 and inaugurated in 1737, is located at Östermalm square, where also Östermalmshallen, the Swedish Army Museum, Stockholm Music Museum, and the Royal Stables are located. The church is Östermalm's oldest church and was the main church until Östermalm was divided into three parishes in 1906.

On 1 January 1976, Hedvig Eleonora Parish covered an area of 0.6 square kilometers, of which 0.6 square kilometer was land.

== Vicars ==
- 1647–1697: Jonas Gravnader
- 1697–1709: Abraham Alcinius
- 1711–1715: Georg Wallberg
- 1719–1731: Michael Hermonius
- 1731–1738: Olof Hökerstedt
- 1738–1757: Johan Göstaf Hallman
- 1758–1766: Anders Carl Rutström
- 1767–1777: Johan Stenbeck
- 1779–1791: Olof Eneroth Olofsson
- 1802–1820: Lars Peter Widing
- 1822–1852: Mårten Christoffer Bergvall
- 1853–1881: Per Lindsten
- 1883–1885: Ernst Julius Östrand
- 1888–1908: Gustaf Oskar Lagerström
- 1910–1933: Josef Källander
- 1934–1964: Erik Bergman
- 1964–1977: Hans Åkerhielm af Blombacka
- 1977–1987: Erik Albertson
- 1987–1998: Arne Broberg
- 1998–2006: Olof Sjöholm
- 2006–2008: Cecilia Melder
- 2008–present: Sven Milltoft
