= Swedish Army Service Troops =

Swedish Army military logistics unit

- Trängtrupperna
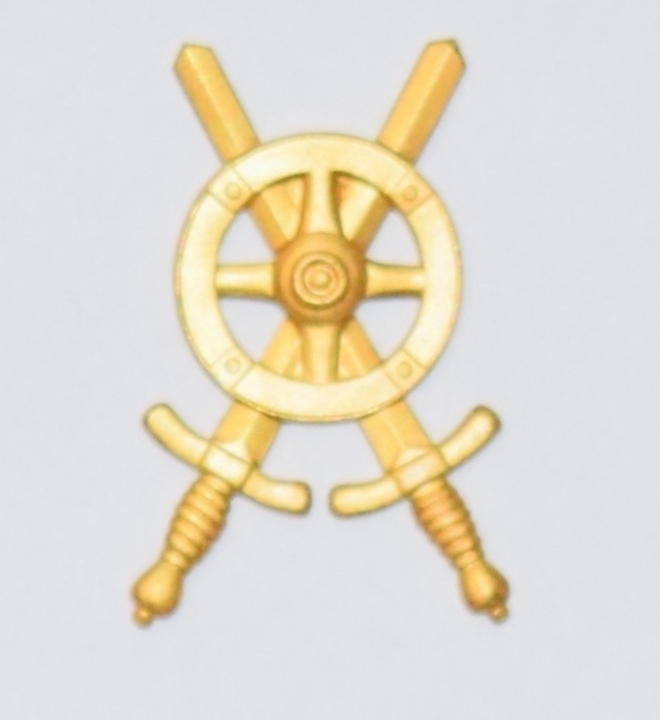
- Branch insignia m/60.
- Active: 1885–present
- Country: Sweden
- Allegiance: Swedish Armed Forces
- Branch: Swedish Army
- Type: Logistics
- Part of: Swedish Armed Forces Headquarters (Note: The branch was subordinate the Swedish Army Service Troops (Tränginspektören) at the Service Department of the Army Staff from 1942 to 1991. After that, it was subordinate to the commander of the Swedish Army Maintenance Center (1991–1997), the commander of the Swedish Army Center (1997–2000), the Joint Forces Command (2000–2005), and the Swedish Armed Forces Headquarters from 2005.)

Insignia
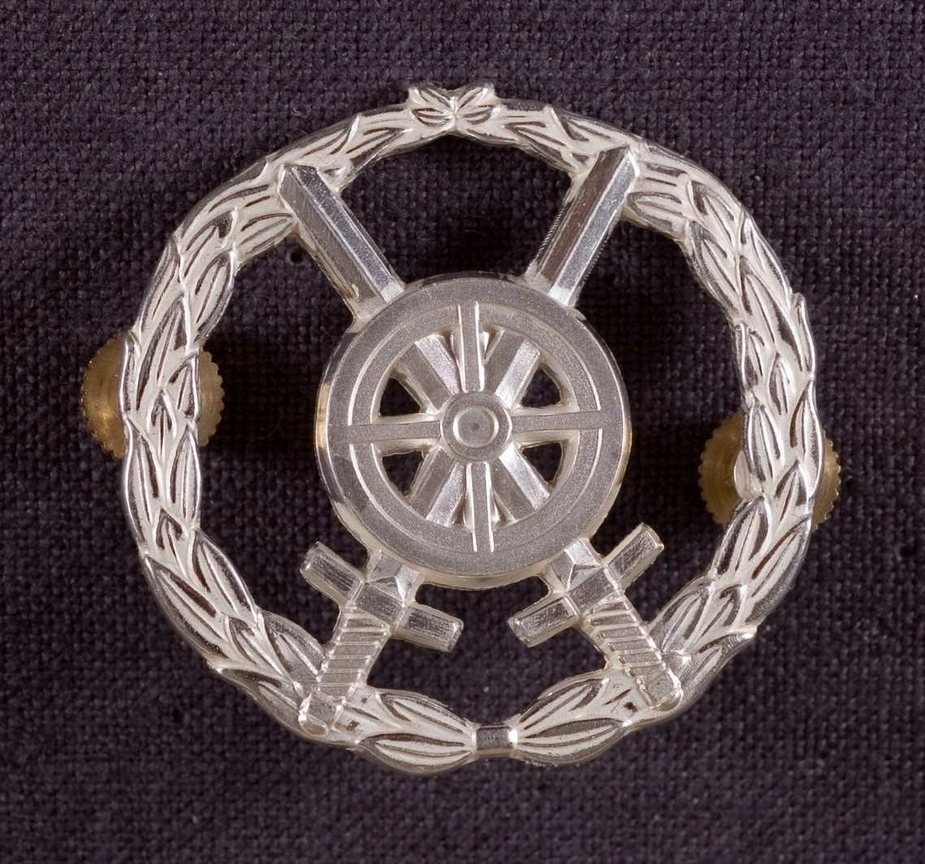
- Cap badge

The Swedish Army Service Troops (Swedish: Trängtrupperna, T or Underhållstrupperna, before 1942 called Trängen) is the military logistics (or train) branch of the Swedish Army. The task of the troops is to train personnel for maintenance units, provide supplies, repair damaged equipment, retract and care for sick personnel as well as in the event of war mobilizing them. The troops are today fully motorized.

== History ==
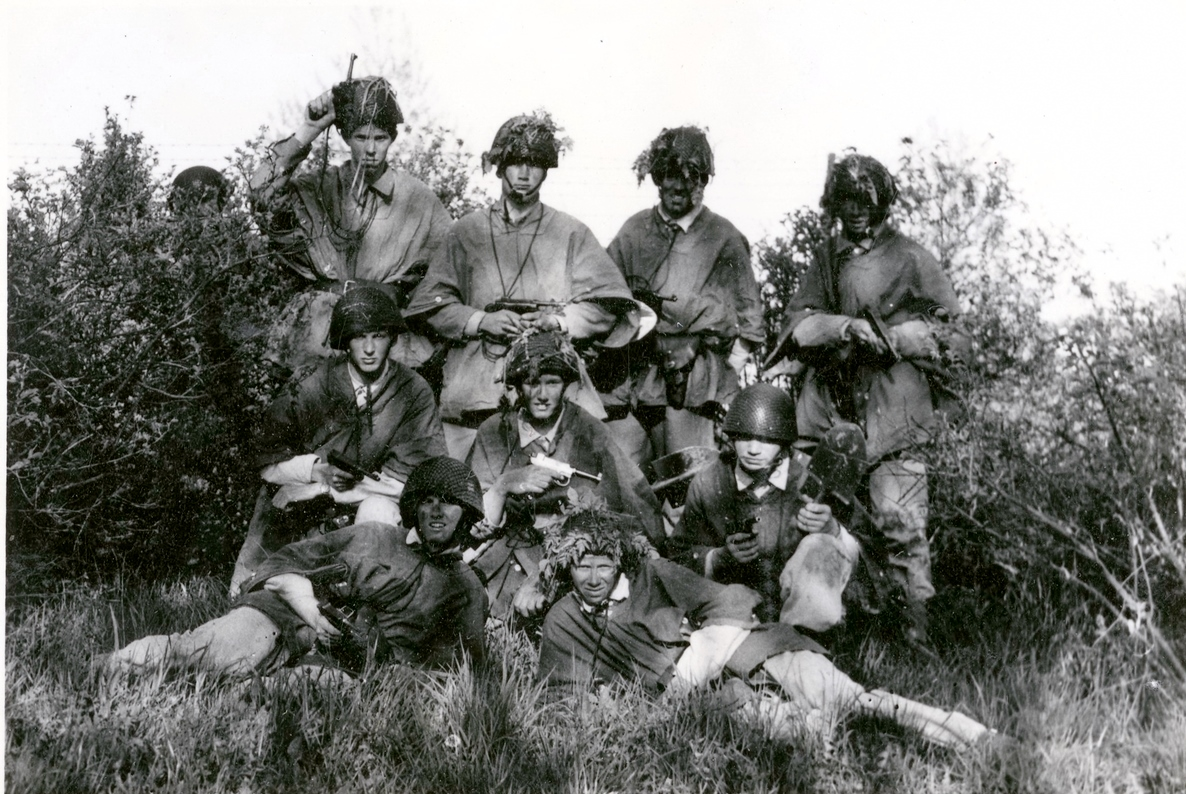
Combat medics of the Scanian Logistic Regiment (T 4) in the 1950s.

In 1885, the first army service unit was established, the Logistic Battalion (Trängbataljonen) in Marieberg, Stockholm. It was divided into the Svea Logistic Battalion (T 1) and the Göta Logistic Battalion (T 2) in 1891, the latter being placed in Karlsborg. According to the Defence Act of 1892, two new logistic battalions, Norrland Logistic Battalion (T 3) in Sollefteå and Wendes Logistic Battalion (T 4) in Landskrona were established. Through the Defence Act of 1901, two further logistic units (now called corps) were established, so that there would be one logistic unit for each army division. These were the 2nd Svea Logistic Corps (T 5) and 2nd Göta Logistic Corps (T 6), which were placed in Sala (1906), and in Linköping (1911) respectively. They changed names in 1904 to Västmanland Logistic Corps (T 5), and Östgöta Logistic Corps (T 6). Meanwhile, Wendes Logistic Corps changed name to Scanian Logistic Corps. In 1905, Göta Logistic Corps moved to Skövde and in 1907 Svea Logistic Corps moved to Örebro and Scanian Logistic Corps moved to Hässleholm.

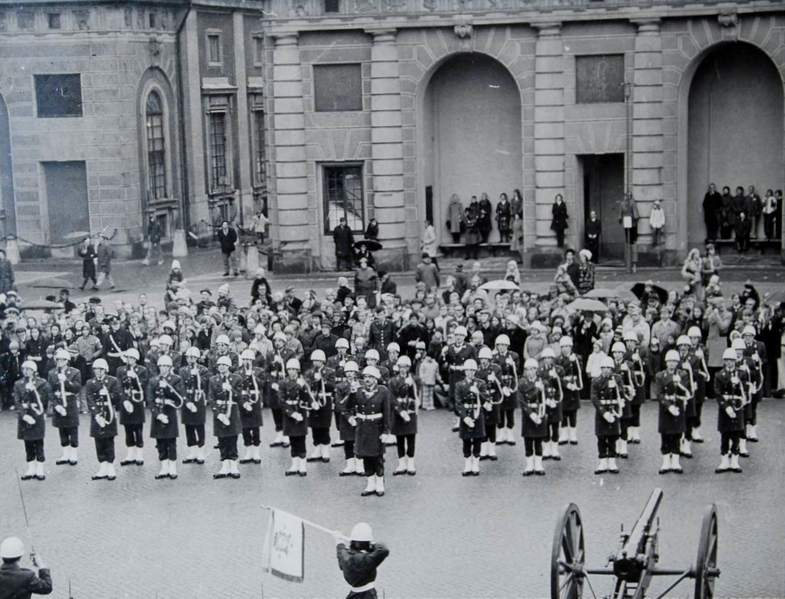
Soldiers of the Scanian Logistic Regiment (T 4) performing Royal Guards duties at Stockholm Palace, 2 November 1974.

In the Defence Act of 1914, an inspector (colonel) became the highest guardian of the army service corps. By now it occupied 87 officers plus 6 regimental physicians and 6 battalion physicians, 6 battalion veterinarians and regimental pastors. According to the Defence Act of 1925, Västmanland and Östgöta Logistic Corps were disbanded, while Svea Logistic Corps was placed in Linköping. The Swedish Army Service Troops now consisted of the Inspector of the Swedish Army Service Troops with staff as well as four corps'. In each corps, a train, an automobile and a medical company were organized. In the Defence Act of 1942, the Swedish Army Service Troops were significantly expanded and an independent logistic company was established in Nora (T 2 N), disbanded in 1952. After the independent commissariat and ordnance companies were transferred to the army service troops, the corps became regiments (1949). In 1954 there were Svea Logistic Regiment (T 1) in Linköping, Göta Logistic Regiment (T 2) in Skövde, Norrland Logistic Regiment (T 3) in Sollefteå and Scanian Logistic Regiment (T 4) in Hässleholm. Officers where trained at the Swedish Army Service Troops Cadet School (Trängtruppernas kadettskola, TrängKS) 1942–1961, the Swedish Army Service Troops Cadet and Officer Candidate School (Trängtruppernas kadett- och aspirantskola, TrängKAS) 1961–1981, the Swedish Army Service Troops Officers College (Trängtruppernas officershögskola, TrängOHS) 1981–1991 and the Swedish Army Maintenance Center (Arméns underhållscentrum, UhC) 1991–1997.

Since 2004, the only remaining unit of the Swedish Army Service Troops is the Logistic Regiment (TrängR) in Skövde. It consists, among other units, of the 1st and the 2nd Logistics Battalions, which has the tasks of supplying materiel such as fuel, ammunition, food, water and other equipment to the units of the Swedish Armed Forces. The battalions are organized with one battalion staff, one command company and three logistics companies. In peacetime, the battalions has one medical reinforcement company each.

== Uniforms ==
=== Miscellaneous ===
In 1885 the first uniform of the new army branch was approved. The model was based on the dragoon uniform. The tunic was of dark blue broadcloth, double-buttoned with shoulder straps and medium blue facing fastened with seven silver-coloured buttons of corps model on each side and medium blue piping along the bottom edge. The Prussian collar and cuffs were medium blue and decorated with two white buttonholes. The long trousers and the riding breeches were of dark blue broadcloth and had medium blue piping on the outer seams. Officers had silver-coloured epaulettes with medium blue lining. Headgear was a dark blue cap m/1865 of infantry model or a casque of black leather with plate and chinstrap of silver-plated metal. On parade the point could be exchanged for a drooping plume of black horsehair. A belt of brown leather or, for officers, a blue and yellow sash were worn when needed. For footgear, black boots or riding boots with spurs.

In 1895 a dark blue single-buttoned tunic with medium blue collar and piping along the front and lower edge and on the rear pockets. A white buttonhole with a button on each cuff. Cap m/1865 was replaced by cap m/1886. The casque was kept but from 1895 was called helmet. In 1900 a stable jacket of dark blue broadcloth was introduced for officers and NCOs.

=== Arms and strappings ===
The officer's sabre m/1891 was replaced by sabre m/1872 for all personnel. Hand-held firearms were carbine m/1870 and m/1894 while officers had revolver m/1871 and m/1887.

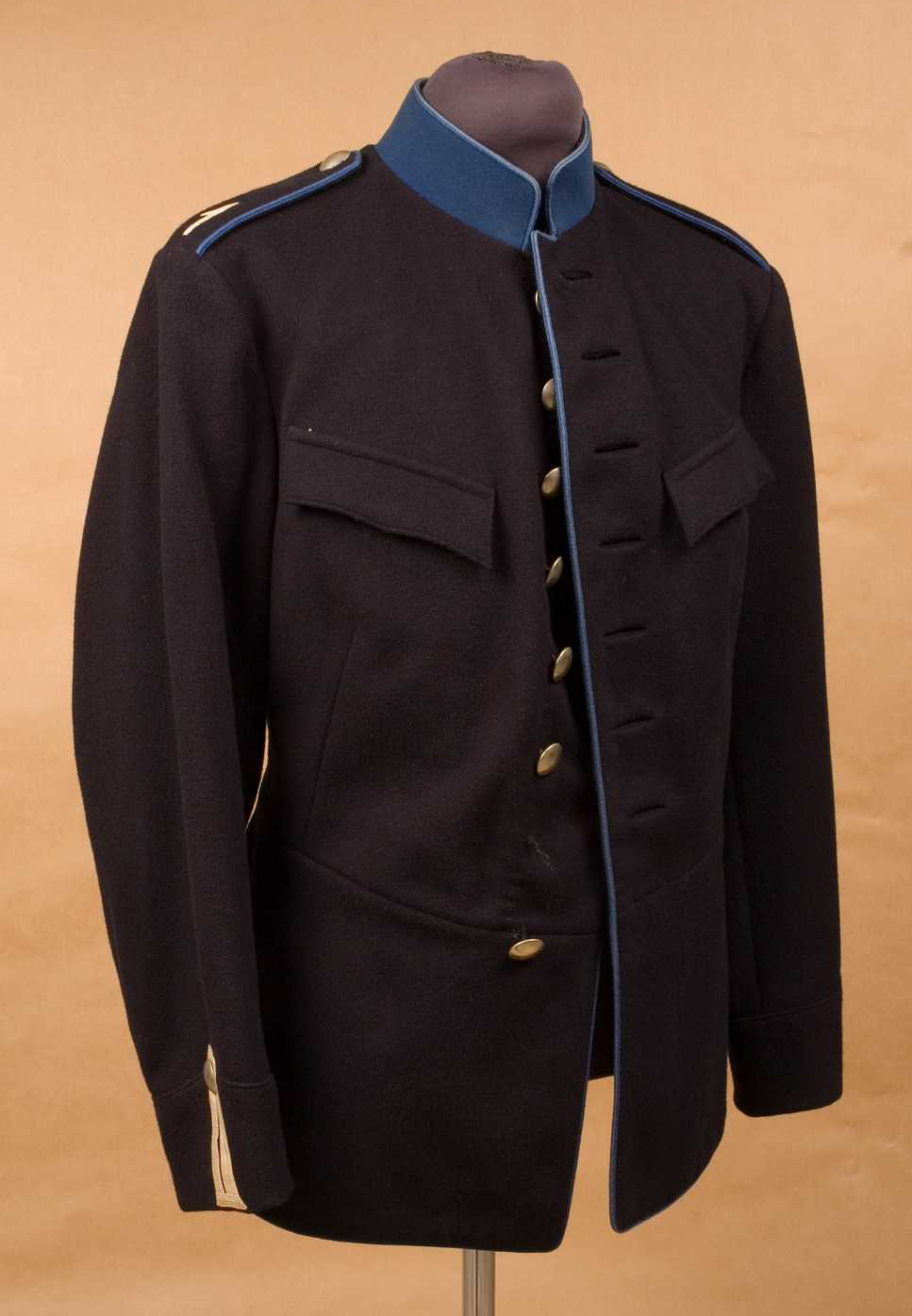
Tunic m/1895 type II for privates.

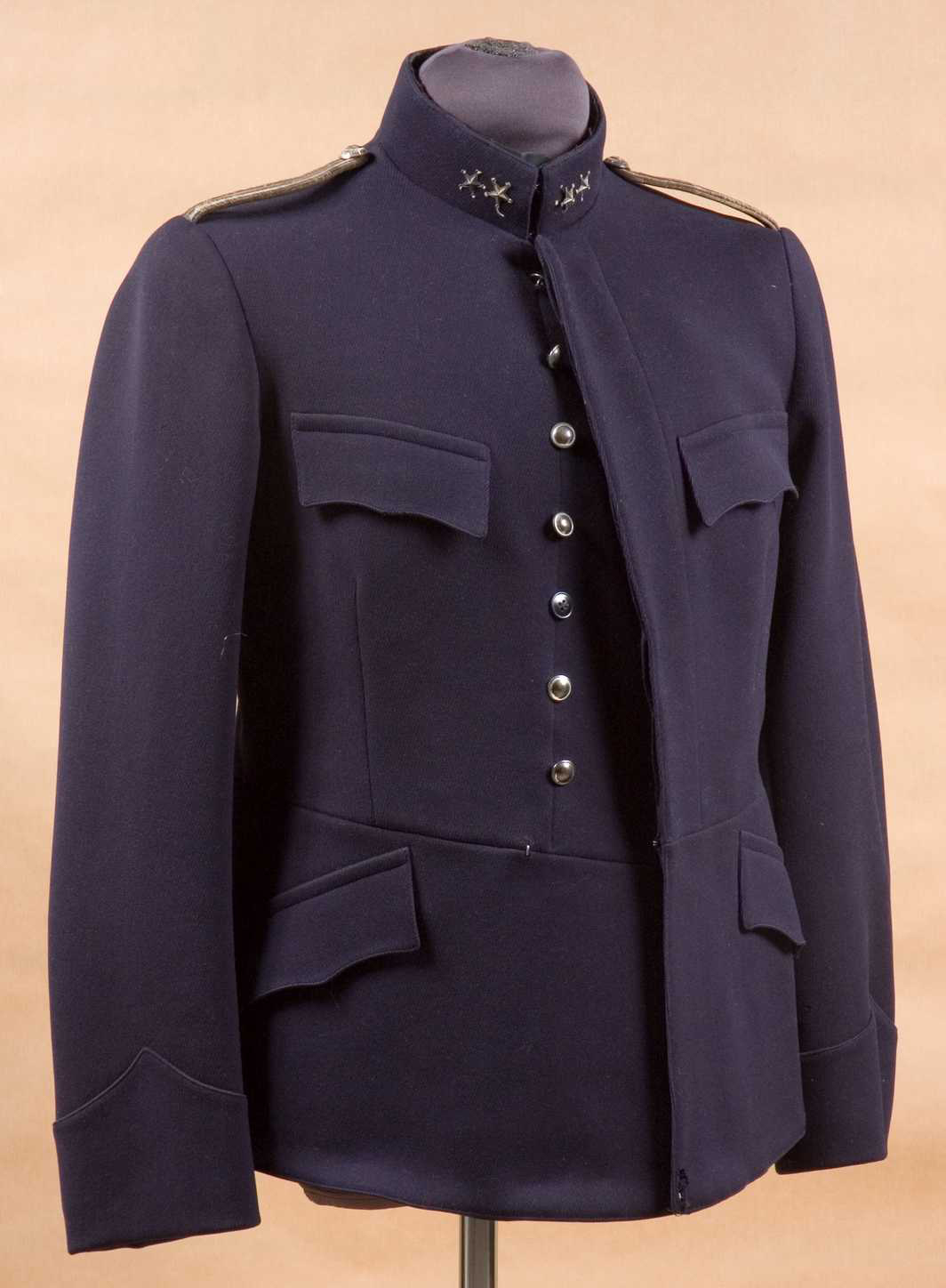
Stable jacket m/1871 for a lieutenant in the Svea Logistic Corps (T 1).

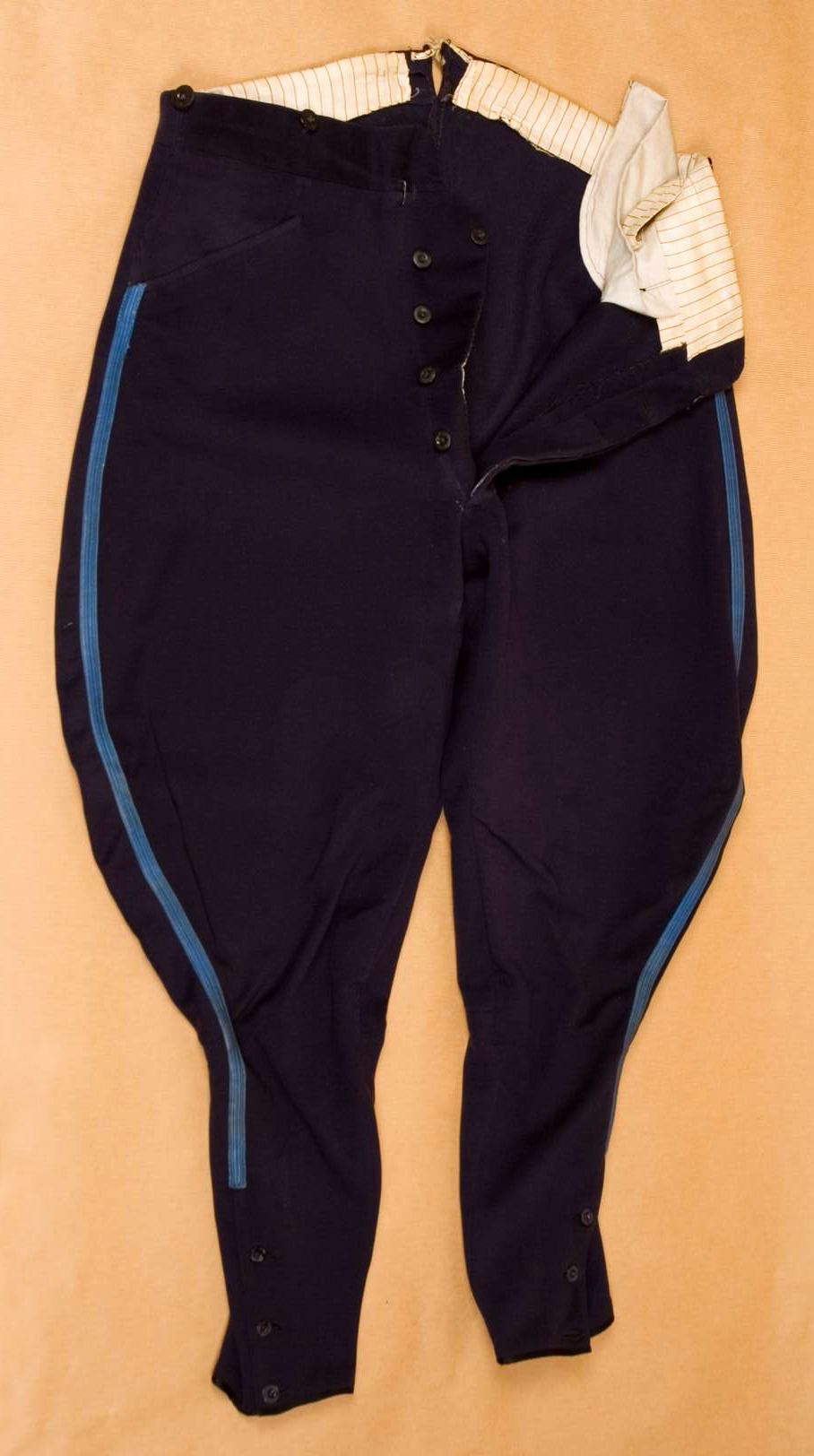
Riding breeches m/1895 for privates.

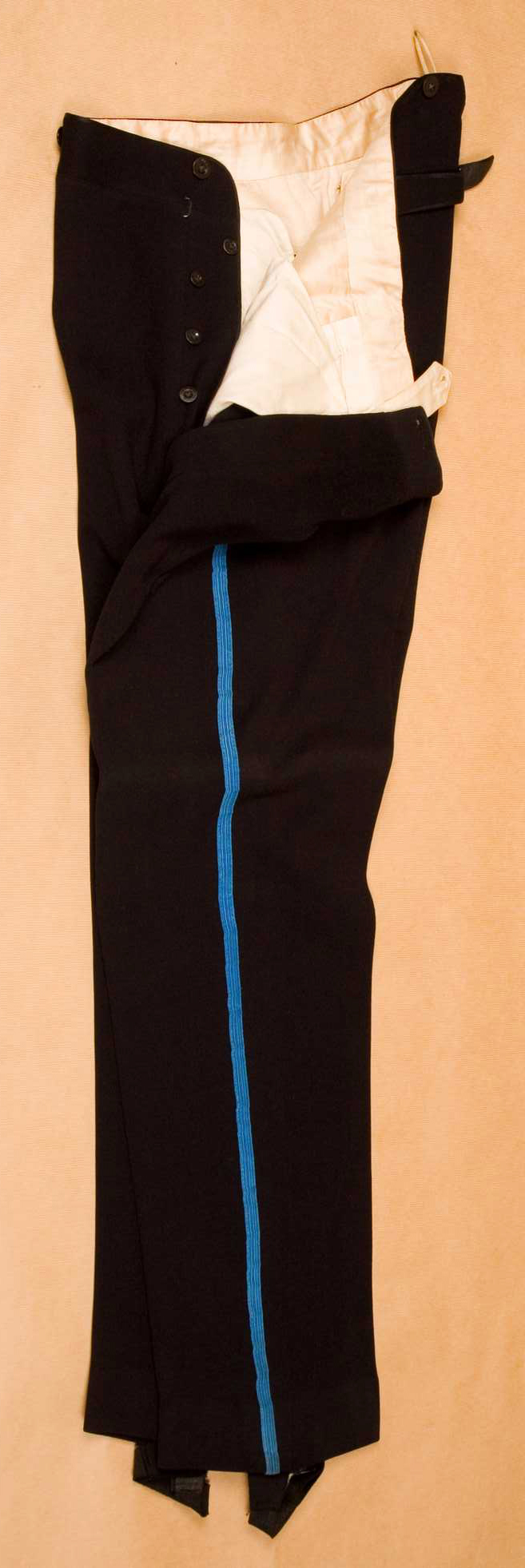
Long trousers m/1895 for officers.

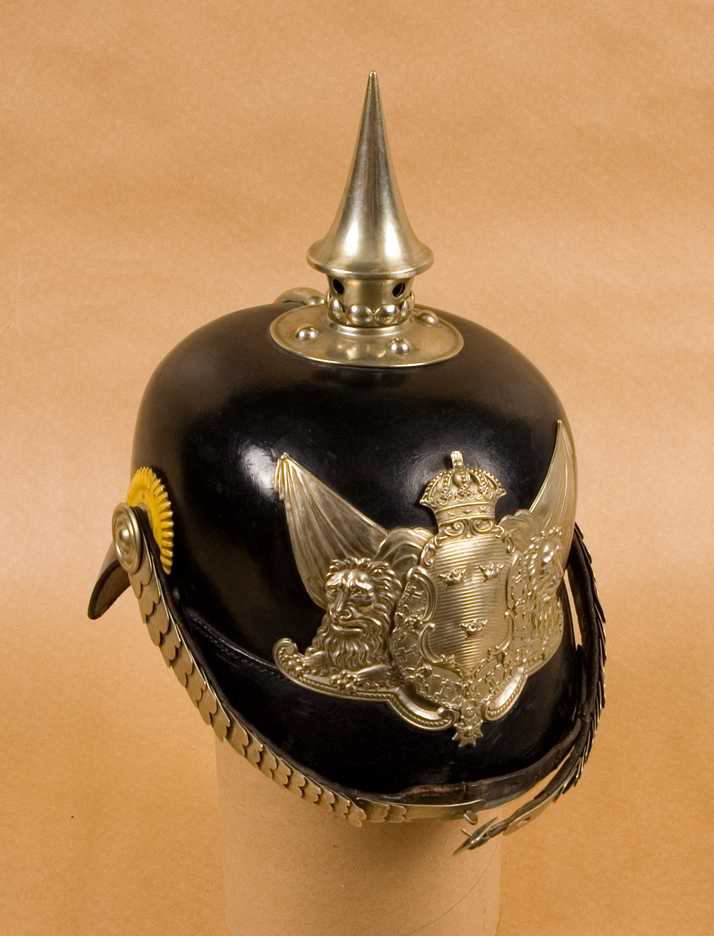
Helmet m/1885 for privates.

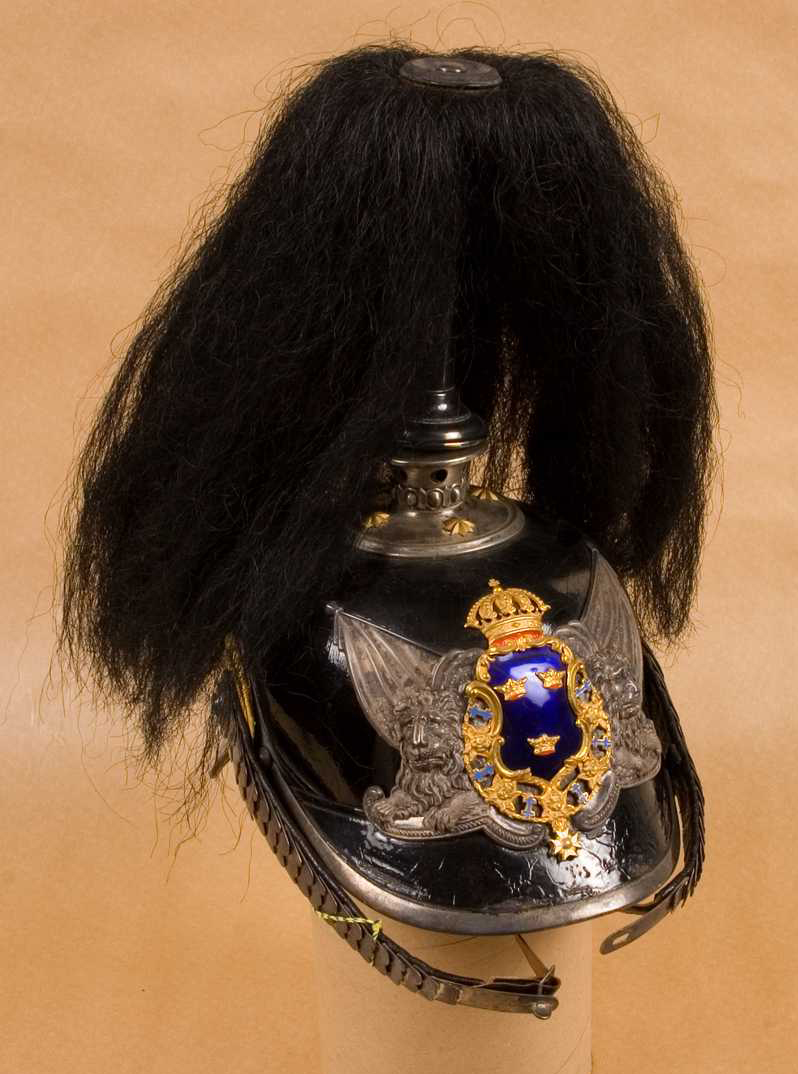
Helmet m/1885 with plume m/1885 for officers.

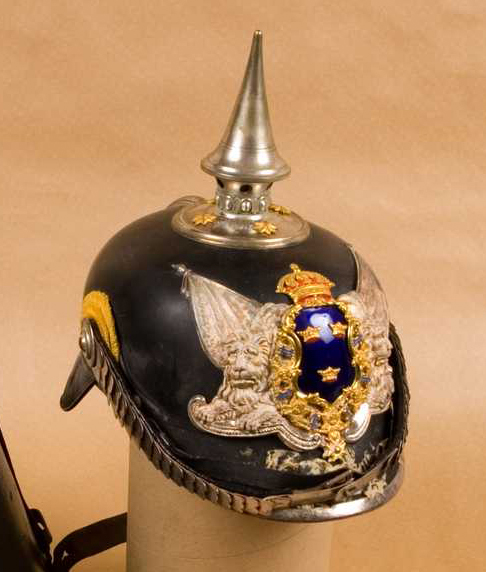
Helmet m/1885 for officers.

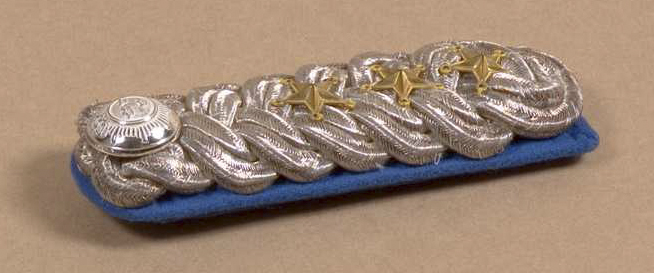
Shoulder strap m/1895 for colonel.

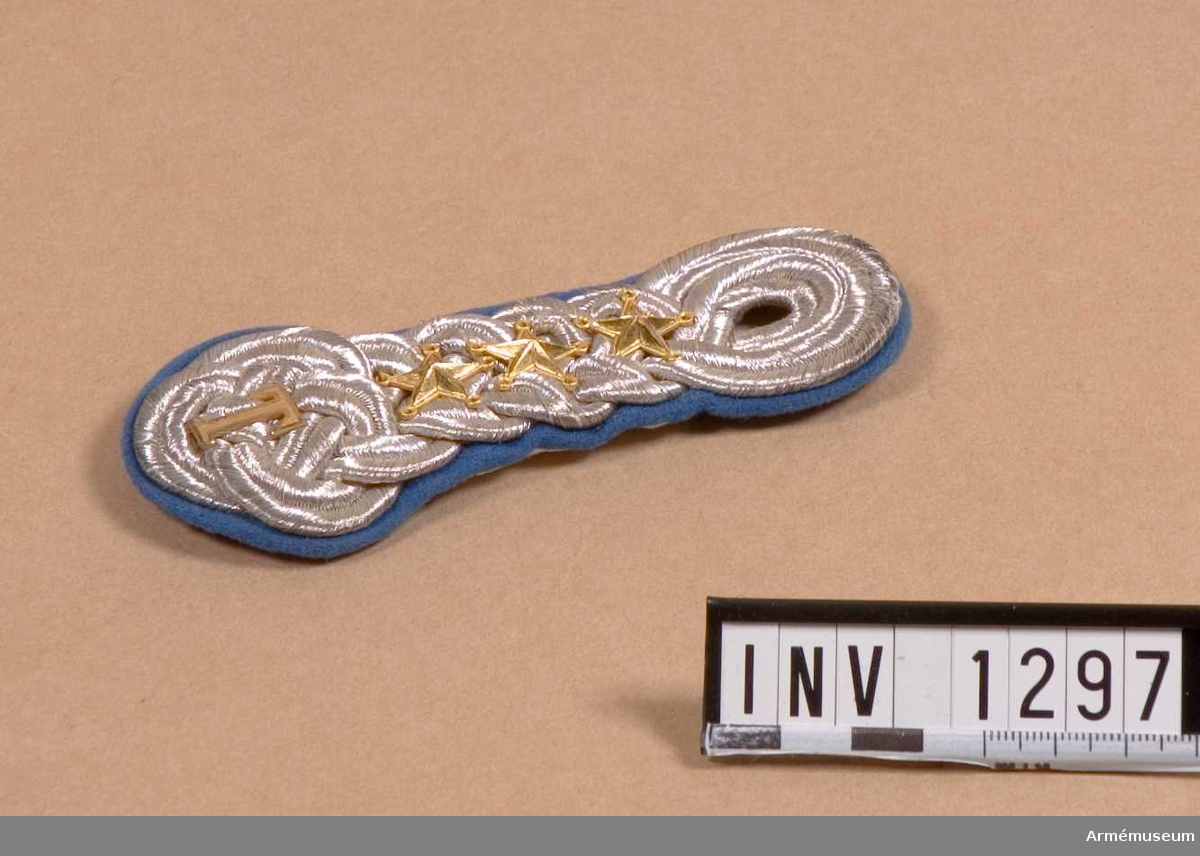
Shoulder mark m/1910 for colonel.

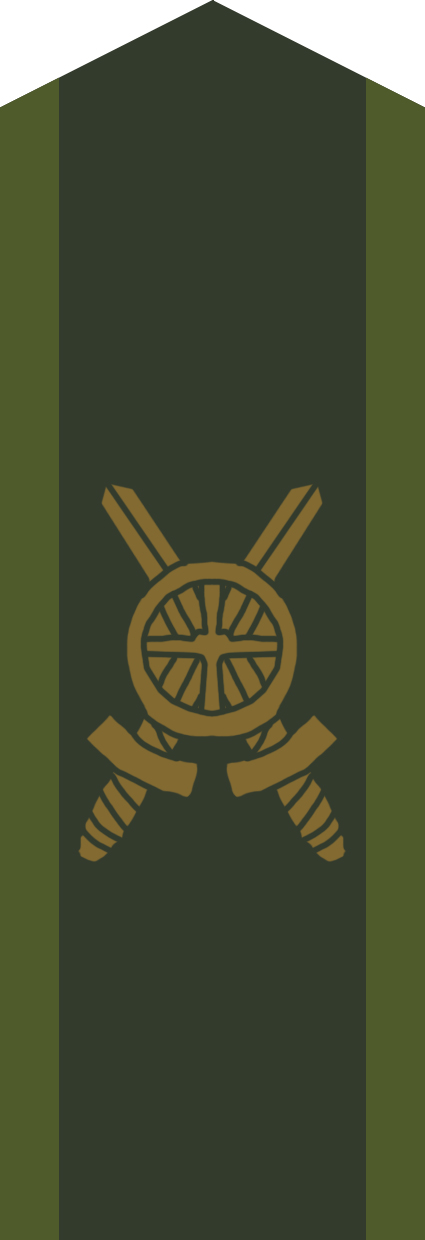
Collar patch m/1958.

== Inspector of the Swedish Army Service Troops ==
The chief of the service troops was referred to as the Inspector of the Swedish Army Service Troops (Tränginspektören, Trinsp). (Note: Also translated as the Transportation Corps Inspector. Before 1942 the branch was called Trängen and the inspector was then called Inspektören för trängen.) The inspector, who also held the power and authority of a regimental commander over the officers and non-commissioned officers of the service troops and their equivalents, had the rank of colonel. In his capacity as branch inspector, and regarding the training of the army service troops, he had the same duties and responsibilities as other inspectors. The inspector was assisted by a staff, the Army Service Troops Inspectorate (Tränginspektionen). The Inspector was from 1991 to 1997 the head of the Swedish Army Maintenance Center (Arméns underhållscentrum, UhC).

=== Officeholders ===
No.	Portrait	Name	Took office	Left office	Time in office	Chief of the Army Staff
1	Ivar Gewert	Major general (Note: Gewert was colonel when taking office in 1942 and was promoted to major general in 1945 while still in office.); Ivar Gewert (1891–1971)	1942	1946	3–4 years	Colonel; Henry Tottie; Major general Hugo Gadd
1	Gottfrid Björck	Colonel; Gottfrid Björck (1893–1981)	1946	1949	2–3 years	Major general Ivar Backlund; Major general Viking Tamm
1	Knut Hagberg	Colonel; Knut Hagberg (1895–1988)	1949	1956	6–7 years	Major general Viking Tamm; Major general Bert Carpelan
1	Adolf Norberg	Colonel; Adolf Norberg (1900–1988)	1956	1960	3–4 years	Major general Bert Carpelan; Major general Gustav Åkerman
1	Birger Hasselrot	Colonel; Birger Hasselrot (1905–2001)	1960	1965	4–5 years	Major general Gustav Åkerman; Major general Arne Mohlin; Major general Stig Synnergren
1	Magnus Bruzelius	Colonel; Magnus Bruzelius (1912–2004)	1965	1972	6–7 years	Major general Stig Synnergren; Major general Ove Ljung; Major general Karl Eric Holm
1	Dag Nordenskiöld	Senior colonel Dag Nordenskiöld (1913–1991)	1972	1974	1–2 years	Major general Lennart Ljung
1	Börje Wallberg	Senior colonel Börje Wallberg (1923–2014)	1974	1983	8–9 years	Major general Gösta Hökmark; Major general Robert Lugn
1	Curt Sjöö	Senior colonel Curt Sjöö (born 1937)	1983	1987	3–4 years	Major general Krister Larsson
1	Claës Tamm	Senior colonel Claës Tamm (born 1931)	1987	1991	3–4 years	Major general Krister Larsson; Major general Curt Sjöö
1	Ragnar Söderberg	Senior colonel Ragnar Söderberg (born 1935)	1991	1993	1–2 years	Major general Lennart Rönnberg
1	Lars Nordmark	Senior colonel Lars Nordmark (born 1938)	1993	1997	3–4 years	Major general Lennart Rönnberg

== See also ==
- Swedish Armoured Troops
- Swedish Engineer Troops
- Swedish Army Signal Troops
- List of Swedish logistic regiments
