= Karl Eric Holm =

Swedish Army officer

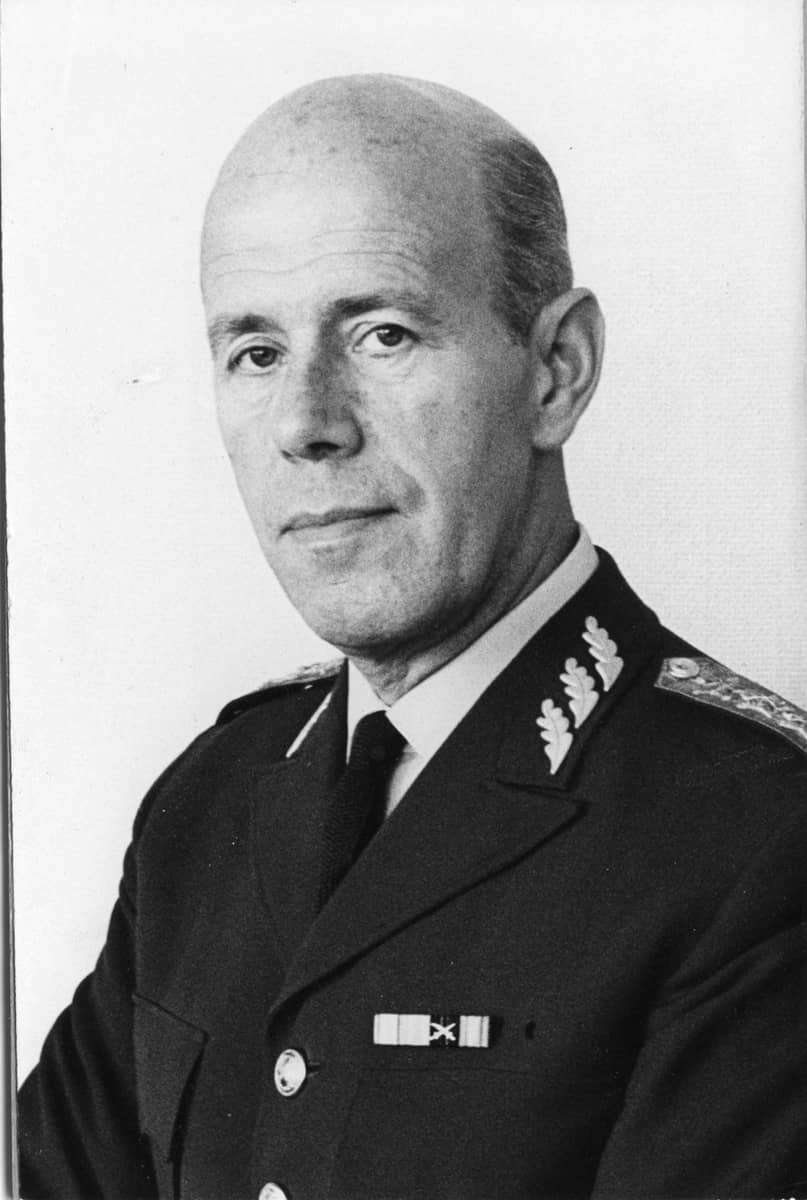
- Born: Karl Erik Holm; 3 June 1919; Falköping, Sweden
- Died: 27 July 2016 (aged 97); Stockholm, Sweden
- Military career
- Allegiance: Sweden
- Branch: Swedish Army
- Service years: 1941–1983
- Rank: Lieutenant General
- Unit: Volunteer Corps (1939-40)
- Commands: Norrbotten Regiment; Chief of the Army Staff; General Staff Corps; Southern Military District; Chief of Home Guard
- Conflicts: Winter War

Lieutenant General Karl Eric Holm (3 June 1919 – 27 July 2016) was a Swedish Army officer. His senior commands include Chief of the Army Staff and the General Staff Corps (1968–1972), military commander of the Southern Military District (1972–1980) and the Chief of Home Guard (1981–1983).

== Early life ==
Holm was born on 3 June 1919 in Falköping, Sweden, the son of Carl Holm, a station master, and his wife Olga (née Södergren). He passed studentexamen in Skövde in 1937 and then served in the Swedish Volunteer Corps during the Winter War in Finland from 1939 to 1940.

== Career ==
Holm was commissioned as an officer in the Swedish Army Service Troops in 1941 with the rank of fänrik in the Norrland Logistic Corps (T 3) in Sollefteå. Holm attended the Royal Swedish Army Staff College from 1949 to 1951 and the British Army Staff College in England in 1954. He was appointed captain in the General Staff Corps in 1955 and he served in the expert investigation regarding compulsory military service from 1956 to 1958. Holm served as captain in the Älvsborg Regiment (I 15) in 1958 and he was appointed major in the General Staff Corps in 1959. The same year he attended the Swedish National Defence College. Holm was a member of the 1960 Social Emergency Committee (Socialberedskapskommittéen) and he served as head of department in the Defence Staff from 1960. He was then promoted to lieutenant colonel in 1963 and served in the Life Regiment Grenadiers (I 3) before being appointed colonel in the Defence Staff in 1964. In 1965, Holm was appointed regimental commander of Norrbotten Regiment (I 19) in Boden and the year after he served as chief of staff of the Bergslagen Military District (Milo B).

He was promoted to major general and was appointed acting Chief of the Army Staff in 1966 and two years later he was appointed Chief of the Army Staff and the General Staff Corps, a position he held for four years. In August 1971, Holm inspected the Swedish Contingent serving with the United Nations Peacekeeping Force in Cyprus (UNFICYP). He also called on the Force Commander, major general B. F. Osorio-Tafall, and the chief of staff, brigadier general E.M.D. Leslie. In 1972, Holm was promoted to lieutenant general and was appointed military commander of the Southern Military District (Milo S). After eight years in this role, Holm was commanded to serve the Supreme Commander of the Swedish Armed Forces in 1980. The year after he was appointed Chief of Home Guard, serving from 1 January 1981 to 30 September 1983. As Chief of Home Guard, Holm undertook a reorganization of the National Home Guard Staff's (Rikshemvärnstaben) work, including a planning section to investigate the Home Guard's future organization. In 1982 discussions with the Swedish Navy were also initiated and the issue of setting up a Home Guard with naval tasks was raised. Holm retired from active service in 1983.

Holm was chairman of the Swedish Pistol Shooting Association (Svenska pistolskytteförbundet) from 1967 to 1973 and vice chairman of the Swedish Central Federation for Voluntary Military Training (Centralförbundet för befälsutbildning) from 1970 to 1981. He was also vice chairman of the National Association of Volunteer Motor Transport Corps from 1983 to 1985 and 1989 to 1991 as well as chairman of the same from 1985 to 1989. Holm was also on the board of the Swedish Armed Forces School for Secondary Education.

== Personal life ==
In 1943, Holm married Hedvig Wadstein (1920–2013), the daughter of tax collector J. Wadstein and Tekla Pierre. He was the father of Karin (born 1948) and Gunilla (born 1952).

== Dates of rank ==
- 1941 – Second Lieutenant
- 19?? – Lieutenant
- 1949 – Captain
- 1959 – Major
- 1963 – Lieutenant colonel
- 1964 – Colonel
- 1966 – Major general
- 1972 – Lieutenant general

== Awards and decorations ==
- (Sweden) Commander Grand Cross of the Order of the Sword (6 June 1973)
- (Sweden) Commander of the Order of the Sword (6 June 1967)
- (Finland) Finnish War Commemorative Medal (Finsk krigsminnesmedalj)
- (Finland) Finnish Commemorative Cross due to the Finnish War 1939-45 (Finskt minneskors med anledning av Finlands krig 1939-45)

== Honours ==
- Member of the Royal Swedish Academy of War Sciences (1963)
- Honorary member of the Swedish Pistol Shooting Association (Svenska pistolskytteförbundet)

== Bibliography ==
- Holm, Karl Eric (1996). Arméns motorisering och FAK:s utveckling (in Swedish). Stockholm: Frivilliga automobilkårernas riksförbund. SELIBR 11822864.
- Holm, Karl Eric (1965). Kan småstaten försvara sig?. Försvar i nutid, 0046-4643; 1965:3 (in Swedish). Stockholm: Centralförb. Folk och försvar. SELIBR 874513.

Military offices
Preceded by Ove Ljung	Chief of the Army Staff General Staff Corps; 1968–1972	Succeeded by Lennart Ljung
Preceded by Oscar Krokstedt	Southern Military District; 1972–1980	Succeeded by Sven-Olof Olson
Preceded by Fredrik Löwenhielm	Chief of Home Guard; 1981–1983	Succeeded by Robert Lugn
