= Curt Sjöö =

Swedish military personnel

- Born: Curt Ove Leonard Sjöö; 16 March 1937 (age 89); Eksjö, Sweden
- Military career
- Allegiance: Sweden
- Branch: Swedish Army
- Service years: 1958–1996
- Rank: Lieutenant General
- Commands: Military Academy Karlberg; Swedish Army Service Troops; Chief of the Army Staff; Upper Norrland Military District; Northern Military District
- Conflicts: Cyprus conflict
- Other work: Chief of His Majesty's Military Staff

Lieutenant General Curt Ove Leonard Sjöö (born 16 March 1937) is a retired Swedish Army officer. Sjöö's senior commands include Chief of the Army Staff (1988–1990) and military commander of the Upper Norrland Military District (1990–1992) and of the Northern Military District (1993–1996). He also served as Chief of His Majesty's Military Staff from 1997 to 2003.

== Early life ==
Sjöö was born on 16 March 1937 in Eksjö Parish, Jönköping County, Sweden, the son of Ernst Sjöö and his wife Ester (née Isaksson). He passed studentexamen in Eksjö in 1955. He finished third is his class at the Military Academy Karlberg when he graduated in September 1958.

== Career ==
Sjöö was commissioned as an officer in the Scanian Logistic Regiment (T 4) in 1958 with the rank of second lieutenant. He served in the Swedish Army School of Logistics (Arméns underhållsskola, US) and attended the Swedish Armed Forces Staff College from 1966 to 1969 and then served in the Army Staff and the Defence Staff between 1969 and 1978. Between 1973 and 1974 he served in the Swedish UN battalion in Cyprus, part of the United Nations Peacekeeping Force in Cyprus (UNFICYP). He served in the Norrland Logistic Regiment in Sollefteå when he was appointed as a regimental officer in Ar 29 in the Defence Staff and from 1 May 1974 appointed as a major in the General Staff Corps. On 1 October 1974, he was appointed lieutenant colonel in the General Staff Corps. During April 1975, he served as ADC on duty to His Majesty the King Carl XVI Gustaf, including during his visit to Denmark. On 25 April 1975, Sjöö was ordered to be available as an expert in the commission Kvinnan och försvarets yrken ("Women and military professions") (SOU 1977:26). During November 1978, he served as ADC of duty to His Majesty the King.

Sjöö served as battalion commander in the Svea Logistic Regiment (T 1) in Linköping from 1978 to 1980. On 1 April 1980 he was promoted to colonel and assumed the position as head of the Military Academy Karlberg. In March 1983, Sjöö was elected chairman of the Trängklubben, an association of military logistic officers in active service and in the reserve. On 1 April 1983, Sjöö was promoted to senior colonel and assumed the position of Inspector of the Swedish Army Service Troops. In May 1983, Sjöö became a board member of the National Society for Road Safety. Sjöö was section chief in the staff of the Western Military District (Milo V) from 1987 to 1988 and on 1 October 1988, Sjöö was promoted to major general and assumed the position of Chief of the Army Staff. On 1 April 1990, Sjöö was promoted to lieutenant general and assumed the position of military commander of the Upper Norrland Military District, succeeding lieutenant general Åke Sagrén on the post. In 1993, the Upper Norrland Military District (Milo ÖN) and the Lower Norrland Military District (Milo NN) amalgamated and created the Northern Military District (Milo N) of which Sjöö became commander. His appointment was prolonged on 1 July 1994. He left the position and retired in 1996. On 1 April 1997, Sjöö took office as Chief of His Majesty's Military Staff. He served in this position until 2003.

== Personal life ==
On 14 June 1958, Sjöö got engaged to Birgitta Sköld. In 1960, he married Birgitta Sköld (born 1936), the daughter of major Nils Sköld and Karin (née Fredriksson).

== Dates of rank ==
- 1958 – Second lieutenant
- 19?? – Lieutenant
- 1966 – Captain
- 1972 – Major
- 1 October 1974 – Lieutenant colonel
- 1 April 1980 – Colonel
- 1 April 1983 – Senior colonel
- 1 October 1988 – Major general
- 1 April 1990 – Lieutenant general

== Awards and decorations ==
=== Swedish ===
- (Sweden) H. M. The King's Medal, 12th size gold (silver-gilt) medal worn around the neck on the Royal Order of the Seraphim ribbon (28 January 2002)

=== Foreign ===
- (Iceland) Grand Cross of the Order of the Falcon (24 November 1998)
- (Italy) 1st Class / Knight Grand Cross of the Order of Merit of the Italian Republic (5 May 1998)
- (Argentina) Grand Cross of the Order of May (4 June 1998)
- Grand Decoration of Honour in Silver with Sash for Services to the Republic of Austria (25 September 1997)
- United Nations Medal (UNFICYP) (1974)

== Honours ==
- Member of the Royal Swedish Academy of War Sciences (1983)
- Honorary member of the Swedish Pistol Shooting Association (Svenska pistolskytteförbundet)

Military offices
| Preceded by Rolf Frykhammar | Military Academy Karlberg; 1980–1983 | Succeeded by Matts Uno Liljegren |
| Preceded by Börje Wallberg | Inspector of the Swedish Army Service Troops; 1983–1987 | Succeeded by Claes Tamm |
| Preceded by Krister Larsson | Chief of the Army Staff; 1988–1990 | Succeeded by Lennart Rönnberg |
| Preceded by Åke Sagrén | Upper Norrland Military District; 1990–1992 | Succeeded by Carl-Ivar Pesula |
| Preceded by None | Northern Military District; 1993–1996 | Succeeded by Lars G. Persson |
Court offices
| Preceded by Bror Stefenson | Chief of His Majesty's Military Staff; 1997–2003 | Succeeded by Frank Rosenius |
