= Hugo Gadd =

Swedish Army officer (1885–1968)

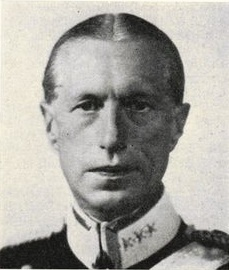
- Born: Hugo Adolf Magnus Christoffer Gadd; 13 March 1885; Malmö, Sweden
- Died: 13 December 1968 (aged 83); Stockholm, Sweden
- Military career
- Allegiance: Sweden
- Branch: Swedish Army
- Service years: 1906–1946
- Rank: Major General
- Commands: Wendes Artillery Regiment; Chief of the Army Staff; General Staff Corps

Major General Hugo Adolf Magnus Christoffer Gadd (13 March 1885 – 13 December 1968) was a senior Swedish Army officer.

== Early life ==
Gadd was born on 13 March 1885 in Malmö, Sweden, the son of Christoffer Gadd, a wholesaler, and his wife Augusta Lammers.

== Career ==
Gadd was commissioned as an officer in 1906 and was assigned to Göta Artillery Regiment with the rank of underlöjtnant. He attended the Artillery and Engineering College from 1908 to 1909 and the Royal Swedish Army Staff College from 1913 to 1914. Gadd was then assigned to the General Staff as an officer aspirant from 1916 to 1918. In 1918, Gadd conducted a war history study trip to Kliszów, Poland. He became captain of the General Staff in 1920 and served as a staff adjutant and then as a teacher at the Artillery and Engineering College from 1920 to 1928 when he was promoted to major and appointed head of the General Staff's Organization Department.

In 1932, Gadd was promoted to lieutenant colonel of the General Staff and appointed senior adjutant. The same year he was appointed Vice Chief of the Military Office of the Land Defence (Lantförsvarets kommandoexpedition). In 1935, Gadd was promoted to colonel and assumed the position of regimental commander of Wendes Artillery Regiment in Kristianstad. Gadd then served as Deputy Division Commander of the 1st Army Division (I. arméfördelningen) in Kristianstad and in 1942 he received the corresponding post as Deputy Military Commander of the I Military District. He was promoted to major general in 1942 and served from 1943 to 1946 as Chief of the Army Staff and of the General Staff Corps, after which Gadd retired from the military. After his retirement, Gadd became chairman of the Swedish Women's Auxiliary Veterinary Corps (Svenska Blå Stjärnan) and its central board in 1949.

== Personal life ==
In 1916, he married Margot Hill-Lindquist (1894–1944), the daughter of Herman Lindquist and Maggie Hill.

== Death ==
Gadd died on 13 December 1968 in Stockholm. He was interred at Stadskyrkogården in Alingsås in 1969.

== Dates of rank ==
- 1906 – Underlöjtnant
- 1912 – Lieutenant
- 1920 – Captain
- 1928 – Major
- 1932 – Lieutenant colonel
- 1935 – Colonel
- 1942 – Major general

== Awards and decorations ==
=== Swedish ===
- (Sweden) King Gustaf V's Jubilee Commemorative Medal (1928)
- (Sweden) Commander 1st Class of the Order of the Sword (15 November 1941)
- (Sweden) Knight of the Order of the Polar Star
- (Sweden) Knight of the Order of Vasa
- (Sweden) Swedish Voluntary Motor Transport Corps Medal of Merit in gold
- (Sweden) Swedish Women's Auxiliary Veterinary Corps Medal of Merit (Svenska Blå Stjärnans förtjänstmedalj)
- (Sweden) Landstorm Medal of Merit (Landstormens förtjänstmedalj)
- (Sweden) Swedish Red Cross Medal of Merit (Svenska Röda Korsets förtjänstmedalj)

=== Foreign ===
- Commander of the Order of the White Rose of Finland
- (Poland) Commander Second Class of the Order of Polonia Restituta
- (France) Officer of the Legion of Honour

== Honours ==
- Member of the Royal Swedish Academy of War Sciences (1930)

Military offices
Preceded by Henry Tottie	Chief of the Army Staff General Staff Corps; 1943–1946	Succeeded by Ivar Backlund
