= Ivar Backlund =

Swedish Army officer (1892–1969)

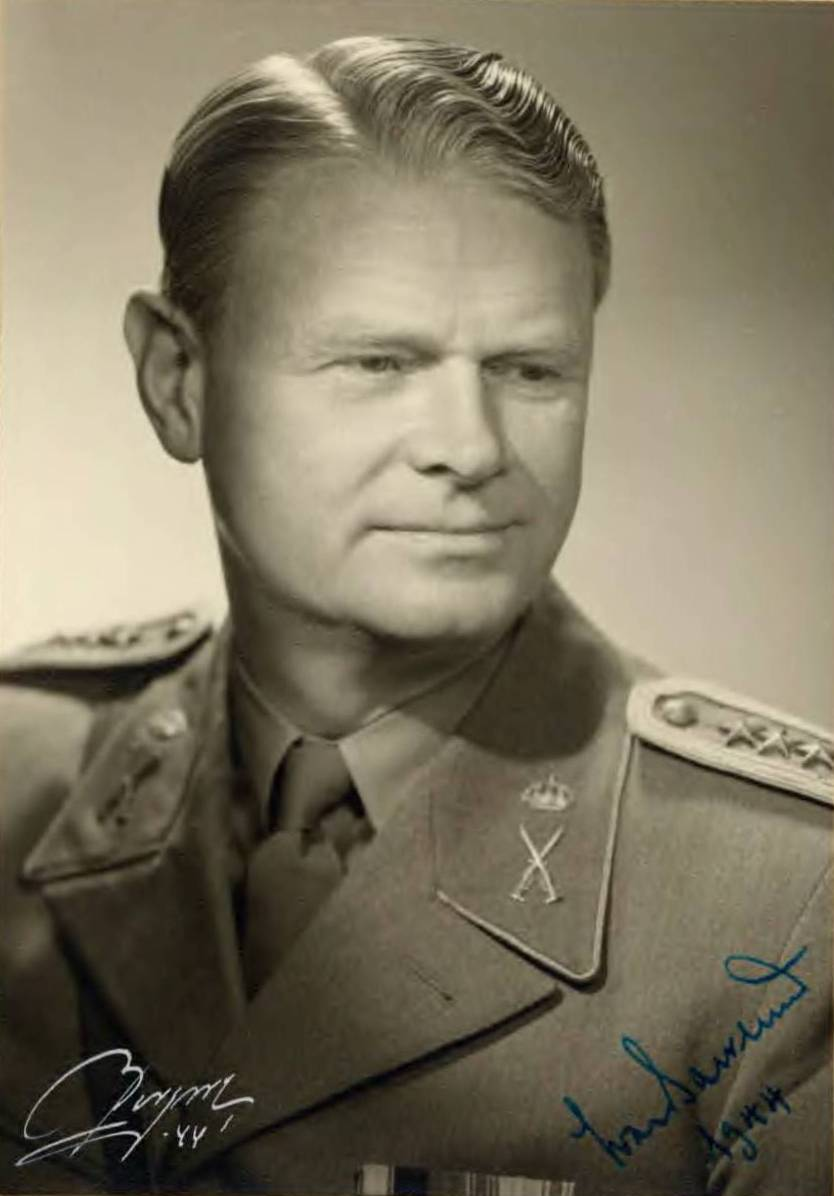
- Backlund as colonel in 1944.
- Born: Gustav Ivar Backlund; 14 February 1892; Gothenburg, Sweden
- Died: 5 July 1969 (aged 77); Stockholm, Sweden
- Military career
- Allegiance: Sweden
- Branch: Swedish Army
- Service years: 1912–1957
- Rank: Lieutenant General
- Commands: Dalarna Regiment; Boden Fortress; Chief of the Army Staff; General Staff Corps; VII Military District; Swedish National Defence College

Lieutenant General Gustav Ivar Backlund (14 February 1892 – 5 July 1969) was a senior Swedish Army officer. Backlund began his military career in 1912, rising to the rank of captain by 1924. He held various roles, including adjutant to the Ministry of Defence and teacher at the Artillery and Engineering College. Promoted to colonel in 1939, he became the regimental commander of the Dalarna Regiment. In 1944, Backlund served as Commandant in Boden Fortress and held a key role in the IV Military District from 1944 to 1946. He achieved the rank of major general in 1946 and served as Chief of the Army Staff until 1948. Later, he became the military commander of the VII Military District until 1955 and headed the Swedish National Defence College until 1956, retiring as a lieutenant general in 1957.

== Early life ==
Backlund was born on 14 February 1892 in Gothenburg, Sweden, the son of Anders Backlund, a phytosanitary inspector, and his wife Thérese Floberg. He passed studentexamen in 1909.

== Career ==
Backlund was commissioned as an officer in 1912 and was assigned with the rank of underlöjtnant to Göta Life Guards (I 2). He attended the Royal Swedish Army Staff College from 1918 to 1920 and served as captain in the General Staff in 1924. Backlund was adjutant to the head of the Ministry of Defence from 1926 to 1928 and served as a general staff officer in the Militärläroverksinspektionen from 1928 to 1933. Backlund was teacher at the Artillery and Engineering College from 1933 to 1937 and was promoted to major in 1934. He was then serving as vice chief of the Military Office of the Land Defence (Lantförsvarets kommandoexpedition) from 1937 to 1939 and he was promoted to lieutenant colonel in 1937.

Backlund served in Södermanland Infantry Regiment (I 10) in 1939 and the year after he was promoted to colonel and was appointed regimental commander of the Dalarna Regiment (I 13). In 1944, Backlund was appointed Commandant in Boden Fortress and he served as acting deputy military commander of the IV Military District from 1944 to 1946. He was promoted to major general in 1946 and served as Chief of the Army Staff and the General Staff Corps from 1946 to 1948. Backlund was military commander of the VII Military District from 1 October 1948 to 31 March 1955 and head of the Swedish National Defence College from 1 April 1955 to 1956. He was promoted to lieutenant general in 1957 and retired from the military.

He became chairman of the Swedish Pistol-shooting Association (Svenska pistolskytteförbundet) in 1946 and the Educational Swedish Swimming Association (Svenska livräddningssällskapet) in 1947.

== Personal life ==
In 1935, he married Margareta Troili (born 1904), the daughter of Eilert Troili, an accountant, and Gunhild Behmer.

== Dates of rank ==
- 1912 – Underlöjtnant
- 19?? – Lieutenant
- 1924 – Captain
- 1934 – Major
- 1937 – Lieutenant colonel
- 1940 – Colonel
- 1946 – Major general
- 1957 – Lieutenant general

== Awards and decorations ==
=== Swedish ===
- (Sweden) Commander Grand Cross of the Order of the Sword (6 June 1953)
- (Sweden) Commander 1st Class of the Order of the Sword (6 June 1946)
- (Sweden) Commander 2nd Class of the Order of the Sword (15 November 1943)
- (Sweden) Knight 1st Class of the Order of the Sword (1933)
- (Sweden) Knight of the Order of the Polar Star (1939)
- (Sweden) Knight 1st Class of the Order of Vasa (1928)
- (Sweden) Medal for Noble Deeds (För medborgerlig förtjänst) in gold

=== Foreign ===
- Commander of the Order of the White Rose of Finland (between 1940 and 1942)
- Commander Second Class of the Order of the White Rose of Finland (between 1935 and 1940)
- Commander of the Order of the Lion of Finland (between 1947 and 1950)
- (Nazi Germany) 1st Class of the Order of the German Eagle (1942)
- (Belgium) Knight of the Order of Leopold (between 1925 and 1928)

== Honours ==
- Member of the Royal Swedish Academy of War Sciences (1938)

Military offices
Preceded by Anders Andén	Dalarna Regiment; 1940–1944	Succeeded by Olof Häger
Preceded by Gustaf Dyrssen	Commandant in Boden Fortress; 1944–1946	Succeeded by Sven Erik Allstrin
Preceded by Hugo Gadd	Chief of the Army Staff; General Staff Corps; 1946–1948	Succeeded by Viking Tamm
Preceded by Samuel Åkerhielm	VII Military District; 1948–1955	Succeeded by Thord Bonde
Preceded by Thord Bonde	Swedish National Defence College; 1955–1956	Succeeded by Gustaf Adolf Westring
