= Folke Högberg =

Swedish Army officer (1884–1972)

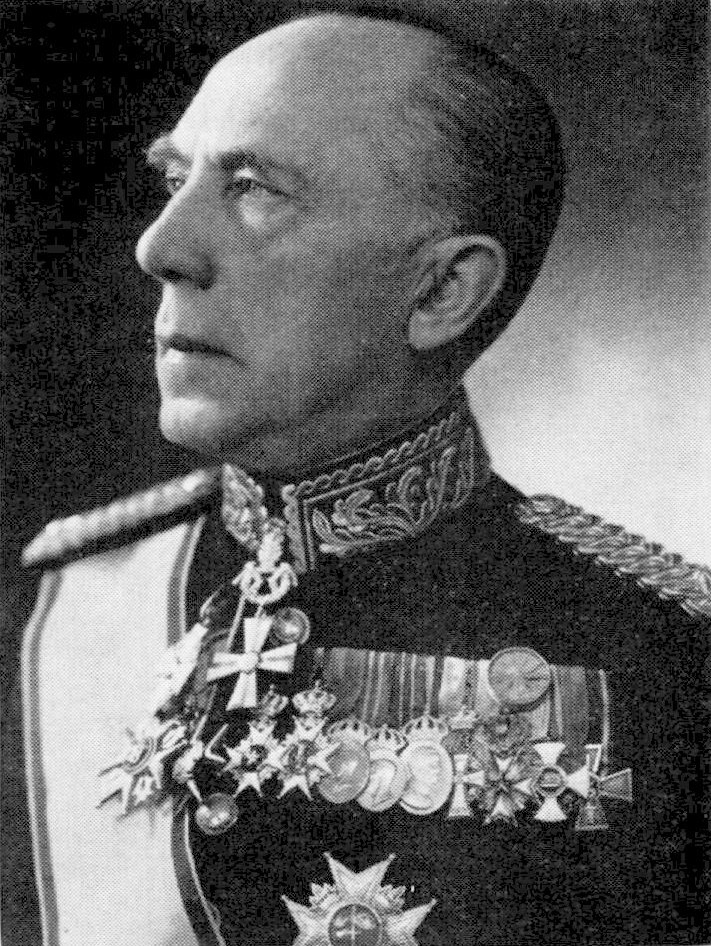
- Born: 20 March 1884; Helsingborg, Sweden
- Died: 8 June 1972 (aged 88); Skövde, Sweden
- Military career
- Allegiance: Sweden
- Branch: Swedish Army
- Service years: 1905–1949
- Rank: Lieutenant General
- Commands: Royal Swedish Army Staff College; Västernorrland Regiment; Boden Fortress; Chief of the Army Staff; General Staff Corps; III Military District

Lieutenant General Folke Högberg (20 March 1884 – 8 June 1972) was a Swedish Army officer. Högberg's senior commands include regimental commander of Västernorrland Regiment, commendant of Boden Fortress, Chief of the Army Staff and military commander of the III Military District.

== Early life ==
Högberg was born on 20 March 1884 in Helsingborg, Sweden, the son of Knut Högberg, a postmaster, and his wife Anna (née Borg).

== Career ==
Högberg was commissioned as an officer in the Kronoberg Regiment (I 11) with the rank of underlöjtnant in 1905. He was promoted to lieutenant in 1907 and to captain in 1917, the same year he served in the General Staff. Högberg served as teacher of military history at the Royal Swedish Army Staff College from 1922 to 1926, and in 1923 he served in the Göta Life Guards (I 2). He also served as secretary of experts for new enrollment regulations with several conscript statutes from 1925 to 1926. Högberg was major and served in the General Staff in 1926 and as chief of staff of 1st Army Division (I. arméfördelningen) from 1926 to 1930. He was promoted to lieutenant colonel in 1930 and was appointed vice chief of the Military Office of the Land Defense (Lantförsvarets kommandoexpedition).

In 1932, Högberg was appointed head of the Royal Swedish Army Staff College and three years later he was promoted to colonel and was appointed regimental commander of Västernorrland Regiment (I 21) in Sollefteå. During this time, Högberg was also Inspektor of Sollefteå Samrealskola from 1936 to 1937. Högberg was promoted to major general in 1937 and was appointed commandant in Boden Fortress. In 1940, he became Chief of the Army Staff and the General Staff Corps. Högberg became military commander of the III Military District in 1942. He stayed in this positions until 1949 when he was promoted to lieutenant general and retired from active service.

== Later life ==
The year before retiring from the military, Högberg took up a position as Inspektor of the municipal girls' school in Skövde. Högberg was chairman of Skövde hembygdsförening ("Skövde Local History Society") from 1951 to 1969. In autumn of 1954, he led the work on the excavation of Helena of Skövde's chapel and spring.

== Personal life ==
In 1909, he married Ellen Johanson (1885–1976), the daughter of ironmonger Sven Johanson and his wife Mathilda Sundström. They had three children; Karin (born 1910), Anne-Marie (1914–2010) and Eva (1922–2000).

== Death ==
Högberg died on 8 June 1972 and was buried at S:ta Elins kyrkogård ("Helena of Skövde's Cemetery") in Skövde, in the same family grave as his wife and two of his daughters.

== Dates of rank ==
- 1905 – Underlöjtnant
- 1907 – Lieutenant
- 1917 – Captain
- 1926 – Major
- 1930 – Lieutenant colonel
- 1935 – Colonel
- 1937 – Major general
- 1949 – Lieutenant general

== Awards and decorations ==
=== Swedish ===
- (Sweden) Commander Grand Cross of the Order of the Sword (15 November 1944)
- (Sweden) Knight of the Order of the Polar Star (1935)
- (Sweden) Knight of the Order of Vasa (1931)
- (Sweden) Federation of Landstorm Associations Medal of Merit in gold (1942)
- (Sweden) Federation of Landstorm Associations Medal of Merit in silver (1932)
- (Sweden) Voluntary Motor Transportation Corps Medal of Merit in gold (Frivilliga Automobilkårens förtjänstmedalj i guld) (1943)
- (Sweden) Västergötland Ancient Monument Association Medal of Merit (Västergötlands forminnesförenings förtjänstmedalj) (1961)

=== Foreign ===
- (Finland) 1st Class of the Order of the Cross of Liberty with swords
- (Finland) 1st Class of the Order of the Cross of Liberty with oak leaf
- (Estonia) 3rd Class of the Order of the Cross of the Eagle
- Commander of the Order of the White Rose of Finland
- (Norway) Commander of the Order of St. Olav
- (Denmark) Knight of the Order of the Dannebrog
- (France) Officer of the Order of the Black Star
- Knight of the Order of the Crown of Italy

== Honours ==
- Member of the Royal Swedish Academy of War Sciences (1934)
- Corresponding member of the Royal Swedish Academy of Letters, History and Antiquities (5 February 1957, no 194)
- Honorary Doctor of Philosophy, University of Gothenburg (22 October 1966)
- Corresponding member of the Royal Gustavus Adolphus Academy (1967)

== Bibliography ==
- Högberg, Folke (1967). Hooks herrgård: historik i kort sammanfattning (in Swedish) ([Ny, kompletterad uppl.] ed.). [Hok]: [Hooks herrgård]. SELIBR 1711040.
- Högberg, Folke (1965). Medeltida absidkyrkor i Norden: en studie särskilt anknuten till Västergötland. Skövdeortens hembygds- och fornminnesförenings skriftserie, 99-0876542-6; 10 (in Swedish). Stockholm. SELIBR 848471.
- Högberg, Folke (1962). Hooks historia: kort sammanfattning (in Swedish). Hok: [Hooks herrgård]. SELIBR 1925693.
- Högberg, Folke (1960). Stavkorshällar och liljestenar i Västergötland. Skövdeortens hembygds- och fornminnesförenings skriftserie, 99-0876542-6; 8 (in Swedish). Skövde. SELIBR 772427.

Military offices
| Preceded by Gustaf Lagerfelt | Boden Fortress; 1937–1940 | Succeeded by Helmer Bratt |
| Preceded by Helge Jung | Chief of the Army Staff; General Staff Corps; 1940–1942 | Succeeded by Henry Tottie |
| Preceded by None | III Military District; 1942–1949 | Succeeded by Sven Ryman |
