= Stig Synnergren =

Swedish general and supreme commander

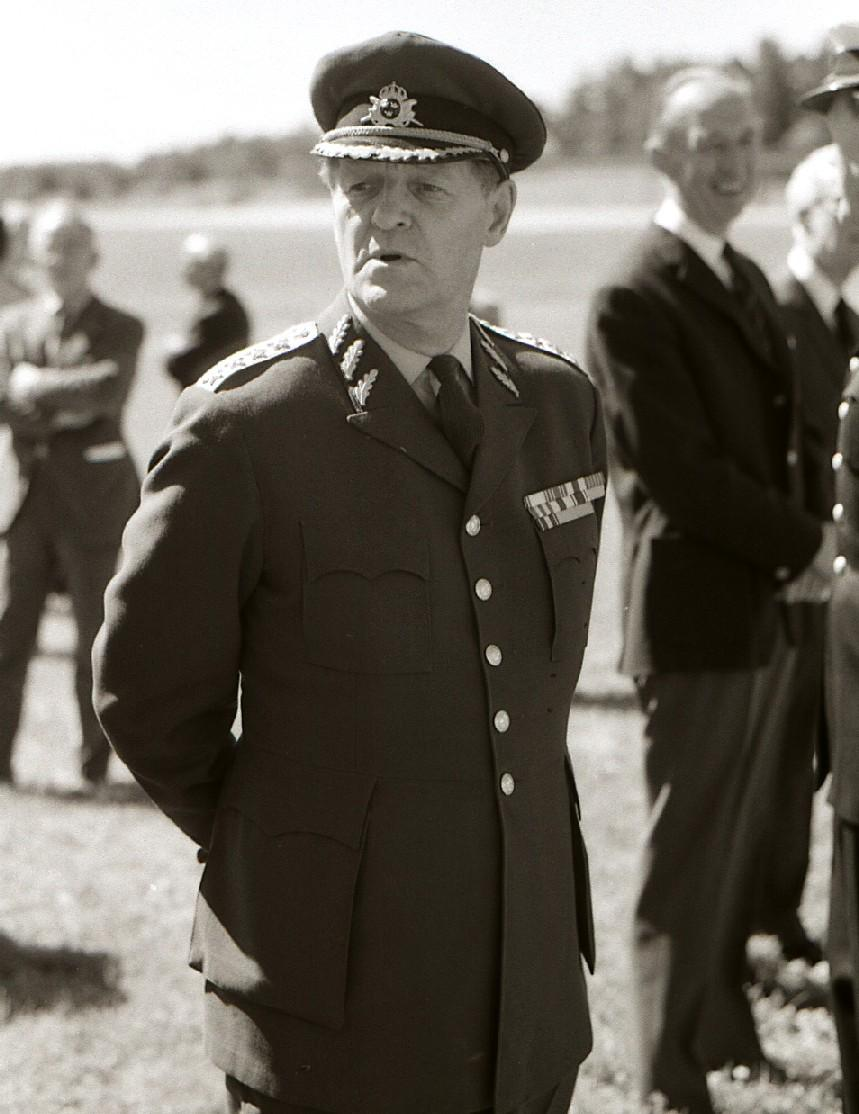
- Synnergren in 1974
- Born: Stig Gustaf Eugén Synnergren; 25 February 1915; Boden, Sweden
- Died: 29 April 2004 (aged 89); Stockholm, Sweden
- Burial place: Galärvarvskyrkogården
- Military career
- Allegiance: Sweden
- Branch: Swedish Army
- Service years: 1939–1978
- Rank: General
- Commands: Chief of the Army Staff; General Staff Corps; Bergslagen Military District; Chief of the Defence Staff; Supreme Commander
- Other work: Chief of His Majesty's Military Staff

General Stig Gustaf Eugén Synnergren (25 February 1915 – 29 April 2004) was a senior Swedish Army officer. Synnergren had an illustrious military career that began in 1939 as a second lieutenant. He played a pivotal role during World War II, serving in the Ski Battalion and conducting intelligence operations in Northern Norway after the German occupation of Narvik. His exceptional skills and experience led him to manage the evacuation of Norwegian refugees in Jokkmokk.

Synnergren's rapid ascent through the ranks continued, including graduation from the Royal Swedish Army Staff College and various military studies abroad. He held teaching positions and became a major while heading the Tactics Department. Notably, he became the Chief of the Army Staff in 1963 and ultimately achieved the rank of Supreme Commander of the Swedish Armed Forces in 1967. During his tenure as Supreme Commander, Synnergren oversaw significant defense policy changes, including the abandonment of neutrality and the development of the Saab 37 Viggen aircraft. He also led reorganization efforts and cutbacks in the Army and Navy.

Synnergren was widely associated with military intelligence, particularly during the exposure of the secret intelligence agency IB. Beyond his military career, Synnergren held various positions of trust in organizations such as the Swedish Tourist Association, Swedish Ski Association, and corporate boards. He also served on the board of the East Economic Office, a unique agency within Swedish military intelligence. Synnergren was famous for advancing from the rank of captain to becoming the "youngest general in the modern times" in just five years.

== Early life ==
Synnergren was born on 25 February 1915 in Överluleå Parish, Boden Municipality, Sweden, the son of Gösta Synnergren, an engine driver, and his wife Sara (née Carlstén). His father was also a Social Democratic city councilman in Boden and his mother was a Social Democratic member of the child welfare committee. Synnergren's school years were marked by sports, physical education and outdoor recreation. He passed studentexamen in Luleå in 1936 with the grades A in physics and a in mathematics and chemistry. He was then admitted to the Royal Institute of Technology in Stockholm. He had at this time no thought of becoming an officer.

The turning point of his life happened during a fall day in 1936 during the Berlin Olympics in which Synnergren participated as a member of the Swedish gymnastics squad. The experience of Adolf Hitler, surrounded by the Third Reich throughout threatening paramilitary splendor changed Synnergren's choice of career. Like so many of his peers, he had a strong feeling that a new world war was imminent. He withdrew his application to the Royal Institute of Technology and decided to become an officer. In 1939, as World War II broke out, he finished first in his class at the Swedish Infantry Officer Candidate School at the Royal Military Academy.

== Career ==
=== Military career ===
Synnergren was commissioned as an officer with the rank of second lieutenant in 1939 and served in the Ski Battalion (I 19 K) in Kiruna during World War II and guarded the Norwegian border when Germany occupied Narvik. After the German attack on Norway on 9 April 1940, he as an intelligence officer in the regimental staff, on several occasions, alone and on skis, got into the war zone in Northern Norway to make contact with the Norwegian forces and gather intelligence within the German dominated area. Because of his fell experience and skills, he became, after a brief interlude as a cadet officer at Karlberg in 1944, the head of evacuation in Jokkmokk and was as such responsible for management of the Norwegian refugees. After the war, he was appointed captain in 1946 and did in a short time a rapid military career.

Synnergren graduated from the Royal Swedish Army Staff College in 1948 and became a cadet of the General Staff and then captain of the General Staff. He conducted studies in the Norwegian Army in 1950 and 1953, the British Army in 1951 and 1953 and the United States Army in 1951 and 1959. He was a teacher at the Royal Swedish Army Staff College from 1953 to 1956 and again from 1957 to 1958. Synnergren was promoted to major in 1957 and was head of the Tactics Department at the Army Staff from 1958 to 1960. He studied at the Swedish National Defence College in 1960 and was promoted to lieutenant colonel in the Svea Life Guards (I 1) in 1961.

Between 1962-63 he was commanding officer of Västernorrland Regiment (I 21). In 1963 he was promoted to major general and appointed Chief of the Army Staff and of the General Staff Corps. Between 1966-67 he was the military commander of Bergslagen Military District (Milo B). In 1967 he was promoted to lieutenant general and appointed Chief of the Defence Staff and was three years later promoted to general and appointed Supreme Commander of the Swedish Armed Forces. During Synnergren's time as the Supreme Commander, a series of long-term decisions were made that meant big changes for the defense. The policy of neutrality was concluded and thus the idea of a strong defense of universal conscription. It was decided that the aircraft Viggen would be developed while reorganizing and cut-backs were made in the Army and Navy.

Synnergren was in the media most closely associated with military intelligence as the secret intelligence agency IB was exposed during his time as Supreme Commander. In December 1975, his appointment was extended for two years from October 1976.

=== Other work ===
Synnergren had during and after his military career a series of positions of trust. He was chief of His Majesty's Military Staff from 1978 to 1986, chairman of the Swedish Tourist Association from 1976 to 1987 and chairman of the Swedish Ski Association from 1973 to 1975. He was also chairman of Stora AB from 1980 to 1986, Bergvik och Ala AB from 1981 and board member of Saab-Scania from 1981 to 1990, LKAB from 1982 to 1986, Saab Combitech from 1982 to 1990 and the International Ski Federation from 1976 to 1988. Synnergren was also a board member of the East Economic Bureau, an agency which occupied a special position among the agencies engaged in the Swedish military intelligence.

== Personal life ==
In 1941, Synnergren married junior school teacher Margit Lindgren (1916–2016), the daughter of the first office clerk at SJ, Anton Lindgren and his wife Anna Richardsson. He was the father of Britta (born 1942), Kristina (born 1946) and Elisabeth (born 1947).

== Death ==
Synnergren died on 28 April 2004 in Hedvig Eleonora Parish, Stockholm. Synnergren spent the last time of his life in Saltsjöbaden Hospital. The funeral service took place on 26 May 2004 in Gustaf Adolf Church in Stockholm. He was interred at Galärvarvskyrkogården in Stockholm.

== Dates of rank ==
- 13 April 1939 – Second lieutenant
- 4 April 1941 – Lieutenant
- 1 April 1947 – Captain
- 1 April 1957 – Major
- 1 October 1961 – Lieutenant colonel
- 1 August 1962 – Colonel
- 1 October 1963 – Major general
- 1 April 1967 – Lieutenant general
- 1 October 1970 – General

== Awards and decorations ==
- (Sweden) H. M. The King's Medal, 12th size gold medal worn around the neck on a chain of gold (1978)
- (Sweden) Commander Grand Cross of the Order of the Sword (6 June 1970)
- (Sweden) Commander 1st Class of the Order of the Sword (11 November 1966)
- (Sweden) Knight of the Order of the Sword (before 1963)
- (Sweden) Swedish Ski Association's Sixtus Medal (1988)

=== Foreign ===
- (Spain) Knight Grand Cross of the Order of Isabella the Catholic (15 October 1979)
- (Iceland) Grand Cross of the Order of the Falcon (26 October 1981)
- (Norway) Grand Cross of the Order of St. Olav (19 March 1973)
- (Denmark) Grand Cross of the Order of the Dannebrog (26 August 1977)
- (Portugal) Grand Cross of the Military Order of Aviz (13 January 1987)

== Honours ==
- Member of the Royal Swedish Academy of War Sciences (1956)
- Honorary member of the Royal Swedish Society of Naval Sciences (1970)
- Member of the Royal Swedish Academy of Engineering Sciences (1977)

Military offices
Preceded by Arne Mohlin	Chief of the Army Staff; General Staff Corps; 1 October 1963 – 30 March 1966	Succeeded by Ove Ljung
Preceded by Regner Leuhusen	Bergslagen Military District; 1 April 1966 – 31 March 1967	Succeeded by Stig Löfgren
Preceded by Carl Eric Almgren	Chief of the Defence Staff; 1 April 1967 – 30 September 1970	Succeeded by Bo Westin
Preceded by Torsten Rapp	Supreme Commander; 1 October 1970 – 30 September 1978	Succeeded by Lennart Ljung
Court offices
Preceded by Malcolm Murray	Chief of His Majesty's Military Staff; 1 October 1978 – 1986	Succeeded by Lennart Ljung
