= Lennart Rönnberg =

Swedish military personnel (1938–2022)

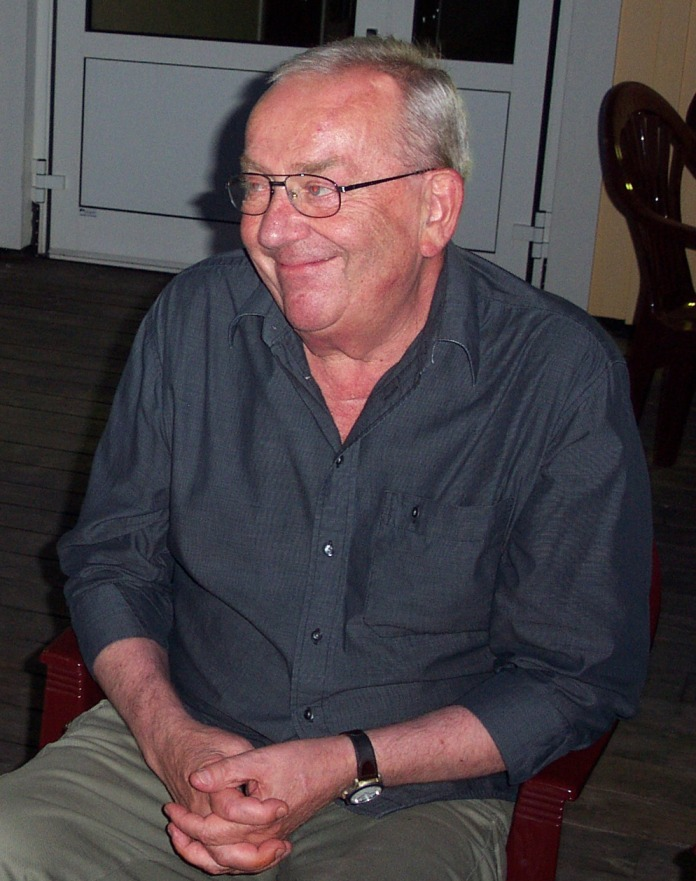
- Rönnberg in 2004.
- Born: Erik Lennart Rönnberg; 21 November 1938; Fjällsjö, Strömsund Municipality, Sweden
- Died: 25 December 2022 (aged 84); Sundbyberg, Sweden
- Military career
- Allegiance: Sweden
- Branch: Swedish Army
- Service years: 1961–1999
- Rank: Major general
- Commands: Västernorrland Regiment; Chief of the Army Staff; General Staff Corps; Chief of Staff, Milo M; NNSC

Major General Erik Lennart Rönnberg (21 November 1938 – 25 December 2022) was a Swedish Army officer. His senior commands include postings as Chief of the Army Staff and of the General Staff Corps (1990–1994) and Chief of Staff of the Middle Military District (1994–1995).

== Early life ==
Rönnberg was born on 21 November 1938 in Fjällsjö Parish, Strömsund Municipality, Sweden, the son of Albin Rönnberg and his wife Hilda (née Viklund). Rönnberg became an officer candidate in Västernorrland Regiment on 28 August 1960 and he graduated from Military Academy Karlberg in 1961.

== Career ==
Rönnberg was commissioned as an officer with then rank second lieutenant and assigned to Västernorrland Regiment on 1 September 1961. He participated in UN operations in the Gaza Strip with the United Nations Emergency Force (UNEF) in 1962 and in Cyprus with the United Nations Peacekeeping Force in Cyprus (UNFICYP) in 1964. Rönnberg was promoted to lieutenant on 1 September 1963 and to captain on 1 September 1969. Rönnberg attended the Swedish Armed Forces Staff College in 1971 and he was promoted to major on 1 October 1972. He served as an office head in the Education Department in the Army Staff from 1973 to 1976.

Rönnberg attended the British Army Staff College in 1976 and was promoted to lieutenant colonel on 1 October 1977. He served as head of department in the staff of the Southern Military District from 1976 to 1978 and as head of the Planning Department in the Army Staff from 1978 to 1981. Rönnberg attended the Swedish National Defence College in 1981 and served as battalion commander in Västernorrland Regiment from 1981 to 1983. He was promoted to colonel and appointed regimental commander of Västernorrland Regiment on 1 October 1982. On 1 April 1987, Rönnberg was promoted to senior colonel and was appointed military district inspector and head of the Education and Personnel Section in the staff of the Lower Norrland Military District. On 1 April 1990, Rönnberg was promoted to major general and assumed the position of the last Chief of the Army Staff and of the General Staff Corps. On 1 July 1994, Rönnberg assumed the position of Chief of Staff of the Middle Military District.

Rönnberg then served as head of the Swedish Delegation to the Neutral Nations Supervisory Commission (NNSC) from 1 January 1997 to February 1998. Rönnberg was at the disposal of the Chief of Army Command from 1998. Rönnberg retired in 1999.

== Personal life ==
Rönnberg was married between 1967 and 1990 to Iréne Hellman (born 1946), the daughter of P.K. Hellman and Lotten (née Valberg).

== Death ==
Rönnberg died on 25 December 2022 in Sundbyberg Parish in Sundbyberg Municipality, Sweden. The funeral service was held on 19 January 2023 in Sundbyberg Church.

== Awards and decorations ==
- United Nations Emergency Force Medal (UNEF)
- United Nations Medal (UNFICYP)

== Dates of rank ==
- 1961 – Second lieutenant
- 1963 – Lieutenant
- 1969 – Captain
- 1972 – Major
- 1977 – Lieutenant colonel
- 1982 – Colonel
- 1987 – Senior colonel
- 1990 – Major general

== Bibliography ==
- Rönnberg, Lennart, ed. (1998). Generalstabskår och generalstabsofficerare 1973-1998 (in Swedish). Stockholm: Probus. ISBN 9187184559. SELIBR 7762938.
- Rönnberg, Lennart, ed. (1995). Arméns ledning från vasatid till nutid (in Swedish). Stockholm: Probus. ISBN 9187184427. SELIBR 7762926.
- Rönnberg, Lennart; Borgén, Jan-Olof (1980). Försvar i framtid. Försvar i nutid, 0046-4643; 1980:3 (in Swedish). Stockholm: Centralförb. Folk och försvar. SELIBR 206102.

== Honours ==
- Member of the Royal Swedish Academy of War Sciences (1982)

Military offices
Preceded by Åke Sagrén	Västernorrland Regiment; 1983–1987	Succeeded by Göte Bergerbrant
Preceded by Krister Larsson	Chief of the Army Staff General Staff Corps; 1990–1994	Succeeded by None
Preceded by Svante Bergh	Chief of Staff of the Middle Military District; 1994–1995	Succeeded by Anders Lindström
Preceded by Mats Marling	Heads of Swedish Delegation to the NNSC; 1 January 1997 – February 1998	Succeeded by Sven Julin
