= Lennart Ljung (general) =

Swedish general and supreme commander (1921–1990)

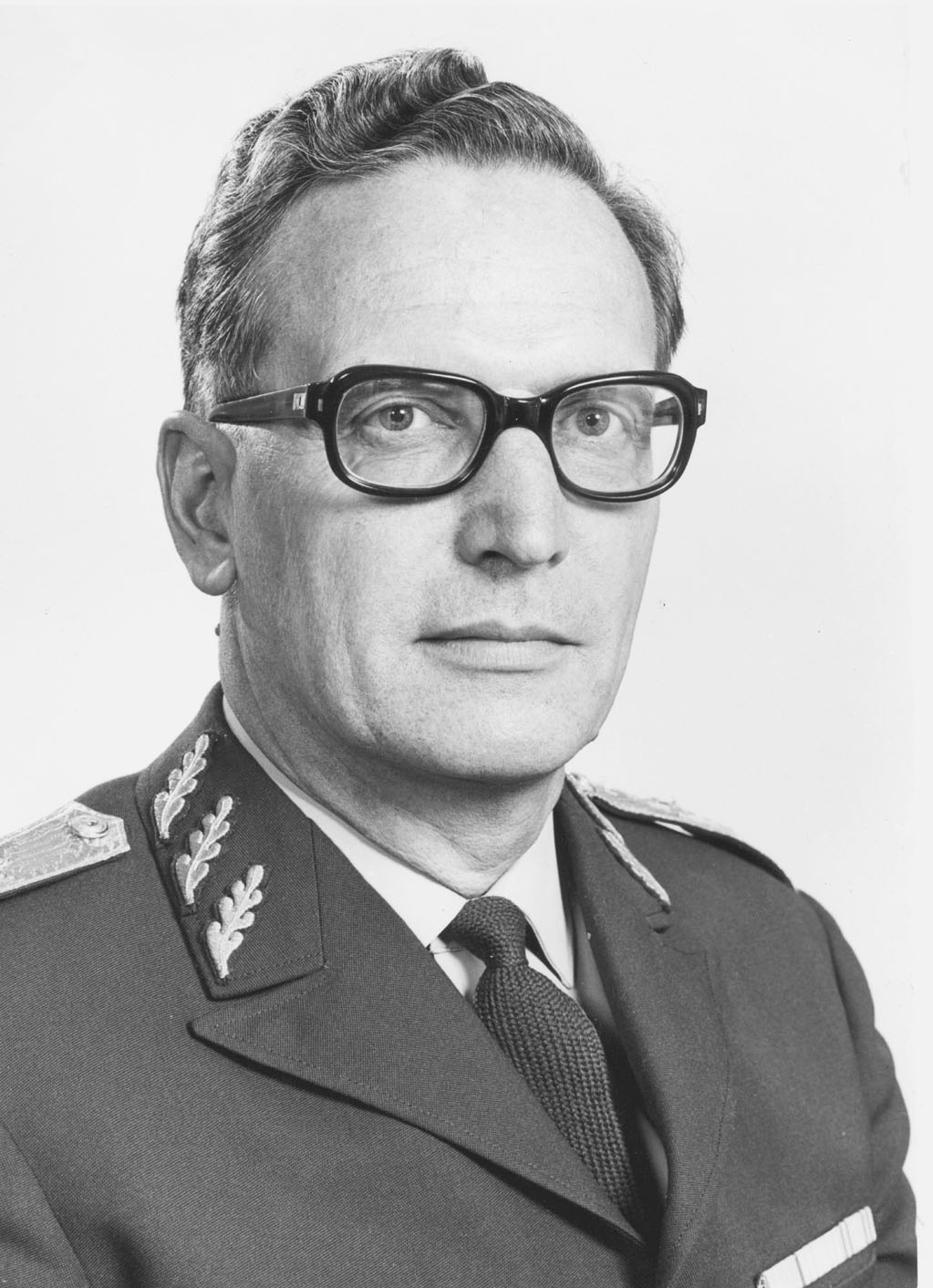
- Ljung as major general.
- Born: Karl Hilmer Lennart Ljung; 13 March 1921; Sollefteå, Sweden
- Died: 19 November 1990 (aged 69); Stockholm, Sweden
- Military career
- Allegiance: Sweden
- Branch: Swedish Army
- Service years: 1944–1986
- Rank: General
- Commands: Chief of the Army Staff; General Staff Corps; Chief of the Defence Staff; Supreme Commander
- Conflicts: Soviet submarine U 137
- Awards: Order of the Sword
- Other work: Chief of His Majesty's Military Staff

General Karl Hilmer Lennart Ljung (13 March 1921 – 19 November 1990) was a Swedish Army officer who served as Supreme Commander of the Swedish Armed Forces from 1978 to 1986. During Ljung's eight years as Supreme Commander many events of importance for Swedish security and defense policy occurred. Sweden had five different governments under four prime ministers from different political sides. Prime Minister Olof Palme was assassinated, the submarine incidents culminated with the Soviet submarine U 137 running aground in Karlskrona and the decision of developing a new fighter aircraft came through.

== Early life ==
Ljung was born on 13 March 1921 in Sollefteå, Sweden, the son of captain Hilmer Ljung and his wife Greta (née Gustafsson). He passed his studentexamen in Gävle in 1941.

== Career ==
Ljung was commissioned as an officer 1944 and was assigned as a second lieutenant to the Swedish Army Signal Troops the same year. He attended the Royal School of Signals in 1950 and the Royal Swedish Army Staff College from 1952 to 1954. Ljung was promoted to captain in the Swedish Army Signal Troops in 1953 and attended the United States Army Command and General Staff College at Fort Leavenworth, Kansas from 1956 to 1957 when he became captain of the General Staff.

Ljung served in North Scanian Infantry Regiment (I 6) from 1960 to 1961 when he became major of the General Staff. Ljung was teacher of strategy at the Royal Swedish Armed Forces Staff College from 1962 to 1963 and attended the Swedish National Defence College in 1963. He was promoted to lieutenant colonel in 1964 and served in Gotland Regiment (P 18) from 1965 to 1966. He was promoted to colonel in 1966 and was head of the Operation Command 2 of the Defence Staff in 1966. He was after that commanding officer of the Uppland Signal Regiment (S 1) from 1968 to 1971, section chief of the Military District Staff of the Eastern Military District (Milo Ö) from 1971 to 1972 and was promoted to major general in 1972. The same year he became Chief of the Army Staff and the General Staff Corps and acting military commander of the Western Military District (Milo V) in 1974. On 1 October 1976. Ljung was promoted to lieutenant general assumed the position of Chief of the Defence Staff.

In 1978 he was promoted to general and appointed Supreme Commander. Ljung's time as Supreme Commander was marked by major transformations in the Swedish Armed Forces and by the constant financial pressure. It also consisted of renewal of the war planning, major military equipment projects, such as the Saab JAS 39 Gripen, a new kind of armed forces training and reorganization of both the leadership and the command organization. The handling of the submarine incidents and the systematic continuing submarine incursions also caused great strain on him.

Ljung was Supreme Commander during the submarine incident in Karlskrona when the Soviet submarine U 137 in October 1981 ran aground in Blekinge archipelago. By then he had a close collaboration with Prime Minister Thorbjörn Fälldin and was very prominent throughout the incident. His report on the whole situation excluded the possibility that the submarine accidentally ended up in Swedish territory, and he pursue in the coming years the issue of higher allocations to the military to fight the submarine intrusions which was considered coming from the Soviet Union.

According to Robert Dalsjö's doctoral thesis, Ljung was the last Supreme Commander who knew the secret peacetime cooperation with NATO, and also the one who discontinued the cooperation. In 1986, Ljung left the position of Supreme Commander and retired from military service and became chief of His Majesty's Military Staff.

== Personal life ==
In 1947, Ljung married Gertrud Öhman (1922–2005), the daughter of furrier August Öhman and Anna (née Nilsson). They had two children, Lars (born 1948), a retired colonel and senior adviser of the Folke Bernadotte Academy and Ann-Marie (born 1953).

== Death ==
Lennart Ljung died on 19 November 1990 and was buried in Söderhamn cemetery.

== Dates of rank ==
Promotions
Rank	Date
Second lieutenant	1944
Lieutenant	1946
Captain	1957
Major	1961
Lieutenant colonel	1964
Colonel	1966
Major general	1972
Lieutenant general	1 October 1976
General	1 October 1978

== Awards and decorations ==
=== Swedish ===
- (Sweden) H. M. The King's Medal, 12th size gold medal worn around the neck on a chain of gold (1986)
- (Sweden) Commander 1st Class of the Order of the Sword (6 June 1973)
- (Sweden) Knight of the Order of the Sword (1962)

=== Foreign ===
- (Denmark) Grand Cross of the Order of the Dannebrog (7 April 1981)
- (Portugal) Grand Cross of the Order of Prince Henry (15 May 1991)
- (United States) Commander of the Legion of Merit (1980)

== Honours ==
- Member of the Royal Swedish Academy of War Sciences (1967)
- Honorary member of the Royal Swedish Society of Naval Sciences (1980)
- Member of the International Hall of Fame, United States Army Command and General Staff College

Military offices
Preceded by Karl Eric Holm	Chief of the Army Staff; General Staff Corps; 1972–1974	Succeeded by Gösta Hökmark
Preceded by Claës Skoglund	Commander (acting) of the Western Military District; 1974–1976	Succeeded by Nils Personne
Preceded by Gunnar Eklund	Chief of the Defence Staff; 1976–1978	Succeeded by Bengt Schuback
Preceded by Stig Synnergren	Supreme Commander; 1978–1986	Succeeded by Bengt Gustafsson
Court offices
Preceded by Stig Synnergren	Chief of His Majesty's Military Staff; 1986–1990	Succeeded by Bror Stefenson
