= Bert Carpelan =

Swedish Army officer (1895–1981)

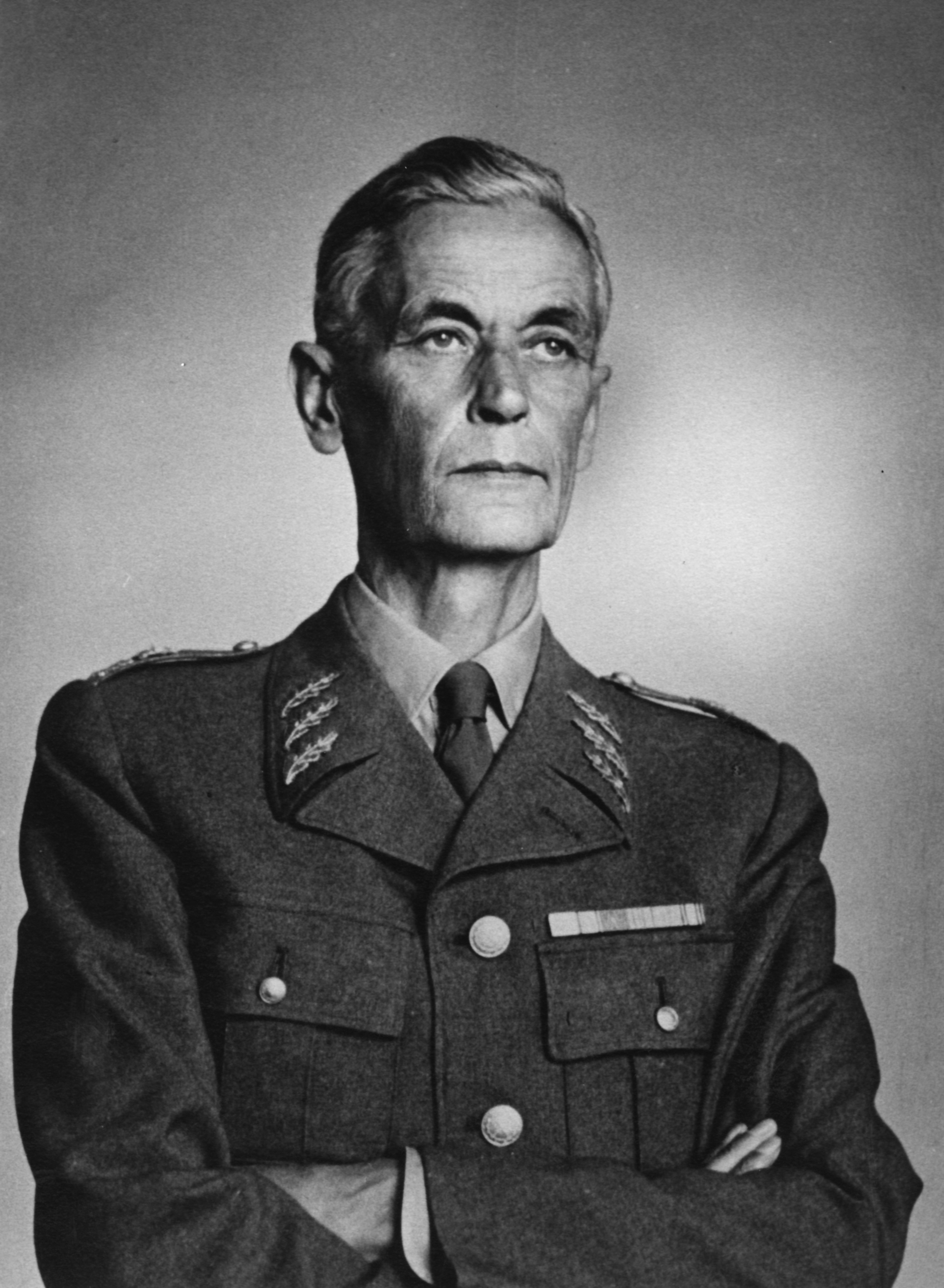
- Carpelan in 1961.
- Born: Ivar Bert Tyko Carpelan; 2 December 1895; Nås, Sweden
- Died: 16 November 1981 (aged 85); Täby, Sweden
- Military career
- Allegiance: Sweden
- Branch: Swedish Army (1918–20, 1930–61); Swedish Air Force (1925–1928)
- Service years: 1918–1961
- Rank: Lieutenant General
- Commands: Gotland Artillery Corps; Svea Artillery Regiment; Chief of the Army Staff; General Staff Corps; IV Military District; Commandant General in Stockholm

Lieutenant General Ivar Bert Tyko Carpelan (2 December 1895 – 16 November 1981) was a Swedish Army officer. Carpelan's senior commands include Chief of the Army Staff and the General Staff Corps, commanding officer of the IV Military District and Commandant General in Stockholm.

== Early life ==
Carpelan was born on 2 December 1895 in Nås, Kopparberg County, Sweden, the son of Axel Carpelan, a postmaster, and his wife Tekla (née Jäde). He passed studentexamen in Luleå in 1913.

== Career ==
Carpelan was commissioned into the Swedish Army as second lieutenant in Småland Artillery Regiment (A 6) in 1918. Carpelan became lieutenant two years later and attended the Royal Central Gymnastics Institute from 1920 to 1922. He became an aerial reconnaissance officer in 1925 and a sergeant pilot in 1927. In 1928 Carpelan was promoted to lieutenant in the Swedish Air Force. He then attended the Royal Swedish Army Staff College from 1929 to 1931. Carpelan served in Karlsborg Artillery Regiment (A 9) in 1930 and he was promoted to captain in 1932.

Carpelan served as a staff adjutant and captain of the General Staff in 1934 and in the Norrbotten Artillery Corps (A 5) in 1937. In 1938 he became major of the General Staff and served as chief of the general staff of the 1st Army Division from 1938 to 1941. Carpelan then served as lieutenant colonel in Wendes Artillery Regiment (A 3) in 1941 and as colonel and commanding officer of the Gotland Artillery Corps (A 7) from 1943 to 1945. He was colonel in the General Staff Corps in 1945 and served as Vice Chief of the Army Staff from 1945 to 1947 and then as commanding officer of Svea Artillery Regiment (A 1) from 1947 to 1951.

Carpelan was then chief of Section II of the Army Staff from 1951 to 1953 when he was promoted to major general and appointed Chief of the Army Staff and of the General Staff Corps. In 1957, he was appointed commanding officer of the IV Military District and the Commandant General in Stockholm. He was promoted to lieutenant general in 1961, the same year he retired from active service.

== Personal life ==
In 1927, Carpeland married Evy Högström (1899–1982), the daughter of August Högström and Gerda Andal.

== Dates of rank ==
- 1918 – Second lieutenant
- 1920 – Lieutenant (Swedish Army)
- 1928 – Lieutenant (Swedish Air Force)
- 1932 – Captain
- 1938 – Major
- 1941 – Lieutenant colonel
- 1943 – Colonel
- 1953 – Major general
- 1961 – Lieutenant general

== Awards and decorations ==
=== Swedish ===
- (Sweden) King Gustaf V's Jubilee Commemorative Medal (1948)
- (Sweden) Commander Grand Cross of the Order of the Sword (4 June 1960)
- (Sweden) Commander 1st Class of the Order of the Sword (6 December 1950)
- (Sweden) Commander of the Order of the Sword (15 November 1947)
- (Sweden) Commander of the Order of the Sword (1938)
- (Sweden) Knight of the Order of Vasa (1942)
- (Sweden) Home Guard Medal of Merit in Gold
- (Sweden) Swedish Central Federation for Voluntary Military Training Medal of Merit in silver
- (Sweden) Equestrian Olympic Medal of Merit (Ryttarolympisk förtjänstmedalj)

=== Foreign ===
- (Norway) Grand Cross of the Order of St. Olav (1 July 1959)
- (Pahlavi dynasty) Grand Cross of the Order of Homayoun
- (Netherlands) Grand Officer of the Order of Orange-Nassau with swords (18 May 1957)
- (Denmark) King Christian X's Liberty Medal

== Honours ==
- Member of the Royal Swedish Academy of War Sciences (1946; its president from 1963 to 1965)

Military offices
Preceded by Viking Tamm	Chief of the Army Staff; General Staff Corps; 1953–1957	Succeeded by Gustav Åkerman
Preceded by Gustaf Dyrssen	IV Military District; 1957–1961	Succeeded by Gustav Åkerman
Preceded by Gustaf Dyrssen	Commandant General in Stockholm; 1957–1961	Succeeded by Gustav Åkerman
Professional and academic associations
Preceded by Rudolf Kolmodin	President of the Royal Swedish Academy of War Sciences; 1963–1965	Succeeded by Lage Thunberg
