= Viking Tamm =

Swedish general

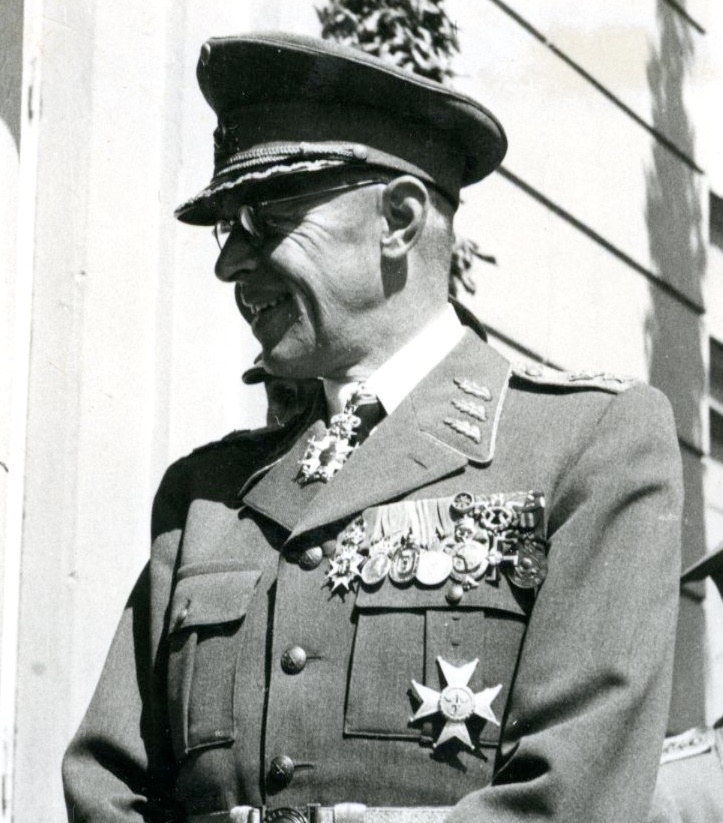
- Major General Viking Tamm in June 1948.
- Born: Viking Sebastian Henricsson Tamm; 21 July 1896; Stockholm, Sweden
- Died: 25 November 1975 (aged 79); Vä, Sweden
- Burial place: Film Cemetery, Östhammar Municipality
- Military career
- Allegiance: Sweden
- Branch: Swedish Army
- Service years: 1916–34 (Sweden); 1934–36 (Ethiopian Empire); 1936–39 (Sweden); 1940 (Finland); 1940–46 (Sweden); 1945–46 (Ethiopian Empire); 1946–61 (Sweden)
- Rank: Lieutenant General
- Commands: South Scanian Infantry Regiment; Chief of the Army Staff; General Staff Corps; I Military District
- Conflicts: Second Italo-Ethiopian War; Winter War

Lieutenant General Viking Sebastian Henricsson Tamm (21 July 1896 – 25 November 1975) was a Swedish Army officer. In addition to the years he served in the Swedish Army, Tamm led a group of Swedish officers who developed the Ethiopian military school's officer training (1934–36 and 1945–46) and he was a volunteer in the Winter War in Finland in 1940 commanding the II. Battlegroup of the Swedish Volunteer Corps. Back in Sweden he eventually became Chief of the Army Staff and the General Staff Corps (1948–53) and commander of the I Military District (1953–61) before retiring as a Lieutenant General in 1961.

== Early life ==
Tamm was born on 21 July 1896 in Stockholm, Sweden, the son of the bank director and later finance minister Henric Tamm and his wife Louise Tham.

== Career ==
Tamm was commissioned as an officer with the rank of second lieutenant in 1916 and was assigned to Svea Life Guards (I 1). He was promoted to lieutenant in 1919. Tamm attended the Royal Swedish Army Staff College from 1925 to 1927 and became captain of the General Staff in 1930 and at the Svea Life Guards (I 1) in 1934. He entered the Ethiopian Empire's service in 1934. Captain Tamm and the then Chief of Air Force, Major General Eric Virgin, who was employed as the emperor's military political adviser, as well as four other military officers (the lieutenants Nils Bouveng, Arne Thorburn, Gustaf Heüman and Anders Nyblom) entered together into the Ethiopian service to organize the country's only military school for the training of Ethiopian officers. A Swedish military academy for cadets was established in Holeta Genet under captain Tamm who, with his staff, stayed on in Ethiopia after the outbreak of the Second Italo-Ethiopian War despite pressure by the Swedish government to return.

Tamm re-entered into the Swedish Army as captain of the General Staff in 1936 and was a teacher of tactics at the Royal Swedish Army Staff College in 1936. Tamm became major in the General Staff Corps in 1937 and was promoted to Lieutenant Colonel in 1939. During World War II, he was a member of the Finlandskommittén and in 1940 he entered into Finnish service and became commander of the II. Battlegroup of the Swedish Volunteer Corps during the Winter War.

He was a lieutenant colonel of the General Staff Corps and head of department at the Army Staff's Education Department in 1940. Tamm was colonel in the General Staff Corps in 1941 and head of the Royal Swedish Army Staff College in 1941 and commander of the South Scanian Infantry Regiment (I 7) from 1942 to 1944. Furthermore Tamm was Inspector of the Infantry from 1944 to 1946 and was back again in Ethiopian service from 1945 to 1946. He was deputy military commander of the I Military District in 1946 and was promoted to major general and was Chief of the Army Staff and the General Staff Corps from 1948 to 1953. Tamm was military commander of the I. Military District from 1953 to 1961 and was inspector of Kristianstad Higher General Secondary School from 1953 to 1958. He was promoted to lieutenant general in 1961.

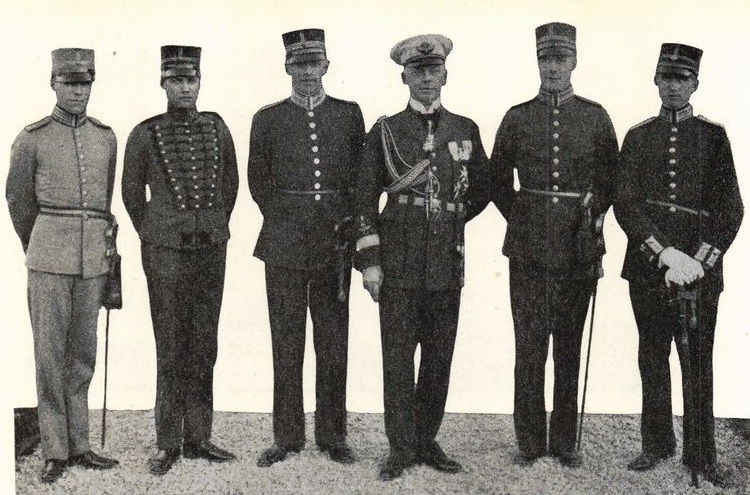
Tamm (third from the left) along with four other Swedish officers in Abyssinia in 1934.

== Personal life ==
Tamm married for the first time in 1919 with Katarina Lagercrantz (born 1900), the daughter of the envoy Herman Lagercrantz and Hedvig (née Croneborg). He married a second time in 1938 with Suzanne Kartavtzeff (born 1909), the daughter of the captain Wsevolod Kartavtzeff and Marta von Haartman. Tamm was the father of Annika (born 1920), Per-Henric (born 1922), Hedvig (born 1926) and Kristina (born 1930).

== Death ==
Tamm died in 1975 and was buried at Film Cemetery in Östhammar Municipality.

== Dates of rank ==
- 1916 – Second lieutenant
- 1919 – Lieutenant
- 1930 – Captain
- 1937 – Major
- 1939 – Lieutenant colonel
- 1941 – Colonel
- 1948 – Major general
- 1961 – Lieutenant general

== Awards and decorations ==
Tamm's awards:

=== Swedish ===
- (Sweden) Commander Grand Cross of the Order of the Sword (6 June 1965)
- (Sweden) Commander 1st Class of the Order of Vasa
- (Sweden) Landstorm Silver Medal (Landstorm-silvermedalj)
- (Sweden) Army Shooting Medal (Arméns skyttemedalj)

=== Foreign ===
- (Ethiopian Empire) Knight Grand Cross of the Order of Menelik II
- Commander Grand Cross of the Order of the Lion of Finland
- (Ethiopian Empire) Grand Officer of the Order of the Star of Ethiopia
- (France) Commander of the Legion of Honour
- (France) Commander of the French Ordre du Mérite sportif
- (Spain) Knight 1st Class of the Crosses of Military Merit (with White Decoration)
- (Ethiopian Empire) Officer of the Order of the Holy Trinity
- (Finland) 3rd Class of the Order of the Cross of Liberty with swords
- (Finland) Finnish War Memorial Medal

== Honours ==
- Member of the Royal Swedish Academy of War Sciences (1939)

== Bibliography ==
- Tamm, Viking (1942). Värnpliktsutbildningen vid armén [Conscript training in the Army]. Medborgarkunskap om riksförsvaret, 99-1771683-1; 7 (in Swedish). Stockholm: Riksförb. för Sveriges försvar.
- Tamm, Viking (1936). I tjänst hos Negus: aderton månader som krigsskolechef i Etiopien [In the service of Negus: eighteen months as war school director in Ethiopia] (in Swedish) (2nd ed.). Stockholm: Wahlström & Widstrand.

Military offices
| Preceded by Ivar Backlund | Chief of the Army Staff; General Staff Corps; 1948–1953 | Succeeded by Bert Carpelan |
| Preceded by Samuel Åkerhielm | I Military District; 1953–1961 | Succeeded by Curt Göransson |
