= Chief of the Army Staff (Sweden) =

Military rank

- Chefen för arméstaben
- Incumbent; Colonel Dan Rasmussen since 1 April 2026
- Ministry of Defence
- Type: Chief of the Army Staff
- Abbreviation: CAst
- Reports to: Chief of Army
- Seat: Östermalmsgatan 87, Stockholm (1937–1981); Lidingövägen 24, Stockholm (1981–1994); Enköping (2019–)
- Term length: No fixed term
- Formation: 1937, 2019
- First holder: Colonel Helge Jung (1937); Colonel Dag Lidén (2019)
- Final holder: Major General Lennart Rönnberg
- Abolished: 1994
- Unofficial names: Arméstabschef
- Deputy: Vice Chief of the Army Staff

The Chief of the Army Staff (Swedish: Chefen för arméstaben, CAst, or Arméstabschef) is the professional head of the Swedish Army Staff. The post was created in 1936 with colonel Helge Jung as the first incumbent. The post disappeared in 1994 and was reintroduced in 2019 when the new Army Staff was established.

== History ==
The Chief of the Army Staff was from 1937 to 1994 the second most senior member of the Swedish Army after the Chief of the Army and headed the Army Staff. The position was initially held by a colonel (1937–1943) and later by a major general (1943–1994). The Chief of the Army Staff was also Chief of the General Staff Corps. When the Army Staff was disbanded in 1994, the office was eliminated. In 2019, the Army Staff was re-established and a Chief of the Army Staff was appointed again, this time held by a colonel.

== Chiefs of the Army Staff ==
=== Chiefs of the Army Staff (1937–1994) ===
No.	Portrait	Chief of the Army Staff	Took office	Left office	Time in office	Chief of the Army	Ref.
-	Ernst af Klercker	Major General (Note: af Klercker was colonel when taking office on 1 August 1936 and was promoted to major general on 19 March 1937 while still in office.); Ernst af Klercker (1881–1955); Acting	1 August 1936	30 June 1937	333 days	Lieutenant General; Oscar Nygren	
1	Helge Jung	Major General (Note: Jung was colonel when taking office on 1 July 1937 and was promoted to major general in 1938 while still in office.); Helge Jung (1886–1978)	1 July 1937	30 September 1940	3 years, 91 days	Lieutenant General; Per Sylvan	-
2	Folke Högberg	Major General; Folke Högberg (1884–1972)	1 October 1940	30 September 1942	1 year, 364 days	Lieutenant General; Ivar Holmquist	
3	Henry Tottie	Colonel; Henry Tottie (1888–1952)	1942	1943	0–1 years	Lieutenant General; Ivar Holmquist	-
4	Hugo Gadd	Major General; Hugo Gadd (1885–1968)	1943	1946	2–3 years	Lieutenant General; Ivar Holmquist; Lieutenant General; Archibald Douglas	-
5	Ivar Backlund	Major General; Ivar Backlund (1892–1969)	1946	1948	2–3 years	Lieutenant General; Archibald Douglas	-
6	Viking Tamm	Major General; Viking Tamm (1896–1975)	1948	1953	4–5 years	Lieutenant General; Carl August Ehrensvärd	-
7	Bert Carpelan	Major General; Bert Carpelan (1895–1981)	1953	1957	3–4 years	Lieutenant General; Carl August Ehrensvärd	-
8	Gustav Åkerman	Major General; Gustav Åkerman (1901–1988)	1957	1961	3–4 years	Lieutenant General; Thord Bonde	-
9	Arne Mohlin	Major General; Arne Mohlin (1909–1992)	1961	1963	1–2 years	Lieutenant General; Thord Bonde	-
10	Stig Synnergren	Major General; Stig Synnergren (1915–2004)	1963	1966	2–3 years	Lieutenant General; Curt Göransson	-
11	Ove Ljung	Major General; Ove Ljung (1918–1997)	1966	1968	1–2 years	Lieutenant General; Curt Göransson	-
-	Karl Eric Holm	Major General; Karl Eric Holm (1919–2016); Acting	1966	1968	1–2 years	Lieutenant General; Curt Göransson	-
12	Karl Eric Holm	Major General; Karl Eric Holm (1919–2016)	1968	1972	3–4 years	Lieutenant General; Curt Göransson; Lieutenant General; Carl Eric Almgren	-
13	Lennart Ljung	Major General; Lennart Ljung (1921–1990)	1972	1974	1–2 years	Lieutenant General; Carl Eric Almgren	-
-	Gösta Hökmark	Major General; Gösta Hökmark (1920–1993); Acting	1973	1976	2–3 years	Lieutenant General; Carl Eric Almgren	
14	Gösta Hökmark	Major General; Gösta Hökmark (1920–1993)	1976	31 March 1979	2–3 years	Lieutenant General; Nils Sköld	
15	Robert Lugn	Major General; Robert Lugn (1923–2016)	1 April 1979	1983	3–4 years	Lieutenant General; Nils Sköld	
16	Krister Larsson	Major General; Krister Larsson (1934–2022)	1983	1988	4–5 years	Lieutenant General; Nils Sköld; Lieutenant General; Erik G. Bengtsson	-
17	Curt Sjöö	Major General; Curt Sjöö (born 1937)	1988	1990	1–2 years	Lieutenant General; Erik G. Bengtsson	-
18	Lennart Rönnberg	Major General; Lennart Rönnberg (1938–2022)	1990	1994	3–4 years	Lieutenant General; Åke Sagrén	-

=== Chiefs of the Army Staff (2019–present) ===
No.	Portrait	Chief of the Army Staff	Took office	Left office	Time in office	Chief of Army	Ref.
1	Dag Lidén [sv]	Colonel; Dag Lidén (born 1961)	1 January 2019	31 May 2022	3 years, 150 days	Major General; Karl Engelbrektson	(Note: In the middle of 2021, Lidén's position as Chief of Army Staff was extended until further notice, however, until 30 June 2022 at the latest.)
2	Stefan Jansson	Colonel; Stefan Jansson (born 1967)	1 June 2022	Incumbent	3 years, 303 days	Major General; Karl Engelbrektson; Major General; Jonny Lindfors	
3	Dan Rasmussen	Colonel; Dan Rasmussen (born ?)	1 April 2026	Incumbent	159 days	Major General; Jonny Lindfors	

== Vice Chiefs of the Army Staff ==
Swedish: Souschef

No.	Portrait	Vice/Deputy Chief of the Army Staff	Took office	Left office	Time in office	Chief of Staff	Ref.
1	Gunnar Möller [sv]	Colonel; Gunnar Möller (1897–1953)	1942	1944	1–2 years	Colonel; Henry Tottie; Major General; Hugo Gadd	
2	Rolf Lindquist [sv]	Colonel; Rolf Lindquist (1895–1944)	1 April 1944	24 November 1944 (Note: Perished aboard SS Hansa on his way to Gotland.)	237 days	Major General; Hugo Gadd	
3	Bert Carpelan	Colonel; Bert Carpelan (1895–1981)	1 February 1945	1947	1–2 years	Major General; Hugo Gadd; Major General; Ivar Backlund	
4	Adolf Norberg [sv]	Colonel; Adolf Norberg (1900–1988)	1947	1948	0–1 years	Major General; Ivar Backlund	-
5	Miles Flach [sv]	Colonel; Miles Flach (1902–1974)	1949	1950	0–1 years	Major General; Viking Tamm	
