= Krister Larsson Lagersvärd =

Swedish Army officer (1934–2022)

- Born: Jan Krister Lennart Larsson; 14 September 1934; Lund, Sweden
- Died: 22 September 2022 (aged 88); Täby, Sweden
- Military career
- Allegiance: Sweden
- Branch: Swedish Army
- Service years: 1956–1994
- Rank: Major General
- Commands: Chief of the Army Staff; General Staff Corps; Swedish National Defence College

Major General Jan Krister Lennart Larsson Lagersvärd, né Larsson (14 September 1934 – 22 September 2022) was a senior Swedish Army officer. His senior commands include postings as Chief of the Army Staff and of the General Staff Corps (1983–1988) and head of the Swedish National Defence College from 1988 to 1994.

== Early life ==
Larsson was born on 14 September 1934 in Lund City Parish (Lunds stadsförsamling), Sweden, the son of Lennart Larsson, a farmer, and his wife Kristina (née Bengtsson).

== Career ==
Larsson attended a staff course at the Swedish Armed Forces Staff College from 1964 to 1966 and served in the Army Staff from 1966 to 1976. Larsson served in South Scanian Regiment from 1976 to 1977 and in the Southern Military District from 1977 to 1979 and then attended the Swedish National Defence College in 1979. He served as acting regimental commander of Värmland Regiment from 1979 to 1980 and Planning Director at the Defence Materiel Administration from 1980 to 1983.

In 1983, Larsson attended a staff course in Monterey, California, United States and at the Swedish National Defence College. In 1983, Larsson was also appointed Chief of the Army Staff and of the General Staff Corps. He served in this position for five years before being head of the Swedish National Defence College from 1988 to 1994.

Larsson was an expert in the Swedish Armed Forces Management Investigation (Försvarets ledningsutredning, FLU 74) and in the 1979 Materiel Procurement Commission (1979 års materielanskaffningskommission), chairman of the Swedish Pistol Shooting Association (Svenska pistolskytteförbundet) from 1984 to 1989, chairman of the Swedish Military Sports Association (Sveriges militära idrottsförbund) from 1984, and a board member of the Swedish Ancestry Research Association (Sveriges Släktforskarförbund).

He was chairman of the Swedish Military Sports Association from 1995 to 2000.

== Personal life ==
In 1962, he married Solveig Lagersvärd (née Bergström) (born 1934), the daughter of Arvid and Ingrid Bergström.

== Death ==
Larsson died on 22 September 2022 in Täby.

== Dates of rank ==
- 1956 – Second lieutenant
- 19?? – Lieutenant
- 1966 – Captain
- 1972 – Major
- 1972 – Lieutenant colonel
- 1979 – Colonel
- 1983 – Major general

== Awards and decorations ==
- (Sweden) Knight of the Order of the Sword (6 June 1974)

== Honours ==
- Member of the Royal Swedish Academy of War Sciences (1982)

Military offices
Preceded by Robert Lugn	Chief of the Army Staff General Staff Corps; 1983–1988	Succeeded by Curt Sjöö
Preceded by Bror Stefenson	Swedish National Defence College; 1988–1994	Succeeded by Nils Gyldén
