= Swedish Defence University =

Higher education establishment in Stockholm

- Försvarshögskolan
- Former name: Swedish National Defence College
- Type: Public Research University
- Established: 1997; 29 years ago (originally in 1952)
- Affiliations: ISMS; IAMP
- Vice-Chancellor: Robert Egnell (2019)
- Location: Stockholm, 115 93, Sweden; 59°20′56.5″N 18°4′9.5″E
- Campus: Urban
- Website: www.fhs.se/en/

The Swedish Defence University (Swedish: Försvarshögskolan, FHS) is situated on Drottning Kristinas väg 37 in Östermalm, Stockholm City Centre, next to the campus of the Royal Institute of Technology.

== History ==
Today's Swedish Defence University marks the latest development in a long line of military education tradition. The Higher Artillery College in Marieberg was established in Stockholm in the 19th century. The Swedish Defence University has existed in its present form since 1997. The university was established as a national university college on 1 January 2008, allowing it to issue academic degrees. Formerly known in English as the Swedish National Defence College, the university adopted its current name on 1 February 2015. In 2018 the Swedish Defence University received permission to grant two-year master's degrees and doctoral level.

== Education ==
The university trains and educates domestic and international military and civilian personnel, as well as civilian students. The university offers training for career and reserve officers of the Swedish Armed Forces. Graduates contribute, both nationally and internationally, to the management of crisis situations and security issues.

The university offers two bachelor level programmes in political science and military history, as well as six master's programmes of which four are international. Additionally, the officers' programme is a three-year undergraduate degree course through which the officers gain proficiency as platoon-level leaders.

Teachers and professors from the Swedish Defence University are often seen in the media as expert commentators on matters of public interest.

== Research ==
The university is a founding member of the International Society of Military Sciences (ISMS) and hosted the ISMS annual conference in 2010. The university contributes towards national and international security through research and development. Research is carried out Military Arts and Sciences and subsequently disseminated both nationally and internationally. The university is a member of the International Association for Military Pedagogy, whose members include military and civilian professionals from military institutions of advanced learning.

== Publications ==
At the Swedish Defence University, basic research and applied research are conducted with relevance to the area of community protection and security. The research covers both military and civilian aspects of the area and ranges from security policy and civilian crisis management to war, defence and military operations. Much of the published material can be found in DiVA, the Digital Scientific Archive, which is a publication database for research publications and student papers.

The Militärhistorisk tidskrift is the only one of its kind in the Nordic countries and is published by the Military History Section at the Swedish Defence College. Together with its predecessor Aktuellt och historiskt, it has been published since 1953. The Militärhistorisk tidskrift is usually published in December every year.

== Facilities and buildings ==
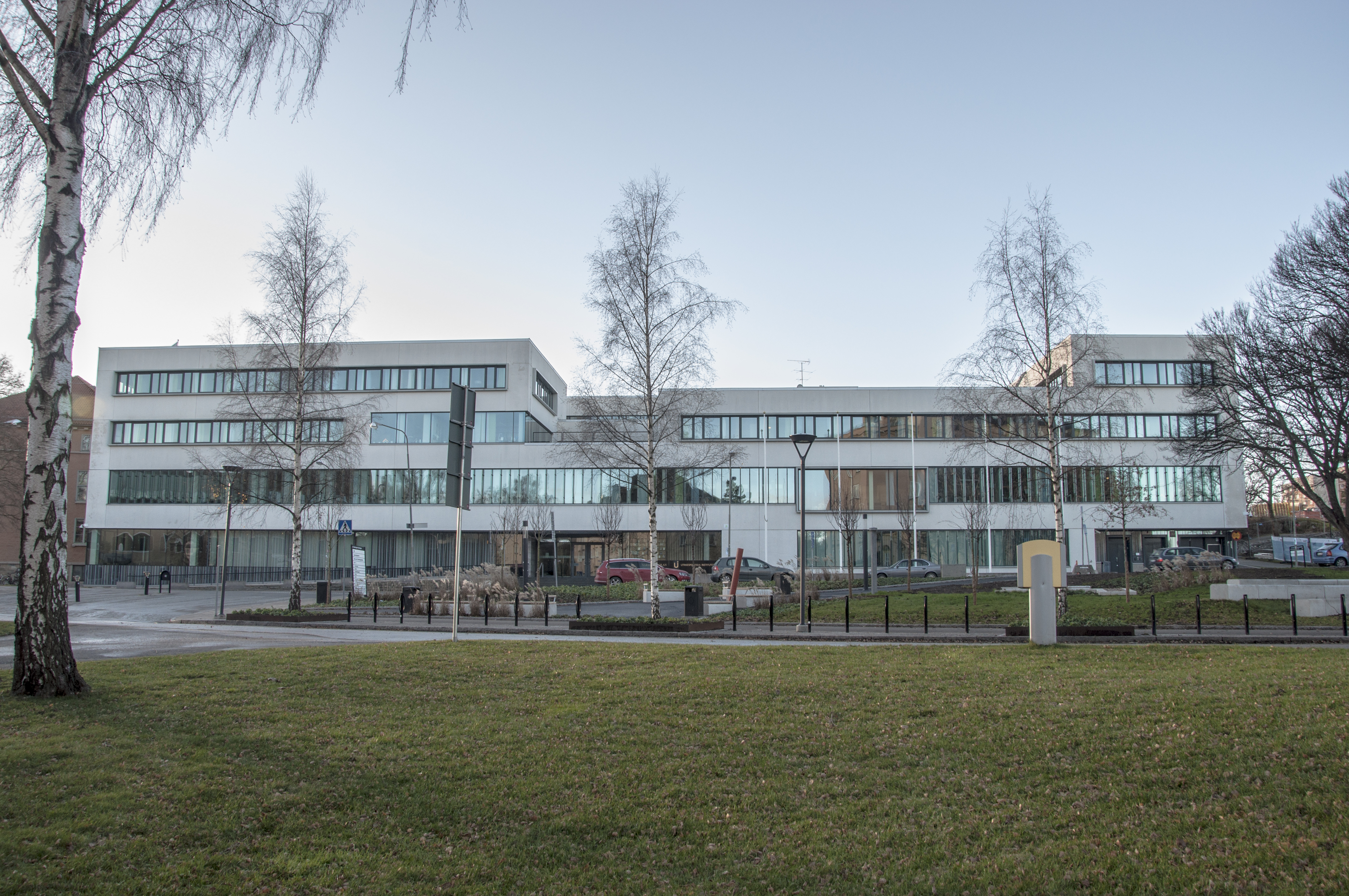
Main building of the Swedish Defence University

From 1926, the Royal Swedish Army Staff College, the Royal Swedish Naval Staff College and the Artillery and Engineering College were located on Östermalmsgatan 87 in Stockholm in the so-called Grå huset ("Gray House"). In connection with the formation of the Swedish Armed Forces Staff College on 1 October 1961, the new school was moved to the barracks area on Valhallavägen 117, which had been built in 1877 for the Svea Artillery Regiment (A 1). With the addition of the Swedish Armed Forces Management College (Försvarets förvaltningshögskola, FörvHS) in 1994, two new places of education were also added, where the Swedish Armed Forces Management College had its education in Karlstad and Östersund. After the Swedish Armed Forces Staff College was disbanded on 31 December 1996, the premises on Valhallavägen 117 were taken over by the new Swedish National Defence College.

After initially remaining with most of the activities on the premises at Valhallavägen, it was decided in the early 2000s that the Swedish National Defence College would move to newly erected premises on Campus Valhallavägen at Drottning Kristinas väg, neighbor of the KTH Royal Institute of Technology. From 1 August 2005, the college operated on Drottning Kristinas väg 37. New premises were inaugurated on 22 September 2005 by Carl XVI Gustaf. In 2007, the Swedish National Defence College left Östersund and since 2007 it is located on Drottning Kristinas väg 37 in Stockholm, at Karlberg Palace, Byggnad Nydal in Solna and in Karolinen on Våxnäsgatan 10 in Karlstad.

== Heraldry and traditions ==
=== Coat of arms ===
The coat of arms of the Swedish National Defence College from 1956 to 1985, and from 1994. Blazon: "Azure an erect sword surmounting an open chaplet of oak, or."

=== Traditions ===
The Swedish Defence College trace its lineage back to 1818 when the Higher Artillery School (Högre artilleriläroverket) in Marieberg was formed. Because the former Swedish Armed Forces Staff College was formed in 1961 by the service staff colleges, the Swedish Defence College thus has an unbroken lineage from the Higher Artillery School, the Royal Swedish Army Staff College, the Royal Swedish Naval Staff College, the Royal Swedish Air Force Staff College, the Swedish National Defence College, the Swedish Armed Forces Management College (Försvarets förvaltningshögskola, FörvHS), and the Swedish Armed Forces Staff College, and considers it their mission to look after this heritage. The original Marieberg clock, which stood in the yard at the Higher Artillery School in Marieberg in the 19th century, can today be found on the premises of the Swedish National Defence College on Drottning Kristinas väg.

== Heads ==
=== Vice-Chancellors ===
- 1952–1953: Major General Richard Åkerman
- 1953–1955: Major General Thord Bonde
- 1955–1956: Major General Ivar Backlund
- 1957–1960: Major General Gustaf Adolf Westring
- 1960–1964: Major General Sam Myhrman
- 1964–1966: Rear Admiral Oscar Krokstedt
- 1966–1968: Major General Malcolm Murray
- 1968–1972: Major General Claës Skoglund
- 1972–1978: Lieutenant General Bo Westin
- 1978–1984: Major General Bengt Liljestrand
- 1984–1987: Major General Gustaf Welin
- 1986–1987: Major General Kjell Nordström (acting)
- 1987–1988: Vice Admiral Bror Stefenson
- 1988–1994: Major General Krister Larsson
- 1994–1996: Nils Gyldén
- 1997–1998: Rear Admiral Claes Tornberg
- 1998–2002: Major General Karlis Neretnieks
- 2002–2008: Lieutenant Colonel Henrik Landerholm
- 2008–2010: Mats Ericson
- 2011–2019: Romulo Enmark
- 2019–present: Robert Egnell

=== Deputy Vice-Chancellors ===
- 2005–2006: Brigadier General Tomas Fjellner
- 2006–2008: Colonel Lars Bergström
- 2009–2016: Brigadier General Bengt Axelsson
- 2017–2020: Rear admiral (lower half) Ewa Skoog Haslum
- 2020–2022: Brigadier General Fredrik Ståhlberg
- 2022–2023: Brigadier General Anders Persson
- 2023–present: Major General Anders Callert

== See also ==
- Military Academy Karlberg
- List of universities in Sweden
