= General Staff Corps =

- Generalstabskåren
- Active: 1937–1990
- Country: Sweden
- Allegiance: Swedish Armed Forces
- Branch: Swedish Army
- Type: Administrative corps
- Role: Personnel branch for staff officers
- Size: 104 officers (1984)
- Garrison/HQ: Stockholm, Sweden

Commanders
- Notable commanders: Helge Jung; Stig Synnergren; Lennart Ljung

General Staff Corps (Swedish: Generalstabskåren, Gst) was an administrative corps within the Swedish Armed Forces between 1937 and 1990 and consisted of Swedish Army officers chosen for duty in the Defence Staff and Army Staff. It replaced the earlier General Staff.

== History ==
The General Staff Corps was established on 1 July 1937. Besides adjutants and staff adjutants, it consisted of: 1 colonel (also Chief of the Army Staff), 1 colonel, 5 lieutenant colonels, 12 majors and 34 captains.

In order to gain entry into the General Staff Corps, first priority was to be top of the class at the then Royal Swedish Army Staff College and after that, 2.5 years of employment as a general staff officer candidate in positions at different departments within the staff. Only after successful officer candidate service with approved credentials, the person concerned was able to assume the prestigious general staff insignia, which consisted of a pair of crossed batons.

The officers in the Swedish Army, which were considered to be exceptionally good, were placed in the General Staff Corps. The administrative corps' of the Swedish Armed Forces were abolished by the end of January 1990, and then also the General Staff Corps.

== Commanding officers ==
The commanding officer of the General Staff Corps was also Chief of the Army Staff.
