= Royal Swedish Army Staff College =

Swedish Army Training College

- Kungliga Krigshögskolan
- Type: Staff college
- Active: 1866–1961
- Parent institution: Swedish Armed Forces
- Affiliations: Swedish Army
- Location: Stockholm, Sweden
- Language: Swedish
- Garrison/HQ: Stockholm Garrison

The Royal Swedish Army Staff College (Swedish: Kungliga Krigshögskolan, KHS) was a Swedish Army training establishment between 1866 and 1961, providing courses for army officers. It was the home of the Swedish Army's staff college, which provided advanced training for officers. It was located within the Stockholm Garrison in Stockholm, Sweden.

== History ==
=== 1866–1951 ===
The Royal Swedish Army Staff College was the name which that the former Higher Artillery School (Högre artilleriläroverket) in Marieberg adopted in November 1866. The Swedish Army then received for the first time a training course for staff officers. The initiator of the 1870s reform of the higher officer training was the Chief of the General Staff, Major General Hugo Raab. By promoting an officer training in accordance with academic principles he laid the foundation for today's officer training on a scientific basis. In 1878 the name was passed over to the new educational institution in Stockholm, which would become the academy of military sciences in Sweden. Its purpose was to teach officers increased insights into subjects of war sciences.

Thorough education was communicated in military sciences, such as mathematics, mechanics, physics, chemistry, descriptive geometry, geodesy and architecture. There was a general and a higher course in the majority of the subjects. The teaching time was calculated so that in 5 years, two courses could be completed. One had to pass the course for promotion to lieutenant in the Artillery and the Fortification (Fortifikationen), as well as for entry into the General Staff. The course was two years long. During its first years, it began on 1 August each year with an even order number, and received after entry examination 20-40 officers. Eventually the start of the course was moved to the beginning of October and the end of the school year to July. From 1905, a new course with 25 students started every year, so that two courses could run at the same time.

When the college was established, so was a joint board consisting of one Inspector for the Military Schools (Inspektör för Militärläroverken) and a Military Education Commission (Krigsundervisningskommission). The Inspector for the Military Schools handled all points of order, and the economic objectives and the Military Education Commission handled all issues relating to education. The inspector was officio the chairman of the Commission, whose members were the heads of the General Staff, the Artillery and the Fortification, or those that the King in Council upon their proposals, in their place, appoints, which are the heads of the Royal Swedish Army Staff College and the Royal Military Academy.

=== 1951–1961 ===
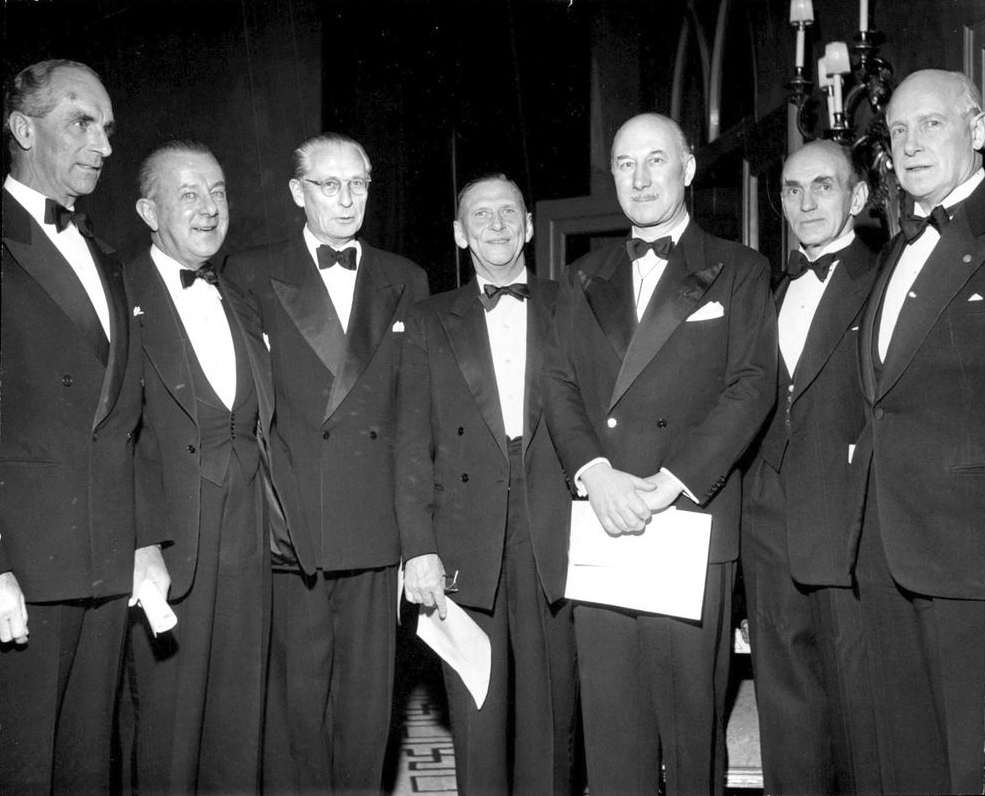
Officers celebrates the 40th anniversary of graduation from the Royal Swedish Army Staff College, 11 December 1955. Colonel Carl-Oscar Agell to the left.

In 1951, the higher courses of the Artillery and Engineering College were incorporated into the Royal Swedish Army Staff College. The school then included a staff programme, a weapon technical programme, an engineer programme and a fortification programme (with students from the Navy and Air Force). The Royal Swedish Army Staff College was discontinued in 1961 and the Royal Swedish Armed Forces Staff College was formed by merging war colleges of the different military branches, namely the Royal Swedish Army Staff College (established in 1878), the Royal Swedish Naval Staff College (established in 1898) and the Royal Swedish Air Force Staff College (established in 1939).

== Location ==
From 1878 the Royal Swedish Army Staff College was located in the building which had been prepare through alterations and extensions of the east wing of the General Staff House (Generalstabens hus) at Schering Rosenhane's Palace at Birger Jarls torg 10 in Stockholm.

== Heads ==
- 1866–1870: Claës Gustaf Breitholtz
- 1870–1878: Knut Henrik Posse
- 1878–1883: Johan Olof Billdau Stecksén
- 1883–1886: Hemming Gadd
- 1886–1889: Adolf Malmborg
- 1889–1891: Carl Axel Nordenskjöld
- 1892–1900: Carl Otto Nordensvan
- 1900–1902: ?
- 1902–1904: Lars Tingsten
- 1904–1906: Carl Johan Birger Sergel
- 1906–1911: Thorsten Rudenschöld
- 1912–1915: Carl A:son Sjögreen
- 1915–1918: Gösta Lilliehöök
- 1918–1919: Oscar Nygren
- 1919–1922: Hugo Wikner
- 1922–1926: Erik Testrup
- 1926–1930: Harald Malmberg
- 1928–1929: Martin Hanngren (acting)
- 1930–1932: Sture Gadd (acting 1929)
- 1932–1935: Folke Högberg
- 1935–1937: Einar Björk
- 1937–1940: Samuel Åkerhielm
- 1939–1939: Magnus Dyrssen (acting)
- 1940–1942: Carl August Ehrensvärd
- 1941–1942: Viking Tamm (acting 1941)
- 1942–1946: Richard Åkerman
- 1946–1949: Hilding Kring
- 1949–1952: Carl Fredrik Lemmel
- 1952–1955: Hadar Cars
- 1955–1959: Gunnar af Klintberg
- 1959–1961: Erik Rosengren

== See also ==
- Royal Swedish Air Force Staff College
- Royal Swedish Naval Staff College
