= Army Staff (Sweden) =

Staff element of the Chief of the Swedish Army

- Arméstaben
- Coat of arms of the Swedish Army Staff.
- Active: 1937–1994, 2019–present
- Country: Sweden
- Allegiance: Swedish Armed Forces
- Branch: Swedish Army
- Type: Staff
- Role: Operational, territorial and tactical operations
- Garrison/HQ: Enköping

Commanders
- Chief of Staff: Col Dan Rasmussen

Insignia
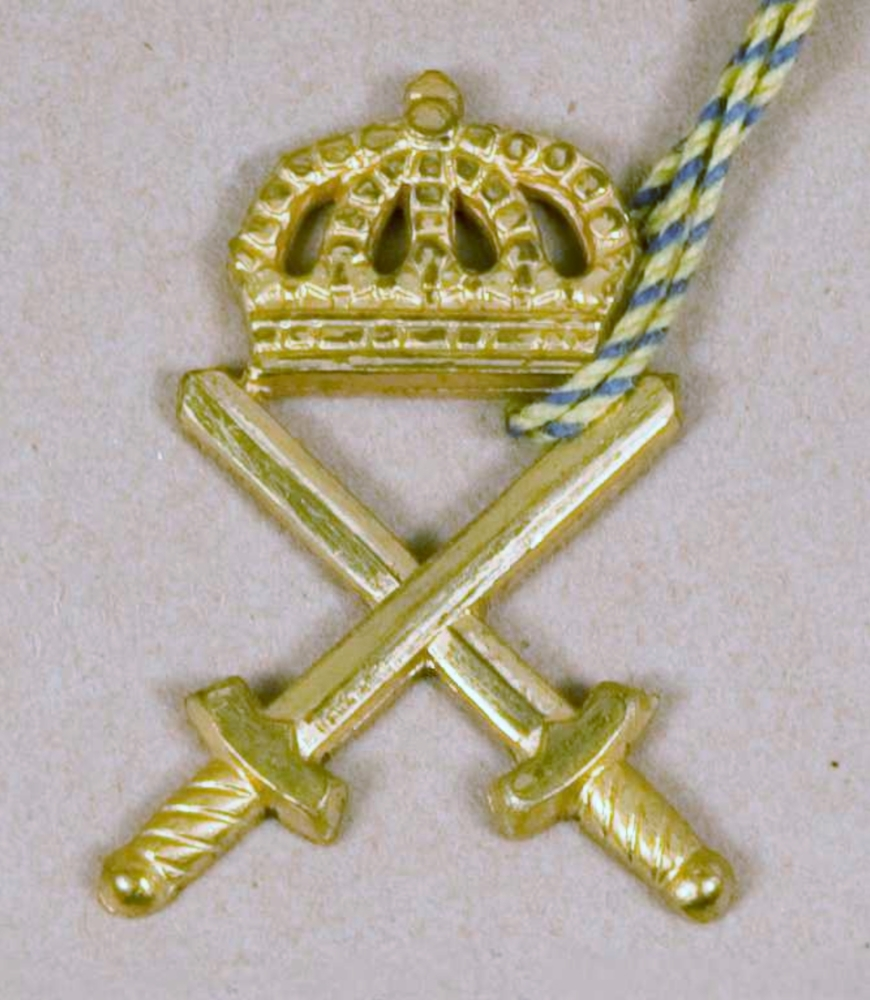
- Insignia m/1960

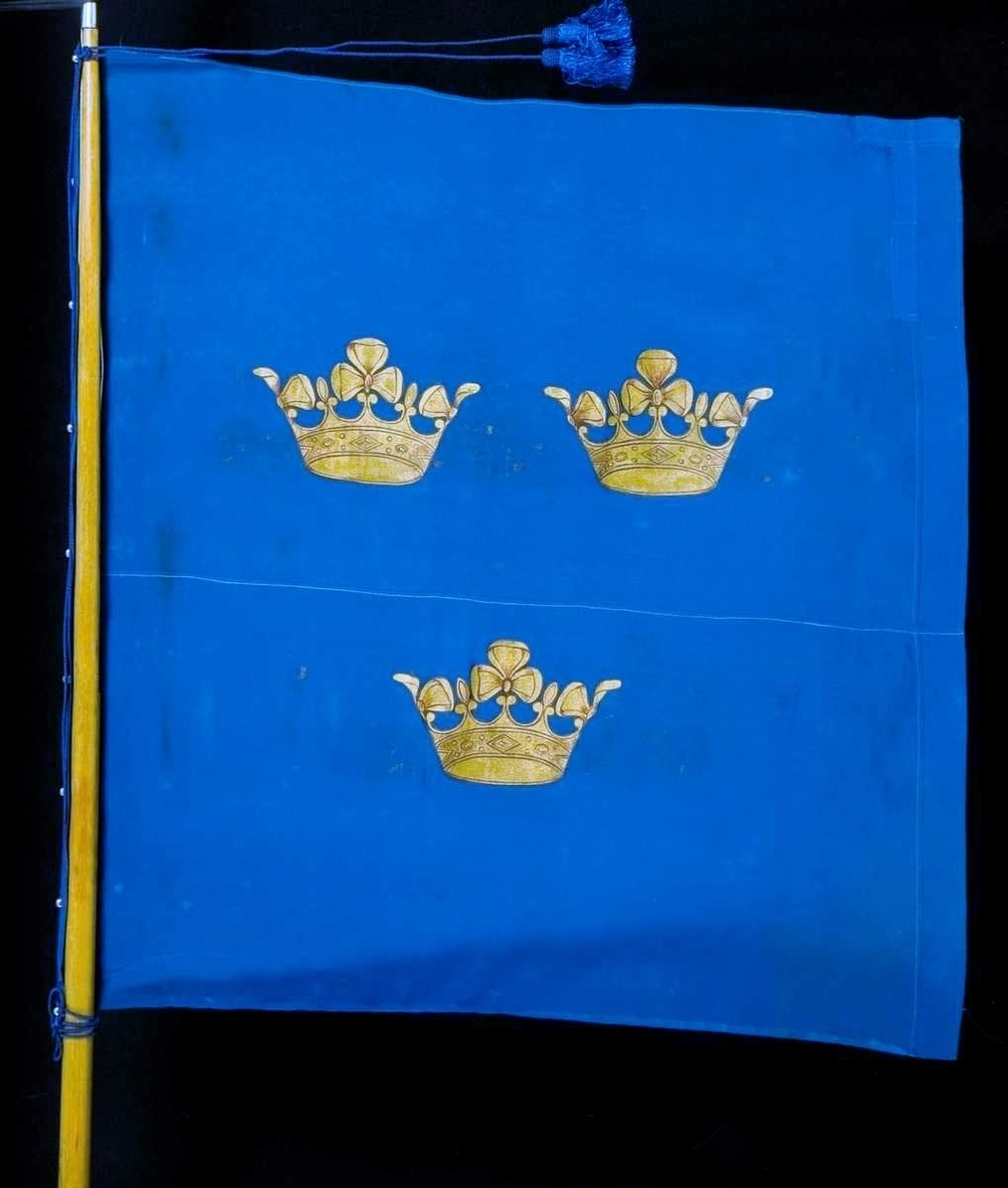
- Command flag m/1902

Army Staff (Swedish: Arméstaben, Ast) is the staff of the Chief of the Swedish Army. It was originally established in 1937. The Army Staff's duties then included, among other things to assist the Chief of the Army with leadership of the Army's mobilization, training, tactics, organization, equipment and personnel to the extent that such activity was not directly related to operational activities, which was handled by the Defence Staff. In 1994 the Swedish Armed Forces Headquarters took over the Army Staff's duties. In 2019, the Army Staff was re-established, now located in Enköping Garrison.

== History ==
=== 1937–1963 ===
On 1 July 1937, the position of Chief of the Army (Chefen för armén) was established. The Chief of the Army would under the King in Council exercise the highest military leadership of the country defence. At his side, the Chief of the Army had an Army Staff to assist the Chief of the Army in his duties. Within the Army Staff the work was initially conducted in the following departments: Office with Cash Management, Organization Department, Education Department and Personnel Department. The inspection activities in the army were carried out by independent inspectorates, military branch inspectors and service branch inspectors. Regarding the inspection activities for the Swedish Army Signal Troops and in the respect of the technical signal within the army in general, this was exercised by the staff of the Army Staff and the Chief of the Signal Troops.

The instruction for the Chief of the Army (SFS 1937/669) was replaced in 1942 by the King in Council's instructions for the Army Command (Arméledningen). The term Army Command was used as the official term from 1942 to 1948, and partly later, for the Chief of the Army with the Army Staff. The Army Command consisted of the Chief of the Army and the Army Staff, the Recruiting and Replacement Office (Centrala värnpliktsbyrån), the Army Inspection, the Chief of Home Guard along with the Home Guard Staff, the service branch inspectors, the Chief of the Army directly subordinate to administrative corps chiefs and the Royal Swedish Army Materiel Administration.

Work within the Army Staff was conducted in an Organization Department, Equipment Department and a Personnel Department. There was also an office and a library as well as the Army Staff's stable (SFS 1942/863). Within the Army Inspection was now the military branch departments. New instructions for the Army Command came in 1949 (SFS 1949/600). The Army Inspectorate ceased and the military branch inspectors with departments was now incorporated into the Army Staff. The Army Staff was divided into two sections, Section 1 included the Organizational Department, Equipment Department and a Section Office and Section II included the Tactics Department, Education Department, the library and the Section Office. The Personnel Department was outside the sections. In the Personnel Department there was a Press and Adjutant Department. Additionally was the military branch departments. In 1959, the Section III was added, which included Personnel Department, Press Department and a Section Office.

=== 1964–1994 ===
In June 1964, the Army Staff's new organization was established (TLA 1964:32). The staff was according to the instruction organized in three sections, six military branch inspectors with eight military branch departments and a head's office. Section I handled the activities related to the army's peace and war organization, equipment and studies. Section 2 was responsible for matters concerning the army's tactics, training and intelligence. Section 3 was responsible for the army personnel and press service. The military branch inspectors lead among other things, tests and some training. The military branch departments was the staff bodies of the military branch inspectors.

In March 1976, the Army Staff had about 380 employees. The Army Staff was in connection with the Swedish Armed Forces restructuring on 1 July 1994 amalgamated into the Swedish Armed Forces Headquarters as the Army Command (Arméledningen).

=== 2019–present ===
In February 2018, the Swedish Armed Forces proposed in its budget for 2019 to the Government a reorganization of the Swedish Armed Forces' leadership. The proposal was, among other things, designed with a new management and new organizational units in new locations. This to provide better conditions for a robust and sustainable management. The new organizational units that the Swedish Armed Forces wished to form were proposed to be called the Army Staff, the Air Staff and Naval Staff. These would be formed by a merger of the Training & Procurement Staff and the Joint Forces Command, as well as other complementary parts from, among other things, the Swedish Armed Forces Headquarters and the Defence Materiel Administration. The staffs were proposed to be formed on 1 January 2019 and commanded by an army chief, a naval chief and an air force chief. On 22 November 2018, the Government proposed to the Riksdag to set up organizational units in the form of an Army Staff, a Naval Staff and an Air Staff. The Riksdag authorized the Government to do so by adopting its bill on 18 December 2018. On 20 December, the Government decided to set up the Army Staff as a separate organizational unit and place it to Enköping Garrison. On 16 January 2019, the Army Staff were inaugurated with a traditional ceremony in Enköping Garrison. In addition to the personnel from the Army Staff, the municipal council chairman of Enköping, Ingvar Smedlund, Chief of Army, major general Karl Engelbrektsson, Deputy Chief of Army, brigadier general Fredrik Ståhlberg and the commander of the Command and Control Regiment, colonel Mattias Hanson, attended. The staff was inaugurated almost on the day 21 years after the Army Tactical Center (ATAC) was inaugurated in Enköping on 7 January 1998.

== Location ==
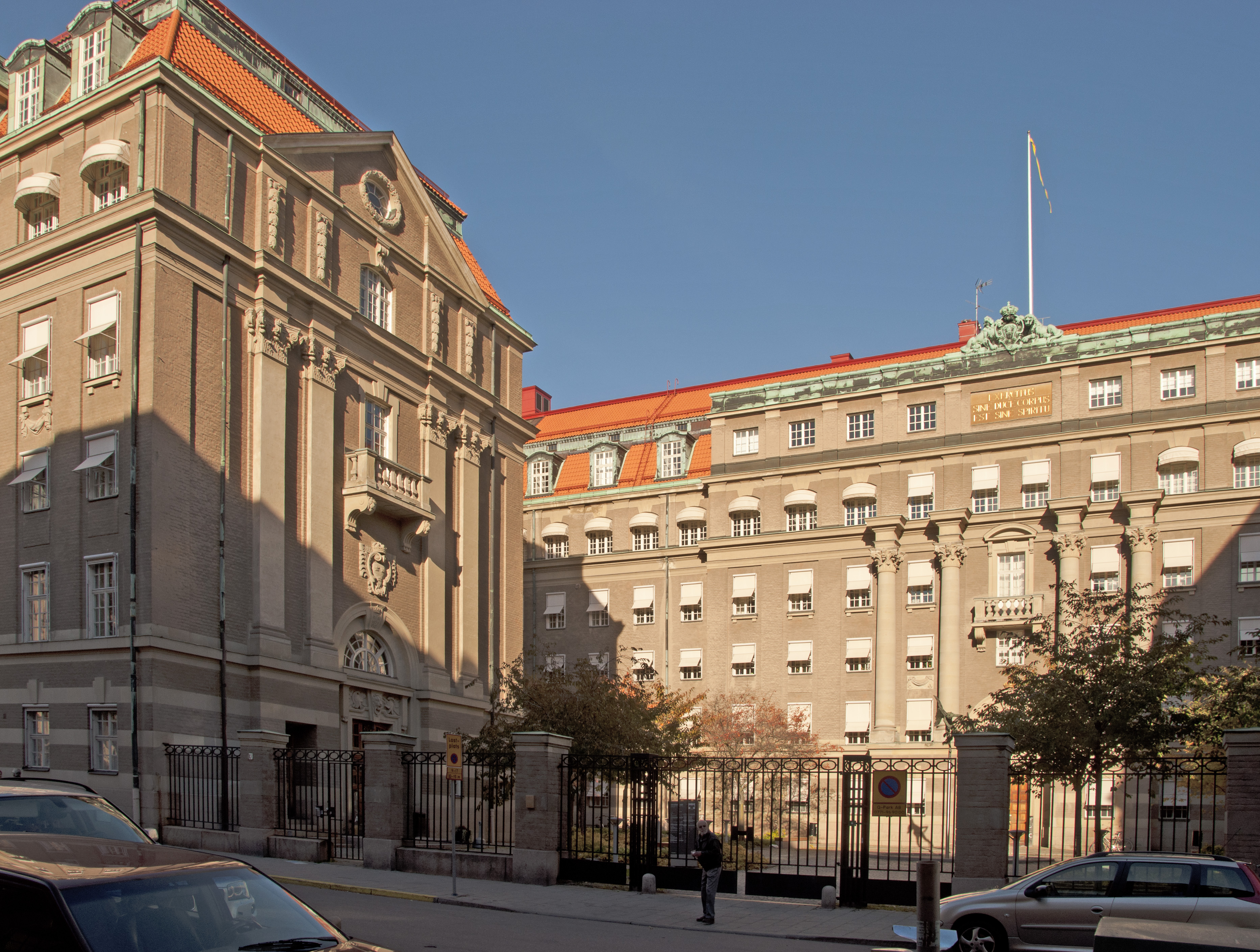
The main part of the Army Staff was located at Östermalmsgatan 87 and seven other places in the Stockholm area.

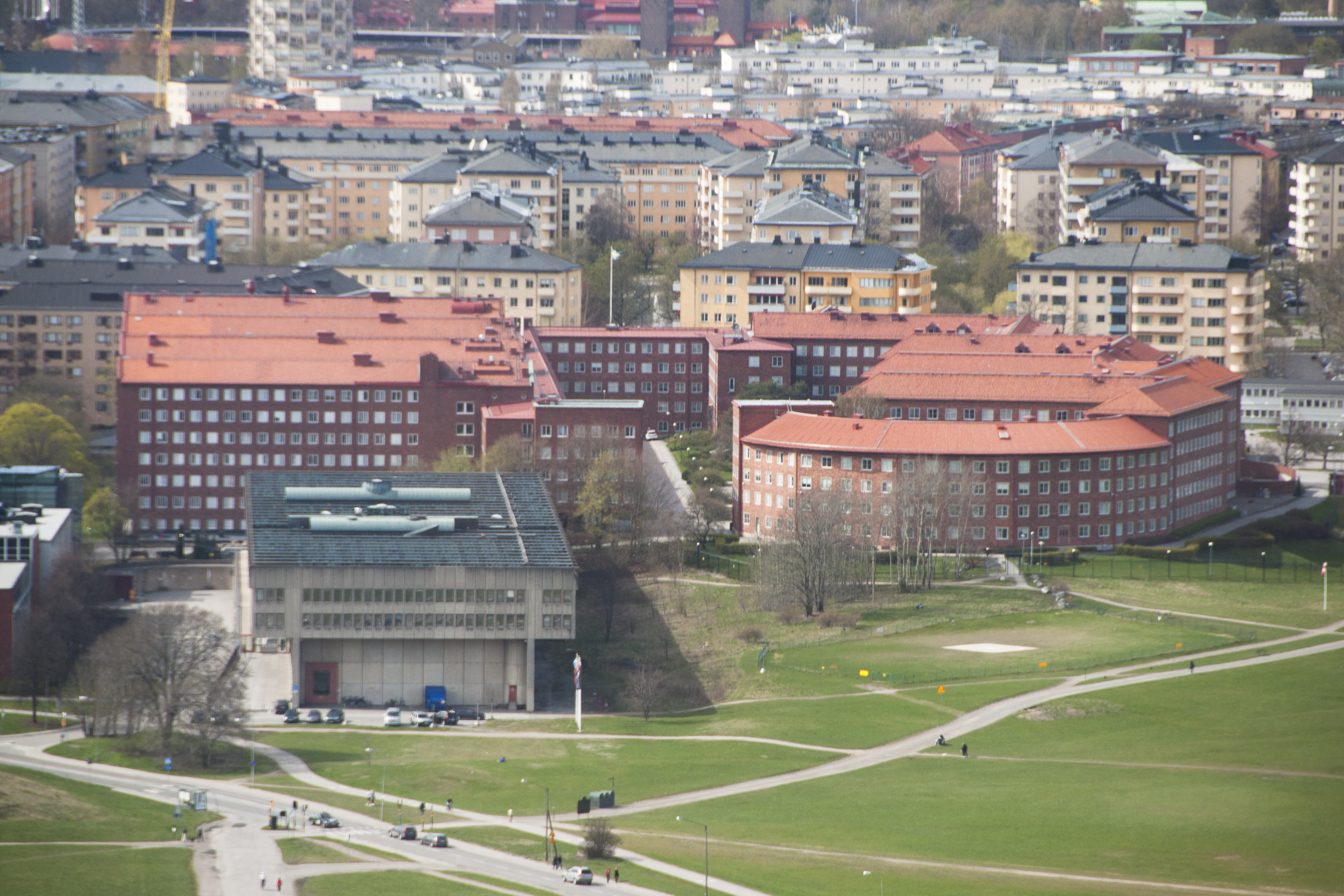
Some parts of the Army Staff was located in these red buildings at Banérgatan 62-64 from 1943 to 1981.

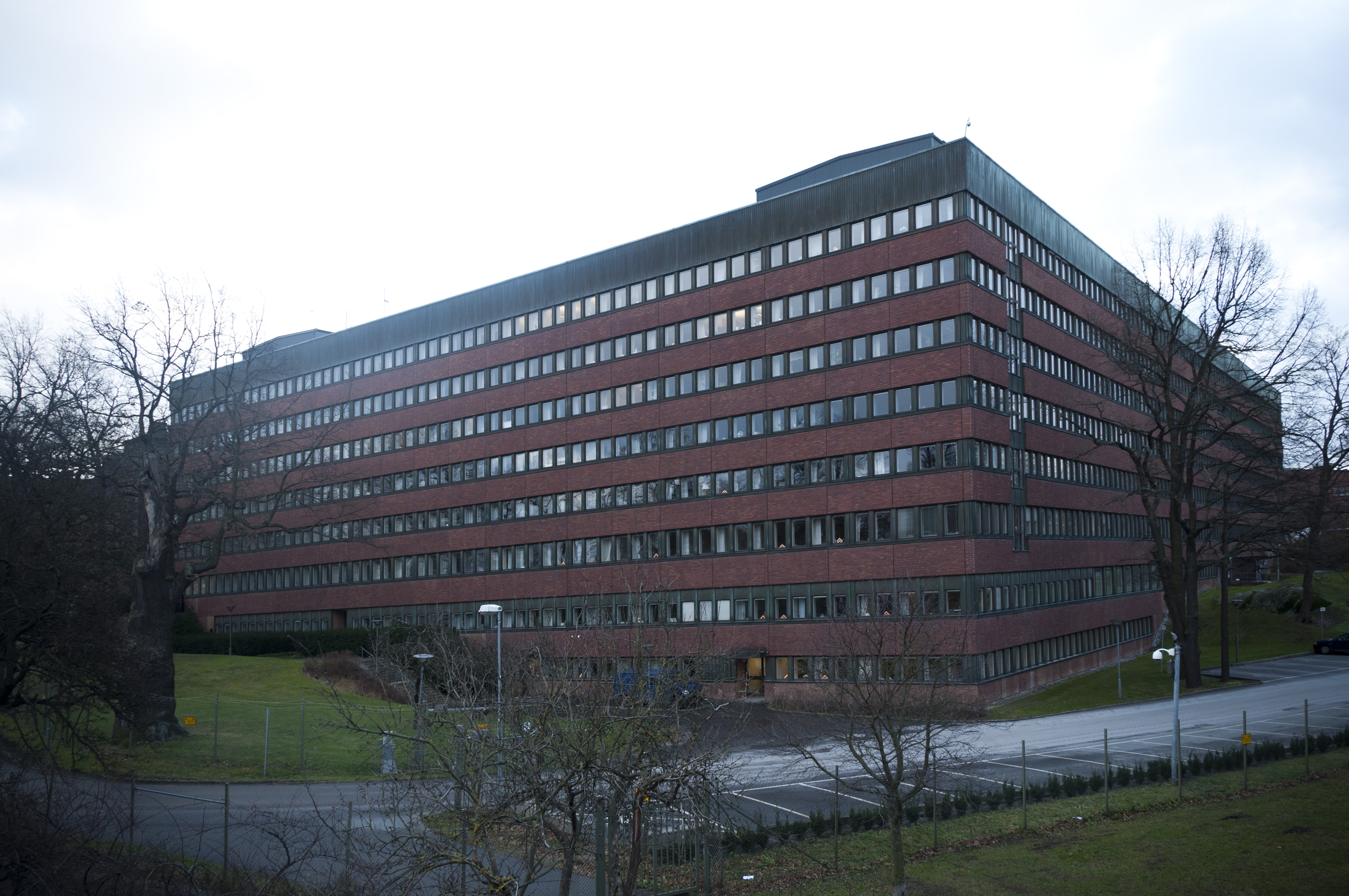
The Army Staff was located at Lidingövägen 24 from 1981 to 1994.

The main part of the Army Staff was located in the building Generalitetshuset at Östermalmsgatan 87 and at seven other places in the Stockholm area. Some parts of the Army Staff was from 1943 to 1981 located in the building Tre Vapen at Banérgatan 62-64 in Stockholm. In 1981 it moved to the building Bastionen at Lidingövägen 24 in Stockholm.

The location of the new Army Staff was proposed by the Swedish Armed Forces to be established in Enköping garrison next to the Command and Control Regiment. As an alternative, there was also a location in Kungsängen Garrison. Initially, the Army Staff will temporarily be located together with the Ledningsstridsskolan (LedSS) in the School House in Enköping Garrison. Where within the garrison the staff will finally be located is not yet established (January 2019) but a development group appointed by the garrison commander is tasked with investigating the issue and presenting proposals.

== Heraldry ==
The coat of arms of the Army Staff. It was later used by the Army Command (Arméledningen, AL) from 1994 to 1997. Blazon: "Azure, the lesser coat of arms of Sweden, three open crowns or placed two and one. The shield surmounted two swords in saltire or".

== Chiefs ==
=== Chiefs of the Army Staff ===
- 1936–1937: Ernst af Klercker
- 1937–1940: Helge Jung
- 1940–1942: Folke Högberg
- 1942–1943: Henry Tottie
- 1943–1946: Hugo Gadd
- 1946–1948: Ivar Backlund
- 1948–1953: Viking Tamm
- 1953–1957: Bert Carpelan
- 1957–1961: Gustav Åkerman
- 1961–1963: Arne Mohlin
- 1963–1966: Stig Synnergren
- 1966–1968: Ove Ljung
- 1966–1968: Karl Eric Holm (acting)
- 1968–1972: Karl Eric Holm
- 1972–1974: Lennart Ljung
- 1974–1979: Gösta Hökmark
- 1979–1983: Robert Lugn
- 1983–1988: Krister Larsson
- 1988–1990: Curt Sjöö
- 1990–1994: Lennart Rönnberg
- 2019–2022: Dag Lidén
- 2022–2026: Stefan Jansson
- 2026–present: Dan Rasmussen

=== Vice Chiefs of the Army Staff ===
- 1942–1944: Gunnar Möller
- 1944–1944: Rolf Lindquist
- 1945–1947: Bert Carpelan
- 1947–1948: Adolf Norberg
- 1949–1950: Miles Flach

== Names, designations and locations ==
Name	Translation	From		To
Arméstaben	Army Staff	1937-07-01	–	1994-06-30
Arméstaben	Army Staff	2019-01-01	–	
Designation		From		To
Ast		1937-07-01	–	1994-06-30
AST		2019-01-01	–	
Location		From		To
Stockholm Garrison		1937-07-01	–	1994-06-30
Enköping Garrison		2019-01-01	–	
