= Uppland Regiment (signals) =

Military unit in Sweden

- Upplands regemente
- Active: 1902–2006
- Country: Sweden
- Allegiance: Swedish Armed Forces
- Branch: Swedish Army
- Type: Signal
- Size: Regiment
- Part of: IV Army Division (1902–1927); Eastern Army Division (1928–1936); IV Army Division (1937–1942); IV Military District (1942–1966); Eastern Military District (1966–1991); Middle Military District (1991–2000); SWAFHQ (2000-2006)
- Garrison/HQ: Enköping
- Mottos: Här finns inga omöjligheter ("There are no impossibilities here")
- Colors: Red and yellow
- March: "Utgångsmarsch" (Bergström) (Note: The march was established on 26 April 1976 by TFG 760150.)
- Battle honours: Varberg (1565), Narva (1581), Lützen (1632), Warszawa (1656), Frederiksodde (1657), March Across the Belts (1658), Rügen (1678), Düna (1701), Kliszow (1702), Holovczyn (1708), Helsingborg (1710), Svensksund (1790)

Insignia
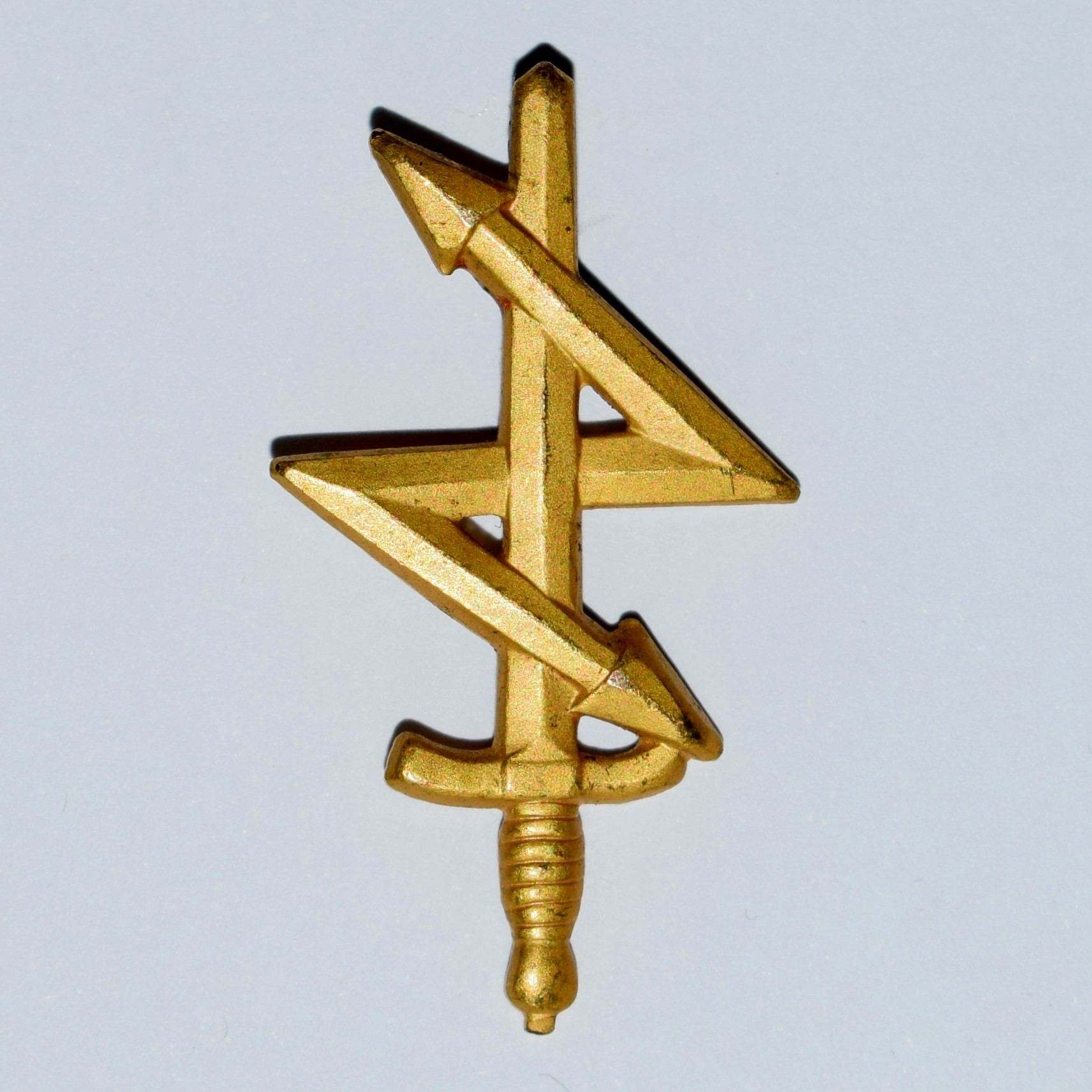
- Branch insignia

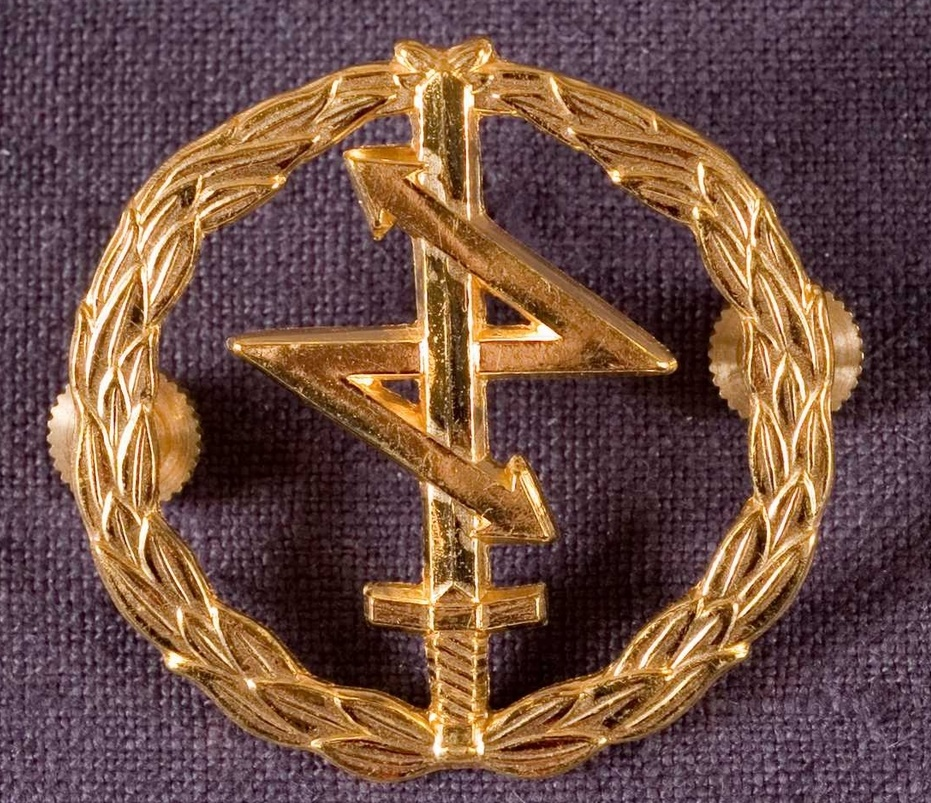
- Cap badge

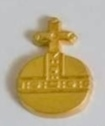
- Unit insignia m/1960

The Uppland Regiment (Swedish: Upplands regemente), designations Ing 3, S 1 and S 1/Fo 47, was a Swedish Army signal regiment that traced its origins back to the 19th century. It was disbanded in 2006. The regiment was garrisoned in Uppland.

== History ==
The regiment has its origins in the field signal (later telegraphy) company raised in 1871 and subordinated to Pontoon Battalion in 1875. The company was redesignated as the Field Telegraph Corps and with designation Ing 3 (3rd Engineer Regiment) in 1902 when it became independent. An aircraft squadron was created in 1916 and split from the unit in 1926, this squadron would later become the Swedish Air Force.

The unit was reorganised and renamed to Signal Regiment with the designation S 1 (1st Signal Regiment) when the Swedish Army Signal Troops became a separate arm in 1937. A in 1915 detached company of the unit later became Norrland Signal Regiment and another in 1944 detached company later became Göta Signal Regiment.

It was renamed to Uppland Signal Regiment in 1957 and in 1974 to Uppland Regiment. The same name was used by the infantry regiment Uppland Regiment, although the signal regiment does not trace its origins from this regiment, even though the victory names were transferred to the signal regiment.

In 1974, the regiment gained the new designation S 1/Fo 47 as a consequence of a merge with the local defence district Fo 47. The designation was changed back to S 1 in 2000 when the defence district was disbanded. Uppland Regiment was disbanded in 2006 but was replaced by the Command and Control Regiment which took the role that the regiment previously had.

== Heraldry and traditions ==
=== Coat of arms ===
The coat of the arms of the Uppland Regiment (S 1/Fo 47) 1974–2000 and the Uppland Regiment (S 1) 2000–2006. Blazon: "Gules, the provincial badge of Uppland, a mound or, banded and ensigned with a cross-crosslet. The shield surmounted a cluster of bolts, or".

=== Colours, standards and guidons ===
Uppland Regiment presented two regimental colours.

==== First colour of S 1 ====
The colour was presented to the regiment by His Majesty the King Carl XVI Gustaf in Enköping on 4 November 1976. The colour is drawn by Mrs Westberg and is embroidered by hand in insertion technique by the company Libraria. Blazon: "On blue cloth in the centre the lesser coat of arms of Sweden, three open yellow crowns placed two and one. In the first corner a mullet with a cluster of rays, all yellow. In the lower part of the rays, placed upon a cluster of yellow bolts, the provincial coat-of-arms of Uppland; gules an orb, banded and ensigned with a cross-crosslet, or. The shield ensigned with a royal crown proper."

==== Second colour of S 1 ====
The colour was presented to the regiment in Enköping by the Supreme Commander, general Johan Hederstedt on 20 May 2000. The colour replaced an older which was presented to the former Royal Uppland Regiment (I 8) in 1955 and which was handed over to S 1 in 1957. The colour is drawn by Kristina Holmgård-Åkerberg and embroidered by hand in insertion technique by Sofie Thorburn. Blazon: "On red cloth the provincial badge of Uppland; a yellow orb, banded and ensigned with a cross-crosslet. On a yellow border at the upper side of the colour, battle honours (Varberg 1565, Narva 1581, Lützen 1632, Warszawa 1656, Frederiksodde 1657, March Across the Belts 1658, Rügen 1678, Düna 1701, Kliszow 1702, Holovczyn 1708, Helsingborg 1710, Svensksund 1790) in red."

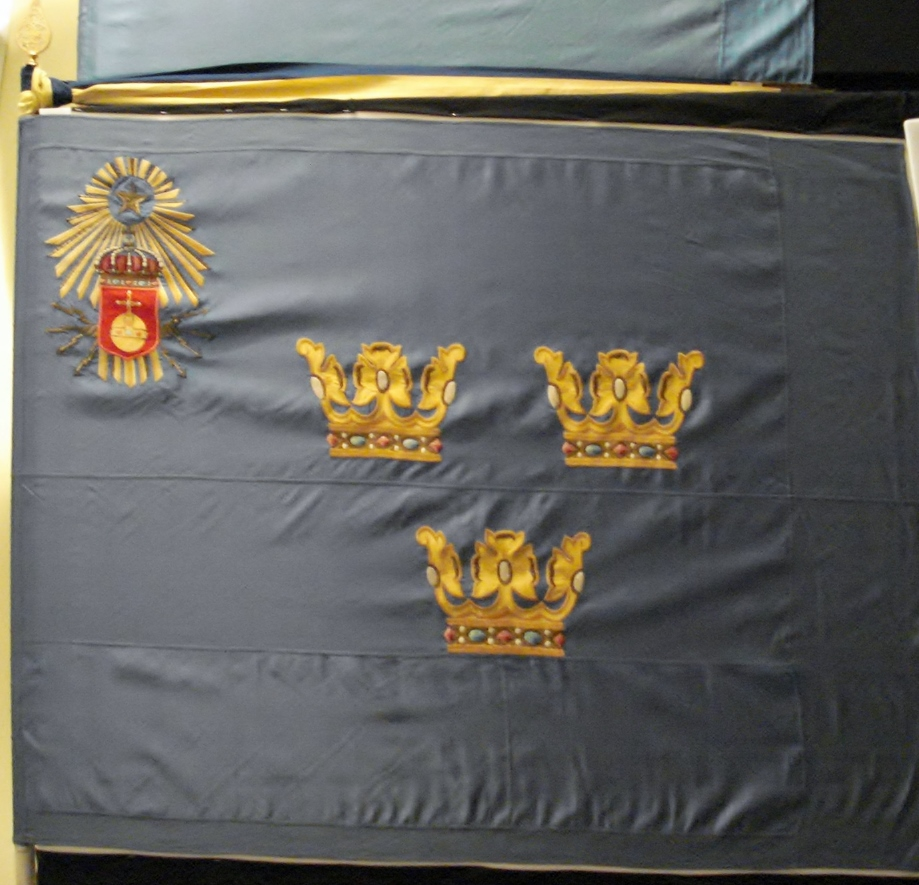
Colour presented in 1935 by His Majesty the King Gustav V in connection with 300th anniversary of Swedish Fortification Corps. The provincial badge of Uppland attached in 1959 in the upper inner corner, where originally the lesser coat of arms of Sweden was.

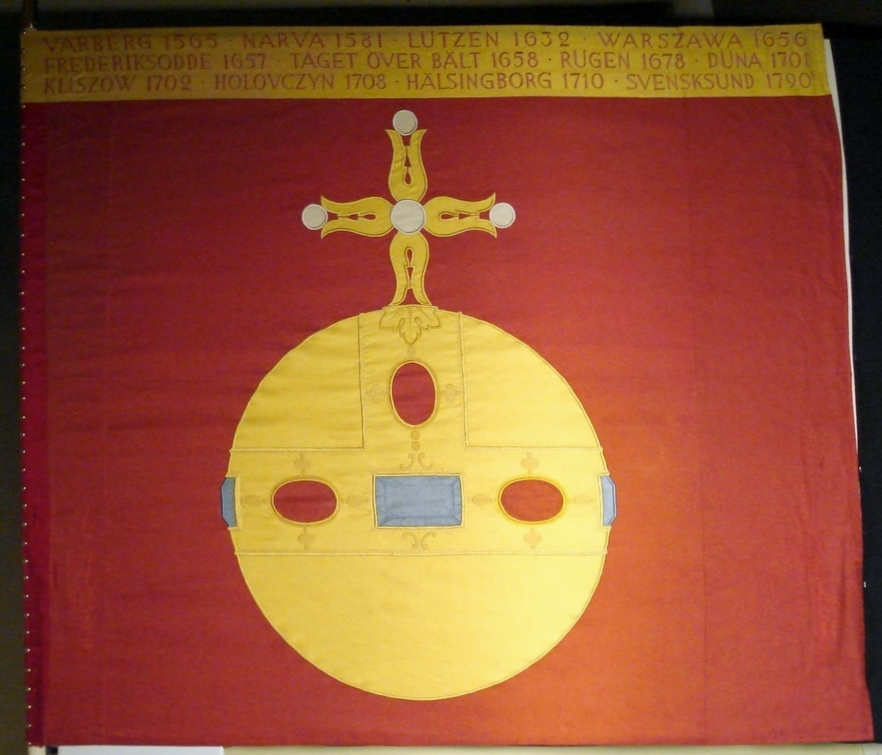
Colour of Uppland Regiment (I 8/S 1) which was presented to the regiment by His Majesty the King Gustaf VI Adolf in 1955.

=== Medals ===
In 2000, the Upplands regementes (S 1) förtjänstmedalj ("Uppland Regiment (S 1) Medal of Merit") in gold and silver (UpplregGM/SM) of the 8th size was established. The medal ribbon is divided in red and yellow moiré.

In 2000, the Uppland-Västmanlands försvarsområdes (Fo 47/48) minnesmedalj ("Uppland-Västmanland Defence District (Fo 47/48) Commemorative Medal") in silver (UpplVästmlfoSMM) of the 8th size was established. The medal ribbon is of red moiré with two thinly placed yellow stripes on the middle.

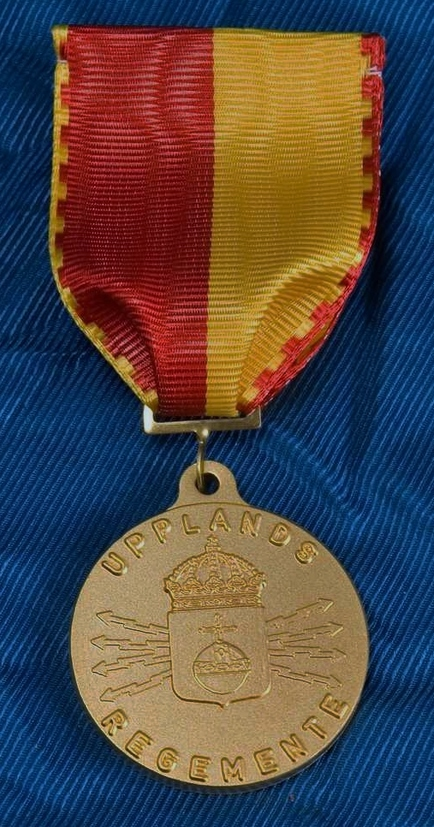
Uppland Regiment (S 1) Medal of Merit in gold.

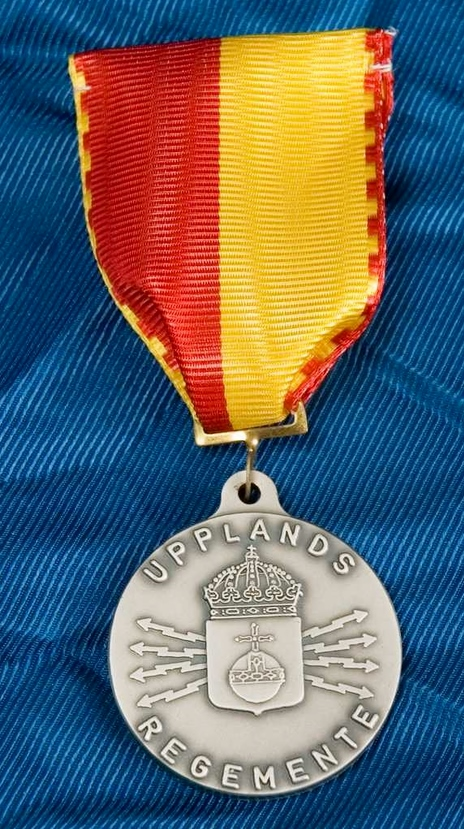
Uppland Regiment (S 1) Medal of Merit in silver.

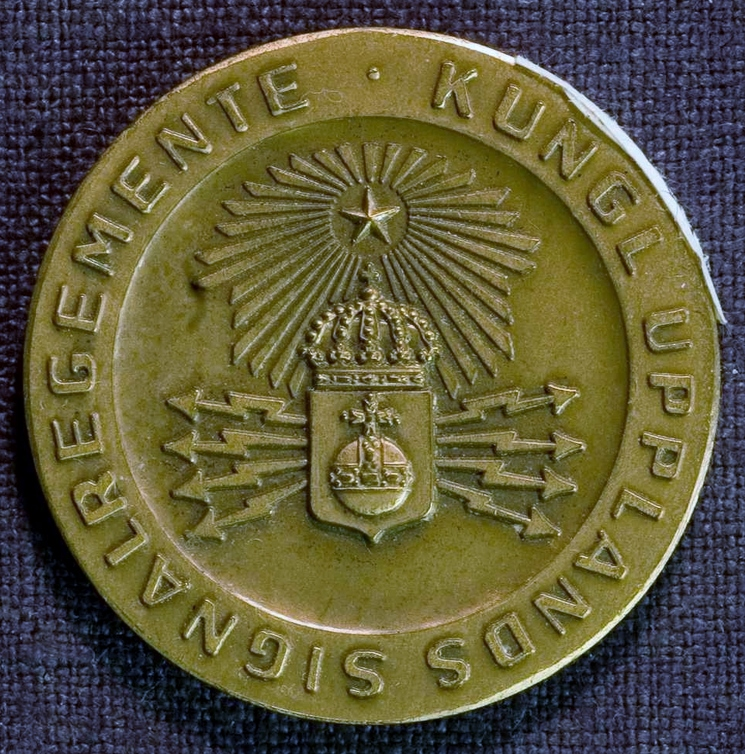
The 1975 Uppland Regiment Commemorative Medal.

== Commanding officers ==
- 1902–1904: Nils Gustaf Stedt (also commanding officer of Ing 1)
- 1904–1907: Georg Frans Herman Julius Juhlin-Dannfelt
- 1907–1912: Broder Sten A:son Leijonhufvud
- 1912–1915: Carl Adolf Alfred Murray
- 1915–1920: Karl Albert Byron Amundson
- 1920–1924: Erik Conrad Erikson
- 1924–1925: Karl Albert Byron Amundson
- 1925–1927: Carl Eggert Nauclér
- 1928–1932: Torsten Friis
- 1932–1942: Gottfried Hain
- 1942–1945: Harald Hægermark
- 1945–1948: Nils Åke Sundberg
- 1948–1957: Casa Crafoord
- 1957–1963: Sven Almqvist
- 1963–1968: Ivar Syberg
- 1968–1971: Lennart Ljung
- 1971–1974: Arne Risling
- 1974–1976: Curt W Helmfrid
- 1976–1982: Carl-Ivar Lindgren
- 1982–1990: Fredrik Lilliecreutz
- 1990–1999: Lennart Johansson
- 1999–2000: Björn Karlsson
- 2000–2004: Lars-Olof G Johansson
- 2004–2006: Mats O Blom

== Names, designations and locations ==
| Name | Translation | From | | To |
|---|---|---|---|---|
| Kungl Fälttelegrafkåren | Royal Field Telegraph Corps | 1902 | – | 1937-06-30 |
| Kungl Signalregementet | Royal Signal Regiment | 1937-07-01 | – | 1957-03-31 |
| Kungl Upplands signalregemente | Royal Uppland Signal Regiment | 1957-04-01 | – | 1974-06-30 |
| Kungl Upplands regemente | Royal Uppland Regiment | 1974-07-01 | – | 1974-12-31 |
| Upplands regemente | Uppland Regiment | 1975-01-01 | – | 2006-12-31 |
| Designation | | From | | To |
| Ing 3 | | 1902-01-01 | – | 1937-06-30 |
| S 1 | | 1937-07-01 | – | 1974-06-30 |
| S 1/Fo 47/48 | | 1974-07-01 | – | 1990-06-30 |
| S 1/Fo 47 | | 1990-07-01 | – | 2000-06-30 |
| S 1 | | 2000-07-01 | – | 2006-12-31 |
| Location | | From | | To |
| Stockholm Garrison | | 1902 | – | 1957-03-31 |
| Uppsala Garrison | | 1957-04-01 | – | 1982-05-30 |
| Enköping Garrison | | 1982-06-01 | – | 2006-12-31 |

== See also ==
- List of Swedish signal regiments
