= Swedish Army Signal Troops =

Signal Troops of the Swedish Army

- Signaltrupperna
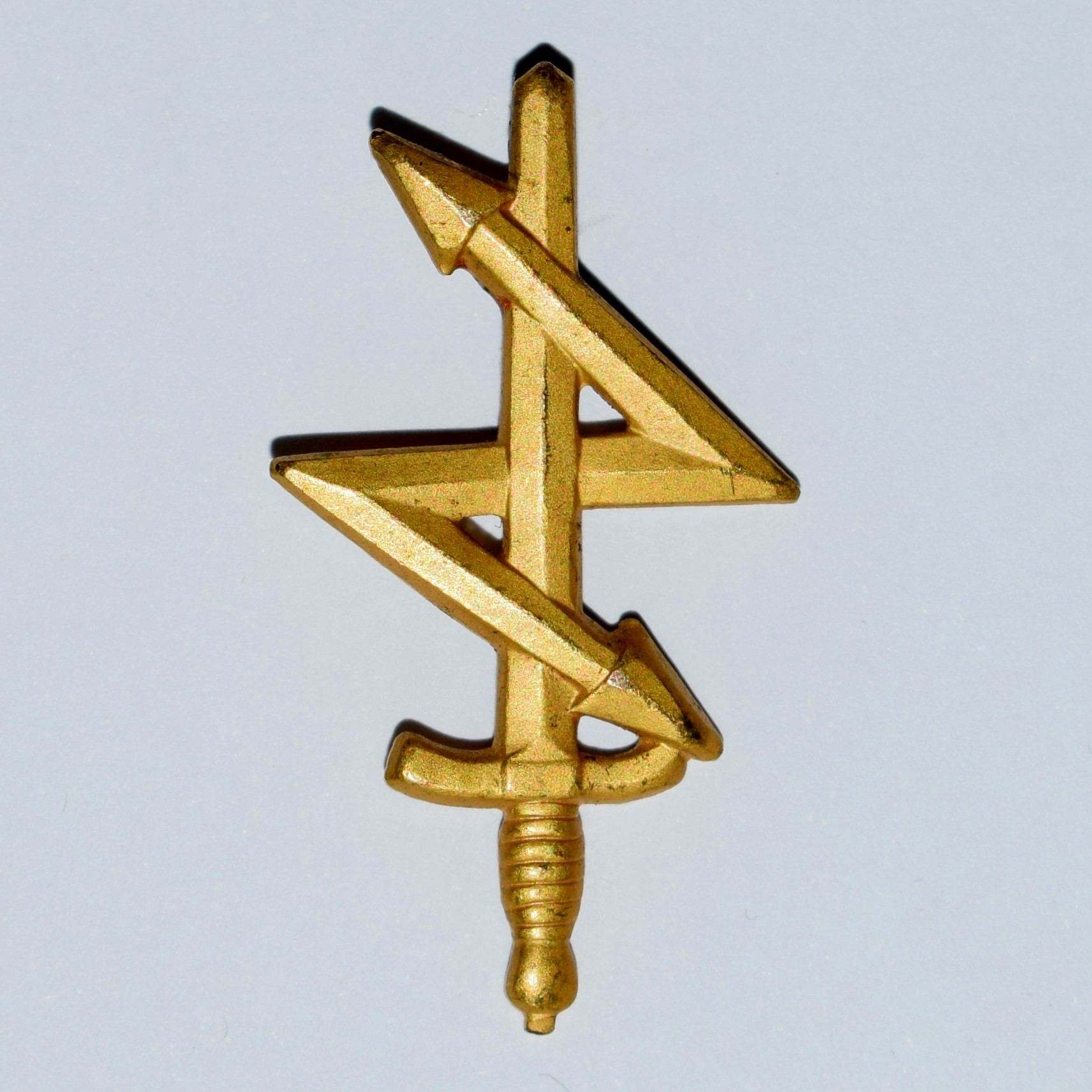
- Branch insignia m/60.
- Active: 1937–present
- Country: Sweden
- Allegiance: Swedish Armed Forces
- Branch: Swedish Army
- Type: Signal corps
- Part of: Swedish Armed Forces Headquarters (Note: The branch was subordinate the Inspector of the Swedish Army Signal Corps (Signalinspektören) at the Signal Department of the Army Staff from 1942 to 1991. After that, it was subordinate to the commander of the Swedish Army Staff and Communication Center (1991–1997), the commander of the Swedish Army Center (1997–2000), the Joint Forces Command (2000–2005), and the Swedish Armed Forces Headquarters from 2005.)

Insignia
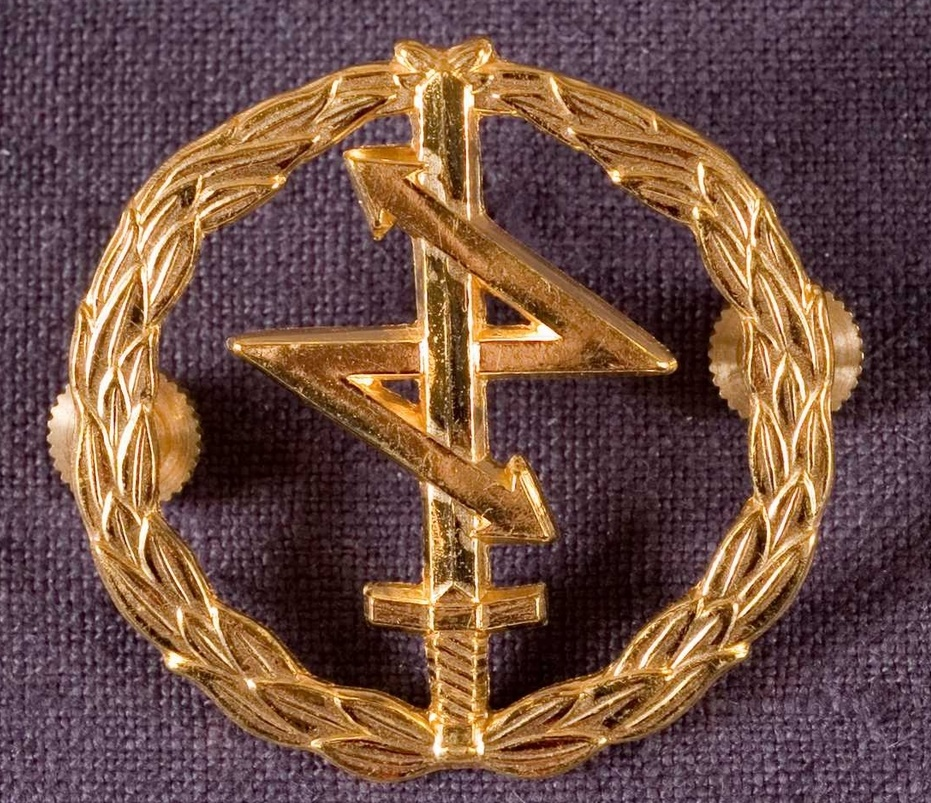
- Cap badge

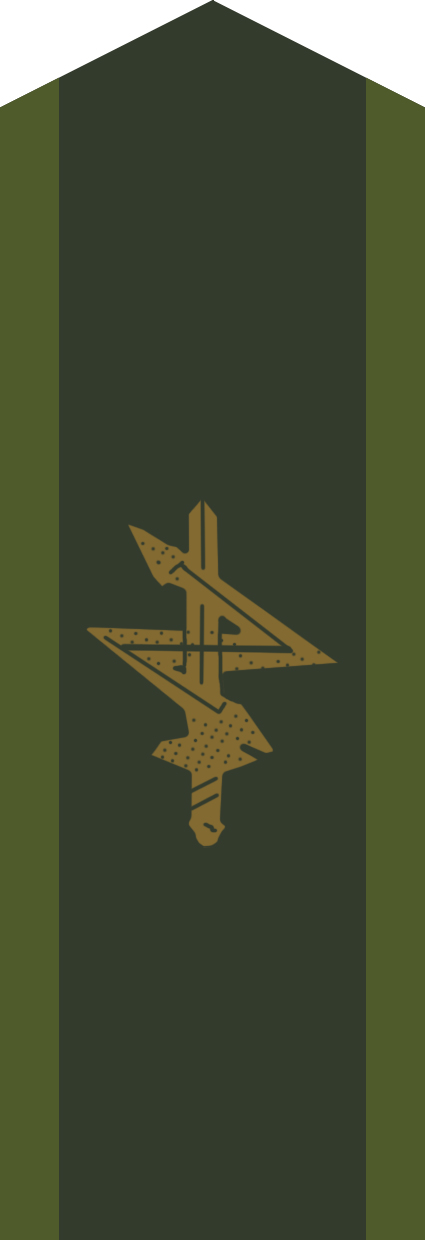
- Gorget patch

The Swedish Army Signal Troops (Swedish: Signaltrupperna, S) is the signal branch of the Swedish Army. It is responsible for installing, maintaining and operating all types of telecommunications equipment and information systems, providing command support to commanders and their headquarters, and conducting electronic warfare against enemy communications.

== History ==
The Swedish Army Signal Troops were organized in accordance with the Defence Act of 1936 as a special branch of the field telegraph troops which belonged to the Swedish Fortification Corps. A large number of officers from the Signal Troops were assigned for duty at higher staff positions.

The Swedish Army Signal Troops have their origins in the field signal company, which was established in 1871 by recruited personnel, consisting of 4 officers, 4 non-commissioned officers, and 120 men, including corporals, musicians, craftsmen, and soldiers, along with 10 horses. However, the company belonged to the fortification troops (fortifikationstrupperna). In 1872, the company took part in a military exercise in Uppland under the command of Oscar II and received much praise for constructing a "whole" 5 km single-wire line for telegraphy. The first telephone was introduced in 1880, a Bell telephone with a ground stand. In 1887, something resembling a field telephone was introduced, along with the first cryptographic device for encryption. In 1892, the company was renamed the Field Telegraph Company, and through the 1901 army order, the Field Telegraph Corps was organized. In 1908, it moved to Marieberg, Stockholm, but already two years earlier, experiments began not only with spark-gap transmitter but also with military ballooning and aviation equipment: here was the embryo of the Swedish Air Force.

In 1914, an initially quite improvised aviation company emerged, and the following year, field telephones were introduced. Radio and balloon companies were relocated to Lilla Frösunda, and the aviation company to Malmslätt. At this time, a new signaling method also appeared - the war pigeon.

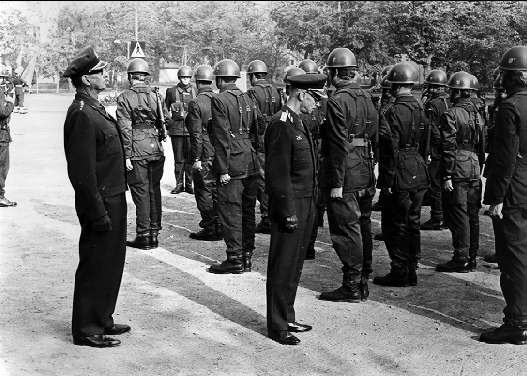
Line-up of signal troops at Göta Signal Regiment (S 2) in 1984.

A pigeon loft existed at the old Göta Life Guards. When the regiment was disbanded, the pigeons moved to Lilla Frösunda. They were not properly organized until 1935 when the Swedish Army Pigeon Service (Arméns brevduveväsende) was established. It remained until 1948.

With the Defence Act of 1936, the Swedish Army Signal Troops were established. The Signal Regiment (S 1) was organized in Stockholm and received a company, S 1 B, in Boden. From 1940 to 1942, it moved to Lilla Frösunda. In 1942, the Swedish Army Signal School (1942–1965) was established, and S 1 received an additional company in Stockholm, one in Skövde (S 1 Sk), and one in Kristianstad (S 1 K). In 1954, S 1 B became a battalion, and in 1957, S 1 moved to Uppsala in the so-called Mälardal Carousel. In 1958, the company in Skövde was expanded into a battalion, in 1961 it moved to Karlsborg and became a signal corps, and in 1962 it became the Göta Signal Corps (S 2). The Signal School moved to Uppsala in 1957 and in 1965 became the Swedish Army School of Staff Work and Communications (Arméns stabs- och sambandsskola, StabSbS) (1965–1998), which in turn was part of the Swedish Army Staff and Communication Center (Arméns lednings- och sambandscentrum, LSC) (1991–1997) along with the Army Staff's Signal Department (Arméstabens signalavdelning) and (Signaltruppernas officershögskola, SignOHS). The Swedish Army Signal Cadet and Officer Candidate School (Signaltruppernas kadett- och aspirantskola, SignKAS) was active from 1961 to 1981 when it became a part of the Swedish Army School of Staff Work and Communications.

On 4 September 1971, the 100th anniversary of the Signal Troops was celebrated with Colonel Åke Bernström and Major General Gottfrid Hain laying a wreath at the memorial stone (the Marieberg Stone) in Marieberg, Stockholm. The jubilee was celebrated, among other things, with a large exhibition of signal equipment at the Swedish Army Museum.

Today's signal troops mainly include staff and military communications units, and electronic warfare units. The Command and Control Regiment in Enköping has since 2007 taken over the previous tasks of the signal troops.

== Inspector of the Swedish Army Signal Troops ==
The chief of the signal troops was referred to as the Inspector of the Swedish Army Signal Troops (Signalinspektören). From 1966 to 1991, the signal and engineer troops had a joint branch inspector; the Inspector of the Swedish Army Engineer Corps and Signal Corps (Ingenjörinspektör- och Signalinspektören). (Note: Also called the Director of Swedish Army Engineers and Signals.) From 1991, the two branches received an inspector each, and the title of the signal troops was shortened to the Signal Inspector. In connection with the decommissioning of Swedish Army Staff and Communication Center (Arméns lednings- och sambandscentrum), the position of Signal Inspector disappeared.

- 1942–1948: Colonel Gottfried Hain
- 1948–1954: Colonel Åke Sundberg
- 1954–1955: Colonel Hilding Kring
- 1955–1959: Colonel Fale Burman
- 1959–1962: Colonel Gunnar af Klintberg
- 1962–1966: Colonel Bengt Uller
- 1966–1967: Colonel Gunnar Smedmark
- 1967–1967: Colonel Harald Smith (acting)
- 1968–1969: Colonel Harald Smith
- 1969–1975: Colonel Åke Bernström
- 1975–1982: Senior colonel Kåre Svanfeldt
- 1982–1986: Senior colonel Owe Dahl
- 1986–1991: Senior colonel Bertil Lövdahl
- 1992–1998: Senior colonel Lars Dicander

== See also ==
- Swedish Armoured Troops
- Swedish Engineer Troops
- Swedish Army Service Troops
- List of Swedish signal regiments
