= List of Swedish signal regiments =

This is a list of Swedish signal regiments, battalions, corps and companies of the Swedish Army Signal Troops that have existed in the Swedish Army. They are listed in three ways, first by the actual units that have existed, then by the various names these units have had, and last by the various designations these units have had.

== By unit ==
- S 1 Signalregementet (1937–1957)
- S 1 B Signalkompaniet i Boden (1937–1954)
- S 1 K Signalkompaniet i Kristianstad (1942–1950)
- S 1 Sk Signalkompaniet i Skövde (1942–1961)
- S 1 Upplands signalregemente (1957–1974)
- S 1 Upplands regemente (1974–2006)
- S 2 Göta signalkår (1961–1962)
- S 2 Göta signalregemente (1962–1984)
- s 2 Göta signalbataljon (1984–1997) (part of Life Regiment Hussars (K 3)
- S 3 Signalbataljonen i Boden (1954–1957)
- S 3 Norrlands signalbataljon (1957–1987)
- S 3 Norrlands signalregemente (1987–1994)
- S 3 Norrlands signalkår (1994–2000)
- Signbat/I 19 Norrland Signal Battalion (2000–2005) (part of Norrbotten Regiment (I 19)
- LedR Ledningsregementet (2007– )

== By name ==
- Bodens signalkompani
- Fälttelegrafkåren
- Fälttelegrafkårens detachment i Boden
- Göta signalbataljon
- Göta signalkår
- Göta signalregemente
- Ledningsregementet
- Norrlands signalbataljon
- Norrlands signalkår
- Norrlands signalregemente
- Signalbataljonen i Boden
- Signalbataljonen i Skövde
- Signalregementet
- Signalregementets kompani i Boden
- Signalregementets kompani i Skövde
- Upplands signalregemente
- Upplands regemente
- Upplands signalregementes kompani i Skövde

== See also ==
- List of Swedish regiments
- Military district (Sweden)
- List of Swedish defence districts
