= Uppland Regiment =

Coordinates: 59°50′27″N 17°38′54″E

Royal Uppland Regiment
- Kungliga Upplands regemente
- Active: 1626–1709; 1709–1957
- Country: Sweden
- Allegiance: Swedish Armed Forces
- Branch: Swedish Army
- Type: Infantry
- Size: Regiment
- Part of: 4th Military District (1833–1888); 5th Military District (1888–1893); 5th Army Division (1893–1901); V Army Division (1902–1927); Eastern Army Division (1928–1936); IV Army Division (1937–1942); IV Military District (1942–1957)
- Garrison/HQ: Uppsala
- Colors: Red and yellow
- March: "Utgångsmarsch" (Bergström) (Note: The march was adopted around 1890, established in 1953 by Army Order 33/1953. The march was used by Uppland Signal Regiment from 1976 to 2006.)
- Battle honours: Varberg (1565), Narva (1581), Lützen (1632), Warsaw (1656), Fredriksodde (1657), March Across the Belts (1658), Rügen (1678), Düna (1701), Kliszow (1702), Holovczyn (1708), Helsingborg (1710), Svensksund (1790)

The Royal Uppland Regiment (Swedish: Kungliga Upplands regemente), designation I 8, was a Swedish Army infantry regiment that traced its origins back to the 16th century. It was disbanded in 1957. The regiment's soldiers were originally recruited from the province of Uppland, and it was later garrisoned there.

== History ==
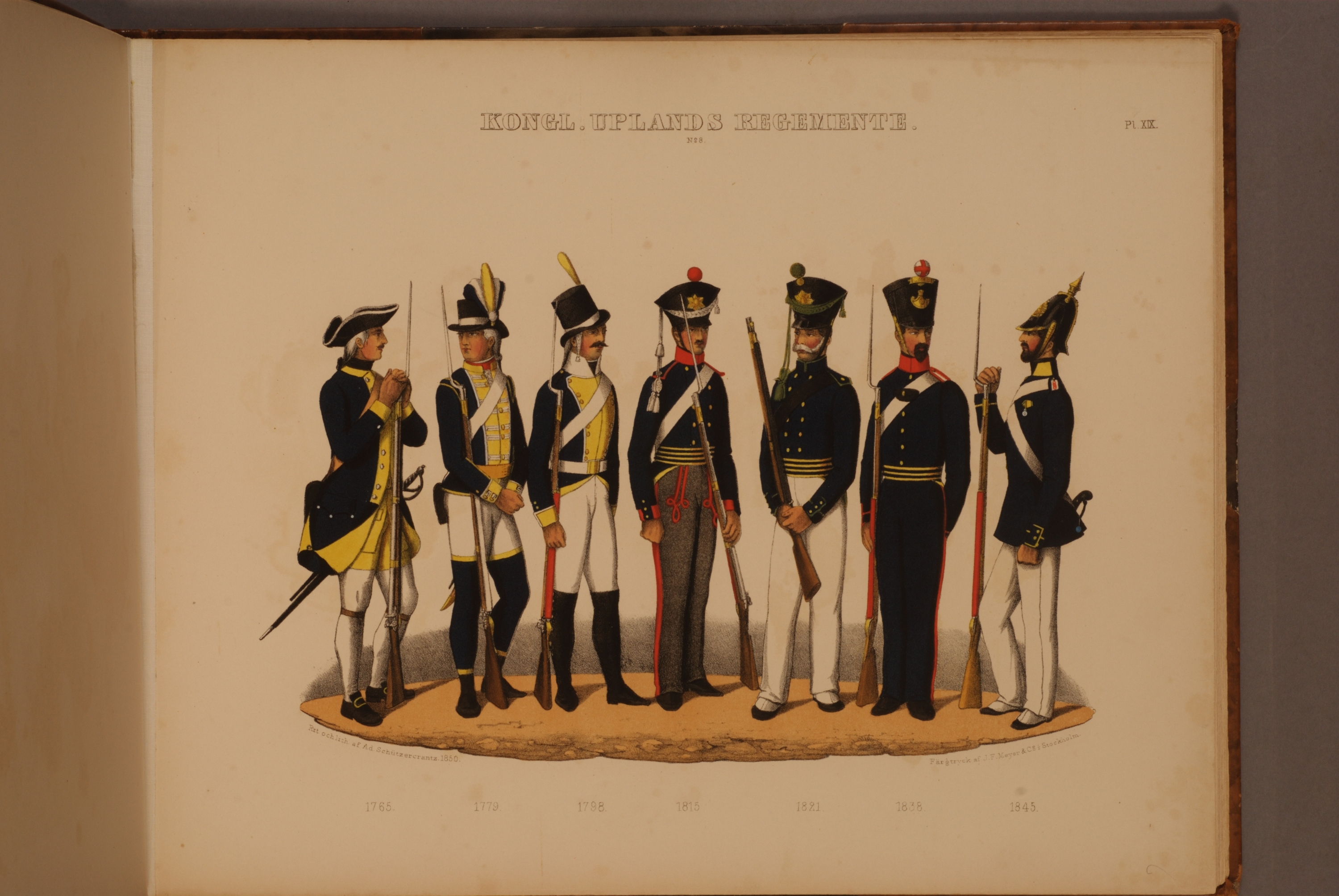
Uniforms of the regiment, 1765-1845. Lithography by Adolf Ulrik Schützercrantz

The regiment has its origins in fänikor (companies) raised in Uppland in the 1550s and 1560s. In 1617, these units—along with fänikor from the nearby provinces of Dalarna and Västmanland—were organised by Gustav II Adolf into Upplands storregemente, of which eight of the total 24 companies were recruited in Uppland. Upplands storregemente consisted of three field regiments, of which Uppland Regiment was one. Sometime around 1623, the grand regiment was permanently split into 3 smaller regiments, of which Uppland Regiment was one.

The regiment was officially raised in 1626 although it had existed since 1623. Upplands regemente was one of the original 20 Swedish infantry regiments mentioned in the Swedish constitution of 1634. The regiment's first commander was Nils Brahe. It was allotted in 1682 as one of the first regiments to be so.

The regiment was given the designation I 8 (8th Infantry Regiment) in a general order in 1816. Uppland Regiment was renamed Uppland Infantry Regiment in 1904 to distinguish it from Uppland Artillery Regiment. The regiment was garrisoned in Uppsala from 1912. In 1928, the regiment regained its old name. The regiment was disbanded in 1957. The signal regiment Uppland Signal Regiment was renamed to Uppland Regiment in 1974, but does not trace its origins from the original regiment, even though the victory names have been transferred to it.

== Campaigns ==
- ?

== Organisation ==
1682(?)

- Livkompaniet
- Överstelöjtnantens kompani
- Majorens kompani
- Hundra härads kompani
- Rasbo kompani
- Sigtuna kompani
- Hagunda kompani
- Bälings kompani

18??

- Livkompanie
- Rasbo kompani
- Olands kompani
- Uppsala kompani
- Hundra Härads kompani
- Sigtuna kompani
- Hagunda kompani
- Enköpings kompani

== Heraldry and traditions ==
=== Colours, standards and guidons ===
The regiment has carried a number of colour over the years. On 3 July 1855, His Majesty the King Oscar I presented a new colour to the regiment's two battalions. The two colours only had two battle honours, Lützen and Kliszow. On 27 September 1955, His Majesty the King Gustaf VI Adolf presented a colour, which replaced the 1855 colours. The new colour had 12 battle honours. The colour was on 30 March 1957 handed over to the Uppland Signal Regiment, which carried it alongside its original colour.

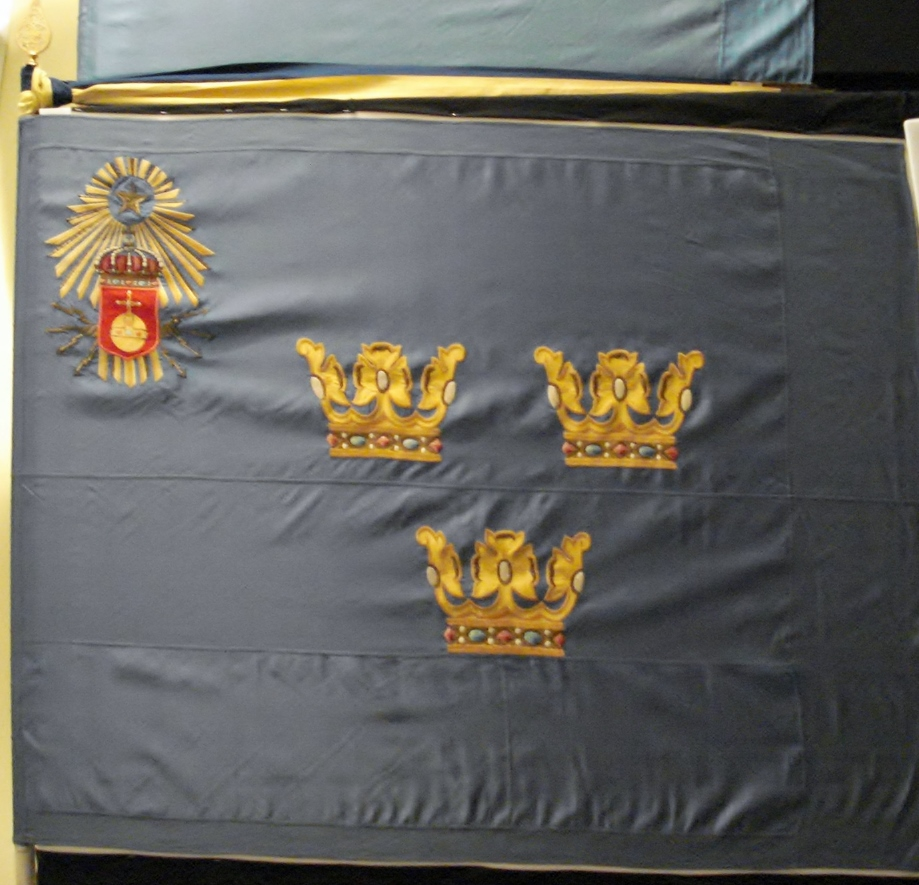
The 1935 colour. The provincial badge of Uppland was added in 1959 in the upper inner corner, where initially the lesser coat of arms of Sweden was.

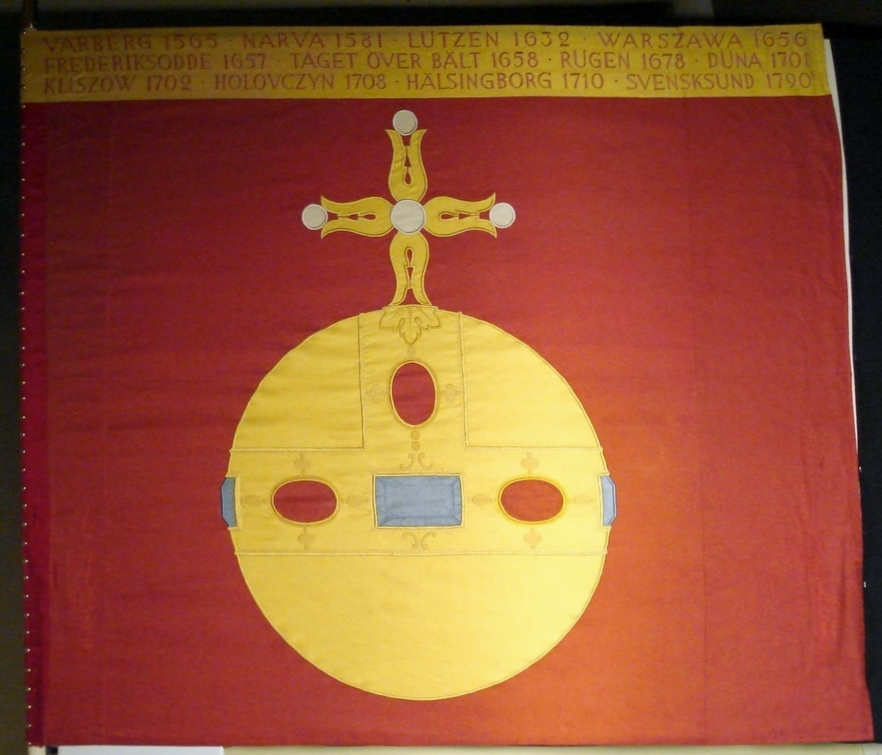
The 1955 colour

=== Coat of arms ===
The coat of the arms of the Uppland Regiment (I 8). It was used by Uppland Group (Upplandsgruppen) 2000–2005 and by the Uppland and Västmanland Group (Upplands- och Västmanlandsgruppen) since 2005. Blazon: "Gules, the provincial badge of Uppland, an orb or, banded and ensigned with a cross-crosslet. The shield surmounted two swords in saltire or".

=== Medals ===
In 1934, the Kungl. Upplands regementes (I 8) förtjänstmedalj ("Royal Uppland Regiment (I 8) Medal of Merit") in gold, silver and bronze (UpplregGM/UpplregSM/UpplregBM) were established.

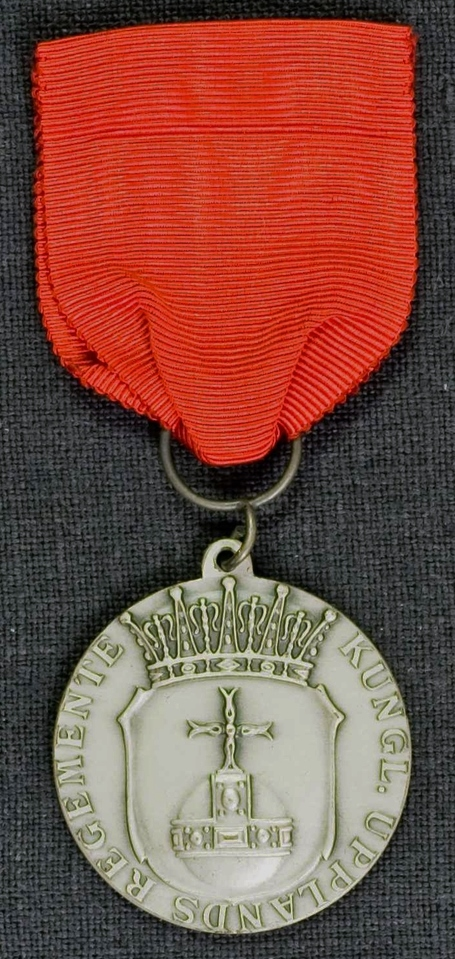
Royal Uppland Regiment Medal of Merit from 1938.

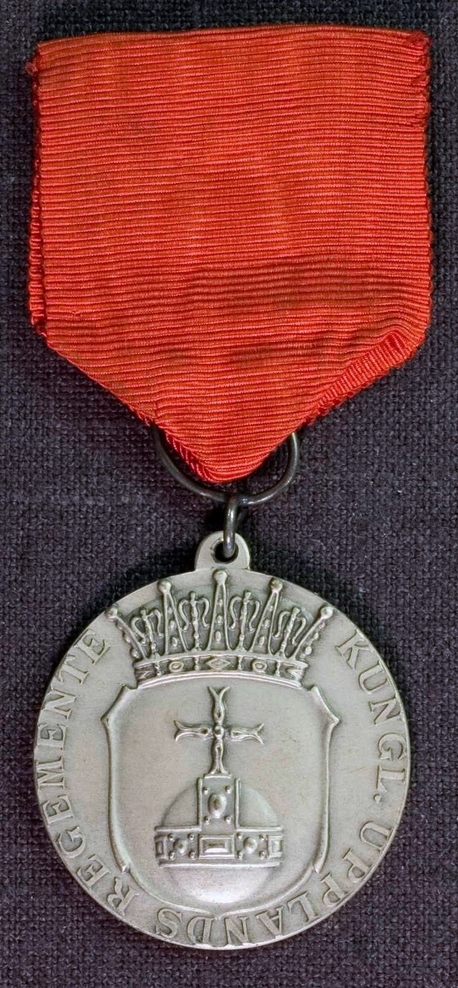
Royal Uppland Regiment Medal of Merit from 1938.

=== Heritage ===
Following the decision of the Riksdag on the disbandment of the regiment, a ceremony was held on 10 March 1957. After the regiment was disbanded, the regiment's traditions were continued Uppland Signal Regiment, which also assumed the name of Uppland Regiment. From 2007, the traditions of the regiment were passed on to the Command and Control Regiment. From 1 July 2013, the regimental traditions will be continued by the Uppland Battalion, part of the Uppland and Västmanland Group (Upplands- och Västmanlandsgruppen).

== Commanding officers ==
Regimental commander active from 1698 to 1957.

- 1698–1705: O W Löwe(n)
- 1705–1706: J V von Daldorff
- 1706–1709: G F de Frietzcyk
- 1709–1709: G Stiernhöök
- 1709–1710: J Braun
- 1710–1710: C Ekeblad
- 1710–1711: G Ribbing
- 1711–1721: G W Fleetwood
- 1721–1723: G Oxenstierna
- 1723–1728: O J Koskull
- 1728–1730: O W Staël von Holstein
- 1730–1737: O M Wolffelt
- 1737–1741: W L Taube
- 1741–1748: C M de Laval
- 1748–1757: Fredrik Henrik Sparre
- 1757–1759: C J Mörner
- 1759–1772: T G Rudbeck
- 1772–1772: Per Scheffer
- 1772–1788: Fabian Casimir Wrede
- 1788–1791: Fabian Wrede
- 1791–1794: Adam Ludvig Lewenhaupt
- 1794–1810: Adolf Ludvig von Schwerin
- 1810–1816: Gustaf Olof Lagerbring
- 1816–1825: C A Hård
- 1825–1837: S D Sparre
- 1837–1854: C L Daevel
- 1854–1860: A L Rappe
- 1860–1862: A F Z Reuterskiöld
- 1862–1865: J A Sundmark
- 1865–1881: Otto Mauritz von Knorring
- 1881–1888: S G R von Bahr
- 1888–1899: L W Stiernstedt
- 1899–1905: Bengt Erland Eberhard von Hofsten
- 1905–1911: Curt Johan Elof Rosenblad
- 1911–1923: Claës Sundin
- 1923–1928: Bo Boustedt
- 1928–1935: Carl Schöning
- 1935–1940: Helmer Bratt
- 1940–1942: Sven Ryman
- 1942–1950: Olle Norman
- 1950–1957: Carl Axel Grewell

== Names, designations and locations ==
Name	Translation	From		To
Kungl. Upplands regemente	Royal Uppland Regiment	1626-??-??	–	1709-07-01
Kungl. Upplands regemente	Royal Uppland Regiment	1709-??-??	–	1904-12-07
Kungl. Upplands infanteriregemente	Royal Uppland Infantry Regiment	1904-12-08	–	1927-12-31
Kungl. Upplands regemente	Royal Uppland Regiment	1928-01-01	–	1957-03-31
Avvecklingsorganisation	Decommissioning Organisation	1957-04-01	–	1957-09-30
Designation		From		To
No. 8		1816-10-01	–	1914-09-30
I 8		1914-10-01	–	1957-03-31
Locations		From		To
Kronoparken		1600s	–	1912-09-09
Örsundsbro		1680-??-??	–	1912-09-09
Polacksbacken		1681-??-??	–	1912-09-09
Söderby/Uppsala-Näs		1881-??-??	–	1912-09-09
Uppsala Garrison		1912-09-10	–	1957-09-30

== See also ==
- List of Swedish infantry regiments
