= Command and Control Regiment (Sweden) =

Coordinates: 59°38′51″N 17°06′05″E

- Ledningsregementet
- Active: 2007–present
- Country: Sweden
- Allegiance: Swedish Armed Forces
- Branch: Swedish Army
- Type: Joint
- Size: Regiment
- Part of: Swedish Armed Forces Headquarters
- Garrison/HQ: Enköping
- Mottos: Nihil Impossibilis Est (Note: The motto, originally NIHIL EST IMPOSSIBILIS, was marked around 1920 by the commander of the Field Telegraph Corps, Colonel Karl Amundson.) ("Nothing is impossibile")
- Colors: Blue
- March: "I täten" (Sam Rydberg)

Commanders
- Current commander: COL Rickard Karlsson-Lindquist

Insignia
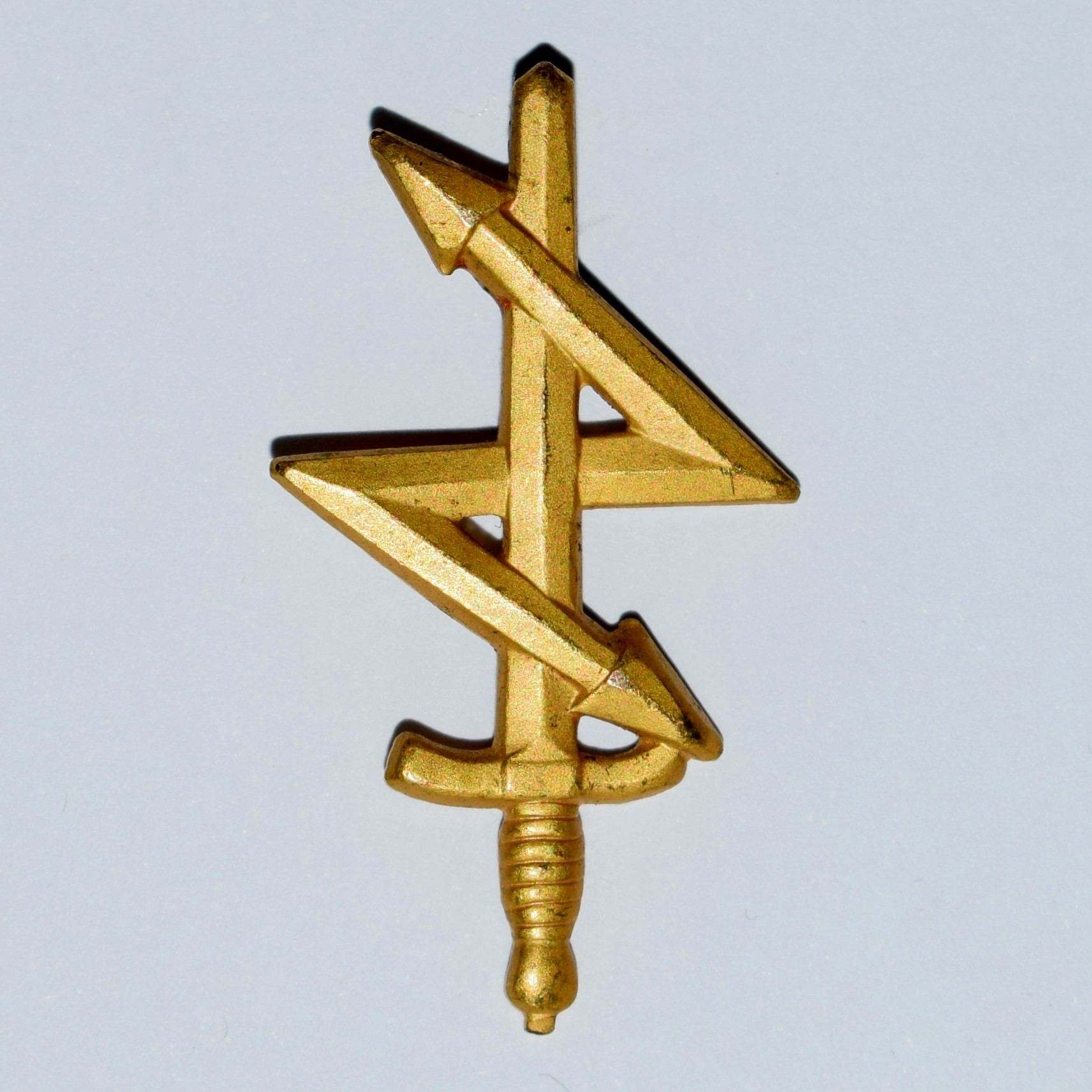
- Branch insignia

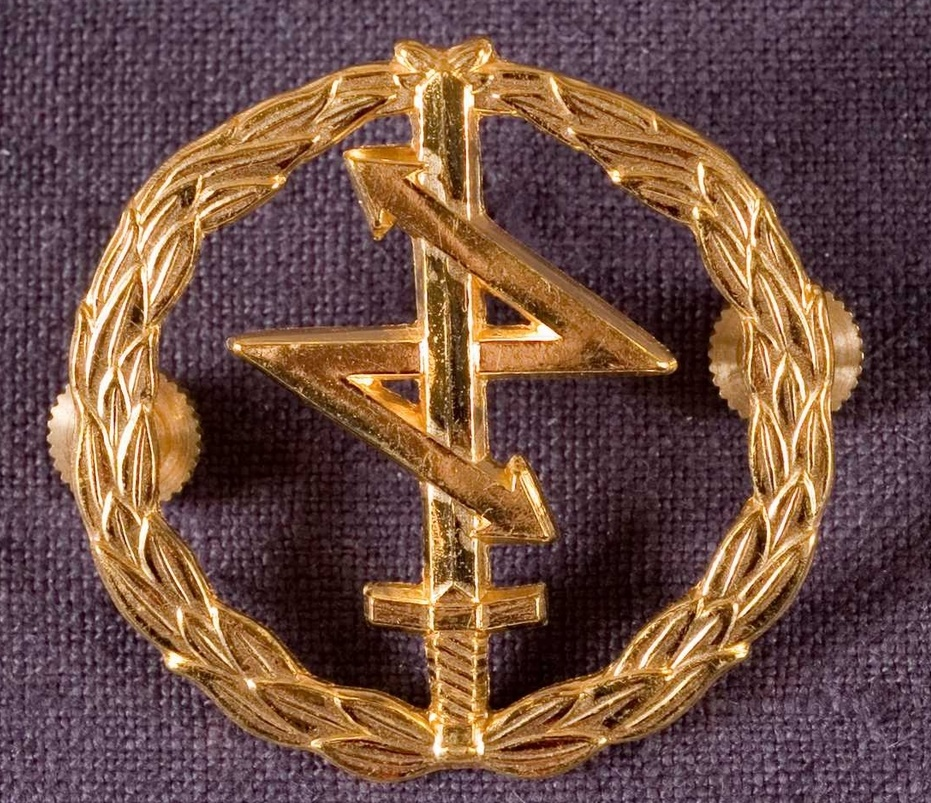
- Cap badge

The Command and Control Regiment (Swedish: Ledningsregementet, LedR) is the Swedish Armed Forces command and control and army electronic warfare unit raised in 2007. Its lineage traces back to the 19th century. The regiment is currently garrisoned in Enköping, Uppland.

== History ==
The regiment has its origins in the field signal (later telegraphy) company raised in 1871. This unit then evolved and finally became Uppland Regiment in 1974. That regiment was disbanded in 2006 but was replaced by the Command and Control Regiment, which took part the role that the Uppland Regiment previously had. The regiment was commanded by Colonel Lena Hallin, the first female regimental commander in Swedish history, until January 2011. The current regimental commander is Colonel Per Nilsson.

== Organisation ==
Current organisation of the regiment is:

- Regimental Headquarters, at Enköping
- Management Location Battalion (Ledingsplatsbataljonen)
  - 52nd Information Platoon (52. Infopluton)
  - Combat Camera Platoon (Combat Camera Pluton)
  - 51st Interpreting Platoon (51. Tolkpluton)
- Liaison Battalion (Sambandsbataljonen)
- Electronic Warfare Battalion (Telekrigbataljonen)
- Tactical Psychological Operations Team (Taktiskt Psykologiska Operationer Team)
- Electronic Warfare Support Unit, in Stockholm (Telekrigstödenheten)
  - Telecommunications Sub-Division (Telekrig Underavdelningarna)
  - Tactics and Technology Development Sub-Division (Taktik och Teknikutveckling Underavdelningarna)
  - Naval Underwater Sensor Analysis Centre Sub-Division (Marinens Undervattenssensoranalyscentral Underavdelningarna)
- Armed Forces Meteorological and Oceanographic Centres (Försvarsmaktens Meteorologiska Och Oceanografiska Centrum)
  - Production Department (Produktionsavdelningen)
  - Education Department (Utbildningsavdelningen)
  - Development Department (Utvecklingsavdelningen)
  - Systems Tasks Department (Systemavdelningen)
- Lead Combat School (Ledningsstridsskolan)
  - Staff Department (Stabsavdelningen)
  - Division of Services (Tjänstegrensavdelningen)
  - Development Department (Utvecklingsavdelningen)
  - Education Department (Utblindningsavdelningen)
  - Swedish Armed Forces' Signal Protection School (Totalförsvarets Signalskyddsskola)
  - Training Department (Träningsavdelningen)
  - Technology and Support Department (Teknik och Stödavdelningen)
- Technology and Maintenance Office TVK Ledsyst (Teknik och Vidmakthållandekonto r TVK Ledsyst)

== Heraldry and traditions ==
=== Colours, standards and guidons ===
The Command and Control Regiment was raised on 1 January 2007 and its colour was presented by His Majesty the King Command and Control Regiment on 4 June 2009. The colour is based on the coat of arms, but also links to the historical legacy of the Command and Control Regiment, from the previous signal regiments.

=== Heritage ===
The Command and Control Regiment continues the traditions from Uppland Regiment (I 8), Uppland Regiment (S 1), Göta Signal Corps (S 2), Norrland Signal Corps (S 3), Södermanland Regiment (P 10), Västmanland Regiment (Fo 48). In addition, the regiment continues the memory of the Göta Life Guards (P 1).

=== Medals ===
In 2007, the Ledningsregementets förtjänstmedalj ("Command and Control Regiment Medal of Merit") in gold (LedRGM) and silver (LedRSM) was established.

Ribbon bar of the Command and Control Regiment Medal of Merit

== Commanding officers ==
- 2007–2010: Lena Hallin
- 2011–2014: Thomas Nilsson
- 2014–2014: Håkan Petersson (acting)
- 2014–2015: Mikael Åkerström
- 2016–2020: Mattias Hanson
- 2020–2022: Johan Axelsson
- 1 August – 30 September 2022: Colonel Per Nilsson (acting)
- 1 October 2022 – 30 April 2026: Colonel Per Nilsson
- 28 April 2026 - present: Colonel Rickard Karlsson-Lindquist

== Names, designations and locations ==
Name	Translation	From		To
Ledningsregementet	Command and Control Regiment	2007-01-01	–	
Designation		From		To
LedR		2007-01-01	–	
Location		From		To
Enköping Garrison		2007-01-01	–	

== See also ==
- List of Swedish signal regiments
