= Swedish Army Signal School =

- Arméns signalskola
- Active: 1942–1965
- Country: Sweden
- Allegiance: Swedish Armed Forces
- Branch: Swedish Army
- Type: Defence training school
- Garrison/HQ: Uppsala

Insignia
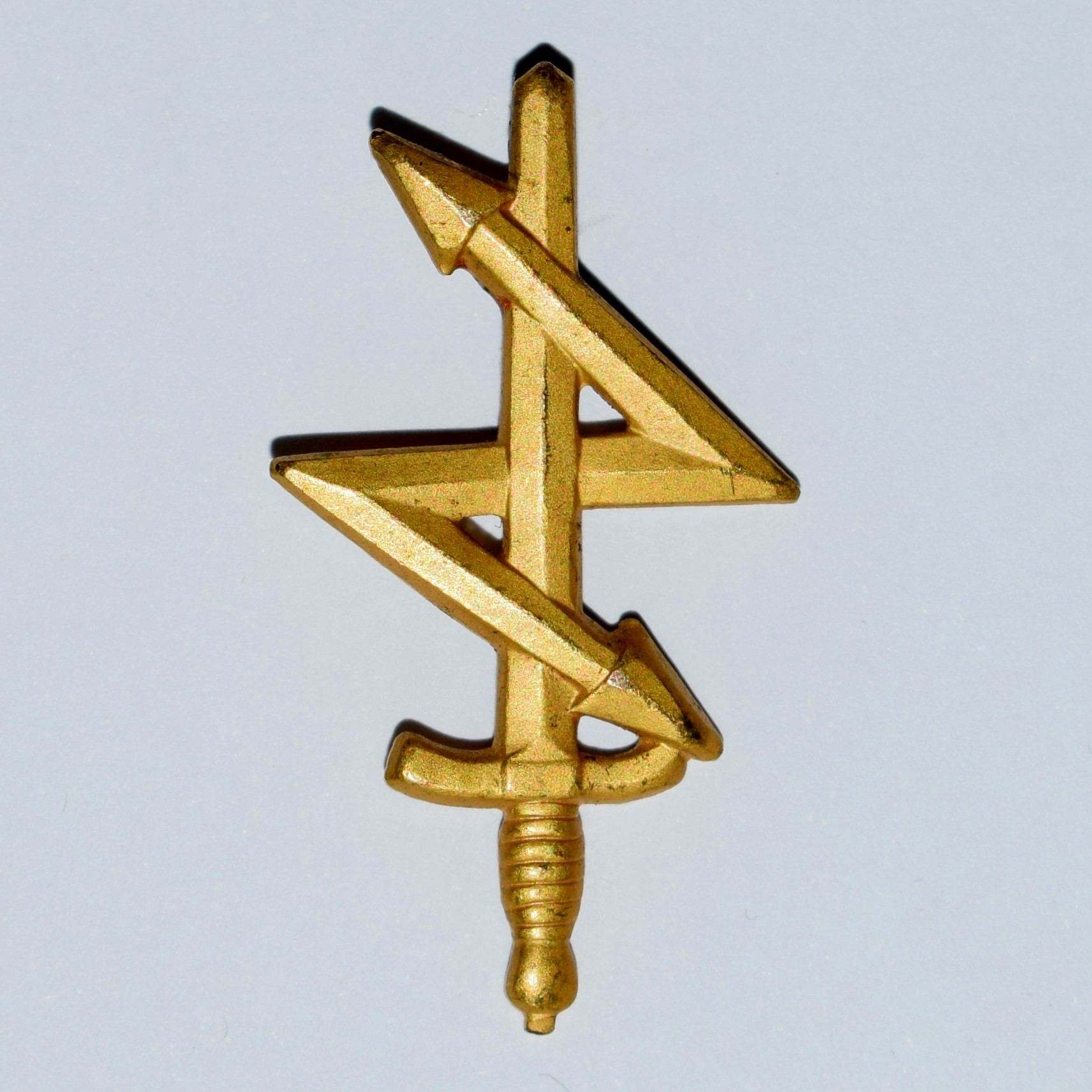
- Branch insignia m/1960

The Swedish Army Signal School (Swedish: Arméns signalskola, SignS) was established in 1942 and had the task of training personnel from the Swedish Army Signal Troops in terms of staff and troop signal unit technology, training methodology and tactical use. The unit was amalgamated into the Swedish Army School of Staff Work and Communications in 1965.

== History ==
The Swedish Army Signal School was established in 1942 in Frösunda, Solna, moved in 1945 to Marieberg in Stockholm and in 1958 to Uppsala. In 1960, the Swedish School of Communication Security (Signalskyddskolan) was attached to the school. The school's tasks were to further train officers and technical personnel within the Swedish Army Signal Troops, to train other permanently employed officers and conscripts in military communications and in the maintenance and repair of signal equipment and to be responsible for communication security training for the Swedish Total Defence. The school ceased in 1965 and was reorganized into the Swedish Army School of Staff Work and Communications (Arméns stabs- och sambandsskola, StabSbS).

== Commanding officers ==
- 1942–1945: Colonel Åke Sundberg
- 1945–1953: Colonel Gösta Runmark
- 1954–1963: Colonel Ivar Syberg
- 1963–1965: Colonel Bertil Hedberg
