= Norrland Signal Battalion =

- Norrlands signalbataljon
- Active: 1954–2004
- Country: Sweden
- Allegiance: Swedish Armed Forces
- Branch: Swedish Army
- Type: Signal
- Size: Battalion
- Part of: Signal Regiment (1937–1954); VI Military District (1954–1966); Upper Norrland Military District (1966–1993); Northern Military District (1993–2000); Norrbotten Regiment (2000–2004)
- Garrison/HQ: Boden
- Motto: Steget före ("One step ahead")
- Colors: Green, blue and yellow
- March: "I gevär" (Grundström) (Note: The march was established in 1958 by Army Order 424/1958, as well as for the Signal Battalion on 27 November 2002 by TFG 020006.)

Insignia
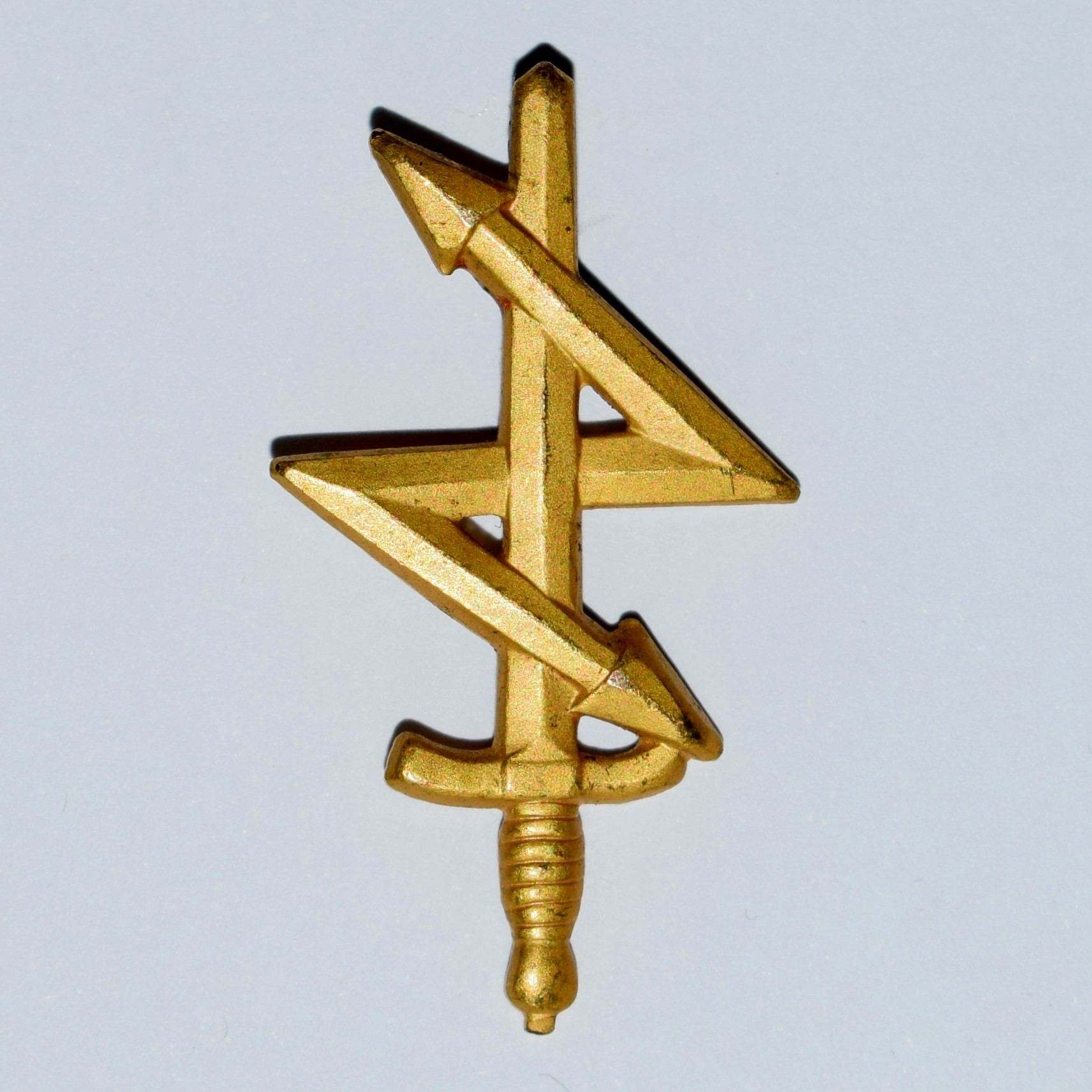
- Branch insignia

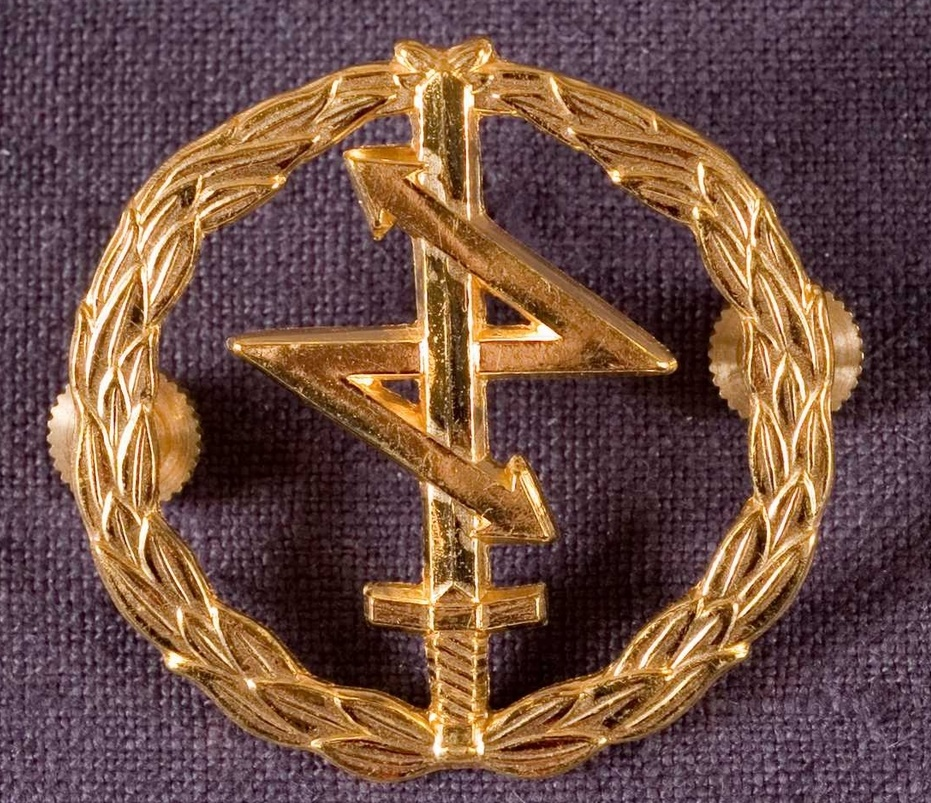
- Cap badge

The Norrland Signal Battalion (Swedish: Norrlands signalbataljon), designated Signbat/I 19, originally Norrland Signal Corps (Swedish: Norrlands signalkår), designated S 3, was a Swedish Army signal unit, one of the few new formations raised in the 20th century. It was disbanded in 2005. The unit was garrisoned in Norrbotten.

== History ==
The unit has its origins in a 1915 detached company, Field Telegraph Corps' Detachment in Boden, of the Field Telegraph Corps that was garrisoned in Boden. The company gained the designation Ing 3 det (3rd Engineer Regiment, detachment). The detachment was incorporated into Boden Engineer Corps in 1925, but was split off and formed Boden Signal Company with designation S 1 B in 1937.

The company was in 1954 upgraded to a separate battalion, and gained the designation S 3 (3rd Signal Regiment) in 1955. The battalion was renamed Norrland Signal Battalion soon after, and was upgraded to a regiment with the name Norrland Signal Regiment in 1987 but downgraded to a battalion-size unit again in 1994. In 2000, the battalion became one of five battalions in Norrbotten Regiment, regaining its old name, but not the designation S 3 it originally had, even though it was still in common use. The battalion was disbanded in 2005.

== Campaigns ==
- None

== Organisation ==
- ?

== Heraldry and traditions ==
=== Colours, standards and guidons ===
The unit presents one colour. It was presented to the then Royal Norrland Signals Battalion (S 3) in Boden by His Majesty the King Gustaf VI Adolf on 28 July 1961. It was used as regimental colour by S 3 until 1 July 2000. The colour may be used according to the decisions of CO I 19. The colour is drawn by Brita Grep and embroidered by hand in insertion technique by the company Libraria. Blazon: "On blue cloth in the centre the lesser coat of arms of Sweden, three yellow crowns placed two and one. In the first corner a mullet with a cluster of rays, all yellow. In the lower part of this placed upon a cluster of yellow bolts, the provincial coat of arms of Västerbotten; azure powdered with estoiles or, a reindeer at speed argent armed and langued gules. The shield ensigned with a royal crown proper."

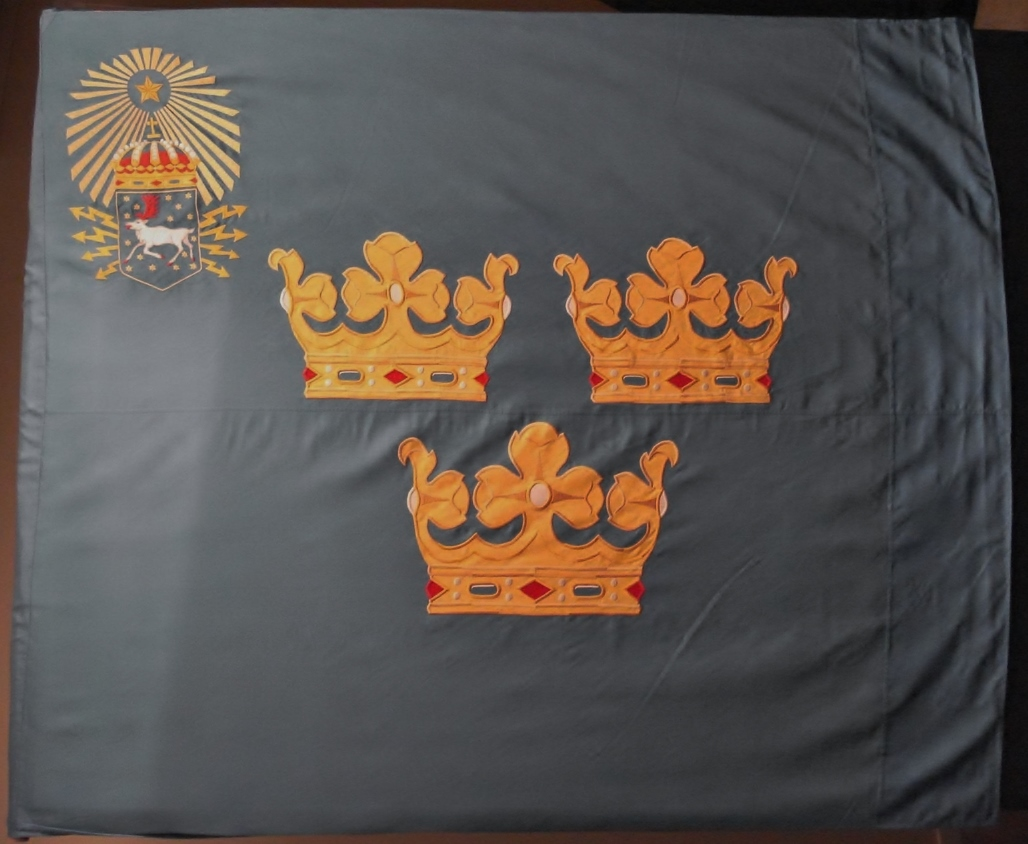
Colour of S 3, presented in 1968 by His Majesty the King Gustaf VI Adolf.

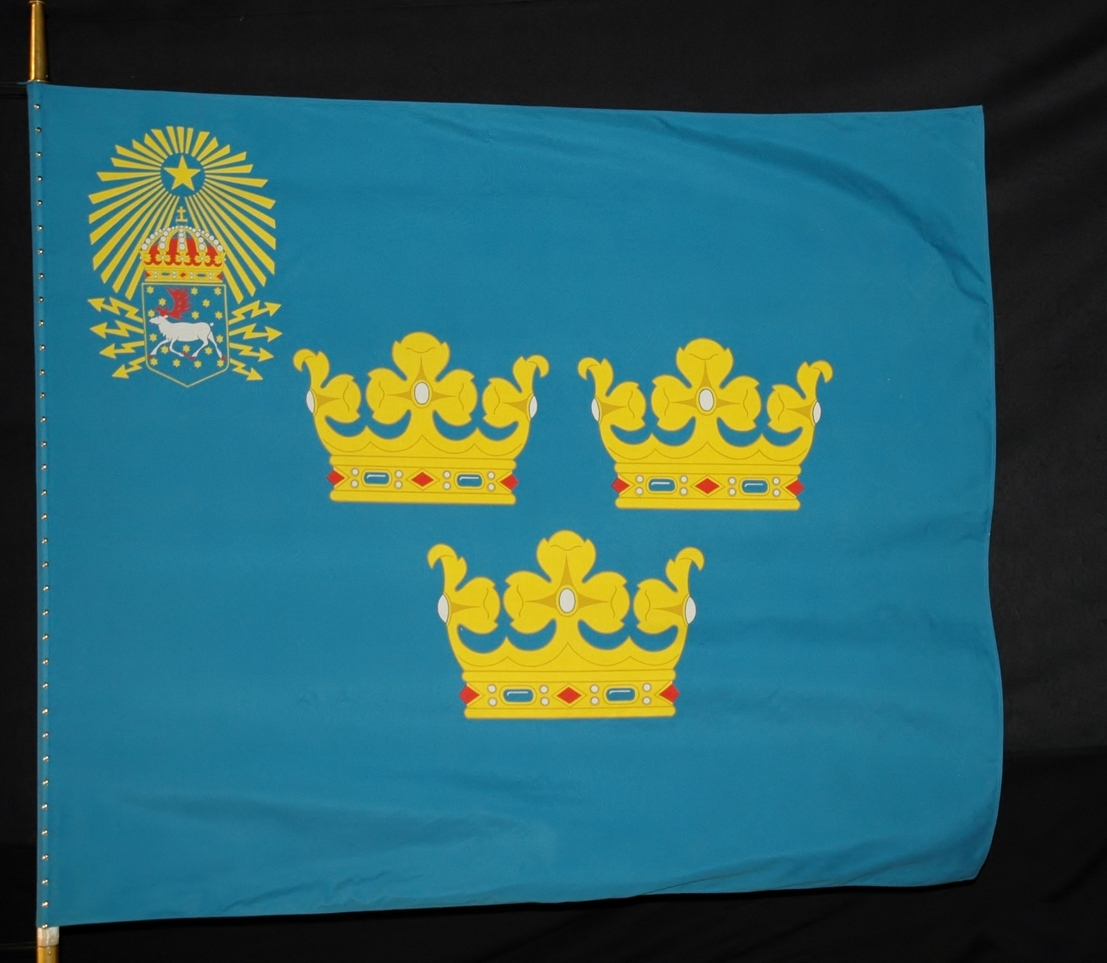
The 2001 colour which replaced the 1961 colour.

=== Coat of arms ===
The coat of the arms of the Norrland Signal Battalion (S 3) 1977–1987, the Norrland Signal Regiment (S 3) 1987–1994, the Norrland Signal Corps (S 3) 1994–2000 and the Norrland Signal Battalion (Signbat/I 19) 2000–2004. Blazon: "Azure, powdered with estoiles or, the provincial badge of Västerbotten, a reindeer courant argent, armed and langued gules. The shield surmounted a cluster of bolts, or".

=== Medals ===
In 1998, the Norrlands signalkårs förtjänstmedalj ("Norrland Signals Corps Medal of Merit") in silver (NorrlsignkSM) of the 8th size was established. This medal was from 2000 to 2004 named Norrlands signalbataljons (S 3) förtjänstmedalj ("Norrland Signals Battalion (S 3) Medal of Merit") (NorrlsignbatSM). The medal ribbon is of green moiré with a blue stripe on the middle followed on both sides by a yellow stripe.

In 2005, the Norrlands signalbataljons minnesmedalj ("Norrland Signals Battalion Commemorative Medal") in silver (NorrlsignbatMSM) of the 8th size was established. The medal ribbon is divided in blue, green, yellow, pale blue, yellow, green and blue moiré.

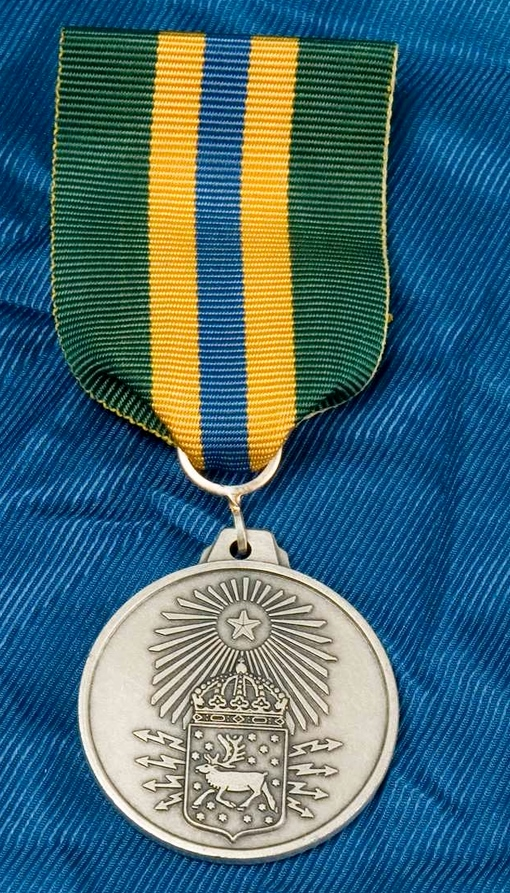
The Norrland Signals Corps Medal of Merit, later renamed the Norrland Signals Battalion (S 3) Medal of Merit

Ribbon bar of the medal of merit

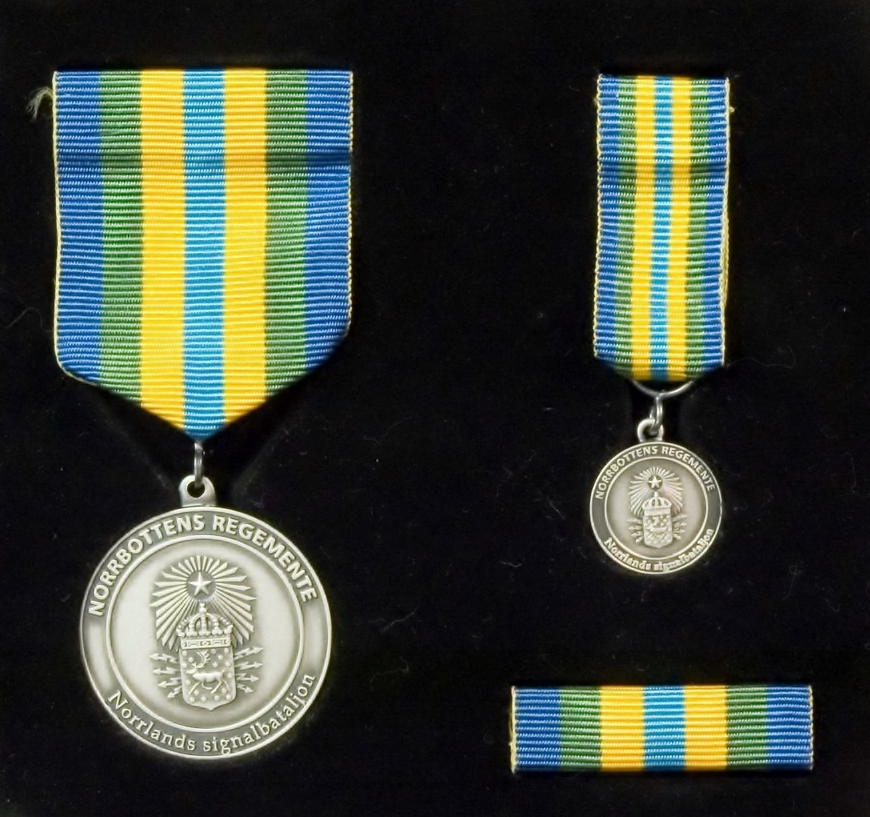
The Norrland Signals Battalion Commemorative Medal in silver; medal, miniature and ribbon bar

Ribbon bar of the commemorative medal

== Commanding officers ==
From 1954 to 1987 the commanding officer was called battalion commander and from 1987 to 1994 he was called regimental commander and from 1994 to 2000 he was called corps commander. From 2000 to 2004, the unit was an integral part of Norrbotten Regiment.

- 1954–1956: Gunnar Olof Friberg
- 1956–1960: Tage Ingemar Bratt
- 1960–1964: Nils Fredrik Schale
- 1964–1966: Karl Edvin Eriksson
- 1966–1971: Arne Risling
- 1971–1977: Kjell T:son Nerpin
- 1977–1979: Bror Oscar Nyström
- 1979–1980: Åke Bertil Gunnar Lövdahl
- 1981–1982: Bo Jonas Forsgren
- 1982–1987: Carl-Henrik Bengsston
- 1987–1987: Carl-Henrik Bengsston
- 1987–1990: Lennart Johansson
- 1990–1992: Hasse Kvint
- 1992–1996: Ulf Nordlander
- 1996–2000: Ola Hanson
- 2000–2001: Mats Blom
- 2001–2002: Dennis Gyllensporre
- 2002–2003: Anders Magnusson
- 2003–2004: Anders Josefsson
- 2004–2005: Dan Hagman

== Names, designations and locations ==
Name	Translation	From		To
Fälttelegrafkårens detachement i Boden	Field Telegraph Corps' Detachment in Boden	1915-01-01	–	1925-10-31
Bodens signalkompani	Boden Signal Company	1937-07-01	–	1942-12-03
Signalregementets kompani i Boden	Signal Regiment's Company in Boden	1942-12-04	–	1954-06-30
Signalbataljonen i Boden	Signal Battalion in Boden	1954-07-01	–	1957-03-31
Norrlands signalbataljon	Norrland Signal Battalion	1957-04-01	–	1987-06-30
Norrlands signalregemente	Norrland Signal Regiment	1987-07-01	–	1994-06-30
Norrlands signalkår	Norrland Signal Corps	1994-07-01	–	2000-06-30
Norrlands signalbataljon	Norrland Signal Battalion	2000-07-01	–	2005-06-30
Avvecklingsorganisation	Decommissioning Organisation	2005-01-01	–	2005-06-30
Designation		From		To
Ing 3 det		1915-01-01	–	1925-10-31
S 1 B		1937-07-01	–	1955-12-06
S 3		1955-12-07	–	2000-06-30
Signbat/I 19		2000-07-01	–	2005-06-30
Location		From		To
Boden Garrison		1915-01-01	–	1925-10-31
Boden Garrison		1937-07-01	–	2005-06-30

== See also ==
- List of Swedish signal regiments
