= Göta Signal Corps =

Former Swedish Army unit

- Göta signalkår
- Active: 1944–1997
- Country: Sweden
- Allegiance: Swedish Armed Forces
- Branch: Swedish Army
- Type: Signal
- Size: Corps
- Part of: Uppland Regiment (1944–1961); Western Military District (1961–1984); Life Regiment Hussars (1984–1997)
- Garrison/HQ: Karlsborg
- Mottos: Det omöjliga tar bara litet längre tid ("The impossible only takes a little longer time")
- Colors: Blue and white
- March: "Svensk militärmarsch" (Brodin) (Note: The march was established by Army Order 418/1962.)

Insignia
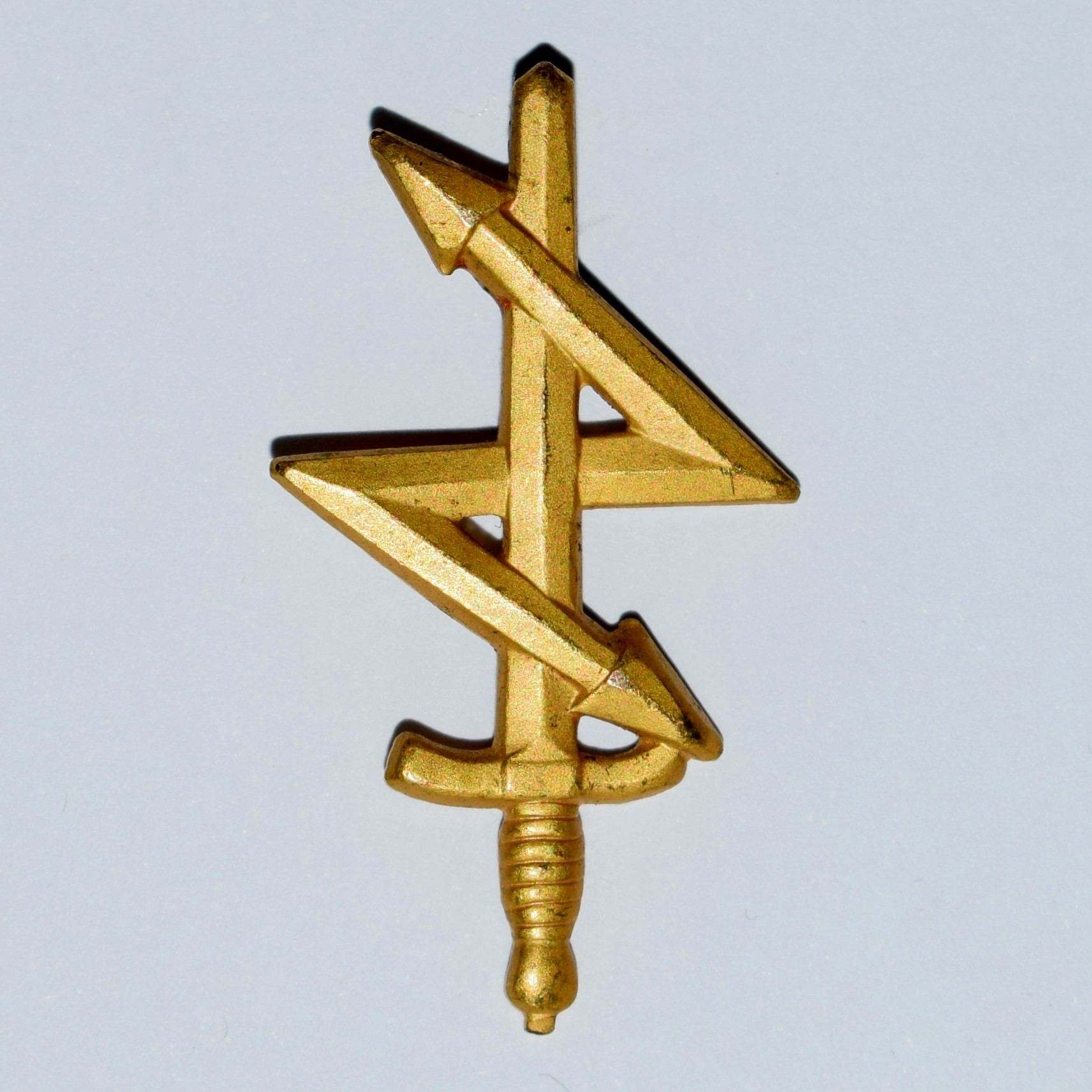
- Branch insignia

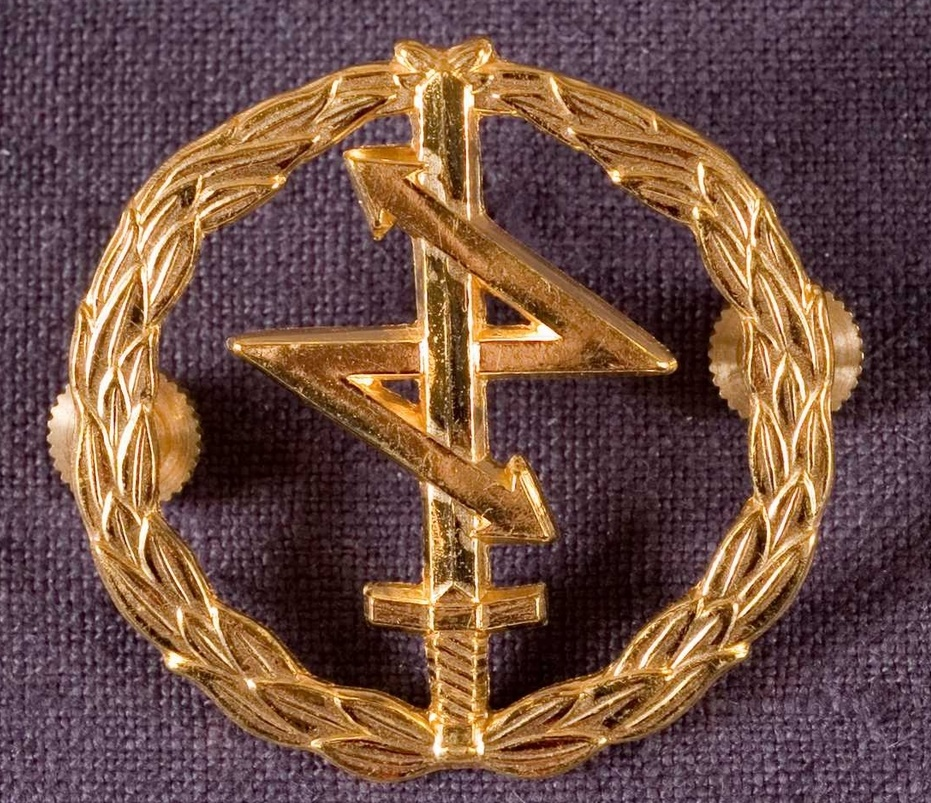
- Cap badge

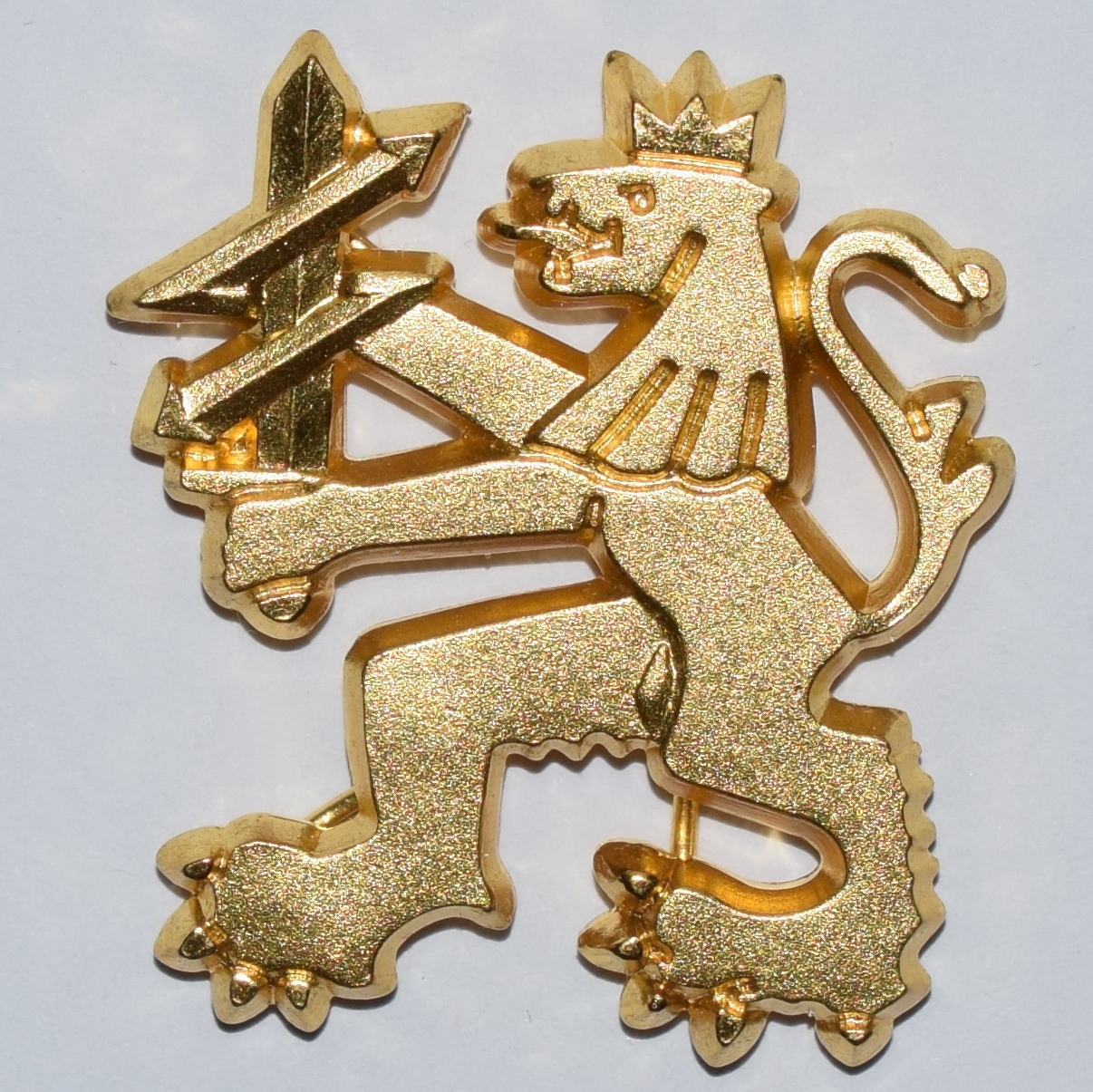
- Unit insignia

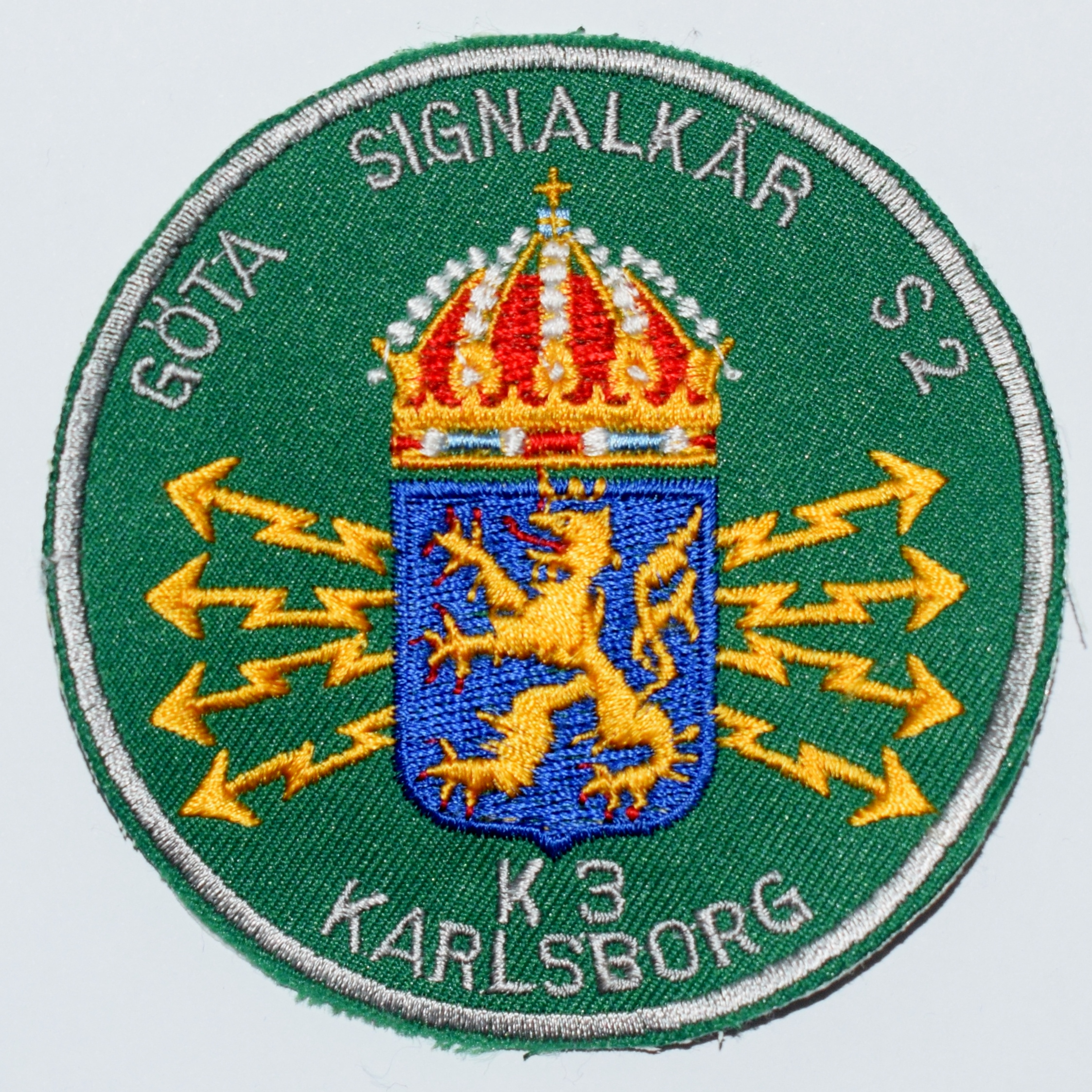
- Shoulder sleeve insignia

The Göta Signal Corps (Swedish: Göta signalkår), designations S 1 Sk and S 2, was a Swedish Army signal unit, one of the few new formations raised in the 20th century. It was disbanded in 1997. The unit was garrisoned in Västergötland.

== History ==
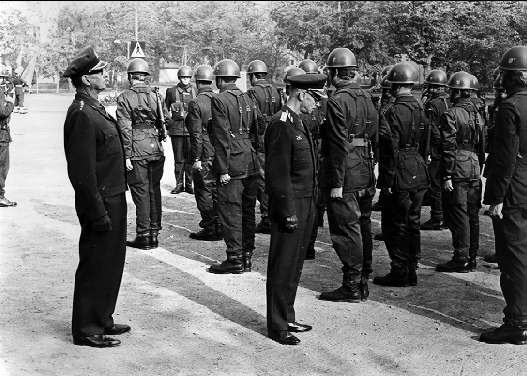
Line-up of Signal Troops at Göta Signal Regiment (S 2) in 1984.

The unit has its origins in a 1944 detached company, Signalregementets kompani i Skövde, of Signal Regiment that was garrisoned in Skövde. The company gained the designation S 1 Sk (1st Signal Regiment, Skövde detachment), and was in 1958 upgraded to a separate battalion, and gained the designation S 2.

The battalion was transferred to Karlsborg in 1961 and was renamed Royal Göta Signal Regiment in 1962 when it was upgraded to regimental size. The Swedish Army Paratroop School was attached to the regiment from 1961 until the regiment was disbanded in 1984. However one battalion of the regiment was kept as part of Life Regiment Hussars as Göta Signal Battalion until it was disbanded in 1997.

== Campaigns ==
- None

== Organisation ==
- ?

== Heraldry and traditions ==
=== Colours, standards and guidons ===
On 25 August 1962, His Majesty the King Gustaf VI Adolf presented a colour to the then Göta Signal Regiment. When Karlsborg Anti-Aircraft Regiment (Lv 1) was disbanded on 31 March 1961, its colour was transferred to Göta Signal Regiment, which carried it on certain occasions. On 1 July 1984, Göta Signal Regiment was amalgamated as a training battalion into the Life Regiment Hussars (K 3). The colour was then transferred to the Anti-Aircraft Combat School (Luftvärnsskjutskolan, LvSS) on 8 October 1984. Since 1 July 2000, the memory of Karlsborg Anti-Aircraft Regiment is maintained by the Air Defence Regiment (Lv 6).

On 30 April 1996, Supreme Commander, General Owe Wiktorin presented a new colour to Göta Signal Battalion at the Artillery Yard in Stockholm. It was drawn by Kristina Holmgård-Åkerberg and embroidered by machine in insertion technique by the company Libraria. It was used as battalion colour by S 2 until 1 January 1998. Blazon: "On green cloth in the centre a circular shield showing the coat of arms of the unit; azure, three wavy white bends sinister charged with a crowned double-tailed yellow lion rampant, armed and langued gules. The shield ensigned with a royal crown proper. In the first corner a mullet with a cluster of rays and in the second corner the insignia of the Swedish Army Signal Troops; an erect sword entwined with a bolt, all yellow".

=== Coat of arms ===
The coat of the arms of the Göta Signal Regiment (S 2) 1977–1994 and the Göta Signal Battalion (K 3/S 2) 1994–1997. Blazon: "Azure, the regimental badge, a double-tailed lion rampant or armed and langued gules. The shield surmounted a cluster of bolts, or".

== Commanding officers ==
- 1958–1960: Nils Fredrik Schale
- 1960–1970: Tage Ingemar Bratt
- 1970–1976: Karl Edvin Eriksson
- 1976–1980: Håkan Hallgren
- 1980–1982: Åke Bertil Gunnar Lövdahl
- 1982–1984: Kurt Olofsson
- 1984–1987: Per Granath
- 1987–1989: Nils Göran Anders Nilsson
- 1989–1991: Bengt-Åke Gelin
- 1991–1993: Christer Birger Levin
- 1993–1995: Christer Carl Einar Ejnarsson
- 1995–1997: Per Jörgen Ivhammar

== Names, designations and locations ==
Name	Translation	From		To
Kungl Signalregementets kompani i Skövde	Royal Signal Regiment's Company in Skövde	1944-04-01	–	1957-03-31
Kungl Upplands signalregementes kompani i Skövde	Royal Uppland Signal Regiment's Company in Skövde	1957-04-01	–	1958-06-30
Kungl Signalbataljonen i Skövde	Royal Signal Battalion in Skövde	1958-07-01	–	1961-03-31
Kungl Göta signalkår	Royal Göta Signal Corps	1961-04-01	–	1962-06-30
Kungl Göta signalregemente	Royal Göta Signal Regiment	1962-07-01	–	1974-12-31
Göta signalregemente	Göta Signal Regiment	1975-01-01	–	1984-06-30
Göta signalbataljon	Göta Signal Battalion	1984-07-01	–	1994-06-30
Göta signalkår	Göta Signal Corps	1994-07-01	–	1997-12-31
Designation		From		To
S 1 Sk		1944-04-01	–	1958-06-30
S 2		1958-07-01	–	1984-06-30
K 3/S 2		1984-07-01	–	1997-12-31
Location		From		To
Skövde garrison		1944-04-01	–	1961-03-31
Karlsborg Garrison		1961-04-01	–	1997-12-31

== See also ==
- List of Swedish signal regiments
