= Enköping =

Place in Uppland, Sweden

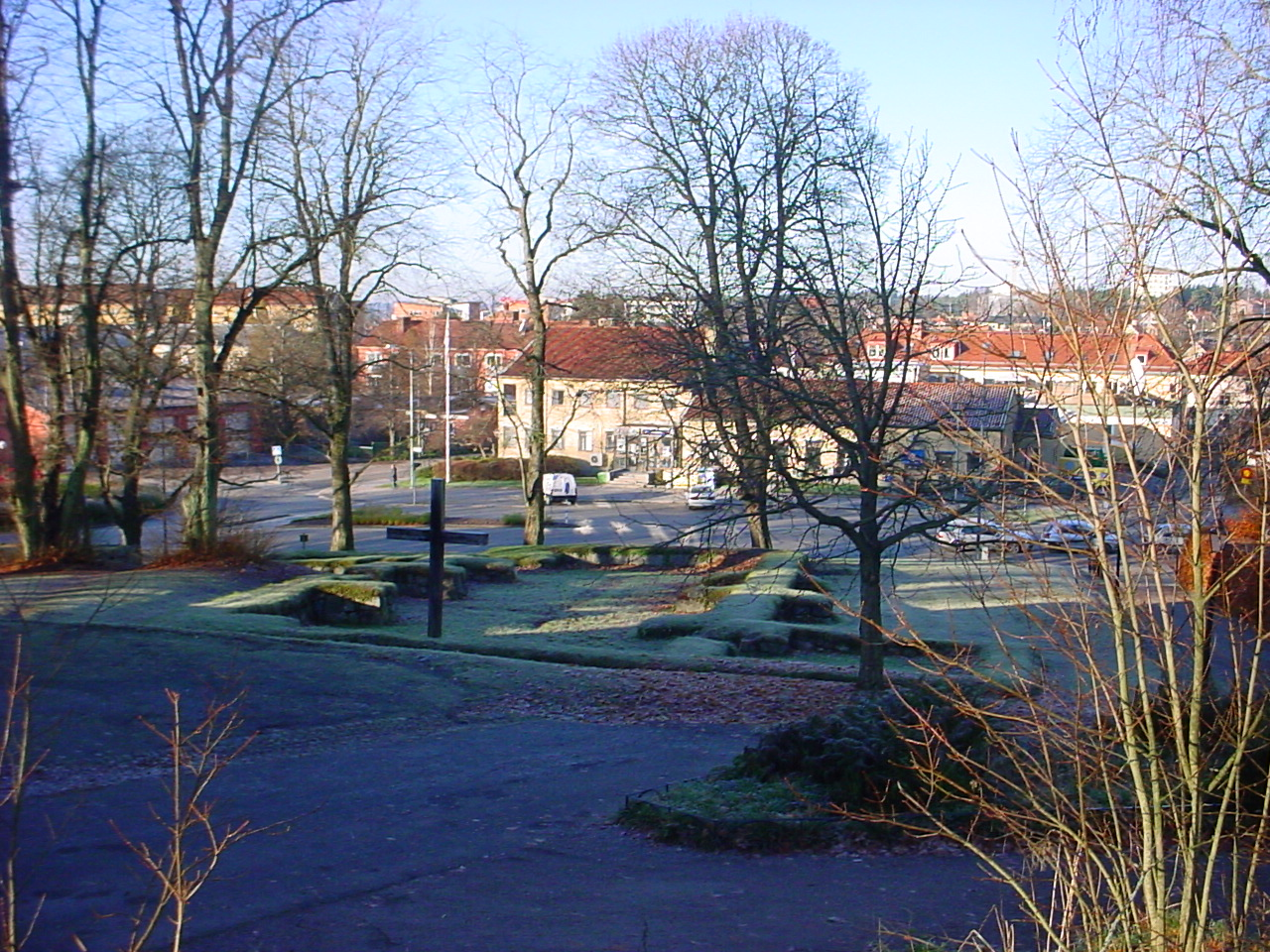
- Enköping in November 2008

- Coat of arms

- Location within Uppsala Location within Sweden
- Coordinates: 59°38′08″N 17°04′35″E
- Country: Sweden
- Province: Uppland
- County: Uppsala County
- Municipality: Enköping Municipality
- Founded: 1300

Area
  - Total: 10.67 km^{2} (4.12 sq mi)
- Elevation: 16 m (52 ft)

Population (31 December 2020)
  - Total: 25,071
  - Density: 2,350/km^{2} (6,086/sq mi)
- Time zone: UTC+1 (CET)
  - Summer (DST): UTC+2 (CEST)
- Postal code: 745 xx
- Area code: (+46) 171
- Website: Official website

Enköping is a locality and the seat of Enköping Municipality, Uppsala County, Sweden, with 30,000 inhabitants in 2018.

== Geography ==
Enköping is situated near Lake Mälaren, about 78 km west of Stockholm. A comparably large number of Swedish cities are located in the vicinity of Enköping. The municipal slogan is therefore "Sweden's Closest City". This expression was created in 1965 when a local business discovered that 38 Swedish cities and a third of Sweden's population were within a radius of 120 kilometers of Enköping.

== History ==
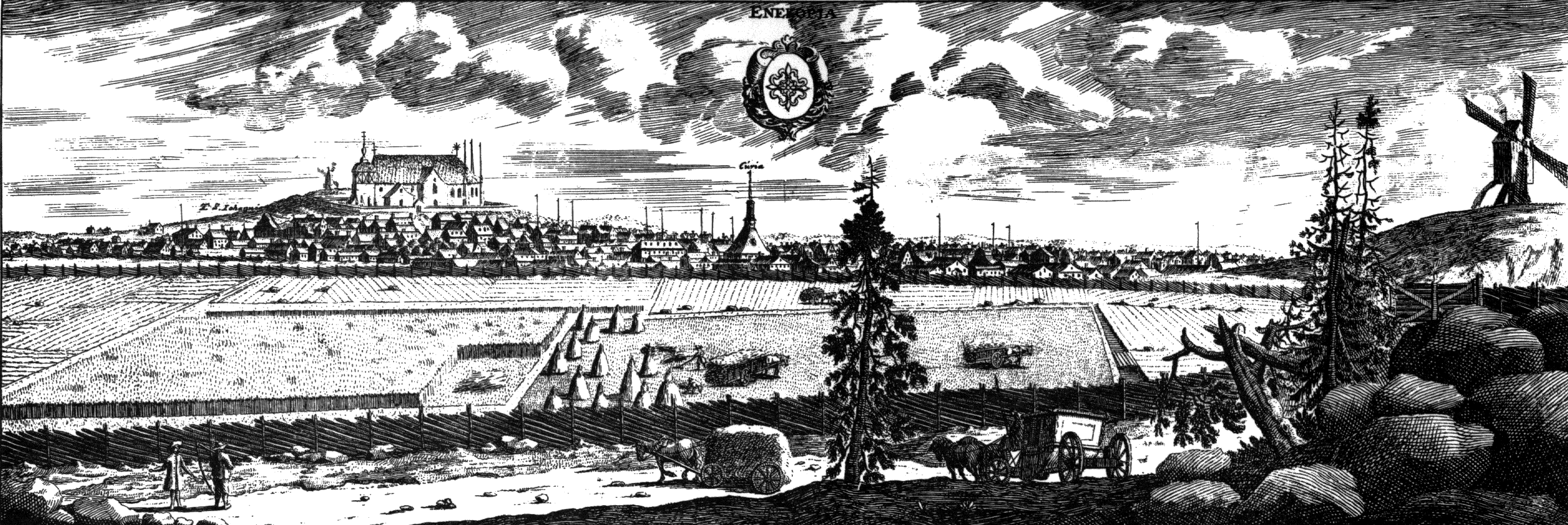
Enköping circa 1700, from Suecia antiqua et hodierna.

Near Enköping, there is some of the best preserved rock art from the Bronze Age present in central Sweden. The city of Enköping itself dates its history back to the 13th century but the city itself did not emerge until about 1250. Enköping was then as now situated by the rich farmlands close to Lake Mälaren, leading to a wealthy rural population. The city has also always been a major crossroads for commerce, and excellent communications signify the city even today: The Mälar Railline (Mälarbanan) and the E18 highway provide ample means of travelling to the nearby major cities of Stockholm and Västerås. The city has several manufacturing industries, a hospital and the Swedish Armed Forces command and control an army electronic warfare centre, Ledningsregementet (LedR).

== Notable people ==
- Amelia Andersdotter
- Snoh Aalegra, singer
- Thomas Engqvist, chess player
- Elin Lanto, singer
- Lars (archbishop) is buried in the monastery there.

== Sports ==
The following sports clubs are located in Enköping:

- Enköpings SK
- Enköpings RK

== Twin towns – sister cities ==
Enköping is twinned with:

- Santa Rosa, Laguna, Philippines
