= Lars-Erik Englund =

Swedish Air Force officer

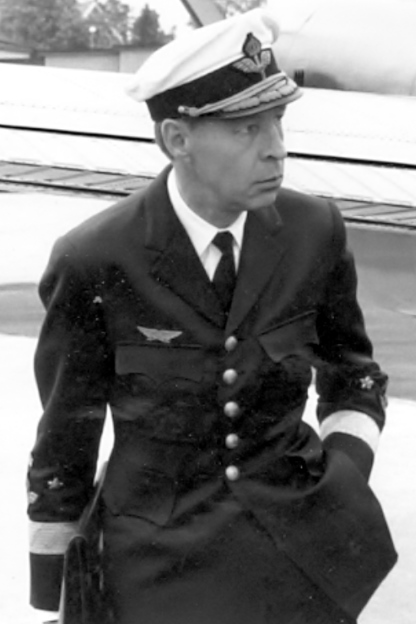
- Born: 23 March 1934; Orsa, Sweden
- Died: 19 October 2010 (aged 76); Stockholm, Sweden
- Military career
- Allegiance: Sweden
- Branch: Swedish Air Force
- Service years: 1958–1994
- Rank: Lieutenant General
- Commands: Section 1, Air Staff; Uppland Wing (deputy); Upper Norrland Military District; Chief of the Air Force

Lieutenant General Lars-Erik Englund (23 March 1934 – 19 October 2010) was a Swedish Air Force officer. His senior appointments included military commander of the Upper Norrland Military District (Milo ÖN) from 1986 to 1988 and Chief of the Air Force/Chief of Air Force Command from 1988 to 1994.

== Early life ==
Englund was born on 23 March 1934 in Orsa, the son of Gunnar and his wife Berta Englund. The Englund family lived in Orsa until he had passed the first year of primary school (småskola). Then the family moved to Sya and he got to go to secondary school (realskola) in Linköping. When he had one year left, he moved to Storvik and there he went to the last year of school and graduated. Then he worked as a road worker and was involved in new installations. He was also engaged in a model aircraft club in Sya. He read a lot of literature about aviation and technology and his orientation in the area were well above average.

== Career ==
The characteristic statements made about Engberg dated 20 March 1952 read; "The general intelligence is above average and he is significantly over in theoretically technical terms. He is slightly under when it comes to engine technology. He has broadly good judgment, but it can easily be pressured because of his youthfulness. Morally speaking, it is very good. [At the age of 18] he has a lot of youthful freshness and immaturity left. He works best to develop his adaptation and ambitions. He appears to have good energy resources and the willingness to make stuff happening and to get somewhere. He has a little youthful inwardity and has, to some extent, learned to reflect on what is happening in life. This approach, however, means that he may be pressured and have some difficulty in making decisions. He is otherwise not nervous and generally has a fresh openness."

"He is sensitive and has ambitions. Much of the school boy is left with him and in some situations he has a disarming naivety. His development is visible mainly going after positive ways. He seems to be able to become powerful in many energy developments and to take initiatives on a relatively significant scale. To date, management it not something he has strived towards, but he appears to be leading if necessary. However, at the present time he would be even better as the willing and honest employee, whose easy-minded mood one can enjoy." Englund started his military career as a sergeant pilot. His assessment in the air dated 30 April 1953 read; "Pretty good flight feeling, but lacking firmness and accuracy. As a rule, good judgment, but easily uncertain in unexpected situations." and on the ground "Calm and sensible. Mediocre opinion. Good sense of order. Good commanding ability."

40 years later, as lieutenant general and Chief of Air Force Command, Engberg commented the characteristic statement; "When I now read about others' view of me as young, I am surprised that the statement is better suited to my subjective view of myself than I had expected. However, it has not been noted that, as young, I could be irrationally insensitive in the exchange of views about almost every subject matter. This edginess in character - and more to it - was to be abolished by the fact that we the students lived close to each other for a long time, and by fact that the comrades delivered their characterological statement immediately and ruthlessly. Many heavy and tough experiences have of course given me increased security, both an inner and an outer calm. But it seems to me that I have not really changed so much since the statement was written. Much of the schoolboy is still left in me. I can still be a little naive, at least in the sense of credulous. I have always liked to be "the willing and honest employee". I realize that my upbringing in my childhood homes meant that I had a hard time finishing the work before I thought it turned out well. This, of course, has - as it is usually called, affected family members - however, not that I feel bad conscience."

His career in the Swedish Air Force began in 1952 with basic pilot training which led to employment as a pilot in 1953. Englund attended the Swedish Armed Forces School for Secondary Education from which he graduated in 1957. Englund became an officer the following year and was commissioned at the Scania Wing (F 10). He would later belong to the exclusive group in the Swedish Air Force called TTT, Tusen Timmar Tunnan ("Thousand Hours [in the] Barrel"), after having logged 1,512 flight hours in the Saab 29 Tunnan. Englund's career continued with further education with flight and staff training. He then underwent the Military Academy's higher staff course from 1966 to 1968. However, from his mid 30s, Englund suffered from Bechterew's disease, which later forced him to abstain from planes with ejection seat for safety reasons.

Englund served in the Defence Staff from 1968 to 1973 and in the Ministry of Defence from 1975 to 1977. In all these positions, he worked with study and planning issues. He then served in the Air Staff from 1977 to 1981 (1979 to 1981 as head of Section 1) and was promoted to colonel in 1979. The year before, in 1978, he attended the Swedish National Defence College. Englund was deputy sector wing commander and wing commander of Uppland Wing (F 16/Se M) from 1981 to 1983. Englund became a member of the Royal Swedish Academy of War Sciences, Section III, Air Warfare Studies, in 1983. In 1983 he was also promoted to major general and was appointed chief of staff of the Eastern Military District (Milo Ö). Englund was then military commander of the Upper Norrland Military District (Milo ÖN) from 1986 to 1988. He was then Chief of the Air Force from 1 October 1988 to 30 June 1994 (when the new Swedish Armed Forces was established) and then Chief of Air Force Command from 1 July to 30 September 1994.

After retirement, he was advisor both in the defense industry and the academic world, including at Linköping University, where he also was a board member. Englund was also a board member of Svenska Dagbladet Foundation (Stiftelsen Svenska Dagbladet). On 1 January 1996, Englund was ordered to assist the Ministry of Defense to investigate the issue of continuing air traffic education in Sweden.

== Personal life ==
In 1954, Englund married Gunn Wendel (died in 1981). He married a second time in 1986 with Birgitta Mårdstam (born 1940). He had three children.

== Dates of rank ==
- 19?? – Second lieutenant
- 19?? – Lieutenant
- 19?? – Captain
- 1971 – Major
- 1972 – Lieutenant colonel
- 1979 – Colonel
- 1983 – Major general
- 1986 – Lieutenant general

== Awards and decorations ==
- (United States) Commander of the Legion of Merit (November 1992)
- (France) Commander of the National Order of Merit (1992)
- Commander 1st Class of the Order of the White Rose of Finland (1992)
- (Sweden) Swedish Air Force Volunteers Association Medal of Merit in gold (1994)
- (Sweden) Swedish Air Force Volunteers Association Medal of Merit in silver (1991)

== Bibliography ==
- Englund, Lars-Erik (1993). Flygvapnet i morgon: doktriner får aldrig bli dogmer. Försvar i nutid, 0046-4643; 1993:5 (in Swedish). Stockholm: Centralförb. Folk och försvar. SELIBR 1762605.

Military offices
Preceded by None	Uppland Wing; 1981–1983	Succeeded by Jan-Olov Gezelius
Preceded by Bengt Gustafsson	Upper Norrland Military District; 1986–1988	Succeeded by Åke Sagrén
Preceded by Sven-Olof Olson	Chief of the Air Force/Chief of Air Force Command; 1988–1994	Succeeded by Kent Harrskog
