= Bengt Gustafsson (general) =

Swedish Army officer (1933–2019)

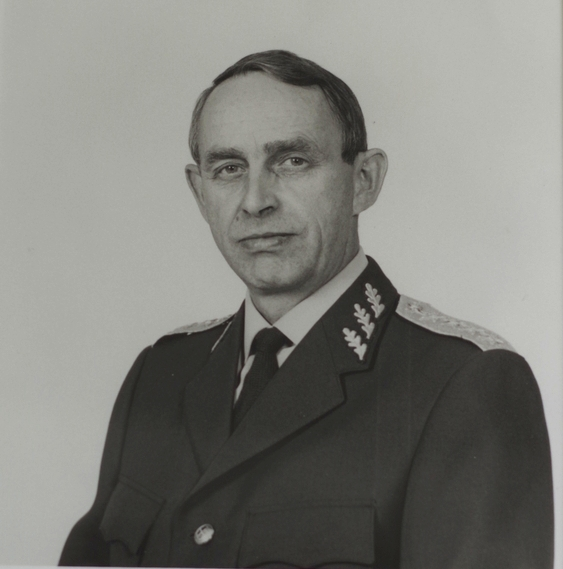
- Born: Sten Bengt Gustaf Gustafsson; 2 December 1933; Hästveda, Sweden
- Died: 15 March 2019 (aged 85); Stockholm, Sweden
- Military career
- Allegiance: Sweden
- Branch: Swedish Army
- Service years: 1955–1994
- Rank: General
- Commands: Svea Engineer Regiment; Upper Norrland Military District; Supreme Commander

General Sten Bengt Gustaf Gustafsson (2 December 1933 – 15 March 2019) was a senior Swedish Army officer. Gustafsson's military career began as a sergeant pilot. He underwent various promotions and training, including attending the Royal Swedish Army Staff College and becoming an officer in Boden Engineer Corps. His roles ranged from lieutenant to colonel, and he served in important positions, such as Director at the Swedish Civil Defence Board and Permanent Secretary in the Ministry of Defence.

Gustafsson's journey included attending the National Defence College and culminated in his appointment as Supreme Commander of the Swedish Armed Forces in 1986. His tenure saw challenges like submarine hunts and significant global events like the fall of the Berlin Wall and the dissolution of the Warsaw Pact.

Additionally, Gustafsson held memberships and board positions in defense-related organizations, including the Royal Swedish Academy of War Sciences, the General Defense Association, Swedair, and the National Swedish Board of Voluntary Military Training. He retired in 1994.

== Early life ==
Gustafsson was born on 2 December 1933 in Hästveda, Sweden, the son of Gustav Svensson, a radio technician, and his wife Frida (née Lundell). Gustafsson's early interests included football, handball, chess and bridge, running and high jump. In the primary school (folkskola), he did not like the teacher very well, but in the secondary school (realskola) it went better, but the adaptation was not quite good, as there was some teachers he found it hard to get along with. Gustafsson also had difficulty in being quiet at the lessons.

Gustafsson graduated without any detention in the spring of 1950 with passed grades. Then he worked at a gas station until Christmas 1950, after which he quit there because it was too cold and badly paid. Gustafsson then worked at a social insurance agency with registers and such but thought it was monotonous. For many years, he had thought to become a pilot, preferably officer, otherwise in the commercial aviation. He'd otherwise thought of a possible engineering education. Gustafsson studied at the education company Hermods AB, courses in practical mathematics, aerodynamics, aeronautics, airplane engines and materials.

== Career ==
The characteristic statements made about Gustafsson dated 7 March 1951 read; "his general intelligence as a whole, barely above average, as well as technical understanding and flight orientation, while the engine test gives a score above average. The review in social and psychological issues about normal for the age. Also maturation is about average, medium energy resources and reasonably able to organize them. Emotional life a little immature and not very nuanced, largely stable. Initiative mediocre, the ability to moderate endurance. Reliability and responsibility are not yet fully mature, but probably acceptable. Deficiencies in any adaptation, has little difficulty with self-discipline."

Gustafsson started his military career as a sergeant pilot. Gustafsson was admitted to the training but did not quite manage the flight itself. Gustafsson's assessment in the air dated 27 July 1951 read; "Poor sense of speed. Immature, forgetful, sloppy. Poor attention distribution. Poor mental activity in the air." and on the ground "Good ability, initiative and energetic. Calm and sensible. Reliable. Intelligent." 40 years later, as general and Supreme Commander, Gustafsson commented the characteristic statement "which shows, which eventually becomes a life experience, that it takes a long time, individually different long time, to be reasonably complete as an adult. In a jokeful manner you might say that it soon turned out that I fitted best on the ground when comparing ratings from air and ground teachers." He attended the Royal Swedish Army Staff College in 1959 and became an officer in Boden Engineer Corps (Ing 3). Gustafsson was promoted to lieutenant in 1961 and attended the Military Academy in 1966 and was promoted to captain the following year. He was the General Staff Officer in the Army Staff and the Defence Staff from 1966 to 1979 and was Director at the Swedish Civil Defence Board from 1970 to 1973.

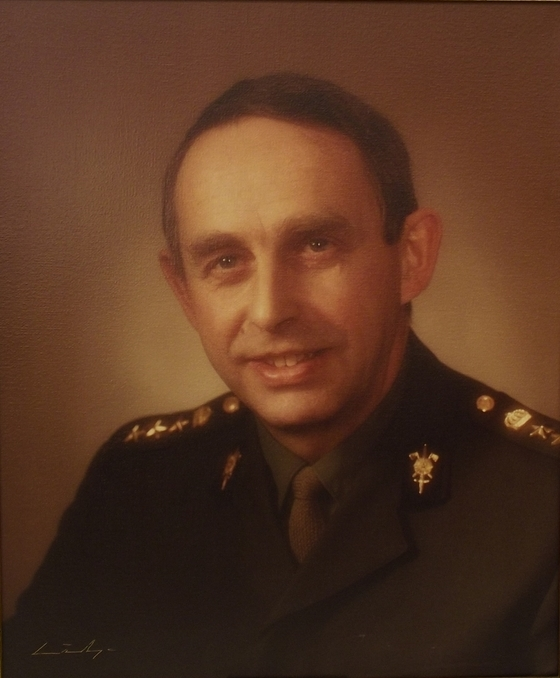
Colonel Gustafsson, as commander of Svea Engineer Regiment 1981–82.

Gustafsson attended the National Defence College in 1971 and 1982. He was promoted to major in 1972, to lieutenant colonel in 1974 and to lieutenant colonel with special position held in 1975. Gustafsson was appointed battalion commander at Älvsborg Regiment (I 15) in 1979 and was promoted to colonel and was appointed regimental commander of Svea Engineer Regiment (Ing 1) in 1981. He was promoted to senior colonel in 1982 and was appointed Permanent Secretary in the Ministry of Defence, a position he stayed in until 1984. Gustafsson was given a "jump-step" promotion which allowed him to advance two ranks, from senior colonel to lieutenant general, skipping major general, when he was appointed military commander of the Upper Norrland Military District (Milo ÖN) from 1 October 1984. He served there for two years. He was promoted to general and assumed the post of Supreme Commander in 1986. Gustafsson's term as Supreme Commander was marked initially by continued submarine hunts, but came increasingly to be about the fall of the Berlin Wall and the dissolution of the Warsaw Pact. Although the effects both for the world and for the Swedish defense policy became even clearer for the next Supreme Commander. In 1992, his appointment as Supreme Commander was extended to 1 July 1994, when he retired.

Gustafsson became a member of the Royal Swedish Academy of War Sciences in 1979. In 1990, Gustafsson became an honorary member of the Royal Swedish Society of Naval Sciences, but he left in 2004. Gustafsson became a board member of the General Defense Association (Allmänna försvarsföreningen) in 1982, of Swedair in 1983 and the National Swedish Board of Voluntary Military Training (Överstyrelsen för frivillig befälsutbildning) in 1984.

== Personal life ==
In 1957 he married Inger Gustafsson. They had three children, one son and two daughters.

== Death ==
Gustafsson died in his home on 15 March 2019. The funeral was held at Hedvig Eleonora Church in Stockholm on 5 April 2019.

== Dates of rank ==
Promotions
Rank	Date
Second lieutenant	1959
Lieutenant	1961
Captain	1967
Major	1972
Lieutenant colonel	1974
Colonel	1981
Senior colonel	1982
Major general	– (Note: Gustafsson was given a "jump-step" promotion which allowed him to advance two ranks, from senior colonel to lieutenant general, skipping major general, when he was appointed military commander of the Upper Norrland Military District (Milo ÖN) from 1 October 1984.)
Lieutenant general	1 October 1984
General	1 October 1986

== Awards and decorations ==
=== Swedish ===
- (Sweden) H. M. The King's Medal, 12th size gold medal with chain (1992)
- (Sweden) Swedish Air Force Volunteers Association Medal of Merit in gold (1994)
- (Sweden) Royal Swedish Academy of War Sciences Medal of Reward in gold, 15th size (12 November 2016)
- (Sweden) Swedish Women's Voluntary Defence Organization Royal Medal of Merit (March 1990)

=== Foreign ===
- (Estonia) 1st Class of the Order of the Cross of the Eagle (2 February 2005)

== Bibliography ==
- Gustafsson, Bengt (2010). Sanningen om ubåtsfrågan: ett försök till analys. Försvaret och det kalla kriget (FOKK), 1652-5388; 23 (in Swedish). Stockholm: Santérus. ISBN 978-91-7359-040-2. SELIBR 11832973.
- Gustafsson, Bengt (2007). Det sovjetiska hotet mot Sverige under det kalla kriget. Publikation / Försvaret och det kalla kriget (FOKK), 1652-5388; 12 (in Swedish) (1st ed.). Stockholm: Försvarshögskolan. ISBN 978-91-85401-84-0. SELIBR 10684177.
- Gustafsson, Bengt (2006). Det "kalla kriget": några reflexioner. Publikation / Försvaret och det kalla kriget (FOKK), 1652-5388; 9 (in Swedish). Stockholm: Försvarshögskolan. ISBN 91-85401-55-2. SELIBR 10315918.
- Gustafsson, Bengt (1994). Åtta år av förändring (in Swedish). Stockholm: Informationsavd., Försvarsmakten. ISBN 91-972385-0-3. SELIBR 7796994.

== Footnotes ==
Military offices
Preceded by Erik G. Bengtsson	Upper Norrland Military District; 1984–1986	Succeeded by Lars-Erik Englund
Preceded by Lennart Ljung	Supreme Commander of the Swedish Armed Forces; 1986–1994	Succeeded by Owe Wiktorin
