= Carl-Gustaf Ståhl =

Major General of Swedish Army, Force Commander of the UNDOF

- Born: 15 November 1920; Copenhagen, Denmark
- Died: 11 April 2016 (aged 95); Båstad, Sweden
- Military career
- Allegiance: Sweden
- Branch: Swedish Army
- Service years: 1942–1982
- Rank: Major General
- Nickname: "C-G"
- Commands: Swedish battalion in Cyprus; Main Army Materiel Department; UNDOF
- Conflicts: Cyprus problem (1964–65); Arab–Israeli conflict (1982–85)

Major General Carl-Gustaf Ståhl (15 November 1920 – 11 April 2016) was a Swedish Army officer. Ståhl's military career began in 1940 when he joined the Military Academy Karlberg in Stockholm, graduating in 1942 as a second lieutenant. Over the years, he underwent further training and rose through the ranks, serving in various capacities within the Swedish military. Notably, he commanded the third Swedish battalion in Cyprus as part of the UN Peacekeeping Force and later served as a military attaché in Washington, D.C., and Ottawa. Promoted to major general in 1972, he held significant roles in the Swedish Defence Materiel Administration before entering the reserves in 1982. Ståhl's international service continued as he commanded the United Nations Disengagement Observer Force in Damascus from 1982 to 1985, achieving notable success in facilitating a prisoner exchange between Syria and Israel. Post-retirement, he contributed to educational initiatives on behalf of the Swedish Ecclesiastical Educational Association, receiving recognition for his work on the Middle East Project.

== Early life ==
Ståhl was born on 15 November 1920 in Copenhagen, Denmark, the son of Torsten Ståhl and his wife Siri (née Maniette). He grew up in Copenhagen with two siblings. His father was the director of Cederslunds Punch in Denmark. Ståhl passed studentexamen in Copenhagen in 1939. Ståhl dreamed of becoming an engineer, but World War II put an end to that dream. Instead, he was mobilized for military service with the Göta Engineer Regiment in Eksjö. As the war seemed to be prolonged, he sought officer training.

== Career ==
Ståhl enrolled at the Military Academy Karlberg in Stockholm in 1940. He attended the same class as the future Chief of the Army Staff, Major General Gösta Hökmark. Ståhl graduated in 1942 and was commissioned as an officer the same year and was assigned as a second lieutenant into the Swedish Engineer Troops. He studied at the Engineer Officers' School (Ingenjörofficersskolan) in 1945 and attended the Advanced Course at the Artillery and Engineering College from 1947 to 1949. Ståhl was promoted to captain in 1950 and entered the General Staff Corps in 1953. He served as an office head in the Defence Staff from 1953 to 1956, military secretary in the 1953 Fortification Management Investigation (1953 års fortifikationsförvaltningsutredning), section chief at the VI Military District staff from 1956 to 1958, and chief of the Planning Department in the Army Staff from 1960 to 1962, being promoted to major in 1960. He attended the General Course at the Swedish National Defence College in 1962. After being promoted to lieutenant colonel in 1963, he served as acting commander of the Göta Engineer Regiment from 1963 to 1964.

On 12 October 1964, Ståhl succeeded Colonel Jonas Wærn as commander of the third Swedish battalion of 894 men in Cyprus, part of the United Nations Peacekeeping Force in Cyprus (UNFICYP). He served in this position until April 1965. On 1 April 1966 he was promoted to colonel. After that, he served as a military attaché at the embassies in Washington, D.C., and Ottawa from 1966 to 1972 and attended the Senior Staff Course at the Swedish National Defence College in 1972. Ståhl was chairman of the Swedish Defence Automobile Association (Försvarets motorklubb, FMK) in the 1970s and the 1980s.

After his promotion to major general in 1972, he served at the Swedish Defence Materiel Administration from 1972 to 1982: as head of Central Planning from 1972 to 1974 and as head of the Main Army Materiel Department from 1974 to 1982. Ståhl entered the reserves in 1982. On 5 May 1982, Ståhl was appointed commander of the United Nations Disengagement Observer Force (UNDOF), with headquarters in Damascus, with effect from 1 June 1982, replacing Major General Erkki R. Kaira of Finland. UNDOF consisted of approximately 1,200 personnel with the main forces from Finland, Austria, Canada, and Poland. His greatest success was the prisoner exchange between Syria and Israel. Ståhl served as commander of UNDOF until 1985.

Ståhl served as a consultant to the Swedish Ecclesiastical Educational Association (SKS) from 1987 to 1998. In 1990, Ståhl and Bishop Emeritus Olle Nivenius each received SKS's cultural prize. Ståhl received his prize for the SKS Middle East Project, including authoring study materials about the Arab–Israeli conflict and the role of the United Nations in the Middle East.

== Personal life ==
In 1943, Ståhl married Margaretha Engdahl (1920–2001), the daughter of Gunnar Engdahl and Signe (née Sörensen). They had two children: Gunilla (born 1944) and Claes-Göran (born 1948). From his retirement until his death, he resided in Båstad. He was very active in community life and often contributed with lectures on various social issues and his experiences from his many international assignments. Until the age of 95, he was, among other things, a leader of the senior citizen gymnastics in Båstad.

== Death ==
Ståhl died on 11 April 2016 in Båstad, Skåne County, Sweden. The funeral service took place at St. Mary's Church in Båstad on 26 May 2016.

== Dates of rank ==
- 1942 – Second lieutenant
- ???? – Lieutenant
- 1950 – Captain
- 1960 – Major
- 1963 – Lieutenant colonel
- 1 April 1966 – Colonel
- 1972 – Major general

== Awards and decorations ==
- (Sweden) Commander 1st Class of the Order of the Sword (6 June 1974)
- (Sweden) Knight of the Order of the Sword (1961)
- (Austria) Grand Decoration of Honour in Silver with Star (February 1980)

== Honours ==
- Member of the Royal Swedish Academy of War Sciences (1974)

Military offices
Preceded by Jonas Wærn	Swedish battalion in Cyprus; 1964–1965	Succeeded by Sten Geijer
Preceded by Nils Sköld	Main Army Materiel Department, FMV; 1974–1982	Succeeded by Helge Gard
Preceded by Erkki R. Kaira	United Nations Disengagement Observer Force (UNDOF); 1982–1985	Succeeded by Gustav Hägglund
