= Åke Sagrén =

Swedish Army officer

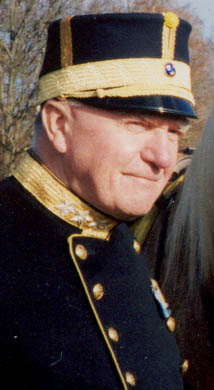
- Sagrén in 2008.
- Born: Karl Åke Sagrén; 26 January 1935; Motala, Sweden
- Died: 12 December 2022 (aged 87); Täby, Sweden
- Military career
- Allegiance: Sweden
- Branch: Swedish Army
- Service years: 1958–1996
- Rank: Lieutenant General
- Commands: Västernorrland Regiment; Sollefteå Army Garrison; Västernorrland Defence District; Chief of Staff, Milo ÖN; Upper Norrland Military District; Chief of the Army; Chief of Army Command

Lieutenant General Karl Åke Sagrén (26 January 1935 – 12 December 2022) was a Swedish Army officer. He was Chief of the Army from 1990 to 1994 and Chief of Army Command from 1994 to 1996.

== Early life ==
Sagrén was born on 26 January 1935 in Motala, Sweden, the son of Karl Sagrén, an engineer, and his wife Annie (née Myrman). His father joined the Home Guard, the first day it was established and at the age of 15, Sagrén knew that he wanted to become an officer. Sagrén passed studentexamen in 1955 and became an officer in 1958.

== Career ==
=== Military career ===
Sagrén served at the Life Grenadier Regiment (I 4) and the Army Ranger School from 1958 to 1967 and was completed the higher course of the Swedish Armed Forces Staff College from 1967 to 1969. He then served at the Army Staff from 1969 to 1973 and the Eastern Military District (Milo Ö) from 1973 to 1976. He served in the Defence Staff from 1976 to 1982 and was commanding officer of the Västernorrland Regiment (I 21) and Sollefteå Army Garrison from 1982 to 1983. Sagrén was commanding officer of the Västernorrland Regiment and was Defence District Commander of the Västernorrland Defense District (Fo 23) from 1983 to 1984. On 1 April 1984, he became director and head of the Planning and Budget Secretariat (PBS) at the Ministry of Defence in Stockholm. He was promoted to major general in 1985 and on 1 October 1986, he assumed the position of chief of staff of the Upper Norrland Military District (Milo ÖN). On 1 October 1988, Sagrén assumed the position of military commander of the Upper Norrland Military District, succeeding lieutenant general Lars-Erik Englund. On 1 April 1990, Sagrén succeeded lieutenant general Erik G. Bengtsson as Chief of the Army. He held the post until 30 June 1994 and the post of Chief of Army Command from 1 July 1994 to 1996.

=== Other work ===
Sagrén was secretary in the 1974 Defense Investigation and expert in 1978 Defense Committee as well as the 1984 Defense Committee. He became a member of the Royal Swedish Academy of War Sciences in 1978. Sagrén was chairman of the board of the Fältrittklubben from 1996 to 2001 (honorary member in 2001), of the Army, Navy and Air Film (Föreningen Armé- Marin- och Flygfilm) from 1996 to 2001, of the Försvarsfrämjandet from 2000 until its closure in 2004 and of the Swedish Fencing Federation (Svenska Fäktförbundet) as well as the honorary general secretary of the Association of Home Guard Officers (Hemvärnsbefälets Riksförbund). Sagrén was also deputy chairman of the board of the Karolinska förbundet.

== Personal life ==
In 1982 he married Yvonne Öström (born 1947). He has three children.

== Death ==
Sagrén died on 12 December 2022 in Täby, Sweden. The funeral service was held on 27 January 2023 in Täby Church. Attendees, among others, where the former Chiefs of the Army, Lieutenant General Mertil Melin, Major General Paul Degerlund, General Sverker Göranson and Major General Berndt Grundevik.

== Dates of rank ==
- 1958 – Second lieutenant
- 19?? – Lieutenant
- 19?? – Captain
- 19?? – Major
- 19?? – Lieutenant colonel
- 19?? – Colonel
- 1982 – Senior colonel
- 1985 – Major general
- 1988 – Lieutenant general

== Awards and decorations ==
- (Sweden) For Zealous and Devoted Service of the Realm
- (Sweden) Pro Musica Militare (1996)

Military offices
Preceded by Bengt Sjöberg	Västernorrland Regiment; 1982–1983	Succeeded by Lennart Rönnberg
Preceded by Bengt Sjöberg	Västernorrland Defence District; 1982–1984	Succeeded by Göte Bergerbrant
Preceded by None	Sollefteå Army Garrison; 1983–1984	Succeeded by Göte Bergerbrant
Preceded by Lars-Erik Englund	Chief of Staff of the Upper Norrland Military District; 1986–1988	Succeeded by Carl-Johan Rundberg
Preceded by Lars-Erik Englund	Upper Norrland Military District; 1988–1990	Succeeded by Curt Sjöö
Preceded by Erik G. Bengtsson	Chief of the Army; 1990–1994	Succeeded by Himself as Chief of Army Command
Preceded by Himself as Chief of the Army	Chief of Army Command; 1994–1996	Succeeded by Mertil Melin
