= Erik G. Bengtsson =

Swedish Army officer

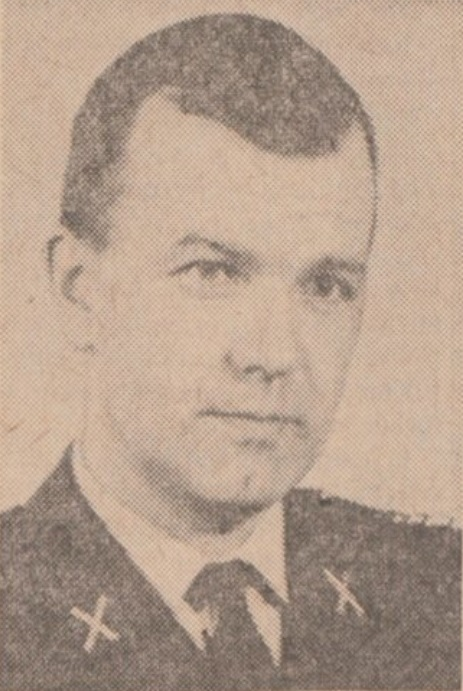
- Bengtsson as captain (circa 1967).
- Born: Erik Gustav Bengtsson; 14 July 1928 (age 98); Visnum, Sweden
- Died: 27 April 2025 (aged 96); Lovö, Sweden
- Military career
- Allegiance: Sweden
- Branch: Swedish Army
- Service years: 1952–1990
- Rank: Lieutenant General
- Commands: Chief of Staff, Milo Ö; Upper Norrland Military District; Chief of the Army

Lieutenant General Erik Gustav Bengtsson (born 14 July 1928 – 27 April 2025) was a Swedish Army officer. He was Chief of the Army from 1984 to 1990.

== Early life ==
Bengtsson was born on 14 July 1928 in Visnum, Värmland County, Sweden, the son of Erik Bengtsson, a farmer, and his wife Hildur (née Löfstedt). He passed studentexamen in 1951.

== Career ==
Bengtsson was commissioned as an officer in Norrland Artillery Regiment (A 4) in 1952. Bengtsson attended the Royal Swedish Army Staff College from 1958 to 1961 and served in the Army Staff from 1961 to 1964 and in the Defence Staff from 1964 to 1967.

He served in Norrland Artillery Regiment (A 4) in 1967 and the Defence Staff in 1968. Bengtsson then served in Boden Artillery Regiment (A 8) in 1972 and was section chief in the Military District Staff within the Upper Norrland Military District (Milo ÖN) in 1973. He was promoted to colonel and was chief of education in Boden Artillery Regiment (A 8) and the Boden Defence District (Fo 63) in 1975.

Bengtsson was promoted to senior colonel and was appointed vice chief in the Military District Staff within the Upper Norrland Military District in 1977. He was promoted to major general and became chief of staff of the Eastern Military District (Milo Ö) in 1978. Bengtsson was promoted to lieutenant general and served as military commander of the Upper Norrland Military District from 1 October 1980 to 1984 and then as the Chief of Army from 1 October 1984 to 1990. As Chief of Army, Bengtsson was also Superior Commanding Officer for the Swedish UN forces, including the Swedish contingent in Cyprus which was part of UNFICYP.

== Other work ==
Bengtsson was a member of the Royal Swedish Academy of War Sciences. He was chairman of Wermländska Sällskapet i Stockholm from 1987 to 2000, chairman of the Swedish Sport Shooting Federation (Svenska Sportskytteförbundet) and chairman of the AFCEA. Bengtsson was military writer for several newspapers and magazines.

== Personal life ==
In 1949, Bengtsson married Ulla Axelsson (1927–2019), the daughter of master painter Axel Jansson and Gerda (née Ohlsson). Bengtsson was the father of preschool teacher Anna-Lena Margareta, Maria and Lars-Magnus (1950–2003).

== Death ==
Bengtsson died on 27 April 2025 in Lovö Parish, Ekerö Municipality, Stockholm County. He was interred on 25 June 2025 at Lovö Cemetery.

== Dates of rank ==
- 1952 – Second lieutenant
- ???? – Lieutenant
- 1962 – Captain
- 1968 – Major
- 1970 – Lieutenant colonel
- 1975 – Colonel
- 1977 – Senior colonel
- 1978 – Major general
- 1 October 1980 – Lieutenant general

== Awards and decorations ==
- (Sweden) Knight of the Order of the Sword (6 June 1970)
- (Norway) Commander with Star of the Royal Norwegian Order of Merit (8 September 1989)

Military offices
Preceded by Nils-Fredrik Palmstierna	Chief of Staff of the Eastern Military District; 1978–1980	Succeeded by Gustaf Welin
Preceded by Karl-Gösta Lundmark	Upper Norrland Military District; 1980–1984	Succeeded by Bengt Gustafsson
Preceded by Nils Sköld	Chief of the Army; 1984–1990	Succeeded by Åke Sagrén
