= Nils Björk =

Swedish Army officer (1898–1989)

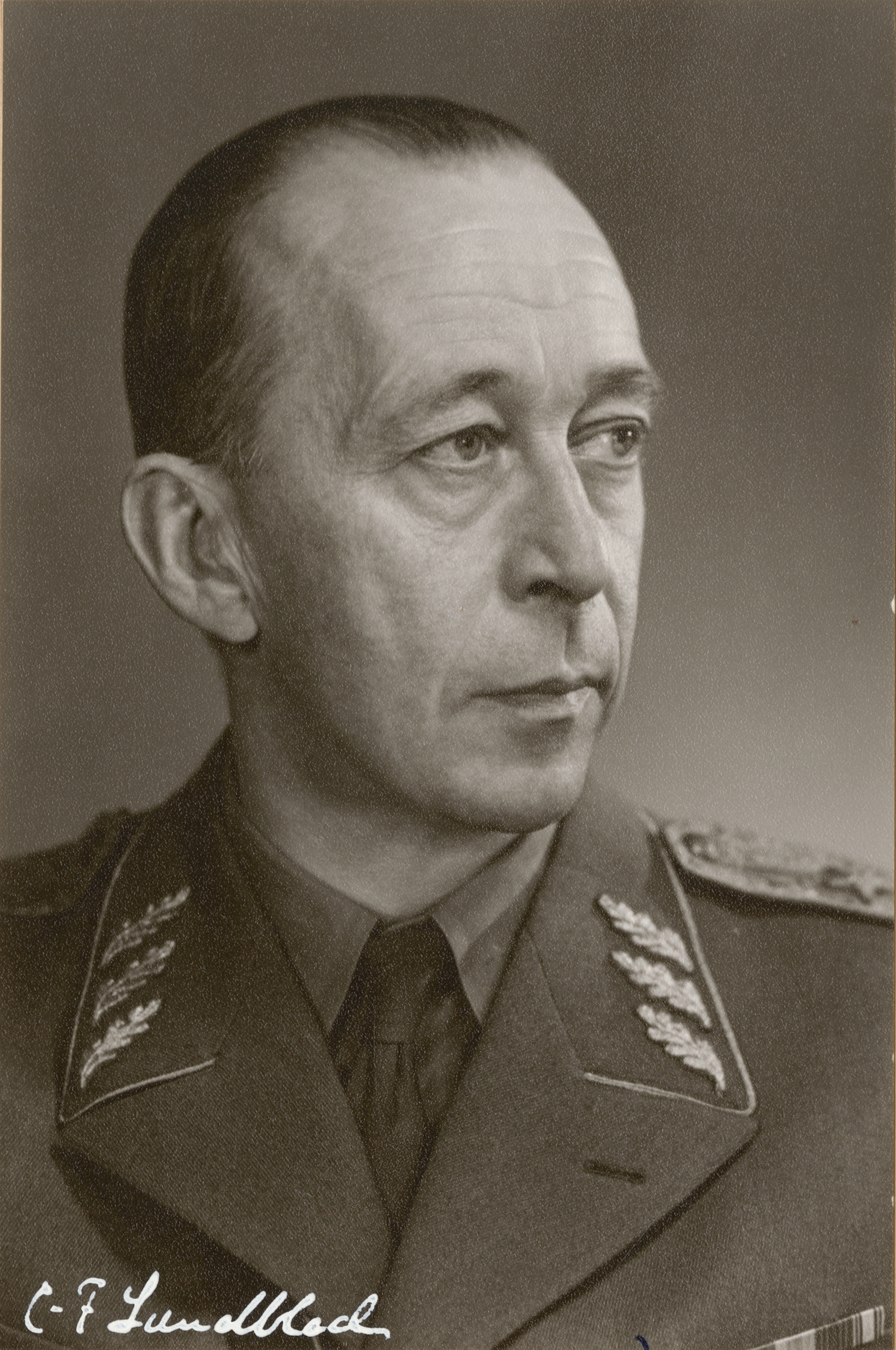
- Born: Nils Axel Hjalmar Björk; 25 February 1898; Västerås, Sweden
- Died: 15 April 1989 (aged 91); Flen, Sweden
- Military career
- Allegiance: Sweden
- Branch: Swedish Army
- Service years: 1918–1963
- Rank: Lieutenant General
- Commands: Norrbotten Regiment; Skaraborg Regiment; Section 2, Army Staff; VI Military District

Lieutenant General Nils Axel Hjalmar Björk (25 February 1898 – 15 April 1989) was a senior Swedish Army officer. He served as Commanding General of the VI Military District from 1951 to 1963.

== Early life ==
Björk was born on 25 February 1898 in Västerås, Sweden, the son of Axel Björk, a master tailor, and his wife Anna (née Nilsson). He passed studentexamen in Västerås in 1916.

== Career ==
Björk was commissioned as an officer in 1918 and was assigned as a second lieutenant to Västmanland Regiment (I 18). He was promoted to lieutenant in 1920 and attended the Royal Swedish Army Staff College from 1925 to 1927 and transferred to Västernorrland Regiment (I 21) in 1928 after I 18 was disbanded. Björk served as captain in the General Staff in 1931. Björk was military expert in the 1930 Defense Commission (1930 års försvarskommission) from 1933 to 1936. Björk was one of the contributors to Antingen – eller ("Either – Or"), which was of fundamental importance for the rearmament work and the Defence Act of 1936. He served in Svea Life Guards in 1937 and became major in the General Staff Corps in 1938. Björk succeeded lieutenant colonel Carl August Ehrensvärd as head of Army Operations Department in the Defence Staff in 1939 and in this position had the immediate responsibility for the planning of the extensive operational contingency measures for the Swedish Army during the war years 1939–1942. In 1940, Björk was a member of the Home Guard Investigation Committee. In 1941 he became lieutenant colonel in the General Staff Corps. During this time, Björk also served as a representative of the Swedish Armed Forces in the national board of the Swedish Red Cross from 1939 to 1942.

Björk served in Värmland Regiment (I 2) in 1942 and was promoted to colonel in 1942 and then served as commander of Norrbotten Regiment (I 19) from 1942 to 1946. In 1944, he served as chief of the Evacuation Staff during the evacuation from northern Finland in 1944. Björk served as commander of Skaraborg Regiment (P 4) from 1946 to 1948. He was then colonel in the General Staff Corps and head of Section 2 of the Army Staff from 1948 to 1951 when he was promoted to major general. Björk then served as Commanding General of the VI Military District from 1951 to 1963 when he retired and was promoted to lieutenant general on the reserve list.

== Personal life ==
In 1922, Björk married Margit Borgman (1899–1970), the daughter of agronomist Gösta Borgman and Sigrid (née Rundberg). He was the father of the daughters Barbro (born 1924) and Hervor (born 1925).

== Dates of rank ==
- 1918 – Second lieutenant
- 1920 – Lieutenant
- 1931 – Captain
- 1938 – Major
- 1941 – Lieutenant colonel
- 1942 – Colonel
- 1951 – Major general
- 1962 – Lieutenant general

== Awards and decorations ==
- (Sweden) Commander Grand Cross of the Order of the Sword (6 June 1958)
- (Sweden) Commander of the Order of Vasa
- (Sweden) Knight of the Order of the Polar Star
- (Sweden) Swedish Central Federation for Voluntary Military Training Medal of Merit in gold
- (Sweden) Swedish Women's Voluntary Defence Organization Royal Medal of Merit in gold
- (Sweden) Home Guard Medal of Merit in gold
- (Sweden) Swedish Red Cross Medal of Merit (Svenska Rödakorsets förtjänstmedalj)
- (Sweden) (Befälsutbildningsförbunds förtjänstmedalj i silver)
- (Sweden) Norrbotten Association for Volunteer Military Training in gold (Norrbotten befäls(utbildnings)förbunds guldmedalj)
- (Sweden) Norrbotten Shooting Association's gold medal (Norrbottens skytteförbunds guldmedalj)
- (Sweden) Central Board of the National Swedish Rifle Association's silver medal (Sveriges skytteförbunds överstyrelses silvermedalj)

=== Foreign ===
- (Norway) Grand Cross of the Order of St. Olav (1 July 1961)
- Commander of the Order of the White Rose of Finland
- (Finland) 3rd Class of the Order of the Cross of Liberty with swords
- (Finland) Finnish Population Protection Merit of Merit, 1st class with clasp (Finlands Befolkningsskydds förtjänstmedalj, 1:a klass med spänne)
- (Finland) Finnish Commemorative Medal for Humanitarian Activities (Finsk minnesmedalj för humanitär verksamhet)

== Honours ==
- Member of the Royal Swedish Academy of War Sciences (1944)
- Member of the Royal Skyttean Society (1957)

== Bibliography ==
- Björk, Nils (1938). Tre nordiska försvarsproblem: Nordskandinavien, Öresund, Åland : Orienterande synpunkter framlagda vid föredrag den 16 februari 1938 [Three Nordic defense problems: Northern Scandinavia, Öresund, Åland: Orienting views presented at lectures on 16 February 1938] (in Swedish). Stockholm: Militaria. SELIBR 1361718.
- Björk, Nils; Swedlund, Nils (1936). Den nya infanteriorganisationen jämte exempel belysande förbandens taktiska användning [The new infantry organization along with examples illustrating the tactical use of the units]. Kungl. Krigsvetenskapsakademiens handlingar och tidskrift, 0023-5369; 1936:1 (in Swedish). Stockholm: Krigsvetenskaps-akad. SELIBR 1376929.

Military offices
Preceded by Carl August Ehrensvärd	Army Operations Department, Defence Staff; 1938–1941	Succeeded by None
Preceded by Sven Ramström	Norrbotten Regiment; 1942–1946	Succeeded by Nils Swedlund
Preceded by Birger Pontén	Skaraborg Regiment; 1946–1948	Succeeded by Per Ahlgren
Preceded by None	Section 2, Army Staff; 1948–1951	Succeeded by Bert Carpelan
Preceded by Sven Colliander	Commanding General, VI Military District; 1951–1963	Succeeded by Arne Mohlin
