= Arne Mohlin =

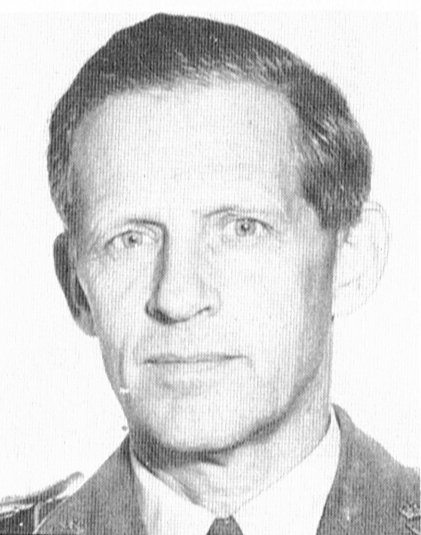
- Born: Arne Herman Mohlin; 9 October 1909; Stockholm, Sweden
- Died: 2 May 1992 (aged 82); Täby, Sweden
- Burial place: Djursholm Cemetery
- Military career
- Allegiance: Sweden
- Branch: Swedish Army
- Service years: 1930–1972
- Rank: Lieutenant General
- Commands: Göta Engineer Corps; Halland Regiment; Chief of the Army Staff; General Staff Corps; VI Military District; Upper Norrland Military District

Lieutenant General Arne Herman Mohlin (9 October 1909 – 2 May 1992) was a Swedish Army officer. Mohlin served as Chief of the Army Staff and the General Staff Corps from 1961 to 1963 and he was commanding officer of the VI Military District/Upper Norrland Military District from 1963 to 1972. Mohlin is also famous for being one of two survivors of SS Hansa which was torpedoed in 1944 which killed 84 people.

== Early life ==
Mohlin was born on 9 October 1909 in Engelbrekt Parish, Stockholm, Sweden, the son of Einar Mohlin, an adjunct lecturer, and his wife Gunhild (née Appelqvist).

== Career ==
He was commissioned as an officer with the rank of second lieutenant in the Swedish Fortification Corps in 1930. He became captain in the Swedish Engineer Troops in 1940 and served in the General Staff Corps in 1944. In 1944 Mohlin was aboard SS Hansa on his way to a military inspection on Gotland when it was torpedoed by the Soviet submarine L21. 84 people died and two survived, Mohlin and Arne Thuresson, the ship's second mate.

Mohlin was promoted to major in the Engineer Troops in 1948. At this time, Mohlin also served as military expert in the 1949 Defense Investigation. He served in the General Staff Corps in 1949 and was head of the Organization Department of the Army Staff from 1950 to 1953 where he was promoted to lieutenant colonel in 1952. In 1954 he was appointed commanding officer of the Göta Engineer Corps (Ing 2) and in 1955 he was promoted to colonel in the Engineer Troops.

Mohlin served as commanding officer of Halland Regiment (I 16) from 1957 to 1959 and he was also a member of the 1958 Defense Command Committee. He was then as acting military commander of the VI Military District (Milo VI) from 1959 to 1961 when he was promoted to major general. He then served two years as Chief of the Army Staff and the General Staff Corps before being appointed military commander of the VI Military District in 1963. The VI Military District changed name to Upper Norrland Military District (Milo ÖN) in 1966, the same year as Mohlin was promoted to lieutenant general. Mohlin continued to serve as commanding officer of it until his retirement in 1972.

== Personal life ==
In 1937 he married Martha Uhlin (1914–1995), the daughter of captain Martin Uhlin and Dagmar Kullgren. He was the father of Björn (born 1941), Barbro (born 1943) and Karin (born 1946).

== Death ==
Mohlin died on 2 May 1992 in Täby Parish and was buried on 2 June 1992 at Djursholm Cemetery.

== Dates of rank ==
- 1930 – Second lieutenant
- 1935 – Lieutenant
- 1940 – Captain
- 1948 – Major
- 1952 – Lieutenant colonel
- 1955 – Colonel
- 1961 – Major general
- 1966 – Lieutenant general

== Awards and decorations ==
- (Sweden) Commander Grand Cross of the Order of the Sword (6 June 1968)
- (Sweden) Commander 1st Class of the Order of the Sword (6 June 1961)
- (Sweden) Knight of the Order of Vasa
- (Sweden) Home Guard Medal of Merit in Gold (6 June 1960)

== Honours ==
- Member of the Royal Swedish Academy of War Sciences (1961)

Military offices
Preceded by Gustav Åkerman	Chief of the Army Staff; General Staff Corps; 1961–1963	Succeeded by Stig Synnergren
Preceded by Nils Björk	VI Military District/Upper Norrland Military District; 1963–1972	Succeeded by Nils Personne
