= Karl-Gösta Lundmark =

Swedish Army officer (1919–1995)

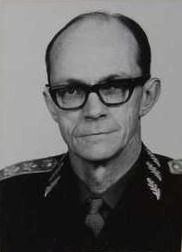
- Born: Karl Gösta Olof Lundmark; 18 January 1919; Överluleå, Sweden
- Died: 16 November 1995 (aged 76); Överluleå, Sweden
- Military career
- Allegiance: Sweden
- Branch: Swedish Army
- Service years: 1943–1980
- Rank: Lieutenant General
- Commands: Chief of Staff, IV. milo; Boden Artillery Regiment; Operations Command 1, Fst; Chief of Staff, Milo B; Chief of Staff, Milo ÖN; Commander, Milo ÖN

Lieutenant General Karl Gösta (Karl-Gösta) Olof Lundmark (18 January 1919 – 16 November 1995) was a senior Swedish Army officer. Lundmark served as chief of staff of the IV Military District (1961–1965), of the Bergslagen Military District (1972–1974) and of the Upper Norrland Military District (1974–1976). He also served as Commanding General of the Upper Norrland Military District (1976–1980).

== Early life ==
Lundmark was born on 18 January 1919 in Överluleå Parish, Boden Municipality, Sweden, the son of Hjalmar Lundmark, a farmer, and his wife Bertha (née Karlsson). He passed studentexamen in Boden in 1940.

== Career ==
Lundmark graduated from the Military Academy Karlberg in 1943 and was commissioned as an officer with the rank of second lieutenant, after which he was promoted to lieutenant in Boden Artillery Regiment in 1945. He attended the Artillery Officers' School at the Artillery and Engineering College from 1947 to 1948 and the Higher Artillery Course there from 1949 to 1951. He was promoted to captain in Boden Artillery Regiment in 1952, and served as a General Staff officer in the staff in IV Military District from 1956 to 1961.

Lundmark was promoted to major in the General Staff Corps in 1961, and was posted as chief of staff in the staff of the IV Military District from 1961 to 1965, and was promoted to lieutenant colonel in 1964 and served in Norrland Artillery Regiment from 1965 to 1966. In 1966, Lundmark was promoted to colonel and appointed regimental commander of Boden Artillery Regiment. Two years later, he was promoted to senior colonel and then served as head of Operations Command 1 in the Defence Staff from 1968 to 1972. Lundmark was then posted as chief of staff in Bergslagen Military District from 1972 to 1974 when he was promoted to major general. He then served as chief of staff in the Upper Norrland Military District from 1974 to 1976. Lundmark was promoted to lieutenant general in 1976 and served as commanding general of the Upper Norrland Military District from 1976 to 1980.

== Personal life ==
In 1945, he married Margareta Malmros (1919–2000), the daughter of train driver Nils Malmros and Hilda (née Höög). They had one child: Lars (born 1950).

Lundmark lived in Svartlå.

== Death ==
Lundmark died on 16 November 1995 in Överluleå Parish, Boden Municipality, Sweden.

== Dates of rank ==
- 1943 – Second lieutenant
- 1945 – Lieutenant
- 1952 – Captain
- 1961 – Major
- 1964 – Lieutenant colonel
- 1966 – Colonel
- 1968 – Senior colonel
- 1974 – Major general
- 1976 – Lieutenant general

== Awards and decorations ==
- (Sweden) Commander 1st Class of the Order of the Sword (11 November 1972)
- (Sweden) Commander of the Order of the Sword (17 November 1969)
- (Sweden) Knight 1st Class of the Order of the Sword (1962)

Military offices
Preceded by Stig Waldenström	Chief of Staff of the IV Military District; 1961–1965	Succeeded by Bengt Lundvall
Preceded by Olof von Sydow	Boden Artillery Regiment; 1966–1968	Succeeded by Bengt Liljestrand
Preceded by Jan-Henrik Torselius	Operations Command 1, Defence Staff; 1968–1972	Succeeded by Carl-Ivar Lindgren
Preceded by Gunnar Nordlöf	Chief of Staff of the Bergslagen Military District; 1972–1974	Succeeded by Sven Werner
Preceded by Gösta Hökmark	Chief of Staff of the Upper Norrland Military District; 1974–1976	Succeeded by Bengt Schuback
Preceded by Nils Personne	Commanding General, Upper Norrland Military District; 1976–1980	Succeeded by Erik G. Bengtsson
