= Gösta Hökmark =

Swedish Army officer

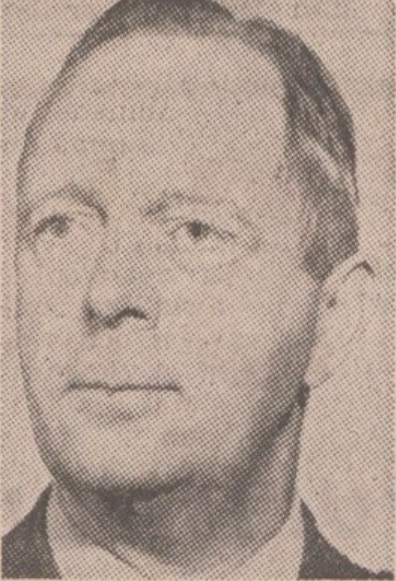
- Born: Anders Gösta Hökmark; 14 June 1920; Malmö, Sweden
- Died: 15 April 1993 (aged 72); Förslöv, Sweden
- Relatives: Gunnar Hökmark (son)
- Military career
- Allegiance: Sweden
- Branch: Swedish Army
- Service years: 1942–1983
- Rank: Major General
- Commands: South Scanian Regiment; Chief of Staff, Milo ÖN; Chief of the Army Staff; General Staff Corps; Bergslagen Military District

Major General Anders Gösta Hökmark (14 June 1920 – 15 April 1993) was a Swedish Army officer. His senior commands include postings as Chief of the Army Staff and the General Staff Corps (1976–1979) and military commander of Bergslagen Military District (1979–1983).

== Early life ==
Hökmark was born on 14 June 1920 in Malmö Karoli Parish, Malmöhus County, the son of Anders Persson, a merchant, and his wife Clara (née Ahlgren).

== Career ==
Hökmark enrolled at the Military Academy Karlberg in Stockholm in 1940. He attended the same class as the future Major General Carl-Gustaf Ståhl. He graduated in 1942 and was commissioned as an officer the same year and was assigned as a second lieutenant to the South Scanian Infantry Regiment (I 7) in Ystad. He was promoted to lieutenant in 1942 and attended the Royal Swedish Army Staff College from 1949 to 1951. Hökmark was promoted to captain in 1952 and was an Aspirant in the General Staff Corps from 1953 to 1956 when he became a General Staff Corps officer. From 1959 to 1960, Hökmark served as a company commander in the Swedish UN battalion, part of the United Nations Emergency Force (UNEF), in Gaza.

Hökmark was promoted to major in Norrbotten Regiment in 1961 and served as Deputy Secretary in the 1960 Defense Management Investigation (1960 års försvarsledningsutredning) from 1961 to 1963. He was promoted to lieutenant colonel in 1964 and was head of the General Department (Allmänna avdelningen) in the Defence Staff from 1963 to 1966 and expert in the 1964 Fortification Investigation (1964 års fortifikationsutredning) from 1964 to 1965. Hökmark was then lieutenant colonel in the South Scanian Regiment in 1966 and was promoted to colonel in 1968 and appointed regimental commander of the South Scanian Regiment. In 1972, Hökmark was promoted to major general and appointed Chief of Staff of the Upper Norrland Military District. Hökmark served as Acting Chief of the Army Staff and of the General Staff Corps from 1973 to 1976 and as Chief of the Army Staff and of the General Staff Corps in 1976. Hökmark's last post was as military commander of the Bergslagen Military District from 1979 to 1983.

== Personal life ==
In 1943 he married Anne-Marie Forneborg (1919–1986), the daughter of Johan Forneborg and Manny (née Danielsson). They had three children, Gunnar Hökmark, Harald Hökmark and Kåre Hökmark.

== Death ==
Hökmark died on 15 April 1993 in Förslöv Parish, Kristianstad County. He was interred on 15 May 1993 at Förslöv Cemetery.

== Dates of rank ==
- 1942 – Second lieutenant
- 1944 – Lieutenant
- 1952 – Captain
- 1961 – Major
- 1966 – Lieutenant colonel
- 1968 – Colonel
- 1972 – Major general

== Awards and decorations ==
- (Sweden) Commander 1st Class of the Order of the Sword (6 June 1974)
- (Sweden) Commander Order of the Sword (6 June 1972)
- (Sweden) Knight 1st Class of the Order of the Sword (1961)

== Honours ==
- Member of the Royal Swedish Academy of War Sciences (1974)

== Bibliography ==
- Hökmark, Gösta, ed. (1988). Södra skåningarna etthundra år på Revingehed: [en minnesskrift] (in Swedish). Ystad: Fören. SELIBR 811279.

Military offices
Preceded by Nils Personne	Chief of Staff of the Upper Norrland Military District; 1972–1974	Succeeded by Karl-Gösta Lundmark
Preceded by Lennart Ljung	Acting Chief of the Army Staff General Staff Corps; 1973–1976	Succeeded by Himself
Preceded by Himself	Chief of the Army Staff General Staff Corps; 1976–1979	Succeeded by Robert Lugn
Preceded by Sigmund Ahnfelt	Bergslagen Military District; 1979–1983	Succeeded by Bengt Tamfeldt
