= Swedish Air Force Volunteers Association Merit Badge =

- Awarded for: Recognition of efforts that have benefited the FVRF or its interests.
- Country: Sweden
- Presented by: Swedish Air Force Volunteers Association
- Eligibility: Swedish and foreign personnel
- Status: Currently awarded
- Established: 1986
- First award: 24–25 January 1987
- Ribbon bar

The Swedish Air Force Volunteers Association Merit Badge (Swedish: Flygvapenföreningarnas riksförbunds förtjänsttecken or Flygvapenfrivilligas förtjänsttecken, FVRFGFt) is a Swedish merit badge established in 1986 by the Swedish Air Force Volunteers Association (FVRF). Its awarded in recognition of efforts that have benefited the FVRF or its interests.

== History ==
The Swedish Air Force Volunteers Association Merit Badge was established in 1986. The merit badge was awarded for the first time at FVRF's 25th anniversary at the meeting in Linköping on 24–25 January 1987 by the chairman Gunnar Löfström.

== Appearance ==
=== Badge ===
The badge is of the 8th size and oval in shape. The obverse shows a fire beacon and above it a winged propeller.

=== Ribbon ===
The ribbon is of red moiré pattern with a blue stripe on the middle.

== Criteria ==
Has benefited FVRF interests for at least 3 years.

== Presenting ==
The merit badge is awarded to Swedish or foreign citizens who have benefited the FVRF through personal efforts. The merit badge is usually awarded for at least 3 years of meritorious work within the voluntary defense area of activity or other meritorious contribution to the benefit of FVRF's activities. The merit badge can also be awarded to those who have previously received the Swedish Air Force Volunteers Association Medal of Merit. A maximum of 30 merit badges should be awarded annually. However, this number may be exceeded if there are special reasons. The right to make proposals regarding the awarding of a medal of merit belongs to a member of the medal committee and to the board of the affiliated union or association. Merit badges are usually awarded at regional/local meetings.

== See also ==
- Swedish Air Force Volunteers Association Medal of Merit
