= Swedish Air Force Volunteers Association =

Voluntary aviation auxiliary of the Swedish Air Force

Arms of the Swedish Air Force Volunteers Association

The Swedish Air Force Volunteers Association (Swedish: Flygvapenfrivilligas riksförbund, FVRF), commonly known as the Air Force Volunteers (Swedish: Flygvapenfrivilliga) is a Swedish voluntary defence organization (an aviation auxiliary) formed in 1962 for both men and women according to the ordinance on voluntary defence activities - whose activities are to serve the Swedish Armed Forces and society's other crisis preparedness. It includes i.a. defence information as well as recruitment and training of voluntary defence organization personnel and youths.

== History ==
Today's association was established in 1962 through the Swedish Association of Voluntary Observers (Sveriges luftbevakningsförbund, SLBF) which formed in 1955. During the 1950s, the Swedish Air Force was expanded and there was a need for volunteers also in the air base service. Therefore, the name was changed in 1962 to the National Federation of Swedish Air Force Associations (Flygvapenföreningarnas riksförbund). In 1992, the additional name Flygvapenfrivilliga ("Air Force Volunteers") was adopted, to indicate that it was the largest voluntary organization with information for the Air Force and partly through the name, to more easily market the organization and its task. In 2000, the official name was changed to the Flygvapenfrivilligas Riksförbund, still using the additional name Flygvapenfrivilliga.

== Tasks ==
The tasks of the Air Force Volunteers are:

- To provide voluntary defence organization personnel, placed and serving within the Swedish Air Force and Air Force forces' military units as well as basic organization, training to and in their position and tasks.
- To provide voluntary defence organization personnel, placed in the Home Guard's units, training to and in their position and tasks.
- To provide voluntary defence organization personnel, training to be able to constitute a reinforcement resource for society's crisis preparedness.
- To provide personnel belonging to other voluntary defence organizations, or equivalent, training in their position and task.
- To promote interest in and knowledge of the Air Force Volunteers, the Swedish Air Force and the rest of the Swedish Armed Forces.

Air Force Volunteers are politically and religiously independent and follow the Swedish Armed Forces' values. Air Force Volunteers mainly collaborate with units and schools within the Swedish Air Force. In other respects, there is collaboration with the Swedish Armed Forces, other voluntary defence organizations and other organizations whose activities are related to the tasks of the Swedish Air Force.

== Organization ==
The Air Force Volunteers is an association of national Air Force Volunteer regions with associated sub-units and specialist association. The Air Force Volunteers are part of the central voluntary organizations' contact network for collaboration, the FOS.

== Awards and decorations ==
The Swedish Air Force Volunteers Association awards the Swedish Air Force Volunteers Association Medal of Merit in gold and silver for exceptionally meritorious work within the association's area of activity since 1964. The Swedish Air Force Volunteers Association Merit Badge is awarded since 1986.
