= Upper Norrland Military District =

Former Sweden military establishment

- Övre Norrlands militärområde
- Active: 1942–1993
- Country: Sweden
- Allegiance: Swedish Armed Forces
- Branch: Multi (Sea, Air and Land)
- Type: Military district
- Role: Operational, territorial and tactical operations
- Garrison/HQ: Boden

Upper Norrland Military District (Swedish: Övre Norrlands militärområde, Milo ÖN), originally VI Military District (Swedish: VI. militärområdet) was a Swedish military district, a command of the Swedish Armed Forces that had operational control over Upper Norrland, for most time of its existence corresponding to the area covered by the counties of Västerbotten and Norrbotten. The headquarters of Milo ÖN were located in Boden.

== History ==
Milo ÖN was created in 1966 along with five other military districts as part of a reorganisation of the administrative divisions of the Swedish Armed Forces. It can be seen as the successor of VI Military District (VI. militärområdet) created in 1942, but that did not have the same tasks as Milo ÖN. The military district consisted of the land covered by the above-mentioned counties. In 1993, the number of military districts of Sweden was decreased to three, and as a consequence of that, Milo ÖN was merged with the Lower Norrland Military District (Milo NN) to create a new military district, the Northern Military District (Milo N).

== Units 1989 ==
In peacetime the Upper Norrland Military District consisted of the following units, which were training recruits for wartime units:

- Upper Norrland Military District (Milo ÖN), in Boden
  - Army units:
    - K 4 - Norrland Dragoon Regiment, in Arvidsjaur, training Norrlandsjägare ("Norrland Rangers")
    - I 19/P 5 - Norrbotten Regiment with Norrbotten Armoured Battalion, in Boden
    - I 20/Fo 61 - Västerbotten Regiment / Västerbotten Defense District in Umeå
    - I 22/Fo 66 - Lapland Ranger Regiment / Kiruna Defense District, in Kiruna
    - A 8/Fo 63 - Boden Artillery Regiment / Boden Defense District, in Boden
    - Ing 3 - Boden Engineer Regiment, in Boden
    - S 3 - Norrland Signal Regiment, in Boden
    - Lv 7 - Luleå Air Defence Regiment, in Luleå
    - AF 1 - Norrbotten Army Aviation Battalion, at Boden Helicopter Airfield, with Bell 204C and Bell 206A utility helicopters, and one squadron of 10x Bo 105CB3 anti-tank helicopters
    - Fo 67 - Kalix Defense District, in Kalix
    - Boden Fortress
  - Air Force units:
    - F 21/Se ÖN - Norrbotten Wing / Air Defense Sector Upper Norrland, in Luleå
      - 211th Recce Squadron, with SF 37 Viggen photo reconnaissance aircraft and SH 37 Viggen maritime reconnaissance/strike aircraft
      - 212th Fighter Squadron, with JA 37 Viggen fighter aircraft
      - 213th Fighter Squadron, with JA 37 Viggen fighter aircraft

In wartime the Upper Norrland Military District would have activated the following major land units, as well as a host of smaller units:

- 15th Division, in Boden
  - NB 19 - Norrbotten Brigade, a Type 85 Norrland Brigade (optimized for arctic/winter warfare) based on the I 19/P 5 - Norrbotten Regiment
  - NB 50 - Lapland Brigade, a Type 85 Norrland Brigade based on the I 20 - Västerbotten Regiment
  - 8x Norrland Jäger battalions
  - 3x Self-propelled Artillery Battalions, with 8x Bandkanon 1 each

== Heraldry and traditions ==
=== Coat of arms ===
The coat of arms of the Upper Norrland Military District Staff 1983–1993. Blazon: "Azur, an erect sword with the district letter (ÖN - Upper Norrland) surrounded by an open chaplet of oak leaves, all or."

== Commanding officers ==
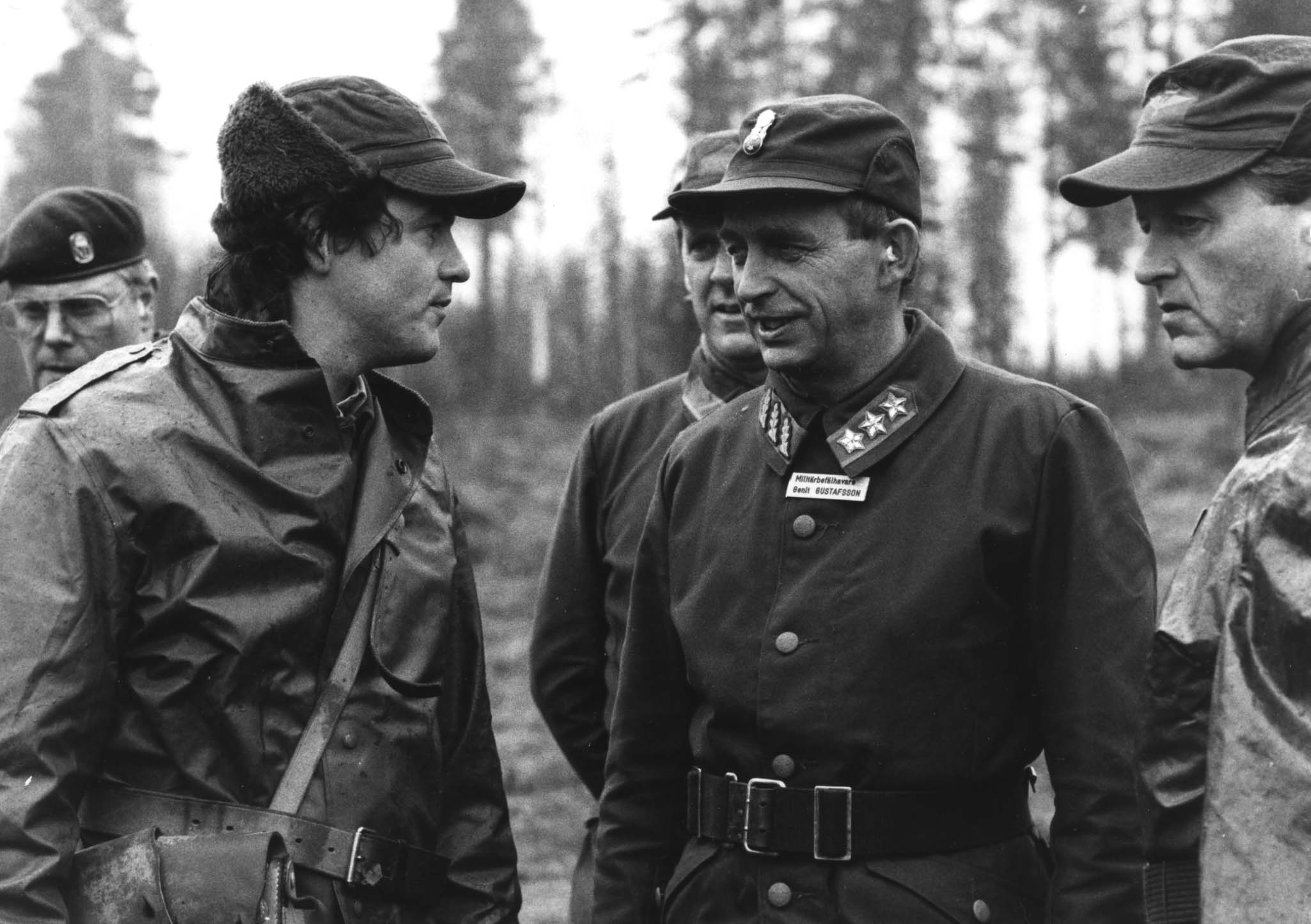
Lieutenant general Bengt Gustafsson as commander (1984–1986).

=== Military commanders ===
- 1942–1946: Nils Rosenblad
- 1946–1951: Sven Colliander
- 1951–1963: Nils Björk
- 1963–1963: Karl Gustaf Brandberg (acting)
- 1963–1972: Arne Mohlin
- 1972–1976: Nils Personne
- 1976–1980: Karl-Gösta Lundmark
- 1980–1984: Erik G. Bengtsson
- 1984–1986: Bengt Gustafsson
- 1986–1988: Lars-Erik Englund
- 1988–1990: Åke Sagrén
- 1990–1992: Curt Sjöö
- 1992–1993: Carl-Ivar Pesula

=== Chiefs of Staff ===
- 1942–1944: Holger Stenholm
- 1944–1948: Arne Hallström
- 1948–1949: Sten Langéen
- 1949–1954: Carl Gustaf Dahlberg
- 1954–1958: Bror von Vegesack
- 1958–1963: Gunnar Henricson
- 1963–1966: Bele Jansson
- 1966–1972: Nils Personne
- 1972–1974: Gösta Hökmark
- 1974–1976: Karl-Gösta Lundmark
- 1976–1977: Bengt Schuback
- 1977–1978: Erik Nygren
- 1978–1980: Evert Båge
- 1980–1983: Bertil Nordström
- 1983–1986: Lars-Erik Englund
- 1986–1988: Åke Sagrén
- 1988–1992: Carl-Johan Rundberg
- 1992–1993: Tomas Warming

== Names, designations and locations ==
Name	Translation	From		To
VI. militärområdet	VI Military District	1942-10-01	–	1966-09-30
Upper Norrland Military District	Övre Norrlands militärområde	1966-10-01	–	1993-06-30
Designation		From		To
VI. Milo		1943-10-01	–	1966-09-30
Milo ÖN		1966-10-01	–	1993-06-30
Location		From		To
Boden Garrison		1943-10-01	–	1993-06-30

== See also ==
- Military district (Sweden)
