= Eastern Military District (Sweden) =

Former military unit

- Östra militärområdet
- Active: 1942–1991
- Country: Sweden
- Allegiance: Swedish Armed Forces
- Branch: Multi (Sea, Air and Land)
- Type: Military district
- Role: Operational, territorial and tactical operations
- Garrison/HQ: Strängnäs

Insignia
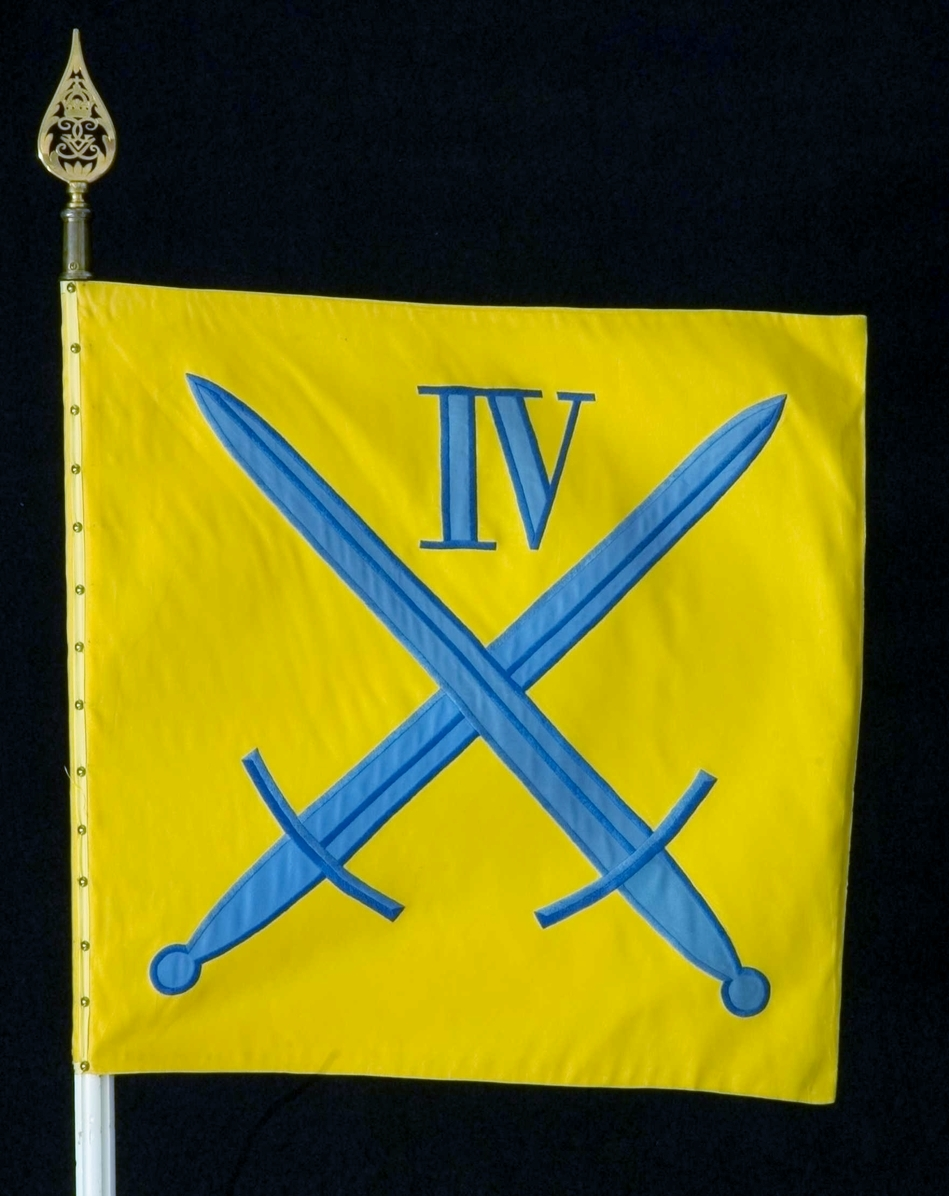
- Command flag

Eastern Military District (Swedish: Östra militärområdet, Milo Ö), originally IV Military District (Swedish: IV. militärområdet) was a Swedish military district, a command of the Swedish Armed Forces that had operational control over Eastern Sweden, for most time of its existence corresponding to the area covered by the counties of Östergötland, Södermanland, Stockholm, Uppsala and Västmanland. The headquarters of Milo Ö were located in Strängnäs.

== History ==
Milo Ö was created in 1966 along with five other military districts as part of a reorganisation of the administrative divisions of the Swedish Armed Forces. It can be seen as the successor of IV Military District (IV. militärområdet) created in 1942, but that did not have the same tasks as Milo Ö. The military area consisted of the land covered by the above-mentioned counties, and from the creation to 1982, also the southern part of Gävleborg County. In 1991, the number of military districts of Sweden was decreased to five, and as a consequence of that, Milo Ö was merged with Bergslagen Military District (Milo B) to create a new military district, Middle Military District (Milo M).

== Heraldry and traditions ==
=== Coat of arms ===
The coat of arms of the Eastern Military District Staff 1983–1991. Blazon: "Azur, an erect sword with the area letter (Ö - East) surrounded by an open chaplet of oak leaves, all or."

== Commanding officers ==
=== Military commanders ===
- 1942–1943: Erik Testrup (also Commandant General)
- 1943–1944: Helge Jung (also Commandant General)
- 1944–1944: Axel Rappe (also Commandant General) (Note: Rappe was appointed on 21 February 1944 and was supposed to take command on 1 April 1944. However, the nomination was recalled, most likely to keep Rappe on the post as commanding officer of the I Army Corps (Första armékåren).)
- 1944–1945: Arvid Moberg (acting military commander and Commandant General)
- 1945–1957: Gustaf Dyrssen (also Commandant General)
- 1957–1961: Bert Carpelan (also Commandant General)
- 1961–1967: Gustav Åkerman (also Commandant General until 1966)
- 1967–1969: Carl Eric Almgren (also Commandant General)
- 1969–1974: Ove Ljung (also Commandant General)
- 1974–1976: Nils Sköld (also Commandant General)
- 1976–1982: Gunnar Eklund (also Commandant General)
- 1982–1988: Bengt Lehander (also Commandant General)
- 1988–1991: Bror Stefenson (also Commandant General)

=== Deputy military commanders ===
- 1942–1945: Arvid Moberg
- 1945–1953: Pehr Janse
- 1953–1955: Sven Erhard Öberg
- 1955–1959: Hadar Cars
- 1959–1963: Bengt Brusewitz
- 1963–1967: Carl A:son Klingenstierna

=== Chiefs of Staff ===
- 1942–1946: Gunnar af Klintberg
- 1946–1949: Carl-Johan Wachtmeister
- 1949–1952: Per Tamm
- 1952–1955: Carl Eric Svärd
- 1955–1957: Åke Wahlgren
- 1957–1959: Jan-Erik Vilhelm Landin
- 1959–1960: Bengt Liljestrand
- 1960–1961: Stig Waldenström
- 1961–1965: Karl-Gösta Lundmark
- 1966–1970: Bengt Lundvall
- 1970–1973: Hans Neij
- 1973–1978: Nils-Fredrik Palmstierna
- 1978–1980: Erik G. Bengtsson
- 1980–1984: Gustaf Welin
- 1984–1985: Roland Grahn
- 1985–1990: Jörn Beckmann
- 1990–1991: Bengt Anderberg

== Names, designations and locations ==
Name	Translation	From		To
IV. militärområdet	IV Military District	1942-10-01	–	1966-09-30
Östra militärområdet	Eastern Military District	1966-10-01	–	1991-06-30
Designation		From		To
IV. Milo		1942-10-01	–	1966-09-30
Milo Ö		1966-10-01	–	1991-06-30
Location		From		To
Stockholm Garrison		1942-10-01	–	1963-06-11
Strängnäs Garrison		1963-06-12	–	1991-06-30

== See also ==
- Military district (Sweden)
