= Swedish Air Force Volunteers Association Medal of Merit =

- Type: Semi-official medal (Note: Category K of semi-official medals include, with His Majesty the King's permission established and with his approval, medals (badges) awarded by various organizations. The medals has often the king's image on the obverse.)
- Awarded for: Exceptionally meritorious work within the association's area of activity
- Country: Sweden
- Presented by: Swedish Air Force Volunteers Association
- Eligibility: Swedish and foreign personnel
- Status: Currently awarded
- Established: 1964
- Ribbon bar

The Swedish Air Force Volunteers Association Medal of Merit (Swedish: Flygvapenföreningarnas riksförbunds förtjänstmedalj or Flygvapenfrivilligas förtjänstmedalj (Note: Abbreviated FVRFgm/sm until 1991 and FVRFGM/SM since 1991.)) is a Swedish reward medal established in 1962 by the Swedish Air Force Volunteers Association. The medal is awarded for exceptionally meritorious work within the association's area of activity.

== History ==
By unanimous decision of the Swedish Association of Voluntary Observers (Sveriges luftbevakningsförbund, SLBF) last general meeting on 25 November 1962 and the Swedish Air Force Volunteers Association (FVRF) first regular meeting on the same day it has been determined that the Swedish Association of Voluntary Observers Medal of Merit (Sveriges Luftbevakningsförbunds förtjänstmedalj, SvLbevM), which was established on 6 May 1956, in the future and after some re-embossing, would also be the Swedish Air Force Volunteers Association Merit Medal (Flygvapenföreningarnas riksförbunds förtjänstmedalj, FVRFgm/sm). This new medal was awarded from 1964. After gracious authorization by His Majesty the King and a decision made by the assembly, the medal of merit was granted royal status in 1992 and received a new design. The new medal regulations were appended to the National Federation Board's instructions for 1992/93. The distribution of the new medal took place for the first time at the anniversary assembly in March 1992. The medal is today awarded with His Majesty the King's gracious authorization for exceptionally meritorious work within the association's area of activity.

== Appearance ==
=== Medal ===
The medal, which is of the 8th size, is provided with a royal crown, and is round and 31 mm wide. The obverse shows His Majesty the King's picture in the left profile. The reverse shows a fire beacon and above it a winged propeller, stock twigs and around the edge the inscription 'FLYFVAPENFÖRENINGARNA RIKSFÖRBUND'. The design of the medal was changed in 1991.

=== Ribbon ===
The ribbon is of red moiré pattern with two blue stripes on each side.

== Criteria ==
=== Gold medal ===
The gold medal is awarded to those who have achieved particularly fruitful results for FVRF. Usually awarded at the earliest after 20 years of operation. Should have previously received the Swedish Air Force Volunteers Association Medal of Merit in silver.

=== Silver medal ===
The silver medal is awarded to those who have particularly benefited the Swedish Air Force Volunteers Association's interests for at least 10 years. Usually awarded no earlier than three years after the Swedish Air Force Volunteers Association Merit Badge.

== Presenting ==
The Swedish Air Force Volunteers Association Medal of Merit is awarded in gold and silver. The medal is awarded to Swedish or foreign citizens who, through personal efforts, have particularly benefited the association. The gold medal is usually awarded for long-term activities that have given particularly fruitful results and should normally only be awarded to people who have previously received the silver medal. The silver medal is usually awarded for long-term dedicated work.

A maximum of 12 medals should be awarded annually within the Swedish Air Force Volunteers Association, of which a maximum of 3 gold medals. However, this number may be exceeded if there are special reasons. As a rule, the gold medal is awarded only after 20 years, and the silver medal only after 10 years of activity. If the person in question has received the Swedish Air Force Volunteers Association Merit Badge, the silver medal is normally awarded no earlier than 3 years thereafter. The right to make proposals regarding the awarding of a medal of merit belongs to a member of the medal committee and to the board of the affiliated union or association. Medals of merit are usually awarded by the chairman of the Swedish Air Force Volunteers Association at the FVRF's national general meeting or otherwise, with his consent, at another solemn occasion.

== See also ==
- Swedish Air Force Volunteers Association Merit Badge
