= Överstelöjtnant =

Swedish military rank OF-4

Lieutenant Colonel Överstelöjtnant
- Country: Sweden
- Service branch: Army; Air Force; Navy (Amphibious Corps)
- Abbreviation: Övlt (Swedish), LtCol (English)
- Rank: Lieutenant colonel
- NATO rank code: OF-4
- Non-NATO rank: O-5
- Next higher rank: Colonel
- Next lower rank: Major
- Equivalent ranks: Commander

Lieutenant colonel (LtCol) (Swedish: Överstelöjtnant, Övlt) is a field grade officer rank in the Swedish Armed Forces, just above the rank of major and just below the rank of colonel. It is equivalent to the naval rank of commander in the Swedish Navy.

== History ==
Lieutenant colonel denotes the closest below the colonel's regimental officer rank. The term is almost as old as colonel and initially referred to his closest aides. Nowadays, the lieutenant colonel in a regiment in most armies has become the colonel's closest assistant. In Sweden, in peacetime he is sometimes battalion commander; in war as well as during major troop exercises he often commands regiments.

Lieutenant colonels serves as commanding officer of a battalion or second-in-command of a brigade. As staff officers, lieutenant colonels serves as section heads, heads of function or qualified staff officer. Lieutenant colonels belong to skill levels C (Advanced) or D (Expert).

== Rank insignia ==
=== Collar patches ===
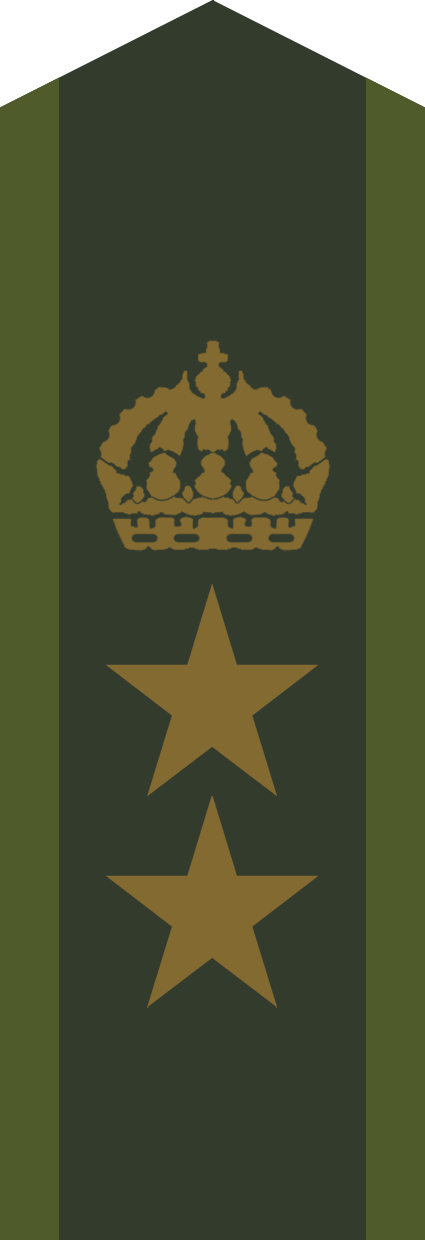
Collar patch m/58 for a lieutenant colonel

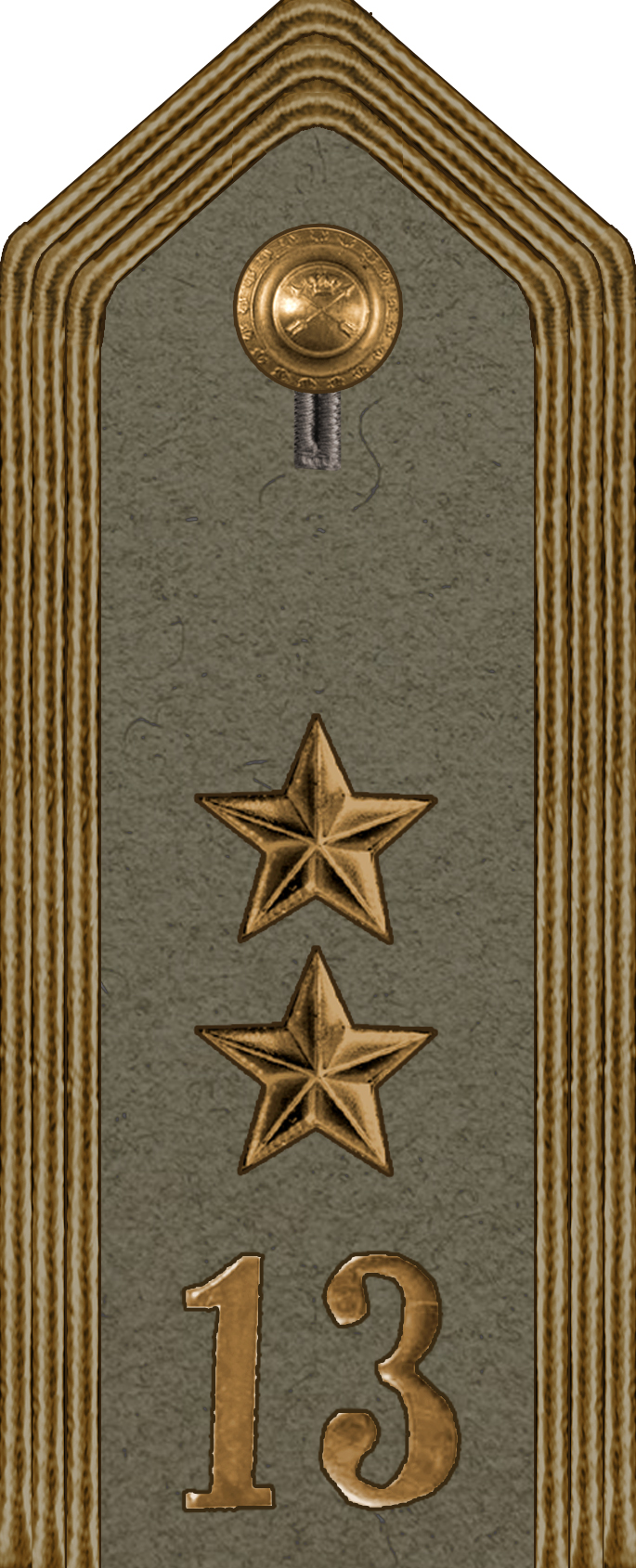
Collar patch

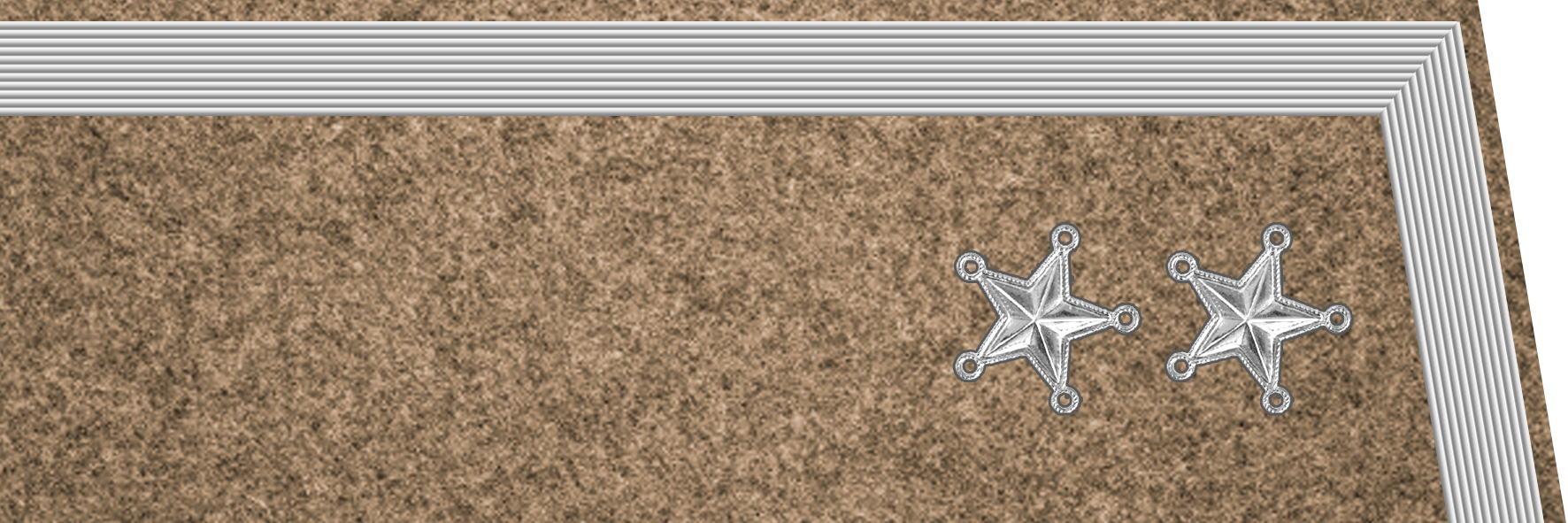
Collar patch

=== Shoulder marks ===
==== Air Force ====
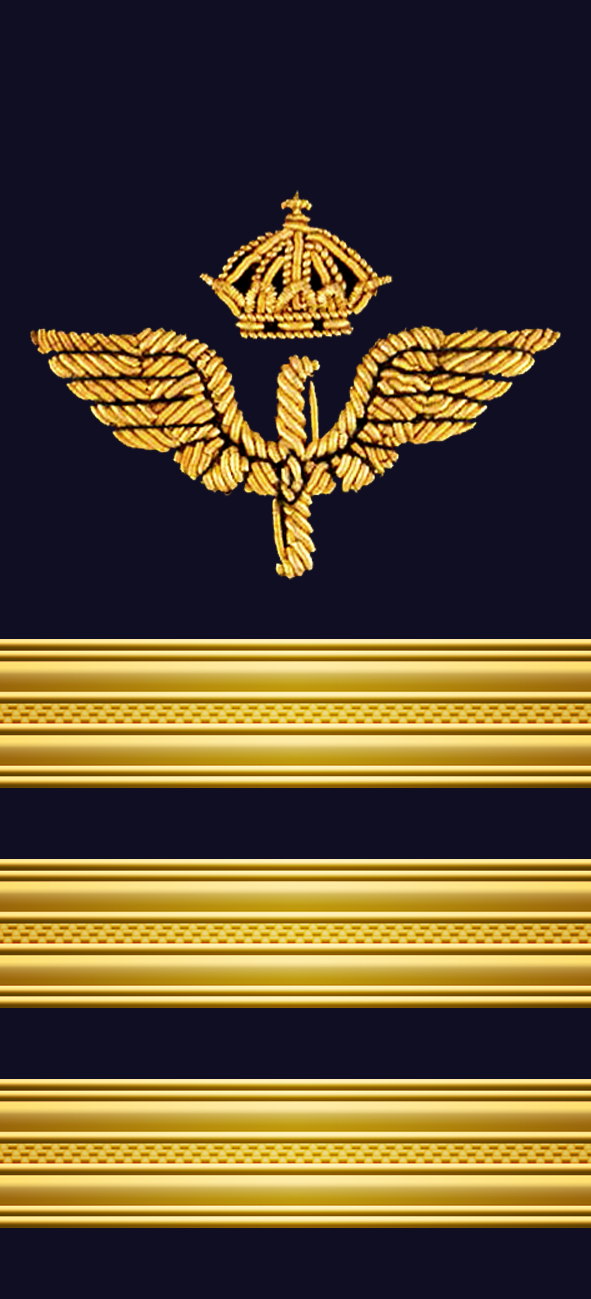
(2003–present)

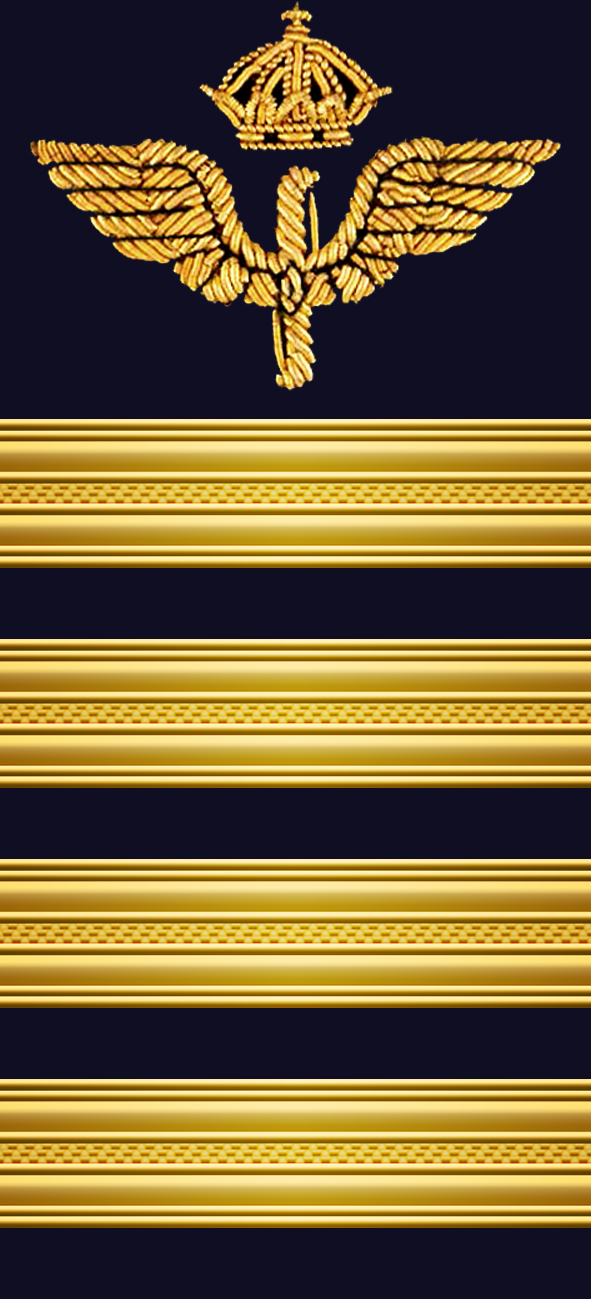
(–2003)

==== Army ====
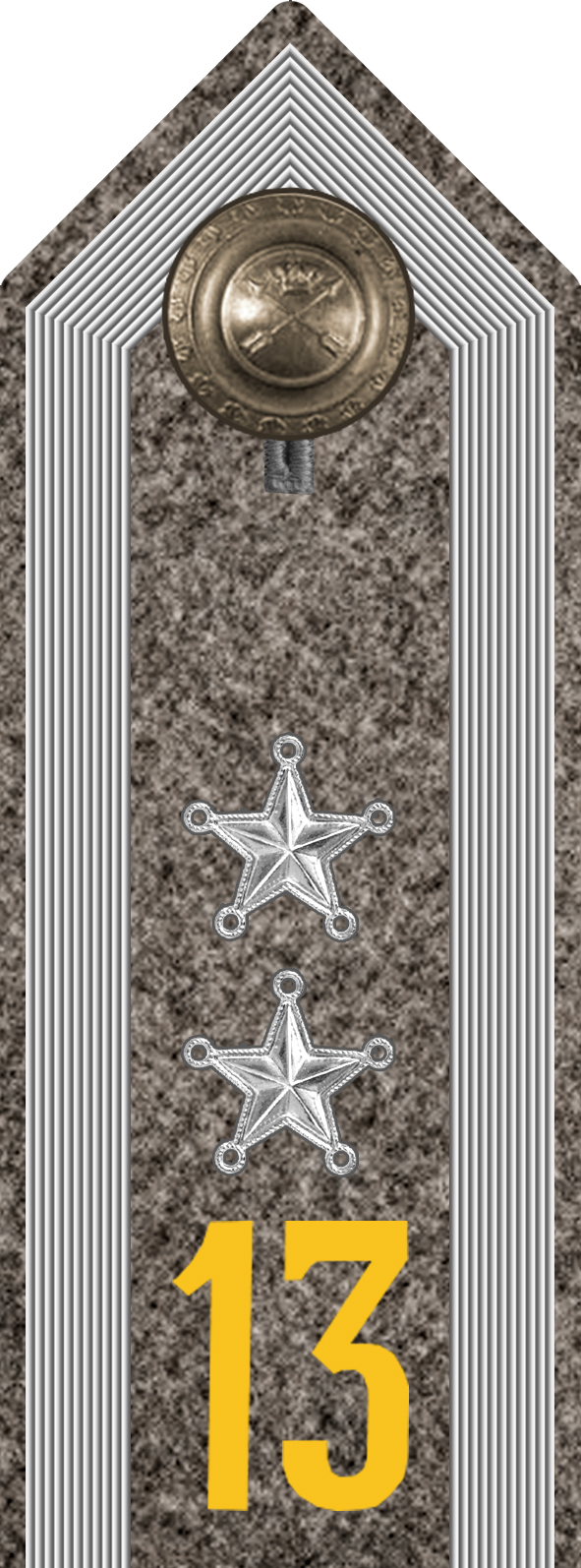
Shoulder mark m/1923
(13 = Dalarna Regiment)

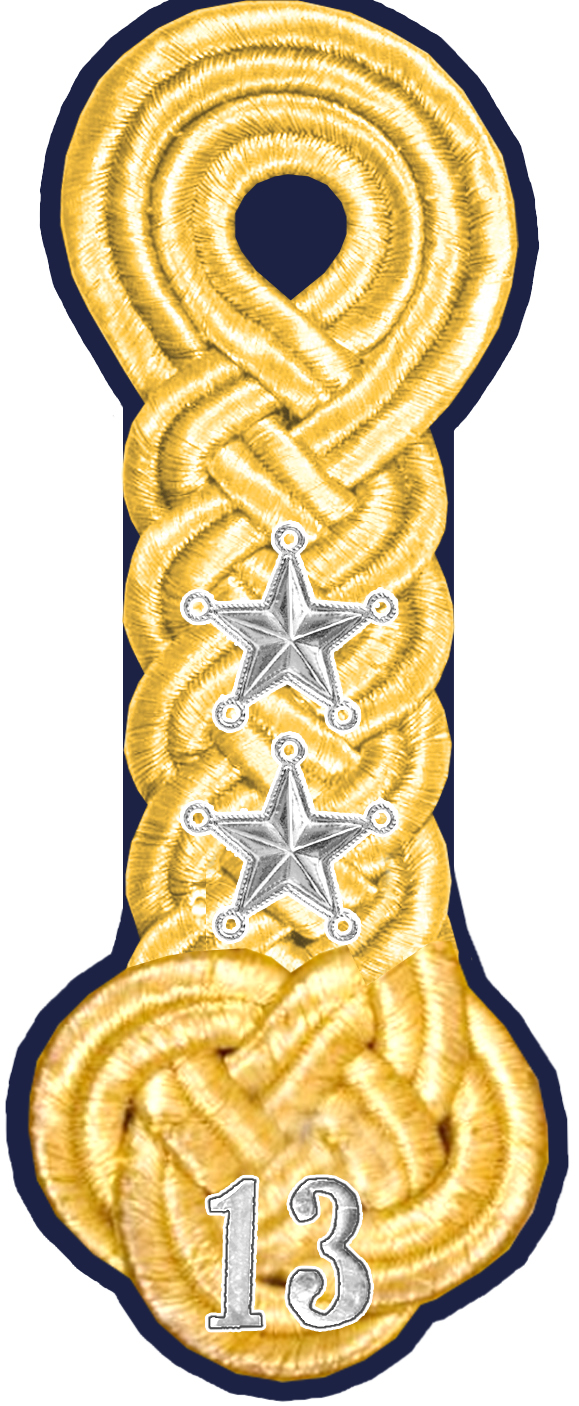
Shoulder mark m/1910
(13 = Dalarna Regiment)

==== Navy (Amphibious Corps) ====
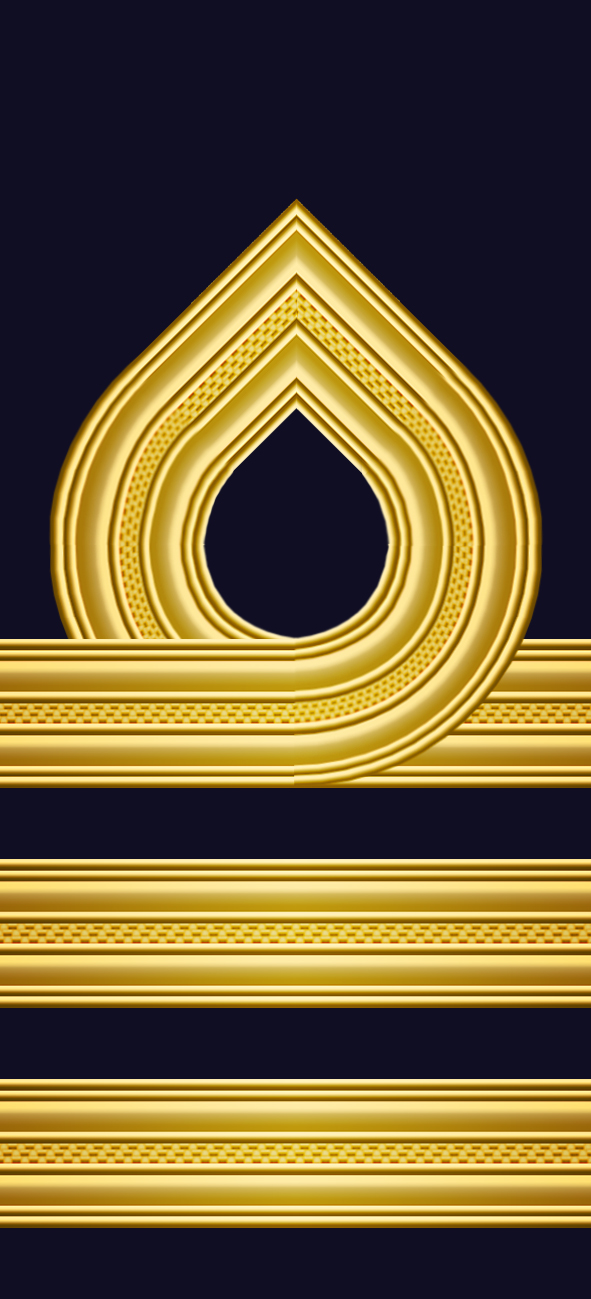
Embroidered shoulder mark (Navy)
(2003–present)

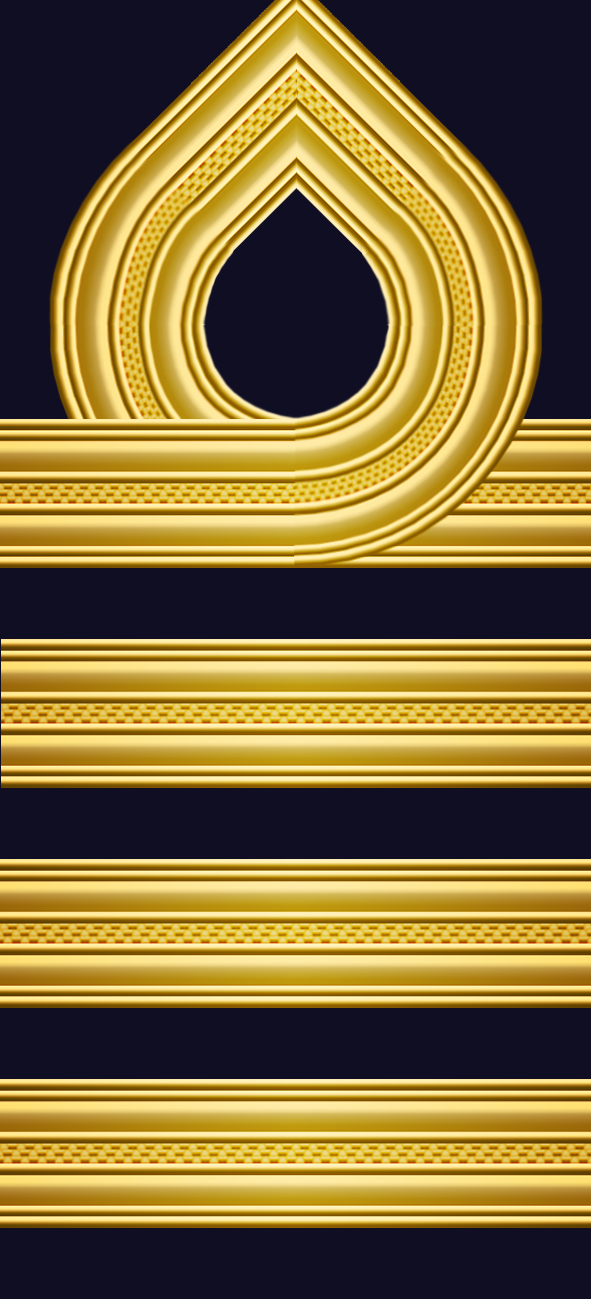
Embroidered shoulder mark (Navy)
(–2003)

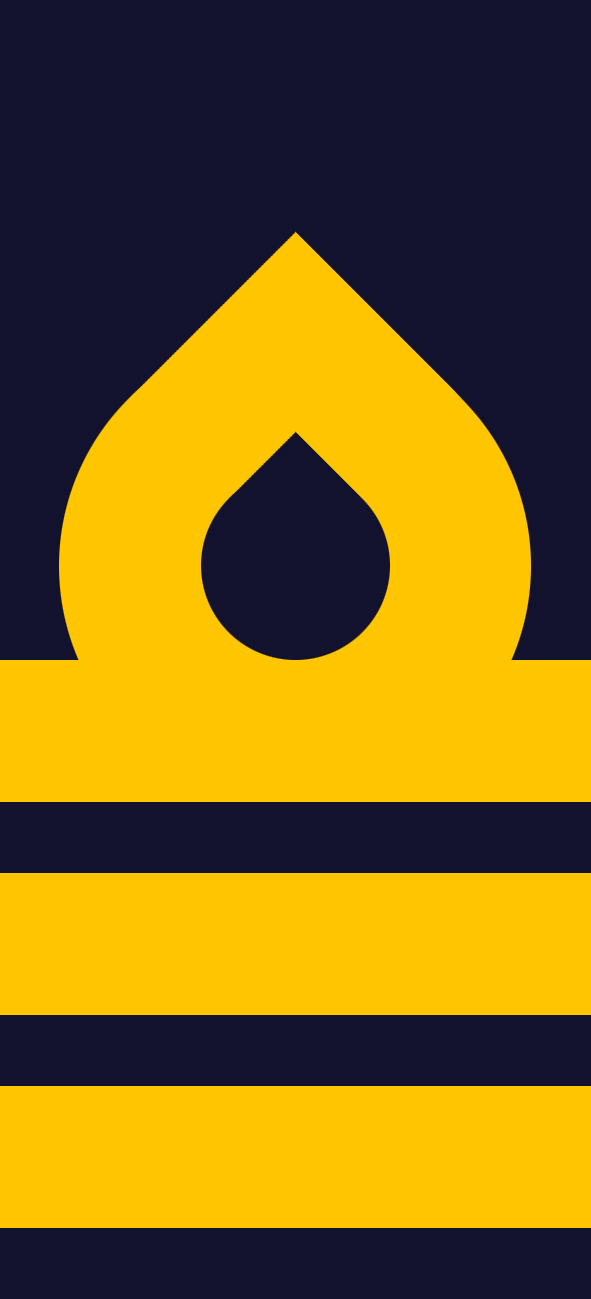
Woven shoulder mark (2003–present)

=== Sleeve insignias ===
==== Air Force ====
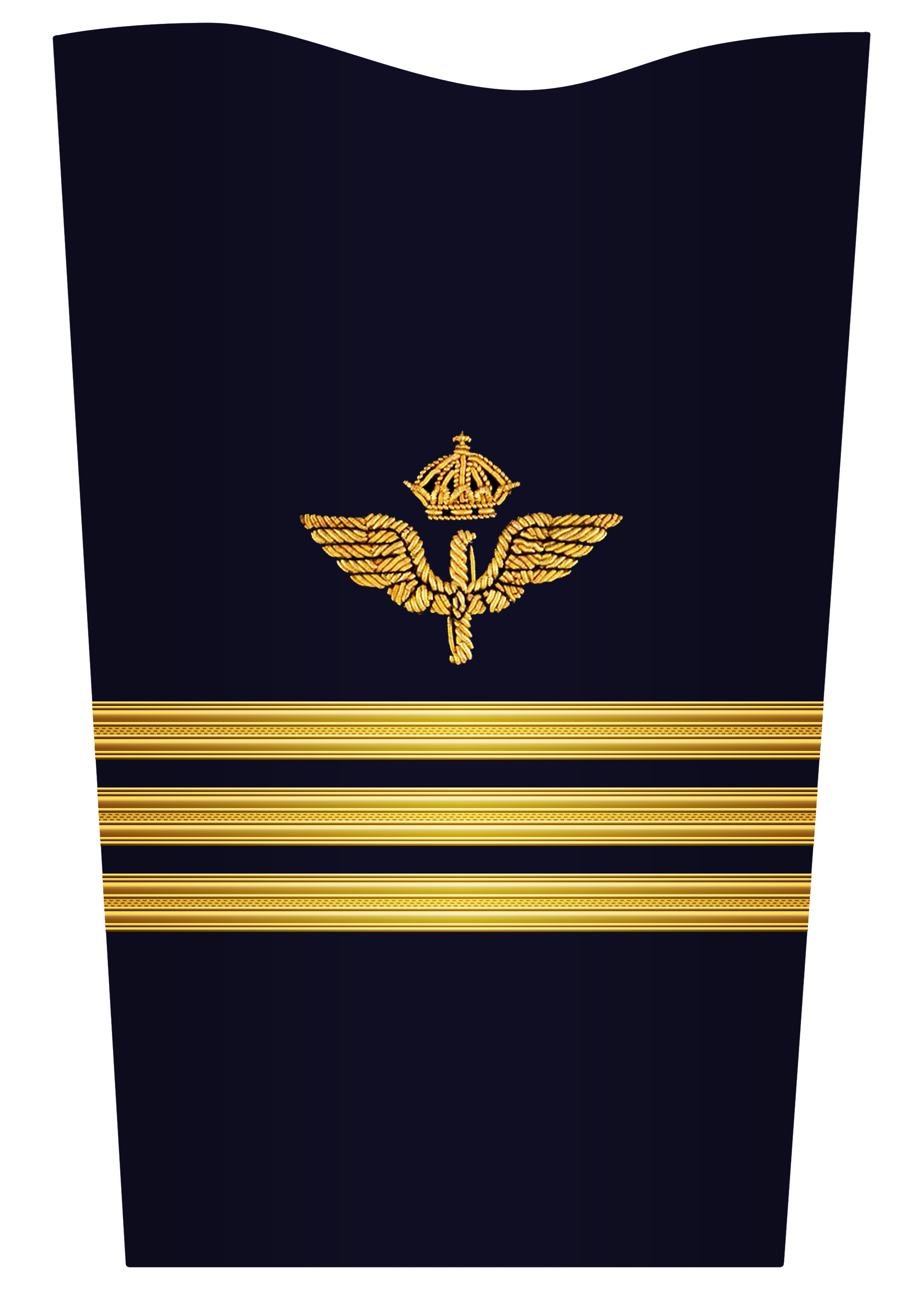
Mess jacket sleeve insignia for a lieutenant colonel

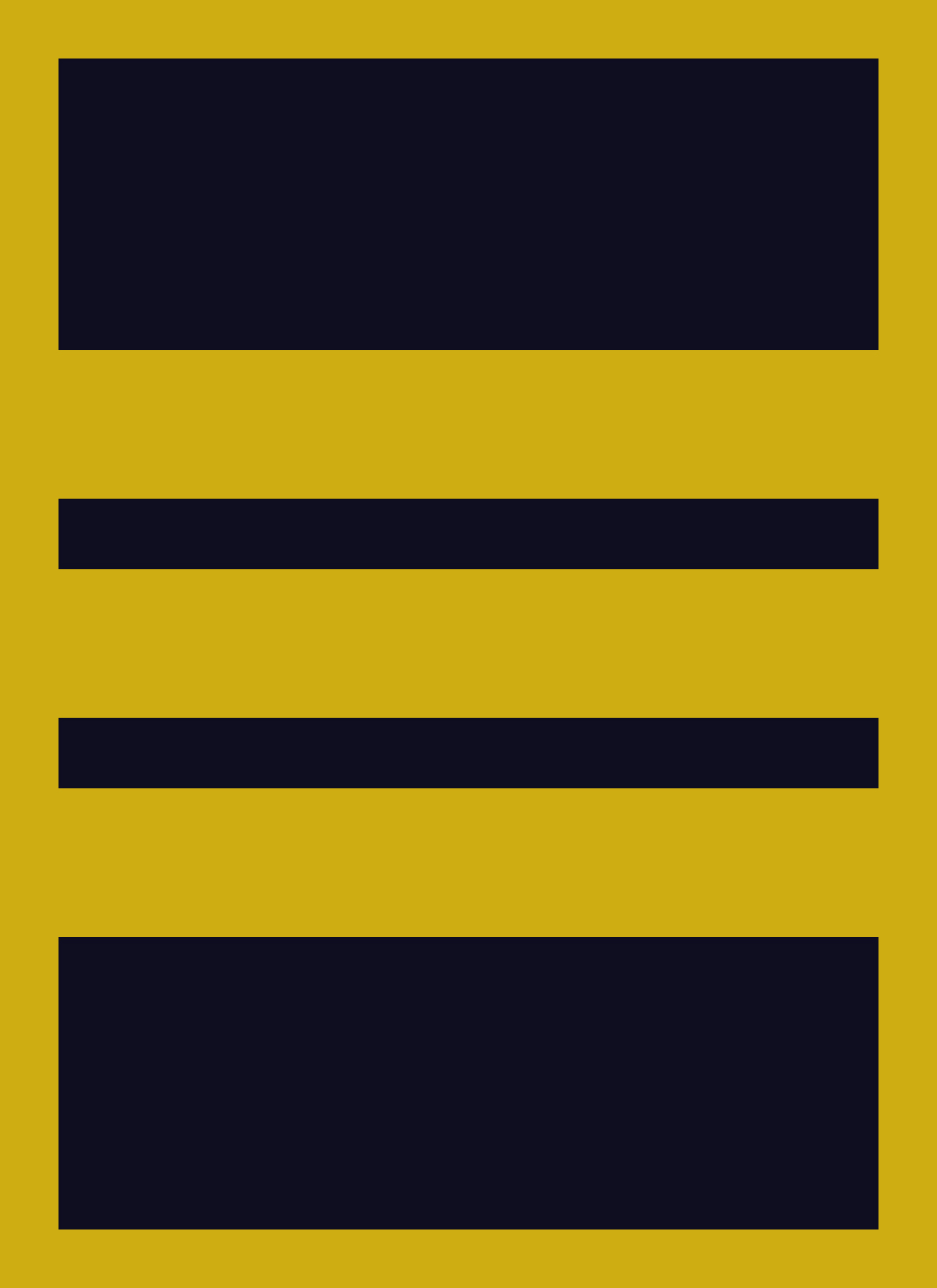
Flight suit sleeve insignia for a lieutenant colonel
(2003–present)

==== Army ====
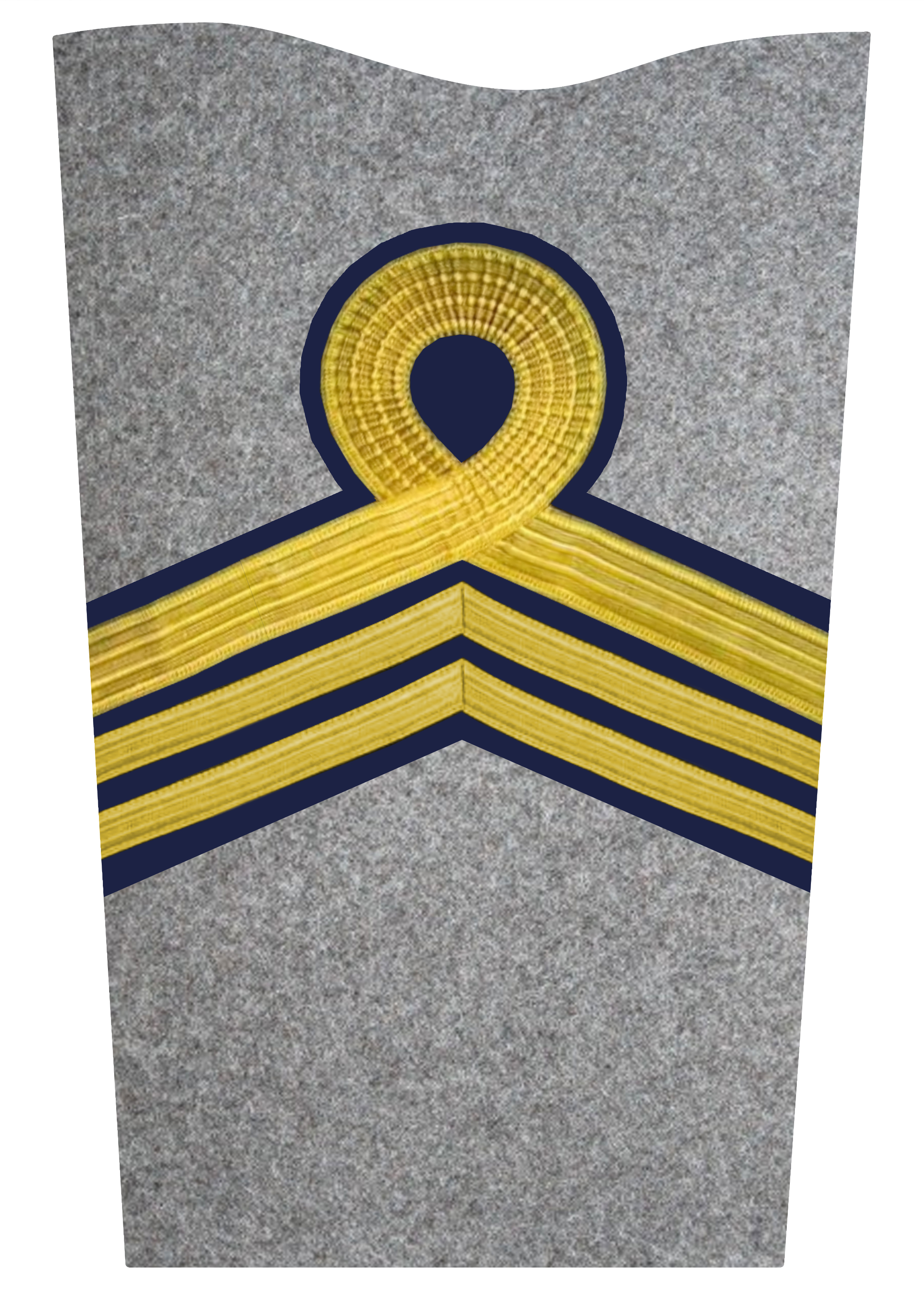
Sleeve insignia on uniform m/1906 for a lieutenant colonel.

==== Navy (Amphibious Corps) ====
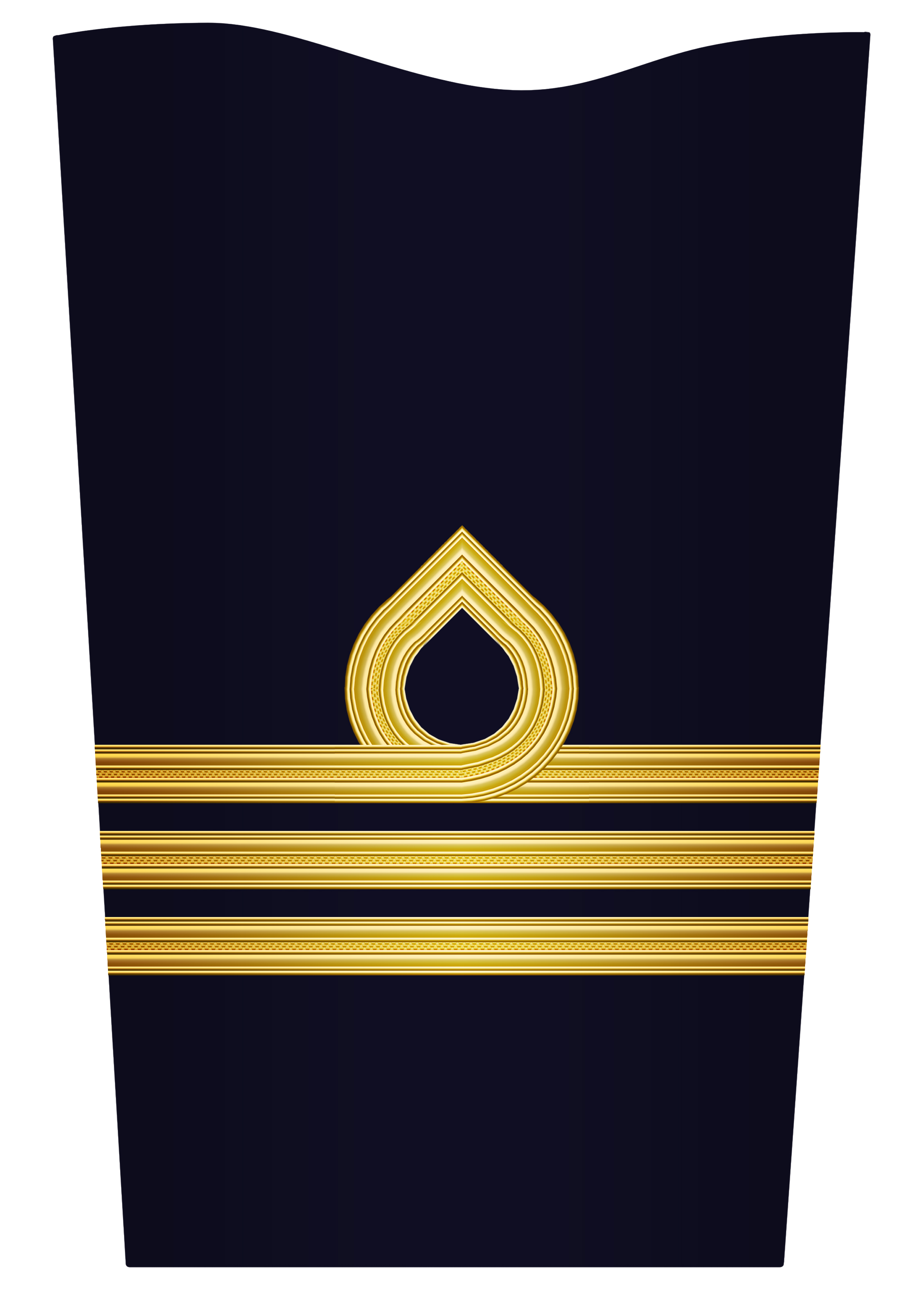
Sleeve insignia on innerkavaj m/48 ("inner jacket m/48") for a lieutenant colonel.
(2003–present)

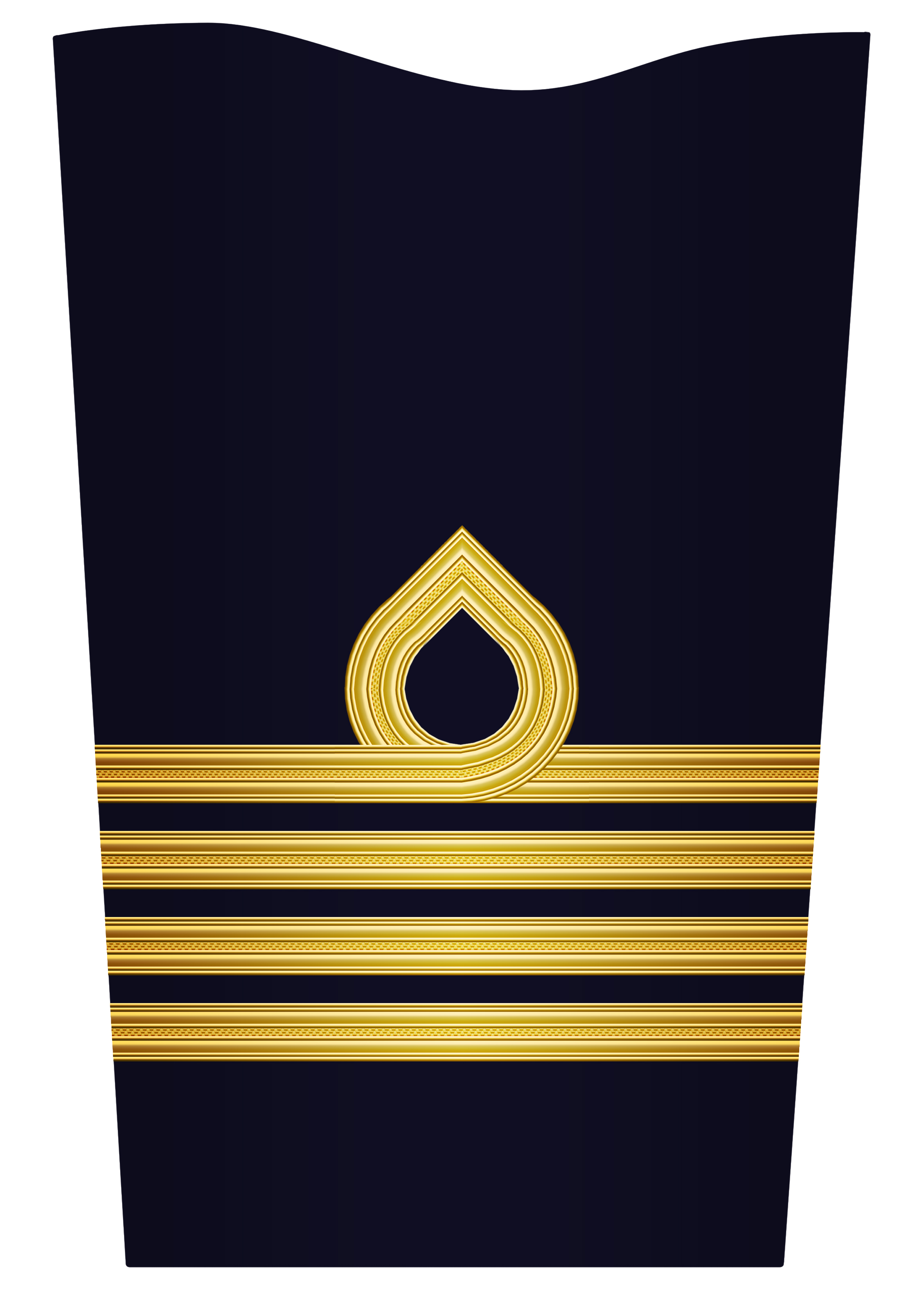
Sleeve insignia on innerkavaj m/48 ("inner jacket m/48") for a lieutenant colonel.
(–2003)

=== Hats ===
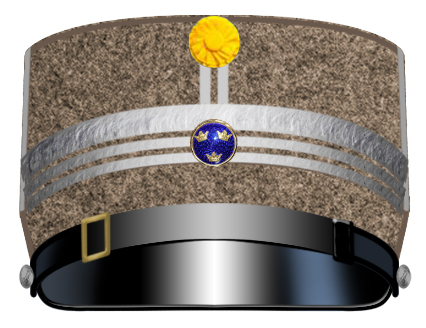
Hat (Mössa m/1923) for a lieutenant colonel.

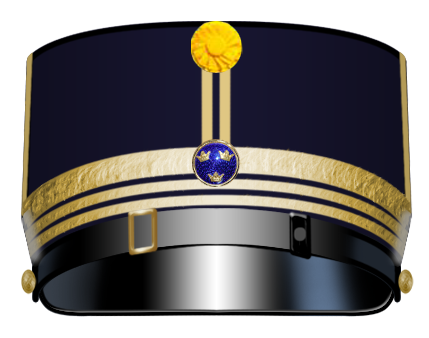
Camp hat (Lägermössa m/1865-99) for a lieutenant colonel.

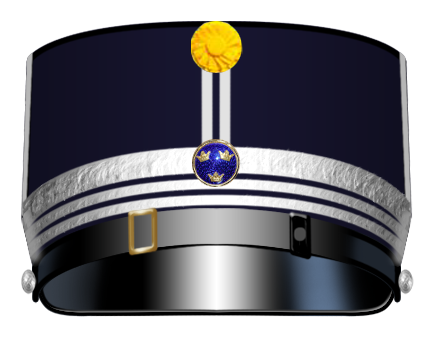
Hat (Mössa m/1865-99) for a lieutenant colonel in Life Guards infantry.

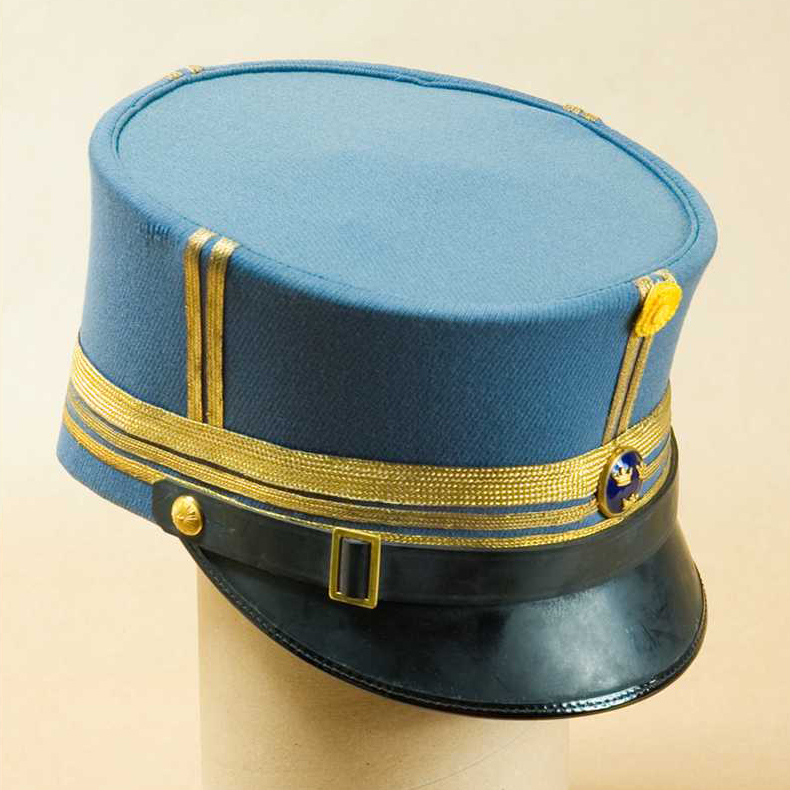
Hat (Mössa m/Mössa m/1865-99) for a lieutenant colonel in the Fortification Corps

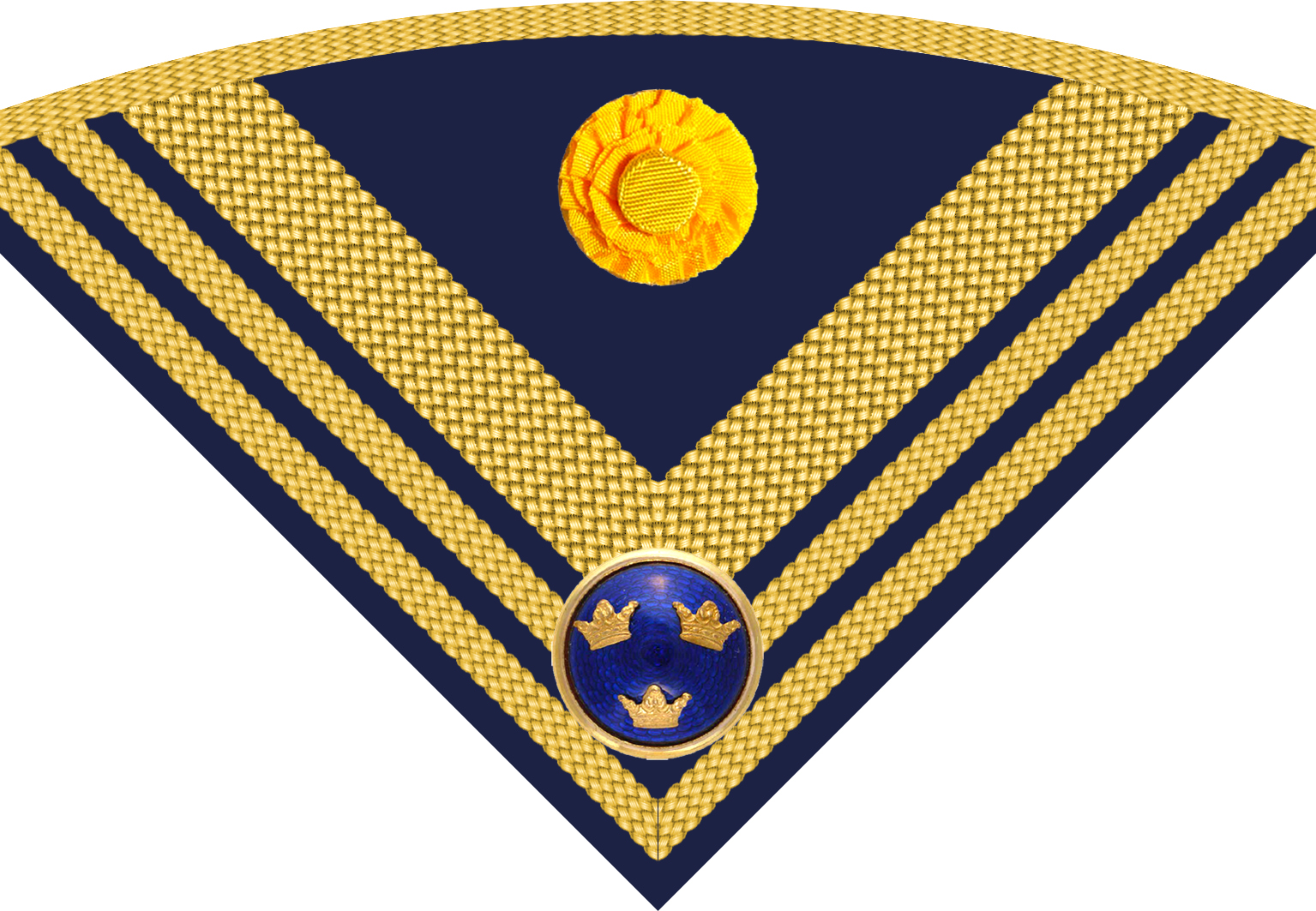
Rank insignia for a lieutenant colonel on hat (Hatt m/1910-14) in the army.
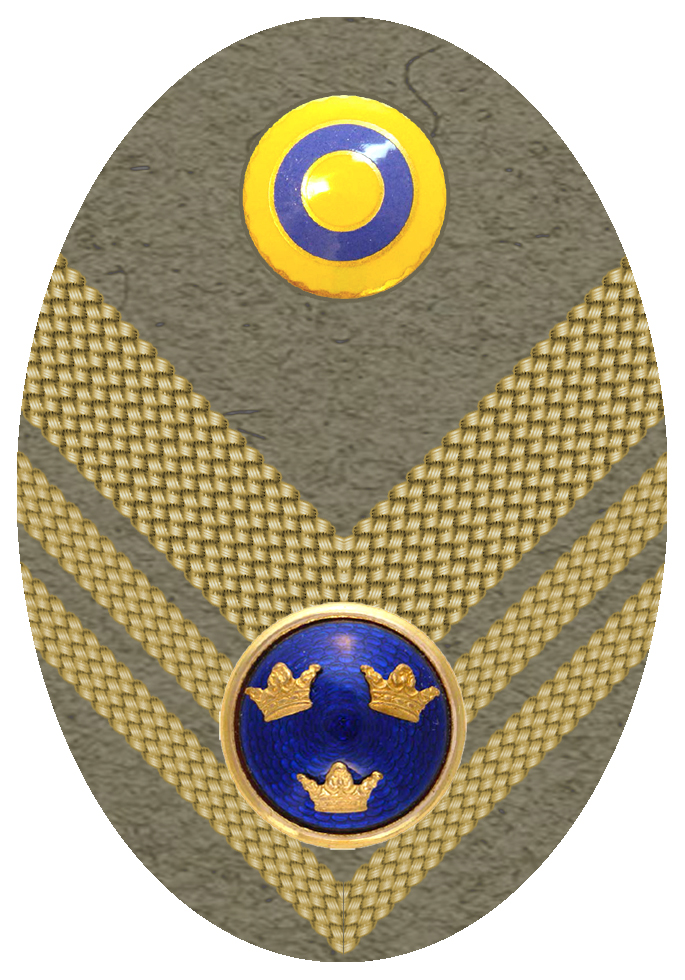
Hat badge (Mössmärke m/1946) for a lieutenant colonel in the army.

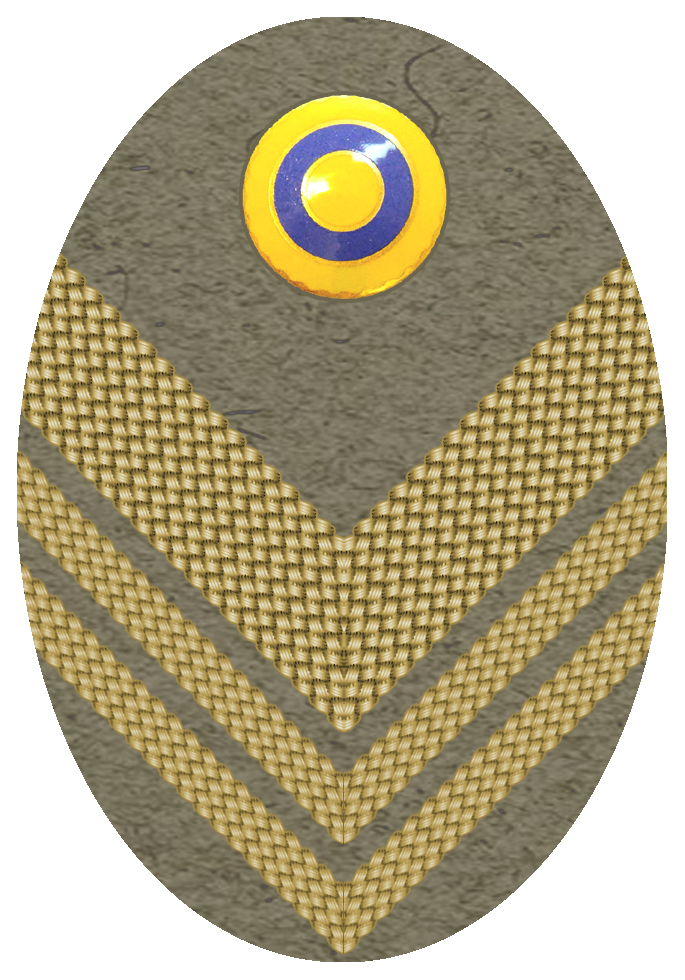
Hat badge (Mössmärke m/1940) for a lieutenant colonel in the army.

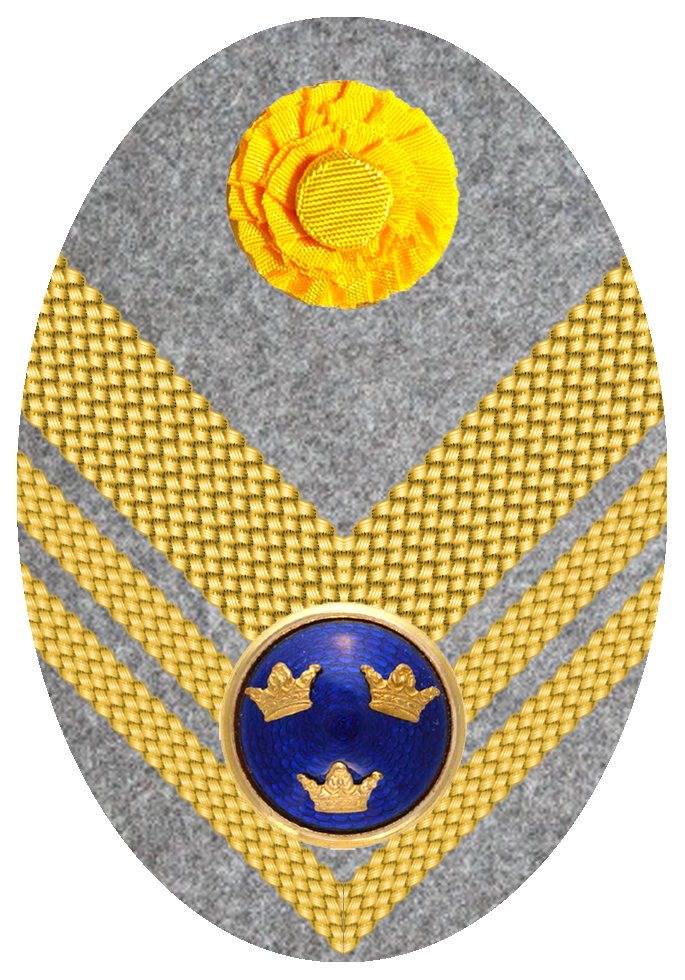
Hat badge (Mössmärke m/1914) for a lieutenant colonel in the army on fur hat (pälsmössa m/1909-14).

=== Epaulette ===
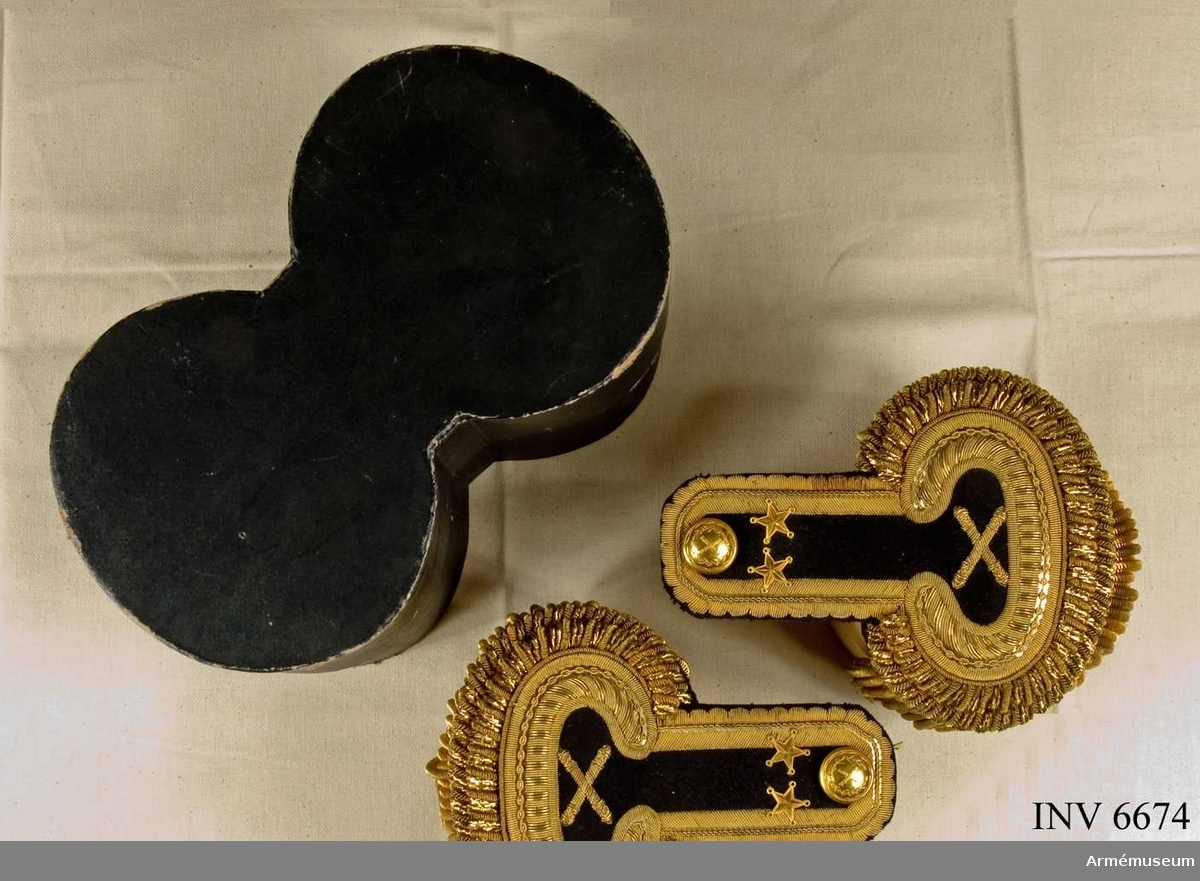
Epaulette for a lieutenant colonel in the General Staff

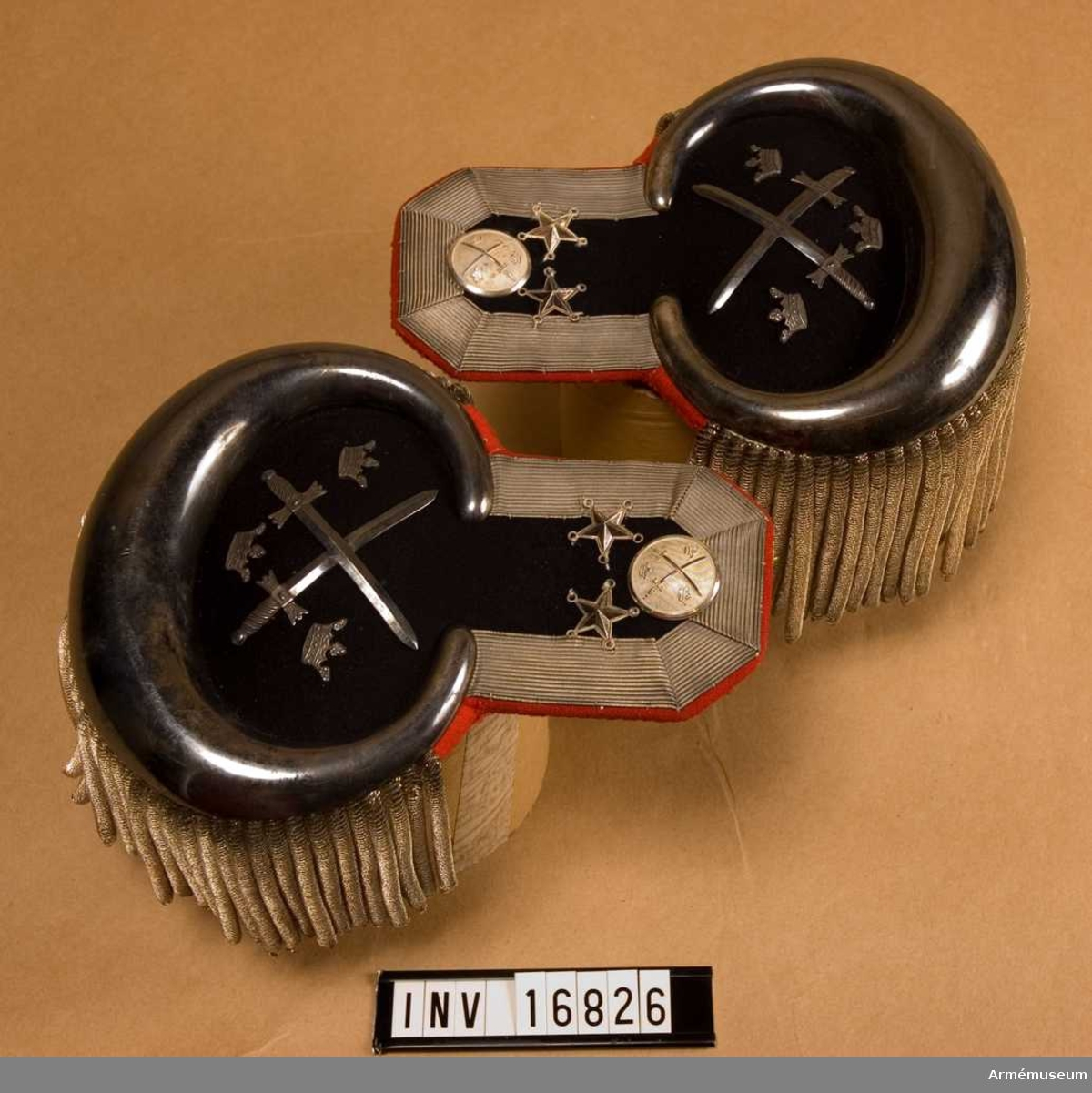
Epaulette for a lieutenant colonel in the Army Quartermaster Corps
