= Hemming Gadd =

Swedish Army officer

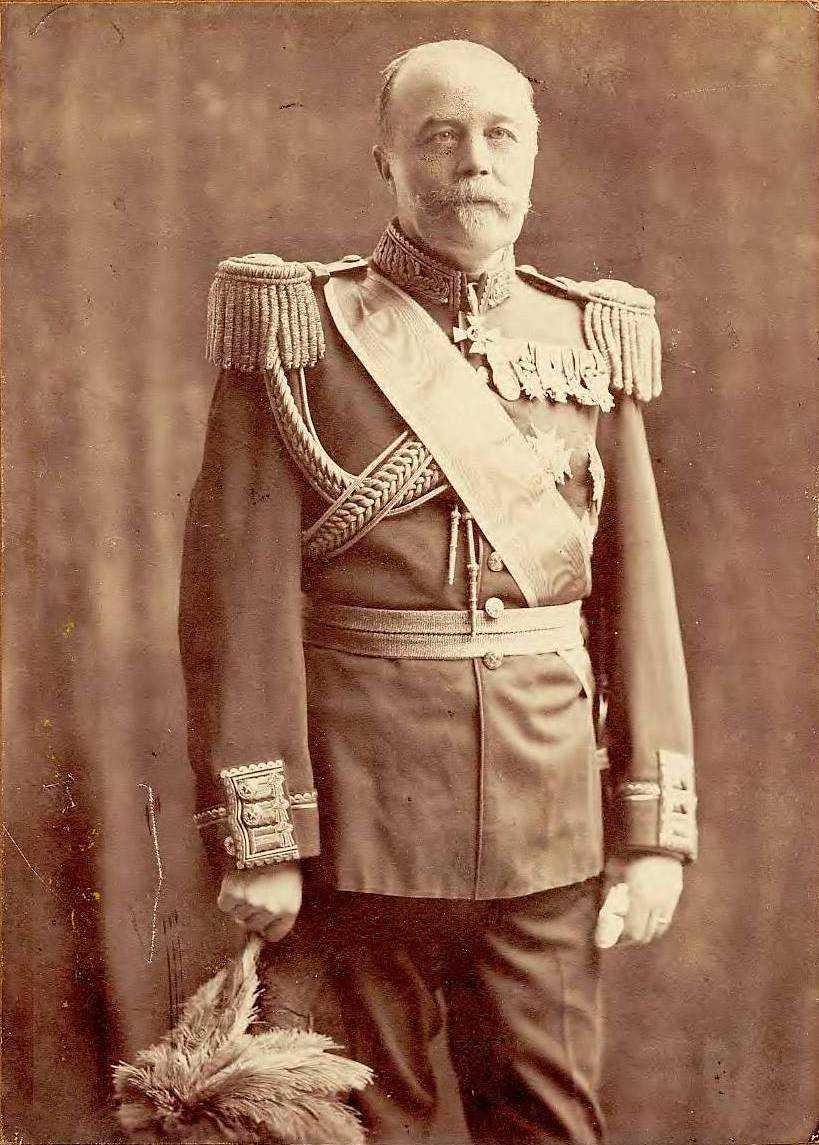
- Born: 6 November 1837; Harlösa, Sweden
- Died: 14 January 1915 (aged 77); Stockholm, Sweden
- Military career
- Allegiance: Sweden
- Branch: Swedish Army
- Service years: 1858–1905
- Rank: General
- Commands: Royal Swedish Army Staff College; Military Office of the Ministry of Land Defence; 2nd Life Grenadier Regiment; Svea Life Guards; 4th Army Division; Commandant General in Stockholm

General Hemming Gadd (6 November 1837 – 14 January 1915) was a Swedish Army officer. His senior commands included regimental commander of the 2nd Life Grenadier Regiment and Svea Life Guards, as well as commander of the 4th Army Division. Gadd served as Chief of His Majesty's Military Staff from 1905 to 1907.

== Early life ==
Gadd was born on 6 November 1837 in Harlösa, Sweden, the son Johan Niklas Gadd, a provost, and his wife Sofia Dahlberg. In 1857 he served as a non-commissioned officer in the North Scanian Infantry Regiment (I 6), and he was commissioned as an officer the following year.

== Career ==
In 1861, Gadd graduated from the Higher Artillery School (Högre artilleriläroverket) in Marieberg in Stockholm and in 1865 became a general staff officer serving in the 1st Military District (1:a militärdistriktet) as a staff adjutant until 1871. He was promoted to lieutenant in the army in 1865 and in the regiment in 1867. After serving in the General Staff's Statistics Department, he was appointed captain in 1873 at the same year reorganized General Staff. He then served as chief of staff in the 1st Military District from 1872 to 1878. In the years 1875-1876 he made a study trip to Germany as a scholarship holder of the General Staff. From 1879 to 1883, Gadd was a teacher of warfare and military history at the Royal Swedish Army Staff College. During his early military career, Gadd also participated in field service exercises in Prussia in 1869 and Hanover in 1874, as well as in the autumn exercises in Germany in 1877.

In 1880, Gadd was promoted to major in the General Staff and he served as Vice Chief of the Military Office of the Ministry of Land Defence from 1880 to 1883. In 1883 he was appointed lieutenant colonel in the North Scanian Infantry Regiment and was appointed head of the Royal Swedish Army Staff College, where he had worked as a teacher since 1879. Gadd then served as Chief of the Military Office of the Ministry of Land Defence from 1886 to 1888 when he became lieutenant colonel in the General Staff and was appointed regimental commander of the 2nd Life Grenadier Regiment (I 5), with the rank of colonel. He transferred to the Svea Life Guards (I 1) in 1892 where he took up the position of executive commander. Gadd was promoted to major general in 1892 and four years later, on 16 January 1896, he was appointed commander of the 4th Army Division, succeeding Crown Prince Gustaf on the post. Gadd was promoted to lieutenant general in 1902 and on 8 November 1905, he left the position as commander and was promoted to general. After the Commandant General in Stockholm, Lieutenant General Sven Lagerberg, died in March 1905, Gadd took over the position between March and November 1905.

Gadd was appointed as ADC to King Oscar II in 1881 and as senior ADC to the King in 1888. During his military service, he was a member of, among others, the committee for the preparation of proposals for exercise regulations for the infantry (1893–1894), the Committee for Investigation Concerning the Country's Permanent Defence (1897–1898), the Committee for the Preparation of Field Service Regulations (1899–1901), the Committee for Reviewing Proposals for New Army Order (1900) and the Committee for the Revision of Regulations and Instructions for Infantry Training (1902–1904). In addition to its military activities, Gadd was chairman of the executive board of the Royal Central Gymnastics Institute from 1894 to 1909, of the Court-Martial of Appeal from 1903 to 1910 and of the Executive Board of the Army Pension Fund (Arméns pensionskassa) from 1905 and the King's Hospital (Konungens hospital). Gadd also served as Chief of His Majesty's Military Staff from 1905 to 1907.

== Personal life ==
In 1877, Gadd married Ida Paulina Benedicks (4 October 1849 – 29 November 1921).

== Death ==
Gadd died on 14 January 1915 in his home in Stockholm. Gadd was interred at Norra begravningsplatsen in Stockholm.

== Dates of rank ==
- 1858 – Underlöjtnant
- 1865 – Lieutenant
- 1872 – Captain
- 1880 – Major
- 1883 – Lieutenant colonel
- 1888 – Colonel
- 1892 – Major general
- 1902 – Lieutenant general
- 1905 – General

== Awards and decorations ==
=== Swedish ===
- (Sweden) Knight and Commander of the Orders of His Majesty the King (Order of the Seraphim) (1 December 1905)
- (Sweden) King Oscar II and Queen Sofia's Golden Wedding Medal (1907)
- (Sweden) King Oscar II's Jubilee Commemorative Medal (1897)
- (Sweden) Commander Grand Cross of the Order of the Sword (1 December 1899)
- (Sweden) Commander 1st Class of the Order of the Sword (1 December 1893)
- (Sweden) Knight 1st Class of the Order of the Sword (1879)

=== Foreign ===
- (Denmark) Grand Cross of the Order of the Dannebrog (between 1894 and 1901)
- (Denmark) Commander 1st Class of the Order of the Dannebrog (between 1890 and 1894)
- (Kingdom of Prussia) Knight of the Order of Merit of the Prussian Crown (3 August 1908)
- (Kingdom of Prussia) Knight 1st Class of the Order of the Crown (between 1905 and 1908)
- (Kingdom of Prussia) Knight 3rd Class of the Order of the Crown (between 1877 and 1881)
- (Kingdom of Prussia) Knight 2nd Class of Order of the Red Eagle with diamonds (between 1888 and 1890)
- (Grand Duchy of Baden) Commander 2nd Class of the Order of the Zähringer Lion (between 1881 and 1888)
- (France) Knight of the Legion of Honour (between 1877 and 1881)
- Knight of the Order of the Crown of Italy (between 1877 and 1881)
- (Norway) Knight 1st Class of the Order of St. Olav (1882)

== Honours ==
- Member of the second class of the Royal Swedish Academy of War Sciences (1880)
- Member of the first class of the Royal Swedish Academy of War Sciences (1892)

Military offices
Preceded by Johan Olof Billdau Stecksén	Royal Swedish Army Staff College; 1883–1886	Succeeded by Adolf Malmborg
Preceded by Adam Anders Thorén	Military Office of the Ministry of Land Defence; 1886–1888	Succeeded by Carl Warberg
Preceded by Harald Spens	2nd Life Grenadier Regiment; 1888–1892	Succeeded by Fritz Lovén
Preceded by Henric Ankarcrona	Svea Life Guards; 1892–1896	Succeeded by Carl Lagercrantz
Preceded by Crown Prince Gustaf	4th Army Division; 1896–1905	Succeeded by Carl Warberg
Preceded by Sven Lagerberg	Commandant General in Stockholm; March 1905 – November 1905	Succeeded by Carl Warberg
Professional and academic associations
Preceded by Christian Lovén	Chairman of the Military Society; 1902–1909	Succeeded by Carl Rosenblad
Court offices
Preceded by Sven Lagerberg	Chief of His Majesty's Military Staff; 1905–1907	Succeeded by Carl Rosenblad as Acting
