= Herman Wrangel (1859–1938) =

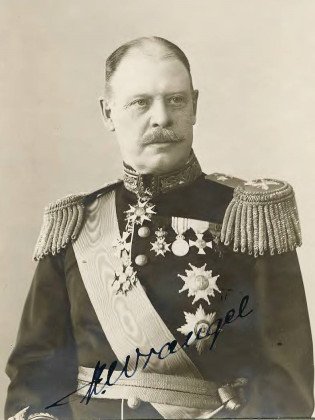
- Born: Herman Georg Waldemar Wrangel; 30 March 1859; Stockholm, Sweden
- Died: 13 January 1938 (aged 78); Harlösa, Sweden
- Military career
- Allegiance: Sweden
- Branch: Coastal Artillery (Swedish Navy)
- Service years: 1879–1924
- Rank: Lieutenant General
- Commands: Communications Dept., Fleet Staff; Flag captain; Communications Dept., Naval Staff; Swedish Coastal Artillery

Lieutenant General Herman Georg Waldemar Wrangel (30 March 1859 – 13 January 1938) was a senior officer in the Swedish Coastal Artillery. He served as commanding officer of the Swedish Coastal Artillery for 15 years (1909–1924). Wrangel served as secretary, member and chairman of a number of committees and commissions. Wrangel was also a member of the Upper House of the Riksdag and a member of the Committee on Defence as well as of the Committee of Supply.

== Early life ==
Wrangel was born on 30 March 1859 in Klara Parish, Stockholm, Sweden, the third son of the then lieutenant, later colonel Erik Fredrik Wrangel (1816–1896) and his wife Katarina Maria Gustafva Ehrenstam, a daughter of minister Johan Fredrik Ehrenstam and his wife (née af Trolle). Through this mother, Herman Wrangel had naval ancestry: before his appointment as head of the Ministry for Naval Affairs, his grandfather was a colonel and second-in-command of the Swedish Navy Construction Corps. His grandmother was the granddaughter of admiral Henrik af Trolle, together with Chapman in his time the innovator of the Swedish Navy. On his father's side he belonged to the branch of the old extensive Wrangel family, which in a younger lineage culminated in the field marshal, equally famous for his warlike exploits on land and at sea, Count Carl Gustaf Wrangel.

Wrangel was the brother of Carl Wrangel (1855–1913), Lieutenant General Johan Gustaf Fabian Wrangel (1858–1923) and professor Ewert Wrangel (1863–1940). He became a student at the Royal Swedish Naval Academy in 1873 and a sea cadet in 1877 and a cadet non-commissioned officer in 1878. Wrangel graduated in 1879 and was appointed acting sub-lieutenant (underlöjtnant) in the Swedish Navy the same year. Wrangel then attended the Royal Central Gymnastics Institute from 1882 to 1884.

== Career ==
=== Military career ===
Wrangel was promoted to sub-lieutenant (löjtnant) in 1883 and two years later he was called up for service in the General Staff and continued partly there, partly in the Fleet Staff until 1889, when at the same time as his appointment as captain he was commanded to serve as an adjutant in the Military Office of the Ministry for Naval Affairs, which position he held until 1891. In the spring of 1889 he was also posted as a substitute teacher on board cadet ships and maintained this position for three summers in a row and then for seven years he maintained the position as a regular teacher in navigation at the Royal Swedish Naval Academy. In 1893 he also became a teacher in naval warfare after the then lieutenant Wilhelm Dyrssen, and retained this post until 1901. In 1895 he had also been appointed teacher of naval science at the Royal Swedish Army Staff College, in 1898 as teacher of strategy at the Royal Swedish Naval Academy and in 1900 as teacher of tactics at the same educational institution. During his work as a teacher at the Royal Swedish Naval Academy, Wrangel invented and designed a new solution to the problems of astronomical navigation (location determination through two altitude observations), which were then still widely used by Swedish navigators. Wrangel was promoted to lieutenant commander and was posted as head of the Communications Department in the Fleet Staff from 1900 to 1901. After finishing his teaching career at the Royal Swedish Army Staff College in 1903, he also resigned from his remaining teaching positions in the spring of 1906. Wrangel served as flag captain of the staff of the Commander-in-Chief of the Coastal Fleet from 1904 to 1907. He was promoted to captain in 1907 and to major general in 1909 and appointed commander of the Swedish Coastal Artillery. He was promoted to lieutenant general in 1916 and went on a study trip to the Western Front in 1918. He left active service in 1924 and entered the reserve from which he left in 1932.

Wrangel was secretary, member and chairman of a number of committees and commissions, including secretary of the Naval Materiel Committees (Sjökrigsmaterielkommittéerna) in 1892 and member in 1901, member of the Defence Committee (Försvarskommittén) from 1909 to 1910, chairman of the Navigation School Committee (Navigationsskolekommittén) from 1910 to 1911 and for experts concerning the organization of the permanent coastal defence in 1913 as well as in the Coastal Fortification Commission (Kustbefästningskommissionen) from 1914 to 1918. He was an executive board member of the Swedish Shipping and Navy League (Föreningen Sveriges flotta) from 1906 to 1930, and became its chairman in 1924 and its honorary chairman in 1934. From 1913 to 1930 he was chairman of the board of the Swedish Aeronautical Society. Wrangel was also chairman of the board of Stockholms Nya Spårvägs AB from 1905 to 1915.

=== Political career ===
Wrangel was a member of the Upper House of the Riksdag (where he belonged the National Party) from 1909 to 1910 for Blekinge County and from 1914 to 1919 for Gothenburg and Bohus County and including a member of the Committee on Defence in 1914, of the select committee no 2 in 1915, no 1 in 1917 and in 1918 as well as of the Committee of Supply in 1918 and in 1919. Within the Riksdag, Wrangel worked for the strengthening of the defence (especially the navy) and for the increase of construction activities, and towards the end of his term as Member of the Riksdag strongly emphasized the need for frugality with state funds. In this a respect at the Riksdag of 1919, he alone opposed within the Committee of Supply against the index number raised by the committee for the calculation of the cost-of-living bonus. Wrangel's opinion was also followed by the Upper House, but in the joint vote the committee's proposal was approved. Wrangel was also a diligent writer, especially in the naval field, in addition to a number of magazine and newspaper essays as well as articles in Nordisk familjebok as well as several brochures published, among others Sjövind, tankar i försvarsfrågan (1886), Lärobok i teoretisk och praktisk navigation (1897; 2nd edition in 1910; translated to Spanish), Svenska flottans bok (1898) as well as the work based on extensive research Kriget i Östersjön 1719–1721 (2 volumes, 1906–1907), and for two years he conducted research for the part of the General Staff's work Sveriges krig åren 1808–09 ("Sweden's war in the years 1808–09"), which includes the war at sea.

== Personal life ==
Wrangel married on 19 December 1883 in Karlskrona City Parish (Karlskrona stads församling) to Gertrud Hallberg (25 May 1862 in Karlskrona – 17 March 1914 in Skeppsholms Parish, Stockholm), the daughter of the vicar August Ferdinand Hallberg and Marie Charlotte Crona. Wrangel married on 7 March 1922 in Stockholm (Västerhaninge Parish, Stockholm County) with Gertrud Erika Matilda Sterky (11 May 1884 – 4 March 1923 in Solna Parish), the daughter of Carl Gustaf Sterky and Hedvig Augusta Norström.

He was the father of naval commander Erik Valdemar Hermansson (1884–1927), Maria Lizinka Hermansdotter (born 4 July 1887 in Karlskrona) and Gertrud ("Greta") Margareta Hermansdotter (born 11 June 1890 in Skeppsholms Parish, Stockholm).

Wrangel was the owner of Villa Ekebo in Harlösa, Malmöhus County.

== Death ==
Wrangel died on 13 January 1938 in Harlösa Parish, Malmöhus County, Sweden.

== Dates of rank ==
=== Fleet ===
- 1879-10-17 – Acting sub-lieutenant
- 1883-04-27 – Sub-lieutenant
- 1889-10-25 – Lieutenant
- 1900-12-31 – Lieutenant commander
- 1903-12-31 – Commander
- 1907-10-11 – Captain

=== Coastal Artillery ===
- 1909-08-13 – Major general
- 1916-08-16 – Lieutenant general

== Awards and decorations ==
- (Sweden) Commander Grand Cross of the Order of the Sword (6 June 1917)
- (Sweden) Commander 1st Class of the Order of the Sword (6 June 1911)
- (Sweden) Knight of the Order of the Sword (1 December 1899)
- (Sweden) Knight of the Order of the Polar Star (18 September 1897)
- (Sweden) Illis quorum (1931)
- (Sweden) (King Gustaf V Olympic Commemorative Medal (Konung Gustaf V:s olympiska minnesmedalj, GV:sOlM) (1912)

=== Foreign ===
- (Russian Empire) Knight 2nd Class with Star of the Order of Saint Stanislaus (28 June 1909)
- (Kingdom of Prussia) Knight 2nd Class of the Order of the Red Eagle (1908)
- (Austrian Empire) Knight of the Order of Franz Joseph (1903)
- (Portugal) Officer of the Order of Aviz (26 May 1898)
- (France) Knight of the Legion of Honour (July 1908)
- (Kingdom of Prussia) Knight of the 3rd Class of the Order of the Crown (18 September 1897)

== Honours ==
- Member of the Royal Swedish Academy of War Sciences (1st class 1899; 2nd class 1909)
- Member of the Royal Swedish Society of Naval Sciences (1890)
- Honorary member of the Royal Swedish Society of Naval Sciences (1909)
- Member of the Royal Society for Publication of Manuscripts on Scandinavian History (1907)

== Selected bibliography ==
- Wrangel, Herman (1892). Svenska örlogsflottan 1719 och dess förhållande till ryssarnas härjningar (in Swedish). Stockholm. SELIBR 8218203.
- Wrangel, Herman (1894). Sjövapnets betydelse i fosterlandets försvar. Svenska nationalföreningens skrifter, 99-2041721-1; 3 (in Swedish). Stockholm. SELIBR 8226012.
- Wrangel, Herman (1897). Lärobok i teoretisk och praktisk navigation (in Swedish). Gothenburg: Zachrissons boktr. SELIBR 10035200.
- Wrangel, Herman (1910). Lärobok i teoretisk och praktisk navigation (in Swedish) (2nd ed.). Gothenburg. SELIBR 8222437.
- Wrangel, Herman (1898). Svenska flottans bok: en populär framställning af vårt sjövapens utveckling och nuvarande ståndpunkt jämte skildringar af tjänsten och lifvet ombord, bilder från äldre och nyare tider (in Swedish). Stockholm: Seligmann. SELIBR 8223007.
- Wrangel, Herman (1899). Nationen och flottan. Svenska nationalföreningens skrifter, 99-2041721-1; 14 (in Swedish). Stockholm. SELIBR 8223001.
- Wrangel, Herman (1927). Marinlitteraturen 1901-1925: anteckningar. Marinlitteraturföreningen; 31 (in Swedish). Stockholm: Militärlitteraturföreningen. SELIBR 21431703.
- Wrangel, Herman (1928). Marinlitteraturen 1901-1925: anteckningar. Marinlitteraturföreningen, 0348-2405; 31 (in Swedish). Stockholm: Marinlitteraturförenings förl. SELIBR 8218767.

Military offices
Preceded by Sten Ankarcrona	Flag captain 1904–1907	Succeeded by Carl August Ehrensvärd
Preceded by ?	Communications Department of the Naval Staff; 1907–1909	Succeeded by Gustaf af Klint
Preceded by Otto Ludvig Beckman	Swedish Coastal Artillery; 1909–1924	Succeeded by Herman Wrangel
