= Road and Waterway Construction Service Corps =

- Väg- och vattenbyggnadskåren
- Active: 1851–2010
- Allegiance: Swedish Armed Forces
- Branch: Tri-service
- Type: Administrative corps/Personnel branch
- Role: Civil engineering
- Size: c. 100–250 people

Insignia
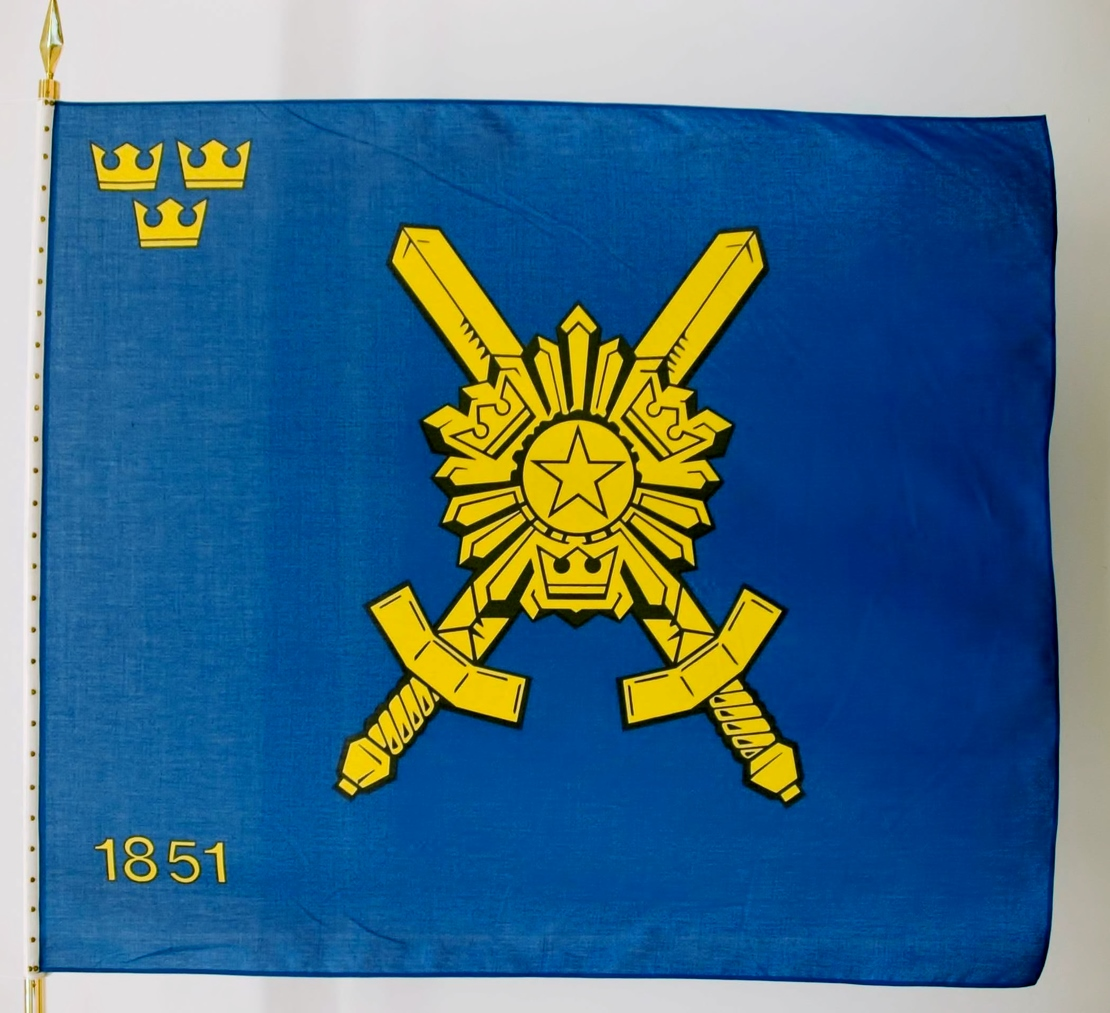
- Colour

The Road and Waterway Construction Service Corps (Swedish: Väg- och vattenbyggnadskåren, VVK) was during the years 1851–2010 a military administrative corps of reserve personnel in the Swedish Army, who was responsible for in the case of war provide the Swedish Armed Forces with specially trained personnel to maintain positions in the field of civil engineering.

== History ==
The Road and Waterway Construction Service Corps was established in 1851 as a military corps that primarily catered to the Swedish government's need for engineers for the planning and management of the so-called public works. The corps sorted under the Ministry of Communications and had under the regulations issued on 22 December 1851 the purpose of assisting the National Swedish Road Board (Väg- och vattenbyggnadsstyrelsen) in its dealings with public works; the officers of the corps could during the case of war be commanded to the engineering service in the Swedish Army. Concerning discipline, subordination and liability rules, the corps was under the jurisdiction of martial law. The corps was first set up only by certain officers of the Swedish Navy Mechanical Corps, the Army and the Navy, which had been employed in public companies and therein acquired practical skills.

The training of corps officers occurred in 1846-78 at the Higher Artillery and Engineering Grammar School (Högre artilleri- och ingenjörläroverket) in Marieberg in Stockholm, but according to a royal letter on 12 June 1885 a special military course for aspirants to the corps was now organized. To gain entry to this course required among other things that one had completed their final examination from the Royal Institute of Technology's Department of Civil Engineering. By royal letter on 19 October 1894 and 6 April 1900, new regulations had been provided for the military training. The corps officers were listed in accordance with the Royal Proclamation on 9 February 1906 to the Army's surplus staff.

The regulations in 1922 for entry into the corps were; to have completed the four-year syllabus of the training school (fackskola) for civil engineering at the Royal Institute of Technology, and from there have obtained full leaving certificate; after completing military service, have undergone a 7 1/2-month-long practical and theoretical course in artillery and fortification et cetera at the Svea Engineer Corps or be a reserve officer in the Swedish Fortification Corps; and after completing the course at the Royal Institute of Technology, have served at least 3 years at any public work or investigation function as well as to have evinced qualities, required for management of larger companies. During the early 1920s, 10 new corps officers were appointed annually. In 1921 the corps consisted of 221 officers. Of these, one was colonel (who was also the Director General of the National Swedish Road Board), seven lieutenant colonels, 34 majors, 102 captains and 77 lieutenants.

The development of this corps formed the basis for civil engineering education in Sweden and subsequently the Royal Institute of Technology in Stockholm. Also the Swedish Transport Administration has its roots in the corps. The corps later sorted under the Chief of the Army and the head was a senior colonel. The deputy head was a colonel. The rest of the corps staff held the ranks of lieutenant colonel, major, lieutenant or captain. Since 1937 the Road and Waterway Construction Service Corps has been a reserve officer corps. The corps was decommissioned on 30 September 2010 and the corps officers civil-military expertise in the infrastructure field was then transferred to Göta Engineer Regiment (Ing 2) in Eksjö. A ceremonial handover took place in mid-August 2010. The corps had during decommissioning 84 active officers.

== Tasks ==
The Road and Waterway Construction Service Corps had the task of in the case of war to provide the Swedish Armed Forces with specially trained personnel to maintain positions, which required insight in civil engineering, and if that conveniently can take place, also in peacetime provide the Swedish Armed Forces agencies counsel in matters that require access to particular expertise in civil engineering, to keep records of those who have completed university's civil engineering programme or have equivalent competence and other useful techniques in civil engineering for the Swedish Armed Forces, and in cooperation with the Enrollment Administration of the Swedish Armed Forces (Värnpliktsverket) and other relevant agencies of the Swedish Armed Forces propose both selection for the needs of the Swedish Armed Forces of a necessary number of technicians in civil engineering as measures for this personnel's appropriate activity during heightened preparedness.

== Heraldry and traditions ==
=== Coat of arms ===
The coat of arms of the Road and Waterway Construction Service Corps. Blazon: "Sable, two swords in saltire surmounted by a circle azure charged with a mullet on a cluster of rays as a pentagon, all or".

=== Medals ===
In 1993, the Väg- och vattenbyggnadskårens förtjänstmedalj ("Road and Waterway Construction Service Corps Medal of Merit") in gold and silver (VVKGM/SM). The medal is pentagonal and the medal ribbon is of black moiré with a narrow yellow line on the first side and a narrow blue line on the second side.

== Heads ==
Until 1934, the head of the Road and Waterway Construction Service Corps was also the Director General of the National Swedish Road Board (Väg- och vattenbyggnadsstyrelsen).

- 1851–1856: Axel Erik von Sydow
- 1858–1877: Otto Modig
- 1877–1887: Carl Gottreich Beijer
- 1887–1887: Rudolf Cronstedt
- 1887–1893: Josef Richert
- 1893–1903: Lars Berg
- 1903–1924: Fridolf Wijnbladh
- 1924–1928: Carl Meurling
- 1926–1932: Fredrik Enblom
- 1932–1932: Richard Ekwall
- 1933–1934: Nils Bolinder (acting)
- 1934–1946: Ernst Lindh
- 1946–1951: Agne Sandberg
- 1952–1963: Tord Lindblad
- 1963–1971: Torsten R. Åström
- 1971–1982: Anders Lilja
- 1982–1987: Harald Alexandersson
- 1987–1989: Curt Hunhammar
- 1989–1994: Sven Hamberg
- 1994–2000: Gunnar Lindblad
- 2000–2007: Hans Engebretsen
- 2008–2010: Sven-Erik Delsenius
