= Jan-Gunnar Isberg =

Swedish Army officer

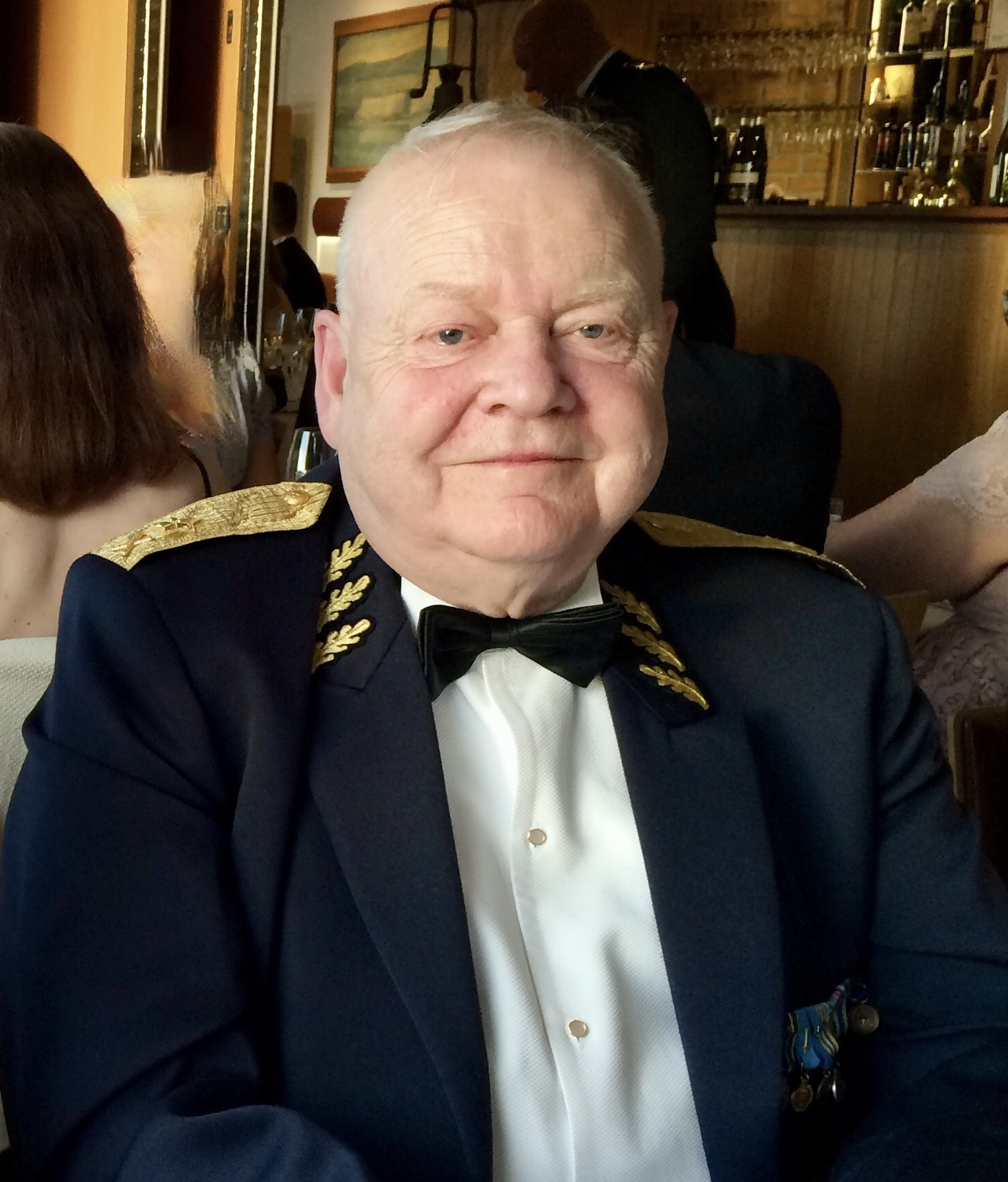
- Isberg in 2019
- Born: 7 April 1947 (age 79); Stockholm, Sweden
- Died: 14 December 2022 (aged 75); Stockholm, Sweden
- Military career
- Allegiance: Sweden
- Branch: Swedish Army
- Service years: 1969–2010
- Rank: Brigadier general
- Units: UNFICYP (1984); UNIFIL (1990–91); UNPROFOR/M (1993–95); IFOR (1996); UNSMA (2000); MONUC (2003–05)
- Commands: Army Field Work School (1991–93); Norrbotten Engineer Corps (1994–96); Haparanda Border Regiment (?); Deputy Force Commander MONUC (2003–05); BrigComdr MONUC (2003–05)
- Conflicts: Cyprus dispute (1984); South Lebanon conflict (1990–91); Yugoslav Wars (1993–95, 1996); Afghan Civil War (2000); Ituri conflict (2003-05); Kivu conflict (2003–05)

Brigadier General Jan-Gunnar Isberg (7 April 1947 – 14 December 2022) was a Swedish Army officer. Isberg has served extensively abroad, in Cyprus, Lebanon, Yugoslavia, Macedonia, Bosnia and Herzegovina, Bulgaria, Afghanistan and the Democratic Republic of the Congo. His senior commands include commanding officer of the Norrbotten Engineer Corps and the Haparanda Border Regiment, deputy force commander of MONUC and brigade commander of the Ituri Brigade and the Kivu Brigade. Isberg is one of only two Swedish officers (the other being Colonel Jonas Wærn) who have served as brigade commanders in combat under the auspices of the United Nations.

== Early life ==
Isberg was born on 7 April 1947 in Enskede-Parish, Stockholm, Sweden. Isberg graduated from Military Academy Karlberg (the same class as Ulf Henricsson) in 1969 and was commissioned as an officer the same year in Svea Engineer Regiment with the rank of lieutenant.

== Career ==
=== Early military career ===
From 1969 to 1975, Isberg served as platoon leader and company commander. He attended the Engineering Officers School at the Artillery and Engineering Officers School from 1971 to 1972 and the Swedish Armed Forces Staff College from 1975 to 1978 and served in the Army Staff from 1978 to 1983, whereupon Isberg served as company commander 1984 to 1985. His first mission abroad was with the United Nations Peacekeeping Force in Cyprus (UNFICYP) in Cyprus in 1984. Isberg was head of the Army Field Work Department in the Operation Section 4 in the Joint Operations (Operationsledningen, OPL) in the Defence Staff from 1985 to 1988 and he was promoted to lieutenant colonel in 1986 He served as battalion commander from 1988 to 1990, after which he was commander of the Swedish Lebanon Battalions L106/L21 from 1990 to 1991 and commanding officer of the Swedish Army Field Work School (Fältarbetsskolan, FarbS) from 1991 to 1993 and at the same time head of the Swedish UN Stand-by Force in 1992. In 1992, Isberg served as head of the System Department at the Swedish Defence Materiel Administration.

=== 1990s to early 2000s ===
In January 1992 during the Yugoslav Wars, during the planning stage of the Swedish contribution to the United Nations Protection Force (UNPROFOR), there was thought that the Swedish unit JK01 could largely amount to a battalion, possibly in cooperation with other nationalities. Battalion commander would be the then colonel Isberg, but politicians and other senior decision makers wanted otherwise. The force finally came to include a purely Swedish company instead, now led by major Jan Söderberg. In January 1993, Isberg was appointed to command Nordbat 1 (Nordic Battalion 1) with the United Nations Protection Forces/Macedonia (UNPROFOR/M), a joint Nordic unit consisting of a mechanized infantry company from Sweden, Norway and Finland, as well as a joint staff and train company from these countries. In mid-1993, American troops were sent to Macedonia and were put under Isberg's command. This was the first time a Swedish officer commanded American soldiers.

In 1993, Isberg was also appointed commanding officer of the Norrbotten Engineer Corps (Ing 3) and the Haparanda Border Regiment (Haparanda gränsregemente) (that consisted of the 2nd brigade of the Norrbotten Regiment) which comprised more than 6,000 men. In the 1990s, he also served as adviser in Bulgaria. In 1996, Isberg served in the Bosnia Army Corps Staff of the Implementation Force (IFOR). Isberg was promoted to senior colonel in 1997 and served at the Swedish Armed Forces Headquarters in Stockholm from 1997 to 1999: as head of the Program Department (1997–1998), as head of the Ground Warfare Department in the Joint Forces Directorate (Krigsförbandsledningen) (1998–1999). Isberg served as Senior Military Adviser at the United Nations Special Mission to Afghanistan (UNSMA) from 1999 to 2000 and from 2001 to 2003 he served as head of the Baltic Cooperation Department at the Swedish Armed Forces Headquarters.

=== Congo ===
In 2003, the UN decided to seriously deal with the war in the Congo. It had been going on for six years and the situation in northeastern Congo in 2003 was described as a slow-going genocide. Although a peace agreement had been signed in 2002, it was broken by militia groups in the eastern part of the country. Isberg arrived in Kinshasa, the capital of the Democratic Republic of the Congo (DRC) in late July 2003 to take up his post as deputy force commander of the UN peacekeeping mission in the DRC, known as MONUC. On 21 August 2003, Isberg was appointed acting commander of the Ituri Brigade - the UN force that took over on 1 September from the French-led Interim Emergency Multinational Force (IEMF) that had completed its mandate of securing the eastern town in Bunia in the embattled Ituri District. Overall, Isberg commanded 5,000 men in the Ituri District. The Ituri Brigade included personnel from Morocco, Bangladesh, Nepal and Pakistan; an Indian aviation unit; and a Bangladeshi and Indonesian engineering unit. In October 2003, Isberg, superseded as brigade commander by a Pakistani brigadier general, returned to his regular position at the MONUC headquarters in Kinshasa, a time as Acting Force Commander; the regular, Mountaga Diallo, was replaced in December by major general Somaila Ilyia from Nigeria, a superior with whom Isberg had easy cooperation. Isberg was later appointed commander of the Kivu Brigade from March 2004. He was the only western soldier in his brigade, which was composed of a Uruguayan and a Bangladeshi battalion, totalling 4,000 men.

During this time, Isberg was repeatedly sent to Ituri to lead the Ituri Brigade, and periodically he commanded both brigades, a total of 9,000 professional soldiers. In March 2004, Isberg suspended the work of raising the Kivu Brigade temporarily. Due to new unrest, he was sent back to Bunia to confront the UPC militias. In mid-March, he led from helicopters and from the ground four major operations aimed at cracking down on the UPC militia's core areas. There, among other things, the UPC brigade staff and other support points were destroyed. Later during the most extensive operation, they entered a large area of three militia camps. The main force was equipped with twenty armored vehicles. One company was landed by helicopter in the back of the militia. The militia quickly opened fire, and in the coming hours, battles were fought over a large area. Eventually, the militia took refuge. The attack helicopters were used to fight militias camps. After the cleaning operations, about twenty-one militiamen were arrested. Isberg would command the Kivu Brigade during 11 month, March 2004 to February 2005. Isberg has described his service in the Congo in his book By all necessary means: Brigadier General Jan-Gunnar Isberg's experiences from service in the Congo 2003-2005 (2012).

=== Later career ===
Isberg served as project manager for the Swedish Armed Forces international leadership exercises (Project Viking) from 2005 to 2010. In 2007, Isberg served as exercise director of Illuminated Summer 07, a multinational exercise with participants from Sweden, Estonia, Finland, Ireland, Norway and the United Kingdom. In 2008 he was responsible for the VIKING 08 exercise. At the end of the 2000s, internal and external criticism had been made of the fact that the Swedish Armed Forces did not manage to take care of and implement experience, especially in the context of more complex missions. Furthermore, an experience management process had already been proposed in the mid-2000s for the then Joint Forces Command (OPIL), but this was considered not to have been fully implemented. As a direct result of this, an internal investigation, under the direction of brigadier general Isberg, was added to analyze and propose measures to accelerate the development and implementation rate of systematic experience management.

In 2010, Isberg led a commission of inquiry into the killings of two Swedish officers in Afghanistan.

== Later life ==
Isberg was the chairman of the Fortifikationsklubben ("Fortification Club"), an association of fortification officers, engineer officers and officers of the Road and Waterway Construction Service Corps.

== Death ==
Isberg died on 14 December 2022 in Skarpnäck Parish, Stockholm.

== Dates of rank ==
- 1969 – Lieutenant
- 19?? – Captain
- 19?? – Major
- 1986 – Lieutenant colonel
- 1991 – Colonel
- 1997 – Senior colonel
- ???? – Brigadier general

== Honours ==
- Member of the Royal Swedish Academy of War Sciences (9 April 2007)

== Bibliography ==
- Isberg, Jan-Gunnar, ed. (1994). I skuggan av Gulfkriget (in Swedish). Militära mediaklubben. ISBN 91-88350-02-9. SELIBR 7770906.
- Isberg, Jan-Gunnar, ed. (1999). Ledarskap i krigsliknande situationer: redigerade bilder ur verkligheten: Makedonien 1993 Nordic Battalion. LI. Serie I, 1401-5676; 7 (in Swedish). Stockholm: Försvarshögskolan. SELIBR 2863360.
- Isberg, Jan-Gunnar; Victor Tillberg, Lotta; Svärd, Samuel (2011). Med alla nödvändiga medel: brigadgeneral Jan-Gunnar Isbergs erfarenheter från tjänstgöring i Kongo 2003-2005 (in Swedish). Stockholm: Svenskt militärhistoriskt biblioteks förlag. ISBN 978-91-85789-98-6. SELIBR 12334659.
- Isberg, Jan-Gunnar; Victor Tillberg, Lotta; Svärd, Samuel (2012). By all necessary means: Brigadier General Jan-Gunnar Isberg's experiences from service in the Congo 2003-2005. Translated by Henly, Stephen. Stockholm: Svenskt militärhistoriskt biblioteks förlag. ISBN 978-91-86837-11-2. SELIBR 13434478.
- Isberg, Jan-Gunnar; Fredriksson, Peter; Söderberg, Jan (2014). Sarajevo: tre svenska officerares berättelse om sina erfarenheter från kriget i forna Jugoslavien och uppgiften att samarbeta med NATO i Sarajevo i den praktiska underrättelseverksamheten på marken 1995-1996 (in Swedish). Stockholm: Försvarsmakten. ISBN 978-91-86837-76-1. SELIBR 17590234.
