= Ing 3 =

Ing 3 is a Swedish military designation (3rd Engineers) that has been used by the following units:

- Uppland Regiment (1902–1937)
- Royal Boden Engineer Corps (1937–1974)
- Boden Engineer Regiment (1975–1994)
- Norrland Engineer Corps (1994–2000)
