= Herman Wrangel (disambiguation) =

Herman Wrangel (1584/1587–1643) was a Swedish field marshal, Council of the Realm and Governor-General.

Herman Wrangel may also refer to:

- Herman Wrangel (diplomat) (1857–1934), Swedish diplomat, Minister for Foreign Affairs from 1920 to 1921
- Herman Wrangel (1859–1938), Swedish lieutenant general, commander of the Swedish Coastal Artillery from 1909 to 1924
