= Isberg =

Isberg is a Swedish surname that may refer to

- David Isberg (born 1975), Swedish musician
- Fríða Ísberg (born 1992), Icelandic novelist, short story writer and poet
- Jan-Gunnar Isberg (1947–2022), Swedish brigadier general
- Kerstin Isberg (1913–1984), Swedish swimmer
- Paul Isberg (1882–1955), Swedish sailor
- Ralph Isberg (born 1955), American professor
- Samson Isberg (1795–1873), Norwegian executioner
- Sixten Isberg (1921–2012), Swedish alpine skier
- Sophia Isberg (1819–1875), Swedish wood-cut artist
- Torunn Isberg (born 1949), Norwegian artistic gymnast
- Ture Isberg (1900–1989), Swedish footballer
