= Swedish Engineer Troops =

Engineering Troops of the Swedish Army

- Ingenjörtrupperna
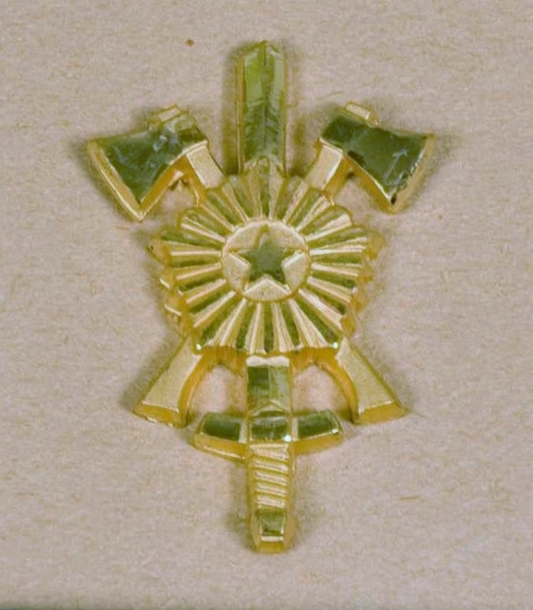
- Branch insignia m/60.
- Active: 1937–present
- Country: Sweden
- Allegiance: Swedish Armed Forces
- Branch: Swedish Army
- Type: Engineer corps
- Part of: Swedish Armed Forces Headquarters (Note: The branch was subordinate the Inspector of the Swedish Engineer Troops (Ingenjörinspektören) at the Engineer Department of the Army Staff from 1942 to 1991. After that, it was subordinate to the commander of the Swedish Army Field Works Center (1991–1997), the commander of the Swedish Army Center (1997–2000), the Joint Forces Command (2000–2005), and the Swedish Armed Forces Headquarters from 2005.)

Insignia
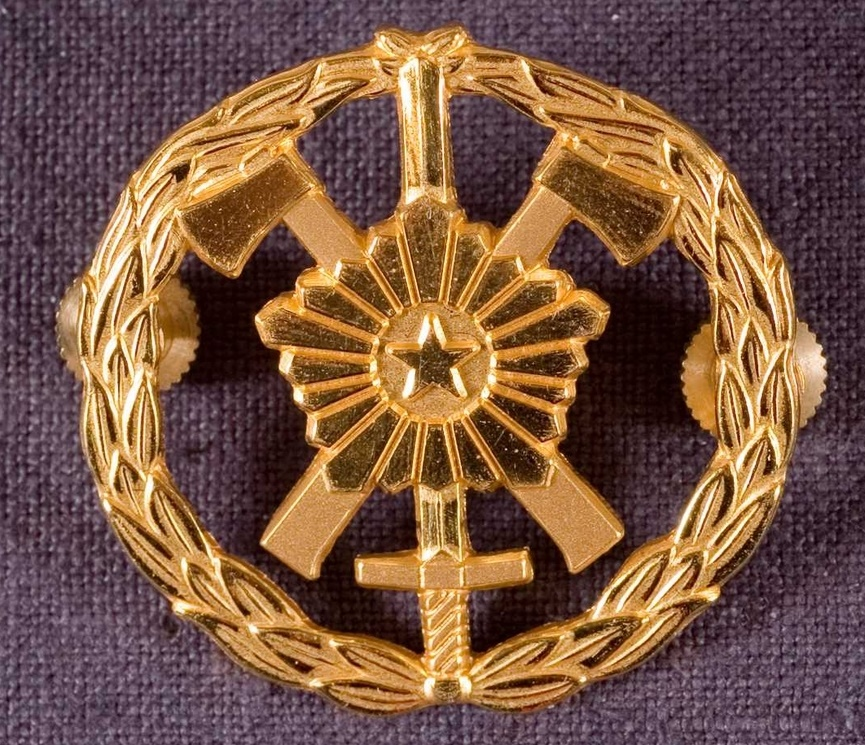
- Cap badge

The Swedish Engineer Troops (Swedish: Ingenjörtrupperna, I) is the engineer branch of the Swedish Army. The branch was formed after the Defence Act of 1936. It provides military engineering and other technical support to the Swedish Armed Forces. Today, it consists of a single unit, the Göta Engineer Regiment (Ing 2) and two schools, the Swedish Army Field Work School (Fältarbetsskolan, FarbS) and the EOD School (Amröjskolan, AmröjS).

== History ==
In the 1600s and 1700s, special engineer (or pioneer units) were organized. The Swedish Fortification Corps were established in 1635 as a special corps for construction of fortifications. The task of Fortification Corps was to build and maintain the country's land and coastal fortifications and other military buildings. In 1811, the Fortification Corps was amalgamated with the Field Surveying Corps (Fältmätningskåren) to the Engineer Corps (Ingenjörskåren). This consisted, among other things, of a fortification brigade. In 1867 the Engineer Corps was renamed the Fortification Corps. From 1855, sapper companies, a pontoon battalion, a field-signaling company and engineer troops were added to the Fortification Corps. The service branch expanded greatly towards the late 1800s, and in 1901 there were four corps; the Svea Engineer Corps (Ing 1), Göta Engineer Corps (Ing 2), Field Telegraph Corps (Ing 3), and Boden Engineer Corps (Ing 4).

According to the Defence Act of 1925, the Swedish Engineer Troops now came to consist of two field engineering corps (Svea and Göta, located in Stockholm and Eksjö), the Field Telegraph Corps (Stockholm) and Boden Engineer Corps. Svea Engineer Corps was organized on a corps staff, two field engineering companies, two military bridge companies, a fortress engineering company (Vaxholm) and a ordnance (sapper) company. Göta Engineer Corps was organized on a corps staff, three field engineering companies, a military bridge company, a fortress engineering company (Karlskrona) and a ordnance (sapper) company. The Field Telegraph Corps was organized on corps staff, two field telegraph companies, two radio companies and an ordnance company. The Boden Engineer Corps was organized on a corps staff, a field engineering company, a fortress engineering company, a military bridge company, a telegraph company and a ordnance (sapper) company.

The Swedish Engineer Troops constituted after the Defence Act of 1936 a special service branch, including three engineer corps: Svea Engineer Corps (Ing 1) in Solna, Göta Engineer Corps (Ing 2) in Eksjö and Boden Engineer Corps (Ing 4, later Ing 3) in Boden. It was established when the Fortification Corps was split into the Swedish Engineer Troops, Swedish Army Signal Troops and the Swedish Fortification Corps. A school to train officers in the engineer troops and to train other officers in the field working service was established in 1943 under the name Engineer Troop School (Ingenjörtruppskolan, IngS). It changed its name in 1952 to the Swedish Army School of Field Works (Arméns fältarbetsskola, FältarbS). On 1 June 1981 the Swedish Engineers [Cadet and] Officer Candidate School (Ingenjörtruppernas kadett- och aspirantskola, IngKAS) was amalgamated with the Swedish Army School of Field Works. It ceased and was part of the Swedish Army Field Works Center (Arméns fältarbetscentrum, FarbC) from 1 July 1991.

The Swedish Army Field Works Center was disbanded in 1997 and the Swedish Army Field Work School (Fältarbetsskolan, FarbS) continued operations together with the EOD School (Amröjskolan, AmröjS), both sorting under Göta Engineer Regiment (Ing 2) which since 2005 is the only remaining active engineer unit in the Swedish Engineer Troops.

== Units ==
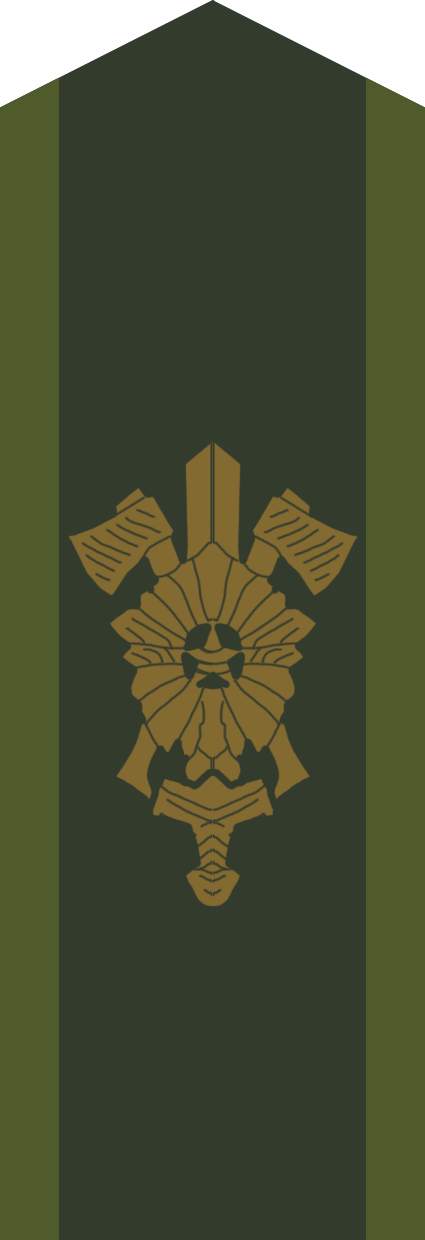
Collar patch of the Swedish Engineer Troops.

Designation	Years	Unit	Location
Ing 1	1855–1864	Sapper Company	Stockholm
Ing 1	1864–1866	Sapper Corps	Stockholm
Ing 1	1867–1892	Pontoon Battalion	Stockholm
Ing 1	1893–1902	Svea Engineer Battalion	Stockholm
Ing 1	1902–1957	Svea Engineer Corps	Stockholm –1922; Solna 1922–
Ing 1	1957–1994	Svea Engineer Regiment	Solna –1970; Södertälje 1970–
Ing 1	1994–1997	Svea Engineer Corps	Södertälje
Ing 2	1873–1876	Sapper Company	Stockholm –1875; Karlsborg 1875–
Ing 2	1876–1878	Sapper Troop	Karlsborg
Ing 2	1878–1892	Sapper Battalion	Karlsborg
Ing 2	1893–1902	Göta Engineer Battalion	Karlsborg
Ing 2	1902–1963	Göta Engineer Corps; one company in Karlskrona, Ing 2K 1908–1937	Karlsborg –1928; Eksjö 1928–
Ing 2	1963–1994	Göta Engineer Regiment	Eksjö
Ing 2	1994–2000	Göta Engineer Corps	Eksjö
Ing 2	2000–	Göta Engineer Regiment	Eksjö
Ing 3	1902–1937	Field Telegraph Corps; one company in Boden 1915– one company in Malmen 1916–1926, see S 1	Stockholm/Solna
Ing 3	1957–1975	Boden Engineer Corps see Ing 4	Boden
Ing 3	1975–1994	Boden Engineer Regiment	Boden
Ing 3	1994–2000	Norrland Engineer Corps	Boden
Ing 3	2000–2005	Norrland Engineer Battalion	Boden
Ing 3	2006–2011	Norrland Engineer Company	Boden
Ing 4	1902–1937	Norrland Engineer Corps see Ing 3	Boden
Ing 5	1914–1920	Norrland Engineer Corps; Was never raised	Östersund

== Inspector of the Swedish Engineer Troops ==
The chief of the engineer troops was referred to as the Inspector of the Swedish Engineer Troops (Ingenjörinspektören). From 1966 to 1991, the engineer troops and the signal troops had a joint branch inspector; the Inspector of the Swedish Army Engineer Corps and Signal Corps (Ingenjörinspektör- och Signalinspektören). (Note: Also called the Director of Swedish Army Engineers and Signals.) From 1991, the two branches received an inspector each, and the title of the engineer troops was shortened to the Engineer Inspector. In connection with the decommissioning of Swedish Army Field Work Center (Arméns fältarbetscentrum), the position of Engineer Inspector disappeared.

- 1937–1941: Sven Alin
- 1940–1941: Per (Pelle) Högstedt
- 1941–1946: Sigurd Rahmqvist
- 1946–1953: Inge Hellgren
- 1953–1963: Stig Berggren
- 1963–1967: Gunnar Smedmark
- 1967–1967: Harald Smith (acting)
- 1968–1969: Harald Smith
- 1969–1975: Åke Bernström
- 1975–1982: Kåre Svanfeldt
- 1982–1986: Owe Dahl
- 1986–1991: Bertil Lövdahl
- 1991–1993: Lars-Åke Persson
- 1993–1997: Christer Ljung
- 1997–1997: Björn Svensson

== See also ==
- Swedish Armoured Troops
- Swedish Army Signal Troops
- Swedish Army Service Troops
- List of Swedish engineer regiments
