= List of Swedish engineer regiments =

This is a list of Swedish engineer regiments, battalions, corps and companies of the Swedish Engineer Troops that have existed in the Swedish Army. They are listed in three ways, first by the actual units that have existed, then by the various names these units have had, and last by the various designations these units have had.

== By unit ==
- Sappörkompaniet (1855–1864)
- Sappörkåren (1864–1867)
- Pontonjärbataljonen (1867–1892)
- Svea ingenjörbataljon (1893–1902)
- Ing 1 Svea ingenjörkår (1902–1957, 1994–1997)
- Ing 1 Svea ingenjörregemente (1957–1994)
- Sappörbataljonen (1873–1892)
- Göta ingenjörbataljon (1893–1902)
- Ing 2 Göta ingenjörkår (1902–1963, 1994–2000)
- Ing 2 Göta ingenjörregemente (1963–1994, 2000– )
- Ing 3 Fälttelegrafkåren (1902–1937)
- Ing 3 Bodens ingenjörkår (1937–1975)
- Ing 3 Bodens ingenjörregemente (1975–1994)
- Ing 3 Norrlands ingenjörkår (1994–2000)
- Ing 4 Bodens ingenjörkår (1902–1937)

== By name ==
- Bodens ingenjörkår
- Bodens ingenjörregemente
- Göta ingenjörbataljon
- Göta ingenjörkår
- Göta ingenjörregemente
- Norrlands ingenjörbataljon
- Norrlands ingenjörkår
- Pontonjärbataljonen
- Sappörkompaniet
- Sappörbataljonen
- Sappörkåren
- Sappörtruppen
- Svea ingenjörbataljon
- Svea ingenjörkår
- Svea ingenjörregemente

== By designation ==
- Ing 1 - Svea Engineer Regiment (1957–1994)
- Ing 2 - Göta Engineer Regiment (1963–1994)
- Ing 3 - Boden Engineer Regiment (1937–2000)
- Ing 4 - Boden Engineer Regiment (1905–1937)
- Ingbat/I 19 (2000–2005)

== See also ==
- List of Swedish regiments
- Military district (Sweden)
- List of Swedish defence districts
