= Swedish Navy Mechanical Corps =

The Swedish Navy Mechanical Corps (Swedish: Flottans mekaniska kår) was a Swedish Navy corps with naval engineers from 1814 to 1868. In 1816, it was stipulated that the organization responsible for shipbuilding work in Karlskrona, known as the Byggnadsstaten, would be transformed into a special unit called the Swedish Navy Mechanical Corps after the completion of this work. This corps ceased to exist with the organization of the Mariningenjörsstaten in 1868.

== History ==
A separate construction staff, Byggnadsstaten, was established for the new dock construction in Karlskrona. However, when the dock construction work was discontinued, it was ordained by letters patent on 28 June 1814, that this construction staff would be merged with the Navy Mechanical Corps. In connection with the salary regulations decided in 1815, it was further stipulated by letters patent on 20 August 1816, that the aforementioned construction staff would, as before, constitute a separate corps, associated with service at the fleet's stations, under the name of the Flottornas mekaniska stat ("Mechanical Corps of the Fleets"), under the command of the adjutant general for the fleets. The Swedish Navy Mechanical Corps, like the Swedish Navy Construction Corps, underwent regulation in 1824. Additional salary regulations were implemented for the officers of this corps in 1854 and 1858. The latest regulation issued for this corps was dated 25 October 1855.

Even in the early 1870s, there were officers in the Navy Mechanical Corps, some on the state payroll and some off it. The former included officers serving at the fleet's stations, receiving pay from the fleet's budget. However, this class of officers from the mechanical corps disappeared entirely after the organization of the Mariningenjörsstaten in 1867. The builders listed on the salary list of the Mariningenjörsstaten now performed all construction work at the fleet's stations that was formerly carried out there by officers of the mechanical corps on the state payroll.

For the officers who still remained in the mechanical corps, the designation 'officer in the Navy Mechanical Corps' was merely a title. This title had no connection to the actual work these officers performed. Their work more closely resembled that of officers in the Road and Waterway Construction Service Corps or civil engineers and, therefore, has no direct connection to naval service, despite what the title suggests.

== See also ==
- Swedish Navy Construction Corps
