= Karl Amundson =

Swedish Air Force officer, ballooner and military attaché

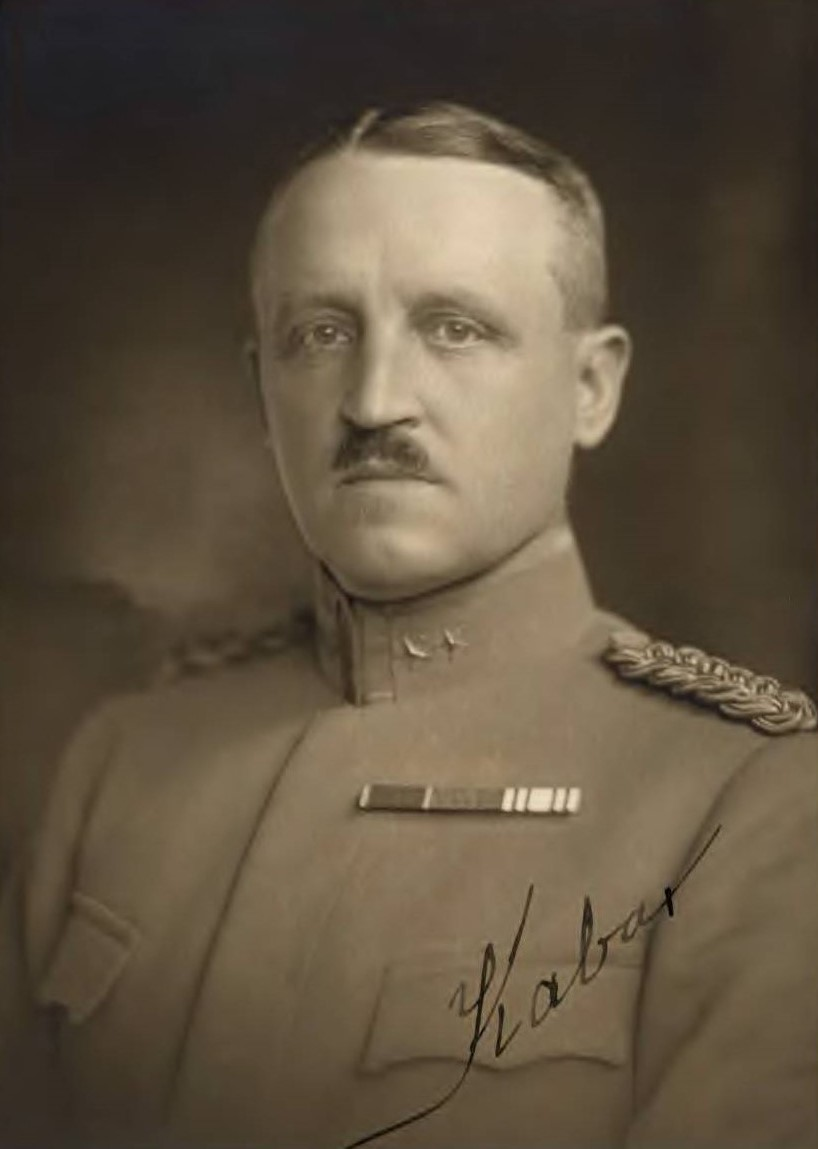
- Born: Karl Albert Byron Amundson; 29 November 1873; Grythyttan, Sweden
- Died: 21 February 1938 (aged 64); Stockholm, Sweden
- Relatives: Fale Burman (son-in-law)
- Military career
- Allegiance: Sweden
- Branch: Swedish Air Force
- Service years: 1894–1931
- Rank: Major general
- Commands: Field Telegraph Corps; Svea Engineer Corps; Chief of the Air Force

Major General Karl Albert Byron Amundson (KABA) (29 November 1873 – 21 February 1938) was a Swedish Air Force officer, ballooner and military attaché. He was the first Swedish Chief of the Air Force (1926–31).

== Career ==
Amundson was born on 29 November 1873 in Grythyttehed, Grythyttan, Sweden, the son of Colonel Johan Albert Amundson (born 1840) and Alma Helena Albertina Godtknecht (born 1854). Amundson became second lieutenant in the Swedish Fortification Corps in 1894, and was promoted to captain in 1904. He was a teacher at the Artillery and Engineering College from 1906 to 1910 and at the Royal Swedish Naval Staff College from 1910 to 1912. From 1911 to 1915 he was the Swedish military attaché in Paris and from 1912 to 1918 the one in Brussels, where he followed on the French side the operations during the World War I, the beginning and the end.

Amundson was promoted in 1915 to major and was elected the same year as a member of the Royal Swedish Academy of War Sciences. He was commander of the Field Telegraph Corps from 1915 to 1920 and 1924 to 1925 and Arméns flygväsende in 1915. He was promoted to lieutenant colonel in 1918 and was the commander of the Svea Engineer Corps (Ing 1) from 1920 to 1924 and was promoted to colonel in 1924 commander of Arméns flygväsende. He was promoted to major general in 1925 and was Chief of the Swedish Air Force from 1925 to 1931.

== Balloon activities ==
Amundson was in Paris during the year 1900 along with August Saloman to study balloons and aeronautics on the behalf of the Swedish Coastal Artillery and the Swedish Army. In December the same year he took part in the founding of a Swedish Aeronautic Society – or SAS – where he was the chairman from 1906 to 1911 and again 1930 to 1932.

He was one of the first Swedish ballooner (in 1903 he raced from Stockholm to Randers in 26 hours which was a record) and was one of the leaders of the international air races in Gothenburg in 1923. Amundson became vice president of the Fédération Aéronautique Internationale in 1924.

== Other work ==
Amundson was a member of the Defense Committee in 1916 and studied in the German, French and Belgian armies, in part during the war and at the fronts and in the Spanish Army. He was the Swedish representative at the aeronautic conferences in Paris, Brussels, Berlin, Madrid, Rome, Copenhagen and Kristiania.

He was chairman of the Swedish delegation for the Scandinavian Airline Convention from 1919 to 1921, chairman of the Air Commission from 1919 to 1921 and chairman of the Airport Advisory Board from 1920 to 1921. Amundson was a member of the Air Traffic Commission from 1919 to 1921, member of the Society of Idun and vice president of the Fédération Aéronautique Internationale. He was one of the founders of the Royal Swedish Aero Club, Swedish Military Sports Association and Solna Rifle Club. He was a board member of the Sweden's Central Association for the Promotion of Sport, the Royal Swedish Aero Club, the Royal Automobile Club and more.

== Personal life ==
In 1903 he was married Blenda Millberg (born 1880), the daughter of wholesaler Seth Millberg and his wife (née Bothén). They had three daughters, one of which, Ingrid Gudrun Murray (1905–1980), married lieutenant general Fale Burman in 1951.

== Dates of rank ==
- 1894 – Underlöjtnant
- 1904 – Captain
- 1915 – Major
- 1918 – Lieutenant colonel
- 1924 – Colonel
- 1925 – Major general

== Awards and decorations ==
=== Swedish ===
- (Sweden) King Gustaf V's Jubilee Commemorative Medal (1928)
- (Sweden) Commander 1st Class of the Order of the Sword
- (Sweden) Knight of the Order of the Polar Star
- (Sweden) Knight of the Order of Vasa
- (Sweden) Swedish Military Sports Association's gold medal (Sveriges militära idrottsförbunds guldmedalj)
- (Sweden) Swedish Sports Confederation's badge of merit in gold (Riksidrottsförbundets förtjänsttecken i guld)

=== Foreign ===
- Grand Officer of the Order of the Crown of Italy
- (Belgium) Commander of the Order of the Crown
- (Denmark) Commander Second Class of the Order of the Dannebrog
- Commander Second Class of the Order of the White Rose of Finland
- (France) Commander of the Legion of Honour
- (Norway) Commander Second Class of the Order of St. Olav
- (Tunisia) Commander of the Order of Glory
- (France) Officer of the Order of the Black Star
- (Romania) Officer of the Order of the Crown
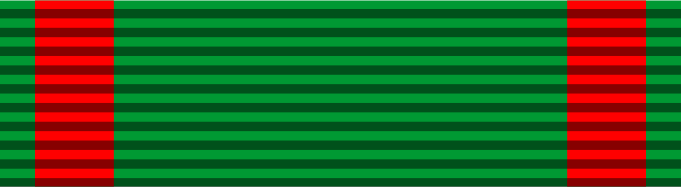
- (Ottoman Empire) Fourth Class of the Order of Osmanieh
- (Ottoman Empire) Fourth Class of the Order of the Medjidie

Military offices
Preceded by First title	Chief of the Air Force; 1925–1931	Succeeded by Eric Virgin
