= Swedish Navy Construction Corps =

- Flottans konstruktionskår
- Active: 1793–1868
- Country: Sweden
- Allegiance: Swedish Armed Forces
- Branch: Swedish Navy
- Type: Administrative corps/Personnel branch
- Role: Naval architecture
- Size: c. 15–20 people

Commanders
- Notable commanders: Johan Aron af Borneman

The Swedish Navy Construction Corps (Swedish: Flottans konstruktionskår) was, during the years 1793–1868, a military organized corps in the Swedish Navy, primarily tasked with creating drawings and proposals related to naval materiel and overseeing work at the Swedish state shipyards.

== History ==
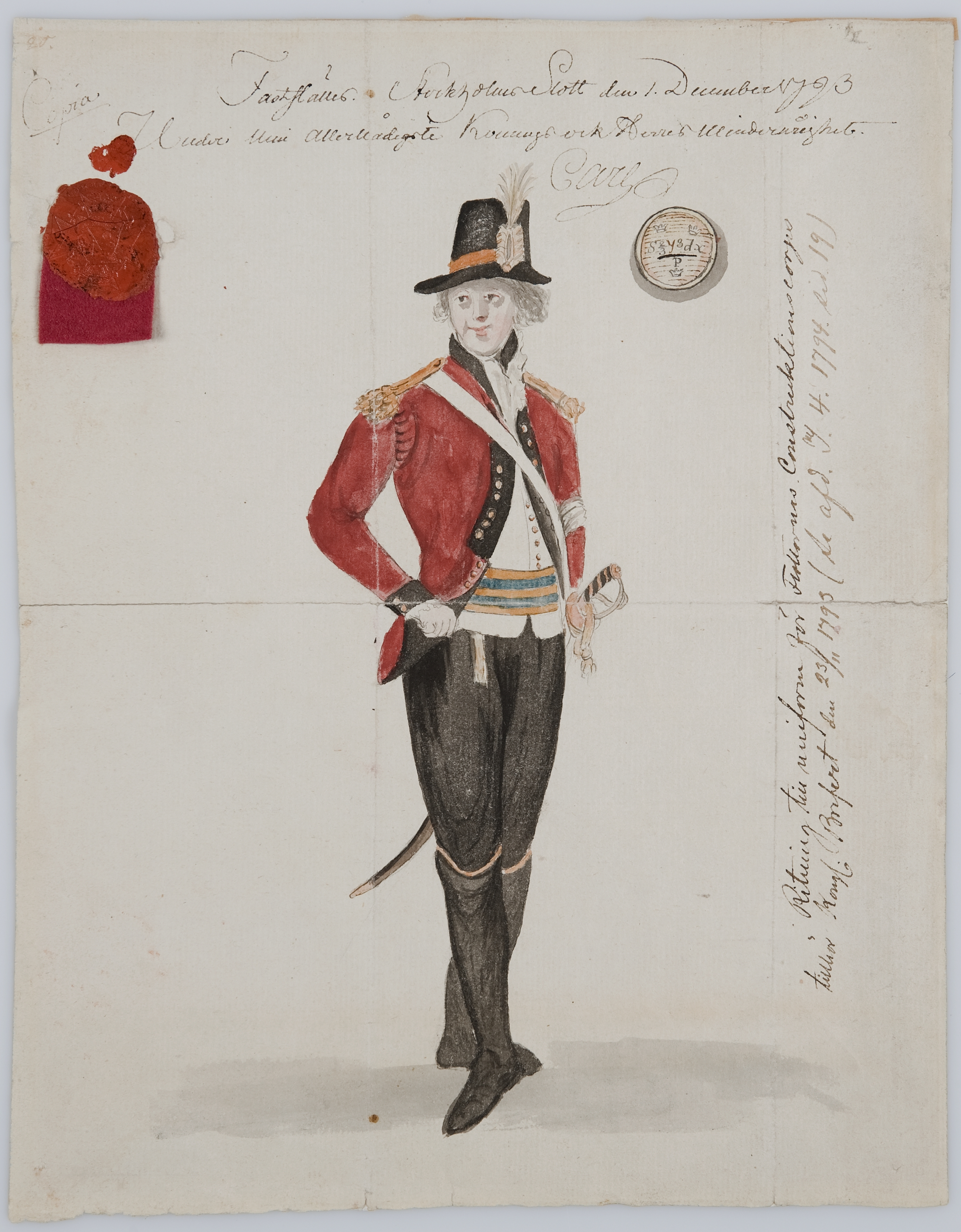
Uniform m/1792 for the Navy Construction Corps. Established in November 1793.

From ancient times, there existed a construction organization within the fleets, consisting of chief shipbuilders, shipbuilders, and assistant shipbuilders. By letters patent on 23 November 1793, this organization was restructured on a military basis, receiving military ranks and hierarchy. Through letters patent on 4 May 1798, it was subsequently ordained that the construction organization in both fleets would be merged and placed under the command of the active adjutant general for the fleets. The corps' numerical strength was determined to be 1 lieutenant colonel, 1 major, 4 captains, 4 lieutenants, and 4 constructors (later called underlöjtnant from 1816).

Upon the amalgamation of the fleets, it was determined by letters patent on 2 November 1824, that the corps would consist of 1 colonel and second-in-command, 1 captain, 4 premiärlöjtnant's, 8 sekundlöjtnant's, 3 assistant constructors, and 3 apprentices. Further specifications were made by letters patent on 22 February 1841, stating that the titles of the mentioned personnel would be changed. Specifically, the four premiärlöjtnant's would be called kaptenlöjtnant's, and the four oldest sekundlöjtnant's would be named premiärlöjtnant'.

The engineering corps existed under the aforementioned organization until the year 1868. As a result of a parliamentary decision in 1867, and letters patent issued on 17 December of the same year in connection with it, a new civilian institution was formed by some of the then construction officers and machinist officers under the name of the Mariningenjörsstaten, which was called the Swedish Naval Engineers' Corps from 1906. The remaining part of the construction officers and machinist officers who were not transferred to the Mariningenjörsstaten were placed on the retired list.

== Heads ==
The head of the corps was a colonel and second-in-command. The second-in-command was to have a seat and a voice in the Administration of Maritime Affairs (Förvaltningen av Sjöärendena), albeit only with the right to vote in cases that he prepared and presented.

- 1794–1814: Lars Nordenbjelke
- 1814–1817: Francis af Sheldon
- 1817–1820: Lars Uhrlin
- 1820–1824: Salomon Sjöbohm
- 1825–1845: Johan Aron af Borneman
- 1845–1847: Jacob Henric d'Ailly
- 1847–1849: Johan Fredrik Ehrenstam
- 1849–1863: Carl Lundquist
- 1863–1868: Axel Ljungstedt

== See also ==
- Swedish Navy Mechanical Corps
