= Göta Engineer Regiment =

Coordinates: 57°40′39″N 14°57′56″E

- Göta ingenjörregemente
- Active: 1878–present
- Country: Sweden
- Allegiance: Swedish Armed Forces
- Branch: Swedish Army
- Type: Engineer
- Size: Regiment
- Part of: 2nd Military District (1878–1893); 2nd Army Division (1893–1901); II Army Division (1902–1927); Eastern Military Division (1928–1936); I Army Division (1937–1942); I. milo (1942–1966); Milo S (1966–2000); OPIL (2000–2004); SAFHQ (2005-)
- Garrison/HQ: Eksjö
- Mottos: Smålands söner – till rikets värn (Note: Inherited from the Northern Småland Regiment (I 12).) ("Småland's sons - to the defense of the kingdom"); Viam inveniam aut faciam ("I will find a way or make one")
- Colors: Black
- March: "Göta ingenjörregementes marsch" (Lundvall) (Note: The march was adopted in the 1890s and established in 1953 by Army Order 33/1953.)
- Battle honours: Varberg (1565), Narva (1581), Breitenfeld (1631), Lützen (1632), Wittstock (1636), Warsaw (1656), Tåget över Bält (1658), Landskrona (1677), Kliszów (1702), Warsaw (1705), Fraustadt (1706), Holovczyn (1708), Malatitze (1708), Helsingborg (1710), Valkeala (1790), Svensksund (1790)

Commanders
- Current commander: COL Emelie Liberg

Insignia
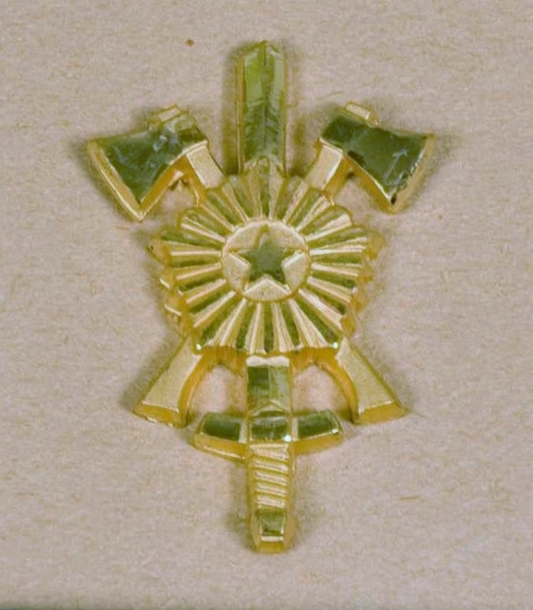
- Branch insignia

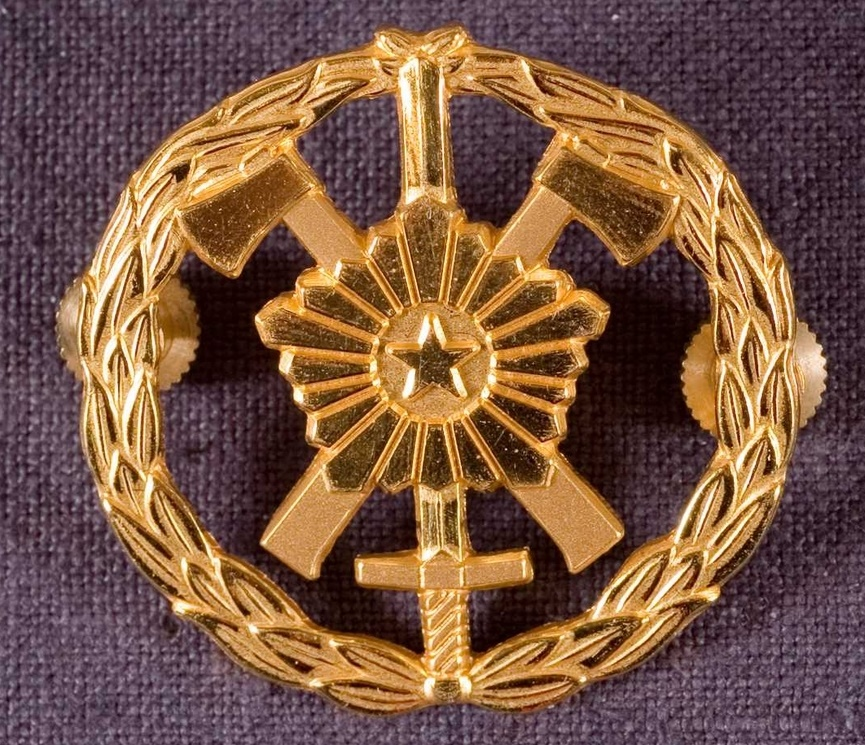
- Cap badge

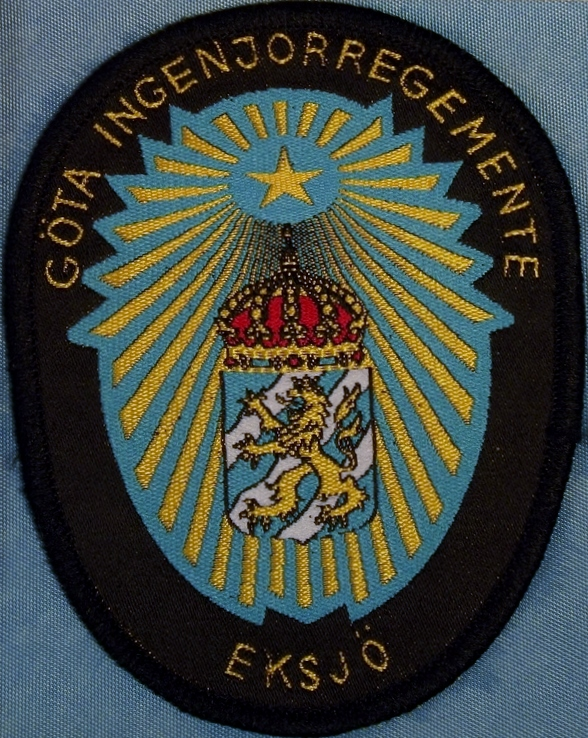
- Shoulder sleeve insignia (1982–1990)

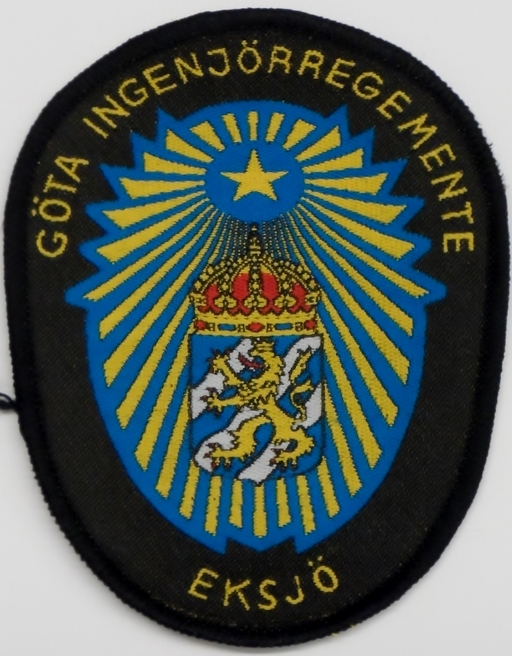
- Shoulder sleeve insignia (1994–)

The Göta Engineer Regiment (Swedish: Göta ingenjörregemente), designation Ing 2, is a Swedish Army engineer regiment that traces its origins back to the 19th century. It is still in active service, and is currently garrisoned in Eksjö.

== History ==
The regiment has its origins in the Sapper Battalion raised between 1873 and 1878. The battalion changed its name in 1893 to the Göta Engineer Battalion, and in 1902 to the Göta Engineer Corps, when it gained the designation Ing 2 (2nd Engineer Regiment). The Göta Engineer Corps was upgraded to a regiment in 1963 and was renamed Göta ingenjörregemente.

It was then downgraded to a battalion unit again in 1994, but six years later in 2000 it was upgraded to a regiment, and regained its old name. The regiment was garrisoned in Stockholm, Karlsborg before it moved to Eksjö in 1928 where it is currently garrisoned.

== Campaigns ==
- None

== Units ==
=== Current units ===
- 21st Engineer Battalion (21. ingenjörbataljonen) is one of the Göta Engineer Regiment's war units. The battalion includes four companies with different orientations; 211th Staff and Support Company (211. stab- och trosskompaniet), 212th Engineer Company (212. ingenjörkompaniet), 213th Machine/Bridge Company (213. maskin/brokompaniet) and the 214th Engineer Company (214. ingenjörkompaniet). The main task of the engineer battalion is to support the combat battalions' battle with field work for mobility, for example mine reconnaissance and mine clearance, and the establishment of temporary connections. Other tasks include fieldwork for survival or other fieldwork such as fortification and munitions clearance. The battalion is equipped with, among other things, the AEV 3 Kodiak (Ingenjörbandvagn 120), the BvS 10, the Patria Pasi and splitter-protected machines. The battalion must be able to carry out qualified field works at all levels of conflict in and outside Sweden. The battalion consists of professional officers and reserve officers. A large part of the soldiers in the 21st Engineer Battalion are full-time employees, but there are also part-time employees serving during exercises and operations. The soldiers have a variety of functions such as general engineering service, ammunition clearing, bridging systems, staff support, maintenance service, medical service, technical service and as driver of heavy vehicles and machines. In addition, there are part-time civilians, mainly doctors and nurses.
- 22nd Engineer Battalion (22. ingenjörbataljonen) is one of the Göta Engineer Regiment's war units. The battalion includes four companies with different orientations; 221st Staff and Support Company (221. stab- och trosskompaniet), 222nd Engineer Company (222. ingenjörkompaniet), 223rd Machine/Bridge Company (223. maskin/brokompaniet) and the 224th Engineer Company (224. ingenjörkompaniet). The main task of the engineer battalion is to support the combat battalions' battle with field work for mobility, for example mine reconnaissance and mine clearance, and the establishment of temporary connections. Other tasks include fieldwork for survival or other fieldwork such as fortification and munitions clearance. The battalion is equipped with, among other things, the AEV 3 Kodiak (Ingenjörbandvagn 120), the BvS 10, the Patria Pasi and splitter-protected machines. The battalion must be able to carry out qualified field works at all levels of conflict in and outside Sweden. The battalion consists of professional officers and reserve officers. The soldiers in the 22nd Engineer Battalion are mainly part-time employees who serve during exercises and operation. The soldiers have a variety of functions such as general engineering service, ammunition clearing, bridging systems, staff support, maintenance service, medical service, technical service and as driver of heavy vehicles and machines. In addition, there are part-time civilians, mainly doctors and nurses.
- 33rd Home Guard Battalion (33. hemvärnsbataljonen) also called the Northern Småland Battalion (Norra Smålandsbataljonens) is a Home Guard battalion whose area includes Jönköping County. The majority of all personnel in the unit are resident in the catchment area. The battalion belongs to the Göta Engineer Regiment (Ing 2). The battalion include to a pioneer platoon, the first of the four existing ones raised. The platoon can carry out a variety of forms of field work, including mine reconnaissance, fortification work, blasting, and building connections with military bridges. The battalion also has an aviation group that, with the help of smaller aircraft, gives the battalion invaluable intelligence via observations from the air. The aviation group can also make quick transports of personnel and important equipment. The unit has two associated music bands and its most important tasks are state ceremonial activities such as playing at the guard parade and the changing of the Royal Guards at Stockholm Palace. The battalion is administered and trained by the Northern Småland Group (Norra Smålandsgruppen), which is grouped with other military activities within Eksjö Garrison. The commanding officer of the Northern Småland Group is directly subordinate to the regimental commander of Göta Engineer Regiment (Ing 2). The current tasks of the Northern Småland Group are to train and administer Home Guard units in Jönköping County. The group will also support voluntary defense organizations and be prepared to lead operations to support society in general.
- Swedish Army Field Work School (Fältarbetsskolan) is a part of Göta Engineer Regiment and is responsible for training engineer and pioneer officers for the operational organization, for tasks both nationally and internationally. The school also develops new field work equipment as well as new organizations and methods, primarily for the engineer battalions. The school also manages experimental activities regarding new equipment and organizations with the aim of developing future operational organizations.

== Heraldry and traditions ==
=== Colours, standards and guidons ===
Göta Engineer Regiment presents one regimental colour and one traditional colour.

==== The 1935 colour ====
The traditional colour is drawn by Mrs Westberg and embroidered by hand in insertion technique by the company Libraria. The colour was presented to the then Royal Göta Engineer Corps (Ing 2) at the 300-years anniversary of the Swedish Fortification Corps in Stockholm by His Majesty the King Gustaf V on 26 September 1935. Blazon: "On blue cloth in the centre the lesser coat of arms of Sweden, three yellow crowns placed two and one. In the first corner a mullet with a cluster of rays, all yellow. In the lower part of the rays the coat-of-arms of the regiment; azure, on three bends wavy sinister argent, a crowned lion rampant or, armed gules. The shield ensigned with a royal crown proper."

==== The 2006 colour ====
A new colour was presented by Supreme Commander Håkan Syrén on 10 August 2006. The new colour has three crowns and the Göta Engineer Regiment's mark written on a black bottom, with the regiment's battle honours at the top of the colour. Previously, the regiment carried two colours. This was due to Ing 2 took over the colour of the Småland Regiment (I 12) at its disbandment on 30 June 2000. It was then carried parallel with the Göta Engineer Regiment's old colour. The battle honours on the new colour were taken over from Småland Regiment.

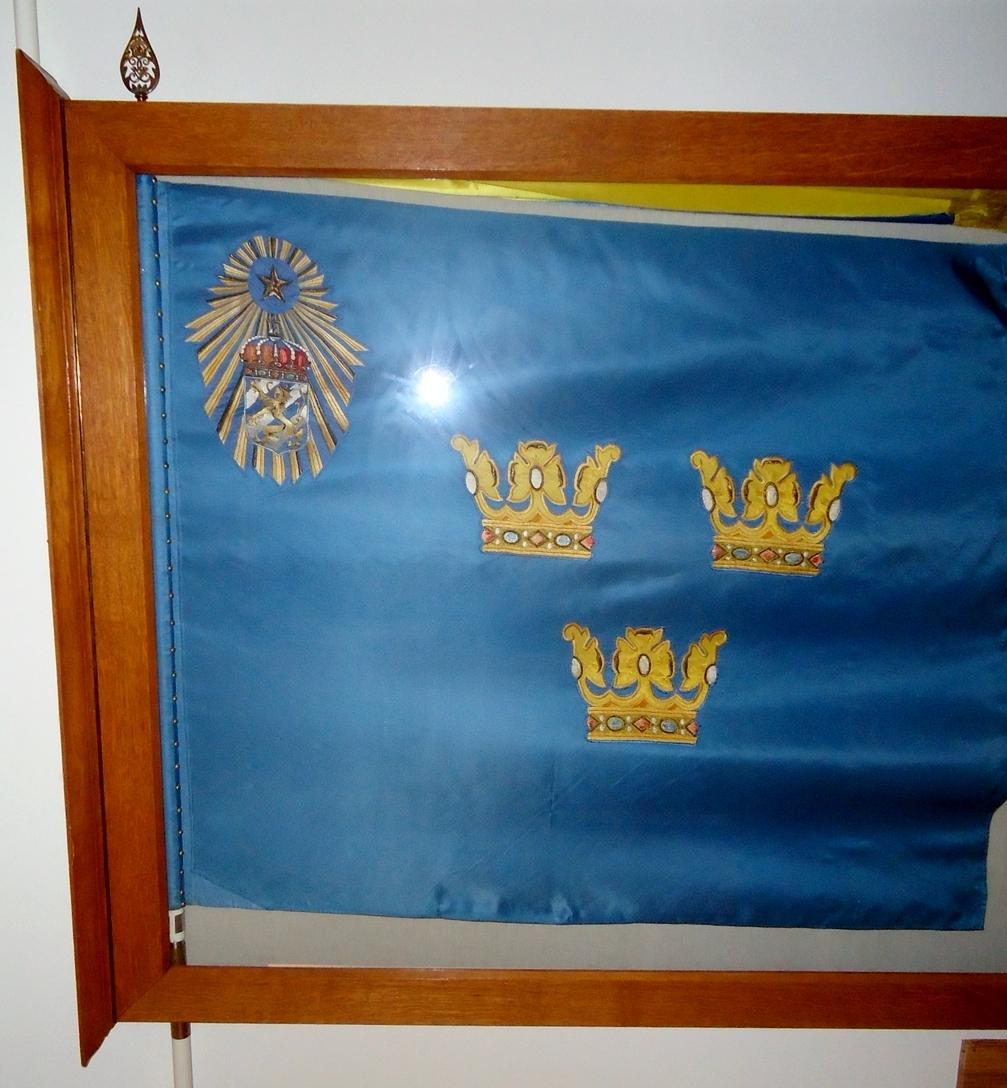
The 1935 colour

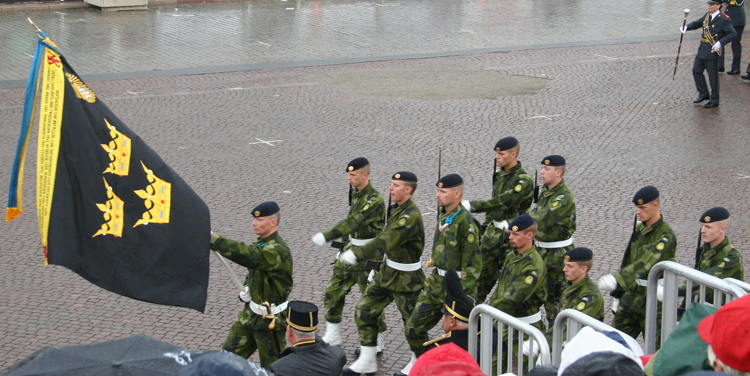
The 2006 colour.

=== Coat of arms ===
The coat of the arms of the Göta Engineer Regiment (Ing 2) 1977–1994, the Göta Engineer Corps (Ing 2) 1994–2000 and Göta Engineer Regiment (Ing 2) since 2000. Blazon: "Azur, the regimental badge, three waves bendy-sinister argent, charged with a double-tailed crowned lion rampant or, armed and langued gules. The shield surmounted a cluster of rays coming down from a mullet, or".

== Commanding officers ==
Regimental commanders active from 1878.

- 1878-1881: Major Hjalmar Stålhane
- 1881-1890: Lieutenant Colonel Wilhelm Stolpe
- 1890-1895: Major C.D. Ludvig W:son Munthe
- 1895-1898: Major Hans Ahlmann
- 1898-1903: Lieutenant Colonel Erik Gustaf Kinell
- 1903-1904: Major Broder Sten A:son Leijonhufvud
- 1904-1910: Lieutenant Colonel August Fredrik Thorsell
- 1910-1915: Colonel Gustaf Enblom
- 1915-1917: Lieutenant Colonel Ernst Adrian Eriksson
- 1917-1922: Lieutenant Colonel Fredrik Georg Rudman Bergenstråhle
- 1922-1926: Colonel Gustaf Julius Rabe
- 1926-1934: Colonel Sven Erik Bjuggren
- 1934-1937: Lieutenant Colonel Carl Anders Sigurd Rahmqvist
- 1937-1940: Lieutenant Colonel Åke Edward Grönhagen
- 1940-1941: Colonel Gunnar Edward Ström
- 1941-1946: Colonel Inge Gustaf Hellgren
- 1946-1947: Colonel Nils Fredrik Wilhelm Ekman
- 1947-1954: Colonel Helge Porse Robert Geete
- 1954-1957: Colonel Arne Mohlin
- 1957-1964: Colonel Björn Gustaf Adolf Berg
- 1964-1966: Colonel Gunnar Nordlöf
- 1966-1969: Colonel Erik Olof Sigvard Månsson
- 1969-1978: Colonel Lars Anders Andersson
- 1978-1980: Colonel Sten Ahlström
- 1980-1982: Colonel Sven-Erik Anton Nilsson
- 1982-1984: Colonel Lars-Åke Persson
- 1984-1990: Colonel Carl Gösta Edholm
- 1990-1992: Colonel Bertil Christer Ljung
- 1993-1997: Colonel Jan-Erik Björn Svensson
- 1997-2000: Colonel Karl Erik Lennart Bengtsson
- 2000-2003: Colonel Bengt Axelsson
- 2003-2006: Colonel Anders Stenström
- 2006-2011: Colonel Tommy Karlsson
- 2011-2013: Colonel Gustaf Fahl
- 2013–2016: Colonel Patrik Ahlgren
- 2016–2022: Colonel Michael Ginér
- 2022–2025: Colonel Per Åkerblom
- 2025–present: Colonel Emelie Liberg

== Names, designations and locations ==
| Name | Translation | From | | To |
|---|---|---|---|---|
| Kungl Sappörkompaniet | Royal Sapper Company | 1873 | – | 1876 |
| Kungl Sappörtruppen | Royal Sapper Troops | 1876 | – | 1878 |
| Kungl Sappörbataljonen | Royal Sapper Battalion | 1878 | – | 1892-12-31 |
| Kungl Göta ingenjörbataljon | Royal Göta Engineer Battalion | 1893-01-01 | – | 1901-12-31 |
| Kungl Göta ingenjörkår | Royal Göta Engineer Corps | 1902-01-01 | – | 1963-06-30 |
| Kungl Göta ingenjörregemente | Royal Göta Engineer Regiment | 1963-07-01 | – | 1974-12-31 |
| Göta ingenjörregemente | Göta Engineer Regiment | 1975-01-01 | – | 1994-06-30 |
| Göta ingenjörkår | Göta Engineer Corps | 1994-07-01 | – | 2000-06-30 |
| Göta ingenjörregemente | Göta Engineer Regiment; Göta Engineers | 2000-07-01 | – | |
| Designation | | From | | To |
| Ing 2 | | 1902-01-01 | – | |
| Location | | From | | To |
| Stockholm Garrison | | 1873 | – | 1875 |
| Karlsborg Garrison | | 1875 | – | 1928-03-31 |
| Eksjö Garrison | | 1928-04-01 | – | |

== See also ==
- List of Swedish engineer regiments
