= Norrland Engineer Battalion =

- Norrlands ingenjörbataljon
- Active: 1905–2004
- Country: Sweden
- Allegiance: Swedish Armed Forces
- Branch: Swedish Army
- Type: Engineer
- Size: Battalion
- Part of: VI Army Division (1902–1927); Upper Norrland's Troops (1928–1942); VI Military District (1942–1966); Upper Norrland Military District (1966–1993); Northern Military District (1993–2000); Norrbotten Regiment (2000–2004)
- Garrison/HQ: Boden
- Motto: Nos nihil efficere non possumus ("Here are no impossibilities")
- Colors: Black
- March: "Bodens ingenjörkårs marsch" (Widqvist) (Note: The march was adopted on 25 September 1922 and was established in 1953 by Army Order 33/1953.)
- Anniversaries: 24 October (Note: In memory of the Lake Armasjärvi disaster on 24 October 1940.)

Insignia
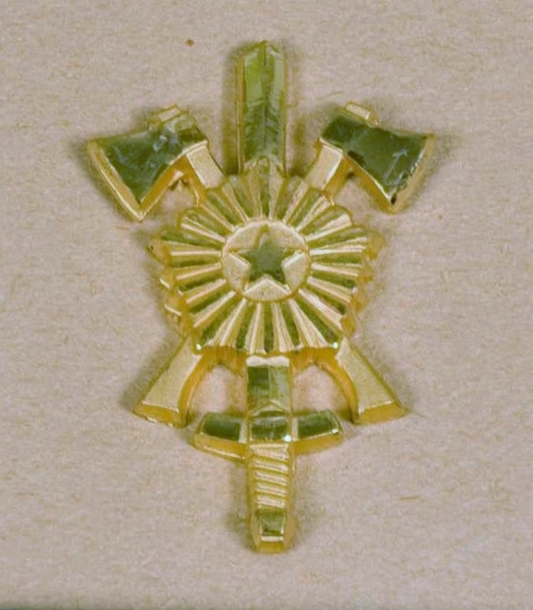
- Branch insignia

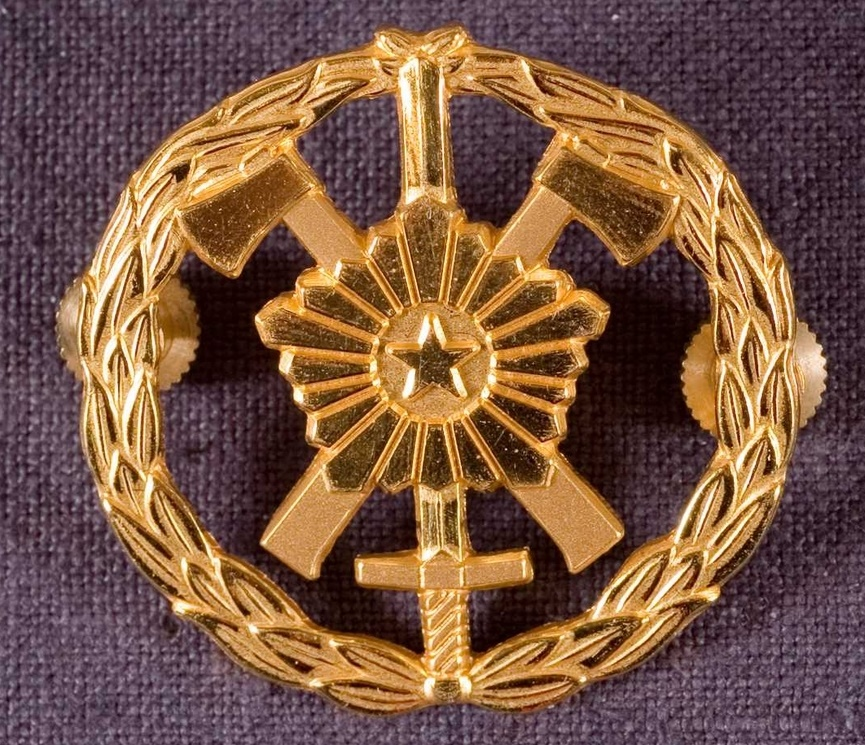
- Cap badge

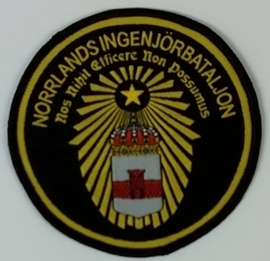
- Shoulder sleeve insignia

The Norrland Engineer Battalion (Swedish: Norrlands ingenjörbataljon), designation Ingbat/I 19, originally Boden Engineer Regiment (Swedish: Bodens ingenjörkår), designation Ing 3, was a Swedish Army engineer unit, one of the few new formations raised in the 20th century. It was disbanded in 2005. The unit was garrisoned in Boden, Sweden.

== History ==
The unit has its origins in the engineer companies created at Norrbotten Regiment in 1902. These companies became independent in 1904 as Boden Engineer Corps and gained the designation Ing 4 (4th Engineer Regiment). Boden Engineer Corps gained the new designation Ing 3 in 1937 and was upgraded to a regiment in 1975 and was renamed Boden Engineer Regiment.

It was then downgraded to a battalion unit again in 1994, and was renamed Norrland Engineer Corps. In 2000, the battalion became one of five battalions in Norrbotten Regiment, with the name Norrland Engineer Battalion, the designation Ing 3 was not kept, even though it was still in common use. The battalion was disbanded in 2005.

== Campaigns ==
- None

== Organisation ==
- ?

== Heraldry and traditions ==
=== Colours, standards and guidons ===
At the 300th anniversary of the Swedish Fortification Corps on 26 September 1935, His Majesty the King Gustav V presented a colour to the then Boden Engineer Corps. On 1 January 1998, the colour of Svea Engineer Corps was transferred to Norrland Engineer Corps after Svea Engineer Corps was disbanded on 31 December 1997. A new colour was presented to the then Norrland Engineer Battalion in Boden by His Majesty the King Carl XVI Gustaf on 27 August 2001. It was drawn by Kristina Holmgård-Åkerberg and embroidered by machine and hand (the badge) in insertion technique by the company Libraria. The colour may be used according to the decisions of CO I 19. Blazon: "On blue cloth in the centre the lesser coat of arms of Sweden, three yellow crowns placed two and one. In the first corner a mullet with a cluster of rays, all in yellow. In the lower part of this the coat of arms of the unit; argent, throughout a wall with a gatetower both embattled gules (the original name of the battalion was Royal Boden Engineers Regiment, Ing 3); on a chief azure three open crowns in fess or (a legacy from the former Svea Engineer Regiment, Ing 1). The shield ensigned with a royal crown proper. After the battalion was disbanded, the colour was carried by Norrland Engineer Company at Norrbotten Regiment until the company was disbanded on 21 June 2011.

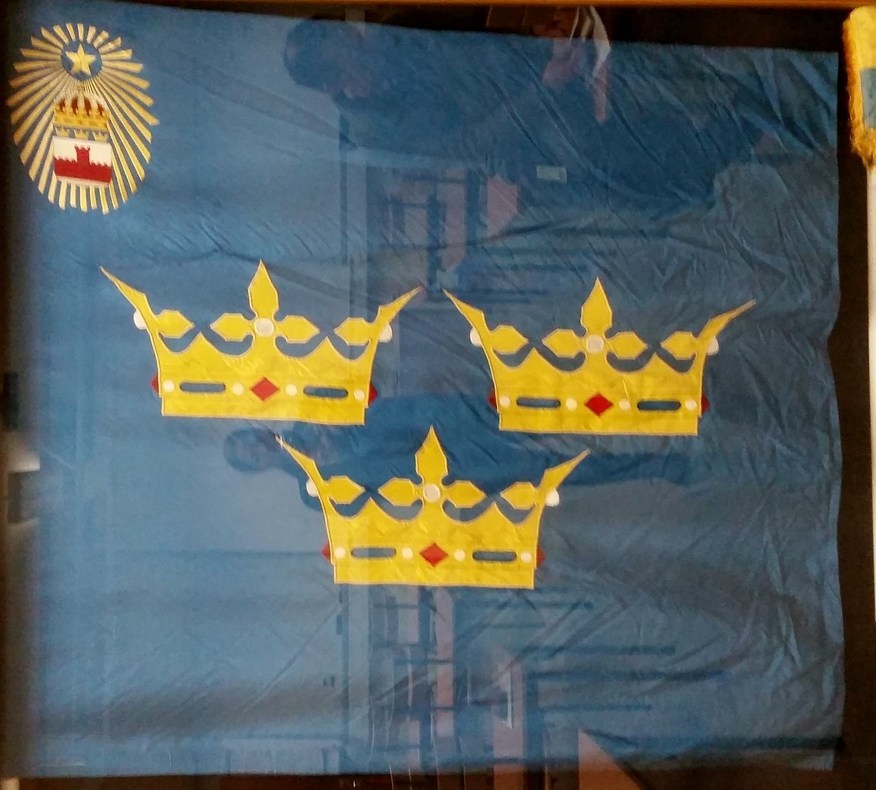
2001 colour

=== Coat of arms ===
The coat of the arms of the Boden Engineer Regiment (Ing 3) 1977–1994, the Norrland Engineer Corps (Ing 3) 1994–2000 and the Norrland Engineer Battalion (Ingbat/I 19) 2000–2004. Blazon: "Argent, the town badge of Boden, a wall throughout embattled gules with a gatetower, mansoned in the first colour. The shield surmounted a cluster of rays coming down from a mullet, or".

=== Medals ===
Prior to the disbandment on 30 June 2000, the Norrlands ingenjörkårs (Ing 3) minnesmedalj ("Norrland Engineer Corps (Ing 3) Commemorative Medal") in silver (NorrlingSMM) of the 8th size was established. The medal ribbon was divided in black, blue and black moiré. Prior to the disbandment of the battalion on 26 August 2005, the Norrlands ingenjörbataljons minnesmedalj ("Norrland Engineer Battalion Commemorative Medal") in silver (NorrlingbatMSM) of the 8th size was established. The medal ribbon was black with blue edges followed by a yellow stripe.

== Commanding officers ==
Regimental commander as well as battalion and corps commander from 1905 to 2005. Commanding officers from 1905 to 1973 and from 1994 to 2000 were called "corps commander". Commanding officers from 1973 to 1994 were called "regimental commander" and from 2000 to 2005 the commanding officers were called "battalion commander".

- 1905–1907: Emil Sebastian von Krusenstjerna
- 1907–1914: Olof Kullberg
- 1914–1916: Henri Leopold de Champs
- 1916–1920: Axel Norinder
- 1920–1926: Per Albin Dihlström
- 1926–1928: Ove Sylvan
- 1928–1931: Sven Alin
- 1931–1934: Ebbe Tydén
- 1934–1937: Gunnar Ström
- 1937–1940: Åke Grönhagen
- 1940–1941: Inge Hellgren
- 1941–1941: Anders Walter Graûmann
- 1941–1948: Wilhelm Dahlgren
- 1948–1953: Stig Berggren
- 1953–1959: Nils Rabe
- 1959–1973: Tore Rahmqvist
- 1973–1979: Owe Karl-Gösta Dahl
- 1979–1982: Hans Carlsson
- 1982–1983: Karl Oskar Sigurd Henningsson (acting)
- 1983–1991: Karl Oscar Bertil Alm
- 1991–1993: Sören Stegius
- 1994–1994: Anders Andersson (acting)
- 1994–1996: Jan-Gunnar Isberg
- 1996–1998: Bo Sören Ericson
- 1998–2000: Gunnar Söderström
- 2000–2002: Roger Olsson
- 2002–2004: Anders Widuss
- 2004–2005: Björn Sundström

== Names, designations and locations ==
Name	Translation	From		To
Kungliga Bodens ingenjörkår	Royal Boden Engineer Corps	1905-04-01	–	1974-12-31
Bodens ingenjörkår	Boden Engineer Corps	1975-01-01	–	1975-06-30
Bodens ingenjörregemente	Boden Engineer Regiment	1975-07-01	–	1994-06-30
Norrlands ingenjörkår	Norrland Engineer Corps	1994-07-01	–	2000-06-30
Norrlands ingenjörbataljon	Norrland Engineer Battalion	2000-07-01	–	2004-12-31
Avvecklingsorganisation	Decommissioning Organisation	2005-01-01	–	2005-08-31
Norrlands ingenjörkompani	Norrland Engineer Company	2005-09-01	–	2011-12-31
Designation		From		To
Ing 4		1905-04-01	–	1937-06-30
Ing 3		1937-07-01	–	2000-06-30
Ingbat/I 19		2000-07-01	–	2005-08-31
Ingkomp/I 19		2005-09-01	–	2011-12-31
Location		From		To
Luleå/Notviken		1902-05-12	–	1904-05-01
Boden Garrison		1904-04-01	–	2011-12-31

== See also ==
- List of Swedish engineer regiments
