= Svea Engineer Corps =

Former Swedish military establishment

- Svea ingenjörkår
- Active: 1855–1997
- Country: Sweden
- Allegiance: Swedish Armed Forces
- Branch: Swedish Army
- Type: Engineer
- Size: Corps
- Part of: List: 4th Military District (1855–1893); 4th Army Division (1893–1901); IV Army Division (1902–1927); Eastern Army Division (1928–1936); IV Army Division (1937–1942); IV. milo (1942–1966); Milo Ö (1966–1991); Milo M (1991–1997)
- Garrison/HQ: Almnäs
- Mottos: Över och genom alla hinder ("Over and through all obstacles")
- Colors: Black
- March: "På vakt" (Rydberg) (Note: The march was adopted on 18 March 1970. It replaced "Svea ingenjörkårs marsch" (Johnsson).)

Insignia
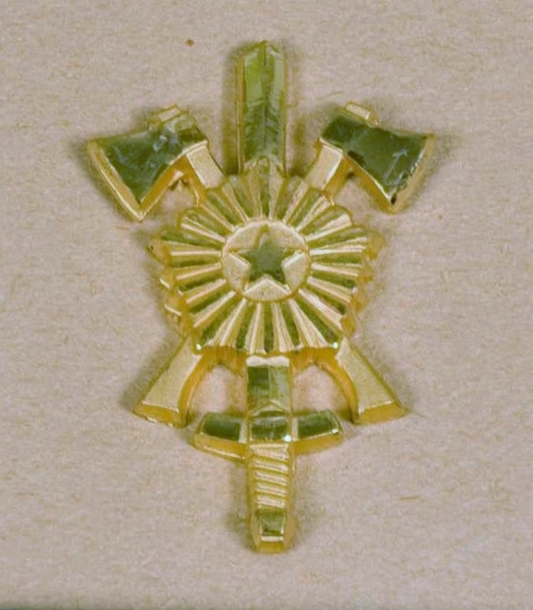
- Branch insignia

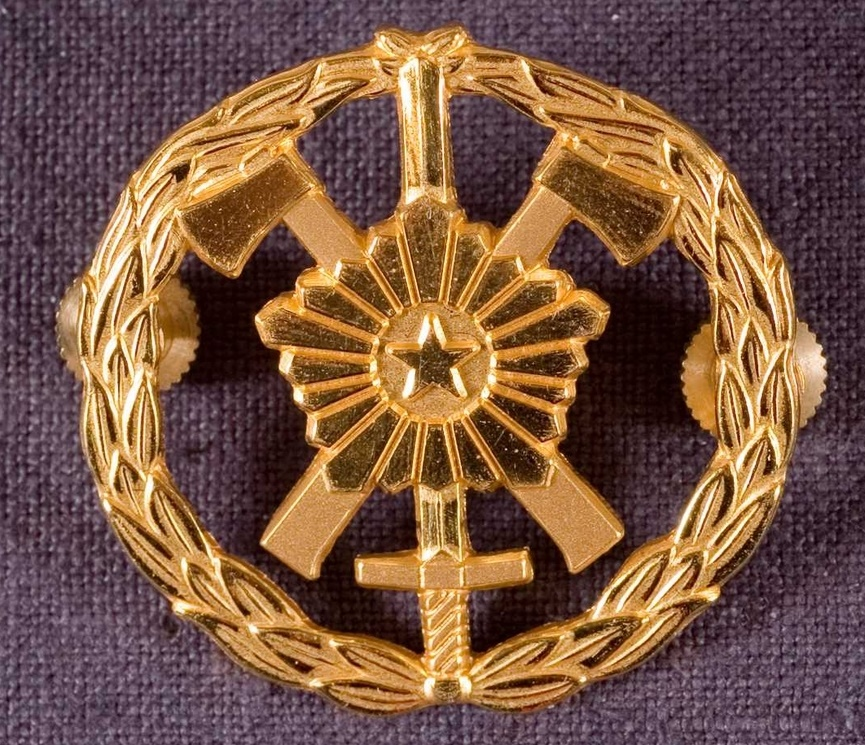
- Cap badge

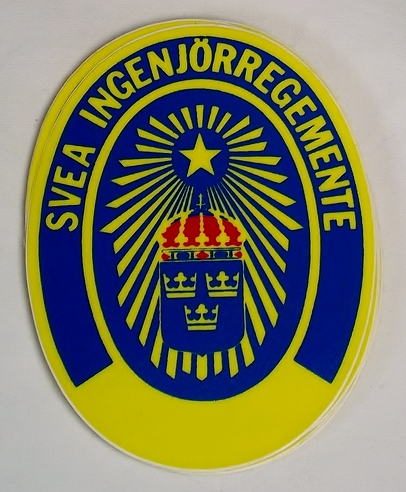
- Shoulder sleeve insignia

The Svea Engineer Corps (Swedish: Svea ingenjörkår), designation Ing 1, was a Swedish Army engineer unit that traced its origins back to the 19th century. It was disbanded in 1997. The unit was garrisoned in Uppland and Södermanland.

== History ==
The unit has its origins in Sapper Company raised in 1855. The company was reorganised to a battalion-sized unit in 1864 and was renamed Sapper Corps. This unit was transformed to a pontoon bridge battalion, Pontoon Battalion, in 1867. The battalion then changed its name once again in 1893 to Svea Engineer Battalion, and in 1902 to Svea Engineer Corps, when it gained the designation Ing 1 (1st Engineer Regiment). That same year, the field telegraphy company that had been attached to the unit became independent and later formed Uppland Regiment.

Svea Engineer Corps was upgraded to a regiment in 1957 and was renamed Svea Engineer Regiment. It was then downgraded to a battalion unit again in 1994, just three years before the unit was disbanded, in 1997. The regiment was garrisoned in Stockholm, Solna and Södertälje during its lifetime.

== Organisation ==
- ?

== Heraldry and traditions ==
=== Coat of arms ===
The coat of the arms of the Svea Engineer Regiment (Ing 1) 1977–1994 and the Svea Engineer Corps (Ing 1) 1994–1997. Blazon: "Azure, the lesser coat of arms of Sweden, three open crowns placed two and one The shield surmounted a cluster of rays coming down from a mullet, or".

=== Colours, standards and guidons ===
The colour of Ing 2 was presented on 26 September 1935 by His Majestyg the King Gustaf V at the 300th Anniversary of the Swedish Fortification Corps in Stockholm. It was carried from 1 January 1998 by the Norrland Engineer Corps. When the colour was taken out of use, it was not handed over to the Swedish Army Museum but was exhibited at Ing 1's museum on Laxön. The colour couldn't therefore be admitted to the Swedish Army Museum collection until 2012.

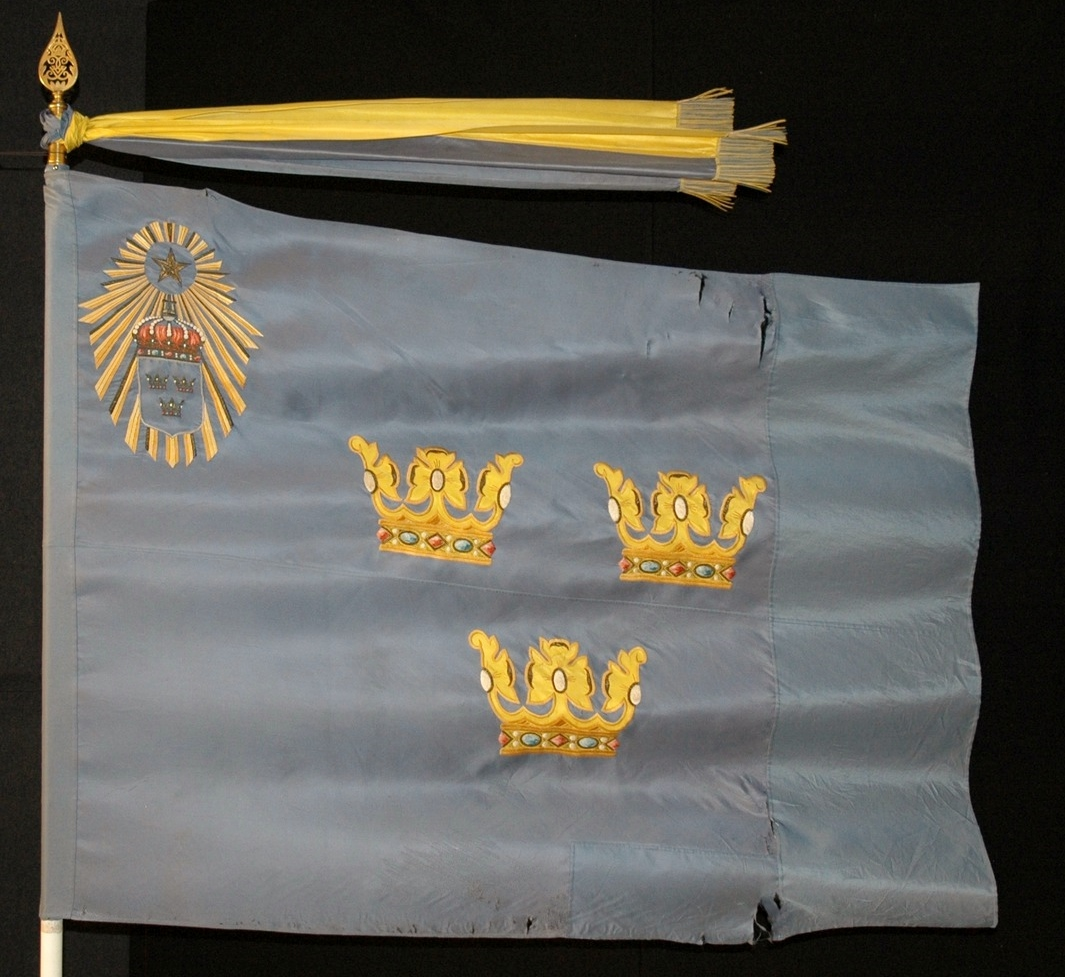
The 1935 colour

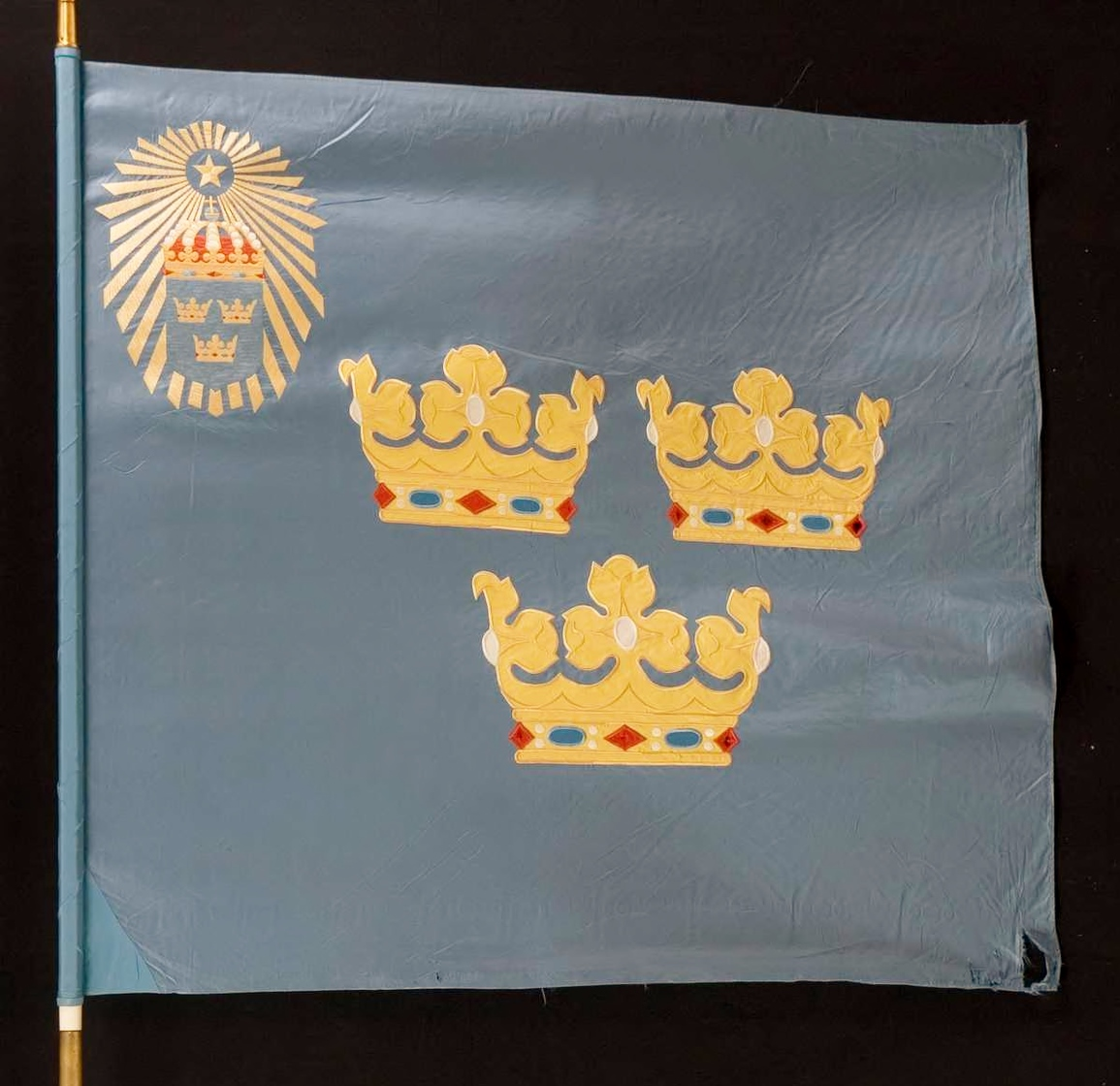
The 1969 colour

=== Medals ===
In 1997, Svea ingenjörskårs (Ing 1) minnesmedalj ("Svea Engineer Corps (Ing 1) Commemorative Medal") i silver (SveaingSMM) of the 8th size was established. The medal is oval and the medal ribbon is divided in black, yellow and black moiré.

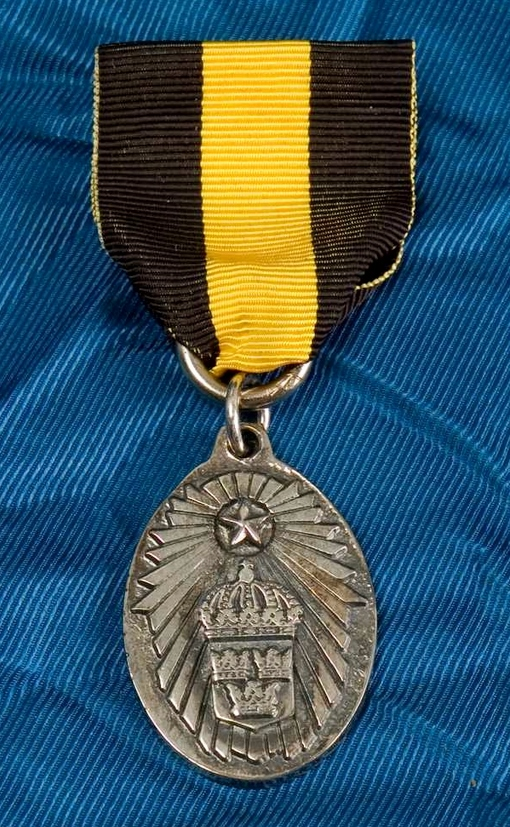
Svea Engineer Corps (Ing 1) Commemorative Medal

== Commanding officers ==
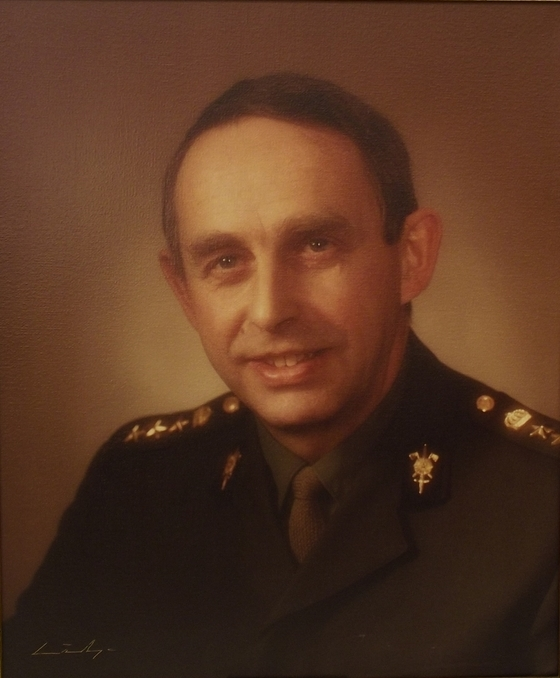
Colonel Bengt Gustafsson, commander from 1981 to 1982.

Regimental commanders and battalion and corps commanders between 1900 and 1997.

- 1900–1904: Nils Gustaf Stedt (also commander of the Field Telegraph Corps (Ing 3).
- 1904–1910: Georg Juhlin-Dannfelt
- 1910–1915: August Fredrik Thorssell
- 1915–1915: Hjalmar Ertman Smitt
- 1915–1920: Erik Conrad Eriksson
- 1920–1924: Karl Amundson
- 1924–1926: Sven Erik Bjurgren
- 1926–1931: Gustaf Julius Rabe
- 1931–1934: Sven Alin
- 1934–1941: Sven Eberhard Tydén
- 1941–1941: Gunnar Edward Ström
- 1941–1948: Anders Walther Graûmann
- 1948–1953: Wilhelm Gottlieb Dahlgren
- 1953–1959: Axel Welin
- 1959–1965: Nils Christian Rabe
- 1965–1969: Åke Bernström
- 1969–1975: Kåre Svanfeldt
- 1975–1981: Anders Jonsson
- 1981–1982: Bengt Gustafsson
- 1982–1984: Sven-Erik Nilsson
- 1984–1989: Lars-Åke Persson
- 1989–1989: Carl Göran Gerhard De Geer
- 1989–1990: Björn Falkenström (acting)
- 1990–1994: Björn Falkenström
- 1994–1997: Christer Wulff

== Names, designations and locations ==
Name	Translation	From		To
Kungl Sappörkompaniet	Royal Sapper Company	1855	–	1864
Kungl Sappörkåren	Royal Sapper Corps	1864	–	1866-12-31
Kungl Pontonjärbataljonen	Royal Pontoon Battalion	1867-01-01	–	1892-12-31
Kungl Svea ingenjörbataljon	Royal Svea Engineer Battalion	1893-01-01	–	1901-12-31
Kungl Svea ingenjörkår	Royal Svea Engineer Corps	1902-01-01	–	1957-06-30
Kungl Svea ingenjörregemente	Royal Svea Engineer Regiment	1957-07-01	–	1974-12-31
Svea ingenjörregemente	Svea Engineer Regiment	1975-01-01	–	1994-06-30
Svea ingenjörkår	Svea Engineer Corps	1994-07-01	–	1997-12-31
Designation		From		To
Ing 1		1902-01-01	–	1997-12-31
Location		From		To
Stockholm		1855	–	1922-11-29
Frösunda		1922-11-30	–	1970-06-30
Almnäs Garrison		1970-07-01	–	1997-12-31

== See also ==
- List of Swedish engineer regiments
