= Field Telegraph Corps =

Engineering unit of the Swedish Armed Forces

- Fälttelegrafkåren
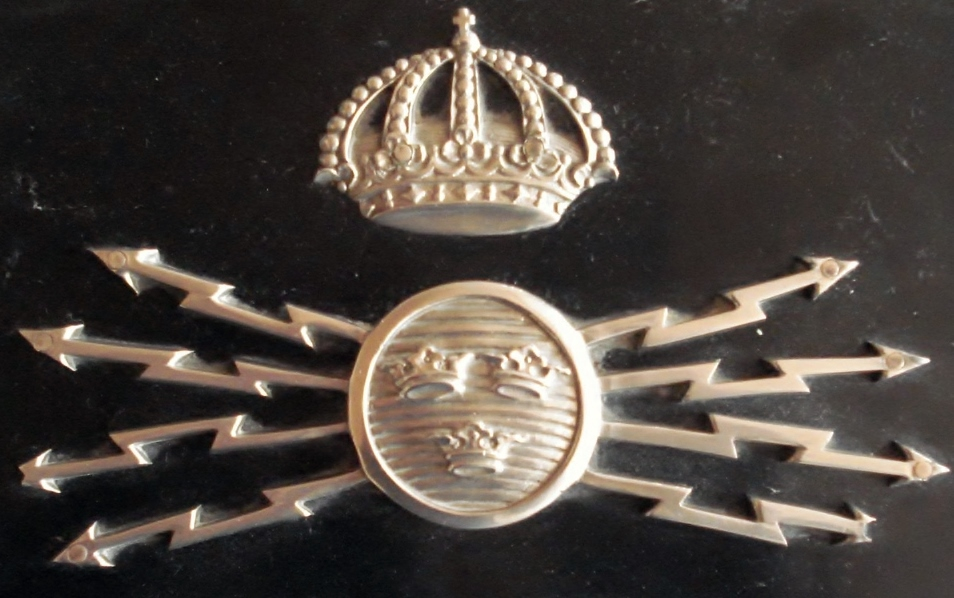
- Active: 1902–1937
- Country: Sweden
- Allegiance: Swedish Armed Forces
- Branch: Swedish Army
- Type: Engineering
- Size: Corps
- Part of: Pontoon Battalion (1875–1892); Svea Engineer Battalion (1893–1901); Svea Engineer Corps (1902–1907); IV Army Division (1908–1927); Eastern Army Division (1928–1936); IV Army Division (1937–1937)
- Garrison/HQ: Stockholm

Field Telegraph Corps (Swedish: Fälttelegrafkåren), designation Ing 3, was a Swedish engineering unit within the Swedish Armed Forces which served in various forms between 1902 and 1937. The main part of the unit was located in the Stockholm Garrison in Stockholm, Uppland.

== History ==
The Field Telegraph Corps was established in 1902 and was organized by the Fields Telegraph Company of the Svea Engineer Battalion, in connection with the battalion's reorganization into Svea Engineer Corps, together with a newly established Field Telegraph Company. The unit changed after a few years the designation to Ing 3. A detachment from the Field Telegraph Corps was during the years 1912-1916 deployed at Axevalla heath and Malmen and formed the backbone of the army air force. The detachment was reorganized in 1916 into the Field Telegraph Corps' 5th Company, the Air Company, which was deployed at Malmen from 1916 to 1926 when the Swedish Air Force was established.

In the Signal Workshop in Sundbyberg (Signalverkstaden i Sundbyberg, SIS) was included in the Field Telegraph Corps, which in 1940 added the newly established Defense Department's Engineering Committee (Försvarsväsendets verkstadsnämnd).

The Field Telegraph Corps was disbanded in 1937 and formed the backbone of the Signal Regiment (S 1).

== 1914 organisation ==
In accordance with the 1914 Defense Resolution the Field Telegraph Corps consisted of:

- Staff based in Marieberg on Kungsholmen in Stockholm
- 2 Field Telegraph Companies
- 1 Park Company
- 1 Ordnance Company
- 1 Radio Company based at Järvafältet
- 1 Balloon Company based at Järvafältet
- 1 Air Company based at Malmslätt

== Commanding officers ==
Commanders of the Field Telegraph Corps:

- 1902–1904: Nils Gustaf Stedt
- 1904–1910: Georg Frans Herman Julius Juhlin-Dannfelt
- 1907–1912: Broder Sten A:son Leijonhufvud
- 1912–1915: Adolf Murray
- 1915–1920: Karl Amundson
- 1920–1924: Conrad Erikson
- 1924–1925: Karl Amundson
- 1925–1928: Eggert Nauclér
- 1928–1932: Torsten Friis
- 1932–1937: Gottfried Hain

== Names, designations and locations ==
| Name | Translation | From | | To |
|---|---|---|---|---|
| Fältsignalkompaniet | Field Signal Company | 1871-11-01 | – | 1893-02-27 |
| Fälttelegrafkompaniet | Field Telegraph Company | 1893-02-28 | – | 1901-12-31 |
| Kungl. Fälttelegrafkåren | Royal Field Telegraph Corps | 1902-01-01 | – | 1937-06-30 |
| Designation | | From | | To |
| Ing 3 | | 1914-10-01 | – | 1937-06-30 |
| Location | | From | | To |
| Stockholm Garrison | | 1902-01-01 | – | 1937-06-30 |
