= Harlösa =

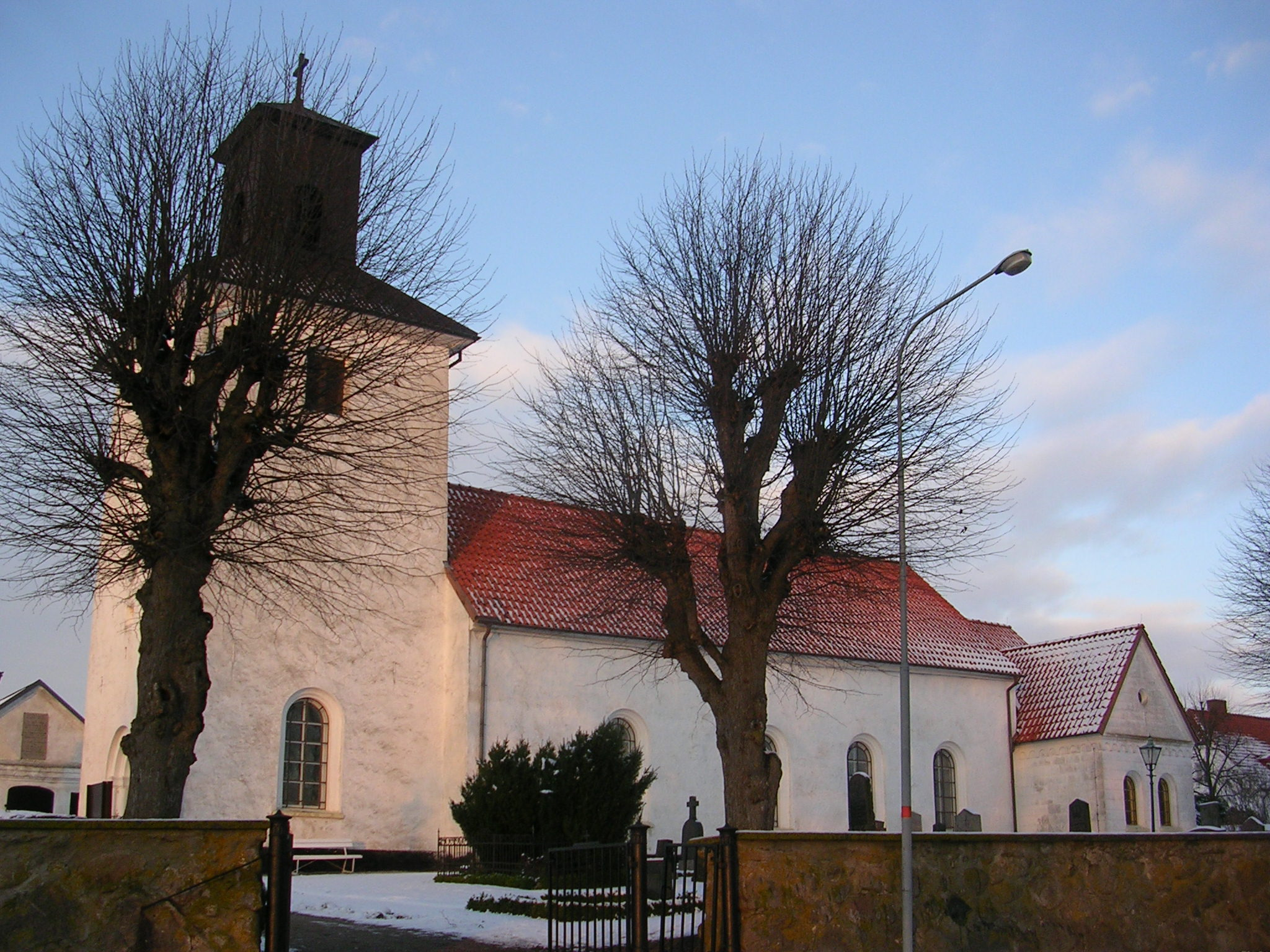
- Harlösa Church

- Location within Skåne Location within Sweden
- Coordinates: 55°43′N 13°32′E
- Country: Sweden
- Province: Skåne
- County: Skåne County
- Municipality: Eslöv Municipality

Area
  - Total: 0.78 km^{2} (0.30 sq mi)

Population (31 December 2010)
  - Total: 763
  - Density: 979/km^{2} (2,540/sq mi)
- Time zone: UTC+1 (CET)
  - Summer (DST): UTC+2 (CEST)

Harlösa is a locality situated in Eslöv Municipality, Skåne County, Sweden with 763 inhabitants in 2010.

The football club, Harlösa IF, is based in Harlösa.
