= Carl Eric Almgren =

Swedish Army officer (1913–2001)

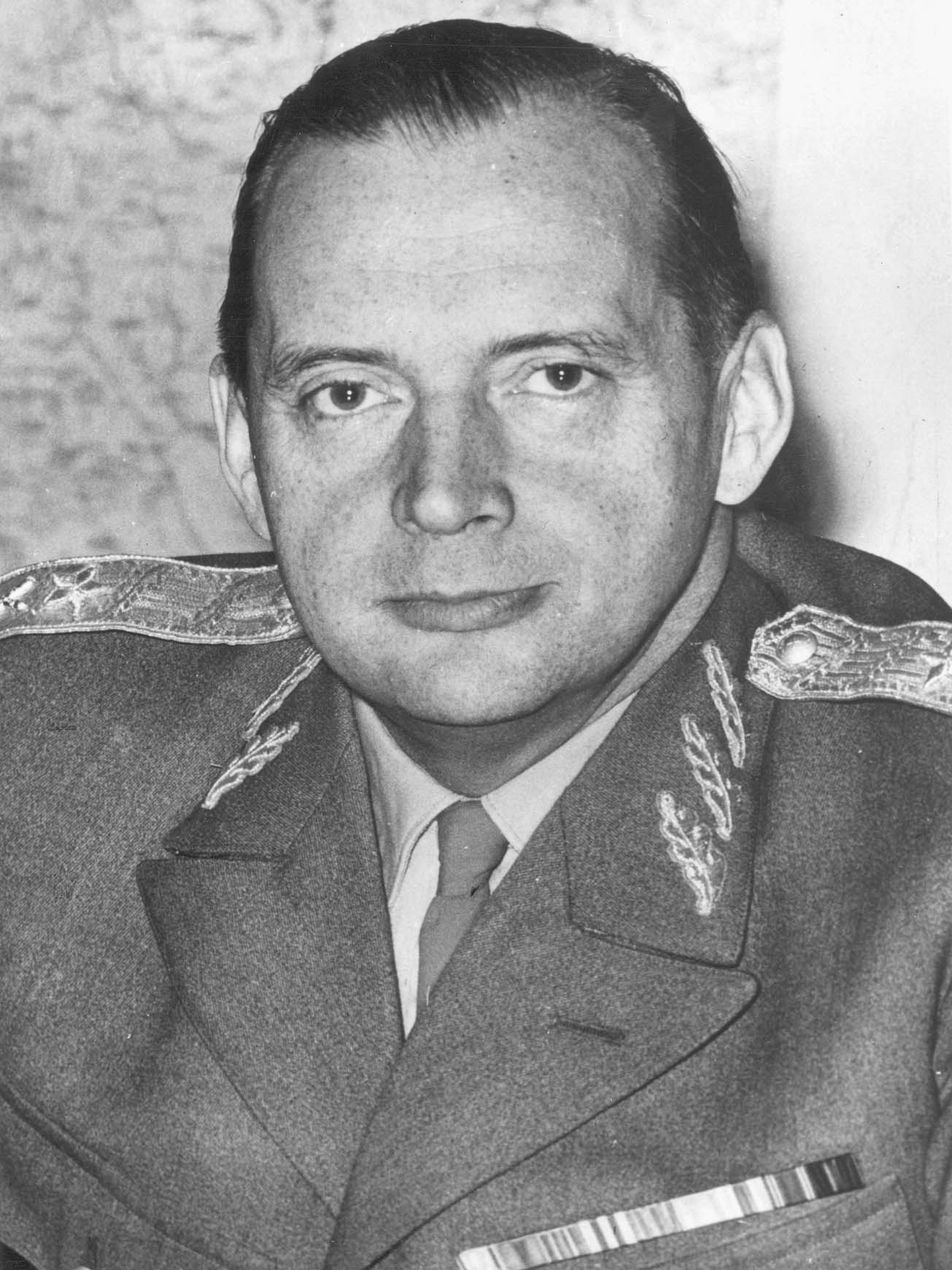
- Almgren as major general
- Born: 4 March 1913; Linköping, Sweden
- Died: 20 May 2001 (aged 88); Täby, Sweden
- Military career
- Allegiance: Sweden
- Branch: Swedish Army
- Service years: 1934–1976
- Rank: General
- Commands: Army Department, Defence Staff; Jämtland Ranger Regiment; Chief of the Defence Staff; Eastern Military District; Commandant General in Stockholm; Chief of the Army
- Awards: Knight of the Order of the Sword; Knight of the Order of Vasa and more

General Carl Eric Åke Almgren (4 March 1913 – 20 May 2001) was a senior Swedish Army officer. Almgren served as Chief of the Defence Staff from 1961 to 1967, military commander of the Eastern Military District (Milo Ö) from 1967 to 1969 and as the Chief of the Army from 1969 to 1976.

== Early life ==
Almgren was born on 4 March 1913 in Linköping, Sweden, the son of captain Carl Almgren and his wife Esther (née Tell). The father, Carl, who derived from a farming family, was a commissioned officer in the Life Grenadier Regiment, where he was among the more prominent representatives of his corps and had several positions both in the regiment and in the city of Linköping. Carl Eric did very well in school and was chairman of the school association. It is said to have been a disappointment for Almgren's teacher that with his striking theoretical endowment did not choose the academic path. Almgren was an avid reader and in 1930 at the age of 17 he read, according to his reading records, 198 books; ie almost four books per week.

Almgren graduated from Linköpings högre allmänna läroverket with exceptionally high grades on 4 June 1931. A week later he stood as an officer cadet outside the barracks of the Life Grenadier Regiment, the year after his father had resigned. At Military Academy Karlberg, he would have been the top student, if he had not been too outspoken. He graduated third best in his class and at the Royal Swedish Army Staff College he graduated with some of the best grades awarded. Almgren was appointed in April 1934 to officership at Jönköpings-Kalmar Regiment. In 1936 he became a lieutenant and went through the Infantry Officer School. The winter of 1938 to 1939, he studied Russian on a scholarship in Tallinn. Apart from Russian, he also spoke English, German and French fluently.

== Career ==
In October 1939, Almgren was appointed assistant military attaché in Tallinn, Riga, and Kaunas. With placement in Tallinn, he became interested in the tense global political activities. The Soviet Union invasion in 1940 ended his ability to act as attaché, so he was told to observe the Soviet tanks when they crossed the Estonian border. During the war years he served, among other things, in the war preparedness organized army corps and division staff's and attended the Royal Swedish Army Staff College from 1941 to 1943. Almgren was promoted to captain in 1942 and was an officer candidate in the General Staff Corps and the captain of the same in 1945. In the next post-war years, he was placed at the Army Inspectorate's Central Department and the Army Staff's Organization Department, while he taught at the Royal Swedish Army Staff College in tactics and staff service and a shorter time at the Swedish Air Force Flying School.

In 1949 he was appointed captain of Västernorrland Regiment (I 21) and he was promoted to major in the General Staff Corps in 1951. Almgren was a teacher at the newly established Swedish National Defence College from 1951 to 1953 and was placed at the Defence Staff and then as head of the Army Staff's Tactics Department. Almgren was promoted lieutenant colonel in the General Staff Corps in 1955. He was head of the Defence Staff's Army Department, a central post with influence over operational planning and cooperation between the central staff's. He returned to the troop service as training officer in Hälsinge Regiment (I 14) in 1957 and was appointed to colonel and commander of Jämtland Ranger Regiment (I 5) in 1960.

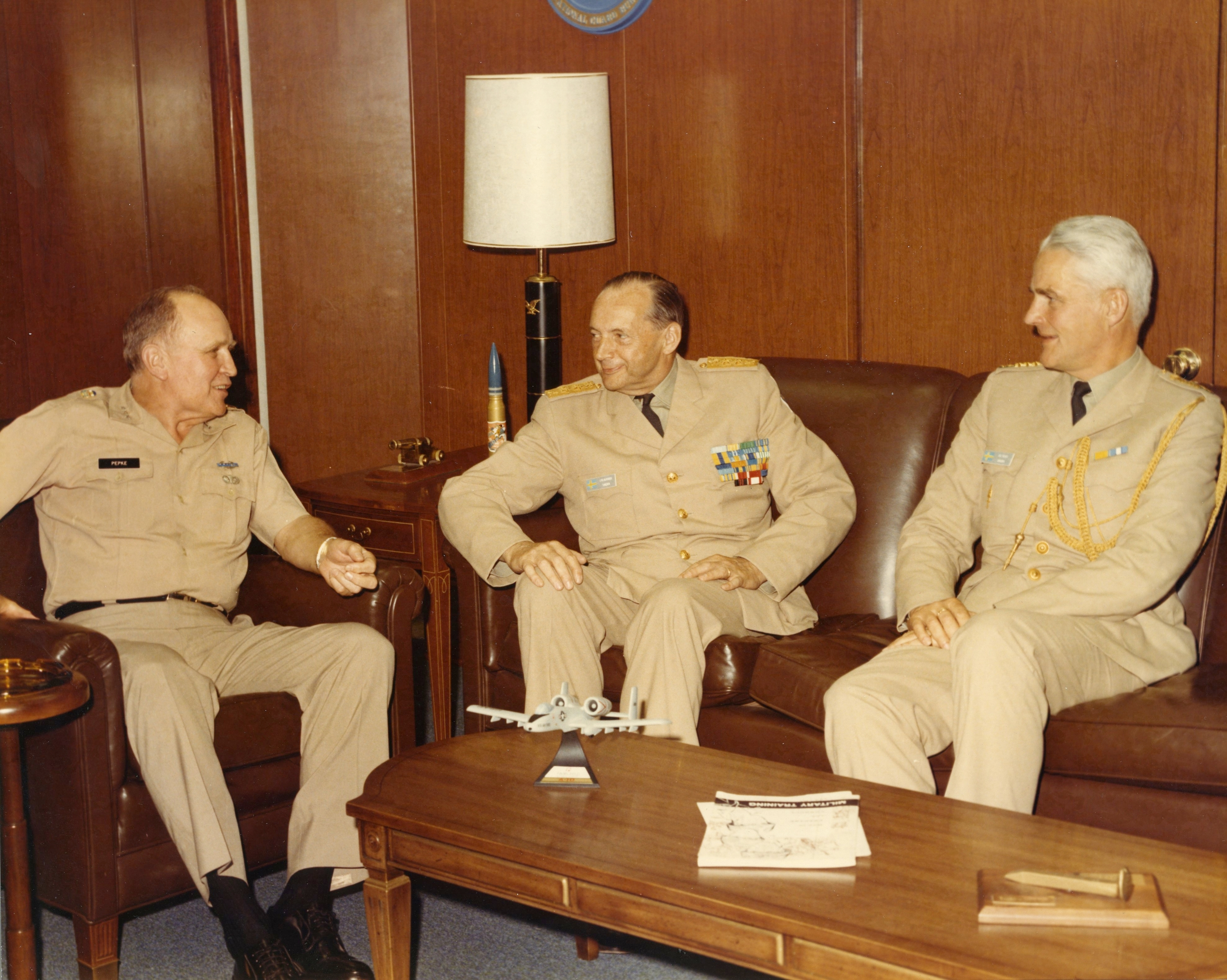
Almgren (center) and Colonel Sten Geijer visits Lieutenant General Donn R. Pepke, FORSCOM Deputy Commander at Fort McPherson, Atlanta, Georgia, in 1975.

Already the following year in 1961 he took up the post as Chief of the Defence Staff, while also being promoted to major general. In 1966 he was promoted to lieutenant general, and in 1967 he was appointed military commander of the Eastern Military District (Milo Ö), and also the Commandant General in Stockholm. Almgren took office as Chief of the Army on 1 October 1969 and served until 1976. When he took office the Defence Act of 1968 had just been put into force. Having lost their previous political agreement between the Social Democrats and the centre-right parties, and it was obvious that the Supreme Commander's military and political assessments accorded less importance. The appropriations frame shrank, the fixed mark-up for technological development disappeared, and the carefully calculated price compensation system previously in force was replaced by a less favorable net price index.

Among Almgren's contributions during his six years as Chief of the Army's was to improve leadership, staff treatment and training methods, as his predecessor Curt Göransson had initiated and that despite no small resistance pushed through a merger of regiments and defence area staffs; the provincial regiments thus regained its original role to both coordinate the defence of their own counties and train brigades for national defence. These far-sighted reforms survived, unfortunately, not the so-called restructuring in the 1990s. By the time of his retirement as army chief, he was promoted to general.

== Other work ==
Alongside the traditional career had his services been used in numerous investigations and special assignments. Almgren was secretary of the Army Officers Training Committee from 1943 to 1946, member of the 1948 Air Defence Committee, expert in the committee for voluntary defence in 1949, expert in the ÖB investigations of 1947, 1954, 1957, 1962 and 1965, expert in the 1962 Defence Committee and the 1965 Defence Investigation, member of the board of the Swedish Civil Defence League (Sveriges civilförsvarsförbund) from 1956 to 1957, the Total Defence's head-board (Totalförsvarets chefsnämnd), the Total Defence's information board (Totalförsvarets upplysningsnämnd), the National Singal Security Board (Statens signalskyddsnämnd) and the presidium of the Central Association of Society and Defence.

Almgren was also a military employee of Stockholms-Tidningen in two periods 1943–1946 and 1952–1954. During his time as Chief of the Army 1969–1976 he was at the same time chairman of the Swedish Army Museum. He put a great effort in the Fältjägare Association (Föreningen Fältjägare) in Stockholm and often attended meetings of the Swedish Military History Commission (Svenska militärhistoriska kommissionen) and could occasionally find amusement in the cultural evenings with the Idun Society (Sällskapet Idun). At the military academy Almgren had served as a palace poet.

He became an honorary member of the Royal Swedish Society of Naval Sciences and a member of the Royal Swedish Academy of War Sciences in 1952. Almgren was chairman of the academy's Section I, Land Warfare Studies from 1970 to 1975 and was president of the academy from 1969 to 1971.

== Later life ==
In the obituaries Almgren was termed as extraordinarily talented and extremely hardworking. It also appears that he could be perceived as harsh in his criticism of the persons who in his opinion did not measure up. It also emphasizes that he gladly wrote verse that he performed on various occasions. He also had a strong Christian faith. After his resignation he became involved in The Salvation Army. In 1983 he entered the Salvation Army's counsel and worked actively to plan the activities in crisis situations. In the early 1990s, he followed closely the efforts to build the organization in the Baltic states.

Among his former colleagues the perception of him was diverse. Lieutenant General Carl Björeman said that when Almgren was asked a question and came up with a proposal that he did not like, one felt like a subordinate officer but still not dejected. The opposite was not unusual. Almgren was for many years an active member of Försvarsfrämjandet, an organization that primarily works with advocacy for a strong defence.

== Personal life ==
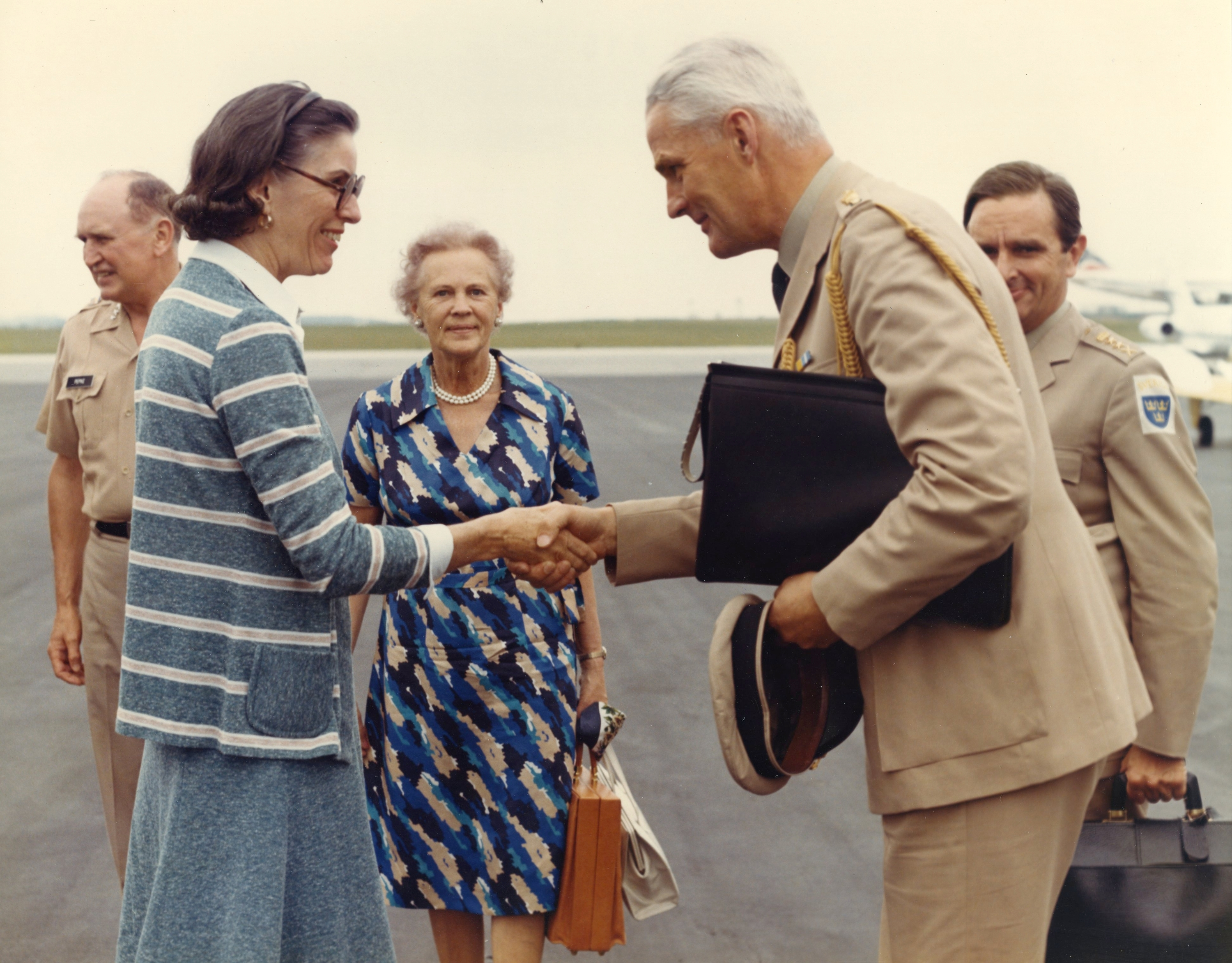
Mrs. Almgren (center) in 1975.

In 1938 he married Lisa Salomonsson (1910–1988), the daughter of Anton Salomonsson and Edla (née Sköld). Almgren was the father of Bo (born 1943) and Åke (born 1946).

== Death ==
Almgren died on 20 May 2001. The funeral took place on 25 June 2001 in Djurholm Chapel in Djursholm. He was interred on 13 July 2001 at Djursholms begravningsplats in Djursholm.

== Dates of rank ==
- 1934 – Second lieutenant
- 1936 – Lieutenant
- 1942 – Captain
- 1951 – Major
- 1955 – Lieutenant colonel
- 1960 – Colonel
- 1961 – Major general
- 1966 – Lieutenant general
- 1976 – General

== Awards and decoration ==
=== Swedish ===
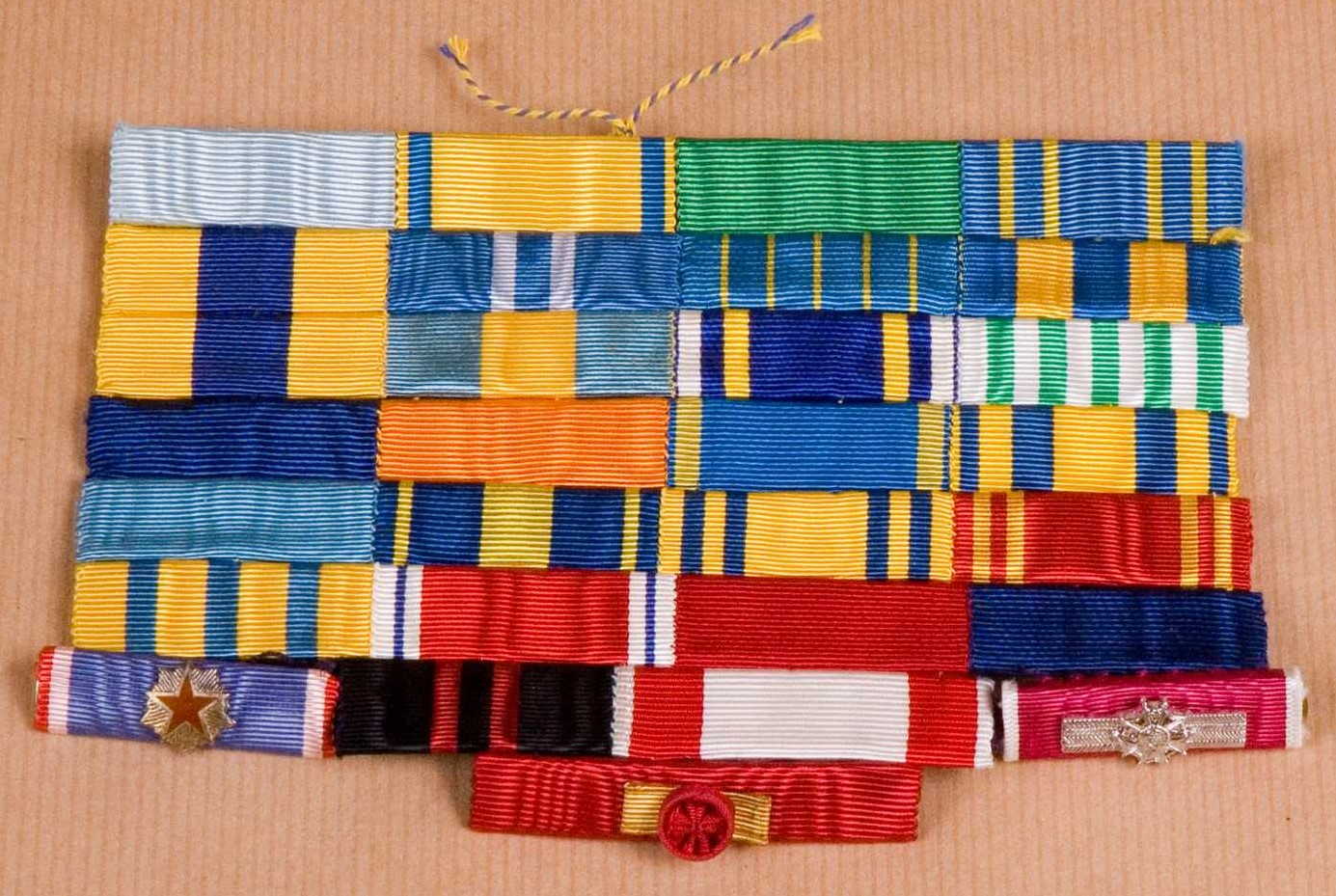
Ribbon bars of Almgren

- (Sweden) Commander Grand Cross of the Order of the Sword (6 June 1968)
- (Sweden) Commander 1st Class of the Order of the Sword (6 June 1964)
- (Sweden) Knight of the Order of Vasa
- (Sweden) Home Guard Medal of Merit in Gold
- (Sweden) Swedish Central Federation for Voluntary Military Training Medal of Merit in silver
- (Sweden) Swedish Civil Protection Association Merit Badge in gold
- (Sweden) SLSM?
- (Sweden) Central Board of the National Swedish Rifle Association's silver medal (Sveriges skytteförbunds överstyrelses silvermedalj)
- (Sweden) Swedish Voluntary Radio Organization's gilded telegraph key (FRO:s förgyllda telegrafinyckel)

=== Foreign ===
- Commander Grand Cross of the Order of the Lion of Finland (December 1974)
- (Denmark) Grand Cross of the Order of the Dannebrog (26 August 1977)
- (Norway) Commander with Star of the Order of St. Olav (1964)
- Grand Decoration of Honour in Gold with Star for Services to the Republic of Austria (1974)
- (Finland) Winter War 1939-40 Commemorative Medal

== Bibliography ==
- André, Beaufre; Almgren, Carl Eric; Almström, Carl-Erik (1966). Modern strategi för fred och krig [Modern strategy for peace and war]. Militärlitteraturföreningen, 99-0119708-2; 241Prisma, 99-0330598-2 (in Swedish). Stockholm: Prisma. SELIBR 30884.
- Almgren, Carl Eric; Lorents, Yngve (1959). Atlantpakten under tio år [North Atlantic Alliance during ten years]. 1950-talets världspolitik, 99-0305721-0 (in Swedish). Stockholm: Utrikespolit. inst. SELIBR 666991.
- Almgren, Carl Eric (1956). De moderne våben og deres indflydelse på strategien [The modern weapons and their impact on strategy]. Udenrigspolitiske skrifter, 0109-1654; 2:2 (in Danish). København: Det udenrigspolitiske selskab & Det danske forlag. SELIBR 792851.

Military offices
Preceded by Curt Göransson	Defence Staff's Army Department; 1953–1957	Succeeded by Sigmund Ahnfelt
Preceded by Nils Erik Bouveng	Jämtland Ranger Regiment; 1960–1961	Succeeded by Karl Johan F:son Sergel
Preceded by Curt Göransson	Chief of the Defence Staff; 1961–1967	Succeeded by Stig Synnergren
Preceded by Gustav Åkerman	Eastern Military District; 1967–1969	Succeeded by Ove Ljung
Preceded by Gustav Åkerman	Commandant General in Stockholm; 1967–1969	Succeeded by Ove Ljung
Preceded by Curt Göransson	Chief of the Army; 1969–1976	Succeeded by Nils Sköld
Professional and academic associations
Preceded by Åke Lindemalm	President of the Royal Swedish Academy of War Sciences; 1969–1971	Succeeded by Stig Norén
