= Curt Göransson =

Swedish Army officer (1909–1996)

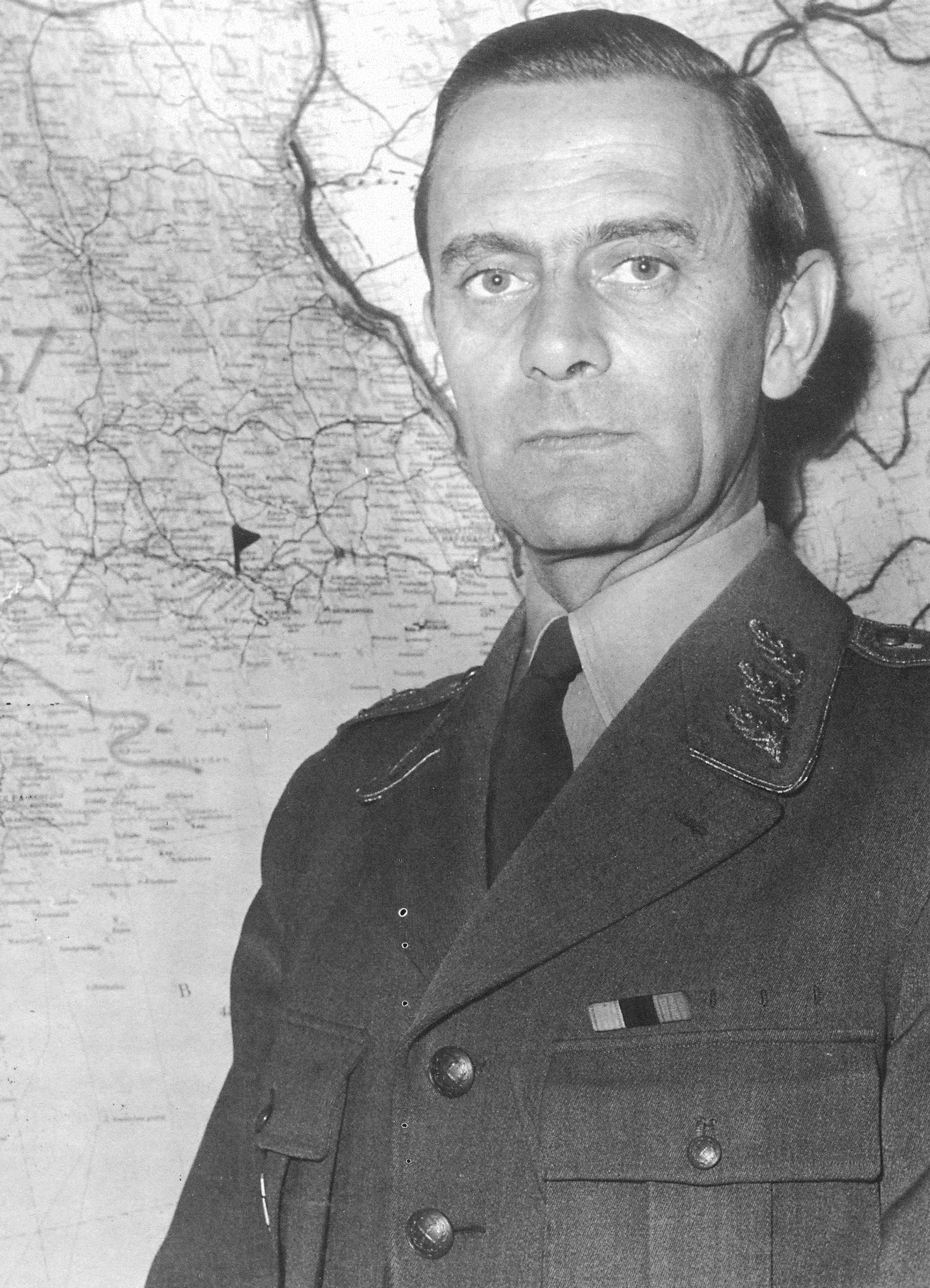
- Born: Curt Ture Engelbrecht Göransson; 15 July 1909; Stockholm, Sweden
- Died: 11 November 1996 (aged 87); Danderyd, Sweden
- Burial place: Lidingö Cemetery; 59°21′56″N 18°9′40″E
- Military career
- Allegiance: Sweden
- Branch: Swedish Army
- Service years: 1930–1969
- Rank: General
- Commands: Army Department, Defence Staff; Hälsinge Regiment; Chief of the Defence Staff; I Military District; Chief of the Army
- Awards: Order of the Sword; Order of Vasa; Order of the Polar Star etc

General Curt Ture Engelbrecht Göransson (15 July 1909 – 11 November 1996) was a Swedish Army officer. Göransson's senior commands include Chief of the Defence Staff 1957–1961, military commander of the I Military District 1961–1963 and Chief of the Army 1963–1969.

== Early life ==
Göransson was born on 15 July 1909 in Hedvig Eleonora Parish, Stockholm, Sweden, the son of lieutenant colonel Erik Göransson and his wife Elsa (née Engelbrecht).

== Career ==
Göransson was commissioned as an officer in the Uppland Infantry Regiment (I 8) with the rank of second lieutenant in 1930. He studied first at the Royal Swedish Army Staff College from 1935 to 1937, and later at the Prussian Military Academy in Berlin from 1938 to 1939. Göransson was promoted to captain in the General Staff Corps in 1940 and was a teacher at the Royal Swedish Army Staff College from 1942 to 1945. He served in the Svea Life Guards (I 1) from 1945 to 1947 and was appointed major of the General Staff in 1948. Göransson served as a military expert at the Scandinavian defense negotiations from 1948 to 1949 and in defense investigation from 1949 to 1950.

He was promoted to lieutenant colonel in the General Staff Corps in 1952 and served in the South Scanian Infantry Regiment (I 7) in 1953. Göransson was promoted to colonel and regimental commander of Hälsinge Regiment (I 14) in 1955. He remained in that position until 1957, when he was promoted to major general and appointed Acting Chief of the Defence Staff. Göransson was then Chief of the Defence Staff from 1957 to 1960. Göransson served then as a military expert in the 1960 Defence Committee. He then served as military commander of the I Military District from 1961 to 1963. He was promoted to lieutenant general in 1963 and served as Chief of the Army from 1963 to 1969, when he was promoted to full general.

== Personal life ==
In 1933, Göransson married Eva Nordlinder (1909–1991), the daughter of banker Ferdinand Nordlinder and Annie Hedberg. He was the father of Kjell (born 1934) and Christer (1938–1995).

== Death ==
Göransson died on 11 November 1996 in Danderyd, Stockholm County, Sweden. He is interred at Lidingö Cemetery.

== Dates of rank ==
- 1930 – Second lieutenant
- 19?? – Lieutenant
- 1940 – Captain
- 1948 – Major
- 1952 – Lieutenant colonel
- 1955 – Colonel
- 1957 – Major general
- 1963 – Lieutenant general
- 1969 – General

== Awards and decorations ==
=== Swedish ===
- (Sweden) Commander Grand Cross of the Order of the Sword (6 June 1965)
- (Sweden) Knight of the Order of the Polar Star
- (Sweden) Knight of the Order of Vasa
- (Sweden) Home Guard Medal of Merit in Gold
- (Sweden) Swedish Central Federation for Voluntary Military Training Medal of Merit in gold
- (Sweden) Swedish Central Federation for Voluntary Military Training Medal of Merit in silver
- (Sweden) National Federation of Voluntary Motor Cycle Corps Medal of Merit in gold (Frivilliga Motorcykelkårernas Riksförbunds förtjänstmedalj i guld, FMCKGM)
- (Sweden) Swedish Women's Voluntary Defence Organization Royal Medal of Merit in gold
- (Sweden) Voluntary Automobile Club's gold medal (Frivilliga automobilklubbens guldmedalj)
- (Sweden) Gävleborg Rifle Association's gold medal (Gävleborgs skytteförbunds guldmedalj)
- (Sweden) Central Board of the National Swedish Rifle Association's silver medal (Sveriges skytteförbunds överstyrelses silvermedalj)
- (Sweden) Swedish Reserve Officers' Association's badge of honor (Svenska reservofficersföreningens hederstecken)

=== Foreign ===
- (Norway) Grand Cross of the Order of St. Olav (1 July 1968)
- (Norway) Commander with Star of the Order of St. Olav (1 July 1961)
- (Finland) Order of the Cross of Liberty, 4th Class with swords
- (Nazi Germany) 3rd Class of the Order of the German Eagle

== Honours ==
- Member of the Royal Swedish Academy of War Sciences (1949)

Military offices
| Preceded by Malcolm Murray | Defence Staff's Army Department; 1948–1953 | Succeeded by Carl Eric Almgren |
| Preceded by Hans Berggren | Hälsinge Regiment; 1955–1957 | Succeeded by Axel Henriksson |
| Preceded by Richard Åkerman | Chief of the Defence Staff; 1957–1961 | Succeeded by Carl Eric Almgren |
| Preceded by Viking Tamm | I Military District; 1961–1963 | Succeeded by Tage Olihn |
| Preceded by Thord Bonde | Chief of the Army; 1963–1969 | Succeeded by Carl Eric Almgren |
