= Harald Hægermark =

Swedish Army officer (1894–1965)

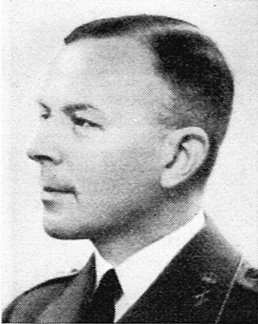
- Born: Harald Oskar Hægermark; 13 November 1894; Torsång, Sweden
- Died: 20 March 1965 (aged 70); Strängnäs, Sweden
- Military career
- Allegiance: Sweden
- Branch: Swedish Army
- Service years: 1914–1960
- Rank: Lieutenant General
- Commands: Royal Signal Regiment; DCOM, V Military District; II Military District

Lieutenant General Harald Oskar Hægermark (13 November 1894 – 20 March 1965) was a senior Swedish Army officer. He served as Commanding General of the II Military District from 1951 to 1960.

== Early life ==
Hægermark was born on 13 November 1894 in Torsång Parish, Kopparberg County, Sweden, the son of Richard Hægermark, a vicar, and his wife Ida Levin. He passed studentexamen in 1912.

== Career ==
Hægermark was commissioned as an officer with the rank of underlöjtnant in 1914 and was assigned to Västmanland Regiment the same year. He was promoted to lieutenant in 1918. Hægermark took an instructor course at the Royal Central Gymnastics Institute from 1919 to 1920 and attended the Royal Swedish Army Staff College from 1920 to 1924 and served as aspirant in the General Staff from 1924 to 1926 when he was promoted to captain in the same staff. He served as an office head in the General Staff from 1926 to 1933 and in Södermanland Regiment in 1933. Hægermark was promoted to major and served as a teacher in staff service at the Royal Swedish Army Staff College in 1935. Hægermark was from 1935 to 1937 secretary of the committee for the preparation of field regulations.

He was promoted to lieutenant colonel in 1938 and served in the North Scanian Infantry Regiment in 1939 and became colonel in the General Staff Corps in 1941. From 1941 to 1942, Hægermark served as head of the Expedition Department in the Army Staff. He was then appointed commander of the Royal Signal Regiment in 1942. He then served as Deputy Commander of the V Military District from 1945 to 1951 when he was promoted to major general. Hægermark then served as Commanding General of the II Military District from 1951 to 1960 when he retired and was promoted to lieutenant general on the retired list.

== Personal life ==
In 1922, Hægermark married Aina Tour (1898–1992), the daughter of Carl Tour and Julia Janson.

== Death ==
Hægermark died on 20 March 1965 in Strängnäs City Parish (Strängnäs stadsförsamling) in Södermanland County, Sweden. Hægermark was interred on 29 March 1965 at the Eastern Cemetery in Västerås.

== Dates of rank ==
- 1914 – Underlöjtnant
- 1918 – Lieutenant
- 1926 – Captain
- 1935 – Major
- 1938 – Lieutenant colonel
- 1941 – Colonel
- 1951 – Major general
- 1960 – Lieutenant general

== Awards and decorations ==
- (Sweden) Commander Grand Cross of the Order of the Sword (6 June 1958)
- (Sweden) Commander 1st Class of the Order of the Sword (6 June 1947)
- (Sweden) Commander 2nd Class of the Order of the Sword (6 June 1945)
- (Sweden) Knight 1st Class of the Order of the Sword (1934)
- (Sweden) Knight of the Order of Vasa (1934)
- (Sweden) Landstormen's Silver Medal (LandstSM)

=== Foreign ===
- Knight 1st Class of the Order of the White Rose of Finland

== Honours ==
- Member of the Royal Swedish Academy of War Sciences (1939)

Military offices
Preceded by Gottfried Hain	Royal Signal Regiment; 1942–1945	Succeeded by Nils Åke Sundberg
Preceded by Anders Bergquist	Deputy Commander, V Military District; 1945–1951	Succeeded by None
Preceded by Henry Tottie	Commanding General, II Military District; 1951–1960	Succeeded by Malcolm Murray
