= Per Rudberg =

Swedish vice admiral and commander of the navy

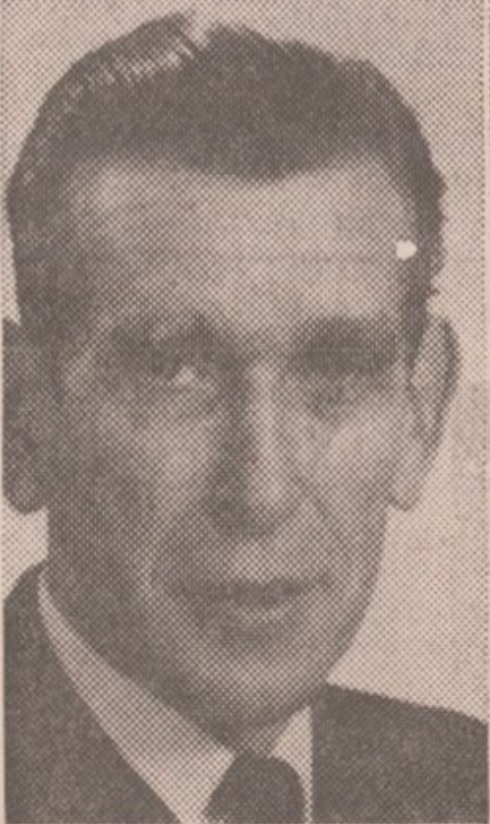
- Rudberg as captain (c. 1972).
- Born: Per Yngve Rudberg; 29 August 1922; Vänersborg, Sweden
- Died: 9 May 2010 (aged 87); Värmdö, Sweden
- Military career
- Allegiance: Sweden
- Branch: Swedish Navy
- Service years: 1944–1984
- Rank: Vice Admiral
- Commands: HSwMS Magne; HSwMS Östergötland; 1st Destroyer Flotilla; Operations Command 2, Defence Staff; Lower Norrland Military District; Chief of the Navy
- Conflicts: Soviet submarine U 137

Vice Admiral Per Yngve Rudberg (29 August 1922 – 9 May 2010) was a Swedish Navy officer. Rudberg was commissioned as an officer in the Swedish Navy after graduating from Royal Swedish Naval Academy in 1944. He served aboard destroyers, torpedo boats and training vessels and later became commanding officer of the First Destroyer Flotilla and led among other things the naval development in the emerging radar technology. Besides the usual management training, Rudberg attended the French Naval Academy. He served in the Defence Staff and the Naval Staff and was promoted to rear admiral and military commander of the Lower Norrland Military District (Milo NN) in 1973. Rudberg was promoted to vice admiral and served as the Chief of the Navy from 1978 to 1984 during which time the Swedish submarine incidents culminated when the Soviet submarine U 137 ran aground in Blekinge archipelago.

== Early life ==
Rudberg was born on 29 August 1922 in Vänersborg, Sweden, the son of bishop Yngve Rudberg and his wife Margit (née Hemberg). He was the brother of the philologist Stig Rudberg and the author Birgitta Rudberg. Rudberg's uncle was Gunnar Rudberg and cousin was Sten Rudberg. He passed studentexamen in Uppsala in 1941 and like many others during the World War II, Rudberg made his way to the military.

== Career ==
He underwent naval officer training and became an acting sub-lieutenant (fänrik) in the Swedish Navy in 1944 and held several naval appointments from 1944 to 1950. During these years, Rudberg was assigned to artillery weapons service and it resulted in service on torpedo boats, destroyers and cruisers and the training ship Prins Carl, where he for some years led the navy's radar and fire-control system school. He also served on land at the Royal Swedish Naval Academy in Näsbypark. Rudberg was promoted to sub-lieutenant (löjtnant) in 1946 and completed the Royal Swedish Naval Staff College staff course from 1952 to 1953. He was promoted to lieutenant in 1954 and served in the Naval Staff from 1955 to 1959.

Another important appointment was as aide-de-camp to the then Chief of the Navy, Admiral Stig H:son Ericson. In this context, he participated in the design of a new idea plan for the navy's further development after the navy's unfavorable 1958 Defense Decision. He went on to study at the École Supérieure de Guerre Navale in Paris from 1959 to 1960 and at the Cours Supérieur Interarmées in Paris in 1960. Rudberg was promoted to lieutenant commander in 1960 and served at the Naval Command East in 1963 and in the Defence Staff in 1964. He was promoted to commander in 1964 and was a military expert in the 1965 Defense Investigation, and was head of department in the Defence Staff from 1965 to 1967 when he was promoted to captain. Rudberg was commanding officer of the First Destroyer Flotilla from 1967 to 1970 and promoted to senior captain the same year. He was a skilled captain and flotilla commanding officer who developed the naval tactics concerning electronic warfare and tactics against foreign anti-ship missiles.

Rudberg was section chief in the Defence Staff from 1970 to 1973 and was promoted to rear admiral the same year. He was military commander of the Lower Norrland Military District (Milo NN) from 1973 to 1978. As military commander, he added a naval dimension to the military district which in the past had been so army accentuated. Rudberg was promoted to vice admiral in 1978 and was appointed Chief of the Navy the same year. At this time, the security policy environment had deteriorated in Sweden's region through the Poland crisis and the increase in tension between the superpowers. The Swedish Navy had for a number of years strongly committed to acquire a Swedish anti-ship missile. The government was not prepared to support such a development. The navy was then forced to focus on the acquisition of a foreign option. When Rudberg took office, this process had come a long way. After the Swedish government crisis in 1979 a new government was formed that wanted to change the plans. The risk of repeated delays were evident. Rudberg managed, however, personally to force comprehensive safeguards regarding timing and quality for a production in Sweden. The industry kept its commitments and the Swedish defense got the RBS-15 for sea, air and coastal artillery forces. Likewise, he showed a great commitment to improve the protection against the ongoing violations of foreign submarines in Swedish waters. Demobilized vessels was now placed in depots and could thus be kept in a high material readiness. Trained and demobilized conscripts could if necessary be called in for these vessels.

Rudberg was convinced that the navy should be accorded greater importance in the Swedish defense, and he argued for this in the military management. Meanwhile, Sweden was subjected to repeated underwater violations and Rudberg was forced to redirect the emergency preparedness system to meet the threats. The navy went from being a school navy to become a contingency navy and the coastal artillery began with a constant surveillance of sensitive areas. New equipment was also procured for the submarine protection. Rudberg could collectively leave a qualitatively strengthened navy when he retired in 1984. As the Chief of the Navy, Rudberg would in the event of a military attack on Sweden or in a military crisis immediately be flown to England where he would act as a kind of "reserve Supreme Commander" but also be a link between Sweden and the Allied forces. The Chief of the Army would be the Supreme Commander's deputy and Chief of the Air Force would be the commanding officer at the front. In a news article in Svenska Dagbladet in 1998, Rudberg explained that after Prime Minister Olof Palme's assassination in Stockholm on 28 February 1986, Rudberg, who until recently had been the Chief of the Navy, had called the Supreme Commander Lennart Ljung and announced that he was ready to travel to Washington, D.C., where Sweden's naval chief had his place in the event of a war.

== Retirement ==
After his retirement from active service Rudberg settled in Värmdö and devoted much time to the church congregation activities as churchwarden and elected representative. He was for a period chairman of the parish council. In the church congregation, he got involved in particular issues relating to leadership. Rudberg was chairman of the board of British Aerospace (Sweden) AB from 1985, of Vasa Rediviva from 1986 and board member of the Medborgarrättsrörelsen from 1984 and of the Maritime Museum from 1990.

== Personal life ==
In 1945 he married Kjerstin Oredsson (born 1920), the daughter of doctor Ola Oredsson and Katherine Spira. He was the father of Jan, Sven, Lars and Frank.

== Death ==
Rudberg died on 9 May 2010 in Värmdö, Sweden. The funeral service took place on 18 June 2010 in Värmdö Church.

== Dates of rank ==
- 1944 – Acting sub-lieutenant
- 1946 – Sub-lieutenant
- 1954 – Lieutenant
- 1960 – Lieutenant commander
- 1964 – Commander
- 1967 – Captain
- 1970 – Senior captain
- 1973 – Rear admiral
- 1978 – Vice admiral

== Awards and decorations ==
=== Swedish ===
- (Sweden) Commander 1st Class of the Order of the Sword (1 December 1973)
- (Sweden) Commander Order of the Sword (16 November 1970)
- (Sweden) Knight of the Order of the Sword (1970)

=== Foreign ===
- (Norway) Commander with Star of the Order of St. Olav (1 July 1975)

== Honours ==
- Member of the Royal Swedish Society of Naval Sciences (1961; honorary member in 1973)
- Member of the Royal Swedish Academy of War Sciences (1967)
- Member of the Académie de Marine, Paris (1973)

== Bibliography ==
- Lindberg, Anders; Rudberg, Per; Berggren, G. Rune, eds. (1988). Ebbe Carlsson-affären: ett svenskt Watergate? : en intervjubok [The Ebbe Carlsson affair: a Swedish Watergate? : A book of interviews] (in Swedish). [Stockholm]: [A. Lindberg]. ISBN 91-7970-384-4. SELIBR 7678206.
- Göte, Blom; Rudberg, Per (1996). Vår beredskap - var den god?: marin beredskap tiden 1938-1990 [Our preparedness - was it good ?: naval preparedness during the period 1938-1990]. Marinlitteraturföreningen, 0348-2405; 80 (in Swedish). Stockholm: Kungl. Örlogsmannasällsk. ISBN 91-630-4499-4. SELIBR 7451372.

Military offices
Preceded by Torgil Wulff	Defence Staff's Operations Command 2; 1970–1973	Succeeded by Evert Båge
Preceded by Tage Olihn	Lower Norrland Military District; 1973–1978	Succeeded by Gustaf Peyron
Preceded by Bengt Lundvall	Chief of the Navy; 1978–1984	Succeeded by Bengt Schuback
