= Malcolm Murray (Swedish Army officer) =

Swedish Army officer

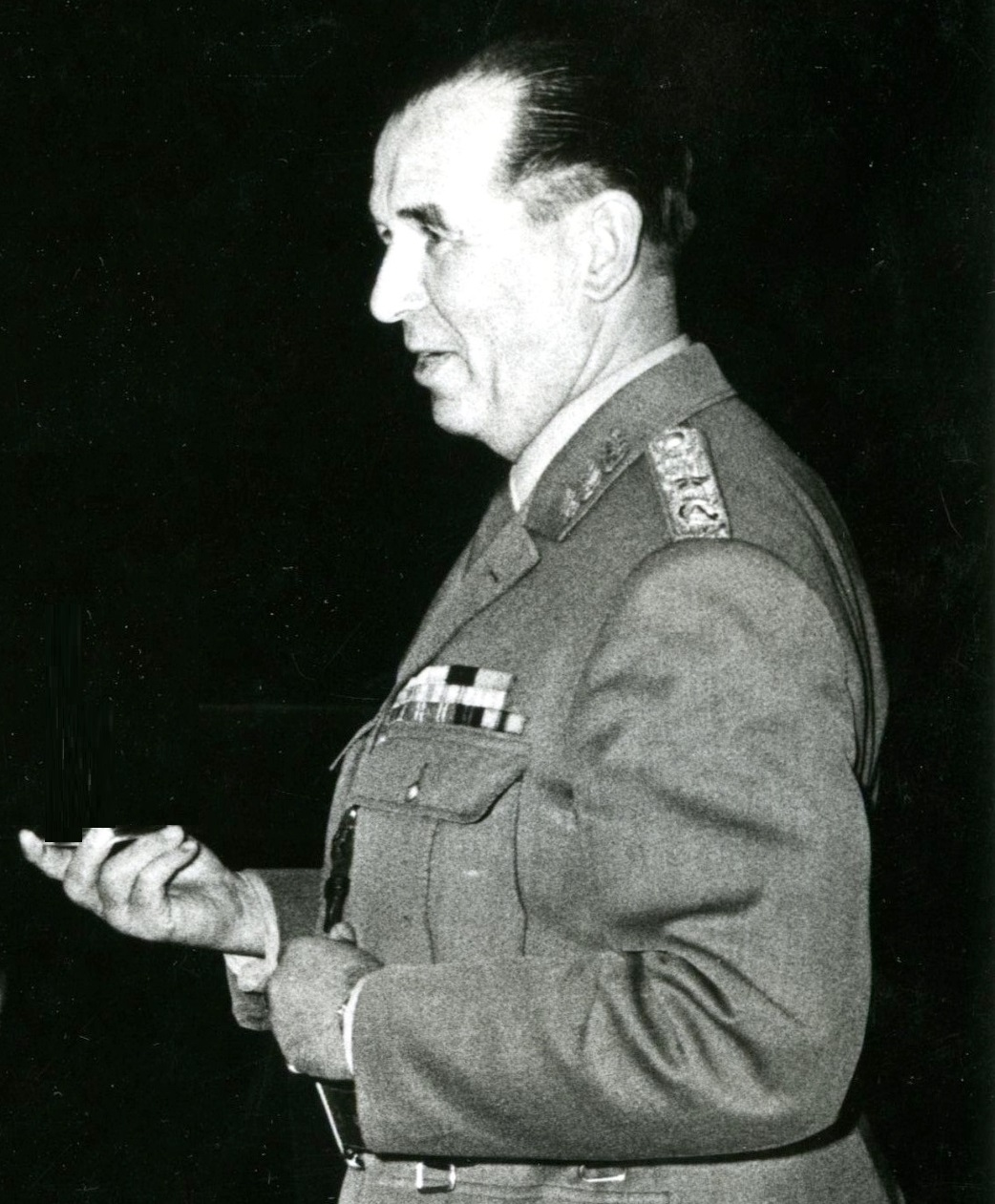
- Major General Murray in 1962.
- Born: Charles Gustaf Uno Malcolm Murray; 7 September 1904; Stockholm, Sweden
- Died: 21 April 1995 (aged 90); Stockholm, Sweden
- Burial place: Norra begravningsplatsen
- Military career
- Allegiance: Sweden
- Branch: Swedish Army
- Service years: 1925–1968
- Rank: Lieutenant General
- Commands: 2nd Ranger Company; Army Department, Defence Staff; Royal Military Academy; Svea Life Guards; Swedish Armoured Troops; II Military District; Swedish National Defence College
- Conflicts: Winter War; Continuation War; Battle of Hanko
- Other work: Chief of His Majesty's Military Staff

Lieutenant General Charles Gustaf Uno Malcolm Murray (7 September 1904 – 21 April 1995) was a Swedish Army officer. Commissioned as an officer in 1925, Murray served in Finnish Army as part of the Swedish Volunteer Corps during the Winter War and as company commander in the Swedish Volunteer Battalion during the Continuation War. Back in Sweden, Murray served as regimental commander of Svea Life Guards, as Inspector of the Swedish Armoured Troops and as military commander of the II Military District. After retiring from the military, Murray served as head of the Crown Prince's Royal Household and as Chief of His Majesty's Military Staff

== Early life ==
Murray was born on 7 September 1904 in Stockholm, Sweden, the son of Ståthållare Adolf Murray and his wife Ebba (née de Champs). He passed studentexamen in 1923.

== Career ==
Murray was commissioned as an officer with the rank of second lieutenant in 1925 and assigned to Svea Life Guards (I 1). Murray became captain of the General Staff Corps in 1938 and served as aide-de-camp to the Prince Gustaf Adolf, Duke of Västerbotten from 1938 to 1947. Murray served as assistant teacher at the Royal Swedish Army Staff College from 1938 to 1939. Murray joined the Finnish Army during the Winter War where he served as captain from 1939 to 1940 and as major in 1941. Murray served in Finland as commanding officer of the operation section in the staff of the Swedish Volunteer Corps and in the battlegroup staff from 1939 to 1940 and as commander of the 2nd Ranger Company, Swedish Volunteer Battalion during the Continuation War in 1941.

Back in Sweden, Murray was promoted to major in 1942 and served as first teacher at the Royal Military Academy from 1942 to 1944. He was then teacher at the Royal Swedish Air Force Staff College from 1942 to 1944, commanding officer of the Army Department of the Defence Staff from 1944 to 1948, before being promoted to lieutenant colonel in 1947. Murray served in the Swedish Armoured Troops in 1948 and was commanding officer of the Royal Military Academy from 1949 to 1953. Promoted to colonel in 1951, Murray served as executive officer of Svea Life Guards from 1953 to 1957 and Inspector of the Swedish Armoured Troops from 1957 to 1960. Murray was promoted to major general in 1960 and appointed military commander of the II Military District. He was then commanding officer of the Swedish National Defence College from 1966 to 1968, head of the Crown Prince's Royal Household from 1968 to 1973, Chief of His Majesty's Military Staff from 1973 to 1978, and First Aide-de-Camp to the King from 1973.

Murray, who in the 1930s belonged to the elite class in orienteering, was prominent in most military sports and won in the Stockholm Garrison's field competitions in 1934 and 1938. He was chairman of the Swedish Orienteering Federation from 1938 to 1961 and corps chief of Stockholm Scout Corps from 1935 to 1939 as well of Jämtland-Härjedalen Scout District in 1961. Furthermore, Murray was chairman of the Swedish Central Association for Sports Promotion (Sveriges centralförening för idrottens främjande) from 1962 to 1974 and the Sweden-Finland Society (Samfundet Sverige-Finland) from 1967 to 1975.

== Death ==
Murray died on 21 April 1995 in Stockholm and was buried on 22 September 1995 at Norra begravningsplatsen in Stockholm.

== Dates of rank ==
- 1925 – Second lieutenant
- 19?? – Lieutenant
- 1938 – Captain
- 1942 – Major
- 1948 – Lieutenant colonel
- 1951 – Colonel
- 1960 – Major general
- 1968 – Lieutenant general

== Awards and decorations ==
=== Swedish ===
- (Sweden) H. M. The King's Medal, 12th size gold (silver-gilt) medal worn around the neck on the Royal Order of the Seraphim ribbon (1978)
- (Sweden) King Gustaf V's Jubilee Commemorative Medal (21 May 1948)
- (Sweden) King Gustaf V's Jubilee Commemorative Medal (25 May 1928)
- (Sweden) Commander Grand Cross of the Order of the Sword (6 June 1967)
- (Sweden) Commander 1st Class of the Order of the Sword (11 November 1957)
- (Sweden) Knight of the Order of the Sword (1943)
- (Sweden) Knight of the Order of the Polar Star (1948)
- (Sweden) Knight of the Order of Vasa (1941)
- (Sweden) St. Erik's Medal (S:t Eriksmedaljen) (18 May 1973)

=== Foreign ===
- Commander Grand Cross of the Order of the Lion of Finland (May 1972)
- (Norway) Commander with Star of the Order of St. Olav (1 July 1964)
- (Finland) Order of the Cross of Liberty, 3rd Class with swords
- (Finland) Order of the Cross of Liberty, 4th Class with swords and oak leaf
- Knight First Class of the Order of the White Rose of Finland
- (Belgium) Knight of the Order of the Crown
- (Saxe-Meiningen) Knight of the Saxe-Ernestine House Order
- (Norway) King Haakon VII Freedom Cross
- (Denmark) King Christian X's Liberty Medal
- (Finland) Finnish War Memorial Medal

== Honours ==
- Member of the Royal Swedish Academy of War Sciences (1949)

== Bibliography ==
- Murray, Malcolm (1950). Atlantpakten under uppbyggnad (in Swedish). Stockholm: Utrikespolitiska institutet. SELIBR 8213568.
- Murray, Malcolm; Löfgren, Stig (1949). För Nordens frihet: synpunkter på ett tidsenligt försvar (in Swedish). Stockholm. SELIBR 247129.
- Murray, Malcolm; Löfgren, Stig (1949). För Nordens frihet: Synpunkter på ett tidsenligt försvar. Skrifter / Militärlitteraturföreningens förlag, 99-0578882-4; 197 (in Swedish). Stockholm: Fören. [Norstedt]. SELIBR 1419927.
- Hardfors, Börje; Thörn, Folke; Nordenfelt, Bertil; Murray, Malcolm (1940). ABC i orientering (in Swedish) (11.-14. tus. ed.). Stockholm: Bonnier. SELIBR 1371224.

Military offices
Preceded by Nils Swedlund	Defence Staff's Army Department; 1944–1948	Succeeded by Curt Göransson
Preceded by Carl Fredrik Reinhold Lemmel	Royal Military Academy; 1949–1953	Succeeded by Bengt Carl Olof Hjelm
Preceded by Thord Bonde	Svea Life Guards; 1953–1957	Succeeded by Sten Langéen
Preceded by Gustav Åkerman	Inspector of the Swedish Armoured Troops; 1957–1960	Succeeded by Tage Olihn
Preceded by Harald Hægermark	II Military District; 1960–1966	Succeeded by Tage Olihn
Preceded by Oscar Krokstedt	Swedish National Defence College; 1966–1968	Succeeded by Claës Skoglund
Court offices
Preceded by Gustav Åkerman	Chief of His Majesty's Military Staff; 1973–1978	Succeeded by Stig Synnergren
