= Lower Norrland Military District =

- Nedre Norrlands militärområde
- Active: 1942–1993
- Country: Sweden
- Allegiance: Swedish Armed Forces
- Branch: Multi (Sea, Air and Land)
- Type: Military district
- Role: Operational, territorial and tactical operations
- Garrison/HQ: Östersund

Insignia
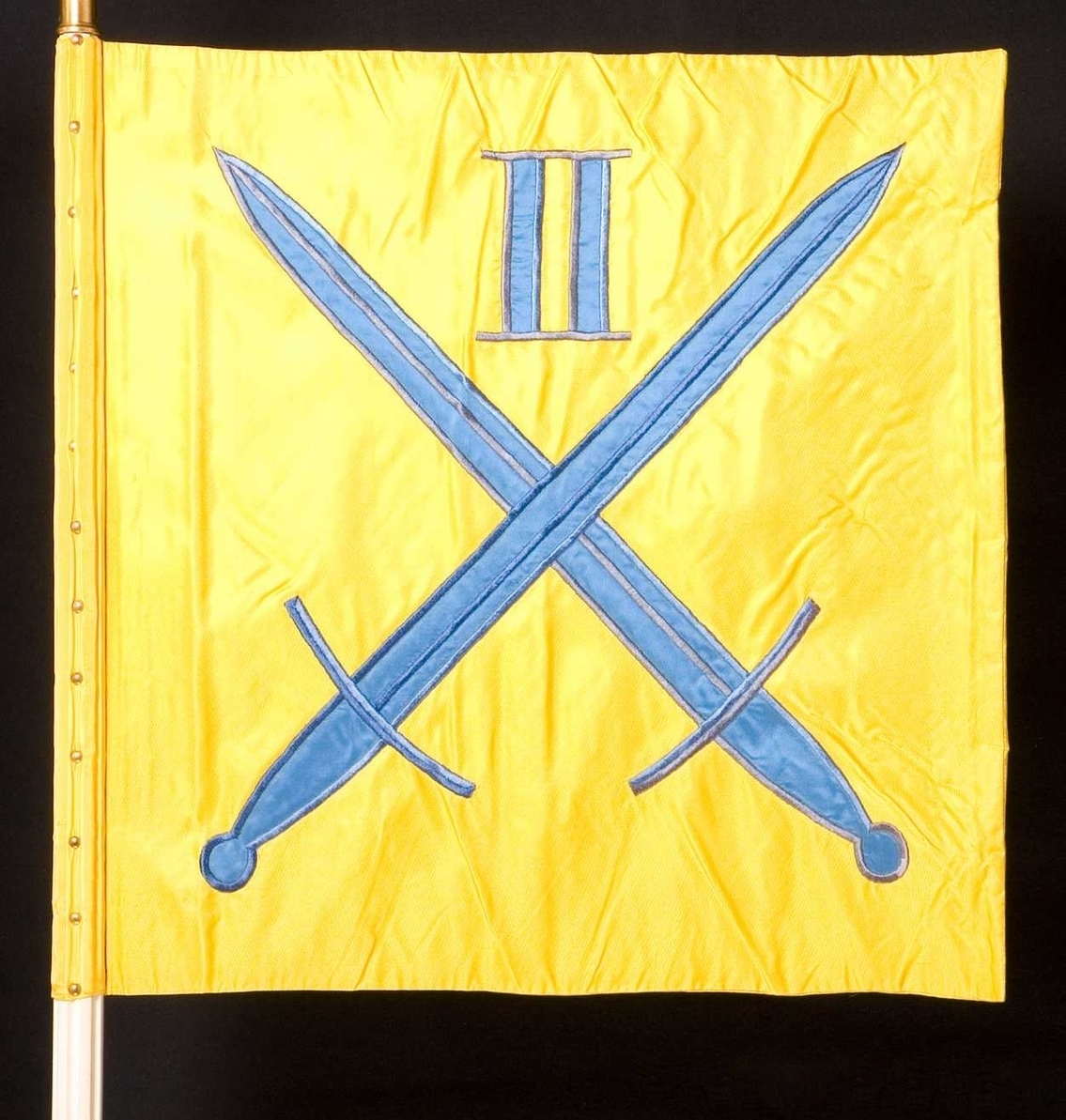
- Command flag

Lower Norrland Military District (Swedish: Nedre Norrlands militärområde, Milo NN), originally II Military District (Swedish: II. militärområdet) was a Swedish military district, a command of the Swedish Armed Forces that had operational control over Lower Norrland, for most time of its existence corresponding to the area covered by the counties of Västernorrland, Jämtland and the northern part of Gävleborg. The headquarters of Milo NN were located in Östersund.

== History ==
Milo NN was created in 1966 along with five other military districts as part of a reorganisation of the administrative divisions of the Swedish Armed Forces. It can be seen as the successor of II Military District (II. militärområdet) created in 1942, but that did not have the same tasks as Milo NN. The military district consisted of the land covered by the above-mentioned counties, and from 1982, also the southern part of Gävleborg County. In 1993, the number of military districts of Sweden was decreased to three, and as a consequence of that, Milo NN was merged with the Upper Norrland Military District (Milo ÖN) to create a new military district, the Northern Military District (Milo N).

== Units 1989 ==
In peacetime the Lower Norrland Military District consisted of the following units, which were training recruits for wartime units:

- Lower Norrland Military District (Milo NN), in Östersund
  - Army units:
    - I 5/Fo 22 - Jämtland Ranger Regiment / Jämtland Defense District, in Östersund
    - I 14/Fo 21 - Hälsinge Regiment / Gävleborg Defense District, in Gävle
    - I 21/Fo 23 - Västernorrland Regiment / Västernorrland Defense District, in Sollefteå
    - A 4 - Norrland Artillery Regiment, in Östersund
    - T 3 - Norrland Logistic Regiment, in Sollefteå
  - Air Force units:
    - F 4/Se NN - Jämtland Wing / Air Defense Sector Lower Norrland, in Östersund
      - 41st Fighter Squadron, with JA 37 Viggen fighter aircraft
      - 42nd Fighter Squadron, with JA 37 Viggen fighter aircraft
    - F 15 - Hälsinge Wing, in Söderhamn under operational command of E 1 - 1st Attack Group of Milo V
      - 151st Attack Squadron, with AJ 37 Viggen attack aircraft
      - 152nd Attack Squadron, with AJ 37 Viggen attack aircraft and SK 37 two-seat trainer aircraft
  - Navy units:
    - MKN - Norrland Coast Naval Command, in Härnösand
      - KA 5 - Härnösand Coastal Artillery Regiment, in Härnösand
        - Fortress Battalion Hemsön covering the Hemsön Naval Base near Härnösand, with three twin 152mm m/51 coastal artillery guns, and two 75mm Tornpjäs m/57 batteries on Hemsön and Härnön islands
        - Fortress Battalion Holmsund covering Umeå, with one 120mm Tornautomatpjäs m/70 battery on Holmögadd and one 75mm Tornpjäs m/57 battery on Bredskär
        - Fortress Battalion Gävle, with a battery of four 152mm m/98 turreted cannons and two batteries of three 75mm m/05-10 coastal canons each
        - Fortress Battalion Sundsvall, with a battery of three 152mm m/98 turreted cannons, two batteries of three 75mm m/05-10 coastal canons each, and one 75mm Tornpjäs m/57 battery in Nyhamn
        - Fortress Battalion Luleå, with a battery of three 152mm m/98 turreted cannons and a battery of three of 57mm m/89 rapid fire guns
        - HSwMS Alnösund (14) minelayer

In wartime the Lower Norrland Military District would have activated the following major land units, as well as a host of smaller units:

- 12th Division, in Östersund
  - IB 14 - Gästrike Brigade, in Gävle, a Type 77 infantry brigade based on the I 14 - Hälsinge Regiment
  - IB 21 - Ådal Brigade, in Sollefteå, a Type 66M infantry brigade based on the I 21 - Västernorrland Regiment
  - NB 35 - Field Jäger Brigade, in Östersund, a Type 85 Norrland Brigade (optimized for arctic/winter warfare) based on the I 5 - Jämtland Ranger Regiment
  - IB 44 - Hälsinge Brigade, in Gävle, a Type 66M infantry brigade based on the I 14 - Hälsinge Regiment
  - NB 51 - Ångermanland Brigade, in Sollefteå, a Type 85 Norrland Brigade based on the I 21 - Västernorrland Regiment

== Heraldry and traditions ==
=== Coat of arms ===
The coat of arms of the Lower Norrland Military District Staff 1983–1993. Blazon: "Azur, an erect sword with the area letter (NN - Lower Norrland) surrounded by an open chaplet of oak leaves, all or."

== Commanding officers ==
=== Military commanders ===
- 1942–1943: Helge Jung
- 1943–1951: Henry Tottie
- 1951–1960: Harald Hægermark
- 1960–1966: Malcolm Murray
- 1966–1973: Tage Olihn
- 1973–1978: Per Rudberg
- 1978–1982: Gustaf Peyron
- 1982–1987: Rolf Wigur
- 1987–1992: Major general Bengt Lönnbom
- 1992–1994: Lieutenant general Lars-Erik Wahlgren (Note: Lieutenant general Lars-Erik Wahlgren had an appointment of two years (1992–1994) but never took up the post. Milo NN was then disbanded in 1993. In 1992, instead, the Chief of Staff, senior colonel Lars-Olof Strandberg became the last military commander.)
- 1992–1993: Senior colonel Lars-Olof Strandberg

=== Chiefs of staff ===
- 1942–1944: Fale Burman
- 1944–1946: Stig af Klercker
- 1946–1949: Anders Hammarsjö
- 1949–1951: Per-Hjalmar Bauer
- 1951–1953: Karl Sergel
- 1953–1959: Lennart Lundmark
- 1959–1962: Atos Gordh
- 1962–1966: Lars-Fritiof Melin
- 1966–1970: Gunnar Eklund
- 1970–1972: Bo Varenius
- 1972–1974: Gustaf Peyron
- 1974–1978: Bengt Hallenberg
- 1978–1979: Jan-Henrik Torselius
- 1979–1981: Lennart Jedeur-Palmgren
- 1981–1983: Harry Winblad
- 1983–1989: Bertil Daggfeldt
- 1989–1992: Lars-Olof Strandberg
- 1993–1993: Vacant

== Names, designations and locations ==
Name	Translation	From		To
II. militärområdet	II Military District	1942-10-01	–	1966-09-30
Nedre Norrlands militärområde	Lower Norrland Military District	1966-10-01	–	1993-06-30
Designation		From		To
II. Milo		1942-10-01	–	1966-09-30
Milo NN		1966-10-01	–	1993-06-30
Location		From		To
Östersund Garrison		1942-10-01	–	1993-06-30

== See also ==
- Military district (Sweden)
