= Gustav Åkerman =

Swedish military officer

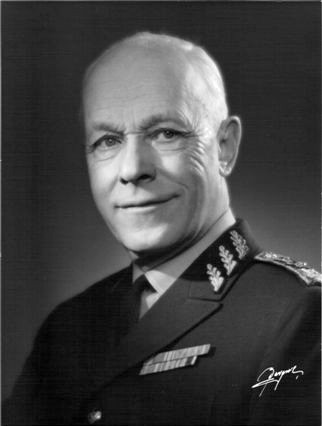
- Born: Karl Gustav Åkerman; 20 October 1901; Stockholm, Sweden
- Died: 24 May 1988 (aged 86)
- Burial place: Norra begravningsplatsen
- Relatives: Richard Åkerman (brother)
- Military career
- Allegiance: Sweden
- Branch: Swedish Army
- Service years: 1923–1973
- Rank: Lieutenant General
- Nickname: Gugge
- Commands: Älvsborg Regiment; Inspector of the Armoured Troops; Chief of the Army Staff; General Staff Corps; IV Military District; Commandant General in Stockholm
- Other work: Chief of His Majesty's Military Staff

Lieutenant General Karl Gustav "Gugge" Åkerman (20 October 1901 – 24 May 1988) was a senior Swedish Army officer. Åkerman had a distinguished military career in Sweden. He began as a second lieutenant in the Göta Life Guards in 1923 and later became a captain in the General Staff in 1936. He served as a teacher at the Royal Swedish Army Staff College, held various positions, and was promoted to major general in 1957. He served as Chief of the Army Staff and the General Staff Corps until 1961. Åkerman later became a lieutenant general and served as the military commander of IV Military District and Commandant General in Stockholm, with further roles including Chief of His Majesty's Military Staff from 1969 to 1973.

== Early life ==
Åkerman was born on 20 October 1901 in Stockholm, Sweden, the son of Lieutenant General Joakim (Jockum) Åkerman and his wife Martina (née Björnstjerna). He was the brother of Oscar (Ocke) Åkerman and Richard (Riri) Åkerman.

== Career ==
Åkerman was commissioned as an officer in the Göta Life Guards (I 2) in 1923 with the rank of second lieutenant. He became captain of the General Staff in 1936. Åkerman served as teacher at the Royal Swedish Army Staff College from 1938 to 1941 and served in the Älvsborg Regiment (I 15) in 1941.

He became major in the General Staff Corps in 1942 and was chief of staff of the V Military District from 1942 to 1944 and was back teaching at the Royal Swedish Army Staff College from 1944 to 1947. Åkerman was promoted to lieutenant colonel in 1945 and served in the Svea Life Guards (I 1) in 1947. He was promoted to colonel in 1950 and was regimental commander of Älvsborg Regiment (I 15) from 1951 to 1956. Åkerman served as Inspector of the Swedish Armoured Troops from 1956 to 1957 and was promoted to major general in 1957 and was appointed Chief of the Army Staff and the General Staff Corps. He stayed in that position until 1961.

Åkerman was military commander of IV Military District from 1961 to 1967 (Eastern Military District (Milo Ö) 1966–67) and served at the same time as the Commandant General in Stockholm. In 1966 he was promoted to lieutenant general. Åkerman served as chief of the His Majesty's Military Staff from 1969 to 1973.

== Other work ==
Åkerman was military contributor in the Social-Demokraten newspaper from 1940 to 1942 and Borås Tidning from 1942 to 1945. He was chairman of the association Friends of the Army Museum (Armémusei vänner) from 1960 to 1976 and Swedish Military Sports Association (Sveriges militära idrottsförbund) from 1958 to 1967.

== Personal life ==
In 1925, he married Clary Magnusson (1904–1973), the daughter of managing director Karl Magnusson and Gerda (née Hasselgren). He was the father of Gerd (born 1927) and Lars (born 1932).

== Death ==
Åkerman died on 24 May 1988 and was buried on 20 October 1988 in Norra begravningsplatsen in Stockholm.

== Dates of rank ==
- 1923 – Second lieutenant
- 19?? – Lieutenant
- 1936 – Captain
- 1942 – Major
- 1945 – Lieutenant colonel
- 1950 – Colonel
- 1957 – Major general
- 1966 – Lieutenant general

== Awards and decorations ==
=== Swedish ===
- (Sweden) Commander Grand Cross of the Order of the Sword (6 June 1964)
- (Sweden) Knight of the Order of the Polar Star
- (Sweden) Knight of the Order of Vasa

=== Foreign ===
- (Italy) 1st Class / Knight Grand Cross of the Order of Merit of the Italian Republic (14 June 1966)
- (Norway) Commander with Star of the Order of St. Olav (1 July 1961)

== Honours ==
- Member of the Royal Swedish Academy of War Sciences (1948)

Military offices
Preceded by Gunnar Fredrik Brinck	Älvsborg Regiment; 1951–1956	Succeeded by Erik Rosengren
Preceded by Birger Pontén	Inspector of the Swedish Armoured Troops; 1956–1957	Succeeded by Malcolm Murray
Preceded by Bert Carpelan	Chief of the Army Staff General Staff Corps; 1957–1961	Succeeded by Arne Mohlin
Preceded by Bert Carpelan	IV Military District Commandant General in Stockholm; 1961–1967	Succeeded by Carl Eric Almgren
Court offices
Preceded by Thord Bonde	Chief of His Majesty's Military Staff; 1969–1973	Succeeded by Malcolm Murray
