= His Majesty's Military Staff =

Swedish military unit

Chief of His Majesty's Military Staff
- Chef för H.M. Konungens stab
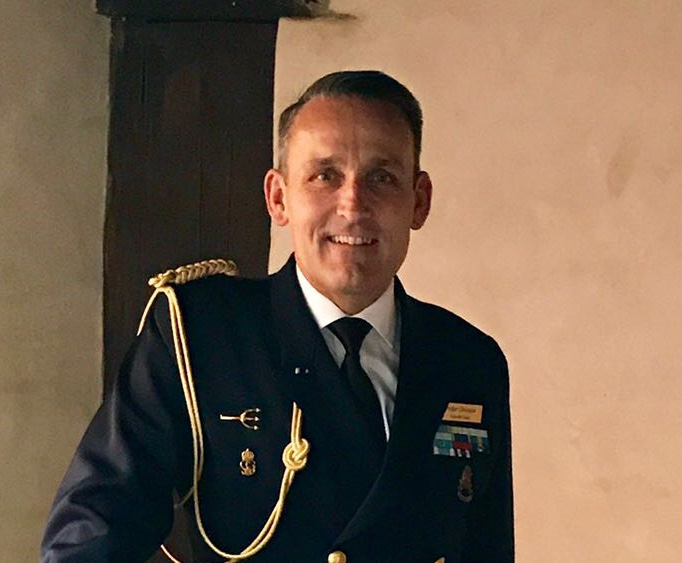
- Incumbent; MajGen Peder Ohlsson, Swedish Amphibious Corps since 1 October 2023
- Style: General/Admiral
- Member of: Royal Court of Sweden
- Reports to: His Majesty The King
- Seat: Stockholm Palace
- Nominator: Swedish Armed Forces
- Appointer: Government of Sweden
- Term length: No fixed term

His Majesty's Military Staff (Note: According to the name tag of Chief of Staff Håkan Pettersson pictured here.) (Swedish: H.M. Konungens stab) is the military staff of the Swedish monarch and functions as a unit of the Royal Court. It is led by the chief of staff and supports the King and the Royal Family at official ceremonies, military exercises and representations. The chief of staff also participates in state visits. The staff belongs to the Swedish Armed Forces and is subordinate to the King directly. The chief of staff shall also assist the King with an on duty aide-de-camp. The King and the Crown Princess have twelve aides-de-camp each and they serve a month a year as on duty aides-de-camp. Their guard list is determined by the chief of staff. Prince Carl Philip has two aides-de-camp. These support the Prince during the year at the times when he has official missions and requests an aide-de-camp. Since 2023, Major General Peder Ohlsson serves as chief of staff.

== Uniform ==
The chief of staff wears a large aiguillette m/1816 and guard stick m/1793. The stick is provided with a twist of black silk with two black tassels. An officer in the staff carries the king's royal cypher of gold-colored metal.

== Chiefs of Staff ==
The head of the staff is called either First Aide-de-Camp and Chief of the King's Staff (Swedish: Förste adjutant och chef för H.M. Konungens stab) or Chief Principal Aide-de-Camp to the King (Swedish: Chef för H.M. Konungens stab).

Under Karl XIV Johan

- 1821–1824: Lieutenant Colonel Mauritz Axel Lewenhaupt
- 1824–1825: General Magnus Brahe
- 1825–1828: General Palle Römer Fleischer
- 1828–1837: General Johan Peter Lefrén
- 1837–1843: General Sixten David Sparre

Under Oscar I

- 1843–1858: ?
- 1858–1859: General Fabian Jakob Wrede

Under Karl XV

- 1859-1867: General Fabian Jakob Wrede
- 1867–1872: General Sven Lagerberg

During the reign of Oscar II

- 1872–1905: General Sven Lagerberg
- 1905–1907: General Hemming Gadd

During the reign of Gustaf V

- 1908–1909: Major General Carl Rosenblad (acting)
- 1909–1910: Lieutenant General Carl Warberg
- 1910–1923: Lieutenant General (Note: Promoted to general in 1913.) Gustaf Uggla
- 1924–1944: Admiral Carl August Ehrensvärd
- 1944–1950: General Olof Thörnell

During the reign of Gustaf VI Adolf

- 1950–1963: Lieutenant General Hugo Cederschiöld
- 1963–1969: General Thord Bonde
- 1969–1973: Lieutenant General Gustav Åkerman

During the reign of Carl XVI Gustaf

- 1973–1978: Lieutenant General Malcolm Murray
- 1978–1986: General Stig Synnergren
- 1986–1990: General Lennart Ljung
- 1990–1997: Admiral Bror Stefenson
- 1997–2003: Lieutenant General Curt Sjöö
- 2003–2007: Vice Admiral Frank Rosenius
- 2007–2018: Major General Håkan Pettersson
- 1 October 2018–2023: Lieutenant General Jan Salestrand
- 1 October 2023–present: Major General Peder Ohlsson

== See also ==
- Commandant General in Stockholm
- Military Cabinet (Prussia)
