= Tage Olihn =

Swedish Army officer

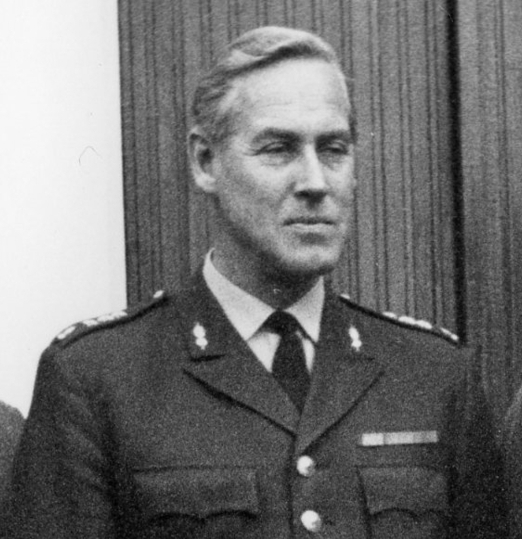
- Olihn in 1963.
- Born: David Tage Olihn; 5 November 1908; Ronneby, Sweden
- Died: 16 April 1996 (aged 87); Söndrum, Sweden
- Military career
- Allegiance: Sweden; Finland (1940); Abyssinia (1946–49, 1956–59)
- Branch: Swedish Army
- Service years: 1930–1973
- Rank: Lieutenant General
- Commands: Halland Regiment; Swedish Armoured Troops; I Military District; Lower Norrland Military District
- Conflicts: Winter War

Lieutenant General David Tage Olihn (5 November 1908 – 16 April 1996) was a senior officer of the Swedish Army. Olihn's senior commands include Inspector of the Swedish Armoured Troops and military commander of the I Military District and of the Lower Norrland Military District (Milo NN). Olihn also served in Finland during the Winter War in 1940 and in Abyssinia two times, from 1946 to 1949, and from 1956 to 1959.

== Early life ==
Olihn was born on 5 November 1908 in Ronneby, Sweden, the son of Nils Olihn, a teacher, and his wife Elna (née Svensson). He was educated at the Artillery and Engineering College in 1930 and was the same year commissioned as an officer in Halland Regiment (I 16) with the rank of second lieutenant.

== Career ==
Olihn attended the Royal Swedish Army Staff College from 1938 to 1940. He then served in the Swedish Volunteer Corps in Finland during the Winter War in 1940. Olihn became captain of the General Staff Corps in 1943. In 1946, a cadet school was established in the Ethiopian Imperial Guard, commanded by Olihn. The army group, "Group Olihn" trained officers in the Imperial Guard until 1948 when it was replaced by "Group Nilsson", commanded by lieutenant colonel Rickard Nilsson. Back in Sweden in 1948, he was promoted to major in the Svea Life Guards (I 1). Olihn became major of the General Staff Corps in 1950 and served as head of the Education Department in the Army Staff from 1950 to 1953. He was promoted to lieutenant colonel in 1952 and attended the Swedish National Defence College in 1953.

Olihn was appointed military attaché in Washington, D.C. and Ottawa in 1954 and was promoted to colonel in 1955. He then served as a military adviser in Abyssinia from 1956 to 1959. There he commanded a group of 12 Swedish General Staff Corps officers who served as military advisors training Ethiopian staff officers. Back in Sweden, he was appointed regimental commander of Halland Regiment in 1959. After a year, Olihn was appointed Inspector of the Swedish Armoured Troops. In 1963, he was promoted to major general and appointed military commander of the I Military District. Three years later, he was appointed to military commander of the Lower Norrland Military District (Milo NN). Olihn served in this position until 1973 when he was promoted to lieutenant general and retired from the military.

Olihn was a member of the Swedish-Ethiopian Association, succeeding Carl Gustaf von Rosen as chairman in 1960. He was also an honorary member of the Friends of the Halland Regiment Association (Hallands regementes kamratförening).

== Personal life ==
In 1940 he married Charlotte Ankarcrona (1918–1999), the daughter of major Sten Ankarcrona and Ellen Kjellberg. They had three children: Nils (born 1941), Ulla (born 1943) and Ann-Charlotte (born 1955).

== Death ==
Olihn died on 16 April 1996 in Söndrum parish in Halland County.

== Dates of rank ==
- 1930 – Second lieutenant
- 19?? – Lieutenant
- 1943 – Captain
- 1948 – Major
- 1952 – Lieutenant colonel
- 1955 – Colonel
- 1963 – Major general
- 1973 – Lieutenant general

== Awards and decorations ==
=== Swedish ===
- (Sweden) Commander Grand Cross of the Order of the Sword (6 June 1970)
- (Sweden) Commander 1st Class of the Order of the Sword (6 June 1962)
- (Sweden) Knight of the Order of Vasa
- (Sweden) Medal for Noble Deeds in gold

=== Foreign ===
- (Ethiopian Empire) Commander of the Order of Menelik II
- (Ethiopian Empire) Commander of the Order of the Star of Ethiopia
- (Denmark) Knight First Class of the Order of the Dannebrog
- (France) Officer of the Order of the Black Star
- (Norway) Knight First Class of the Order of St. Olav
- (United States) Legionnaire of the Legion of Merit (25 May 1956)
- (Finland) Order of the Cross of Liberty, 4th Class with swords

Military offices
Preceded by Arne Mohlin	Halland Regiment; 1959–1960	Succeeded by Nils Juhlin
Preceded by Malcolm Murray	Swedish Armoured Troops; 1960–1963	Succeeded by Per-Hjalmar Bauer
Preceded by Curt Göransson	I Military District; 1963–1966	Succeeded by Stig Norén
Preceded by Malcolm Murray	Lower Norrland Military District; 1966–1973	Succeeded by Per Rudberg
