= Torsång =

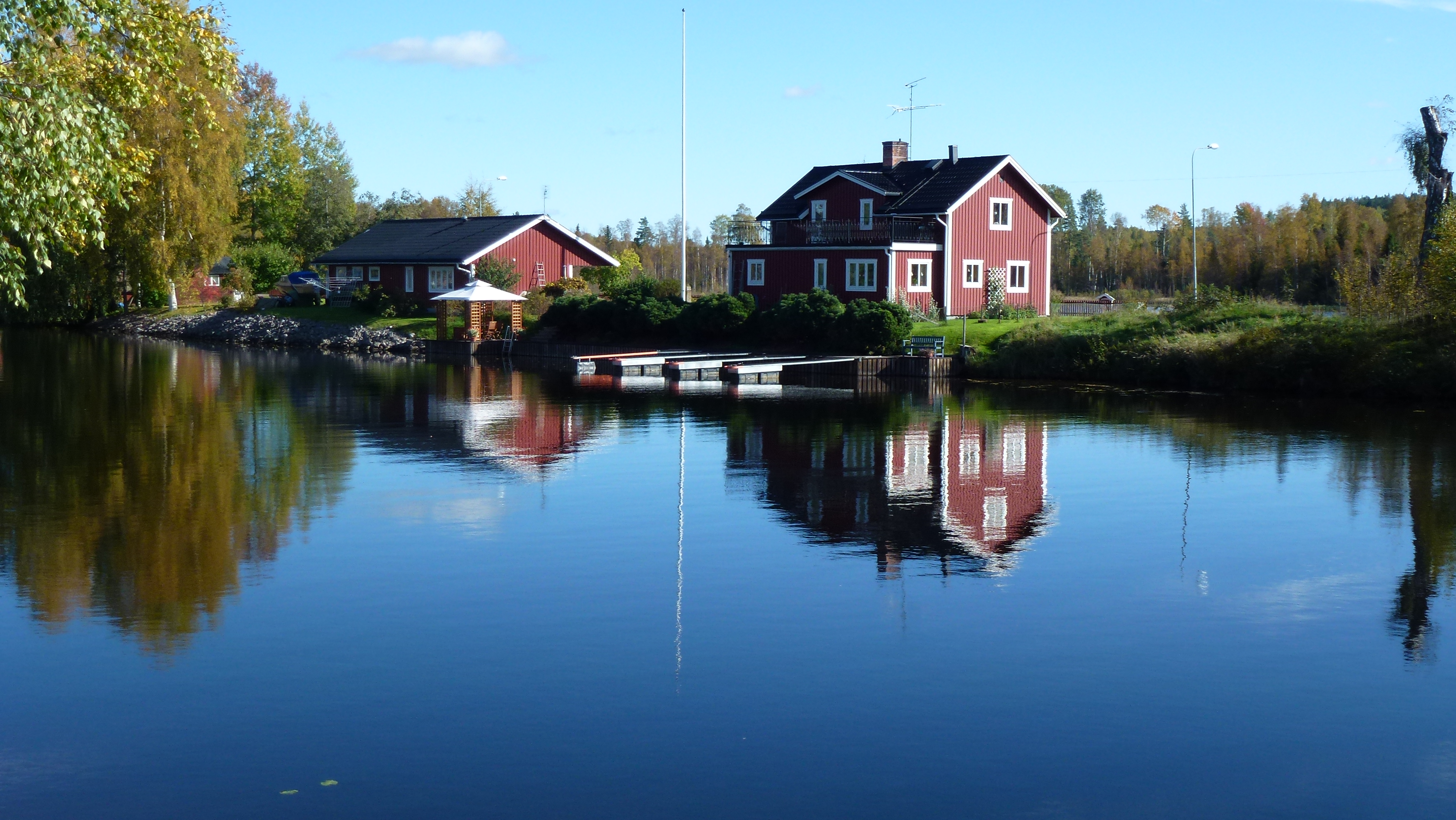

- Location within Dalarna Location within Sweden
- Coordinates: 60°28′N 15°34′E
- Country: Sweden
- Province: Dalarna
- County: Dalarna County
- Municipality: Borlänge Municipality

Area
  - Total: 1.08 km^{2} (0.42 sq mi)

Population (31 December 2010)
  - Total: 666
  - Density: 616/km^{2} (1,600/sq mi)
- Time zone: UTC+1 (CET)
  - Summer (DST): UTC+2 (CEST)

Torsång (Swedish pronunciation: [ˈtɔ̂ʂːɔŋ]) is a locality situated in Borlänge Municipality, Dalarna County, Sweden with 666 inhabitants in 2010. It is situated on lakes Runnsjön and Osjön and the river Dalälven, which are connected with the canal Lillälven.

Torsång Court District, or Torsångs tingslag, was a district of Dalarna in Sweden. The court district (tingslag) served as the basic division of the rural areas in Dalarna, except for one district that was a hundred (härad). The entire province had once been a single hundred, called Dala hundare.

== History ==
Swedish (then future) king Gustav I (Gustav Vasa) passed through in the year 1520, while a fugitive from Danish mercenaries. A memorial stone was erected to mark this important event in Swedish history. It can still be seen in Torsång's open-air museum.

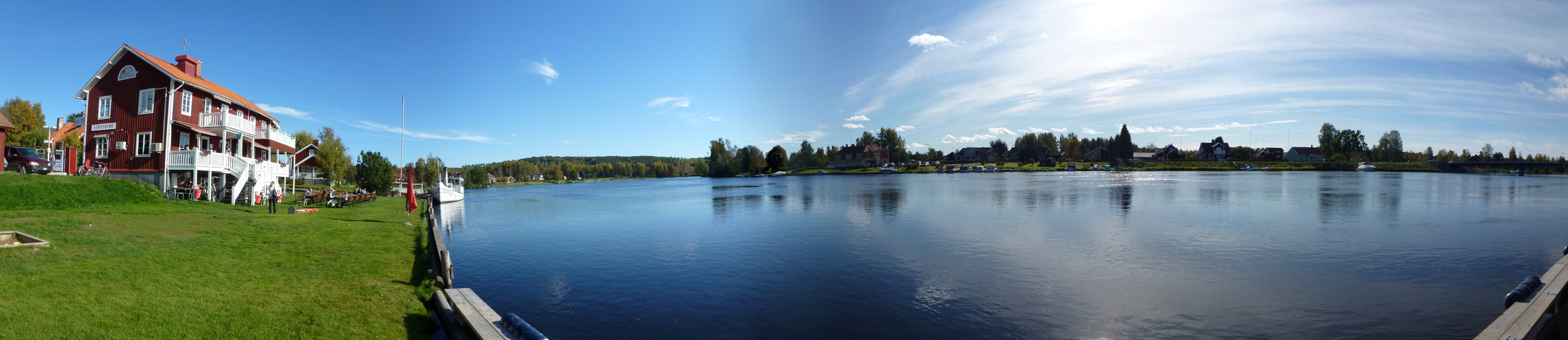
Café Torsång on the banks of river Dalälven
