= Hälsinge Regiment =

Former military unit in Sweden

Coordinates: 60°40′08″N 17°07′11″E

- Hälsinge regemente
- Active: 1630–1709; 1709–1713; 1713–1997
- Country: Sweden
- Allegiance: Swedish Armed Forces
- Branch: Swedish Army
- Type: Infantry
- Size: Regiment
- Part of: 5th Military District (1833–1889); 6th Military District (1889–1893); 6th Army Division (1893–1901); VI Army Division (1902–1927); Northern Army Division (1928–1936); II Army Division (1937–1943); II Military District (1943–1966); Eastern Military District (1966-1982); Lower Norrland Military District (1966-1982); Lower Norrland Military District (1982-1993); Middle Military District (1982-1993)
- Garrison/HQ: Gävle
- Motto(s): "Fasthet, Förmåga, Förtroende" ("Solidity, Ability, Confidence") (Note: The motto was adopted in 1984 by the then regimental commander of I 14, senior colonel Ingmar Arnhall. The motto has later been used by the 18th Home Guard Battalion.)
- Colors: Black and white
- March: "Marcia militaris" (Schmidt) (Note: The march was adopted in 1863 and established in 1953 by Army Order 33/1953. It has been used since 1997 by the Gävleborg Group (Gävleborgsgruppen).)
- Battle honours: Novgorod (1611), Warsaw (1656), Fredriksodde (1657), March Across the Belts (1658), Lund (1676), Landskrona (1677), Narva (1700), Düna (1701), Jakobstadt (1704), Gemauerthof (1705), Malatitze (1708), Gadebusch (1712)

Insignia
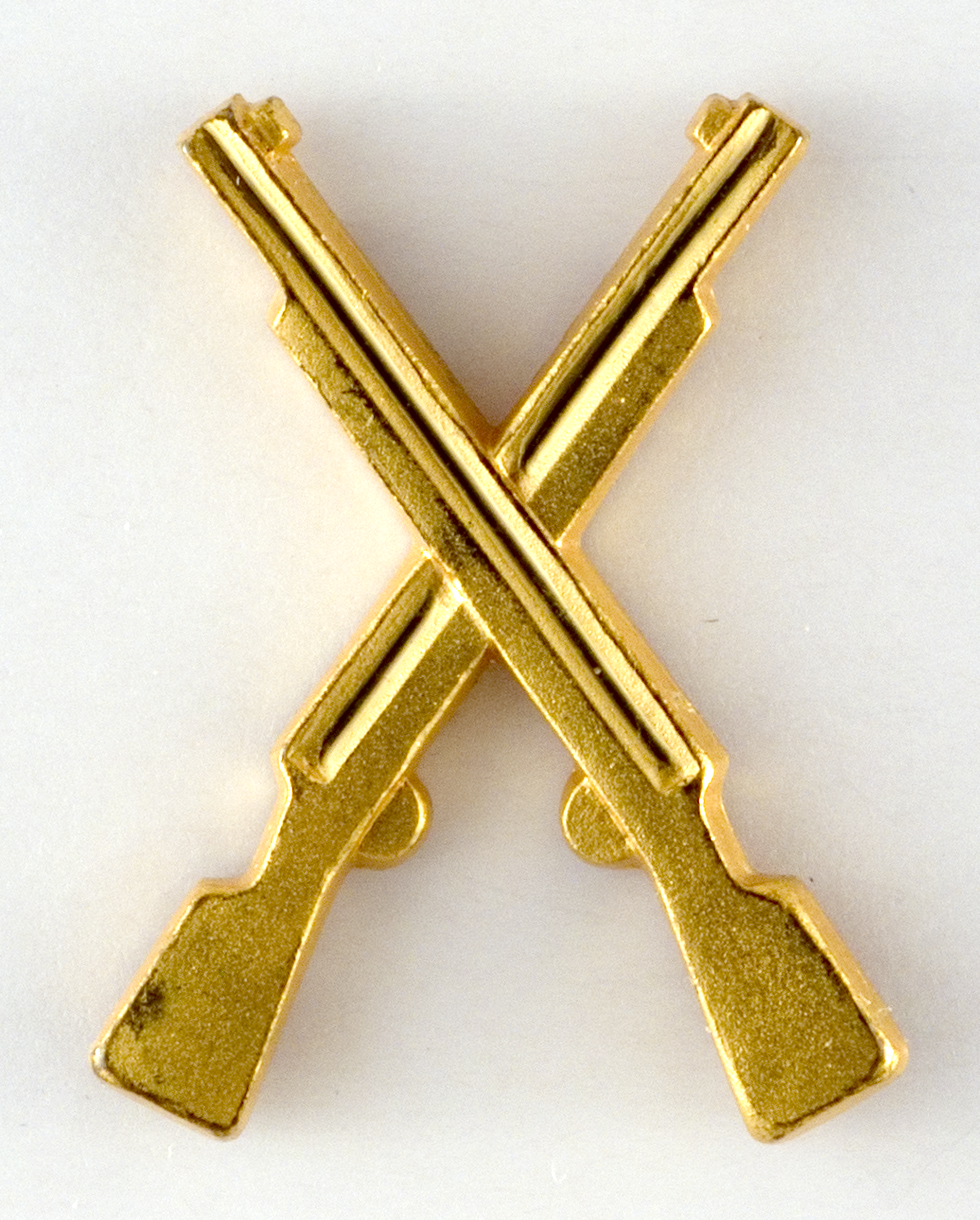
- Branch insignia m/60

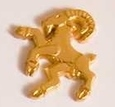
- Unit insignia m/60

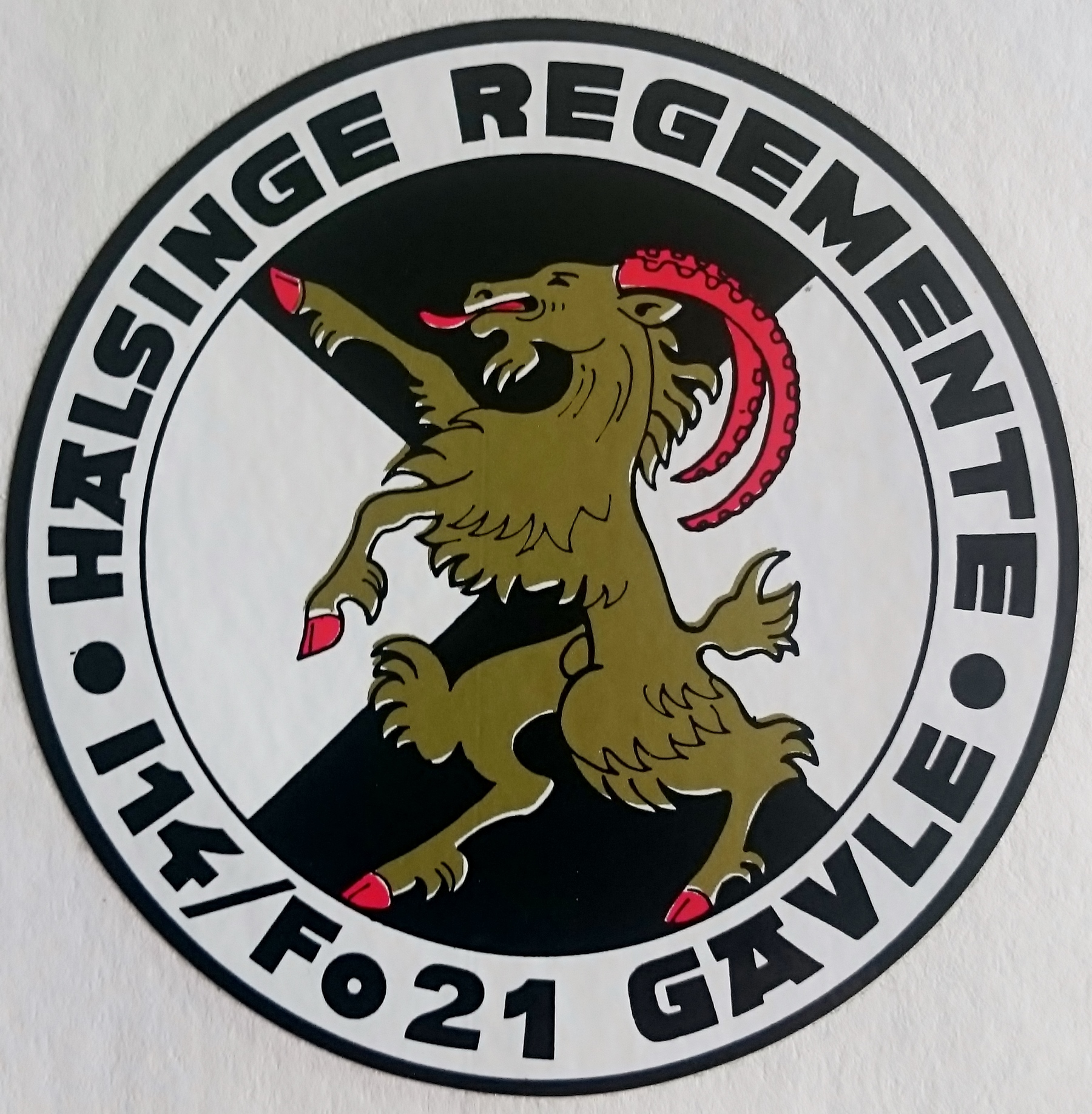
- Shoulder sleeve insignia

The Hälsinge Regiment (Swedish: Hälsinge regemente), designations I 14, I 14/Fo 49 and I 14/Fo 21, was a Swedish Army infantry regiment that traced its origins back to the 16th century. It was disbanded in 1997. The regiment's soldiers were originally recruited from the provinces of Hälsingland and Gästrikland, and it was later garrisoned in Gästrikland.

== History ==
The regiment has its origins in fänikor (companies) raised in Hälsingland and Gästrikland in the 1550s and 1560s. In 1615, these units—along with fänikor from the nearby provinces of Medelpad, Ångermanland and Västerbotten—were organised by Gustav II Adolf into Norrlands storregemente, of which eleven of the total 24 companies were recruited in Hälsingland and Gästrikland. Norrlands storregemente consisted of three field regiments, of which Hälsinge Regiment was one. Sometime around 1624, the grand regiment was permanently split into three smaller regiments, of which Hälsinge Regiment was one.

The regiment was officially raised in 1630 although it had existed since 1624. Hälsinge Regiment was one of the original 20 Swedish infantry regiments mentioned in the Swedish constitution of 1634. The regiment was also called Joakim Brahe's Regiment after its first commander Joakim Brahe. It was allotted in 1682 as the second Swedish regiment to be so, after Dalarna Regiment.

The regiment was given the designation I 14 (14th Infantry Regiment) in a general order in 1816. Hälsinge Regiment was garrisoned in Gävle from 1909. In 1973, the regiment gained the new designation I 14/Fo 49 as a consequence of a merge with the local defence area Fo 49. When the local defence area changed designation to Fo 21 in 1982, the designation changed to I 14/Fo 21. The regiment was disbanded in 1997, and the barracks that had been refurbished in 1995–1996 were turned into a college campus for the University College of Gävle.

== Campaigns ==
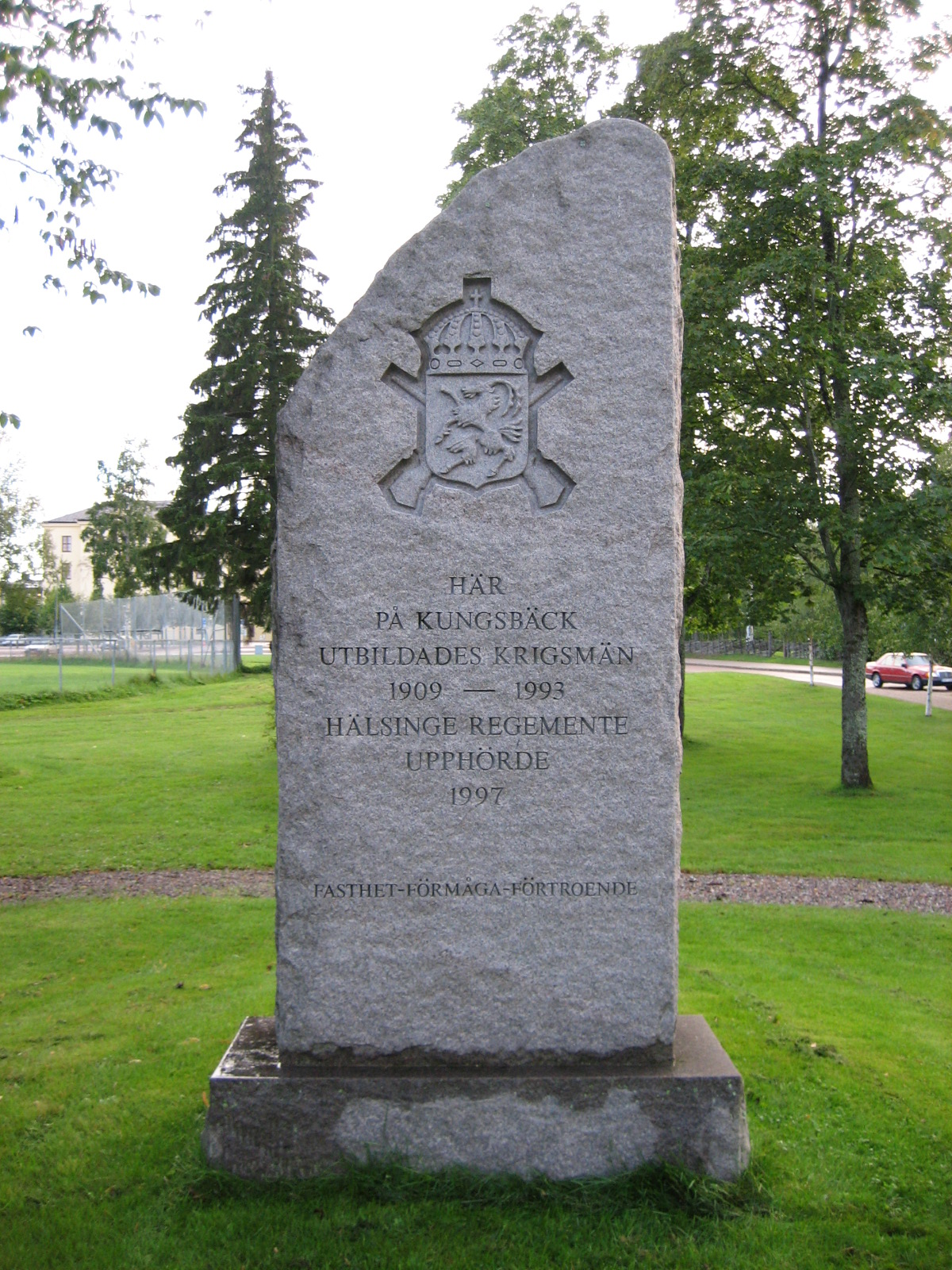
The Hälsinge Regiment memorial monument in Gävle. The inscription reads: "Here at Kungsbäck soldiers of war were trained 1909–1993. Hälsinge Regiment ceased in 1997. Solidity–Ability–Confidence."

- The Swedish War of Liberation (1521–1523) (Note: Participated as the various fänikor that later formed the regiment.)
- The Northern Seven Years' War (1563–1570)
- The War against Russia (1590–1595)
- The Polish War (1600–1629)
- The Thirty Years' War (1630–1648)
- The Torstenson War (1643–1645)
- The Northern Wars (1655–1661)
- The Scanian War (1674–1679)
- The Great Northern War (1700–1721)
- The Hats' Russian War (1741–1743)
- The Seven Years' War (1757–1762)
- The Gustav III's Russian War (1788–1790)
- The Finnish War (1808–1809)
- The Campaign against Norway (1814)

== Organisation ==
1634(?)

- Livkompaniet
- Överstelöjtnantens kompani
- Majorens kompani
- Alfta kompani
- Delsbo kompani
- Ovansjö kompani
- Arbrå kompani
- Jervsö kompani

1814(?)

- Livkompaniet
- Forssa kompani
- Järvsö kompani
- Delsbo kompani
- Färnebo kompani
- Arbrå kompani
- Alfta kompani
- Ovansjö kompani

== Heraldry and traditions ==
=== Colours, standards and guidons ===
The regiment have carried a number of colour over the years. In 1897, King Oscar II presented a new colour to the two battalions of the regiment, which then replaced the 1850 colour. On 29 September 1952, the 1897 colour was replaced when the regiment was presented with a new colour in Gävle by His Majesty the King Gustaf VI Adolf. It was used as regimental colour by I 14/Fo 21 until 1 January 1998. The new colour was similar to the 1850 colour. It was white and black, which is also the regimental colour, and taken from Hälsingland (black) and Gästrikland (white). The colour is drawn by Brita Grep. It has not been possible to discover who has manufactured the colour. It is embroidered by hand in insertion technique. Blazon: "On cloth per saltire black and white the provincial badge of Hälsingland; a rampant yellow buck, armed red. On a yellow border at the upper side of the colour, battle honours (Novgorod 1611, Warszawa 1656, Fredriksodde 1657, Tåget över Bält 1658, Lund 1676, Landskrona 1677, Narva 1700, Düna 1701, Jakobstadt 1704, Gemäuerthof 1705, Malatitze 1708, Gadebusch 1712) in black".

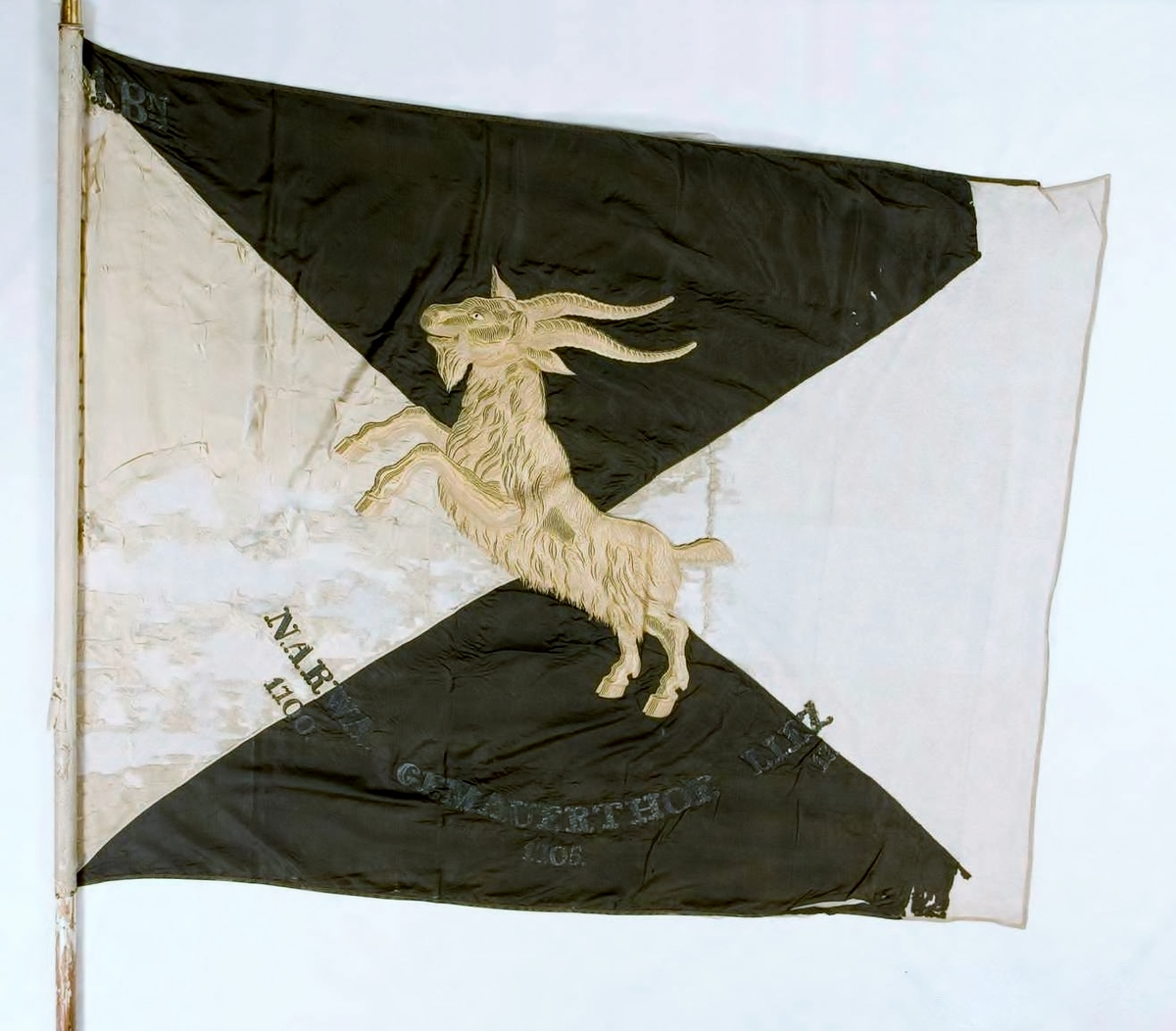
1850 colour of the 1st Battalion, Hälsinge Regiment.

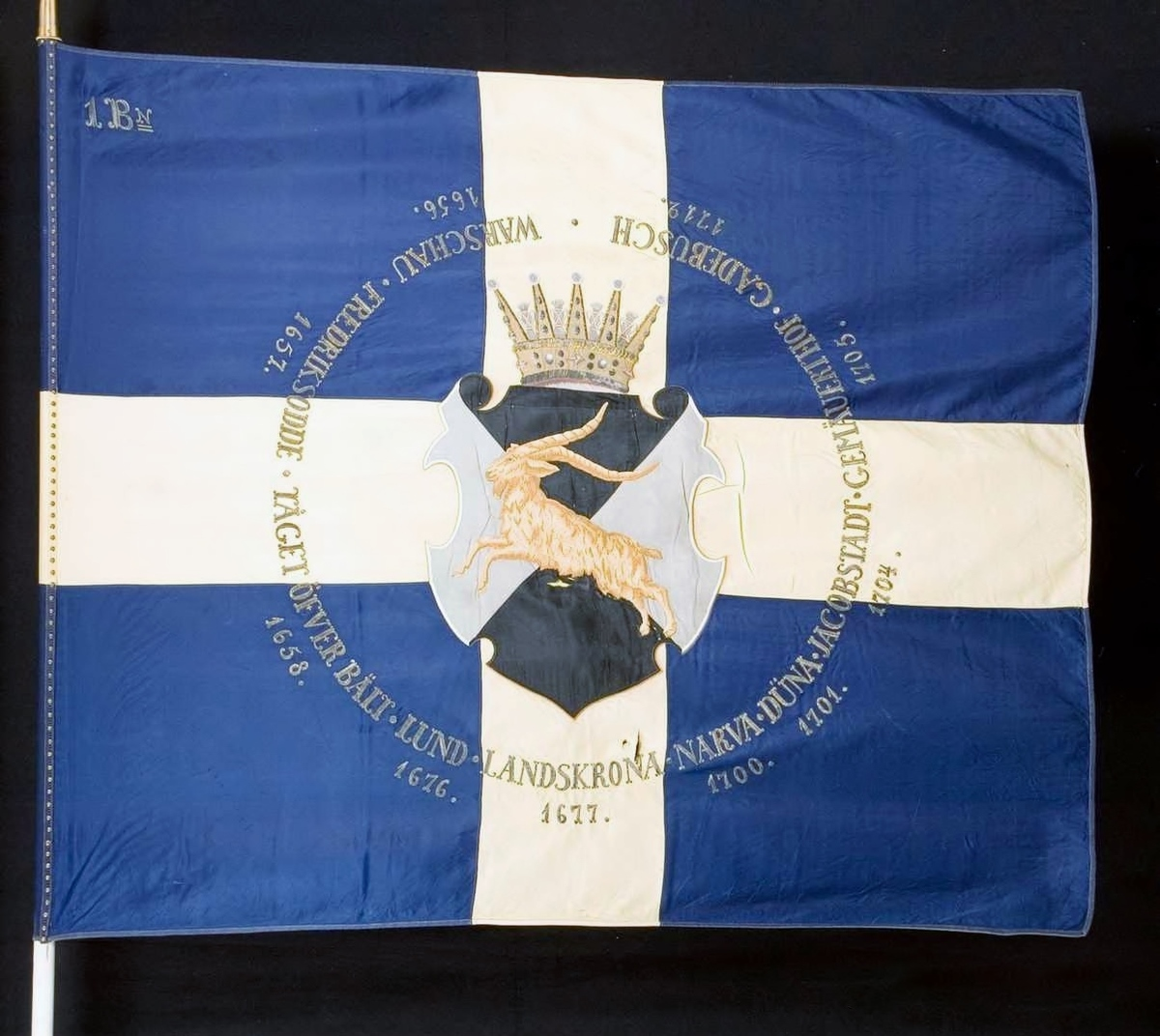
1897 colour of the 1st Battalion, Hälsinge Regiment.

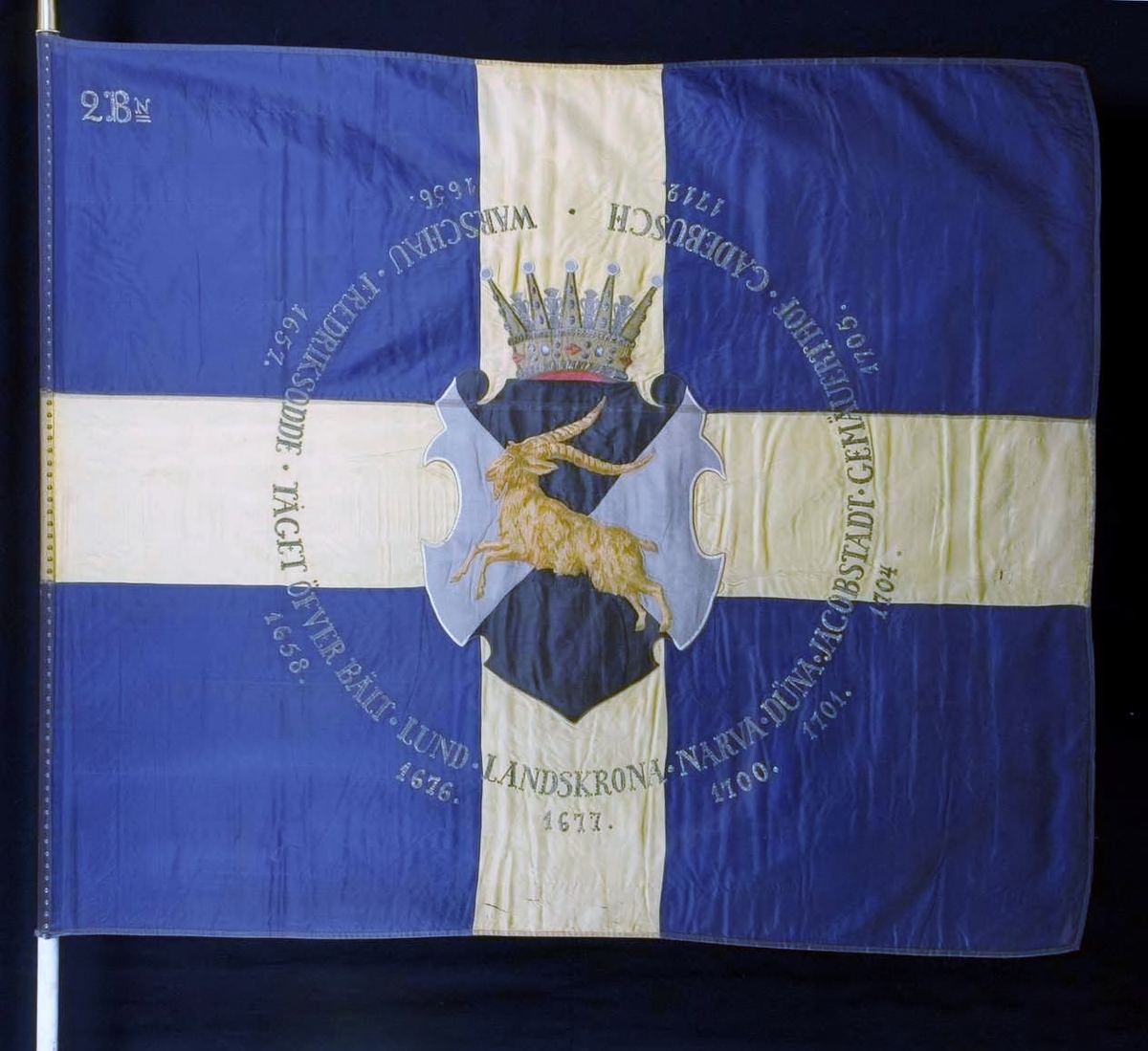
1897 colour of the 2nd Battalion, Hälsinge Regiment.

=== Coat of arms ===
The coat of the arms of the Hälsinge Regiment (I 14/Fo 21) 1977–1997 and the Gävleborg Group (Gävleborgsgruppen) since 1997. Blazon: The provincial badge of Hälsingland, saltire sable and argent, a buck rampant or, armed and langued gules. The shield surmounted two muskets in saltire or".

=== Medals ===
In 1959, the Hälsinge regementes (I 14) förtjänstmedalj ("Hälsinge Regiment (I 14) Medal of Merit") in gold (HälsregGM) of the 8th size was established. The same year, the Kungl. Hälsinge regementes belöningsmedalj ("Royal Hälsinge Regiment Medal of Reward") in gold (HälsregGM) was established. In 1959 and 1985, the Hälsinge regementes förtjänstmedalj ("Hälsinge Regiment Medal of Merit") in silver (HälsregSM) were established. The medals from 1959 and 1982 are of the 8th size. In 1992, the medals were reinstated as a Jeton, but then of the 12th size. The medal ribbons are divided in black and white moiré.

=== Heritage ===
In connection with the disbandment of the regiment, its traditions came from 1 January 1998 onwards to be continued by Gävleborg Group (Gävleborgsgruppen). From 1 July 2013 the Gävleborg Battalion, within the Gävleborg Group.

== Commanding officers ==
Regimental commanders active at the regiment during the years 1627–1997.

=== Commanders ===
- 1630–1360: Joachim Brahe
- 1630–1638: Åke Ulfsparre
- 1638–1645: Johan Oxenstierna
- 1645–1645: Johan Strijk
- 1645–1654: Gustaf Saabel
- 1654–1655: Gustaf Oxenstierna
- 1655–1660: Carl Larsson Sparre
- 1660–1669: Henrik Johan Taube
- 1670–1673: Anders Månsson Arenfeldt
- 1673–1683: Gustaf Karl von Wulffen
- 1683–1698: Ludvig Wilhelm Taube
- 1698–1700: Carl Gustaf Frölich
- 1700–1708: Jöran von Knorring
- 1708–1723: Gideon Fock
- 1710–1717: Reinhold Henrik Otto Horn
- 1717–1724: Lorentz von Nummers
- 1723–1738: Henrik Magnus von Buddenbrock
- 1739–1750: Johan Karl Silversparre
- 1750–1762: Reinhold Otto Fock
- 1762–1772: Anders Rudolf Du Rietz
- 1772–1776: Fredrik Gyllenswan
- 1776–1782: Arvid Nils Stenbock
- 1782–1809: Gustaf Wilhelm von Kaulbars
- 1809–1815: Fredrik Christian von Platen
- 1815–1847: Adolf Ludvig von Post
- 1847–1856: Charles Emil Rudbeck
- 1856–1860: Alexander Reuterskiöld
- 1860–1861: Sven Peter Bergman
- 1861–1864: Nils Henrik Hägerflycht
- 1864–1868: Axel Krister Gregersson Leijonhuvud
- 1868–1874: Ernst von Vegesack
- 1874–1882: Johan Gottlieb Wilhelm von Rehausen
- 1882–1893: Carl Bror Munck af Fulkila
- 1893–1901: Knut Robert Fabian Reuterskiöld
- 1901–1902: Johan Kasimir De la Gardie
- 1902–1909: Wilhelm Ernst von Krusenstjerna
- 1909–1915: Carl Alexander Fock
- 1915–1923: Georg Nyström
- 1923–1932: Henning Stålhane
- 1932–1933: Ernst Hortelius
- 1933–1934: Colonel Ernst af Klercker
- 1934–1940: Casper Ehrnborg
- 1941–1946: Carl Hamnström
- 1946–1955: Hans Berggren
- 1955–1957: Colonel Curt Göransson
- 1957–1967: Axel Henriksson
- 1967–1968: Colonel Nils Sköld
- 1968–1971: Jan Smedler
- 1968–1969: Carl-Henrik Gåsste (acting)
- 1971–1973: Carl-Henrik Gåsste
- 1973–1975: Allan Månsson
- 1975–1977: Colonel Robert Lugn (acting)
- 1975–1982: Senior colonel Carl-Henrik Gåsste
- 1982–1987: Ingmar Arnhall
- 1987–1991: Karl-Evert Englund
- 1991–1992: Folke Ekstedt
- 1993–1994: Senior colonel Hans Berndtson
- 1994–1994: Lars-Erik Ljungkvist (acting)
- 1994–1997: Tomas Bornestaf

=== Deputy commanders ===
- 1979–????: Colonel Paul Strömberg

== Names, designations and locations ==
| Name | Translation | From | | To |
|---|---|---|---|---|
| Joakim Brahes regemente | Joakim Brahe's Regiment | 1630-??-?? | – | 1634-??-?? |
| Kungl. Hälsinge regemente | Royal Hälsinge (Hälsingland) Regiment | 1634-??-?? | – | 1709-07-01 |
| Kungl. Hälsinge regemente | Royal Hälsinge (Hälsingland) Regiment | 1709-??-?? | – | 1713-05-06 |
| Kungl. Hälsinge regemente | Royal Hälsinge (Hälsingland) Regiment | 1713-??-?? | – | 1974-12-31 |
| Hälsinge regemente | Hälsinge (Hälsingland) Regiment | 1975-01-01 | – | 1997-06-30 |
| Designation | | From | | To |
| No. 14 | | 1816-10-01 | – | 1914-09-30 |
| I 14 | | 1914-10-01 | – | 1973-06-30 |
| I 14/Fo 49 | | 1973-07-01 | – | 1982-06-30 |
| I 14/Fo 21 | | 1982-07-01 | – | 1997-12-31 |
| Location | | From | | To |
| Florhed | | 1630-??-?? | – | 1689-??-?? |
| Mohed hed | | 1689-??-?? | – | 1909-02-14 |
| Gävle Garrison | | 1909-02-15 | – | 1997-12-31 |

== See also ==
- List of Swedish infantry regiments
