= Defence Staff (Sweden) =

Staff body of the Supreme Commander of Swedish Armed Forces

- Försvarsstaben
- Active: 1937–1994, 2023–present
- Country: Sweden
- Allegiance: Swedish Armed Forces
- Branch: Joint
- Type: Staff
- Role: Operational, territorial and tactical operations
- Garrison/HQ: Stockholm

Commanders
- Current commander: LtGen Carl-Johan Edström
- Chief of the Defence Staff: See list
- Vice Chief of the Defence Staff: See list

Insignia
- Colour

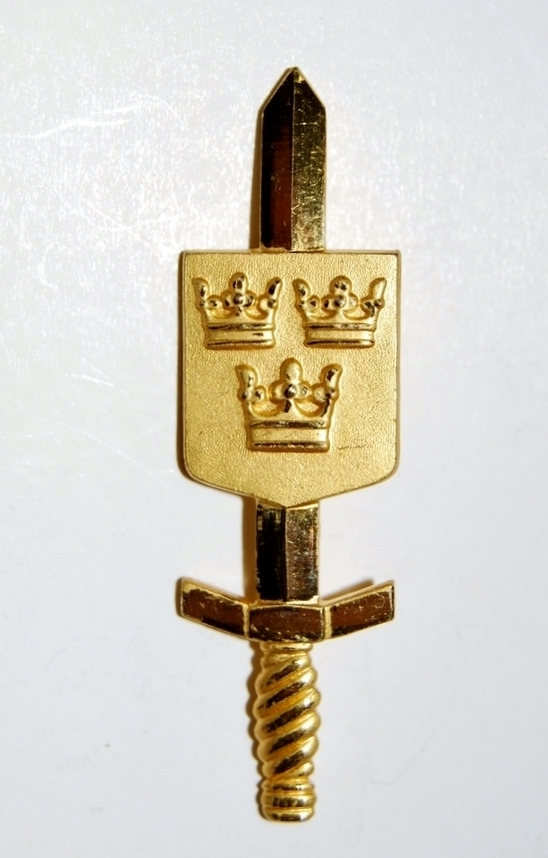
- Service insignia m/1960

The Defence Staff (Swedish: Försvarsstaben, Fst) is the Supreme Commander of the Swedish Armed Forces' staff body and command resource for military strategic command, mission dialogue and reporting to the Swedish government, as well as being responsible for the war organization's capability, availability and combat readiness. The latter with the support of the service branch commanders and the service branch staffs.

The Defence Staff was originally established in 1937 and was commanded by the Chief of the Defence Staff. Initially the tasks of the Defence Staff was limited to the overall military strategic and operational issues as well as to the central operational command of army forces. In 1961 a central operational command was added for the navy and air force. The Defence Staff ceased in connection with the reorganization of the Swedish Armed Forces in 1994 and with the creation of the Swedish Armed Forces Headquarters. Between 2007 and 2022, the Ledningsstaben (LEDS) in the Swedish Armed Forces Headquarters was called the Defence Staff in English and was commanded by the Chief of Defence Staff. The current Defence Staff was established on 1 January 2023.

== History ==
The Defence Staff was established on 1 July 1937 (SFS 1937:667) with the task of planning the use of the national defence funds and for the military branches perform the joint war preparations and to promote coherence and synergy between military branches. The Defence Staff was organized in 10 departments, Army Operational, Navy Operational, Air Force Operational, Military Signals, Cryptography, Air defence, Communications, Intelligence, War History and Photo Department. In 1942 the first major reorganization took place. The Defence Staff became the Supreme Commander's (ÖB) staff, organized in three sections, as well as a Naval and an Aviation Department (later to Section 1). Section 1 comprised six departments: Army, Quartermaster, Air defence, Communications, Signaling, Service and Photo Department. Section 2 comprised three departments: Foreign Affairs, Interior Affairs and War History Department and Section 3 two departments: the Press and Film as well as the Staff Welfare Department.

Next thorough reorganization of the Defence Staff occurred in 1961. An Operation Management (OPL 1 for Studies, OPL 2 for War Planning and OPL 3 for Preparedness and Exercises), four sections, one Administrative and Information Department and a Staff Welfare Bureau was formed. Section 1 comprised four departments, Public, Communication, Military Signals and Quartermaster Department, Section 2 three departments: Attaché, Intelligence and Domestic Department, Section 3 two departments: the Press and Film and War History Department, Section 4 Budget Detail and two departments, Research - and the Planning Department. An EDP office in Section 1 was established in 1965 (later the EDP Department). In 1968 the Total defence Signal Security Department (Totalförsvarets signalskyddsavdelning) was added (formerly the National Signal Security Commission (Statens signalskyddsnämnd)).

The Defence Staff was again reorganized in 1980 with an Operating Department, six operational sections, a Planning Department with the four planning sections, an Administrative Section and an Information Department. The agency, known as The Supreme Commander (Överbefälhavaren), according to instructions (SFS 1983:276), was exercising the leadership of the nations military defence and related operational activities. The Defence Staff that since 1 July 1981 was named Överbefälhavaren, was in connection with the Swedish Armed Forces restructuring on 1 July 1994 amalgamated with the Swedish Armed Forces Headquarters.

The new Defence Staff was re-established on 1 January 2023 through the disbandment of the Defence Staff (Note: Ledningsstaben (LEDS) was called the Defence Staff in English and existed from 2007 to 2022.) and the Training & Procurement Staff.

== Heraldry and traditions ==
=== Colours, standards and guidons ===
The colour of the Defence Staff was a double swallow-tailed Swedish flag, which was presented in 1992. It was later taken over by the Swedish Armed Forces Headquarters.

== Chiefs of the Defence Staff ==
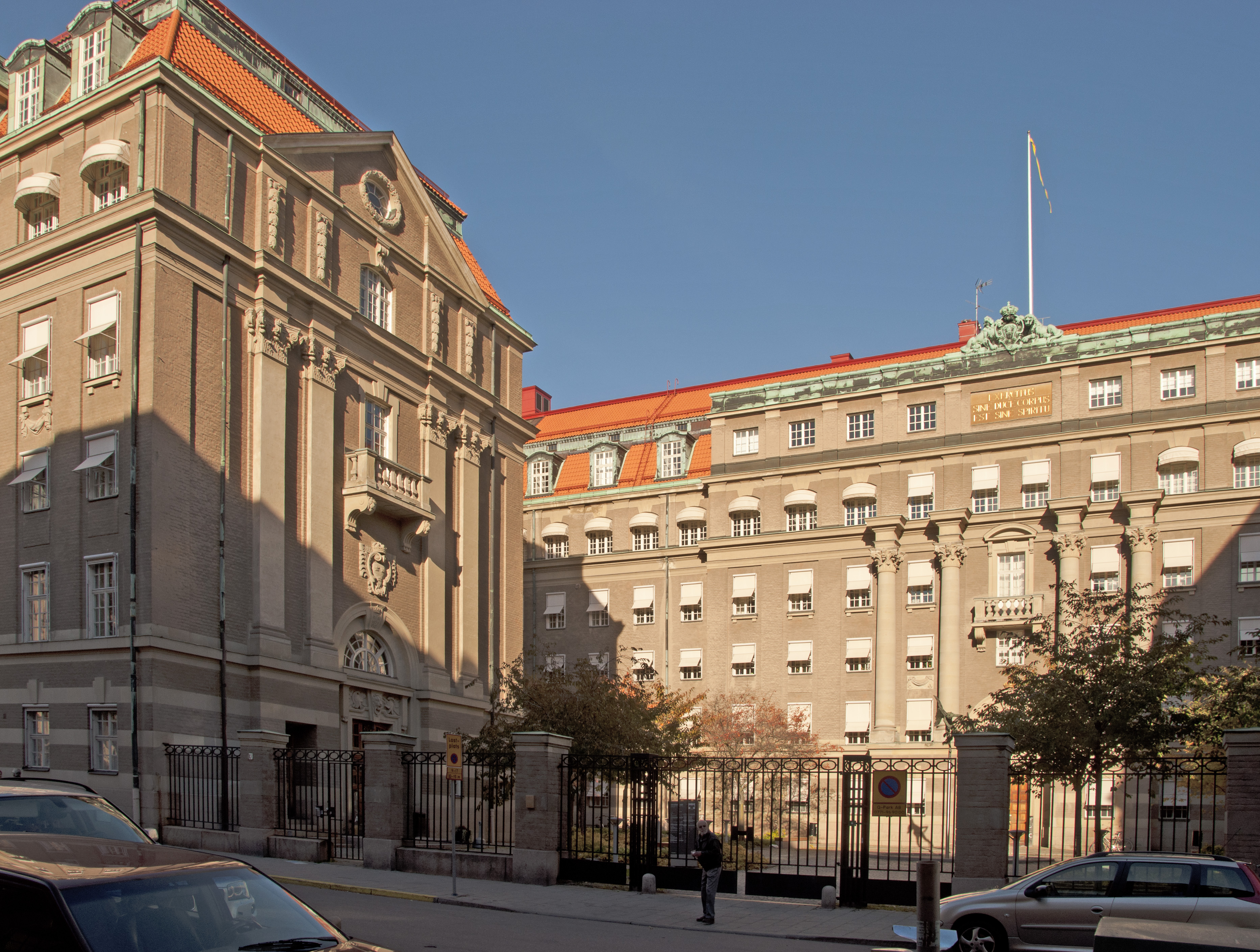
The Defence Staff was located at Östermalmsgatan 87 in Stockholm until 1981.

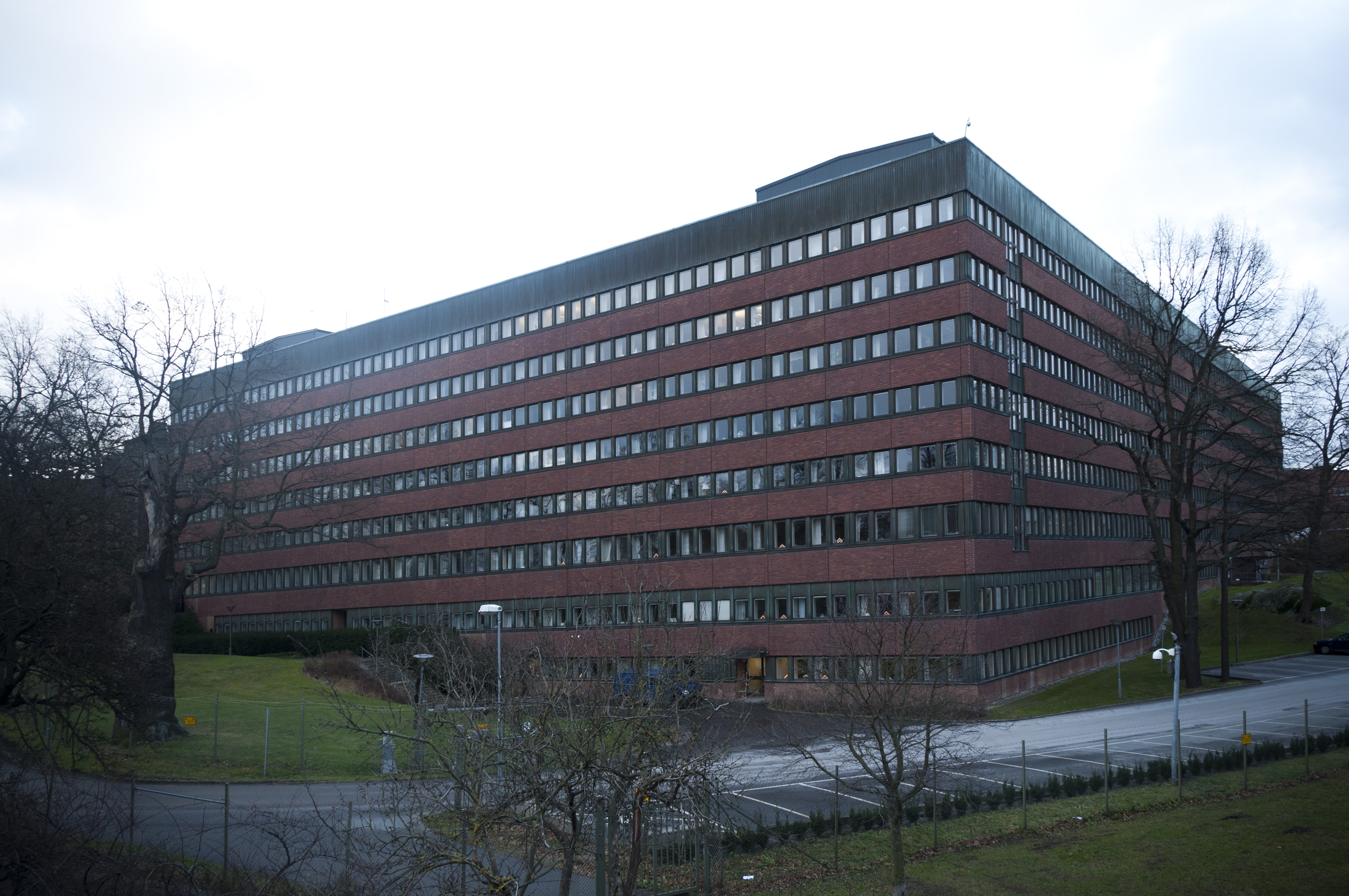
It was located at Lidingövägen 24 from 1981 to 1994 and again from 2023.
