= Life Guard Dragoons (Sweden) =

Swedish Army cavalry regiment (1949–2000)

- Livgardets dragoner
- Active: 1949–2000
- Country: Sweden
- Allegiance: Swedish Armed Forces
- Branch: Swedish Army
- Type: Cavalry
- Size: Regiment
- Part of: VII Military District (1949–1966); Eastern Military District (1966–1984); Svea Life Guards (1984–1994); Middle Military District (1994–2000)
- Garrison/HQ: Stockholm
- Colors: White and blue
- March: "Dragonerna komma" (Ericson) (Note: The march was established in 1953 by Army Order 33/1953.)
- Anniversaries: 4 December (Battle of Lund)
- Battle honours: Lützen (1632); Oldendorf (1633); Wittstock (1636); Leipzig (1642); Warsaw (1656); Frederiksodde (1657); March Across the Belts (1658); Lund (1676); Landskrona (1677); Düna (1701); Kliszów (1702); Pułtusk (1703); Holowczyn (1708); Helsingborg (1710); Svensksund (1790)

Insignia
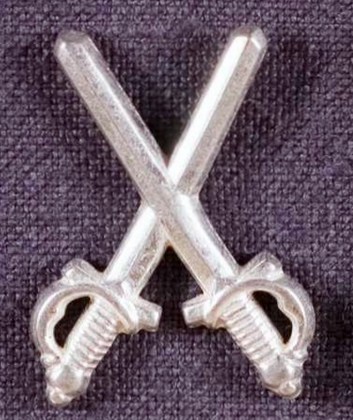
- Branch insignia

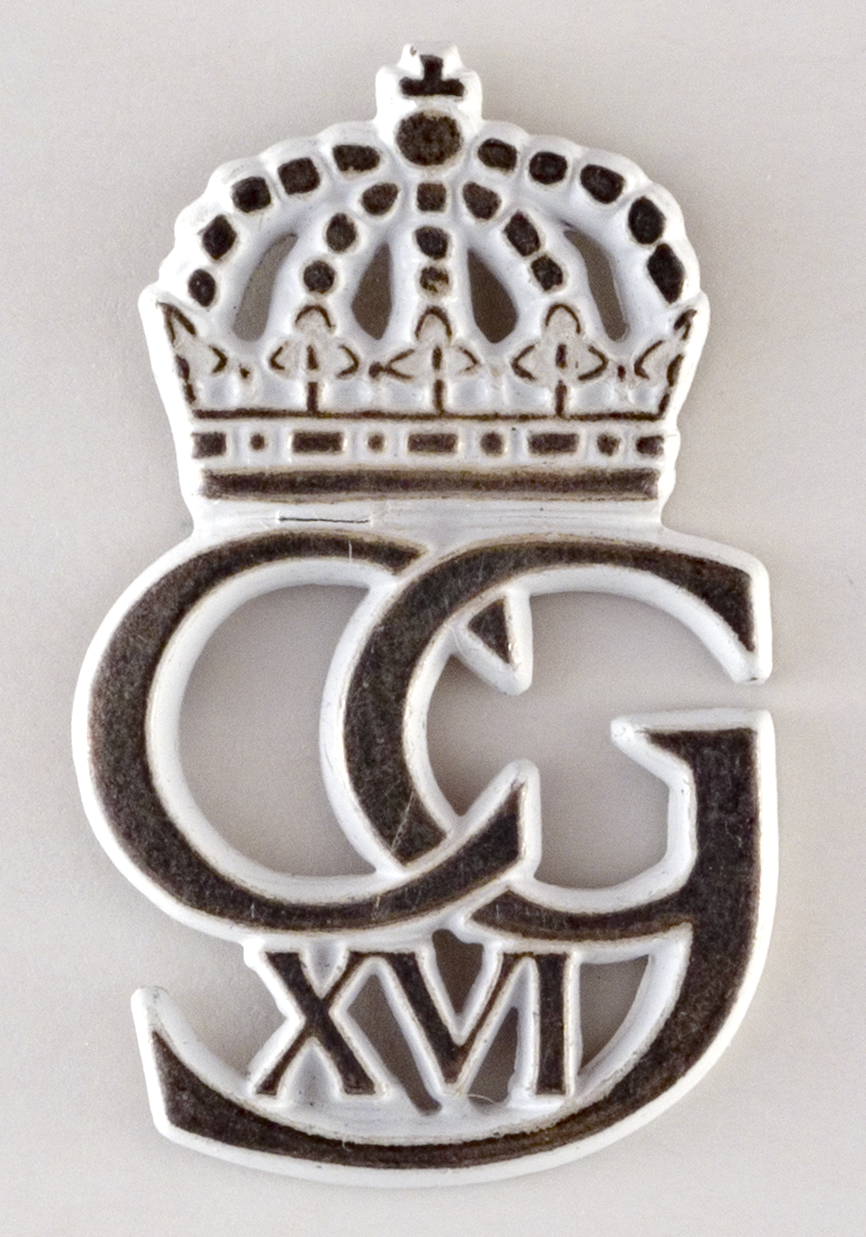
- Unit insignia

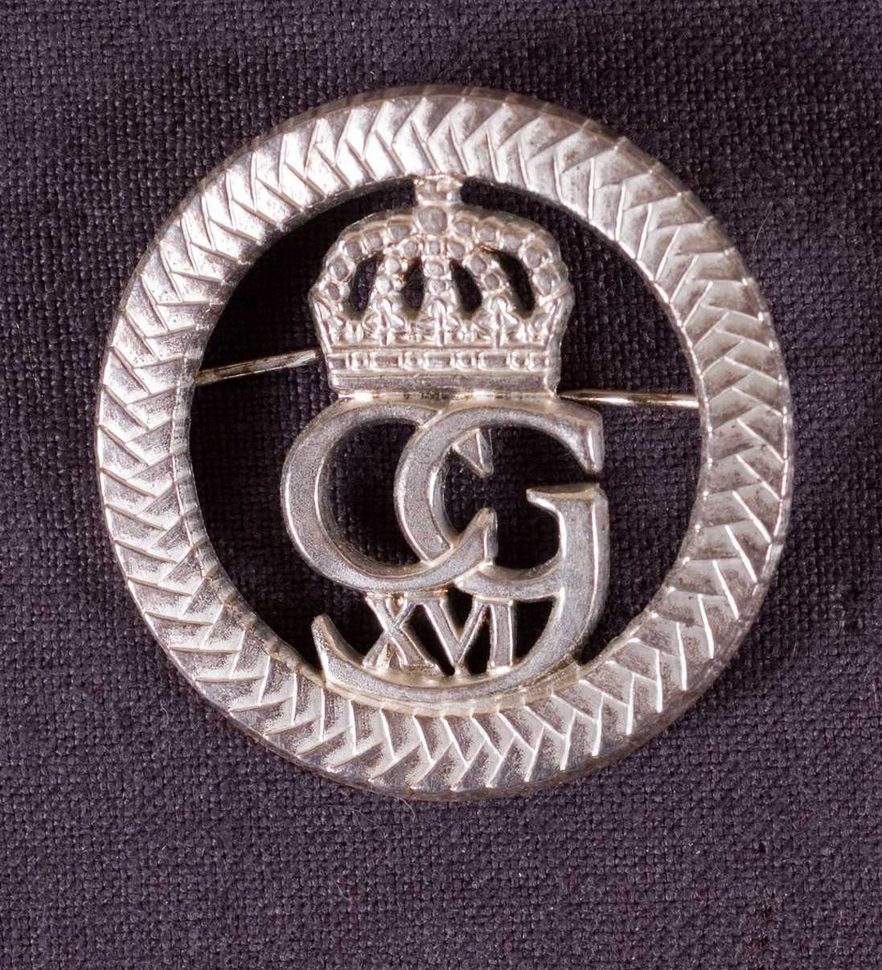
- Cap badge

The Life Guard Dragoons (Swedish: Livgardets dragoner), designated K 1, was a Swedish Army cavalry unit active from 1949 to 2000. The unit was formed as a squadron called the Life Guards Squadron (Livgardesskvadronen) in 1949, as a replacement for the previous K 1, the Life Regiment of Horse (1928–1948). In 1975 the squadron was expanded into a regiment, titled the Life Guard Dragoons with Stockholm Defence District (Livgardets dragoner med Stockholms försvarsområde K 1/Fo 44), redesignated the Life Guard Dragoons in 1984. The regiment had ceremonial mounted cavalry duties, as well as training recruits and providing part of the garrison in Stockholm. In accordance with that year's Defence Act, the regiment was amalgamated into the Life Guards in 2000, thus combining the infantry and cavalry guard units of the Swedish Army.

== History ==
The unit was formed as the Life Guards Squadron (Livgardesskvadronen, K 1) on 1 October 1949, this in conjunction when the Life Regiment of Horse (K 1) was disbanded according to the Defence Act of 1948. In the disbandment decision it was decided that a squadron would be maintained until further notice, where the Stockholm HQ Company (Stockholms stabskompani) would be included. In 1955 it was decided to retain the Life Guards Squadron as a partial mounted garrison unit, in order to cover the needs of the Royal Guard troops in Stockholm. The number of horses was reduced from 177 to 60.

In connection with OLLI reform, which was carried out within the Swedish defence during 1973–1975, the Life Guards Squadron was amalgamated with Stockholm Defence District (Fo 44) that afterwards adopted the name Life Guard Dragoons (Livgardets dragoner). From 1 July 1975 the defence district regiment K 1/Fo 44 was established. As a result, the Life Guard Dragoons within the Stockholm Defence District became an A unit (defence district regiment) and the Svea Life Guards (I 1), Svea Engineer Regiment (Ing 1) and Roslagen Anti-Aircraft Regiment (Lv 3) became B units (training units). The Life Guard Dragoons received the overall mobilization and material responsibility within the defence district, and the B units' responsibility was only as training units. With the reorganization into a regiment, followed a series of take-over of units from other units. Among other things, a Swedish Navy staff company was transferred to the Life Guard Dragoons. Furthermore, the military police education was in 1974 transferred from the Life Regiment Hussars (K 3) in Skövde to the Life Guard Dragoons. On 1 January 1977, the regiment was transferred responsibility for the Medical Training School (Medicinalfackskolan, MedfackS). On 1 July 1979 the regiment was transferred responsibility for the Frösunda Detachment.

Prior to the Defence Act of 1982, the Supreme Commander suggested that the command responsible for the Stockholm Defence District (Fo 44) would be transferred to the Svea Life Guards (I 1) by 1985 and the Life Guard Dragoons would amount to a training battalion within the Svea Life Guards. In the proposal he considered that a smaller portion would remain in Stockholm, including the garrison department, Home Guard and voluntary service department and a storage room. The Defence Committee shared the Supreme Commander's proposals, as there was a surplus of training places in the cavalry, and that it should seek to take advantage of the capacity of the units that were close to each other and thereby be able to disband or reorganize facilities for other purposes that then was occupied by the cavalry. Furthermore, the Defence Committee saw that it was natural that the Svea Life Guards took command of the Stockholm Defence District (Fo 44), so the responsibility for the production of brigades, mobilization and war planning were held together by one commander.

On 27 September 1984 a ceremony of the disbandment of the regiment was held, which officially was disbanded on 30 September 1984. From 1 October 1984 the defence district staff operated at the Svea Life Guards. The Medical Training School moved on 1 October 1984 to the Military Academy Karlberg. From 1 October 1984 the Life Guard Dragoons was included as a cavalry battalion in the Svea Life Guards. The barracks at Lidingövägen remained, but the designation was changed from K 1 to LGD, a designation which, however, would be replaced by the old designation K 1 in the fall of 1987 following the decision of the then army chief Erik G. Bengtsson. The battalion consisted of garrison post of the mounted Royal Guard, the Stockholm HQ Company which formed the 3rd Staff Squadron (3. stabsskvadronen), as well as a preparedness squadron was formed, the 4th Squadron (4. skvadronen). After the Defence Act of 1992, the cavalry battalion was separated from the Svea Life Guards on 30 June 1994. On 1 July 1994 it formed a cadre organized unit of the Middle Military District (Milo M). The Life Guard Dragoons (K 1) now were responsible for training of military police and military police ranger units.

Prior to the Defence Act of 2000, the government's starting point was that it only needed two units to meet the Swedish Armed Forces' future needs of different kinds of ranger units. One unit for the training of Norrland Rangers, and the other relating to training of intelligence and security units. When it came to which unit that would remain for the training of Norrland Rangers the Norrland Dragoon Regiment was chosen, where the choice had been between Norrland Dragoon Regiment (K 4) and Lapland Ranger Regiment (I 22). The choice of which units that would remain for the training of intelligence and security units, the government requirements where that the unit would have good training conditions and infrastructure, including training in parachuting and proximity to transport aircraft. The choice was between Life Guard Dragoons (K 1) and the Life Regiment Hussars (K 3). Regarding the Life Guard Dragoons, however, the government considered the unit lacked the conditions for the coordination and concentration which was considered necessary for a main unit for training of rangers. Thus, the government proposed in its act that the Life Regiment Hussars (K 3) and Norrland Dragoon Regiment (K 4) would remain in the basic organization, while the Life Guard Dragoons (K 1) and Lapland Ranger Regiment (I 22) would be disbanded. The Life Guard Dragoons (K 1) was disbanded on 30 June 2000. The majority of the staff and the duties were transferred to the Dragon Battalion in the new Life Guards (LG), which is also the tradition taker for the Life Guard Dragoons.

== Units ==
=== Medical Training School ===
The Medical Training School (Medicinalfackskolan, MedfackS) was formed in Rissne in 1964 as the Swedish Army Medical Specialist School (Arméns medicinalfackskola, MedfackS) and part of Swedish Ordnance Administration School (Tygförvaltningsskolan). The school was responsible for the army's central training of medical personnel for the army's war units. On 1 March 1970, the school was relocated to Frösunda, after the Swedish Army Medical Specialist School took over parts of the establishment in Frösunda. On 1 January 1977, the school was separated from the Swedish Army Medical Specialist School and formed its own school, which, however, was subordinated in administrative terms to the Life Guard Dragoons. On 1 July 1981, the school got a provisional organization and adopted the name Medicinalfackskolan (MedfackS). After Life Guard Dragoons was disbanded as an independent administrative unit and was amalgamated into the Svea Life Guards, on 1 October 1984, the Medicinalfackskolan was transferred to the Military Academy Karlberg, which it was simultaneously co-located with. On 1 July 1986, the school was reorganized into the Swedish Armed Forces Medical College (Försvarets sjukvårdshögskola, FSjvHS), which on 1 July 1994 was amalgamated into the Medical Center of the Swedish Armed Forces.

=== Stockholm Defence District ===
The Stockholm Defence District (Fo 44) was formed on 1 October 1942 and had its staff located in Stockholm Garrison. On 1 January 1947, parts of Norrtälje Defence District (Fo 45) were amalgamated into the defence district. On 1 July 1975, Vaxholm Defence District (Fo 46) was added, which meant that Stockholm Defence District covered the entire Stockholm County. In connection with the OLLI reform on 1 July 1975, the Stockholm Defence District was given joint staff with the Life Guard Dragoons (K 1). Through this reorganization, the defence district staff was located with the regiment at Lidingövägen. Through the Defence Act of 1982, the defence district staff was transferred to the Svea Life Guards, both organizationally and that it was located in Kungsängen with the rest of the regimental staff. Stockholm Defence District was disbanded together with Svea Life Guards on 30 June 2000.

=== Stockholm HQ Company ===
The Stockholm HQ Company (Stockholms stabskompani, Ss) was a staff company formed by the Defence Act of 1942. The company was originally intended to be a staff squadron in the Life Regiment of Horse (K 1). Due to lack of space at the Life Regiment of Horse, the company was instead placed in the barracks of the Stockholm Anti-Aircraft Regiment (Lv 3). The company consisted of 190 conscripts, who served as assistance conscripts at the higher staffs in Stockholm. Before the Life Regiment of Horse was disbanded, the Chief of the Army proposed to place the company at the Life Regiment of Horse at Lidingövägen, in order to free up space at the anti-aircraft regiment. Once the Life Regiment of Horse was disbanded, the company would simultaneously be subordinated to the military commander of IV Military District, and be referred to as the Stockholms stabskompani (Ss). From 1 October 1949, the company came to belong to the Life Guards Squadron, however, the two units did not have a uniform command. In 1955, the Swedish government considered that the company was in great need of relocating to Lidingövägen, in order to be amalgamated with the Life Guards Squadron under a unified command, which in administrative terms would be connected to staff of the IV Military District. As parts of the central command of the Swedish Armed Forces were relocated from Stockholm, the need for assistance conscripts was reduced. As a result, in the late 1970s, the Swedish Navy HQ Company (Marinens stabskompani) became part of Stockholm HQ Company. When the Life Guard Dragoons was disbanded as an independent administrative unit and was amalgamated into the Svea Life Guards, the Stockholm HQ Company was also amalgamated into the Svea Life Guards, where from 1 October 1984 the Stockholm HQ Company formed the 3rd Staff Squadron (3. stabsskvadronen) in the cavalry battalion.

== Locations and training areas ==
=== Barracks ===
The Life Guards Squadron was located in the barracks that previously was used by the Life Regiment of Horse (K 1). The barracks were built in 1897 after the building program of the Defence Act of 1892, and designed by Erik Josephson. During the years 1975-1981 the defence district staff at the regiment was localized to the staff house at Lidingövägen, since 1994 the staff location for the Swedish Armed Forces Headquarters.

When the regiment was disbanded in 1984 and was merged with the Svea Life Guards, the battalion management was located in Kungsängen from 1984 to 1985, while the barracks 1 and 2 was used by the cavalry battalion. The redundant barracks and grounds, the chancellery barracks, which is a listed building, then came to be used for co-location of central staffs and authorities in the Stockholm region.

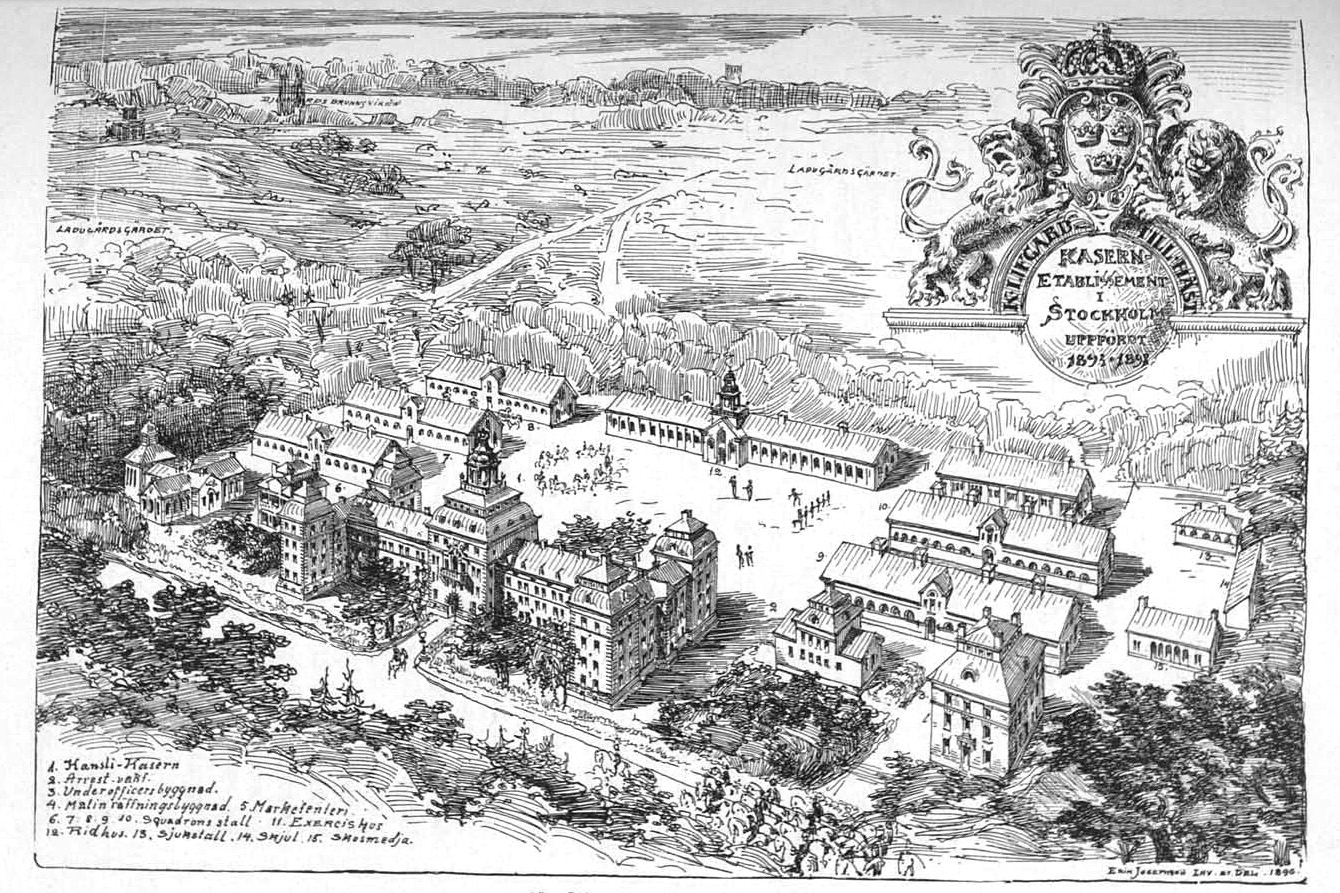
Sketch of the area

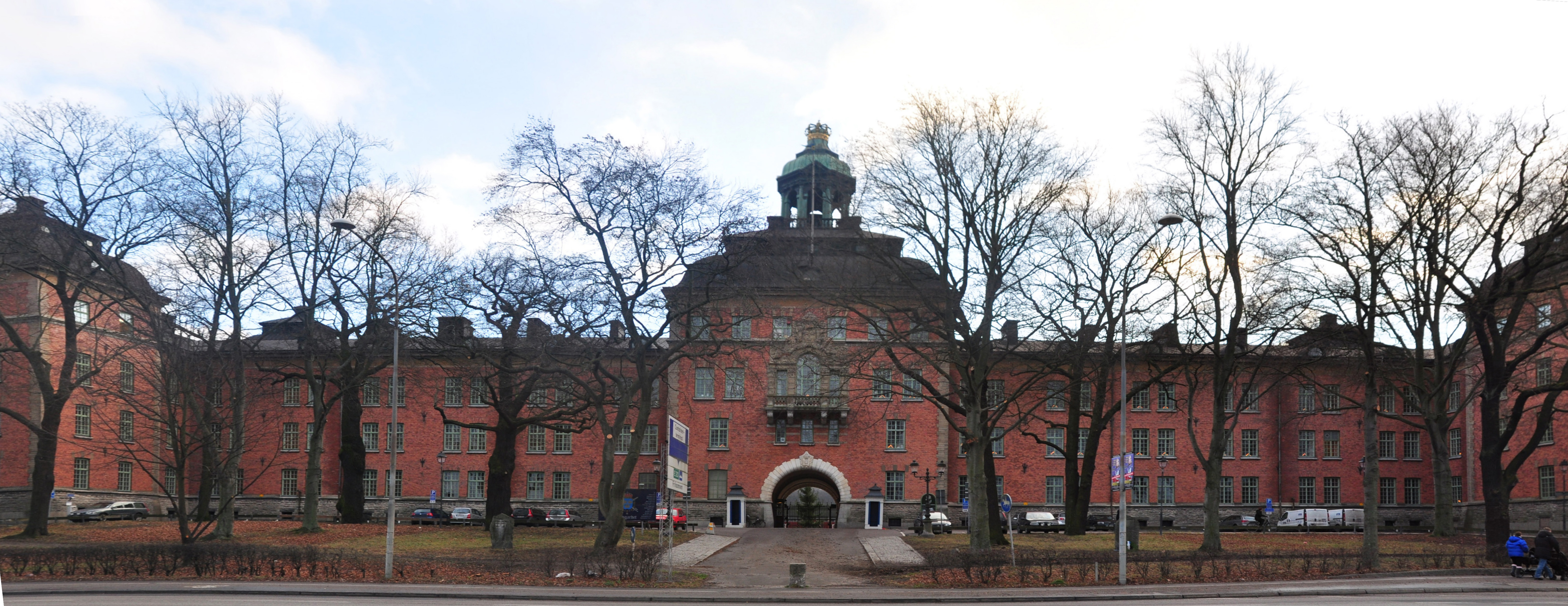
Main building

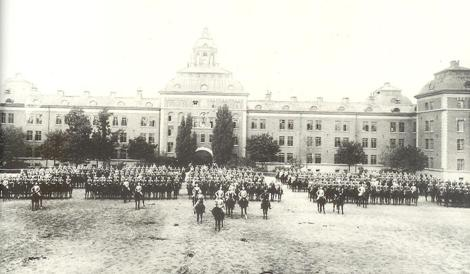
Courtyard

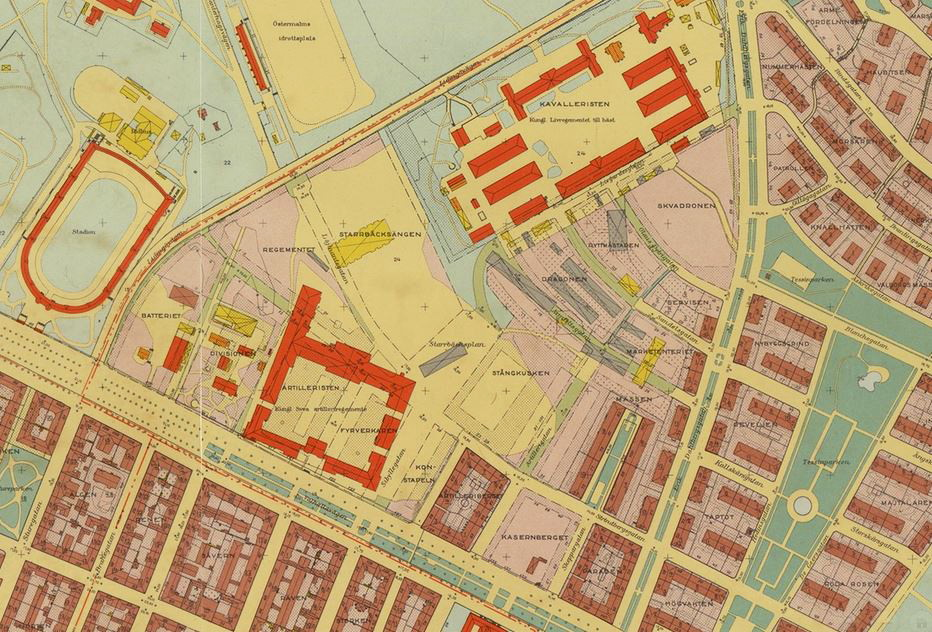
1940 map over the area

=== Training areas ===
The regiment trained at northern Djurgården, Järvafältet and later at Kungsängen.

== Heraldry and traditions ==
=== Colours, standards and guidons ===
In conjunction with the Life Guards Squadron was formed on 1 October 1949, it took over the standard (m/1928) that had previously been carried by the Life Regiment of Horse (K 1). That standard had been presented on 16 June 1928 by His Majesty the King Gustaf V at the barracks yard. When the regiment again became independent on 1 July 1994, His Majesty the King Carl XVI Gustaf presented on 4 December 1995 (the regimental memorial day of the battle of Lund 1676) a new standard (m/1994) to the regiment. On the 1995 colour the Battle of Svensksund was added as battle honour. After the regiment was disbanded on 30 June 2000, its standard was transferred to the Life Guards who carries it alongside the colour of the Svea Life Guards.

The 1995 standard was drawn by Bengt Olof Kälde and embroidered by hand in insertion technique by Maj-Britt Salander/company Blå Kusten. Blazon: "On white cloth in the centre the Swedish Royal coat of arms as to the law without mantle. In each corner a royal crown proper with red lining. On the reverse battle honours (Lützen 1632, Lund 1676, Oldendorf 1633, Landskrona 1677, Wittstock 1636, Düna 1701, Leipzig 1642, Kliszow 1702, Warsaw 1656, Pultusk 1703, Fredriksodde 1658, Holovczyn 1708, Tåget över Bält 1658, Hälsingborg 1710, Halmstad 1676, Svensksund 1790) horizontally placed and in each corner three open crowns placed two and one (a legacy from the former Royal Life Regiment Dragoons, K 2), all yellow. White fringe." The standard was also carried by the Life Guards Dragoon Battalion (Livgardets dragonbataljon). The standard was taken out of service on 19 March 2014 when a new was handed over by the king.

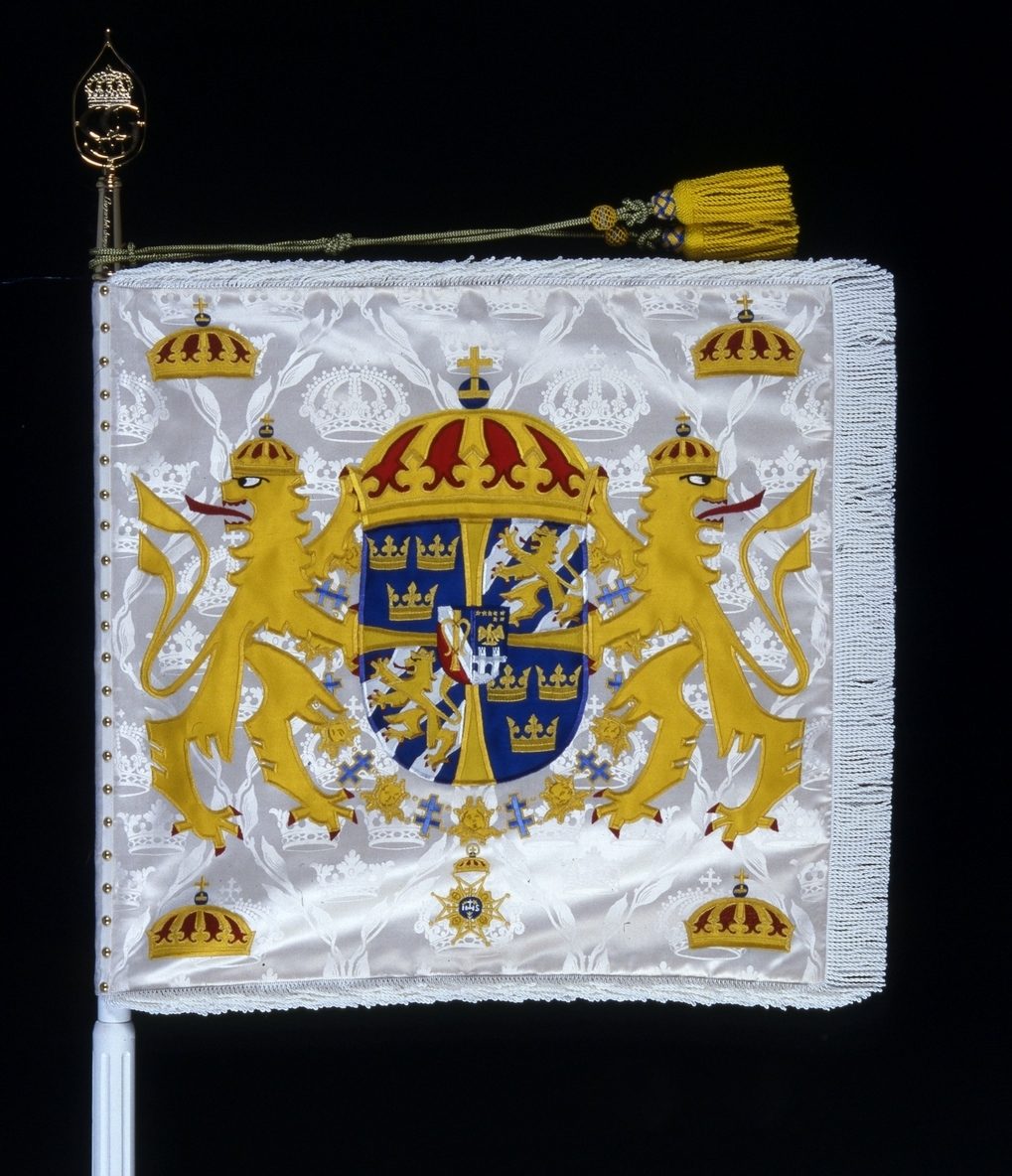
1995 standard (front)

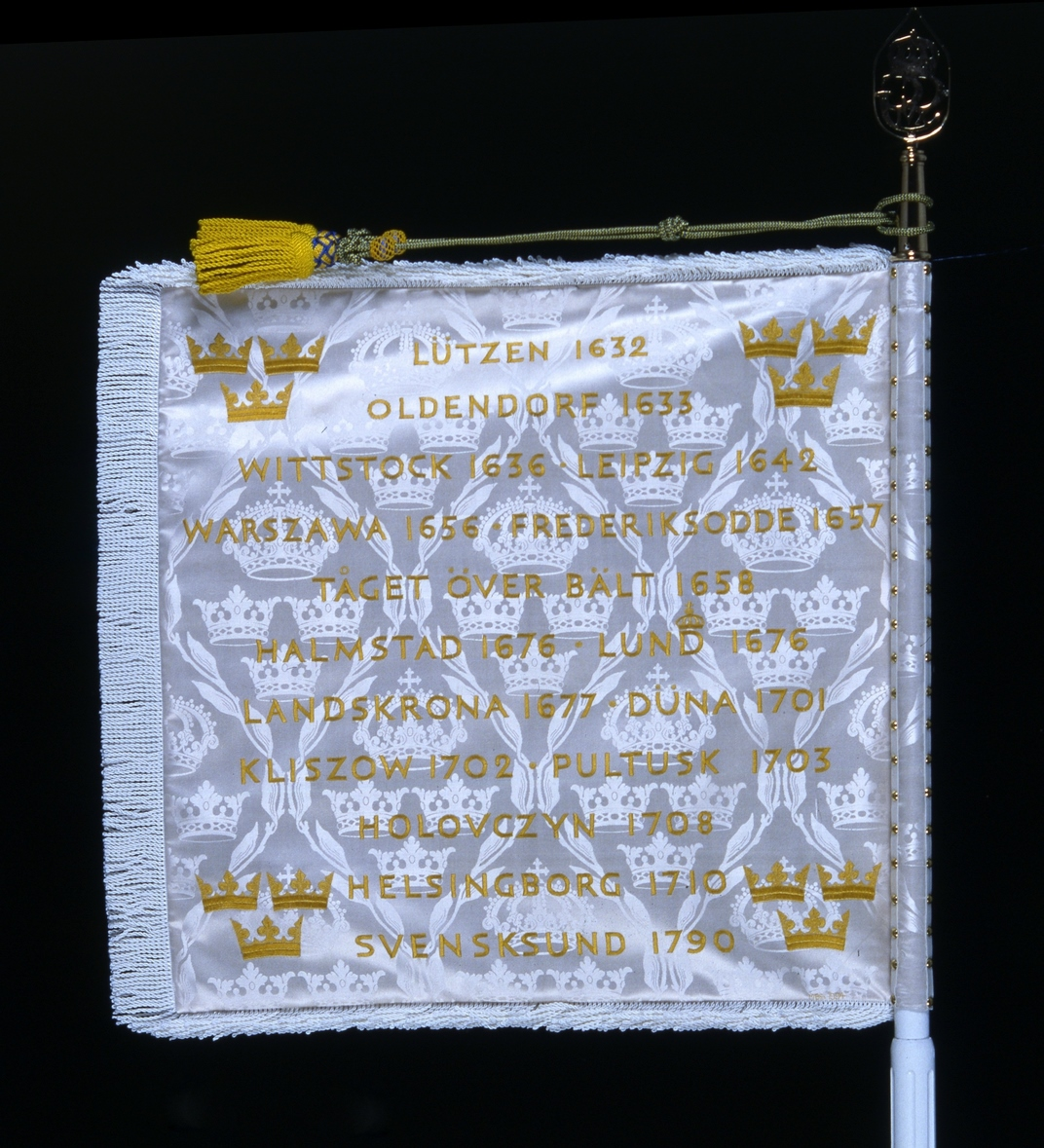
1995 standard (back)

=== Coat of arms ===
The coat of the arms of the Life Guard Dragoons (K 1/Fo 44) 1977–1984, the Life Guard Dragoon at I 1/Fo 44 1984–1994 and the Life Guard Dragoons (K 1) 1994–2000. Blazon: "Azure, the lesser coat of arms of Sweden, three open crowns or, placed two and one. The shield surmounted two rapiers in saltire argent and surrounded by the chain of the Royal Order of the Seraphim or underneath the rapiers and the crown."

=== Medals ===
In 1993, the Livgardets dragoners (K 1) förtjänstmedalj ("Life Guard Dragoons (K 1) Medal of Merit") in gold and silver (LGDGM/SM) was established. The medal is a Maltese cross and the medal ribbon is of blue moiré with a white stripe on each side. His Majesty the King's monogram in gold/silver is attached to the ribbon.

Ribbon bar

=== Other ===
The regiment's anniversary day is 4 December as the memory of the Battle of Lund on 4 December 1676. The regimental traditions are conducted since 1 July 2000 by the Life Guards (LG).

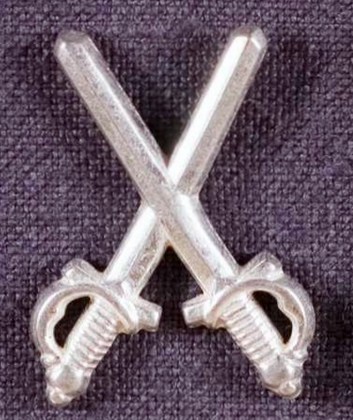
Branch insignia m/1960

Unit insignia m/1950-60

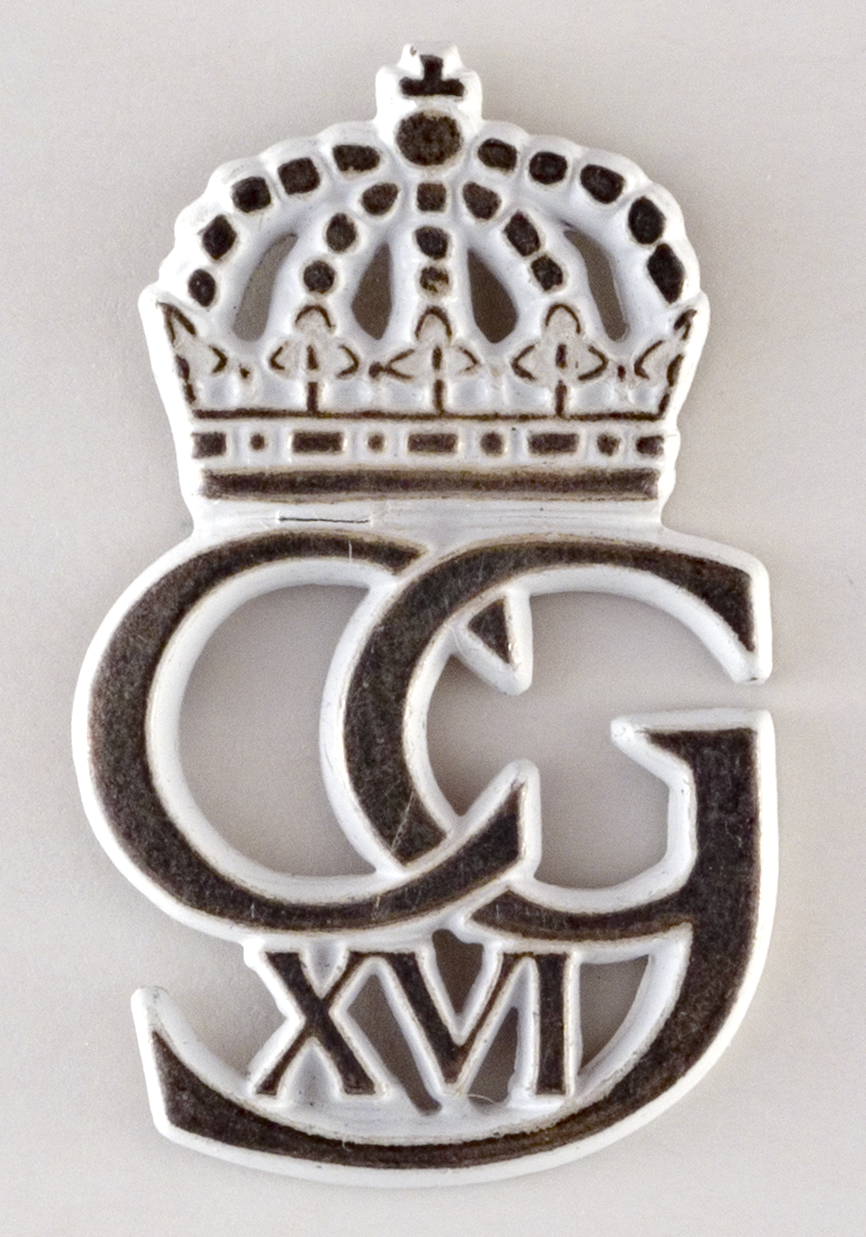
Unit insignia m/74

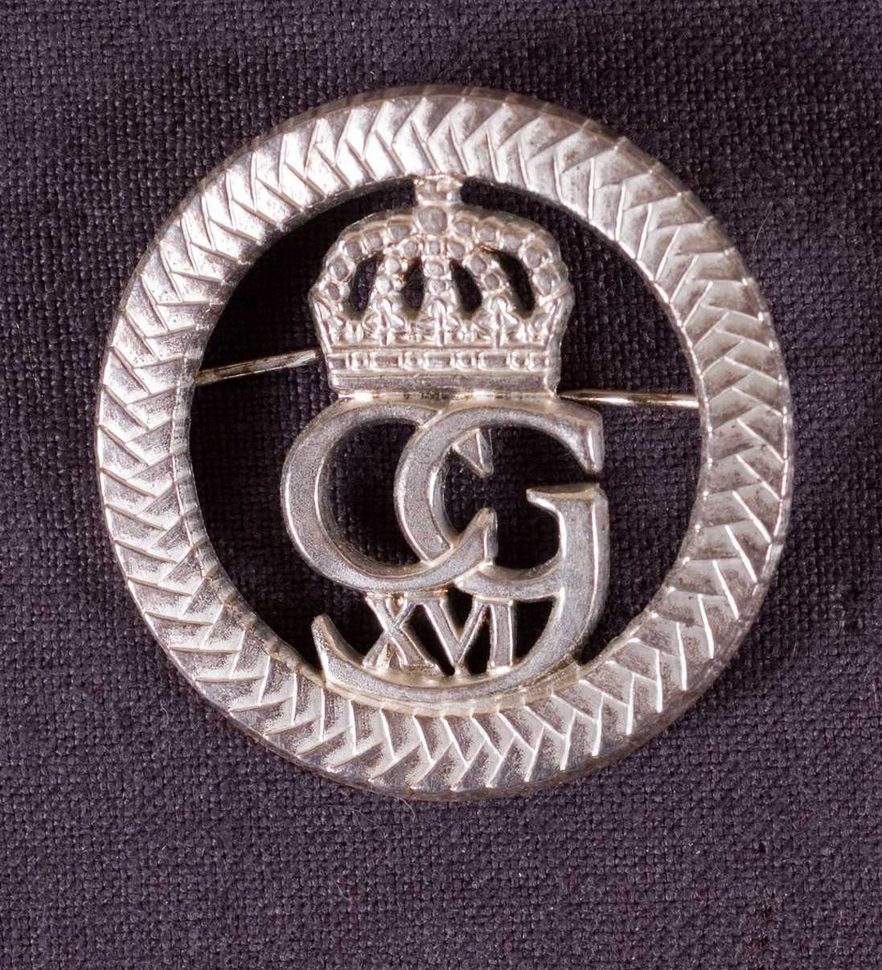
Cap badge m/1996

== Commanding officers ==
Executive officers and regimental commanders active at the regiment from 1949. Executive officer (Sekundchef) was a title that was used until 31 December 1974 at the regiments and units that were part of the King's Life and Household Troops (Kungl. Maj:ts Liv- och Hustrupper). His Majesty the King was regimental commander during the years 1949–1974. From 1975, the monarch was honorary commander of the regiment. The executive officer of the Life Guards Squadron was during the years 1949-1974 the battalion commander. During the years 1984-1994 the commander was named battalion commander.

=== Regimental commanders ===
- 1949–1950: Gustaf V
- 1950–1973: Gustaf VI Adolf
- 1973–1974: Carl XVI Gustaf
- 1975–1976: Colonel 1st rank Nils Östlund
- 1976–1981: Colonel 1st rank Niklas Landergren
- 1981–1984: Colonel 1st rank Hodder Stjernswärd
- 1984–1988: Lieutenant Colonel Alexander von Rosen (Battalion commander)
- 1988–1991: Lieutenant Colonel Nils Edström (Battalion commander)
- 1991–1993: Lieutenant Colonel Claes Grafström (Battalion commander)
- 1993–1996: Lieutenant Colonel Lars-Olof Nilsson
- 1996–2000: Colonel Carol Paraniak

=== Executive officers ===
- 1949–1952: Major Gustaf Nyblæus
- 1952–1955: Lieutenant Colonel Anders Grafström
- 1955–1959: Major Bengt Ljungquist
- 1959–1961: Major Nils-Fredrik Haegerström
- 1961–1972: Lieutenant Colonel Hans Skiöldebrand
- 1972–1974: Lieutenant Colonel Hodder Stjernswärd
- 1974–1975: Lieutenant Colonel Hans von Schreeb

== Names, designations and locations ==
Name	Translation	From		To
Kungl Livgardesskvadronen	Royal Life Guards Squadron	1949-10-01	–	1974-12-31
Livgardesskvadronen	Life Guards Squadron	1975-01-01	–	1975-06-30
Livgardets dragoner med Stockholms försvarsområde	Life Guard Dragoons with Stockholm Defence District	1975-07-01	–	1984-09-30
Livgardets dragoner	Life Guard Dragoons	1984-10-01	–	2000-06-30
Designation		From		To
K 1		1949-10-01	–	1975-06-30
K 1/Fo 44		1975-07-01	–	1984-09-30
LGD		1984-10-01	–	1987-09-30
K 1		1987-10-01	–	2000-06-30
Location		From		To
Stockholm Garrison		1949-10-01	–	2000-06-30

== See also ==
- List of Swedish cavalry regiments
