= Life Regiment of Horse =

The Life Regiment of Horse was refer too:

- Life Regiment of Horse (1667–1791), a Swedish Army cavalry unit
- Life Regiment of Horse (1928–1949), a Swedish Army cavalry unit
