= Carl-Axel Torén =

Swedish colonel and sportsman

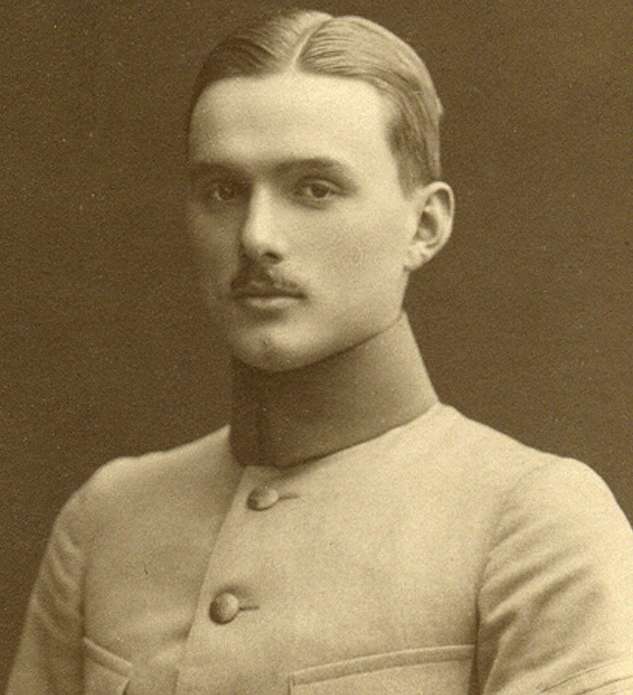
- Born: Carl-Axel Oscar Torén; 8 March 1887; Stockholm, Sweden
- Died: 21 October 1961 (aged 74); Saltsjöbaden, Sweden
- Military career
- Allegiance: Sweden
- Branch: Swedish Army
- Service years: 1910–1947
- Rank: Colonel
- Commands: Life Regiment of Horse

Carl-Axel Oscar Torén (8 March 1887 – 21 October 1961) was a Swedish Army officer and horse rider who competed in the 1912 Summer Olympics. He finished 13th in the individual jumping event with his horse Falken.

== Early life ==
Torén was born on 8 March 1887 in Stockholm, Sweden, the son of major general Gabriel Torén (1858–1919) and his wife Mary Hummel. He first trained in sprint running, but then changed to horse riding, as his father was an equestrian official and organizer of equestrian events at the 1912 Olympics. He became Swedish champion in running 400 meters in 1906. He broke the Scandinavian record in the same in 1906. Torén had four brothers. One of them, Helge (1891–1954), competed internationally in middle-distance running and held a national record over 800 m.

== Career ==
Torén was commissioned as an officer with the rank of underlöjtnant in the Life Regiment Hussars in 1910. He attended the Royal Swedish Army Staff College from 1916 to 1918 and then served as an aspirant in the General Staff from 1919 to 1920 and from 1922 to 1923. Torén was promoted to ryttmästare in 1925 and was a cadet officer at the Military Academy Karlberg from 1925 to 1929. He was promoted to major, served in Norrland Dragoon Regiment in 1934, and was promoted to lieutenant colonel in 1937. Torén then served as a military attache in Warsaw, Prague and in Bucharest from 1937 to 1940. In 1939, he was promoted to colonel and in 1940 to colonel in the reserve. He was appointed executive officer of the Life Regiment of Horse in 1940. Torén became head of the administrative corps of the Swedish Cavalry in 1943.

Torén was also a board member of the Sv. bot. förening, Föreningen för dendrologi och parkvård ("Association for Dendrology and Park Care"), chairman of the board of Föreningen Gamla djursholmare ("Association for former people from Djursholm"), in the Friends of the Life Regiment of Horse Association, in Saltsjöbadens villaägarförening ("Saltsjöbaden Homeowners' Association") and in the Saltsjöbaden Parent Teacher Association (Föreningen Hem och skola i Saltsjöbaden).

== Personal life ==
In 1919, Torén married Lilly Nordenson (1896–1940), the daughter of Erik Nordenson and Bertha Kleman. With Lilly, he had the children Carola (born 1920), Anne-Marie (1922–1931), Hans-Gabriel (born 1925), Harriet (born 1928) and Eva (born 1931). In 1941, he married Baroness Anita Bennet (born 1904), the daughter of Baron Jacob Bennet and Anna Rosenblad. They had one child, Inga (born 1943).

== Dates of rank ==
- 1910 – Underlöjtnant
- 19?? – Lieutenant
- 1925 – Ryttmästare
- 1934 – Major
- 1937 – Lieutenant Colonel
- 1939 – Colonel

== Awards and decorations ==
- (Sweden) Commander 1st Class of the Order of the Sword
- (Sweden) Knight of the Order of Vasa
- (Nazi Germany) 1st Class of the Order of the German Eagle

Military offices
Preceded by Henry Peyron	Life Regiment of Horse; 1940–1947	Succeeded by Carl Henrik Wrede af Elimä
