= Henry Peyron =

Swedish fencer (1883–1972)

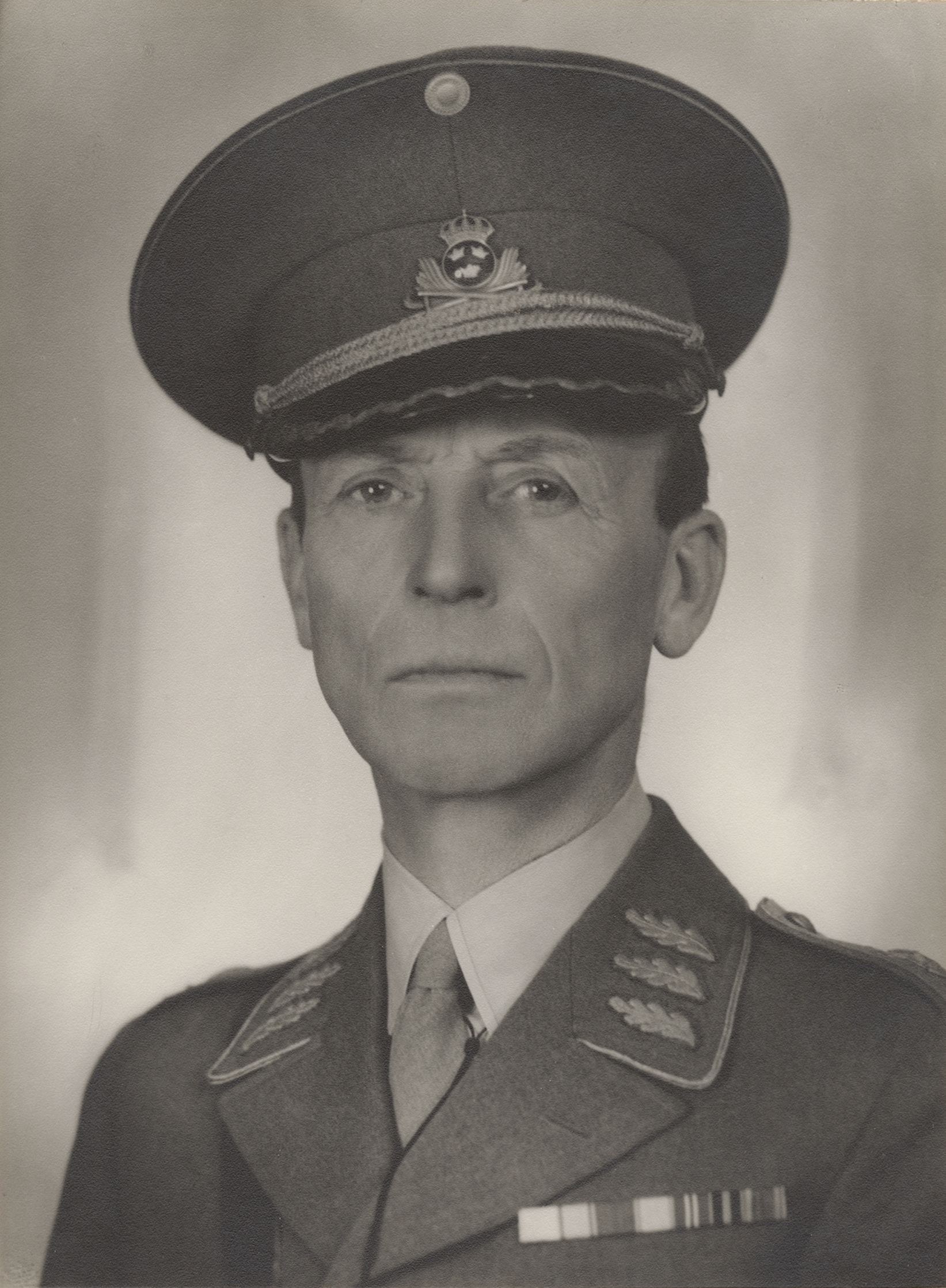
- Born: Henry Georg Rudolf Peyron; 14 June 1883; Stockholm, Sweden
- Died: 18 February 1972 (aged 88); Stockholm, Sweden
- Burial place: Norra begravningsplatsen
- Relatives: Lennart Peyron (son)
- Military career
- Allegiance: Sweden
- Branch: Swedish Army
- Service years: 1903–1943
- Rank: Major General (Sweden); Lieutenant Colonel (Finland)
- Commands: Life Regiment Hussars; Life Regiment of Horse; Inspector of the Cavalry
- Conflicts: Finnish Civil War; Battle of Tampere; Battle of Vyborg

Major General Henry Georg Rudolf Peyron (14 June 1883 – 19 February 1972) was a senior Swedish Army officer and a fencer. He competed in the individual and team épée events at the 1908 Summer Olympics.

== Early life ==
Peyron was born on 14 June 1883 in Stockholm, Sweden, the son of vice admiral Edvard Svante Knut Peyron and his wife Kathinka Karen Aleta Due. He was the brother of the naval officer Edvard Svante Knut Peyron. He passed mogenhetsexamen in Stockholm in 1901 and Peyron became underlöjtnant in the Life Regiment Dragoons in 1903.

== Career ==
Peyron attended the Royal Swedish Army Staff College from 1910 to 1912, was an aspirant in the General Staff from 1913 to 1915 and was appointed captain of the General Staff 1917. He returned the same year as ryttmästare to the Life Regiment Dragoons. Peyron, who had left the Swedish Army in 1918, took part in the Finnish Civil War as a General Staff officer at headquarters. He participated there, among other things, to the plans of the Tampere and the Vyborg operations and was appointed Finnish lieutenant colonel. Back in the Swedish Army, he served as a military attaché in Rome from 1919 to 1921, became a major in the army in 1924, was a military attaché in Berlin from 1924 to 26 and chief of staff at the Cavalry Inspectorate (Kavalleriinspektionen) from 1926 to 1932. He was promoted to major in the General Staff in 1926 and lieutenant colonel in 1928.

During the interwar period, Peyron sought to find ways to counteract the cavalry's downsizing. While maintaining the traditional cavalry name, the units would be composed of parts with such different marching capabilities as "cavalrymen", bicycle troops and motorized troops. In 1932, Peyron became lieutenant colonel in the Life Regiment Hussars in Skövde, was promoted to colonel in the army in 1934 and was the regiment's executive commander from 1935 to 1937, after which he was executive commander until 1940 of the Life Regiment of Horse. In 1943, Peyron was promoted to major general and appointed Inspector of the Cavalry. In this position, Peyron sought to promote the field operations of the units. He took special interest in the tactics. During World War II, Peyron was first commander of the cavalry brigade and then for a long time carried out operations as division commander in Värmland. He retired from active service in 1943.

Peyron was chairman of Skövde Cross Country Riding Club (Skövde fältrittklubb) from 1933 to 1937, vice chairman of Stockholm Cross Country Riding Club from 1937 to 1940 and a member of the Swedish Equestrian Federation (Svenska ridsportens centralförbund) from 1937 to 1943.

== Personal life ==
In 1908, Peyron married Louise Reuterskiöld (1887–1967), the daughter of the envoy Lennart Reuterskiöld and Louise Nordenfalk. They had four children: major general Lennart Peyron (1909–1981), artist Louise Peyron-Carlberg (1911–1978), translator Elsie Tollet (1914–1981) and major general Gustaf Peyron (1921–2007).

== Death ==
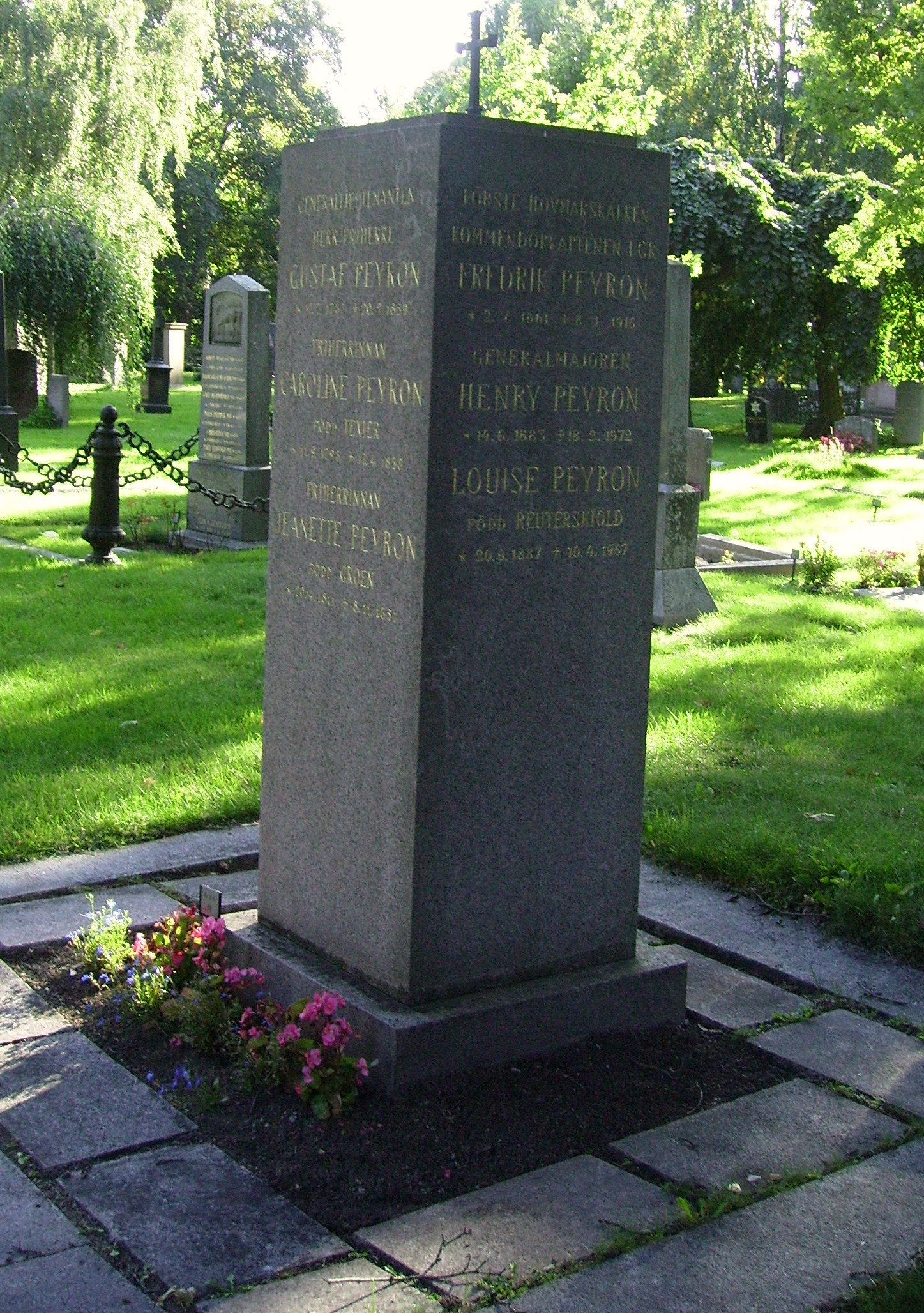
Henry Peyron's gravestone at Norra begravningsplatsen.

Peyron died on 18 February 1972. He was interred at Norra begravningsplatsen in Solna Municipality on 28 April 1972.

== Dates of rank ==
=== Swedish Army ===
- 1903 – Underlöjtnant
- 1906 – Lieutenant
- 1917 – Captain
- 1924 – Major
- 1928 – Lieutenant Colonel
- 1937 – Colonel
- 1940 – Major general

=== Finnish Army ===
- 1918 – Lieutenant Colonel

== Awards and decorations ==
=== Swedish ===
- (Sweden) King Gustaf V's Jubilee Commemorative Medal (16 June 1928)
- (Sweden) Commander 1st Class of the Order of the Sword (6 June 1940)
- (Sweden) Knight of the Order of the Sword (6 June 1924)
- (Sweden) Knight of the Order of Vasa (10 December 1927)
- (Sweden) Swedish Fencing Federation Honorary Shield (Svenska fäktförbundets hederssköld) (1932)

=== Foreign ===
- (Finland) Order of the Cross of Liberty, 1st Class with star
- (Finland) Order of the Cross of Liberty, 2nd Class with swords (1918)
- (Finland) Order of the Cross of Liberty, 3rd Class with swords (1918)
- Commander 1st Class of the Order of the White Rose of Finland
- (Nazi Germany) Order of the German Eagle with Star
- (Denmark) Commander 2nd Class of the Order of the Dannebrog (11 May 1928)
- (Norway) Commander of the Order of St. Olav
- (Poland) Commander 2nd Class of the Order of Polonia Restituta
- Officer of the Order of the Crown of Italy (1923)
- (Grand Duchy of Baden) Knight 2nd Class of the Order of the Zähringer Lion with oak leafs (1909)
- (Greece) Knight of the Order of George I (1921)
- (Italy) Knight of the Order of Saints Maurice and Lazarus (1921)
- (France) Officer of the de l'Instruction Publique (1911)

== Honours ==
- Member of the Royal Swedish Academy of War Sciences (1931)

Military offices
Preceded by Carl Erik Knös	Life Regiment Hussars; 1935–1937	Succeeded by Knut Henrik Palmstierna
Preceded by Archibald Douglas	Life Regiment of Horse; 1937–1940	Succeeded by Carl-Axel Torén
Preceded by Göran Gyllenstierna	Inspector of the Cavalry; 1940–1943	Succeeded by Sven Ryman
