= Life Regiment of Horse (1667–1791) =

- Livregementet till häst
- Active: 1667–1791
- Country: Sweden
- Allegiance: Swedish Armed Forces
- Branch: Swedish Army
- Type: Cavalry
- Size: Regiment
- Garrison/HQ: Utnäslöt
- Anniversaries: 4 December (Note: Anniversary of the Battle of Lund in 1676.)
- Battle honours: Lützen (1632), Oldendorf (1633), Wittstock (1636), Leipzig (1642), Warsaw (1656), Fredriksodde (1657), March Across the Belts (1658), Halmstad (1676), Lund (1676), Landskrona (1677), Düna (1701), Kliszow (1702), Pultusk (1703), Holowczyn (1708), Helsingborg (1710)

Life Regiment of Horse (Swedish: Livregementet till häst) was a Swedish cavalry regiment and one of the Swedish Army's most distinguished regiments during the early modern period. Formed in the 1620s from cavalry units from Uppland, Västmanland, Närke, and Värmland, it was initially known as the Uppland Horsemen or Uppland Regiment before receiving its later name in 1667.

Under the Swedish allotment system, the regiment was recruited primarily from the eastern provinces of Svealand and was generally larger than other regiments. Its organization was formally established in 1687, when it consisted of 12 companies and around 1,505 men. Its recruitment area was later extended into Västergötland.

The regiment participated in Sweden's wars during the period and was particularly distinguished for its actions at the Battle of Lund in 1676. In 1791, it was reorganized as the Life Regiment Brigade, which was divided into three corps: the Life Regiment Dragoon Corps, Life Regiment Hussar Corps, and Life Regiment Grenadier Corps.

== History ==
The Life Regiment of Horse was one of the most distinguished regiments in the Swedish Army during earlier times and the foremost of the cavalry regiments organized under the allotment system. It was also known as the King's Life Regiment (Konungens livregemente), or simply the Life Regiment (Livregementet). The regiment was formed as early as the 1620s, when the cavalrymen from Uppland and Västmanland, Närke, and Värmland were brought together into a single regiment. Its organization became more firmly established from 1636 onward. At that time, the regiment was known as the Uppland Horsemen or Uppland Regiment, but in 1667 its name was changed to the Life Regiment of Horse.

During the periods of both the older and younger allotment systems, the regiment was recruited from the four eastern provinces of Svealand and was generally stronger than other regiments. Its allotment organization was established in 1687, when the regiment consisted of 12 companies and approximately 1,505 men. Its recruitment area was later extended as far as Västergötland. The companies were subsequently referred to as squadrons.

The Life Regiment of Horse distinguished itself in all of Sweden's wars during this period. The regiment was particularly distinguished for its actions at the Battle of Lund in 1676.

In 1791, the regiment was renamed the Life Regiment Brigade (Livregementsbrigaden) and was reorganized into three corps. Following further changes in designation, these became known as the Life Regiment Dragoon Corps, the Life Regiment Hussar Corps, and the Life Regiment Grenadier Corps.

== Commanders ==
- 1667–1672: Otto Wilhelm Königsmarck
- 1672–1673: Gustaf Adolf De la Gardie
- 1673–1679: Nils Bielke
- 1679–1680: Henric Naschert
- 1680–1688: Hans Ramsvärd
- 1688–1693: Fromhold Fägerskiöld
- 1693–1704: Jakob Spens
- 1704–1709: Carl Gustaf Creutz
- 1709–1715: Lage Meijendorff von Yxkull (acting)
- 1715–1717: Jakob Danckwardt-Lillieström (acting)
- 1717–1722: Anders Koskull
- 1722–1728: Carl Gustaf Creutz
- 1728–1737: Göran Silfverhielm
- 1737–1745: Axel Spens
- 1745–1762: Mattias Alexander von Ungern-Sternberg
- 1762–1774: Pontus Fredrik De la Gardie
- 1774–1780: Fredric Horn
- 1780–1791: Duke of Södermanland

== See also ==
- Life Regiment of Horse (1928–1949)
- List of Swedish cavalry regiments
