= Life Regiment of Horse (1928–1949) =

- Livregementet till häst
- Active: 1928–1949
- Country: Sweden
- Allegiance: Swedish Armed Forces
- Branch: Swedish Army
- Type: Cavalry
- Size: Regiment
- Part of: Eastern Army Division (1928–1936); IV Army Division (1937–1942); IV Military District (1942–1949)
- Garrison/HQ: Stockholm
- Colors: White and blue
- March: "Dragonerna komma" (Ericson) (Note: The marsch was inherited from the Life Regiment Dragoons.)
- Anniversaries: 4 December (Note: Anniversary of the Battle of Lund in 1676.)
- Battle honours: Lützen (1632), Oldendorf (1633), Wittstock (1636), Leipzig (1642), Warsaw (1656), Fredriksodde (1657), March Across the Belts (1658), Lund (1676), Landskrona (1677), Düna (1701), Kliszow (1702), Pultusk (1703), Holowczyn (1708), Helsingborg (1710), Svensksund (1790)

Life Regiment of Horse (Swedish: Livregementet till häst, K 1) was a Swedish Army cavalry unit based in Stockholm. It was formed in 1928 through a merger of the Life Guards of Horse and the Life Regiment Dragoons. The unit was disbanded in 1949 and was amalgamated into the Life Guards Squadron.

== History ==
The Royal Life Regiment of Horse was formed in 1928 through a merger of the Life Guards of Horse and the Life Regiment Dragoons in accordance with the Defence Act of 1925. The newly formed regiment was organized with a regimental staff and four squadrons and was stationed at the Life Guards of Horse' barracks at Sturevägen (present-day Lidingövägen) in Stockholm.

Prior to the Defence Act of 1948, the 1945 Defence Committee proposed that the army be reduced by two cavalry regiments, including the Life Regiment of Horse. However, the Swedish government's proposal to the Riksdag contained only one cavalry regiment that was proposed to be disbanded, the Life Regiment of Horse, and replaced by a mobilization center. That the Life Regiment of Horse was proposed to be disbanded was that the Defence Committee considered that the regiment had poor training opportunities through long distances to suitable training terrain. The regiment's executive officer, however, considered that it entailed extraordinarily valuable marching habit and march training for the regiment. The Riksdag adopted the government's proposal that the regiment should be disbanded, however, no date was set for when the regiment would be disbanded. It was a decision that was postponed pending a new inquiry, depending on where the mobilization center was to be located, Stockholm or at the Swedish Army Riding and Horse-Driving School in Strömsholm. If the mobilization center was relocated to Strömsholm, the Riding School's training squad would also be expanded to a reduced squadron. In Stockholm, a squadron from the Life Regiment of Horse would be retained. Furthermore, the inquiry would also propose alternatives to what the establishment that the Life Regiment of Horse would be used for.

At the Riksdag of 1949, the government proposed to the Riksdag that the squadron that would be located either in Stockholm or Strömsholm, would be located in Stockholm and named the Life Guards Squadron. A military band from the Life Regiment of Horse would also be assigned to the squadron. Furthermore, the Riksdag decided, following the government's proposal, that the Life Regiment of Horse would be disbanded in three stages. On 31 March 1949, the first phase-out period would have ended, when the regiment's pedigree population would also have been phased out. Of the age group that would begin their conscription training in 1949, only 75 men would be called up for training at the squadron, which would later form the Life Guards Squadron. The second stage of the decommissioning was to take place from 1 April to 30 September 1949, with the Life Guards Squadron and Stockholm Staff Company being part of the Life Regiment of Horse. On 1 July 1949, the barracks administration was handed over to the IV Military District Staff. From 1 October 1949, the regiment functioned entirely as a decommissioning organization until 1 July 1950, when the only thing left of the regiment was the Life Guards Squadron with affiliated military band and the Riding School's mobilization center.

== Locations and training areas ==
=== Barracks ===
The Life Regiment on Horse was placed in the barracks previously managed by the Life Guards of Horse. The barracks were built in 1897, and were built according to the 1892 army order's building program, and designed by Erik Josephson. When the regiment was disbanded in 1949, the barracks area was taken over by the Life Guards Squadron (K 1), which via the Life Guard Dragoons (K 1) were based in the area until 30 June 2000. The establishment was also used for the staff of the IV Military District, the Commandant Staff in Stockholm, the Riding School's Mobilization Center (Ridskolans mobiliseringscentral), the Stockholm Staff Company (Stockholms stabskompani), voluntary defense organizations, the army command's pedigree group and storage activities. Since 1 July 2000, parts of the Life Guards have been located in parts of the barracks area.

=== Training areas ===
The regiment trained at Norra Djurgården, Järvafältet and later at Kungsängen.

=== Detachment ===
On 1 October 1938, a cavalry squadron (K 4 B) from Norrland Dragoon Regiment (K 4) was added, which was detached to Boden Garrison.

== Heraldry and traditions ==
=== Anniversary ===
The regiment's anniversary was 4 December, commemorating the Battle of Lund on 4 December 1676.

=== Colours, standards and guidons ===
In connection with the formation of the Life Regiment of Horse on 1 January 1928, the regiment was presented with a new colour, which was handed over by His Majesty the King Gustaf V on 16 June 1928. Furthermore, the regiment continued the traditions of the Life Guards of Horse (K 1) and the Life Regiment Dragoons (K 2).

== Commanding officers ==
From the army roll it appeared that the "King himself has graciously assumed the command of the Life Regiment of Horse". Thus king Gustaf V was the only regimental commander. In the king's absence, however, the regiment was commanded by an executive officer.

=== Executive officers ===
- 1928–1930: Göran Gyllenstierna af Lundholm
- 1930–1935: Rickman von der Lancken
- 1935–1937: Archibald Douglas
- 1937–1940: Henry Peyron
- 1940–1947: Carl-Axel Torén
- 1947–1949: Carl Henrik Wrede af Elimä

== Names, designations and locations ==
Name	Translation	From		To
Kungl. Livregementet till häst	Royal Life Regiment of Horse	1928-01-01	–	1949-09-30
Avvecklingsorganisation	Decommissioning Organisation	1949-10-01	–	1950-06-30
Designation		From		To
K 1		1928-01-01	–	1949-09-30
Location		From		To
Stockholm Garrison		1928-01-01	–	1950-06-30

== See also ==
- Life Guards
- Life Guard Dragoons
- Life Regiment of Horse (1667–1791)
- List of Swedish cavalry regiments
