= Göran Silfverhielm =

Swedish Field marshal

Baron Göran Silfverhielm
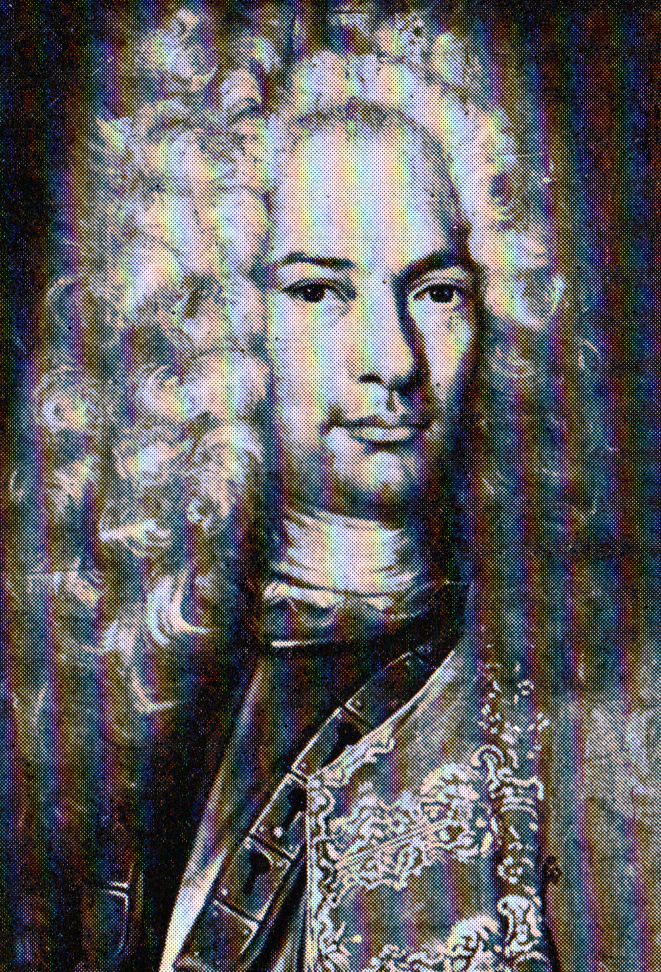
- Göran Silfverhielm
- Born: 1681; Småland
- Died: 1737 (Aged 55 or 56); Vetlanda
- Military career
- Allegiance: Sweden
- Rank: Field Marshal
- Commands: Life Regiment of Horse
- Conflicts: Great Northern War; Battle of Narva; Crossing of the Düna; Battle of Kliszów; Battle of Pułtusk; Storming of Lemberg; Attack on Staritzanderova; Skirmish at Bender; Siege of Stralsund (POW); Charles XII's second Norwegian campaign; Siege of Fredriksten

Göran Silfverhielm (1681 – 7 January 1737) was a Swedish Field Marshal.

Silfverhielm was born in Småland. He was conferred the dignity of Baron in 1725, and was promoted to Field Marshal in 1734. Silfverhielm was married to Hedvig Ulrika Ekeblad, daughter of the wealthy and influential governor Claes Ekeblad Elder. He is buried in Nasby Church, Vetlanda municipality.

He was one of the officers who followed Charles XII of Sweden at Bender after the disaster at Poltava and Perevolochna.

== Career ==
In 1696, he volunteered for the Life Guard and 1700 joined Charles XII's Drabant Corps, where he was referred to as a "brave, courageous, tall, strong, and handsome young man". He participated in the battle of Narva, the Swedish crossing of the Düna, and the battles of Kliszów and Pułtusk, the last of which he captured a Saxon Lieutenant General.

In the storming of Lemberg in 1704, he captured the governor Franciszek Gałecki. After thestorming, he was appointed as Rittmaster and in 1706 became Överstelöjtnant of the Southern Scanian cavalry regiment. On March 3, 1709, he attacked the city of Staritzanderova with 600 men and repulsed the 6,000 Cossack's stationed there, capturing the city and using it to protect Charles XII's flanks after the siege of Veprik.

During the battle of Poltava, he was stationed at the villages of Stokolkow and Kobilak, and later helped Charles XII cross over the Dnepr and then into the Ottoman Empire after the Swedish defeat. During Charles' stay in the Ottoman Empire, more specifically in Bender (modern-day Transnistria), Silfverhielm was in charge of his safety, participating in the skirmish there and Grothusen's embassy to Istanbul in 1714.

He later followed Charles during his return to Sweden, participating in the siege of Stralsund where he was captured and later released. In 1717, he was promoted to Generalmajor and participated in Charles' second Norwegian campaign as the commander of the Life Guard. When Charles was killed during the siege of Fredriksten, he initially opposed Ulrika Elonoras succession to the throne but soon became the first commander of a regiment to recognize it.

As a reward, Silfverhielm was given a portion of the Swedish war treasury and became Lieutenant General and the title of Baron in 1719. He was called for service in the Privy Council of Sweden in 1727 but he chose to remain in the army. In 1734, he was promoted to the rank of Field Marshal.

== See also ==
List of Swedish field marshals

== Works cited ==
- Rosander, Lars [in Swedish] (2003). Sveriges fältmarskalkar: svenska fältherrar från Vasa till Bernadotte [Field Marshals of Sweden: Swedish generals from Vasa to Bernadotte] (in Swedish). Historiska Media. ISBN 9789189442054.
