= Life Regiment Dragoons =

Swedish Army cavalry unit (1791–1927)

- Livregementets dragoner
- Active: 1791–1927
- Country: Sweden
- Allegiance: Swedish Armed Forces
- Branch: Swedish Army
- Type: Cavalry
- Size: Regiment
- Part of: 4th Military District (1833–1893); 4th Army Division (1893–1901); IV Army Division (1902–1927)
- Garrison/HQ: Stockholm
- Colors: White and gold
- March: "Dragonerna komma" (Ericson) (Note: The march was adopted circa 1890 and was taken over by the Life Regiment of Horse in 1928.)
- Anniversaries: 4 December (Battle of Lund 1676)
- Battle honours: Lützen (1632), Lund (1676), Kliszów (1702), Holowczyn (1708)

The Life Regiment Dragoons (Swedish: Livregementets dragoner), designated K 2, was a Swedish Army cavalry regiment that was active in various forms 1791–1927. The unit was based in the Stockholm Garrison in Stockholm and belonged to the King's Life and Household Troops (Kungl. Maj:ts Liv- och Hustrupper) until 1974.

== History ==
The regiment has its origins in the ryttarfanor ("horsemen; cavalry units") which were raised in Uppland, Södermanland, Västmanland, Närke and Värmland. These were combined into two regiments, which, according to the Instrument of Government of 1634, were amalgamated into one. The regiment was from 1636 usually referred to as Upplands ryttare ("Uppland Horsemen"). Its first commanding officer was Isak Axelsson Silversparre. On 26 November 1667, the regiment was upgraded into a royal life squad as a thank you for their efforts during the campaign of Charles X Gustav and received the name Life Regiment of Horse. At the same time, count Otto Wilhelm Königsmarck was appointed regimental commander. The regiment distinguished itself for great bravery in the Battle of Lund in 1676 under Nils Bielke. Charles XI is supposed to have said after the victory: "Next to God I had to thank the brave Nils Bielke and his Life Regiment". In 1680, the regiment was allotted within eastern Svealand. The Life Regiment of Horse was the only regiment in the Stockholm Garrison that was not recruited. In 1785, a special squad of light dragoons was raised in the regiment. It was formed by adding 18 men from each company to the dragoons who formed 4 companies of 36 men in each. This force was increased later and in 1789 during the Russo-Swedish War, they operated as an independent unit of 300 men, 6 companies, under the name Light Dragoon Corps of the Royal Majesty's Life Regiment (Lätta Dragonkåren av Kungl. Maj:ts Livregemente). On 23 February 1791, the regiment was reorganized into a brigade consisting of the Livregementetsbrigadens kyriassiärkår ("Life Regiment Brigade Cuirassier Corps"), which consisted of the companies closest to the capital and which constituted heavy cavalry, the Life Regiment Brigade's Light Dragoon Corps, which consisted of Örebro, Fellingsbro, Östra Närke and Vadsbo companies and the Life Regiment Brigade's light infantry battalion which consisted of the companies in Västmanland and from 1804 also Södermanland's company. In 1815, the brigade was disbanded, and the three constituent units became independent on 16 December 1815. With that change, the Life Regiment Brigade Cuirassier Corps took the name Livregementets dragoner ("Life Regiment Dragoons"). On 31 December 1892, the name Livregementets dragoner ("Life Regiment Dragoons", K 2) was adopted.

In 1816, all Swedish regiments received an order number, where the Life Regiment Dragoons were assigned number 2. In 1914, all order numbers within the Swedish Army were adjusted. The Life Regiment Dragoons was assigned the designation K 2. The adjustment of the designation made it possible to distinguish the regiments between the army branches, but also from their possible reserve and duplication regiments. As a result of the Defence Act of 1925, the regiment was on 1 January 1928 amalgamated with the Life Guards of Horse (K 1) and formed the Life Regiment of Horse (K 1). At the amalgamation, a final parade was held at Ladugårdsgärde in Stockholm. K 1 was dressed in blue parade uniform and K 2 was dressed in gray field uniform m/23. Both regiments marched past His Majesty the King in trot and gallop, after which the veteran regiments did the same on foot. After the parade, the united regiments marched with the united musical bands in the lead to the former barracks of the Life Guards of Horse at Lidingövägen. The squadrons were split so that half consisted of staff and horses from K 1 and half from K 2. The leftover staff and horses were transferred to the respective regiment's disbandment organizations, which ceased in 1931 when the disbandment was completed. The parade uniform became a mixture of the Life Guards of Horse's silver forged uniform, supplemented with the Life Regiment Dragoons's laurel wreath on the helmet and its three crowned crowns on the epaulette's. A new standard was presented by His Majesty the King.

The regiment was disbanded on 31 December 1927, and transferred to a disbandment organization from 1 January 1928. This disbandment organization was dissolved on 31 March 1928. The regiment was on 1 January 1928 amalgamated with the Life Guards of Horse (K 1), and formed the Life Regiment of Horse (K 1).

== Barracks and training areas ==
=== Barracks ===
The regiment trained from 1815 at Polacksbacken in Uppsala and Ladugårdsgärde in Stockholm. From 1881, the corps was placed at Wiksberg at Southern Djurgården in Stockholm, where today Maritime Museum, Swedish National Museum of Science and Technology and the Museum of Ethnography are located. The barracks area consisted of three barracks for the main schools. The three barracks were built in 1881, and became the only ones of their kind that were built according to the pavilion system in one floor. In 1904, the barracks were rebuilt with another floor. After the regiment was disbanded, the Museum of Ethnography moved into the area. In 1976, the three barracks were demolished, to make room for a larger museum building. Of the barracks area only the chancellery building (Chinese Embassy) remains, two stables (Telecom Museum), a cook house and a smithy.

=== Training areas ===
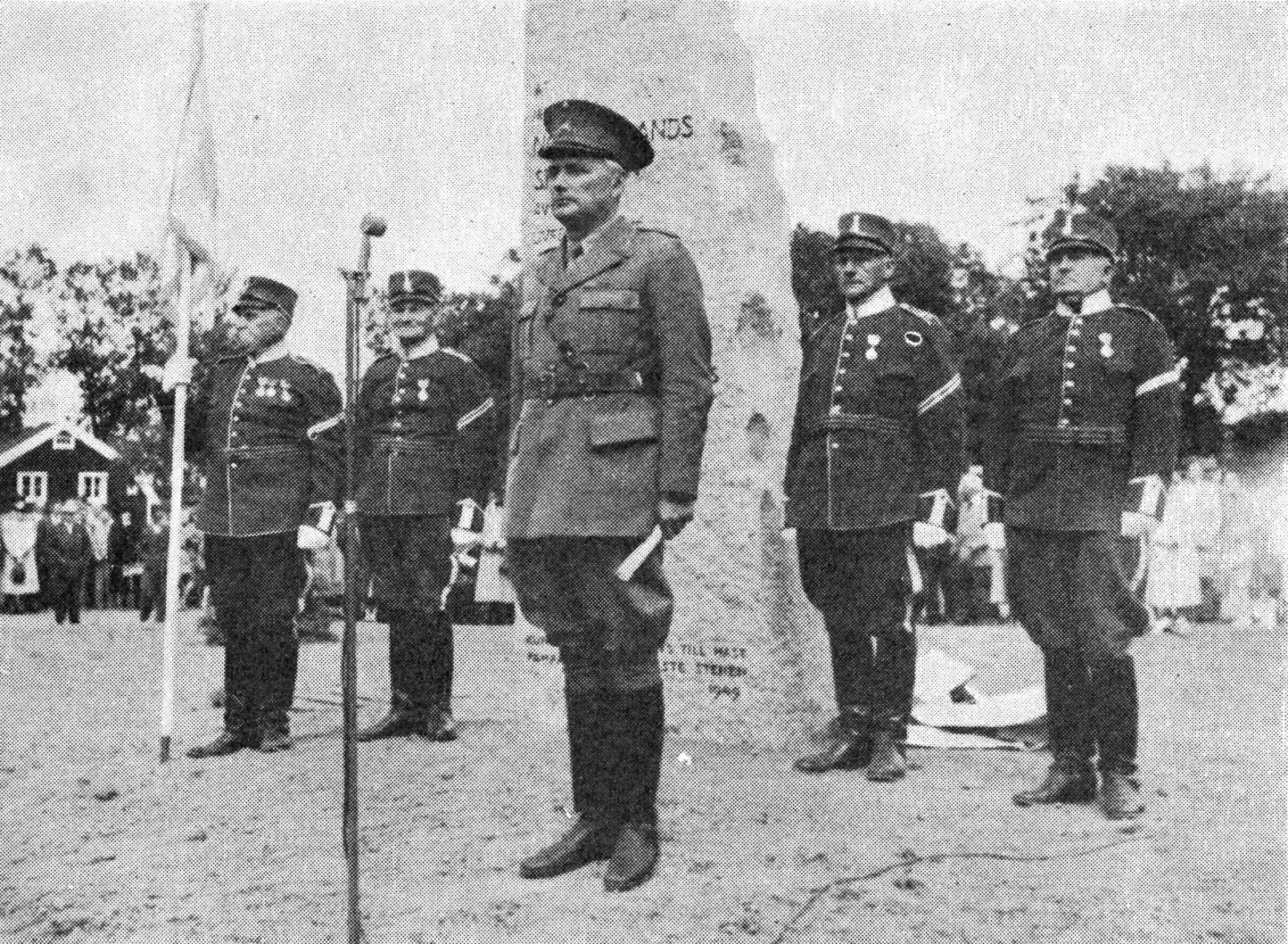
Colonel C. A. Toren (1887–1961) and guard of honour at the unveiling of a memorial stone on 12 June 1949.

The regiment had since 1780 its training field at Utnäslöt about 3 km northeast of Strömsholm Palace. Training fields for the squadrons were (1834):

- Northern Uppland Squadron (Norra Upplands skvadron): Svista in Bälinge socken. A memorial stone was erected at Polacksbacken in Uppsala in 1945: To the memory of Upsala Squadron of the Royal Life Regiment Dragoons. Uppland cavalry has here been trained. The Association of the Royal Life Regiment of Horse erected the stone in 1945. Later, until about 1870, the village of Gamla Uppsala was used as training field. In 1949 a memorial stone was erected here with the text: To the memory of Northern Uppland Squadron of the Royal Life Regiment Dragoons. In the village of Gamla Upsala, the squadron has gathered for departure for weapons exercise and defence of the realm. The Association of the Royal Life Regiment of Horse erected the stone in 1949.
- Uppsala Squadron (Uppsala skvadron): Polacksbacken, Uppsala. A memorial stone was erected here in 1945 with the text: To the memory of Upsala Squadron of the Royal Life Regiment Dragoons. Uppland cavalry has here been trained. The Association of the Royal Life Regiment of Horse erected the stone in 1945.
- Roslag Squadron (Roslags skvadron): Vemblinge in Estuna socken. A memorial stone was erected here in 1932 with the text: Roslag Squadron of the Royal Life Regiment of Horse gathered and trained at Vemblinge during the 17th, 18th and 19th centuries. Roslagens Fornminnes- och hembygdsförening ("Roslagen Ancient Monument and Local Heritage Association") erected the stone in 1932.
- Sigtuna Squadron (Sigtuna skvadron): Bålsta in Yttergrans socken. A memorial stone was erected here in 1931 with the text: Sigtuna Squadron of the Royal Life Regiment of Horse had its training field here until 1908.
- Life Squadron (Livskvadronen): Arenberga in Husby-Ärlinghundra socken. A memorial stone was erected here in 1946 with the inscription The Life company of the Royal Life Regiment of Horse had its training field here during the years 1687-1791. Modern successors and the village erected the stone in 1946.

== Heraldry and traditions ==
The regiment was a sister regiment to the Life Regiment Grenadiers (I 3) and the Life Regiment Hussars (K 3), all of which have their anniversary on 4 December, reminiscent of the Battle of Lund on 4 December 1676. The regimentet held its disbandment ceremony on 11 September 1927. The regiment's traditions were passed on until 1949 by the Life Regiment of Horse (K 1), and from 1949 by the Life Guard Dragoons (K 1). Since 1 July 2000, the memory of the regiment has been cared for by Life Guards (LG).

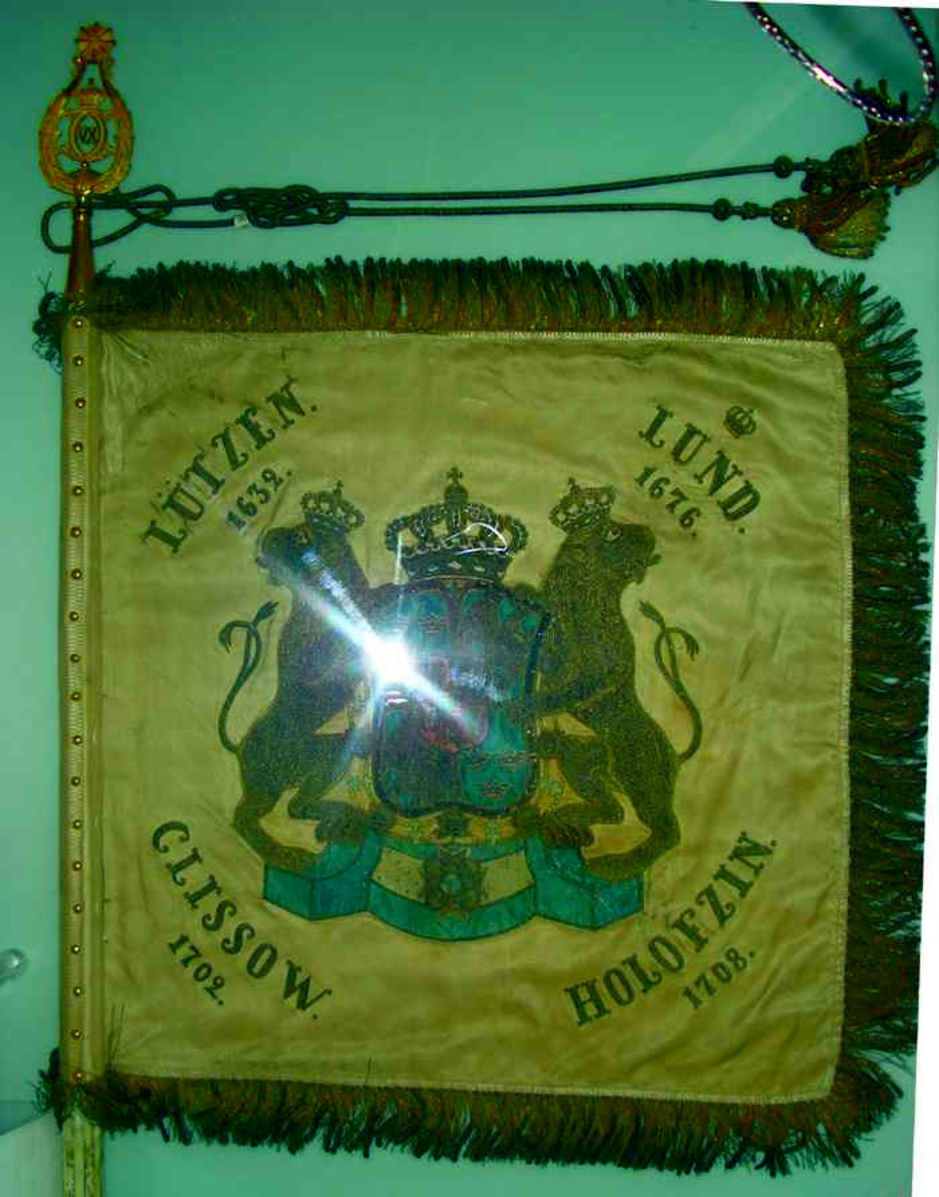
Standard m/1810 of the Life Regiment Dragoon Corps. Embroidered by Queen Lovisa in 1863.

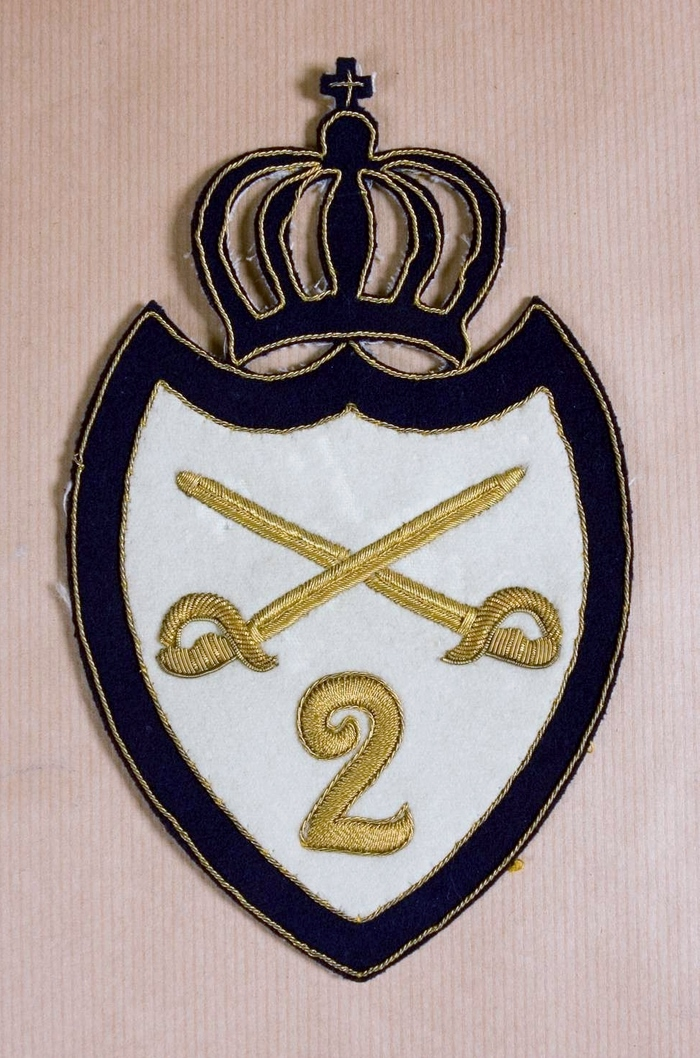
Military patch m/1906

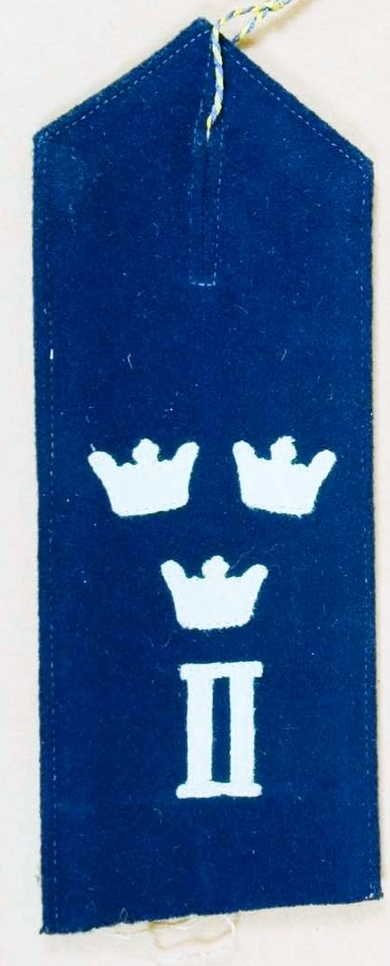
Military patch m/1910

== Commanding officers ==
Regimental commanders and executive officers (Sekundchef) active at the regiment from 1791 to 1927. Sekundchef was a title that was introduced in 1792, after the king took office as regimental commander. The title was used at the regiments that were part of the King's Life and Household Troops (Kungl. Maj:ts Liv- och Hustrupper).

=== Regimental commanders ===
- 1791–1809: Duke Charles of Södermanland
- 1809–1818: Crown Prince Charles John
- 1818–1844: Charles XIV John
- 1844–1859: Oscar I
- 1859–1872: Charles XV
- 1872–1891: Oscar II
- 1891–1907: Oscar II
- 1907–1927: Gustaf V

=== Executive officers ===
- 1792–1796: P Lagerhjelm
- 1796–1808: D Stierncrona
- 1808–1820: Ulric Gyldenstolpe
- 1820–1826: Fredric Burenstam
- 1826–1845: Gustaf Adolph Hierta
- 1845–1856: David L. Silfverstolpe
- 1856–1863: Ludvig af Ugglas
- 1863–1869: Carl Thure af Wirsén
- 1869–1881: C.W. Sandels
- 1881–1887: Georg Christoffer Hjalmar Leijonhielm
- 1887–1902: August Gustaf Fersen Gyldenstolpe
- 1902–1904: Knut Gillis Bildt
- 1904–1915: Carl Rosenblad
- 1915–1921: Gustaf Adolf Boltenstern
- 1921–1927: Göran Gyllenstierna af Lundholm

== Names, designations and locations ==
Name	Translation	From		To
Kungl. Upplands ryttare	Royal Uppland Horsemen	1626	–	1667-11-25
Kungl. Livregementet till häst	Royal Life Regiment of Horse	1667-11-26	–	1791-02-22
Kungl. Livregementetsbrigadens kyriassiärkår	Royal Life Regiment Brigade Cuirassier Corps	1791-02-23	–	1815-12-15
Kungl. Livregementets dragonkår	Royal Life Regiment Dragoons Corps	1815-12-16	–	1892-12-30
Kungl. Livregementets dragoner	Royal Life Regiment Dragoons	1892-12-31	–	1927-12-31
Avvecklingsorganisation	Decommissioning Organisation	1928-01-01	–	1928-03-31
Designation		From		To
№ 2		1816-10-01	–	1914-09-30
K 2		1914-10-01	–	1927-12-31
Location		From		To
Uppsala/Stockholm		1626	–	1881
Stockholm Garrison		1881	–	1927-12-31

== See also ==
- List of Swedish cavalry regiments
