= Life Regiment Hussars =

Swedish Army unit

Coordinates: 58°31′49″N 14°31′42″E

- Livregementets husarer
- Active: 1815 (roots dating back to 1536)
- Country: Sweden
- Allegiance: Swedish Armed Forces
- Branch: Swedish Army
- Type: Cavalry
- Role: Airborne; Air assault Light infantry Reconnaissance
- Size: Regiment (3 active battalions, 2 reserve battalions)
- Part of: Swedish Armed Forces Headquarters (Note: 5th Military District (1833–1847) 4th Military District (1847–1893) 4th Army Division (1893–1901) IV Army Division (1902–1905) III Army Division (1905–1927) Western Army Division (1928–1936) III Army Division (1937–1942) III Military District (1942–1966) Western Military District (1966–1993) Southern Military District (1993–2000) Joint Forces Command (2000–2005))
- Garrison/HQ: Karlsborg
- Motto: Pergite ("Forward") (Note: The motto is derived from the text of a medal that the officers' corps instituted in 1916.)
- Colors: White and blue
- March: "Livregementets husarers marsch" (Hoffman) (Note: The march was adopted around 1890 and was established in 1953 by Army Order 33/1953.)
- Anniversaries: 4 December
- Engagements: Thirty Years' War: Lützen (1632); Wittstock (1636); Second Northern War: Warsaw (1656); Frederiksodde (1657); Bält (1658); Scanian War: Halmstad (1676); Lund (1676); Landskrona (1677); Great Northern War: Düna (1701); Kliszów (1702); Pułtusk (1703); Holowczyn (1708); Poltava (1709); Hälsingborg (1710); Napoleonic Wars: War of the Sixth Coalition; Leipzig (1813); Modern Engagements: Kosovo (1998-2001); Afghanistan (2001-2014); Mali (2012-)

Commanders
- Current commander: COL Björn Andersson

Insignia
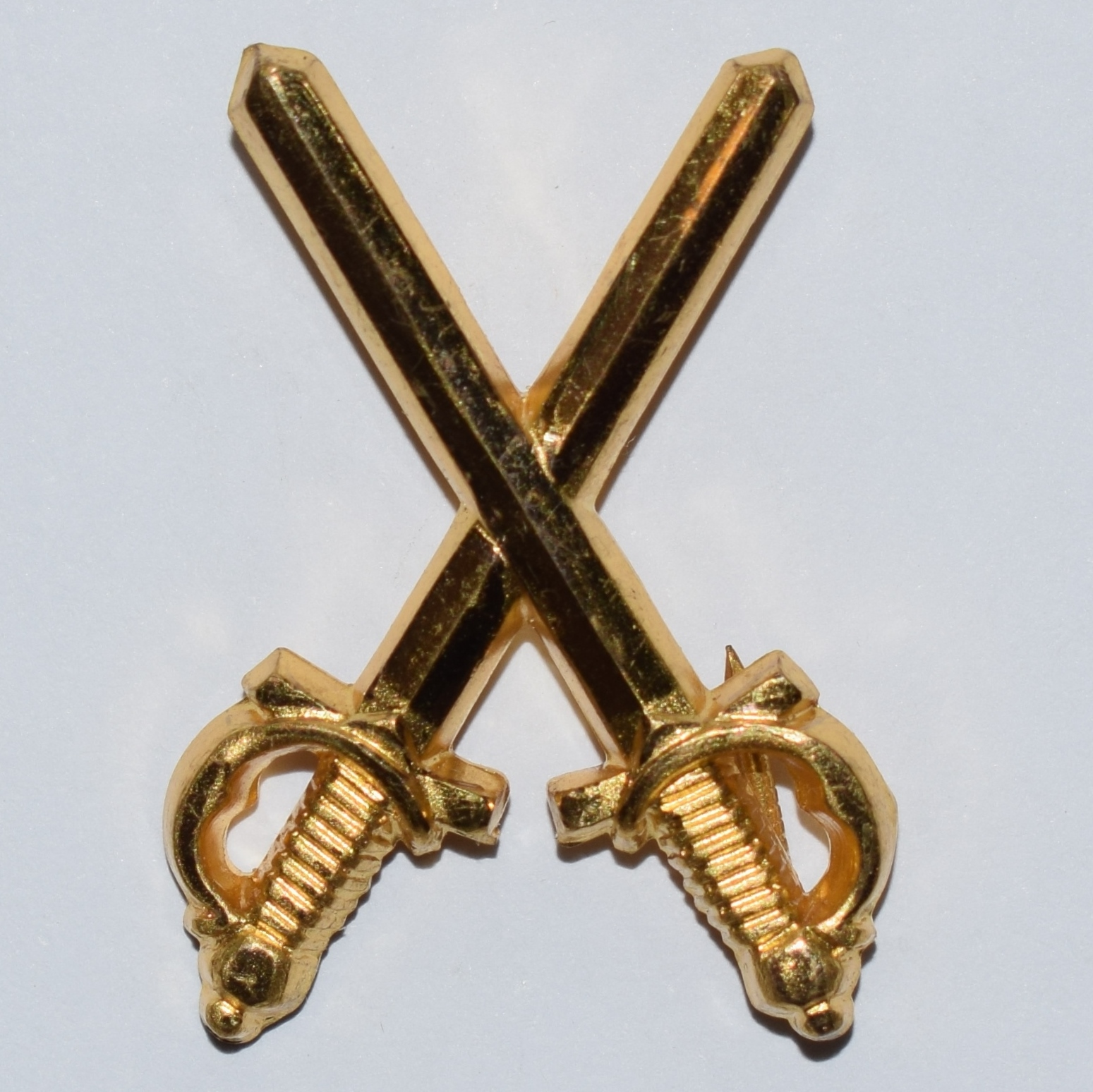
- Branch insignia

- Unit insignia

The Life Regiment Hussars (Swedish: Livregementets husarer; designated K 3) is one of the world's oldest regiments still active. The regiment descends directly from units set up by King Gustav I of Sweden (Gustav Vasa) in 1536, when Sweden set up a draft of horses and men north and south of Stockholm. The regiment was very active in the 1600s and 1700s and helped win several key battles for Sweden on the European continent. Today, the regiment plays a central role in the Swedish Armed Forces and is the most active regiment in Swedish military international engagements.

The regiment has always had light, highly mobile units with substantial strike-power, and also has long history in the area of intelligence. The regiment currently trains an airborne battalion and an intelligence battalion. The airborne battalion is a rapid-response unit with high mobility that enables it to be first on the scene of a mission. The intelligence battalion is able, through the use of advanced technology, to control and guide attacks by aircraft and artillery against a wide range of targets. The regiment is responsible for the operation of UAVs in Sweden.

The regiment is also home to the Swedish Parachute Ranger School, Armed Forces Survival School, Special Operations Group as well as being responsible for Örebro/Värmlands Group which trains part of the Home Guard.

== History ==
The regiment traces its roots to the Arboga meeting in 1536, when King Gustav I of Sweden (Gustav Vasa) set up the units 'The Flag of Uppland (Upplandsfanan)' and 'The Flag of Södermanland (Södermanlandsfanan)'. Sweden had mostly relied on foreign soldiers/mercenaries for any organized, large-scale warfare before this. The new arrangement was based on voluntary farmers who kept horses and, as incentive to sign up, received tax credits. They were supposed to practice on their own, but organized practice essentially never happened. This frustrated king Gustav Vasa, and his son and eventual successor, King Eric XIV of Sweden, who tried to motivate commanders to keep their units ready for war. But this goal remained elusive and the youngest son of Gustav I of Sweden (Gustav Vasa), Charles IX of Sweden, instituted a new rule in 1609, when he was king, that the units had to be inspected and exercised at least monthly by their commanders.

In 1612, when Charles IX of Sweden's son Gustavus Adolphus of Sweden (Gustav II Adolf) had just been appointed king, the two units had about 200 cavalry riders each and were well trained and organized. These cavalry units would become the backbone of the king's successful military tactics, inspired by the new Polish hussars of the effective light-hussar units during the Thirty Years' War and the Polish-Swedish War. In 1626, he reorganized the Swedish Army completely into independent fighting units called squadrons composed of four mounted-rider (Hussar) companies, with 100 riders each, fighting next to infantry units dragoon. The newly named "regiment" units were 'The Riders of Uppland', which recruited from Uppland, Västmanland, and Värmland, and 'The Riders of Södermanland' which recruited from Södermanland and Närke. They had two squadrons each. In the Battle of Lützen (1632), the king himself commanded two of these squadrons, one from each regiment, on the left wing against the Roman Catholic general Wallenstein, where, due to heavy smoke, they became separated from the rest of the army and suffered heavy losses, including the king's life. Sweden still won that battle, and today the name of this battle is included in the regimental flag. These tactics, with cavalry playing the central role of fast flanking manoeuvres on the battlefield, required much more practice than previous styles and Gustavus Adolphus has been called the "father of modern warfare", or the first great modern general.

In 1634, in a major Army reorganization, the two regiments were merged into one regiment called 'The Riders of Uppland' (Upplands ryttare). Commander Field Marshal Sir (Baron) Claes Christersson Horn af Åminne (1587–1651) was leading the Uppland regiment during 1628–1634 and the merger, and his successors were Isak Axelsson Silversparre (1634–1638), Johan Mauritz Wrangel (1639–1657), Pontus Fredric De la Gardie (1658–1664), Eric Planting Gyllenbåga (1664–1667).

On 26 November 1667, the regiment was promoted and renamed to the Life Regiment of Horse in reward for its achievements under King Charles X Gustav's in the Second Northern War by his son Charles XI of Sweden. Count Otto Wilhelm von Königsmark was the commander of the regiment. Under Charles XI of Sweden, the regiment was distinguished for its great courage in the Scanian War and especially the Battle of Lund in 1676 under commander Nils Bielke. After victory, King Charles XI reportedly uttered, "näst Gud hade jag att tacka den tappre Nils Bielke och sitt Livregemente" ("after God I had the brave Nils Bielke and his Life Regiment to thank"). The city of Lund is still mentioned in the regiment's flag, and straw, which was used to identify members of the regiment in the foggy battle, still today decorates the regiment's emblem (the circle around the three crowns). By 1679, the regiment had 12 companies organized into three squadrons and had been continuously engaged in warfare for over 80 years.

Under Charles XII of Sweden, the son of Charles XI of Sweden, the regiment played a central role in the Swedish victories in the Great Northern War. One example is the Battle of Kliszów when the Swedish army of 12,000 men defeated the Polish-Saxon army double its size. In the battle, the right wing, built around the regiment, which had 21 squadrons and 2,100 men and was led by Carl Gustav Rehnskiöld, was surrounded on three sides by the Saxon cavalry of 34 squadrons with 4,250 men. The back line recognized the situation, quickly reverted and switched to attack the flanks of the enemy in a brutal battle which they eventually won. Other battles in the Great Northern War where the regiment played central roles include Crossing of the Düna, Battle of Pułtusk (1703), Battle of Holowczyn, Battle of Poltava and Battle of Helsingborg. All of these city names can be found in the regiment's flag.

The Mounted Life Regiment was the only regiment within the Garrison of Stockholm that was not enlisted. After 1780, the regiment had its exercise field on Utnäs Löt by Strömsholm. In 1785, a special detachment of light dragoons was formed at the regiment. It was formed by adding 18 men from each company to the dragoons, who formed four companies of 36 men each. This force was later enlarged and in 1789 during the Russian War they appeared as a separate unit of 300 men, six companies, under the name The Light Dragoon Corps of his Majesty's Life Regiment.

In 1791, the regiment was reorganized into a brigade consisting of Life Regiment Brigade Cuirassier Corps., which consisted of the companies closest to the capital – heavy cavalry; the Life Regiment Brigade Light Dragoon Corps., which consisted of Örebro, Fellingsbro, Östra Nerike's and Vadsbo companies; and the Life Regiment Brigade Light Infantry Battalion, which consisted of the companies in Västmanland and from 1804 also Södermandland's company.

In 1815, the Life Regiment Light Dragoon Corps. was declared independent and received the name Life Regiment Hussar Corps. The corps was divided primarily into Närke and Northern Västergötland and from 1836 had its office and schools in Örebro. The unit had its meeting place 1815–1836 on Utnös Lut by Strömsholm, and from 1846 on Sanna Hed outside Hallsberg. In 1893, the name was replaced with the present name 'the Life Regiments Hussars'.

In 1905, the regiment moved into barracks in Skövde. From 1942 to 1961, the Signal Detachment of Skövde S1 Sk was located in barracks within K 3 regiment area. In 1955, it was decided to reorganize the Life Regiment Hussars into a battalion and manage it together with Skaraborg Armoured Regiment, P 4. At the battalion, an annual training of 150 motorcycle and bicycle Rangers and about 200 Field Policemen (MP) was planned. The number of horses was reduced from 432 to 15. In connection with the transition from company training to battalion, the Life Regiment Hussars again became a regiment.

The regiment was relocated to Karlsborg Fortress in Karlsborg on 1 July 1984 where it still is located.

== Units ==
=== Current units ===
==== 31st Ranger Battalion ====
The 31st Ranger Battalion is a rapid response unit that uses different means of transport, depending on the nature and possibilities of the assignment. The battalion is characterized by great mobility and being able to move quickly over large distances by helicopters, transport aircraft or own vehicles. The battalion has many different weapons systems, in order to be able to take control of arising combat situations.

==== 32nd Intelligence Battalion ====
The 32nd Intelligence Battalion is Sweden's only unit of its kind. It is characterized by its ability to gather information with a wide range of sensors and analysis of the information gathered. The unit has the ability to move on foot, with off-road vehicles, helicopters or parachutes and can operate on large areas and distances and in the depth of enemy controlled territory.

==== Swedish Armed Forces Survival School ====
The Swedish Armed Forces Survival School (Försvarsmaktens överlevnadsskola, Fös) is a multi-service school with responsibility for developing and training the Swedish Armed Forces personnel in personnel recovery (PR).

=== Former units ===
==== Army Intelligence School ====
The Swedish Army Intelligence School (Arméns underrättelseskola, UndS) was a school unit in the army that operated from 1964 to 1998. In connection with the relocation of the Life Regiment Hussars to Karlsborg Garrison, the Swedish Army Intelligence School became part of the regiment on 1 July 1983. On 1 July 1994, the school was separated from the regiment, and merged with Intelligence Schools of the Swedish Navy and Air Force, forming a new Intelligence and Security Center in Uppsala.

==== Parachute Ranger School ====
The Swedish Parachute Ranger School (FJS) was a unit in the Swedish Army that trained paratroopers. The school was founded in 1952 and located in Karlsborg. The school was administered in the years 1952–1961 by the Karlsborg Anti-Aircraft Regiment (Lv 1), and in the years 1962–1984 by the Göta Signal Regiment (S 2). However, Älvsborg Regiment (I 15) was the so-called troop registration authority for the school's conscripts. In connection with the relocation of the Life Regiment Hussars to Karlsborg, from 1 July 1984 the school became part of the Life Regiment Hussars. The school was disbanded in 2009, and the parts were shared between the Särskilda operationsgruppen and the 32nd Intelligence Battalion.

==== Göta Signal Battalion ====
Göta Signal Battalion (S 2). Prior to the Defence Act of 1982, the Supreme Commander proposed to phase out the Göta Signal Regiment (S 2) by 1984. Instead, most of the regiment's training responsibilities would be placed in Uppland Regiment (S 1). Although the Göta Signal Regiment was to be disbanded, the government considered that there would be capacity and resources in Karlsborg for basic training of a company, as well as for rehearsal training of certain staff and signal units. Upon this change in the basic defence organization, premises were arranged in Karlsborg, which were taken over by the Life Regiment Hussars (K 3), who were relocated to Karlsborg in the summer of 1984. On 30 June 1984, Göta Signal Regiment was disbanded as an independent unit. From 1 July 1984, the unit was amalgamated as a training battalion into the Life Regiment Hussars (K 3). The battalion was disbanded on 31 December 1997. Bataljonen avvecklades den 31 December 1997.

==== Örebro-Värmlandsgruppen ====
Örebro-Värmland Training Group (Örebro-Värmlandsgruppen, ÖVG) is a training group that has been operated since 2000. Through the Defence Act of 2004, the group from 1 January 2006 became part of the Life Regiment Hussars. The group trains and supports the Home Guard in Värmland and Örebro Counties. On 1 January 2020, the group was organizationally transferred to the Western Military Region.

== Heraldry and traditions ==
=== Colours, standards and guidons ===
Life Regiment Hussars presents one regimental standard, one school colour and one traditional colour:

==== Standard of the Life Regiment Hussars ====
The second regimental standard of the Life Regiment Hussars was drawn by Brita Grep and embroidered by hand in insertion technique by Libraria. The standard was presented to the regiment at the then regimental barracks in Skövde by His Majesty the King Gustaf VI Adolf on 14 June 1957. Blazon: "On white cloth in the centre the Swedish Royal coat of arms without mantle as to the law. In each corner three open yellow crowns placed two and one. Battle honours (Lützen 1632, Lund 1676, Wittstock 1636, Landskrona 1677, Leipzig 1642, Düna 1701, Warszawa 1656, Kliszow 1702, Fredriksodde 1657, Holovczyn 1708, Tåget över Bält 1658, Hälsingborg 1710, Halmstad 1676) in yellow horizontally placed above and below the coat of arms. Yellow fringe. A third standard was presented to the regiment in Karlsborg by His Majesty the King Carl XVI Gustaf on 7 March 2022.

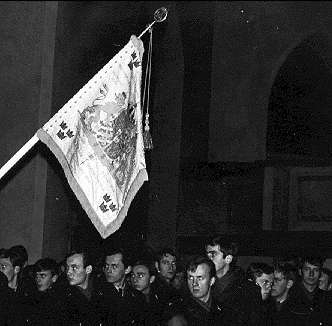
The standard in 1968.

==== Colour of the Swedish Parachute Ranger School ====
The colour of the Swedish Parachute Ranger School is drawn by Ingrid Lamby and Kristina Holmgård-Åkerberg and embroidered by machine in appliqué technique by Engelbrektsson Flag factory. The colour was presented to the then Paratrooper Training Corps (FJS) at the Artillery Yard in Stockholm by the Supreme Commander, general Owe Wiktorin on 30 April 1996. It was used as corps colour by FJS until 1 July 2000. The colour may be used according to the decisions of CO K 3.

==== Colour of the Göta Signal Battalion ====
The traditional colour of S 2 is drawn by Kristina Holmgård-Åkerberg and embroidered by machine in insertion technique by the company Libraria. The colour was presented to the then Göta Signal Battalion (S 2) at the Artillery Yard in Stockholm by the Supreme Commander, general Owe Wiktorin on 30 April 1996. It was used as battalion colour by S 2 until 1 January 1998.

=== Coat of arms ===
The coat of the arms of the Life Regiment Hussars (K 3) since 1977. Blazon: "Azure, the lesser coat of arms of Sweden, three open crowns or, placed two and one. The shield surmounted two rapiers in saltire or and surrounded by a roundel of straw underneath the rapiers and the crown, or."

=== Medals ===
In 2000, the Livregementets husarers (K 3) förtjänstmedalj ("Life Regiment Hussars (K 3) Medal of Merit") in gold and silver (LivreghusGM/SM) of the 8th size was established. The medal ribbon is of white moiré with narrow blue edges and a blue stripe on each side.

=== Other ===
The regimental anniversary is 4 December, as the memory of Battle of Lund on 4 December 1676.

== Commanding officers ==
Executive officers (Sekundchef) and regimental commanders active at the regiment since 1791. Executive officers was a title used until 31 December 1974 at the regiments that belonged to the King's Life and Household Troops (Kungl. Maj:ts Liv- och Hustrupper). In the years 1791–1809 the Crown Prince was the regimental commander. In the years 1818–1974, His Majesty the King was the regimental commander. From 1975 the monarch is the honorary commander of the regiment.

=== Honorary commanders ===
- 1975-20xx: Carl XVI Gustaf

=== Regimental commanders ===
- 1791–1809: Duke Charles of Södermanland
- 1809–1818: Crown Prince Charles John
- 1818–1844: Charles XIV John
- 1844–1859: Oscar I
- 1859–1872: Charles XV
- 1872–1905: Oscar II
- 1907–1950: Gustaf V
- 1950–1973: Gustaf VI Adolf
- 1973–1974: Carl XVI Gustaf
- 1975–1976: Gustaf Malmström
- 1976–1980: Magnus Olson
- 1980–1983: Arne Håkansson
- 1983–1985: Lars Andersson
- 1985–1993: Göran Sjövall
- 1993–1997: Karl Anders Herbert Ingemar Lindberg
- 1997–2002: Claes-Roger Ljunggren
- 2002–2005: Berndt Grundevik
- 2005–2009: Ulf Gunnehed
- 2009–2013: Anders Jerker Löfberg
- 2013–2017: Dag Lidén
- 2017–2022: Ola Barvér
- 2022–2024: Markus Höök
- 2024–20xx: Björn Andersson

=== Executive officers ===
- 1791–1793: N Silfverskiöld
- 1793–1796: D Stierncrona
- 1796–1801: I L Silfversparre
- 1801–1827: J G Aminoff
- 1827–1829: F U von Essen (acting)
- 1829–1855: F U von Essen
- 1855–1862: C H Leuhusen
- 1862–1868: S R Löwen
- 1868–1881: H M A Palmstierna
- 1881–1893: H J Hamilton
- 1893–1904: Carl Wilhelm Herman Leuhusen
- 1904–1913: Gustaf Adolf Nyblaeus
- 1913–1917: Carl Thorsten Gotthard Rudenschöld
- 1917–1922: Adolf Adelswärd
- 1922–1926: Axel Fredric Ahnström
- 1926–1935: Carl Erik Knös
- 1935–1937: Henry Peyron
- 1937–1943: Knut Henrik Palmstierna
- 1943–1945: Åke Hök
- 1945–1951: Gösta Christian Fredrik Bergenstråhle
- 1951–1954: Sven David Oskar Hermelin
- 1954–1955: Per-Hjalmar Bauer
- 1955–1959: Fritz Magnus Sommar Bruzelius
- 1959–1967: Bengt Ljungquist
- 1967–1974: Gustaf Malmström

== Names, designations and locations ==
Name	Translation	From		To
Kungl Livregementets husarkår	Royal Life Regiment Hussar Corps	1815-12-16	–	1892-12-31
Kungl Livregementets husarer	Royal Life Regiment Hussars	1893-01-01	–	1974-12-31
Livregementets husarer	Life Regiment Hussars	1975-01-01	–	
Designation		From		To
No. 3		1893-10-01	–	1914-09-30
K 3		1914-10-01	–	
Locations		From		To
Utnäslöt		1815	–	1836-??-??
Sannahed		1843-??-??	–	1905-10-31
Örebro Garrison		1862-10-07	–	1905-10-31
Skövde Garrison		1905-11-01	–	1984-06-30
Karlsborg Garrison		1984-07-01	–	

== See also ==
- List of Swedish cavalry regiments
