= Battle of Pułtusk (1703) =

Battle of the Great Northern War

Coordinates: 52°43′00″N 21°06′00″E

- Part of the Great Northern War
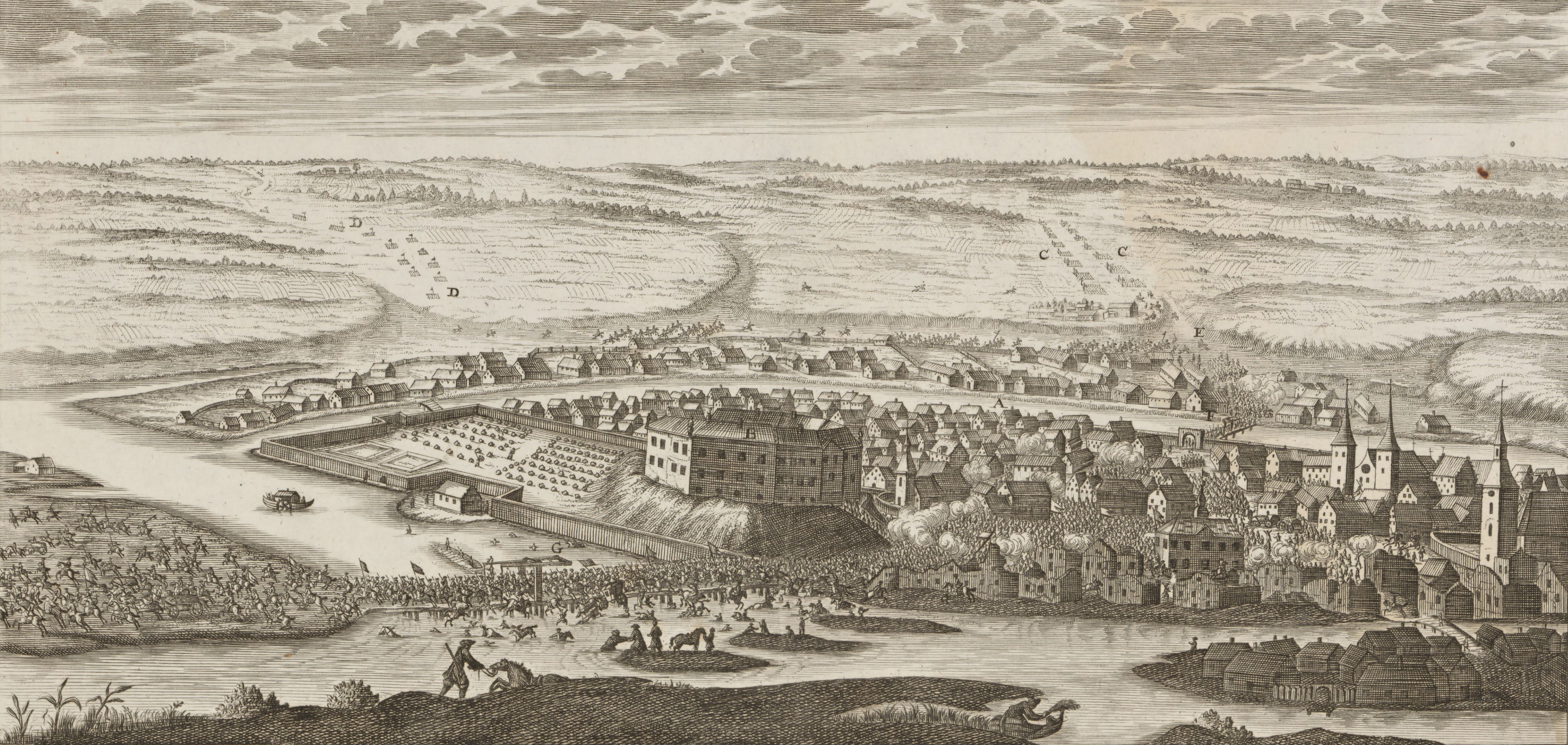
- Battle of Pultusk, 1703. The Swedish army upper left, Saxon army upper right. The final battle at the bridge, low center.
Date	20 April 1703 (O.S.); 21 April 1703 (Swedish calendar); 1 May 1703 (N.S.)
Location	Pułtusk, Poland
Result	Swedish victory

Belligerents
Swedish Empire	Saxony

Commanders and leaders
Charles XII	Adam Heinrich von Steinau

Strength
3,000 cavalry	3,500 cavalry

Casualties and losses
60: 20 killed, 40 wounded	1,300: 500 killed, 800 captured

The Battle of Pułtusk took place on 1 May 1703 (N.S.) in Pułtusk during the Great Northern War. The Swedish army under the command of Charles XII defeated the Saxon army under Adam Heinrich von Steinau.

Charles later went on to take Toruń (Thorn) in December.

== Background ==
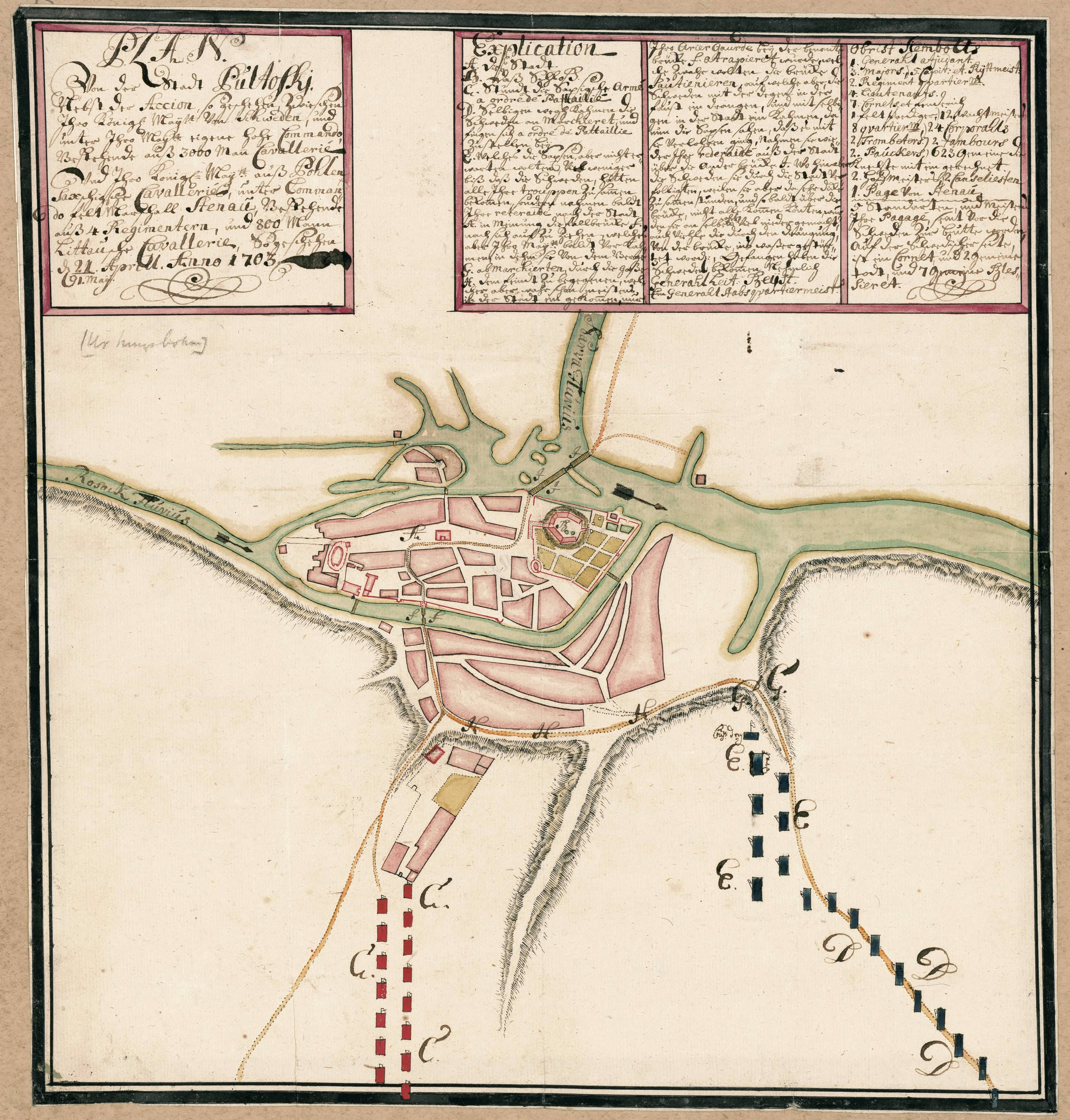
Map of Pułtusk, with army camps

In the first months of 1703 the war in Poland ceased. In March, Charles XII broke with his army in the direction of Warsaw, which he reached at the beginning of April. At the beginning of April 1703 August II left Dresden for Thorn and Marienburg in order to begin the new campaign from there. After the defeat in the previous year in the Battle of Klissow, August II used the time to build a new Saxon-Lithuanian army. This army camped at Pułtusk. Charles XII decided to attack. He rode out of Warsaw with 3,000 cavalry. Because of the many waterways that had to be passed, he left behind infantry and artillery. With the cavalry he crossed the bow and reached Pułtusk on 21 April 1703 (Swedish) / 1 May 1703 (N.S.). At that time the town was only on an island in the Narew.

== Battle ==
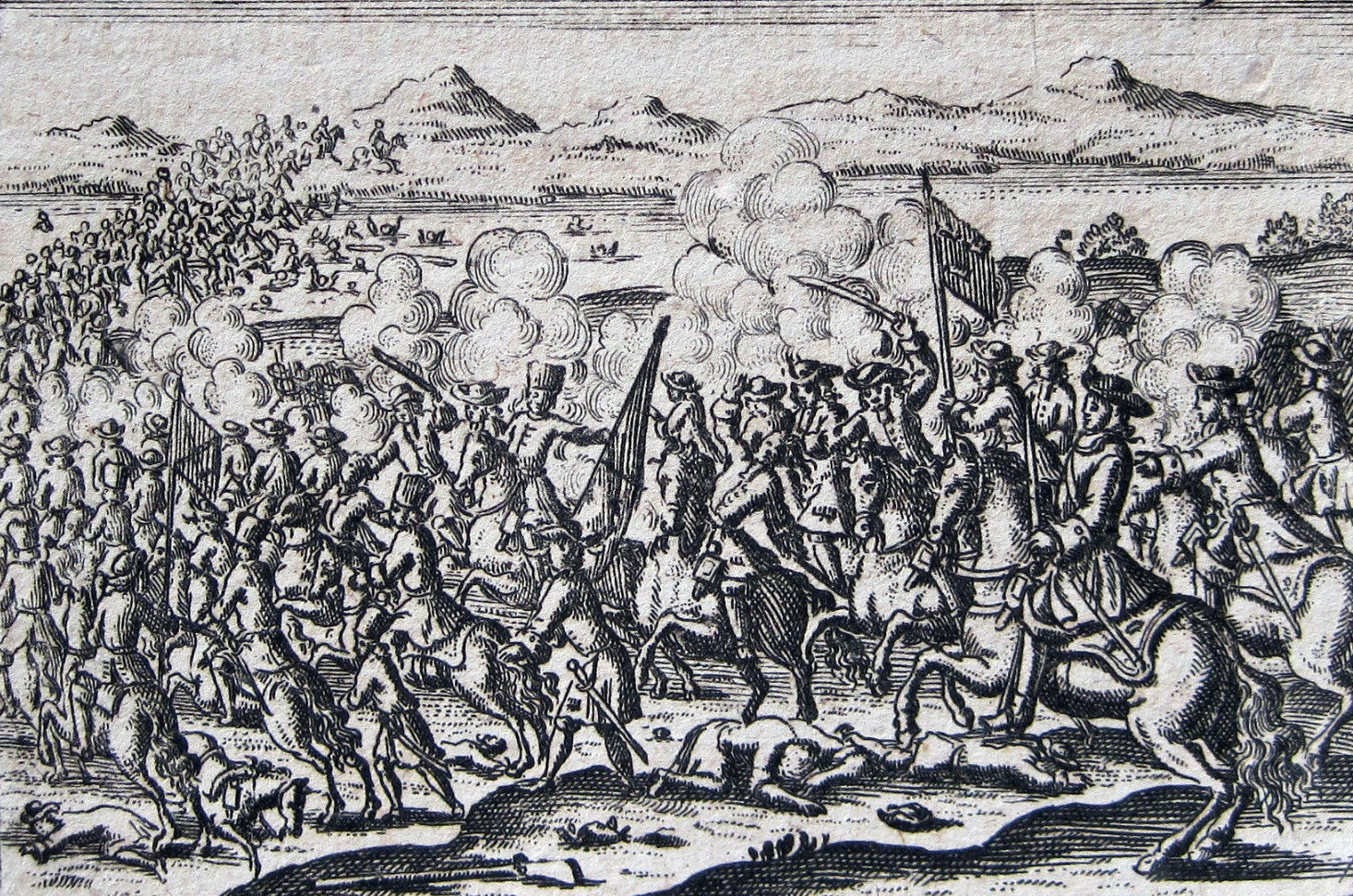
Saxons forces retreating over the river, pursued by the Swedish cavalry

Field Marshal Adam Heinrich von Steinau, who commanded the Saxon army, had no idea of the actual strength of the Swedes and initially only expected a smaller battle. When he saw the entire cavalry, he assumed that the Swedish infantry was also present. He immediately had his troops withdraw to Pułtusk. Charles XII had the retreat route of the Saxons cut off by a dragoon regiment. The Swedish dragoons managed to penetrate the town at the same time as the Saxons, whereupon Charles XII streamed in with the rest of the cavalry. Lithuanians and Saxons fled the town across the bridge of the southern arm of the Narew with almost no resistance. They demolished the bridge too soon to prevent the Swedes from persecuting it. Due to the failure of the only escape route, many Saxons who were still in the town were cut off and were massacred, driven into the river or captured by the attacking Swedes. Soon the southern bridge could be restored so that the pursuit of the fleeing Saxons and Lithuanians could be resumed.

== Result ==
The battle cost the Swedes only forty men, while the Saxons and Lithuanians had several hundred dead and 700 prisoners. Field Marshal Steinau was able to escape while August II was staying in Marienburg, where he was watching a play in which the Saxons defeated the Swedes.
