= Nils Rosenblad =

Swedish Army officer

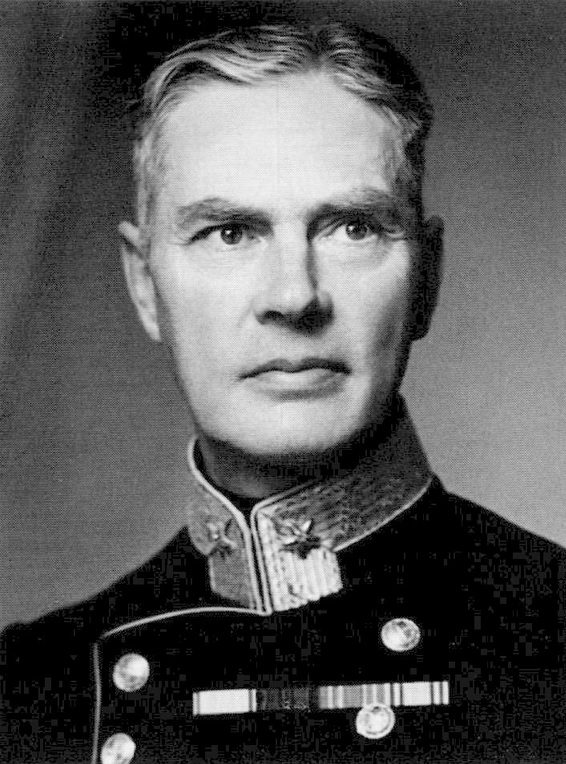
- Rosenblad as major general
- Born: Gustaf Nils Oscar Rosenblad; 1 August 1888; Stockholm, Sweden
- Died: 14 July 1981 (aged 92); Saltsjöbaden, Sweden
- Burial place: Solna Cemetery
- Military career
- Allegiance: Sweden
- Branch: Swedish Army
- Service years: 1908–1946
- Rank: Major general
- Commands: Västerbotten Regiment; 9th Army Division; VI Military District

Major General Gustaf Nils Oscar Rosenblad (1 August 1888 – 14 July 1981) was a senior Swedish Army officer. He served as commander of Västerbotten Regiment (1937–1941), commander of the 9th Army Division (1941), deputy commander of the 3rd Army Division (1941–1942) and then as commanding general of the VI Military District (1942–1946). His career was cut short in 1946 due to the Rosenblad affair. He was transferred to the reserve in 1953 and remained there until 1958.

== Early life ==
Rosenblad was born on 1 August 1888 in Svea Life Guards Parish, Stockholm, Sweden, the son of Major General and Senior Chamberlain (överkammarherren) Carl Rosenblad and Mistress of the State (statsfru) Agnes Charlotta (Lotten) Henrietta Weidenhielm. He passed studentexamen on 18 May 1906 at Högre allmänna läroverket för gossar å Norrmalm in Stockholm.

== Career ==
=== Military career ===
Rosenblad was commissioned as an officer in 1908 and was assigned as a underlöjtnant to the Svea Life Guards in Stockholm the same year where he was promoted to lieutenant in 1910. He received a Candidate of Law degree from Stockholm University College in Stockholm in 1912 and served in the 1st Baden Life Grenadier Regiment (1. Badisches Leib-Grenadier-Regiment) of the Prussian Army in 1913. Rosenblad served at the Swedish Infantry Gunnery School in 1914 and attended the Royal Swedish Army Staff College from 1915 to 1917, and served as a teacher at the Military Academy Karlberg in 1917. He was a member of the Pension Board (Pensionsnämnden) from 1917 to 1924 and served as an officer candidate in the General Staff from 1918 to 1920, and studied law at University of Oxford in 1920. Rosenblad was promoted to captain in 1921 and served in the General Staff in 1923 and as a teacher at the Royal Swedish Army Staff College from 1928 to 1930. He became major in the General Staff in 1929 and served as secretary of the 1929 års försvarsutredning. Rosenblad then served as chief of staff of the Northern Military Command from 1930 to 1933 when he became major in Life Regiment Grenadiers in Örebro. He was promoted to lieutenant colonel in 1934 and served as a military attaché at the Swedish legations in Belgium and France in 1935. Back in Sweden, Rosenblad was promoted to colonel in 1936 and assumed the position of commander of Västerbotten Regiment in 1937, serving until 1941.

Rosenblad was appointed commander of the 9th Army Division (Nionde arméfördelningen) from 1 January 1941, and then assumed the position of deputy commander of the 3rd Army Division on 1 July 1941. He was promoted to major general on 1 July 1942 and served as commanding general of the VI Military District from 1 October 1942. His career was cut short on 1 October 1946 due to the Rosenblad affair in 1946. He was transferred to the reserve on 1 October 1953 where he remained until 1958.

During his career, Rosenblad wrote essays in Krigsvetenskapsakademiens handlingar och tidskrift, Svensk militär tidskrift, Svensk Tidskrift, Det Nya Sverige, Vårt försvar, Effektivt försvar and in the daily press in military law and political subjects. He authored Ett ord i försvarsfrågan (1924).

=== Rosenblad affair ===
The Rosenblad affair was, alongside the extradition of Baltic soldiers, one of 1946's major media scandals in Sweden. At the center of the scandal was Major General Nils Rosenblad, who had owned shares in the pro-Nazi Swedish newspaper Dagsposten, which received financial support from Germany during World War II. In the final stages of the war, Ture Nerman's newspaper Trots allt! published the names of the shareholders. Since Rosenblad had made a one-off contribution in 1941, when the newspaper was published, which gave him shares, his name was also on the list. Because Rosenblad was highly placed in the Swedish military command, he ended up in the eye of the storm, with persistent attacks in articles and petitions. The Communists in particular demanded that he resign. It was not made better by the fact that Rosenblad himself provided conflicting information to both Supreme Commander, General Helge Jung and Defence Minister Allan Vougt. The former was deeply disappointed in Rosenblad, who he believed had lied to him. The Chancellor of Justice Olof Alsén stated that Rosenblad had indeed been careless when it came to the shareholding, but that there was no indication that he would be politically unreliable. Prime Minister Per Albin Hansson defended Rosenblad at length. At a meeting on 8 April 1946, Minister of Education and Ecclesiastical Affairs Tage Erlander pointed out that the major general's forgetfulness regarding the shareholding was incomprehensible, especially as it emerged that he was well aware that the newspaper received subsidies from Germany.

Hansson replied "in a superior tone" (according to Erlander's diaries) that one can very well forget even the most important things. He was upset when Erlander, like Gunnar Sträng, Gustav Möller and others, had a different opinion and wanted to criticize Rosenblad in harsher terms than the prime minister wanted. At the interpellation debate two days later, it went, notes Erlander, "more pleasantly than expected" because Per Albin "put off his superhuman attitude". Both Hansson and Allan Vougt officially supported the Chancellor of Justice's conclusions, but the clock was nevertheless ticking for Rosenblad. General Jung and the Chief of the Army, Lieutenant General Archibald Douglas courted King Gustaf V on the same day with the request that Rosenblad be dismissed, which the king agreed to, however with the proviso that the major general should receive time to act himself. The following day, Rosenblad was informed by Prime Minister Hansson that he should hand in his resignation within a month. When the Supreme Commander and the Chief of the Army also formally asked Vougt to dismiss Rosenblad, he did as requested and left his post. The minister who took the most offense to the affair was Per Edvin Sköld, who believed that Rosenblad had suffered a miscarriage of justice and that the Swedish government had been run over by the communists. What had happened would have been equivalent to "spitting an honorable man (Rosenblad) in the face". "For fuck's sake, for fuck's sake", he added in a heated discussion with Erlander, whereupon he abruptly left the minister Erlander.

Rosenblad was not the only overly pro-German senior officer whom General Jung and the circle around him wanted out of office in the years after World War II. Another was the head of the Military Office of the Minister of Defence, Major General Henry Kellgren. In addition, they wanted to prevent the Supreme Commander, General Olof Thörnell, from leading the compilation of the military preparedness, known as the Beredskapsverket ("Swedish Agency for Military Preparedness"). Unlike Rosenblad, Kellgren received the government's full support, whereby the action went down the drain. Action against Thörnell was also prepared, but his position as Chief of His Majesty's Military Staff made him less accessible. The year after the Rosenblad affair, the Meyerhöffer affair started, where another active officer came in the crosshairs of General Jung's purges of pro-German officers in the Swedish officer corps.

== Later life ==
Rosenblad was deputy chairman of the Directorate of the Swedish Nobility Foundation from 1953 to 1956.

== Personal life ==
On 8 October 1921 in Engelbrekt Parish, Stockholm, Rosenblad married Sonja Francke (8 September 1895 in Engelbrekt Parish, Stockholm – 14 June 1925 där, Svea Life Guards Parish, Stockholm), the daughter of grosshandlaren Otto Francke and Fanny Elisabet Liljewalch.

On 14 October 1930 in Engelbrekt Parish, Stockholm, Rosenblad married his deceased wife's sister, Lott Francke (15 November 1903 in Hedvig Eleonora Parish, Stockholm – 20 May 1993 in Saltsjöbaden). Nils and Lott had five children: Cecilia (born 1931), Mathias (1933–2015), Carl (born 1935), Ebba (born 1939) and Anna (born 1944).

== Death ==
Rosenblad died on 14 July 1981 in Saltsjöbaden, Stockholm County. He was interred in the family grave at Solna Cemetery in Solna Municipality, near Stockholm.

== Dates of rank ==
- 31 December 1908 – Underlöjtnant
- 31 December 1910 – Lieutenant 2nd Class
- 31 December 1915 – Lieutenant 1st Class
- 15 January 1915 – Captain 2nd Class
- 31 December 1929 – Major
- 1 June 1934 – Lieutenant colonel
- 13 November 1936 – Colonel
- 1 July 1942 – Major general

== Awards and decorations ==
=== Swedish ===
- (Sweden) Commander Grand Cross of the Order of the Sword (10 November 1951)
- (Sweden) Knight of the Order of the Polar Star
- (Sweden) Landstormens Silver Medal
- (Sweden) Västerbottens landstormsförbunds Silver Medal

=== Foreign ===
- (Belgium) Commander of the Order of the Crown
- (Tunisia) Commander of the Order of Glory
- (France) Officer of the Legion of Honour
- (Grand Duchy of Baden) Knight of the Order of the Zähringer Lion
- (Portugal) Portuguese Red Cross Medal

== Honours ==
- Member of the Royal Swedish Academy of War Sciences (1941)

== Bibliography ==
- Rosenblad, Nils (1924). Ett ord i försvarsfrågan sommaren 1924 (in Swedish). Stockholm: Svenska folkförbundet. SELIBR 1481183.

Military offices
Preceded by Carl Bennedich	Västerbotten Regiment; 1937–1941	Succeeded by Olof Sjöberg
Preceded by –	VI Military District; 1942–1946	Succeeded by Sven Colliander
