= Adam Heinrich von Steinau =

Saxon noble and soldier (died 1712)

Graf Adam Heinrich von Steinau
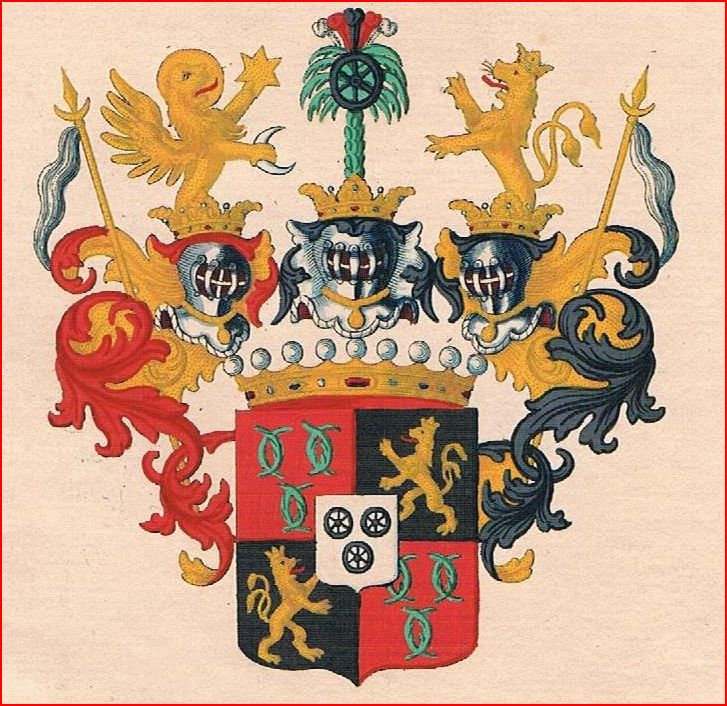
- von Steinau coat of arms
- Died: 1712; Nebillau
- Burial place: Jakobus Church, Prusing
- Military career
- Allegiance: Saxon
- Service years: 13
- Rank: Generalfeldmarschall
- Commands: 3
- Conflicts: War of the Grand Alliance

Adam Heinrich Graf von Steinau (died 1712) was a Saxon Generalfeldmarschall.

Steinau served in the Bavarian contingent in the 1685–1688 campaign in Ottoman Hungary against the Ottoman Empire. He then participated in the War of the Grand Alliance against France under Charles V, Duke of Lorraine and in the successful siege of Mainz in 1689. Later he entered the service of the Republic of Venice in the 1695 war against the Ottoman Empire. In 1695–96 he was in the service of the Saxon elector Frederick August I (Augustus II the Strong, King of Poland) as the commander of the imperial troops in Royal Hungary in the continuous war with the Ottoman Turks.

On 27 August 1699 Steinau was promoted to the rank of the Generalfeldmarschall. With his Saxon troops he participated on behalf of Augustus II the Strong in the Great Northern War defending Livonia in the Courland campaign, and in February – November 1700 the Siege of Riga. In July 1700 he won a battle in Jungfernhof (Jumpravmuiža, Jumprava) near Riga against the young Swedish general Otto Vellingk.

On 9 July 1701 Steinau lost at the Crossing of the Daugava against King Charles XII of Sweden. On 9 July 1702 in Poland he lost the Battle of Kliszów. On 21 April 1703 a decisive battle was fought in Pułtusk, where the Swedish army under Charles XII defeated and captured a large part of the Saxon army under Steinau. After this defeat Steinau time entered the service of Venice for a second time. He regarded service to Venice according to his own statement as "part of his old person".

In 1705 the count purchased Žinkovy, Chlumčany and Nebílovy including Netunice. In 1706 he commissioned construction of the Nebílovy palace to building master Jakob Auguston from Plzeň. After his death in Nebílovy, Steinau was buried on the grounds of the Jakobus Church in Prusiny.

== See also ==
- Great Northern War
- Ottoman Hungary
