= Life Regiment Grenadiers =

- Livregementets grenadjärer
- Active: 1815–2000
- Country: Sweden
- Allegiance: Swedish Armed Forces
- Branch: Swedish Army
- Type: Infantry
- Size: Regiment
- Part of: 5th Military District (1833–1847); 4th Military District (1847–1893); 4th Army Division (1893–1901); IV Army Division (1902–1927); Eastern Army Division (1928–1936); IV Army Division (1937–1942); V Military District (1942–1966); Bergslagen Military District (1966–1991); Middle Military District (1991–2000)
- Garrison/HQ: Örebro
- Motto: Artibus et armis recuperatur gloria (Note: In 1957, the Chief of the Army acknowledged that this motto, originally used by Närke-Värmland Regiment on a colour from 1658, was allowed to be used by the regiment.)
- Colors: Light blue and white
- March: "Livregementets grenadjärers marsch" (Eilhardt) (Note: The march was adopted in 1893 and established in 1953 by Army Order 33/1953. The march was used by the Livregementets grenadjärgrupp from 2000 to 2005, and of the Örebro-Värmlandsgruppen since 2005.)
- Anniversaries: 4 December (Battle of Lund 1676)
- Battle honours: Lützen (1632), Oldendorf (1633), Wittstock (1636), Leipzig (1642), Warsaw (1656), Frederiksodde (1657), Tåget över Bält (1658), Lund (1676), Landskrona (1677), Narva (1700), Düna (1701); Kliszów (1702), Fraustadt (1706), Holowczyn (1708), Malatitze (1708), Hälsingborg (1710), Gadebusch (1712), Svensksund (1790)

Insignia
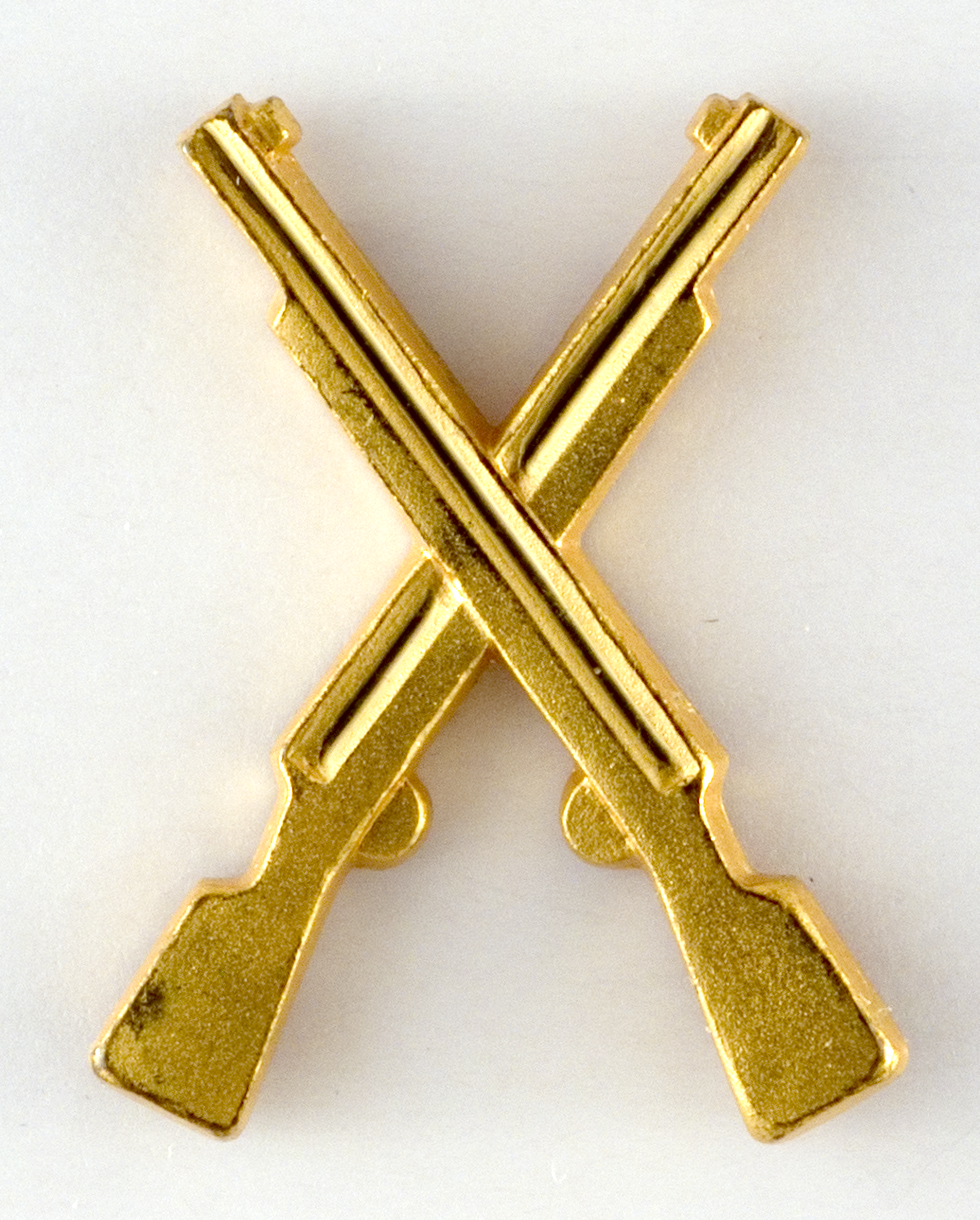
- Branch insignia

- Unit insignia

Life Regiment Grenadiers (Swedish: Livregementets grenadjärer), also I 3, was a Swedish Army infantry unit that was active in various forms 1815–2000. The unit was based in Örebro Garrison in Örebro and belonged to the King's Life and Household Troops (Kungl. Maj:ts Liv- och Hustrupper) until 1974.

== History ==
The unit has its root in the Life Regiment Grenadier Corps (Livregementets grenadjärkår), which at the division of the Life Regiments (in 1791) was called the Life Regiment Brigade's Light Infantry Battalion (Livregementsbrigadens lätta infanteribataljon), but which in 1804 adopted the name Life Regiment Grenadier Corps. Its strength then amounted to foura companies with 500 men, divided into Stockholm County, Södermanland County, Västmanland County and Örebro County. Its training area was located at Utnäs löt, near Strömsholm, and the unit was mainly based in Västerås. In 1893, the corps was amalgamated into the Life Regiment of Foot (Livregementet till fot) which was created a merger of Life Regiment Grenadier Corps and Närke Regiment. On 8 December 1904, the Life Regiment of Foot changed its name to the Life Regiment Grenadiers. Through vacancy, the regiment was set at 1,000 men. It later (1912) received its conscript from Örebro and to some extent from Värmland County. Its training area was Sannahed, near Hallsberg railway station, and the unit was based in Örebro, where it was later relocated.

== Locations and training areas ==
=== Barracks ===
During the period that the regiment had its military camp at Utnäslöt, there was an office in Västerås. When the Life Regiment Grenadier Corps and Närke Regiment were amalgamated in 1893 and formed the Life Regiment of Foot, the greater part of the Life Regiment Grenadier Corps was transferred to Sannahed. From 1 October 1904, the regiment moved its office to Örebro, where it took over the former chancery building of the Life Regiment Hussars. In 1913, the regiment left its military camp at Sannahed and moved into the barracks in Örebro on 2 March. In Örebro, three barracks had been erected in connection with the neighborhood of Rynninge. The barracks were later (1958) named after three of the major victories of the Life Regiment Grenadier Corps and Närke-Värmland Regiment, respectively. Barracks 1 was named after Lund, Barracks 2 was named after Narva and Barracks 3 was named after Kliszów. The barracks along with the chancery building framed a large barracks yard in classic regiment architecture signed Viktor Bodin. Plans were in place to add a fourth barracks and with it form an open square around the barracks yard. The barracks establishment was erected after the 1901 Army Program following the Barracks Building Board's (Kasernbyggnadsnämnden) first series of type drawings. In total, some 80 buildings were erected in the area. In connection with the barracks yard, the Swedish Missionary Society, through the association Soldaternas vänner i Örebro län ("Friends of the Soldiers in Örebro County") erected a so-called soldathem ("soldier's home") on Höglundagatan 2.

After the conscription training ended in the summer of 1992, the barracks yard was divided into an older and a younger section. The older southwest part of the barracks, among other things, was sold to Örebro Municipality. The younger northeast part consisting of, among other things, a hospital building, vehicle area, workshops and storage areas remained as a military area until 1999. Originally it was intended that the regimental staff would be grouped in the former hospital building. However, the staff remained in the chancery building and the Home Guard and volunteer sections of the regiment in their building in the southwest part. These two buildings were leased until the regiment was disbanded. After the Swedish Armed Forces left the northeast area in 2002, the area was developed into the neighborhood of Grenadjärstaden.

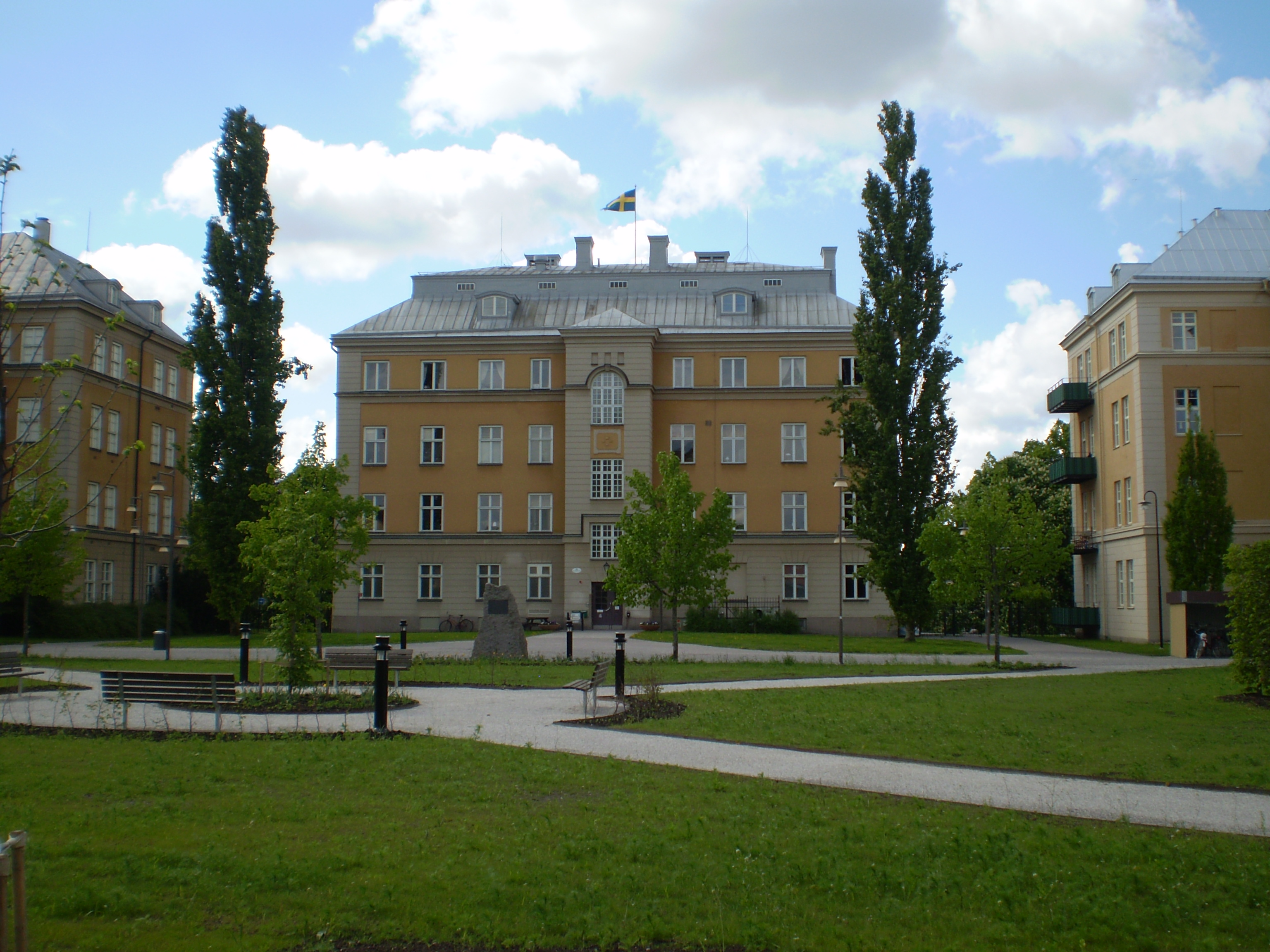
Chancery building

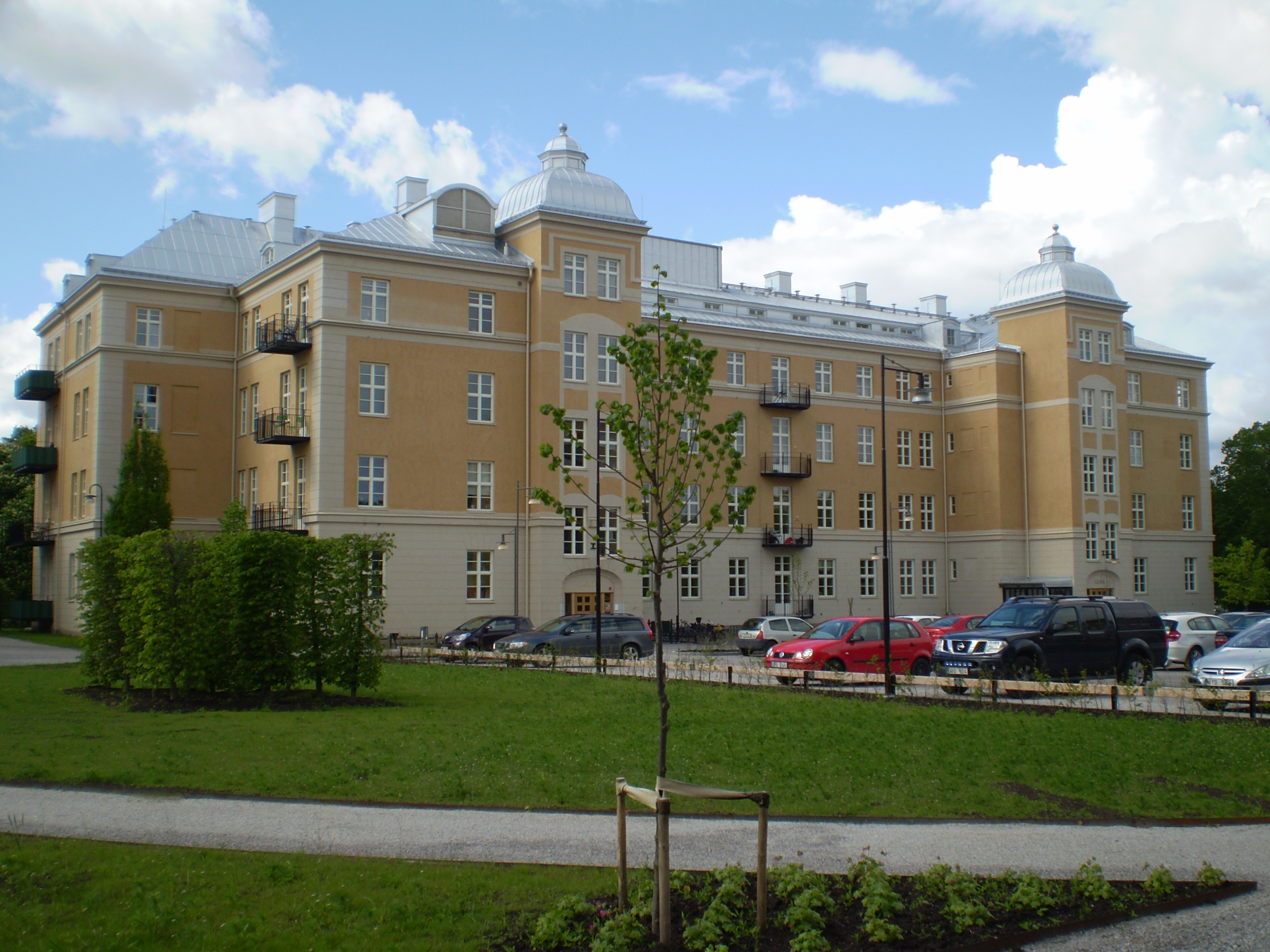
Barracks 1 (Lund)

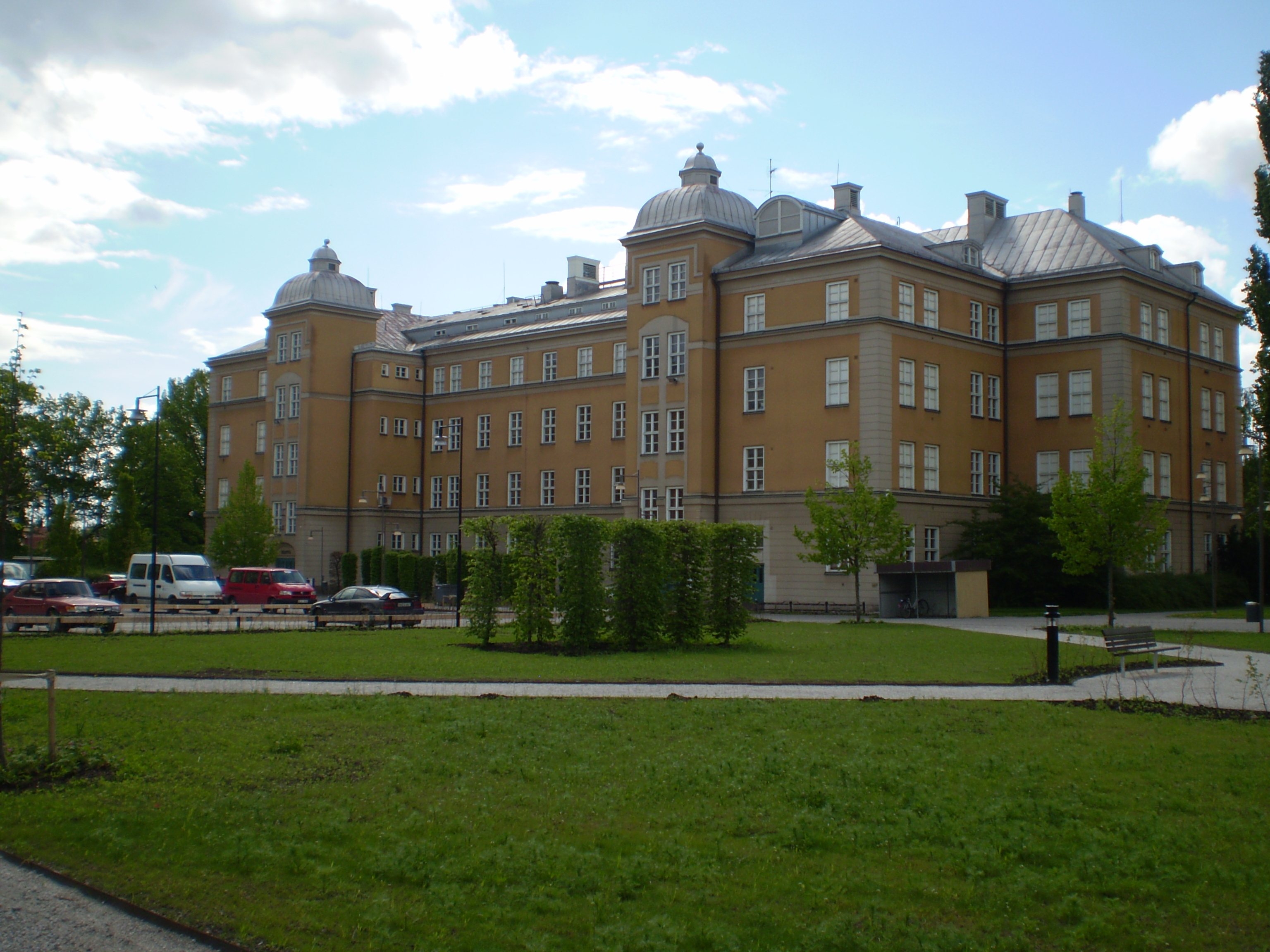
Barracks 2 (Narva)

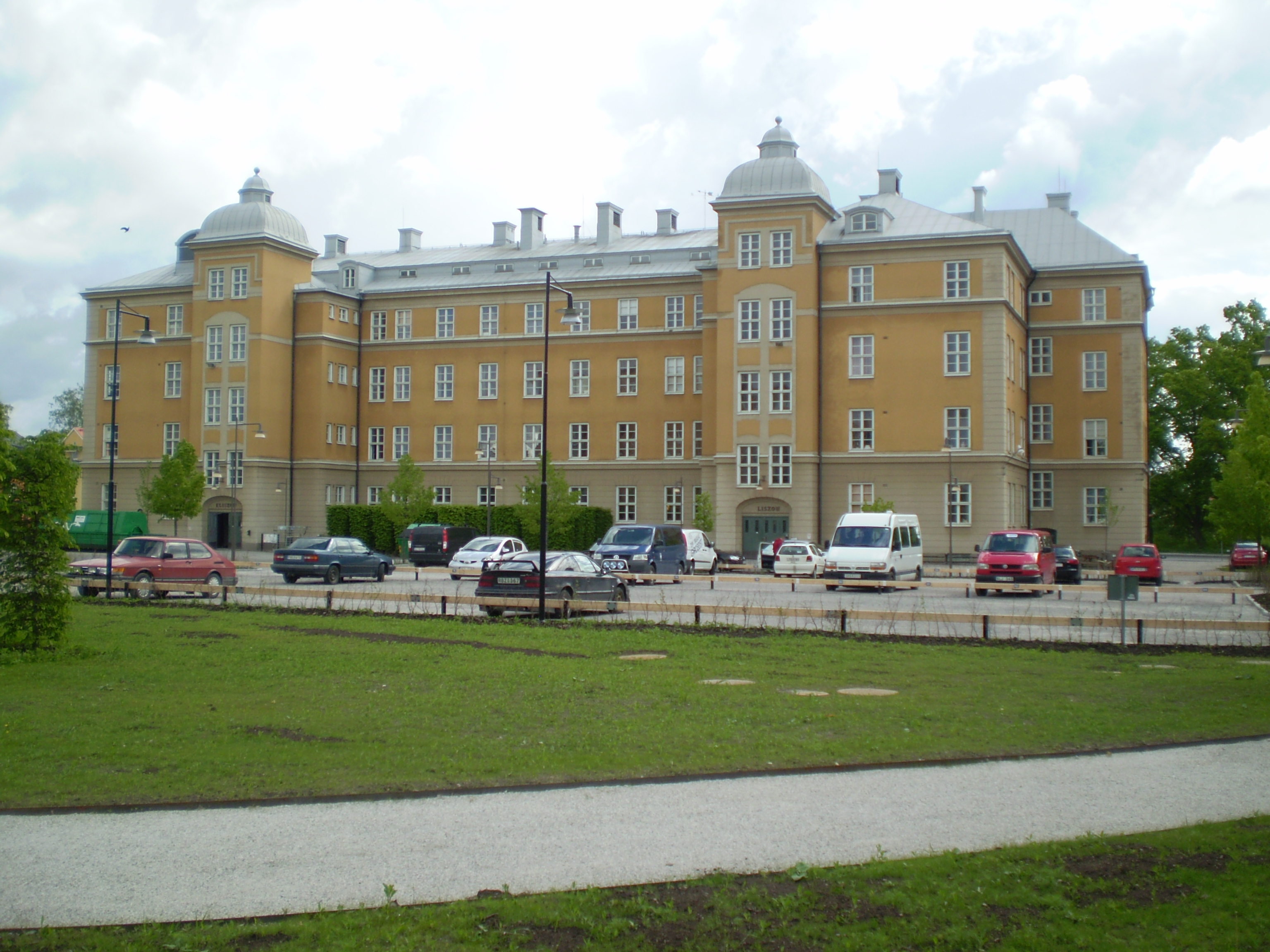
Barracks 3 (Kliszów)

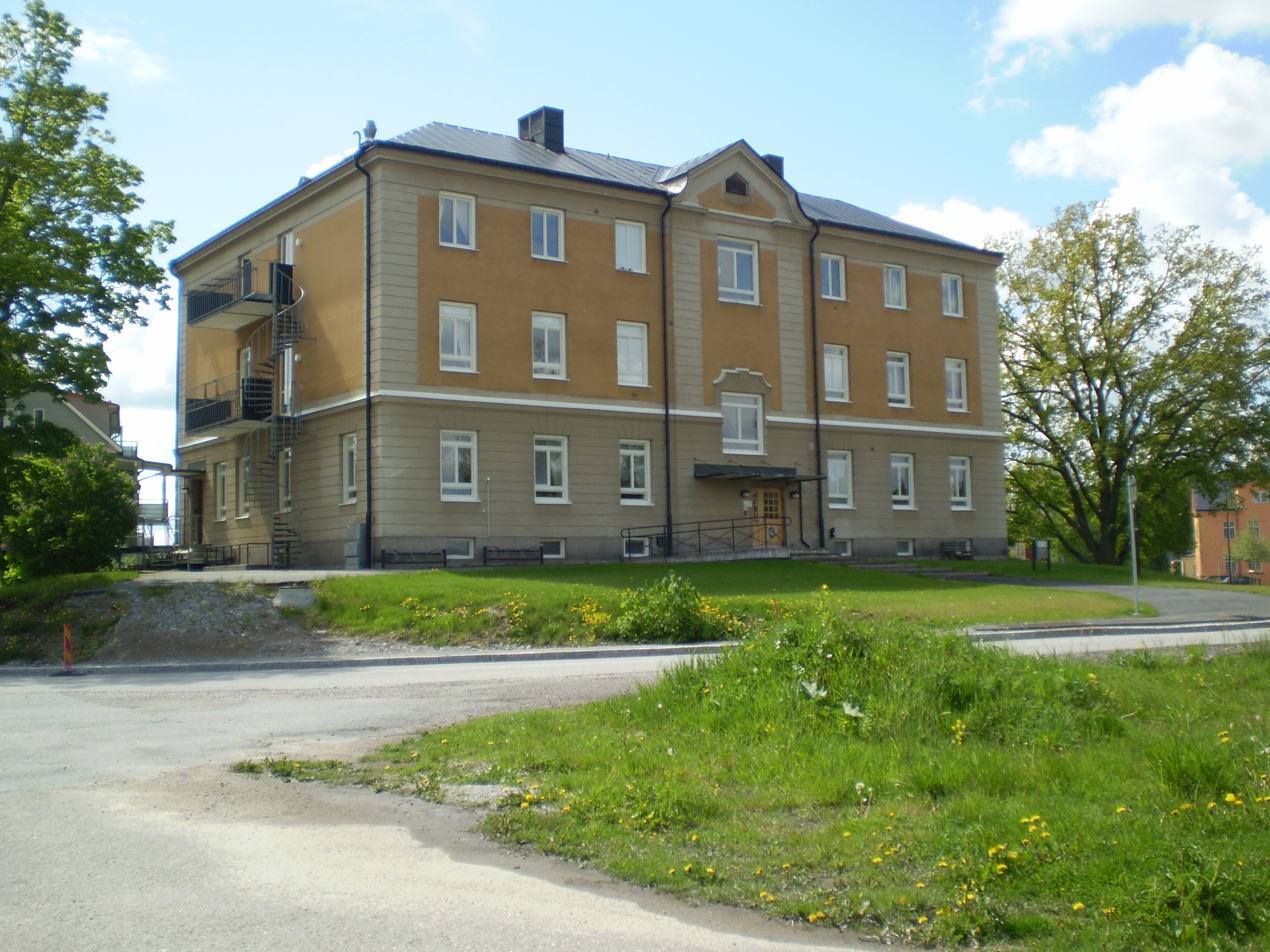
Hospital

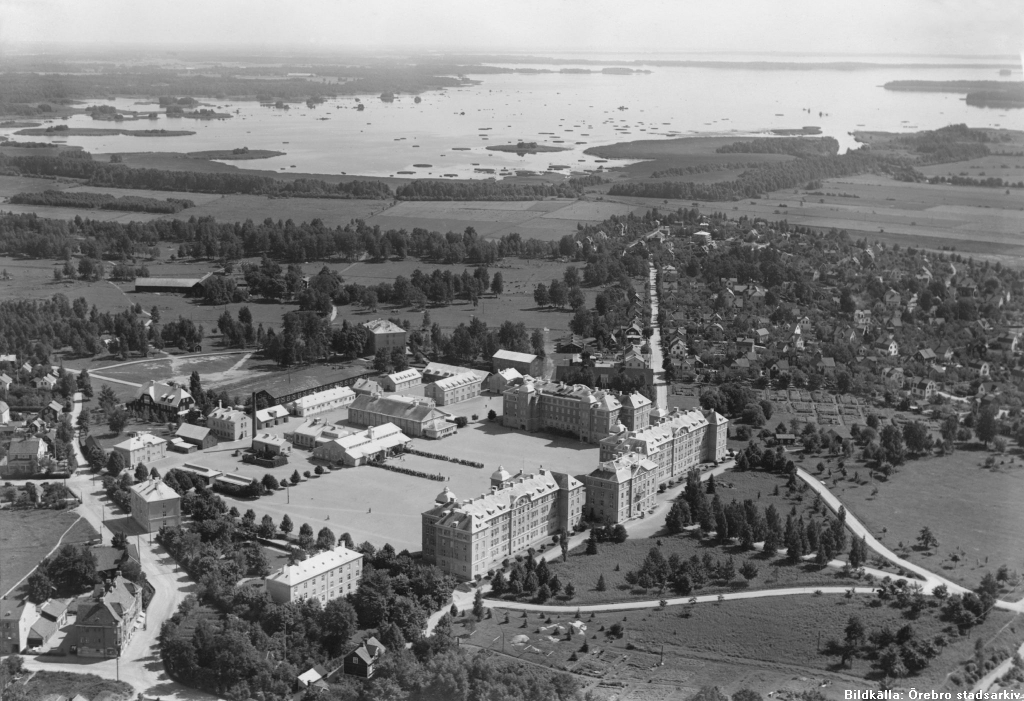
1939 aerial view

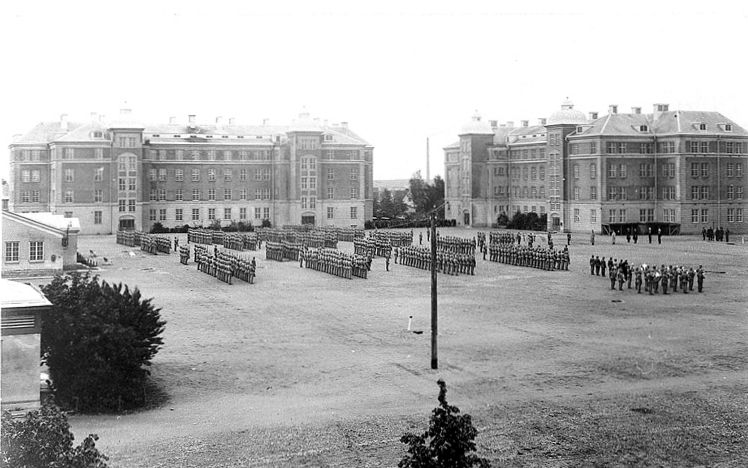
Barracks yard in 1928

=== Training areas ===
When the Life Regiment was divided, the Life Regiment Grenadier Corps from 1780 came to have its military camp and training area at Utnäslöt just over 3 km northeast of Strömsholm Palace. The camp was left in 1894 (the last exercises were held there in 1893), but the place was maintained until 1902 as a remount depot. When the Life Regiment Grenadier Corps and Närke Regiment were amalgamated and formed the Life Regiment of Foot, Närke Regiment's military camp was taken over at Sannahed. There the regiment trained until 1912, after which the operations were transferred to Örebro. Sannahed came during World War II to act as a training area for the landstorm as well as parts of the regiment's units that did not fit in Örebro.

In 1944, the regiment added a new training area, Villingsberg, in Kilsbergen. The area was shared with the newly established Bergslagen Artillery Regiment (A 9).

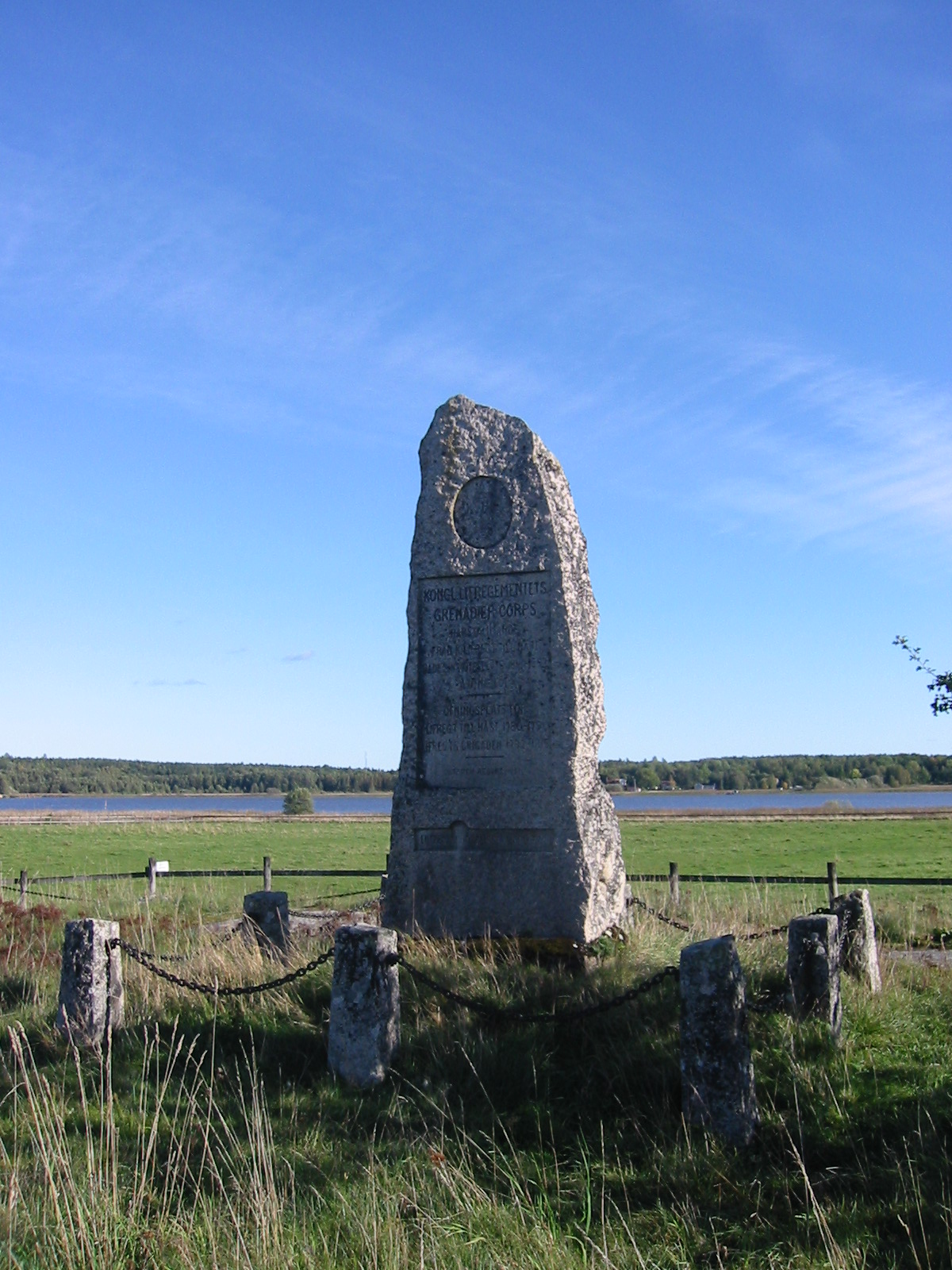
Memorial stone at Utnäslöt

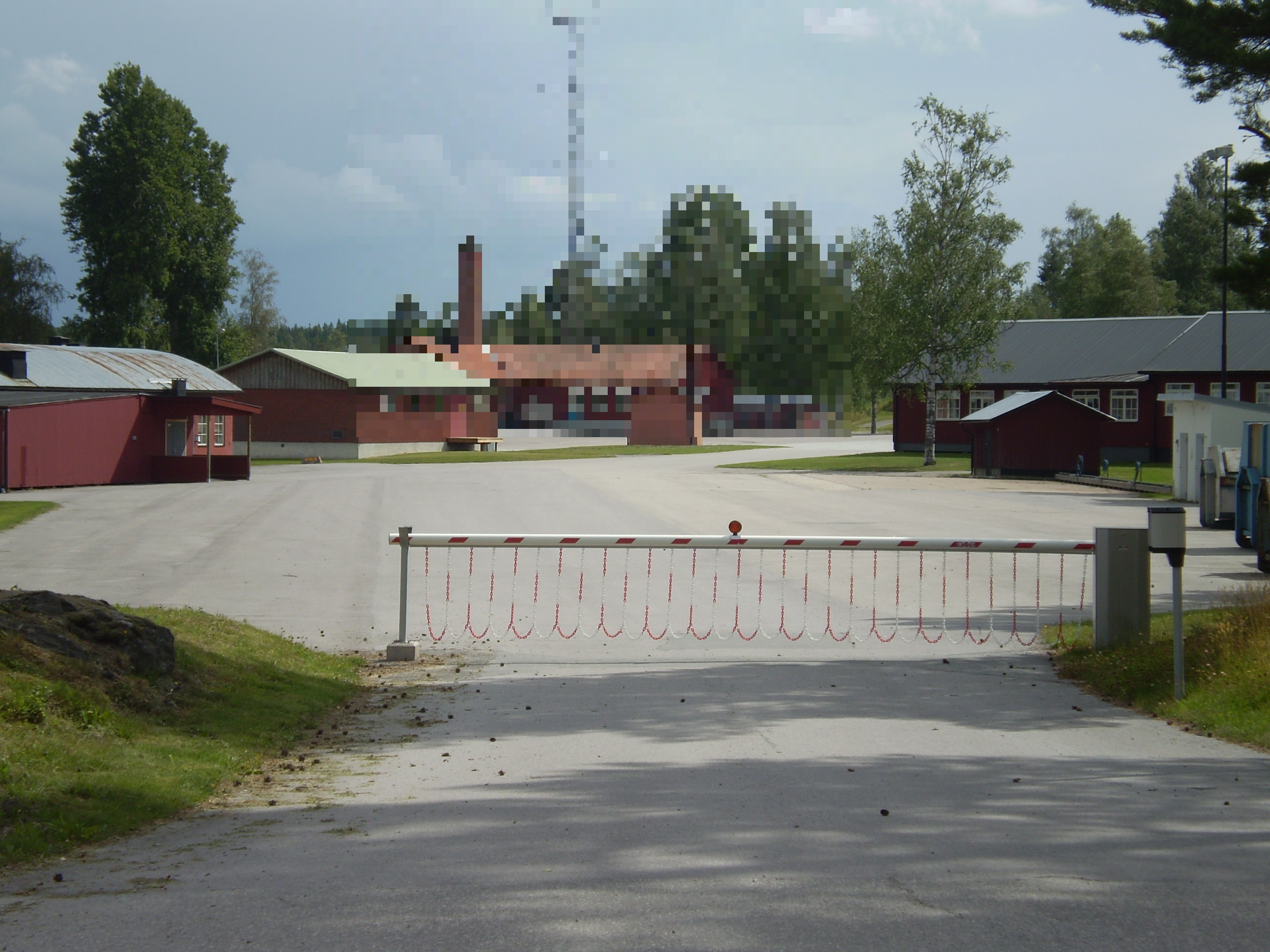
Buildings at Villingsberg

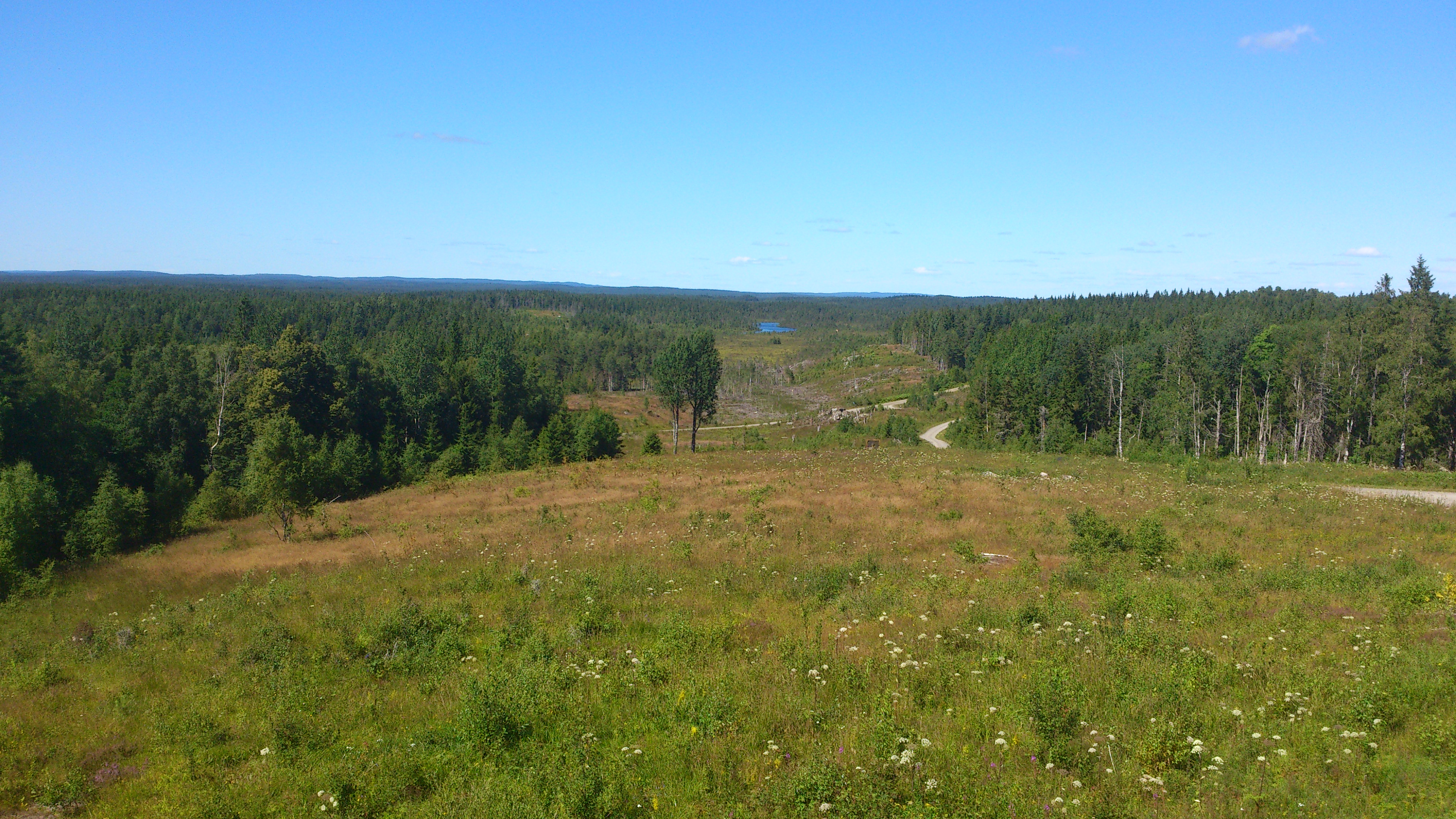
View of Villingsberg

== Heraldry and traditions ==
=== Colours, standards and guidons ===
The colour of the Life Regiment Grenadiers is drawn by Brita Grep and embroidered by hand in insertion technique by the company Libraria. The colour was presented to the regiment by His Majesty the King Gustaf VI Adolf on 12 December 1956. It was used as regimental colour by I 3/Fo 51 until 1 July 2000. Blazon: "On white cloth in the centre the Royal Swedish coat of arms as to the law without mantle. In each corner three yellow open crowns placed two and one. Battle honours (Lützen 1632, Oldendorf 1633, Wittstock 1636, Leipzig 1642, Warsaw 1656, Frederiksodde 1657, Tåget över Bält 1658, Lund 1676, Landskrona 1677, Narva 1700, Düna 1701, Kliszów 1702, Fraustadt 1706, Holowczyn 1708, Malatitze 1708, Hälsingborg 1710, Gadebusch 1712, Svensksund 1790) in yellow horizontally placed around the coat of arms."

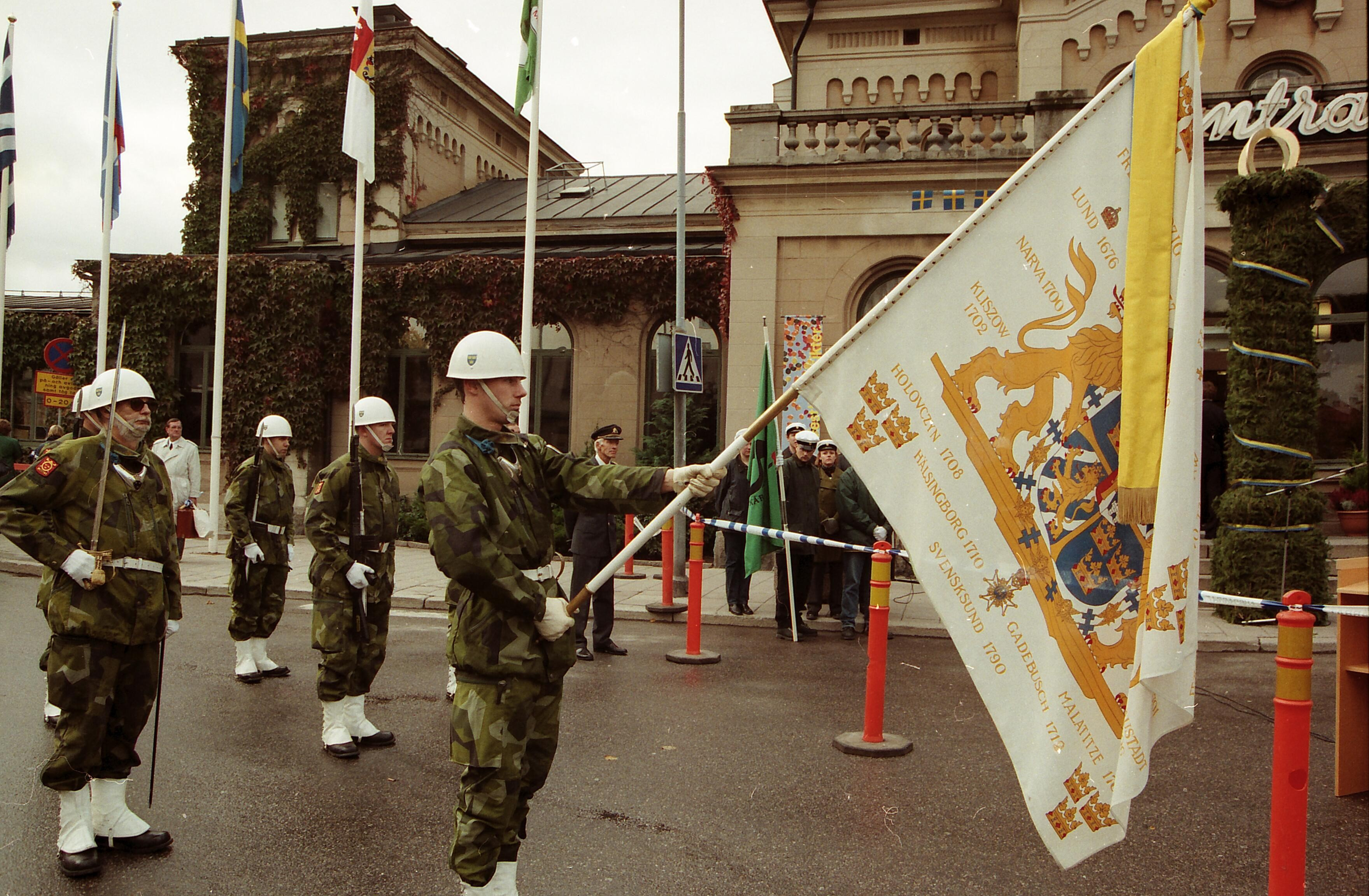
Colour guard in 1997

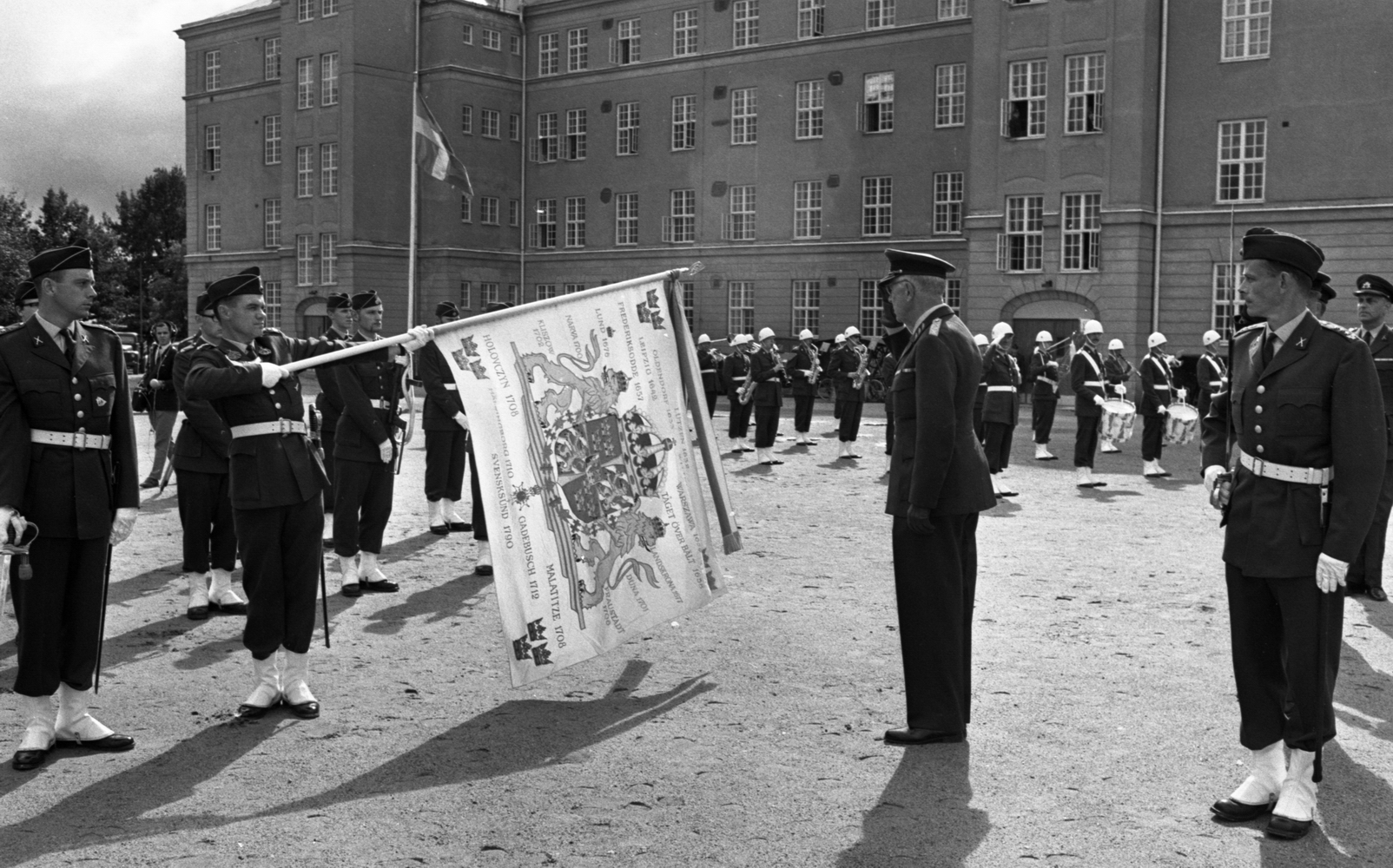
Colour guard in 1967

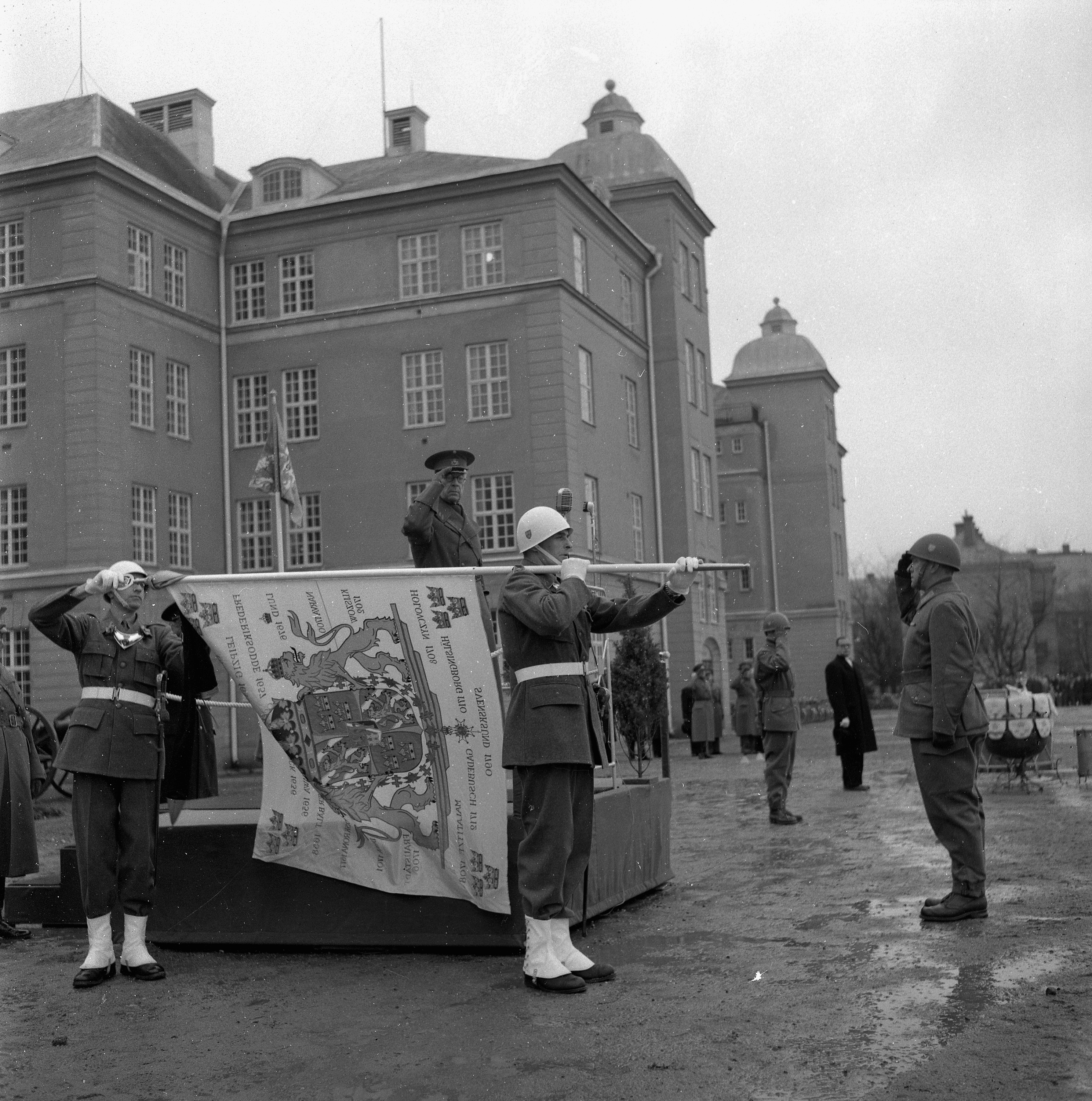
Colour guard in 1956

=== Coat of arms ===
The coat of arms of the unit was used from 1977 to 2000. Blazon: "Azure, the lesser coat of arms of Sweden, three open crowns or placed two and one. The shield surmounted two muskets in saltire and is surrounded by a roundel of straw placed under muskets and crown, all or."

=== Medals ===
In 1937, the Örebro försvarsområdes och Livregementets grenadjärers förtjänstmedalj ("Örebro Defence District and Life Regiment Grenadiers Medal of Merit") in gold, silver and bronze (Fo51/I3GM/SM/BM) of the 8th size was established. In 1991, it was renamed Livregementets grenadjärers (I 3) förtjänstmedalj ("Life Regiment Grenadiers (I 3) Medal of Merit") in gold, silver and bronze (LivreggrenGM/SM/BM). The medal ribbon is of white moiré with pale blue edges and a pale blue stripe on the middle.

In 2000, the Livregementets grenadjärers (I 3) minnesmedalj ("Life Regiment Grenadiers (I 3) Commemorative Medal") in silver (LivreggrenSMM) of the 8th size was established. The medal ribbon is of red moiré with a white stripe on the middle followed on both sides by a blue stripe.

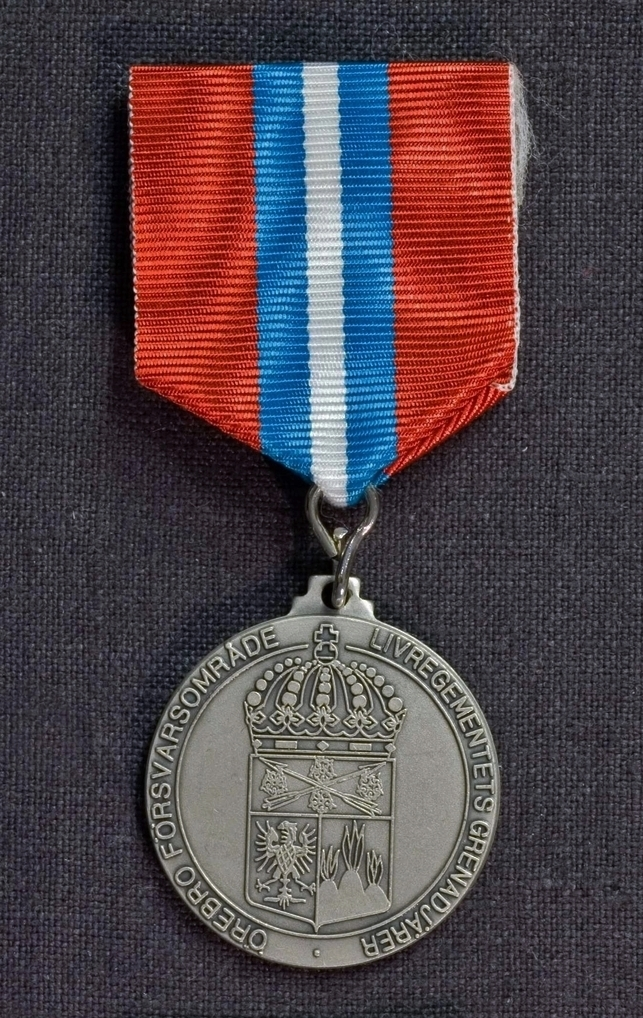
Life Regiment Grenadiers (I 3) Commemorative Medal (obverse)

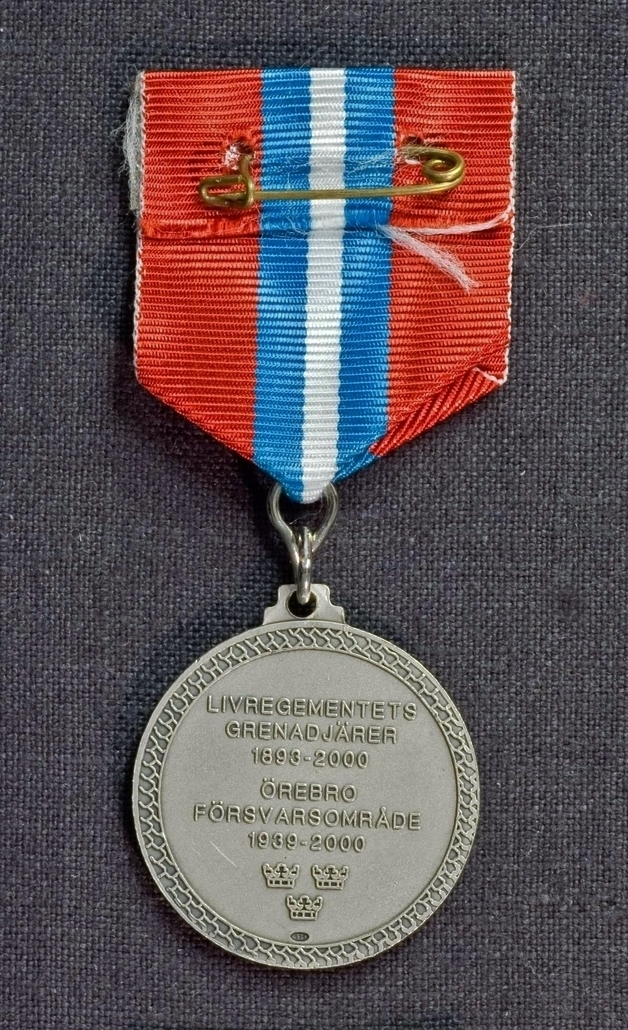
Life Regiment Grenadiers (I 3) Commemorative Medal (reverse)

== Commanding officers ==
Executive officers (Sekundchefer) and regimental commanders from 1815 to 2000. Sekundchef was a title used until 31 December 1974 in the regiments that were included in the King's Life and Household Troops (Kungl. Maj:ts Liv- och Hustrupper). From 1791 to 1809 the Crown Prince was regimental commander. From 1818 to 1974 His Majesty the King was regimental commander. From 1975 to 2000, the monarch was honorary commander of the regiment. However, Åke Hultin retained the title of Sekundchef until his departure in 1977.

=== Executive officers ===
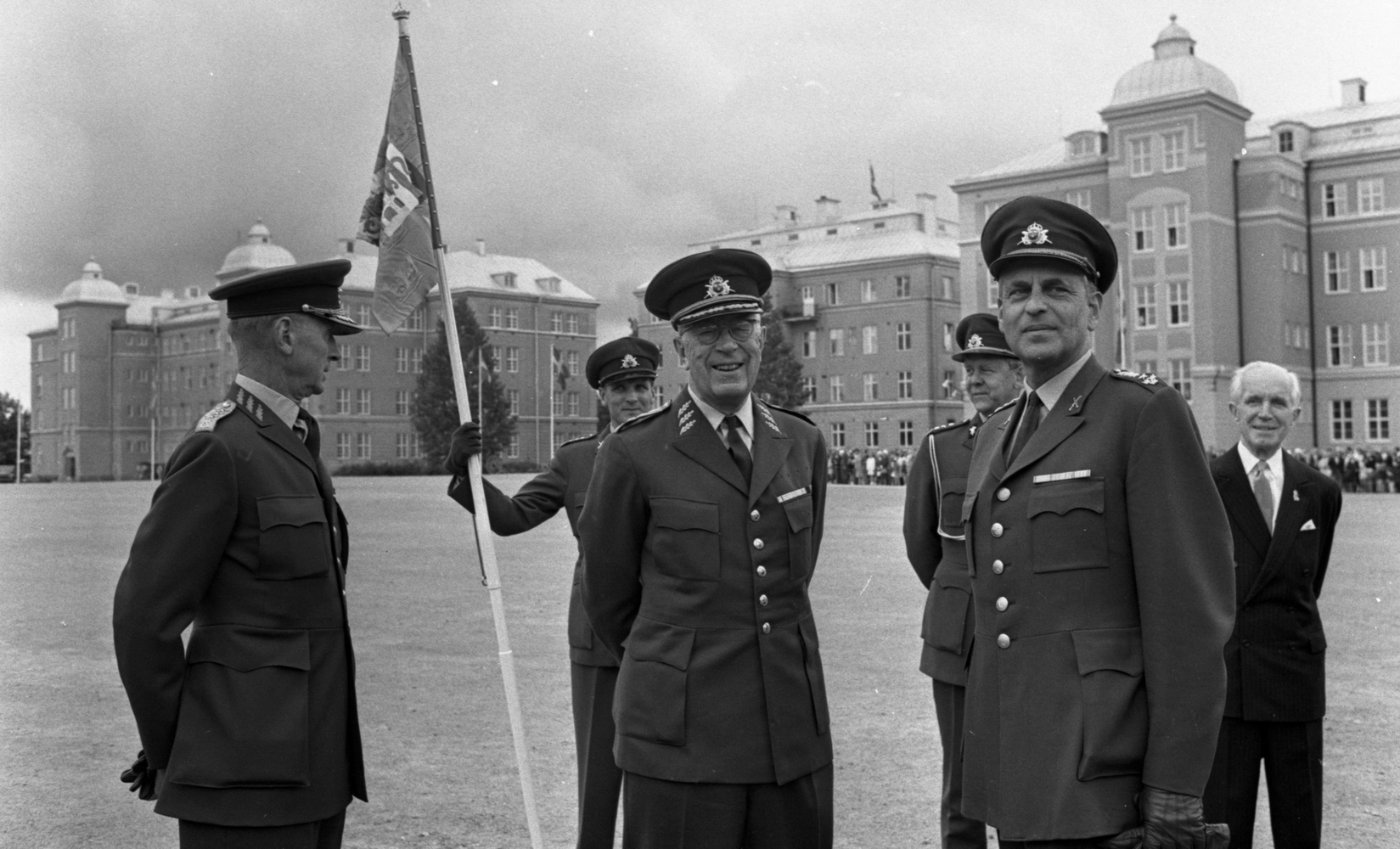
The regimental commander, His Majesty King Gustaf VI Adolf (center) and the executive officer, Colonel Ebbe Gyllenstierna (right) in 1967.

- 1815–1821: C U Ridderstolpe
- 1821–1853: J E af Wetterstedt
- 1853–1861: N H Hägerflycht
- 1861–1865: O M von Knorring
- 1865–1875: H M Falkenberg
- 1875–1879: O E F Flemming
- 1879–1881: A H Leijonhufvud
- 1881–1884: H O E d'Ailly
- 1884–1893: C G von Ehrenheim
- 1893–1897: J F Lilliehök
- 1897–1902: Carl Axel Mauritz Nordenskjöld
- 1902–1911: Hugo Jungstedt
- 1911–1917: Hans Ludvig von Dardel
- 1917–1922: Carl August Pontus Axelsson Sjögren
- 1922–1927: Hugo Oskar Herman Wikner
- 1928–1931: Ernst Nils David af Sandeberg
- 1931–1936: Colonel Hugo Cederschiöld
- 1936–1937: Colonel Helge Jung
- 1936–1937: Lieutenant colonel Axel Gyllenkrok (acting)
- 1937–1942: Manne Brandel
- 1942–1947: Colonel Alf Meyerhöffer
- 1947–1949: Engelbrekt Flodström (acting)
- 1949–1952: Engelbrekt Flodström
- 1952–1955: Carl Fredrik Lemmel
- 1955–1963: Per Wollrath Sebastian H:son Tamm
- 1963–1963: Colonel Sten Wåhlin
- 1964–1966: Colonel Ove Ljung
- 1966–1972: Colonel Ebbe Gyllenstierna
- 1972–1974: Erik Åke Hultin

=== Regimental commanders ===
- 1815–1818: Crown Prince Charles John
- 1818–1844: Charles XIV John
- 1844–1859: Oscar I
- 1859–1872: Charles XV
- 1872–1905: Oscar II
- 1907–1950: Gustaf V
- 1950–1973: Gustaf VI Adolf
- 1973–1974: Carl XVI Gustaf
- 1975–1977: Åke Hultin
- 1977–1983: Senior colonel John Petersson
- 1983–1992: Einar Lyth
- 1992–1998: Hans Hacksell
- 1998–2000: Christer Svensson

=== Deputy regimental commanders ===
- 1979–1981: Colonel Jörn Beckmann

== Names, designations and locations ==
Name	Translation	From		To
Kungl. Livregementets grenadjärkår	Royal Life Regiment Grenadier Corps	1815-12-16	–	1893-12-14
Kungl. Livregementet till fot	Royal Life Regiment of Foot	1893-12-15	–	1904-12-07
Kungl. Livregementet grenadjärer	Royal Life Regiment Grenadiers	1904-12-08	–	1974-12-31
Livregementets grenadjärer	Life Regiment Grenadiers	1975-01-01	–	2000-06-30
Avvecklingsorganisation Örebro	Decommissioning Organisation Örebro	2000-07-01	–	2000-12-31
Designation		From		To
No. 3		1816-10-01	–	1914-09-30
I 3		1914-10-01	–	1975-06-30
I 3/Fo 51		1975-07-01	–	1992-06-30
Fo 51		1992-07-01	–	1994-06-30
I 3/Fo 51		1994-07-01	–	2000-06-30
Ao Öre		2000-07-01	–	2000-12-31
Location		From		To
Örebro Garrison		1904-10-01	–	2000-12-31

== See also ==
- List of Swedish infantry regiments
