= Alf Meyerhöffer =

Swedish Army officer and politician (1891–1962)

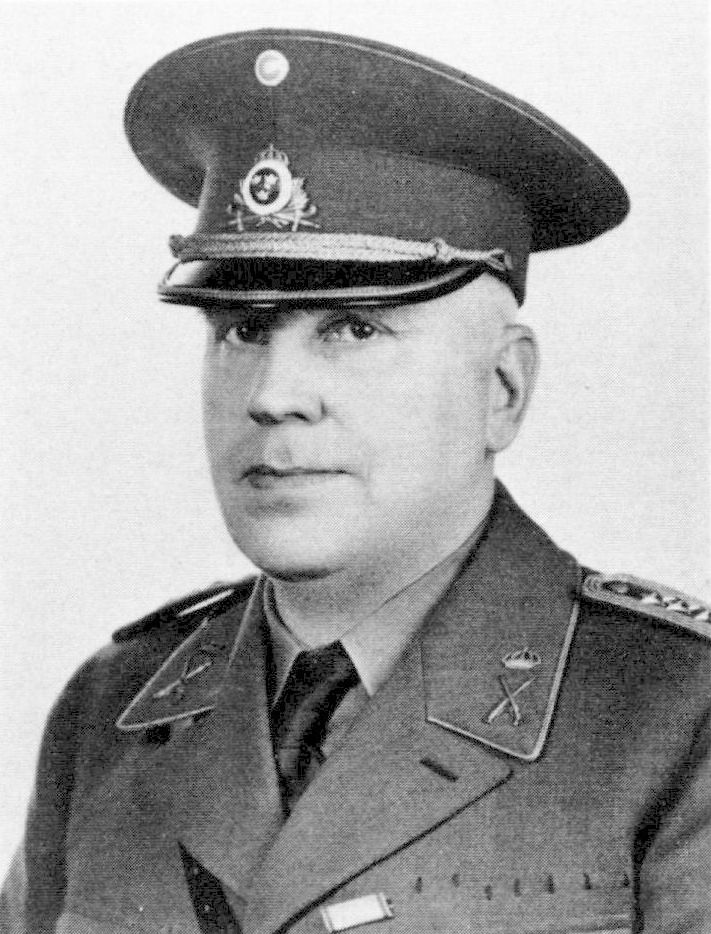
- Born: Alf Roar Dag Meyerhöffer; 16 December 1891; Luleå, Sweden
- Died: 29 April 1962 (aged 70); Stockholm, Sweden
- Military career
- Allegiance: Sweden
- Branch: Swedish Army
- Service years: 1913–1952
- Rank: Colonel
- Commands: 2nd Army Division Staff; Field regiment I 35; Life Regiment Grenadiers; Inspector of the Infantry and Cavalry

Alf Roar Dag Meyerhöffer (16 December 1891 – 29 April 1962) was a Swedish Army officer and politician, who represented Högerpartiet in Swedish parliament Riksdag from 1932 to 1936.

Meyerhöffer is mostly known for the Meyerhöffer affair which began in 1947, where the question was whether a skilled, well-qualified, Nazi-influenced officer could be promoted. In this case, there was great disagreement within both the officer corps and the government. This case also received a lot of attention in the press. In parallel with his political activities, he made a career as an officer. He was generally perceived as a rare skilled troop commander who was more interested in the pedagogical part of the profession than in the purely strategic issues. He never served as an officer in the General Staff but only as an aspirant. Meyerhöffer's political appearance constituted a burden for him in his professional career.

== Early life ==
Meyerhöffer was born on 16 December 1891 in Luleå, the son of Major Teodor Meyerhöffer and his wife Ida Ekman. It is likely that Meyerhöffer was deeply influenced by the sentiments prevailing in the officer corps in the decade before the World War I; moods characterized by distrust of Soviet Union - the Red Scare - and a nationalism that was often combined with the worship of Charles XII and the dream of a new era of Swedish heyday. He passed studentexamen at Luleå högre allmänna läroverk on 4 June 1910 and became a volunteer in Norrbotten Regiment on 6 May 1911 and he was commissioned as an officer on 20 December 1913.

== Career ==
=== Military career ===
Meyerhöffer became an underlöjtnant in Norrbotten Regiment on 31 December 1913 and was promoted to lieutenant on 1 January 1917. Meyerhöffer served as a regimental adjutant there from 1919 to 1922 and from 1922 to 1924 he was a student at the Royal Swedish Army Staff College. He then served as an aspirant in the General Staff from 15 October 1925 to 1927 and he became captain in Norrbotten Regiment on 15 November 1928. Meyerhöffer was a city council (stadsfullmäktige) member in Boden from 1930 to 1932 and was an agent of the King in Council in Norrbotten Shooting Association (Norrbottens skytteförbund) from 1930 to 1934 as well as a member of the Norrbotten County Council from 1930 to 1938. Meyerhöffer was a member of the Andra kammaren between 1933 and 1936 (member of Andra kammaren's third temporary committee in 1933, of Andra kammaren's first temporary committee from 1934 to 1936). He then became a major of the Jämtland Ranger Regiment on 11 December 1936. He was promoted to lieutenant colonel there and appointed contingency officer in the staff of the 2nd Army Division (II. arméfördelningen) on 1 October 1939. Meyerhöffer was head of this staff from 1941 to 1942 and commanding officer of the I 35 field regiment from 8 May to September 1942. On 1 October 1942, Meyerhöffer was promoted to colonel and appointed regimental commander of the Life Regiment Grenadiers.

=== Meyerhöffer affair ===
In 1947 he became the centerpiece in the so-called Meyerhöffer affair. The Meyerhöffer affair became the second major, internal Swedish military reckoning (after the Nils Rosenblad affair) with the pro-German sentiments within the Swedish officer corps. Unlike the Rosenblad affair, which dealt with the question of persuading a pro-German officer, who had become a burden for the corps, to resign, it was now a question of whether a skilled, well-respected, Nazi-influenced officer could be promoted. As an avid proponent of a strong Swedish defence, Meyerhöffer viewed the Defence Act of 1925 with disbelief. Unlike the circle of mainly young officers, who gathered around Helge Jung and Ny Militär Tidskrift to work within the framework of their own organization for a different and more modern defence, he chose to work politically. Meyerhöffer joined the National Youth League of Sweden (SNU) and came to belong to the group within SNU, which pushed for a break with The Right, largely due to the defence issue. Meyerhöffer was elected to the Riksdag for Norrbotten in 1932 but was not re-elected in 1936. Within the SNU, a combat organization was formed modelled after a Nazi organization and Meyerhöffer was appointed union leader for the groups. They began to appear in uniform at mass meetings, where Meyerhöffer was the leading speaker. Uniform meetings were prohibited by a Riksdag decision. In the Riksdag, Meyerhöffer exercised several times to have the uniform ban lifted. After Meyerhöffer was appointed Colonel and Executive Commander of the Life Regiment Grenadiers in 1942, his political activities came to an end.

In 1947 he was proposed by the Chief of the Army, Lieutenant General Archibald Douglas, as Inspector of the Infantry and Cavalry. The Minister of Defence Allan Vougt had no objections, but the former Minister of Defence Per Edvin Sköld, together with several other ministers, was against the appointment. A politically awkward situation threatened because both Vougt, Douglas and Meyerhöffer wanted to resign from their respective posts if an appointment did not take place. The issue soon attracted the attention of the press. A compromise was reached which meant that Meyerhöffer only became acting inspector. Only a couple of years later did the final appointment come. Political and personal contradictions (in many ways by Douglas' cousin, the new Chief of the Army since 1948, Lieutenant General Carl August Ehrensvärd) led, however, that he prematurely requested to leave his post in 1951. He was transferred to the reserve in 1952.

== Personal life ==
On 15 November 1919 in Umeå, he married Mabel Amanda Falkman (16 November 1890 in Great Falls, Montana, USA – 6 August 1968 in Stockholm), the daughter of Frans Edward Falkman and Olinda Pettersson.

== Death ==
Meyerhöffer died on 29 April 1962 in Sankt Matteus Parish in Stockholm.

== Dates of rank ==
- 1913 – Underlöjtnant
- 1917 – Lieutenant
- 1928 – Captain
- 1936 – Major
- 1939 – Lieutenant colonel
- 1942 – Colonel

== Honours ==
- Member of the Royal Swedish Academy of War Sciences (1947)

== Bibliography ==
- Meyerhöffer, Alf (1957). Svensk motståndsrörelse (in Swedish) (2nd ed.). Karlskrona. SELIBR 3262045.
- Meyerhöffer, Alf (1957). Det fria Europas försvar (in Swedish). Stockholm: Folkförsvaret. SELIBR 660660.
- Meyerhöffer, Alf (1959). Svensk krigsmakt vid rymd- och kärnvapenkrig (in Swedish). Stockholm: Folkförsvaret. SELIBR 1887825.
- Meyerhöffer, Alf (1955). Svensk motståndsrörelse (in Swedish). Stockholm: Folkförsvarets förlag. SELIBR 1192476.
- Meyerhöffer, Alf (1954). Sverige och Västeuropas försvar (in Swedish). Stockholm: Folkförsvaret. SELIBR 1443768.
- Meyerhöffer, Alf (1956). Sveriges försvar och atomvapnet (in Swedish). Stockholm: Folkförsvarets förlag. SELIBR 1192473.
- Meyerhöffer, Alf (1958). Sveriges viktigaste försvarsfråga: alliansfrihet eller atlantpaktsanslutning (in Swedish). Stockholm: Folkförsvarets förlag. SELIBR 1192467.
- Meyerhöffer, Alf (1953). Svenskt invasionsförsvar (in Swedish). [Stockholm]: Folkförsvaret. SELIBR 1443767.
- Meyerhöffer, Alf (1953). Hur kan Sverige militärt försvaras? (in Swedish). [Stockholm]: Folkförsvaret. SELIBR 1443764.
- Meyerhöffer, Alf (1954). Generalstab och trupp (in Swedish). [Stockholm]: Folkförsvaret. SELIBR 1443763.
- Meyerhöffer, Alf (1952). Infanteriets stridsutbildning (in Swedish). Stockholm: Folkförsvaret. SELIBR 1443765.
- Meyerhöffer, Alf (1952). Det svenska infanteriet (in Swedish). [Stockholm]: Folkförsvaret. SELIBR 1443766.

Military offices
| Preceded by Manne Brandel | Life Regiment Grenadiers; 1942–1947 | Succeeded by Anders Engelbrekt Flodström |
| Preceded by Gunnar Berggren | Inspector of the Infantry and Cavalry; 1947–1951 | Succeeded by Gustaf Aschan |
