= Sannahed =

- Location within Örebro Location within Sweden
- Coordinates: 59°06′N 15°09′E
- Country: Sweden
- Province: Närke
- County: Örebro County
- Municipality: Kumla Municipality

Area
  - Total: 0.46 km^{2} (0.18 sq mi)

Population (31 December 2010)
  - Total: 417
  - Density: 901/km^{2} (2,330/sq mi)
- Time zone: UTC+1 (CET)
  - Summer (DST): UTC+2 (CEST)

Sannahed is a locality situated in Kumla Municipality, Örebro County, Sweden with 417 inhabitants in 2010.
