= Netunice =

- Municipality
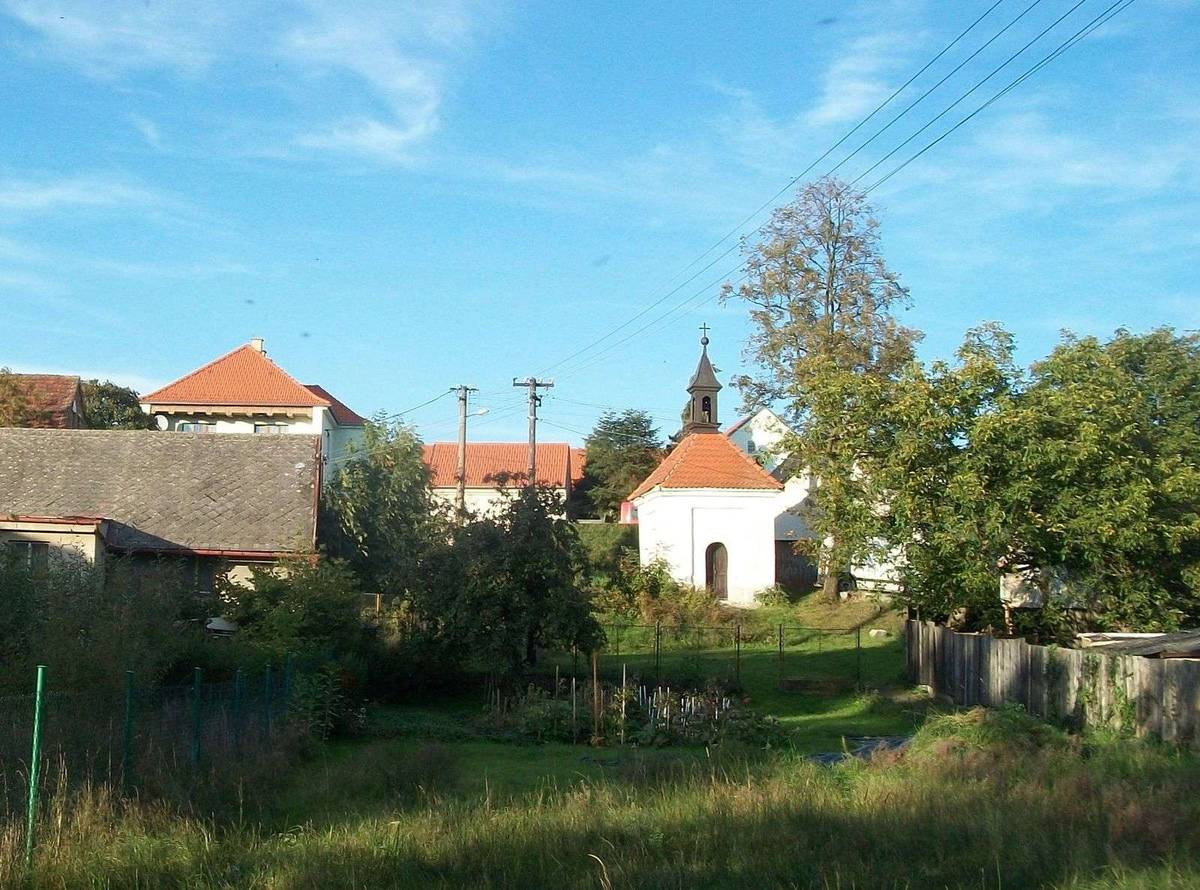
- Chapel in Netunice

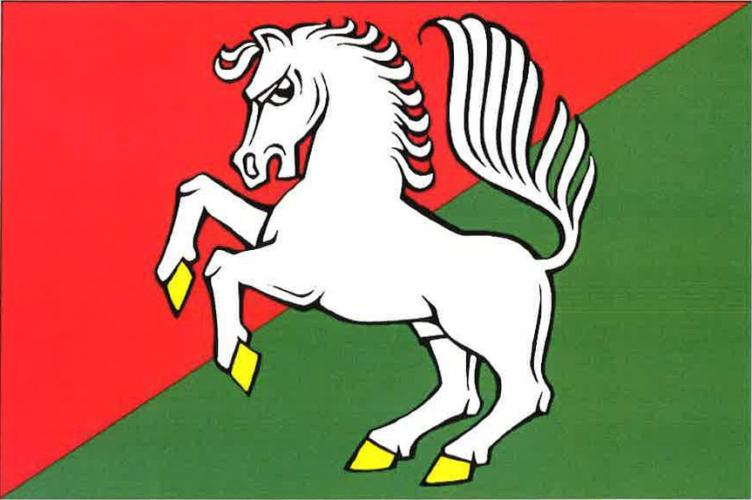
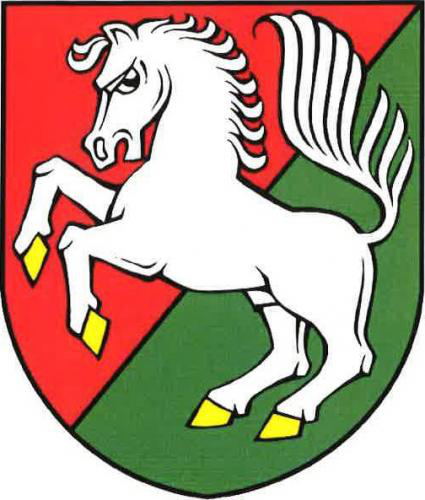
- Flag Coat of arms

- Location in the Czech Republic
- Coordinates: 49°36′59″N 13°25′50″E
- Country: Czech Republic
- Region: Plzeň
- District: Plzeň-South
- First mentioned: 1192

Area
  - Total: 5.04 km^{2} (1.95 sq mi)
- Elevation: 455 m (1,493 ft)

Population (2026-01-01)
  - Total: 212
  - Density: 42.1/km^{2} (109/sq mi)
- Time zone: UTC+1 (CET)
  - Summer (DST): UTC+2 (CEST)
- Postal code: 332 04
- Website: www.netunice.cz

Netunice is a municipality and village in Plzeň-South District in the Plzeň Region of the Czech Republic. It has about 200 inhabitants.

Netunice lies approximately 16 kilometres (10 mi) south of Plzeň and 89 km (55 mi) south-west of Prague.

== Demographics ==
Historical population
Year	Pop.	±%
1869	273	—
1880	323	+18.3%
1890	330	+2.2%
1900	314	−4.8%
1910	312	−0.6%
1921	329	+5.4%
1930	297	−9.7%
1950	252	−15.2%
1961	236	−6.3%
1970	222	−5.9%
1980	190	−14.4%
1991	167	−12.1%
2001	158	−5.4%
2011	175	+10.8%
2021	202	+15.4%
Source: Censuses
