= Crossing of the Düna =

Battle of the Great Northern War

Coordinates: 56°59′N 24°04′E

- Part of the Great Northern War
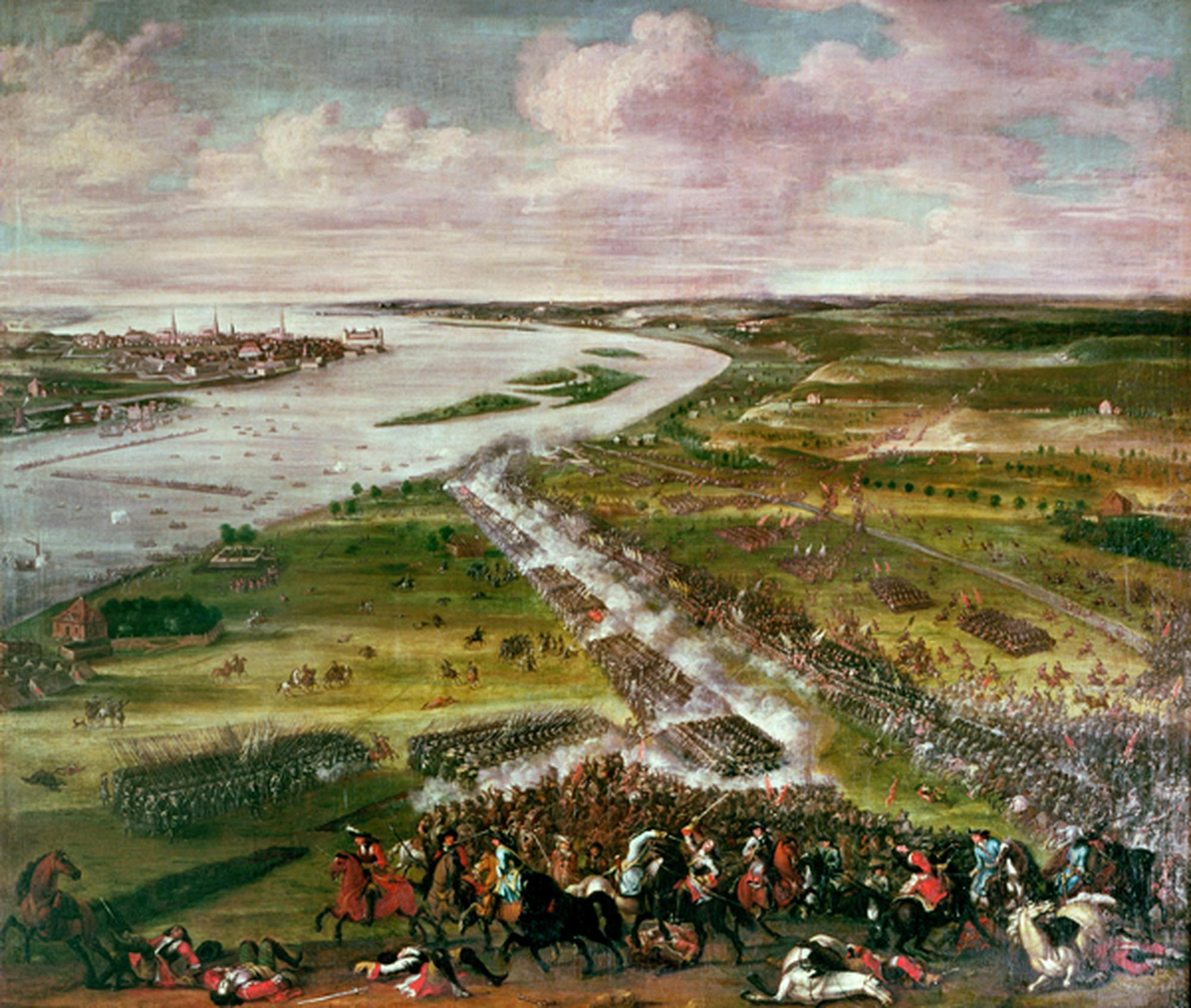
- Crossing of the Düna 1701 by Daniel Stawert
Date	8 July 1701 (O.S.); 9 July 1701 (Swedish calendar); 19 July 1701 (N.S.)
Location	Riga, Swedish Livonia (present-day Latvia)
Result	Swedish victory
Territorial changes	Coalition forces retreat

Belligerents
(yes) Swedish Empire	Electorate of Saxony; Duchy of Courland; Tsardom of Russia

Commanders and leaders
(Swedish Empire) Charles XII	(Electorate of Saxony) Adam Heinrich von Steinau (Electorate of Saxony) Otto Arnold von Paykull; Ferdinand Kettler (Tsardom of Russia) Anikita Repnin

Strength
14,000 men: of which 7,000 engaged	20,000–29,000 men: of which 13,000 engaged

Casualties and losses
100 killed, 400 wounded	1,300 killed and wounded, 700 captured

The Crossing of the Düna (also known as Battle of Daugava or Battle of Spilves) took place during the Great Northern War on 19 July 1701 near the city of Riga, present-day Latvia. The Swedish king Charles XII was in hot pursuit of king Augustus II the Strong of the Polish–Lithuanian Commonwealth and Saxony. The crossing was easily made, and the coalition troops were quickly broken and retreated.

== Prelude ==
During the first year of fighting in the Great Northern War, Charles XII of Sweden had delivered two crushing defeats on his enemies. In July 1700, he forced Frederick IV of Denmark-Norway out of the coalition against Sweden, after a brief landing on Humlebæk. He then settled to aid the besieged Narva (which at the time belonged to the Swedish Empire). On his arrival, late November, he managed to decisively defeat the Russians despite being heavily outnumbered, in the Battle of Narva, which led to an end of the Russian campaign for the year. Charles then turned his attention against the south and the Polish-Lithuanian Commonwealth to deal with his last opponent—August the Strong—before going into Russia. The combined Saxon–Russian army of totally 29,000 men had entrenched themselves across the 600 meter wide Düna River under the command of Adam Heinrich von Steinau.

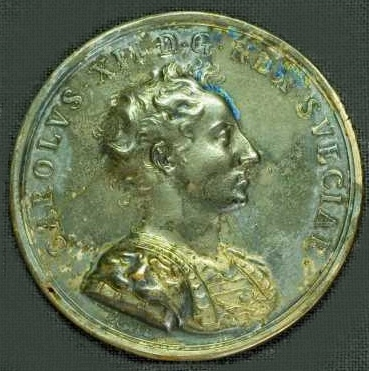
Medallion of Charles

Orders were sent from the Swedish king to the governor-general of Livonia, Erik Dahlbergh, in preparations for the crossing before the arrival of the Swedish main army. Dahlbergh was ordered to obtain around 200 landing boats of different sizes and was also instructed to build a bridge in order to transfer the cavalry across the river. The operation was supposed to be done in strict confidentiality to ensure a surprise attack on the enemies. The Swedish army of 14,000 men arrived at Riga on 17 July, and already by the time, preparations for the attack were completed. However, bad weather ruined the Swedish plans to attack instantly, and the assault had to be postponed. A Swedish cavalry regiment was left to threaten Kokenhusen, effectively forcing Steinau to split his forces, so the bulk of his army stayed across Riga.

The allied army was initially under the command of Saxon general Otto Arnold von Paykull and Ferdinand Kettler of Courland, who were both ensured of an easy victory. In their confidence, they prioritized their numbers, advantageous position, redoubts and Saxon courage in superiority over the Swedes. Prior to the battle, Kettler pronounced: "even a superior force of three hundred thousand Swedes, would still not be enough, to successfully achieve any progress with the crossing". The Saxon army was, however, deployed a distance away from the beach, to allow a few Swedish regiments to land, before it planned to massively strike with its full capacity to drive the Swedes back and capture the Swedish king (who was expected to be among the first to land.

== Battle ==
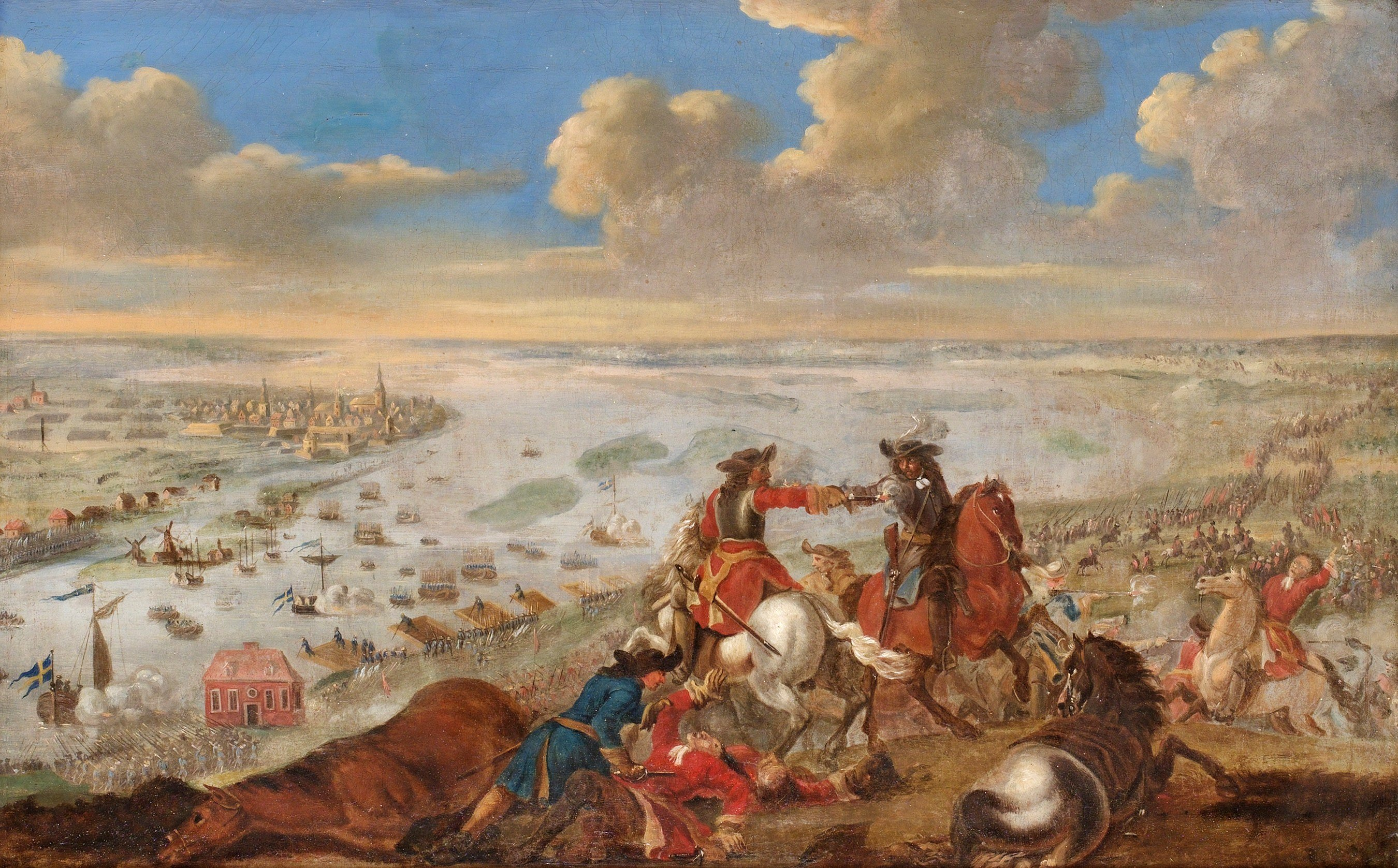
Charles XII is crossing the Düna

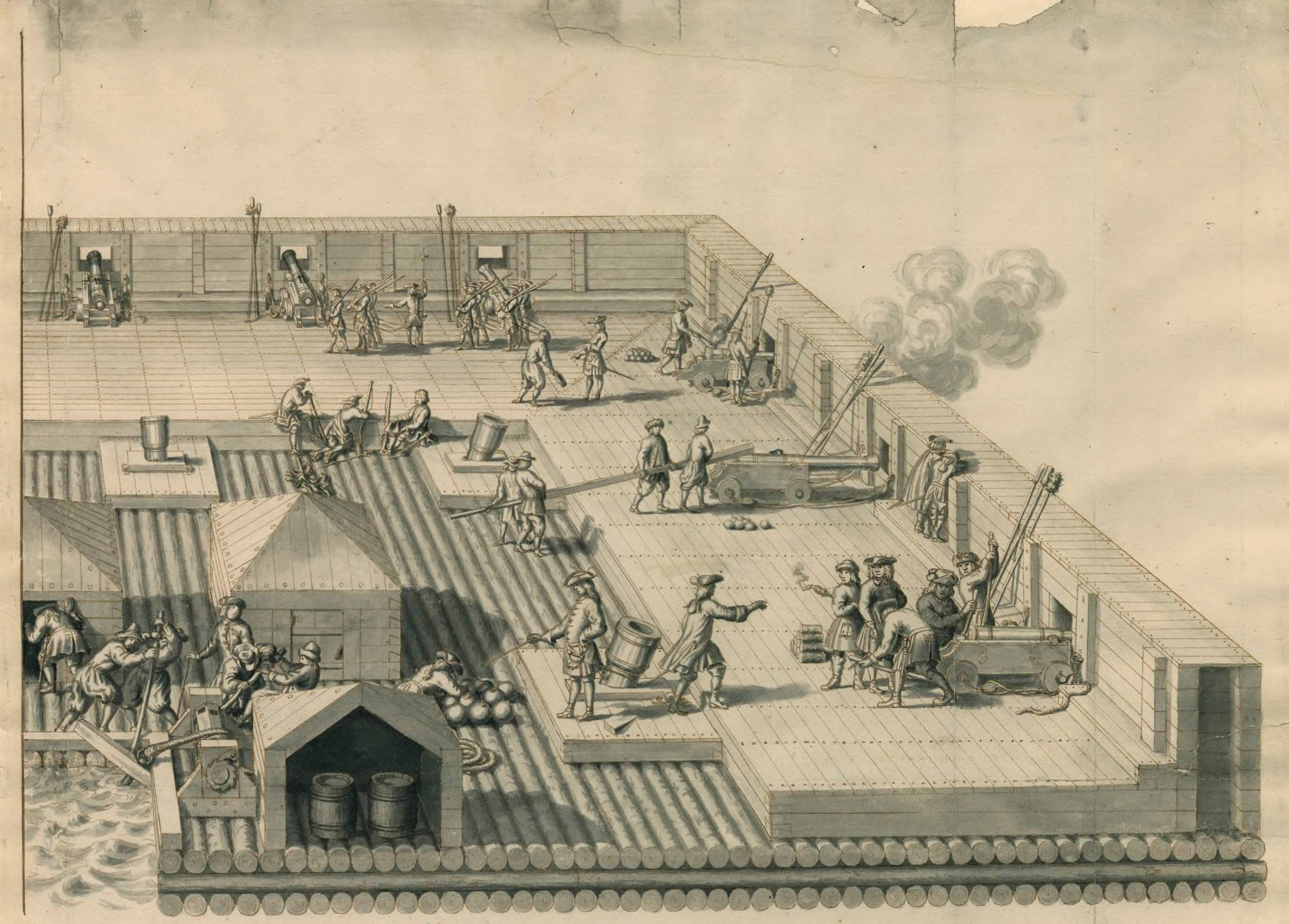
Swedish floating battery, similar used at Düna

During the evening of 18 July, a little more than 6,000 Swedish infantry and 535 cavalry (among them the Drabant Corps) started to embark their landing boats in silence (there were about 195 boats of different structures and sizes, including four floating batteries with 10 cannons each and a corvette with 16 cannons). Swedish guns from Riga had continually bombarded the allied entrenchments across the river the same day and would continue doing so throughout the night and landing. After all the troops were embarked, the Swedes first torched some small boats and pushed them into the river, forming a smoke screen; then, at four o'clock in the morning of the 19th, the attack began.

Halfway across the river, after passing the cover afforded by the island of Fossenholm, the Swedes were discovered and fired at. The four Swedish floating batteries returned fire, and after half an hour, the Swedes reached the beach and were immediately thrown into fight against Saxon patrols. When about 3,000 Swedish troops were ashore, the Saxons launched their first major assault, with 3,500 men. However, the Swedish force under the personal command of the king himself, would not retreat and the attack was beaten back. The Swedes then sequentially stormed and took the nearby Garras redoubt which seized them ground of at least 200 paces inland, where they managed to establish a good foothold, covering the ongoing construction of the floating bridge.

After a brief stalemate, the Swedes formed up to repulse a second attack made by the Saxon general Otto Arnold von Paykull who strictly intended to drive them back before the arrival of further Swedish reinforcements. This attack, as the previous one, was repulsed. By this time the Saxon general Adam Heinrich von Steinau returned from Kokenhusen with large reinforcements and gained the command. He ordered a third assault on the Swedish stand, which at this time had almost every man ready from the landing. Since the Swedish left flank was protected by the river, Steinau gathered his cavalry in an attempt to attack the Swedish right which was rather unprotected. The attack had some success at first, but was subsequently beaten off after an ongoing attack in the rear by the Swedish cavalry.

At seven o'clock in the morning, Saxon commander Heinrich von Steinau went for a council of war with his generals and decided to withdraw from the battle. Another wave was thrown at the Swedes in order to cover the retreat. However, bad weather prevented final constructions of the bridge which denied the crossing of the Swedish cavalry and so August II slipped away with his army. The Swedes lost 100 men dead and another 400 wounded. The allied forces lost about 1,300 dead and wounded and another 700 captured. 36 artillery pieces and four standards and banners had also been conquered by the Swedes. A unit of around 400 Russian soldiers, that became surrounded on the island of Lucavsala, refused to surrender and was later almost completely annihilated by the Swedes, while also taking casualties. A monument to commemorate them was built at the location in 1891 and later restored in 2003.

== Aftermath ==
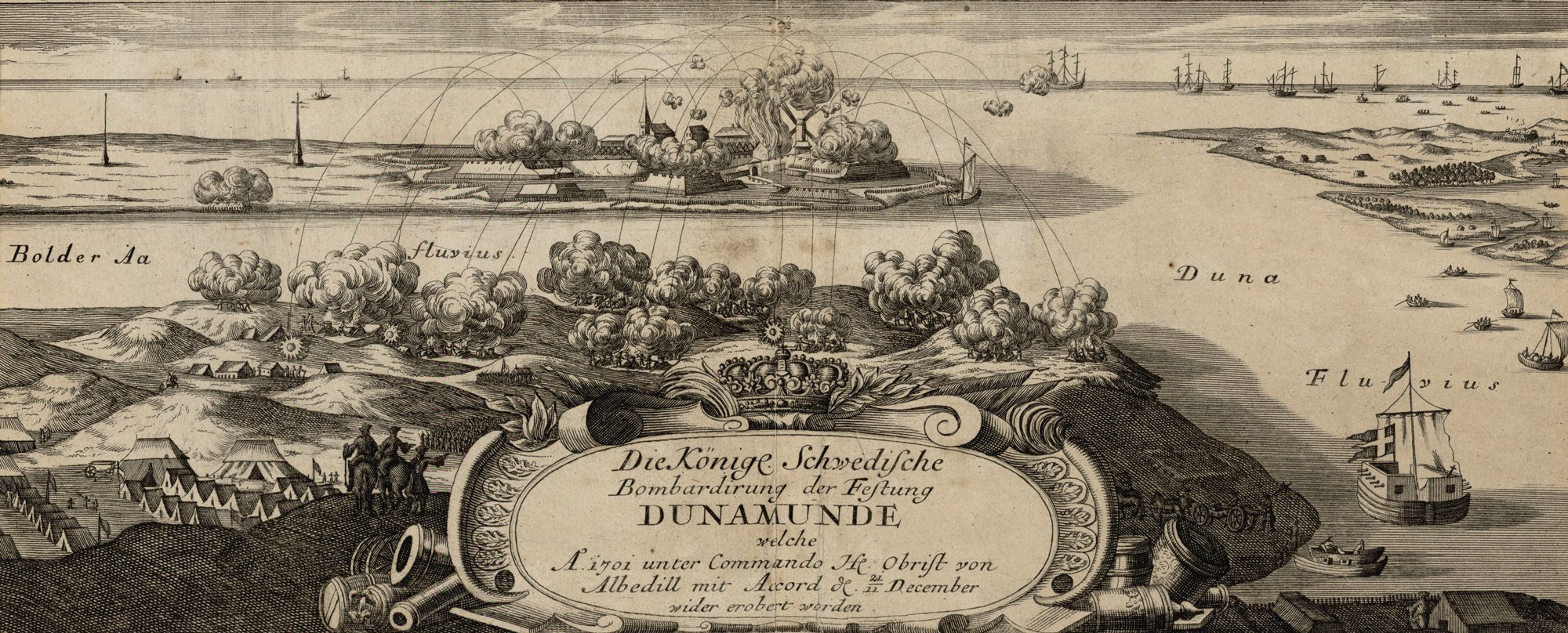
Swedish bombardment of Dünamünde, 1701

After the battle Charles laid siege and took Mitau (where he gained 8,000 muskets and 9,000 pistols) and then stormed the Cobron redoubt, where 400 Russians were stationed, only after a massacre the redoubt was taken with as few as twenty Russians still alive. Charles later laid siege to Dünamunde and shortly after started persecuting the retreating forces who had initially been 20,000 men strong during the fighting. The 10,000 strong Russian force under Anikita Ivanovich Repnin retreated towards Russia after having scarcely been participating in the main battle. The Saxons retreated to neutral Prussia and thus left all of Courland open for Charles who seized the initiative and took Kokenhusen.

In preparation for the crossing, king Charles XII had ordered to build the first bridge across the Daugava River, which was made of anchored and interconnected by ropes and boats. After the Swedish victory, the city was left with the structure. In 1705, the bridge, which had been lodged for the winter in Vējzaķsalas Bay, was washed away by the high spring waters. Later, the floating bridge was restored, but in 1710, it was again destroyed by the Russian army during the siege of Riga.

During the battle, small barges armed with cannons were used, thus combining land and sea forces as well as deception (smoke) to achieve a victory, carefully planned and well executed. Participants included Otto Arnold von Paykull.

== Gallery ==
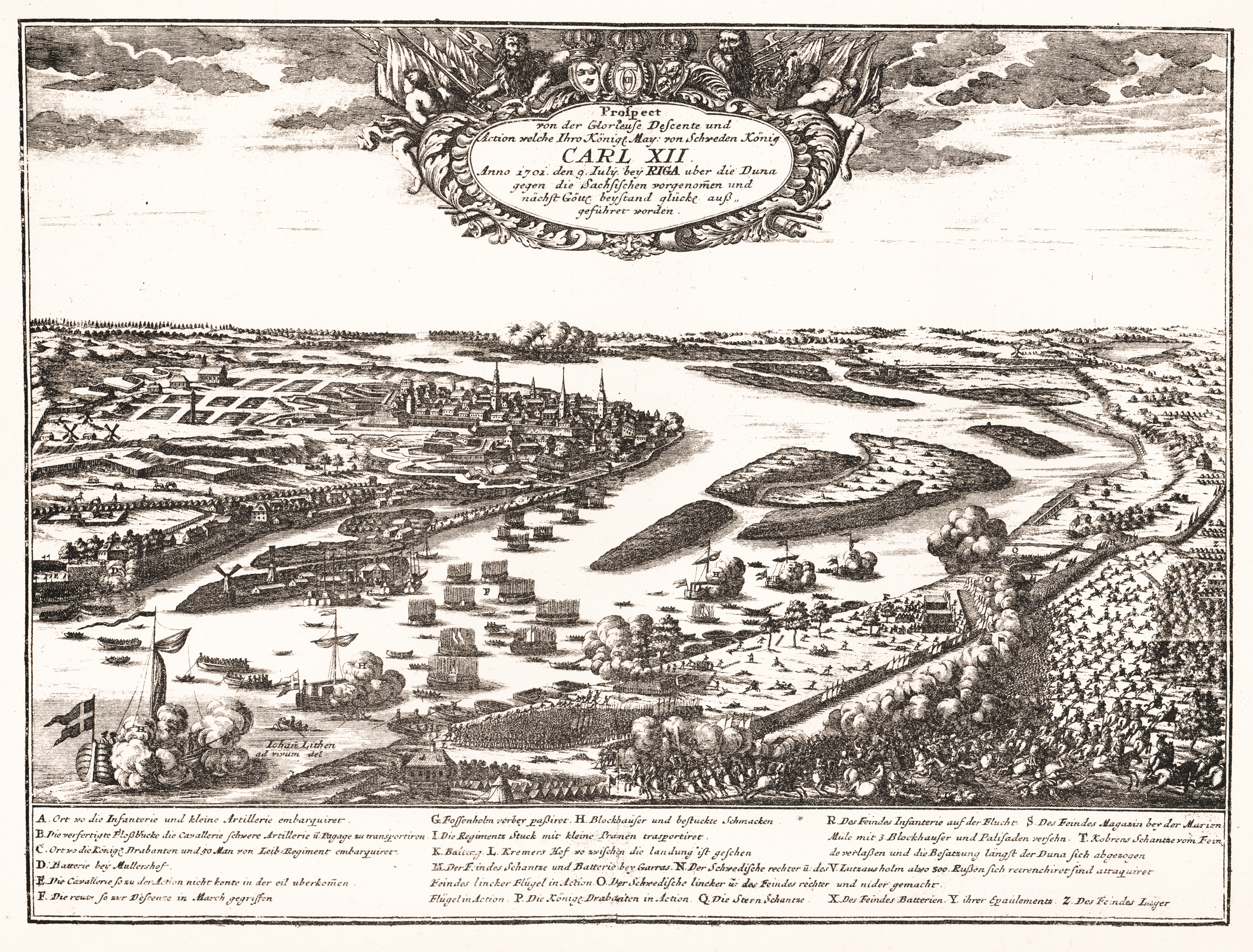
Charles XII crosses the Düna. Engraving by Johan Lithen

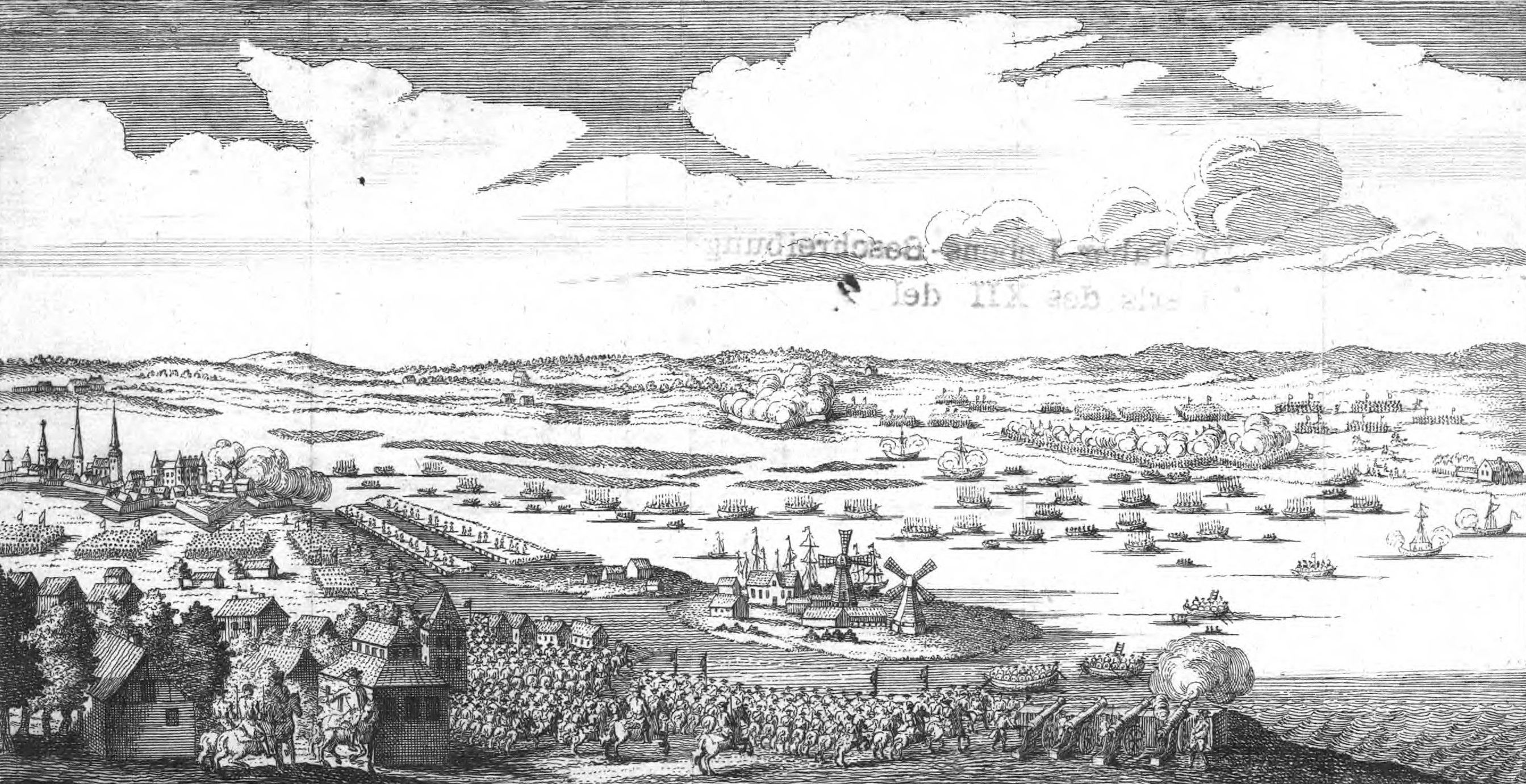
On the night of 9 July 1701, Charles XII crossed the Düna River north of Riga with his army and defeated a Saxon and Russian army under Steinau, who was encamped south of the river.

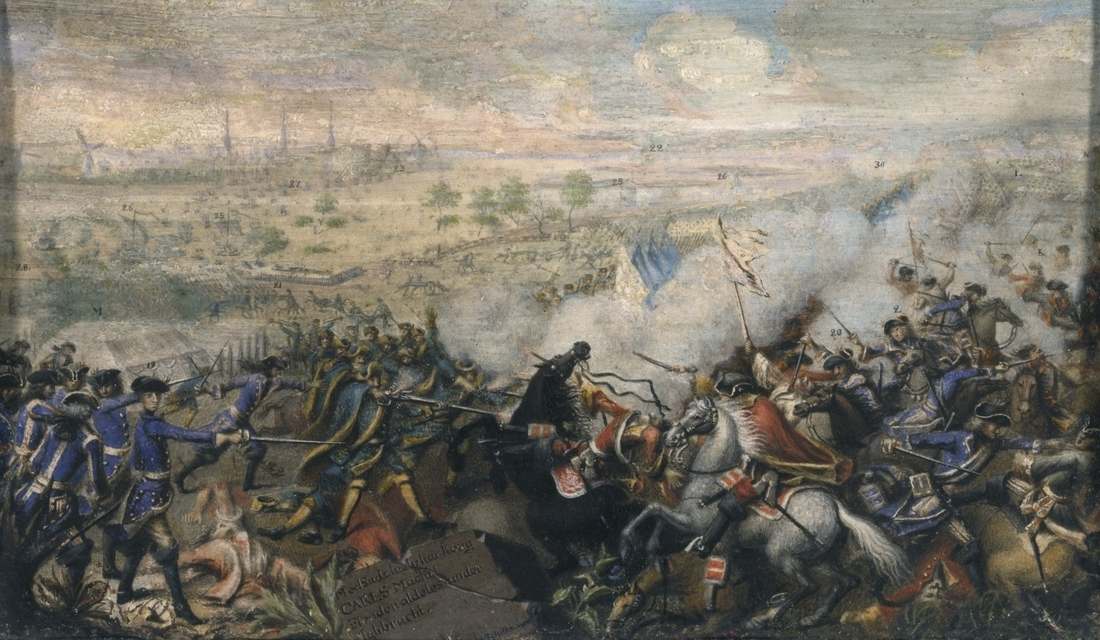
The crossing of the Düna 9 July 1701

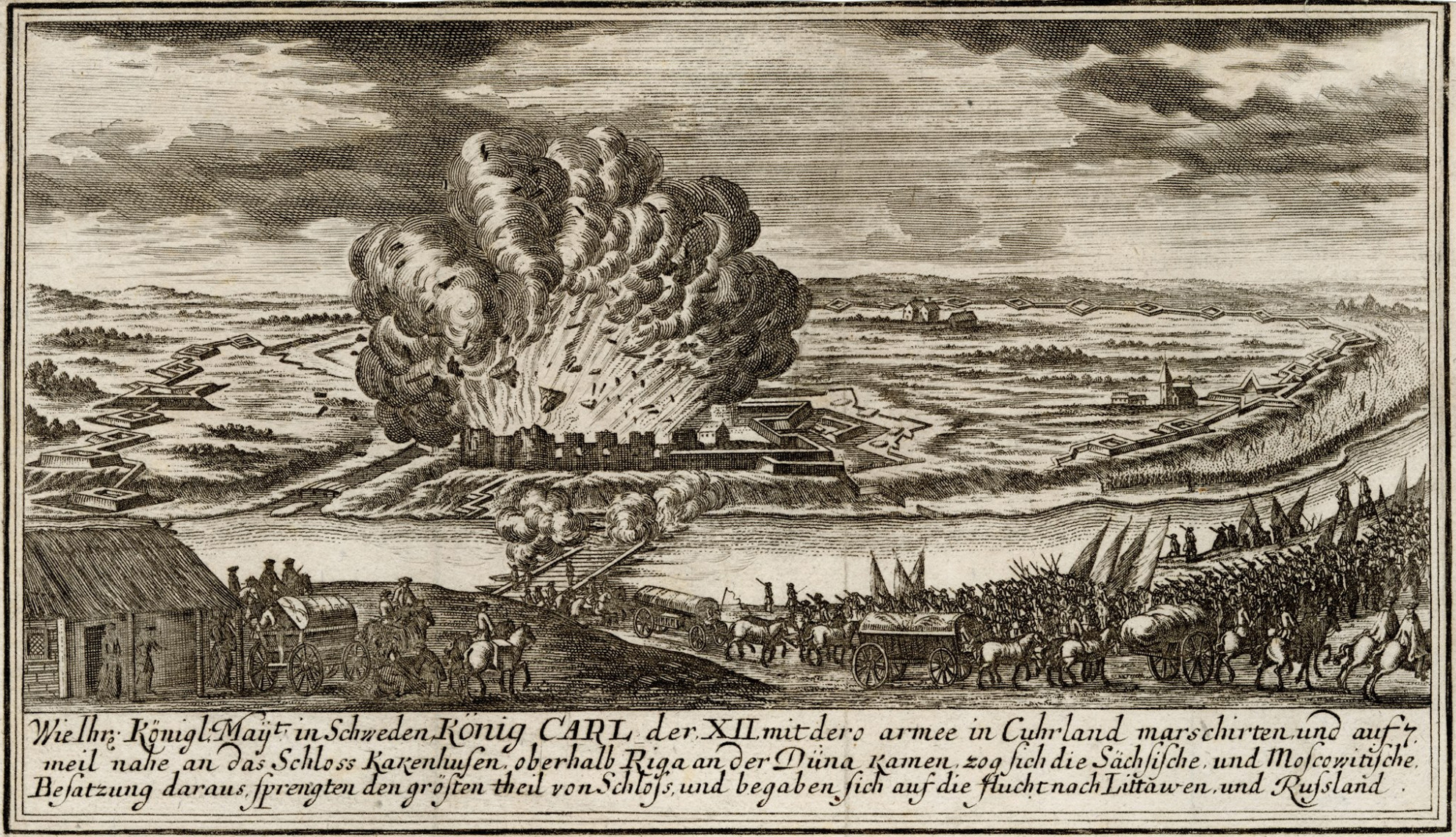
The fortress Koknese Castle at Düna east of Friedrichstadt was captured on 14 July 1701 by the Swedes after the Saxon crew blew up the fortress and fled

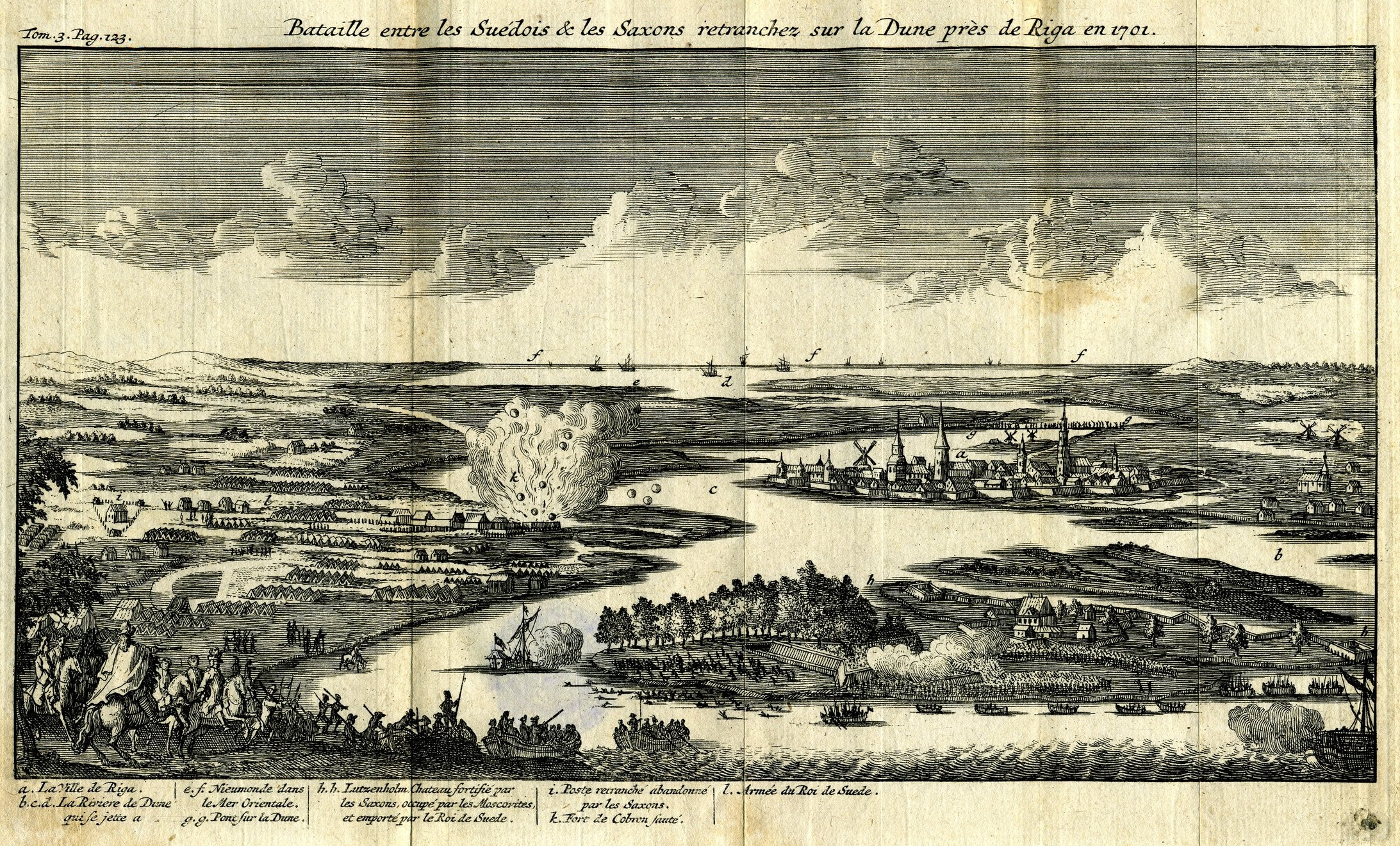
Battle between the Swedes and the entrenched Saxons on the Daugava near Riga in 1701. On the right - the island of Lucavsala

== See also ==
- Charles XII invasion of Poland
- Civil war in Poland (1704-1706)

== Sources ==
=== Bibliography ===
- Olle Larsson, Stormaktens sista krig (2009) Lund, Historiska Media. ISBN 978-91-85873-59-3
- Wolke, Lars Ericson (2003). Svenska slagfält [Swedish battlefields] (in Swedish). Wahlström & Widstrand. ISBN 9789146202257.
- Peter Ullgren, Det stora nordiska kriget 1700–1721 (2008) Stockholm, Prisma. ISBN 978-91-518-5107-5
- Ericson, Sjöslag och rysshärjningar (2011) Stockholm, Norstedts. ISBN 978-91-1-303042-5
- Anders Fryxell, Berättelser ur svenska historien, Volym 21–22 (1861) OCLC 677009765, 677009768
- Gary Dean Peterson, Warrior Kings of Sweden: The Rise of an Empire in the Sixteenth and Seventeenth Centuries (2007). McFarland. ISBN 9780786428731
- Ulf Sundberg, Sveriges krig 1630–1814 (2010) Svenskt Militärhistoriskt Bibliotek. ISBN 9789185789634
- Kuvaja, Christer, Krigen kring Östersjön – Karolinska krigare 1660–1721, Schildts Förlags AB, Helsinki 2008 ISBN 9789515018236
- Alex, Svensson, Karl XII som fältherre, Svenskt Militärhistoriskt Bibliotek, Stockholm 2001 ISBN 9789197405614
