= Battle of Holowczyn =

Major battle in the Great Northern War

- Part of the Swedish invasion of Russia
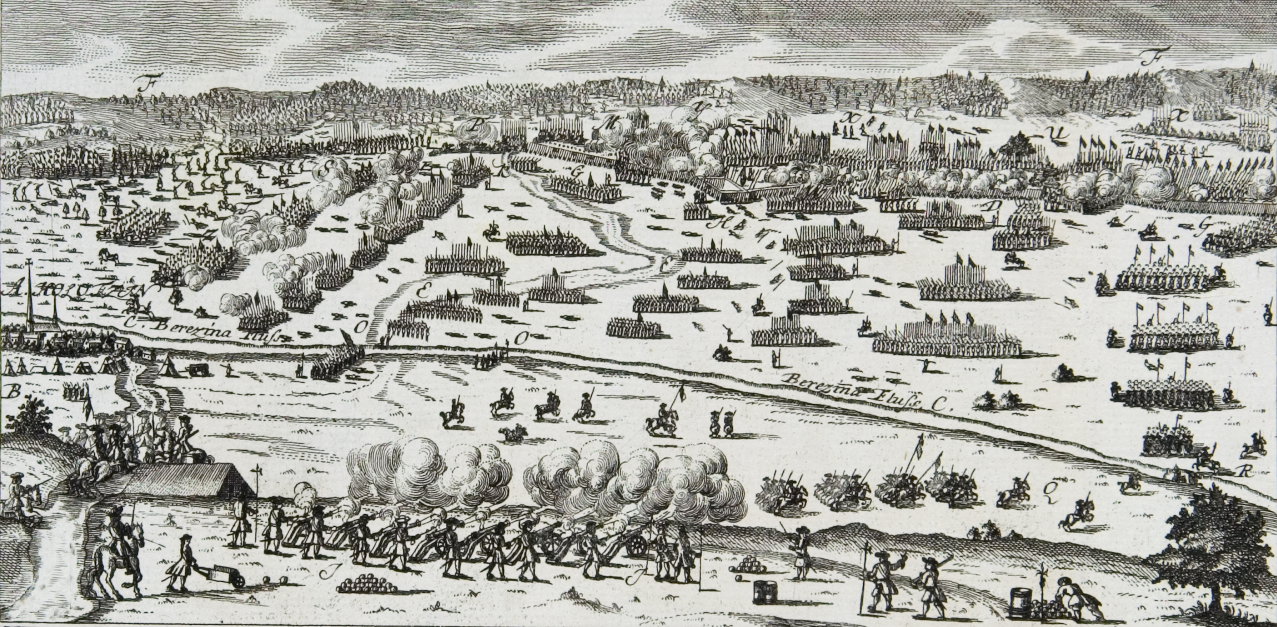
- Battle of Holowczyn 1708, by B. Adlerfeld
Date	3 July 1708 (O.S.); 4 July 1708 (Swedish calendar); 14 July 1708 (N.S.)
Location	Holowczyn, Polish–Lithuanian Commonwealth (present-day Belarus) 54°03′46″N 29°56′05″E
Result	Swedish victory

Belligerents
Swedish Empire	Tsardom of Russia

Commanders and leaders
Charles XII; Carl Gustav Rehnskiöld	Boris Sheremetev; Aleksandr Menshikov; Anikita Repnin

Strength
12,500	28,000–39,000

Casualties and losses
1,293; • 265 killed; • 1,028 wounded	1,655–6,000 (Note: 1,655 (350 killed, 675 wounded and 630 missing); 3,000–5,000; 6,000)

The Battle of Holowczyn (also spelled Holofzin or Golovchin) was fought in July 1708 between the Russian army and the Swedish army, led by Charles XII of Sweden, who was only 26 years of age at the time. Despite difficult natural obstacles and superior enemy artillery, the Swedes were able to achieve surprise and defeat the numerically superior Russian forces, who were separated from each other, had no overall command and could not coordinate their actions, disallowing them an engagement in full force. Reportedly, it was Charles' favourite victory.

== Prelude ==
After dealing with Saxony-Poland, Charles was ready to take on his remaining enemy in the Great Northern War: Russia. The best route into the Russian heartland was along the continental divide from Grodno to Minsk and Smolensk. From there, Moscow could be reached without having to cross any major rivers. Charles chose instead a straighter – but more difficult – route, over the Berezina and Drut rivers. The army was moved from its winter camp near Radoszkowice in June 1708; the movement was plagued by poor road conditions and weather.

The unexpected choice of route made the Russians unsure of the Swedish intentions. In addition, with Peter I of Russia away the Field Marshal Boris Sheremetev had to contend with the rivalry of Alexander Menshikov. After a council of war, it was decided to draw the Russian defence line by the Dnieper River. In June and July the army was moved piecemeal towards Vabich, a marshy tributary of the Drut river. The Russian forces at Holowczyn had an order to defend their position as long as possible and then retreat, avoiding a general battle.

The main force of the Russian army was deployed around the village of Vasilki, east and across the Vabich from Holowczyn. The bridges across Vabich were fortified and defended with artillery. To the south, General Anikita Repnin deployed his force and fortified his position three kilometers to the southeast, but many fortifications were not completed due to a lack of engineers. To the south, General Anikita Repnin, for whom it was the first battle in which he commanded his troops all by himself, deployed his force and hastily fortified his position three kilometers to the southeast. Most of his fortifications were only partially completed, whereas his forces were stretched and vulnerable for a concentrated attack, forming a long and thin line. Between the two fortified camps lay marshy territory that could not be fortified. The Russian commanders did not use cavalry units for reconnaissance, had limited knowledge of the enemy's movements and little contact with each other. Knowing the weakness of their defence, lacking overall command unity and a clear idea of the enemy's location, they lost confidence in themselves shortly before the battle.

The Swedes had observed the Russian deployment along the Vabich. Starting on 30 June, Swedish regiments started bivouacking on the heights west of Holowczyn. Charles and his followers noticed the gap in the fortifications, and decided on a plan of attack. Crossing the marshy area between the two Russian camps would not only be an unsuspected move, but would also serve to divide the enemy force in two. To ensure success, the attack was to be carried out in the darkness of night.

== Battle ==
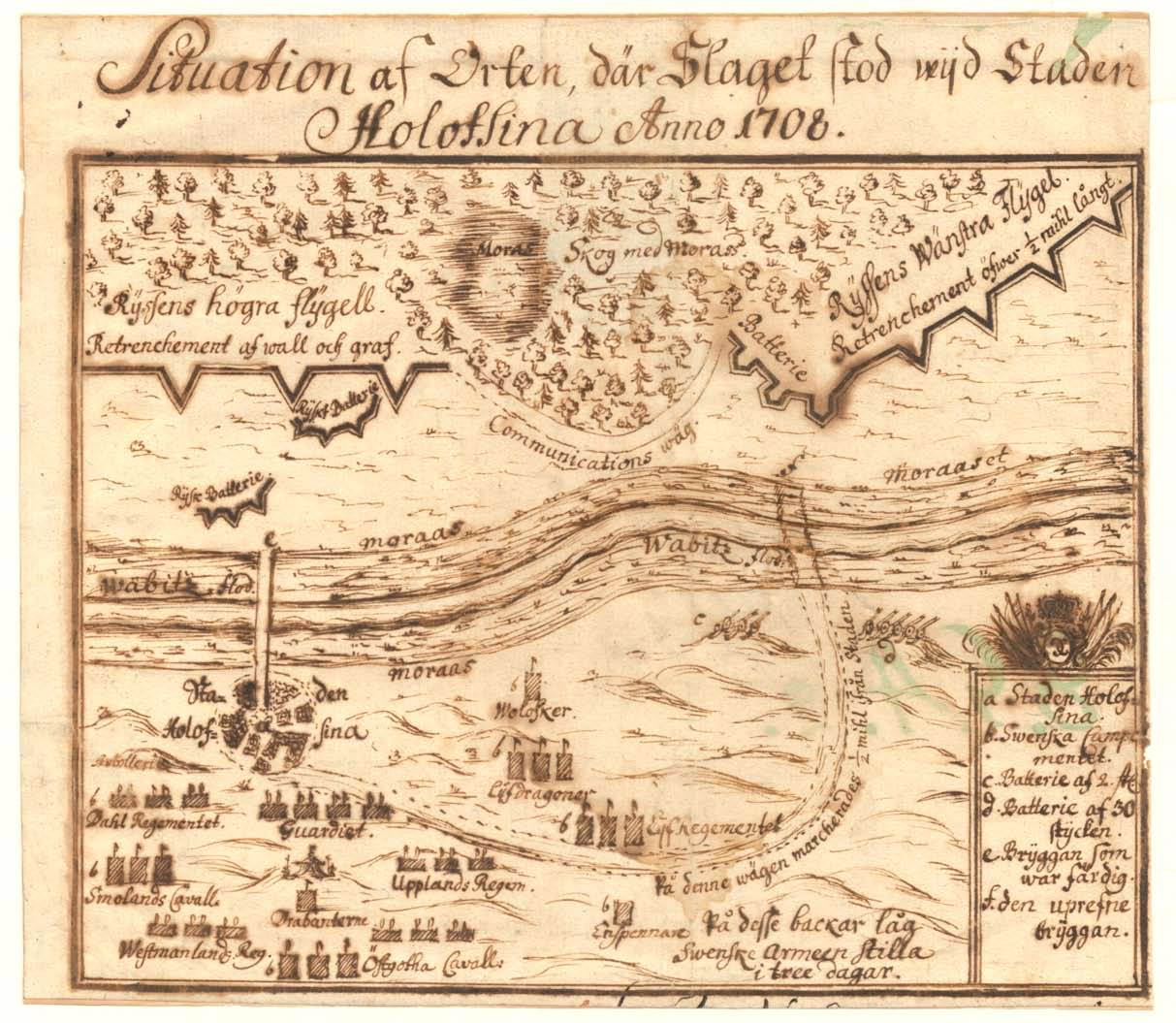
Swedish plan of the battle

At midnight on 4 July the Swedes started moving quietly towards the river. Infantry carried fascines to help them traverse the waterlogged ground before crossing the Vabich on leather pontoon bridges. However, heavy rainfall made the pontoons too heavy to carry; they were left behind. At 02:30 the Russian alarm was raised as Swedish artillery started bombarding the opposite river bank. Swedish success would depend on how many troops could cross the river without the aid of pontoons before the enemy forces could arrive. Charles as so often led the charge personally, by wading across the water in front of his men. After forming with difficulty on the boggy far bank, the Swedes began to advance through the marsh. Meanwhile, fascines were laid on the river banks to assist the cavalry's crossing. Both the engineers and the Swedish vanguard began to be targeted by Repnin's artillery.

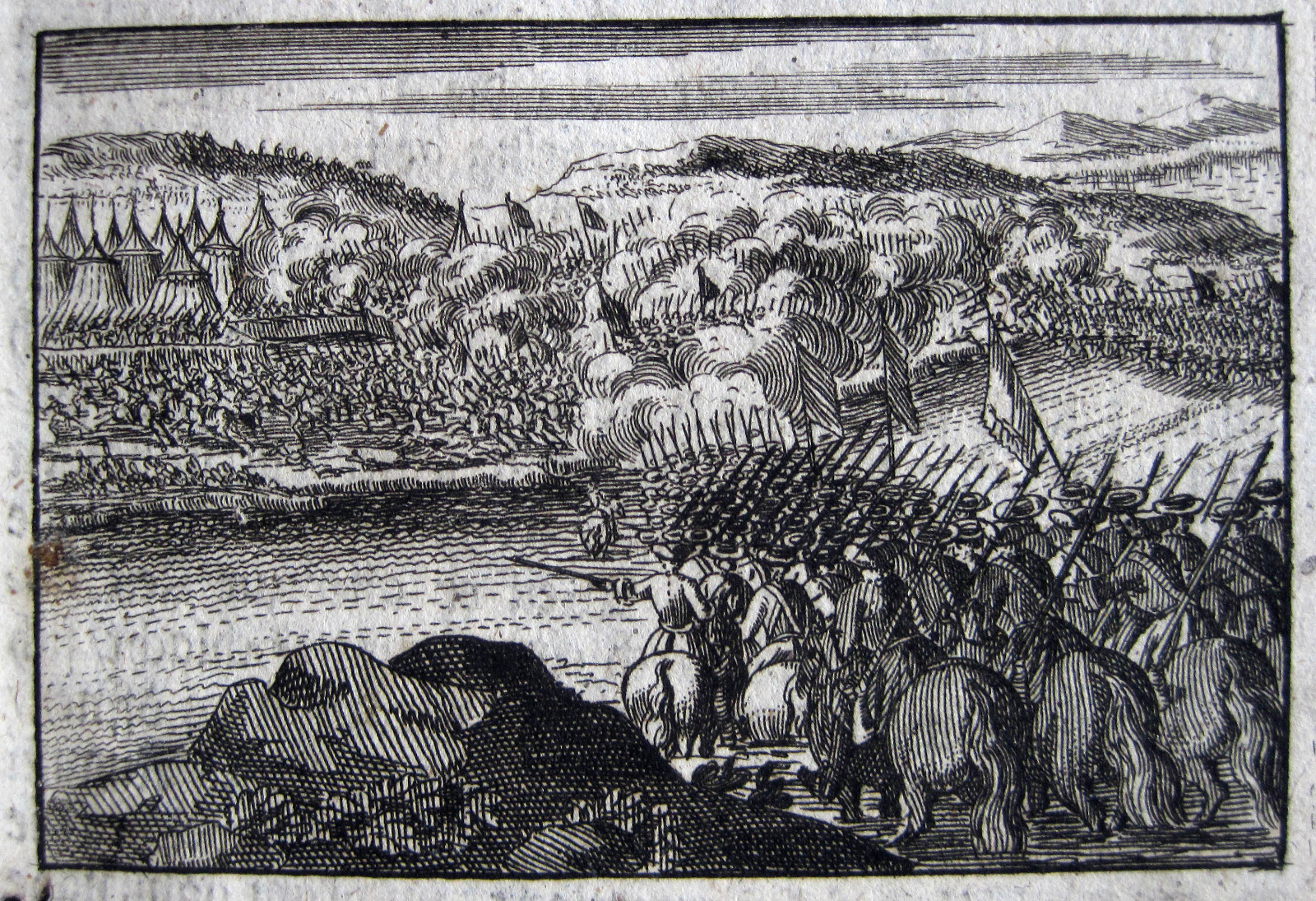
Swedish cavalry crossing the marshes

General Repnin soon saw the danger of a Swedish wedge forming between the two Russian positions, and ordered his men to decamp and head north toward Sheremetev. Five Swedish battalions fought hard to prevent the Russian regiments from merging. Sheremetev, hearing the sound of battle, dispatched reinforcements towards Repnin's position, but by that time enough Swedish forces had arrived to prevent these reinforcements from joining Repnin. The latter was forced to retire his forces eastwards and southwards. Swedish cavalry by now had followed the infantry across the river, and scattered their Russian counterparts towards the south.

At this point, Sheremetev's forces were still waiting across the river from Holowczyn. They had been on full alert for hours, in the belief that the attack on Repnin was a feint and expecting the main Swedish attack to come from Holowczyn. Finally, Sheremetev took the initiative to attack the almost undefended Swedish camp to the west. However, when news of the Repnin's setback reached Sheremetev, he decided not to wait for a Swedish attack on his rear, but instead began retreating towards Shklov by the Dnieper. The Russians were unable to use their numerical superiority and due to Sheremetyev's passivity, only 9,000 took part in the battle.

== Aftermath ==
The victory provided the Swedes with a defensive line along the Dnieper and the area around Mogilev could be used as a base of operations in their campaign against Russia. However, since so many of the Russian troops were able to escape it was not a decisive strategic victory. On the Russian side, Generals Anikita Repnin and Heinrich von der Goltz were put on trial for the lack of coordination between the troops and other mistakes made by the Russian command at Holowczyn, but were released afterwards.

According to official Swedish and Russian reports, the Swedes lost 1,293 men killed and wounded against 1,655 for the Russians. Alexander Gordon, a Russian officer of Scottish descent, however, puts the Russian losses at 2,000 killed, including one otherwise unknown major general and 26 officers more, with an unknown number of wounded. According to Swedish sources, after having seized the battlefield, the Russians had lost up to 5,000 or 6,000 men in the battle and pursuit, while Russian sources in turn estimated a total loss of 2,000 Swedes.
