= Axel Gyllenkrok =

Swedish military officer

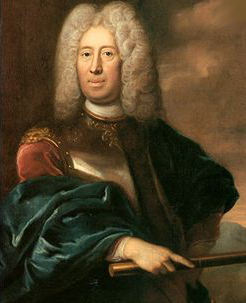
- Axel Gyllenkrok by Georg Engelhard Schröder
- Born: August 2, 1664; Turku, Finland
- Died: 17 September 1730 (aged 66); Svenstorp Castle in Scania, Sweden
- Spouse: Maria Hergadt (m. 1723)
- Children: Fredrik Gustaf Gyllenkrok; Margareta Gyllenkrok
- Military career
- Allegiance: Sweden; France
- Branch: Infantry
- Service years: 1683–1730
- Rank: Lieutenant-General
- Nickname: "Little Vauban"
- Conflicts: Nine Years' War: Siege of Namur; Battle of Steenkerque; Battle of Neerwinden; Siege of Tournay; Siege of Huy; Great Northern War: Landing at Humlebæk; Battle of Narva; Crossing of the Düna; Battle of Kliszów; Siege of Thorn; Battle of Grodno; Battle of Holowczyn; Battle of Poltava

Axel Gyllenkrok, or Gyllenkrook (2 August 1664 – 17 September 1730) was a Swedish baron, military general, and governor of Gothenburg. He is best known as being the general quartermaster of King Charles XII of Sweden. He was the operational planner whose collections of route maps and reports were used by Charles XII to prepare for the campaign in Poland and Russia.

After the King's defeat in the Battle of Poltava (8 July 1709), Gyllenkrok followed the King to the Ottoman Empire. Shortly afterwards, he was captured by the forces of Peter I of Russia at a mission in Poland. He was moved between multiple places during his captivity, including Moscow and Kazan, and did not return to Sweden until 1722 after the signing of the Treaty of Nystad.
