= Torsebro =

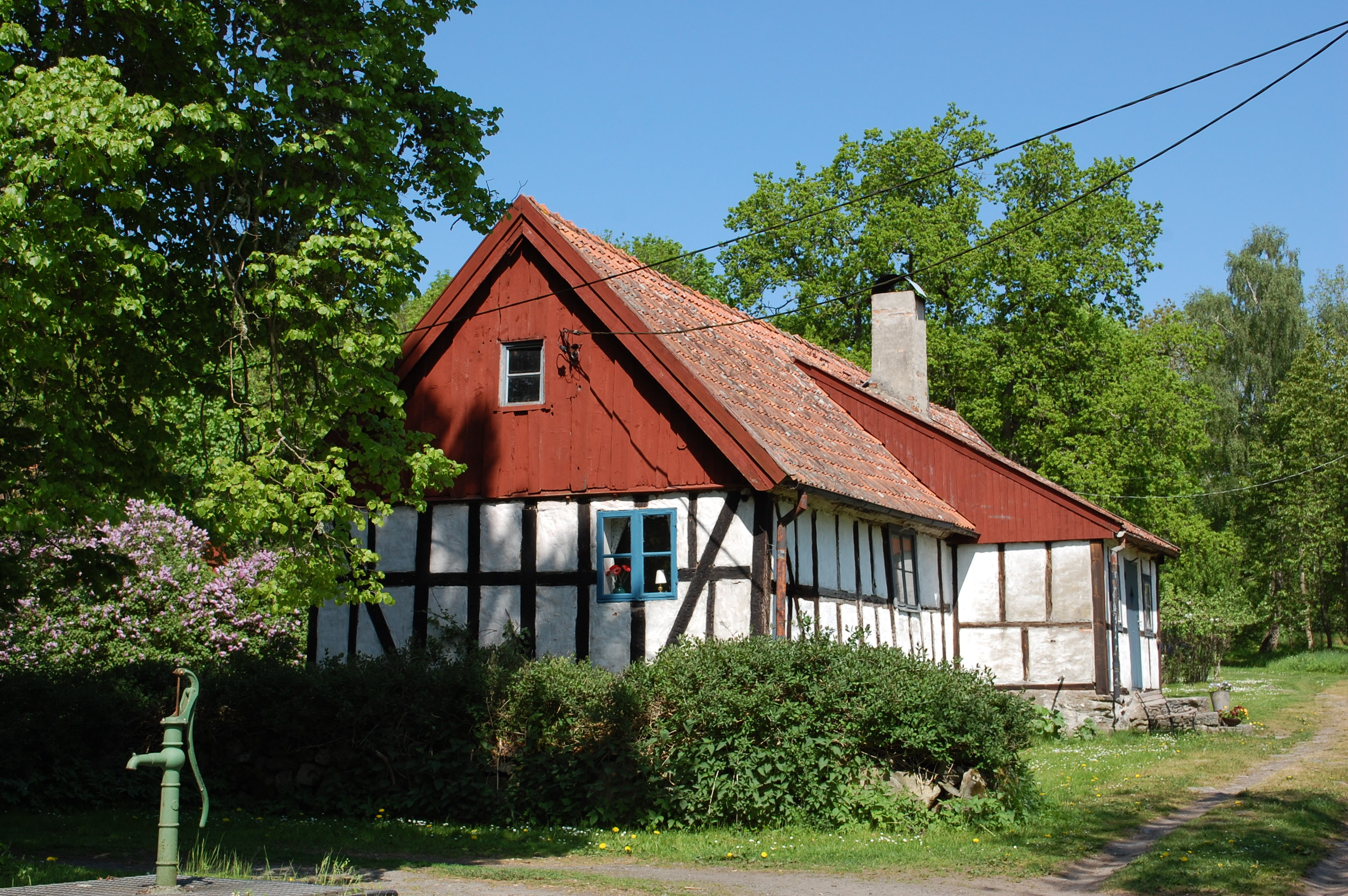
- House in Torsebro

- Location within Skåne Location within Sweden
- Coordinates: 56°06′N 14°07′E
- Country: Sweden
- Province: Skåne
- County: Skåne County
- Municipality: Kristianstad Municipality

Area
  - Total: 0.64 km^{2} (0.25 sq mi)

Population (31 December 2010)
  - Total: 270
  - Density: 422/km^{2} (1,090/sq mi)
- Time zone: UTC+1 (CET)
  - Summer (DST): UTC+2 (CEST)

Torsebro (Swedish pronunciation: [tɔʂɛˈbruː]) is a locality situated in Kristianstad Municipality, Skåne County, Sweden with 270 inhabitants in 2010.
