= Vasilki =

Vasilki Васильки
- Village
- Location within Vladimir Oblast Location within Russia
- Coordinates: 56°06′N 41°57′E
- Country: Russia
- Region: Vladimir Oblast
- District: Vyaznikovsky District
- Time zone: UTC+3:00

Vasilki (Russian: Васильки) is a rural locality (a village) in Posyolok Nikologory, Vyaznikovsky District, Vladimir Oblast, Russia. The population was 9 as of 2010.

== Geography ==
Vasilki is located 27 km southwest of Vyazniki (the district's administrative centre) by road. Zhelnino is the nearest rural locality.
