= Halowchyn =

Coordinates: 54.0583°N 29.9134°E

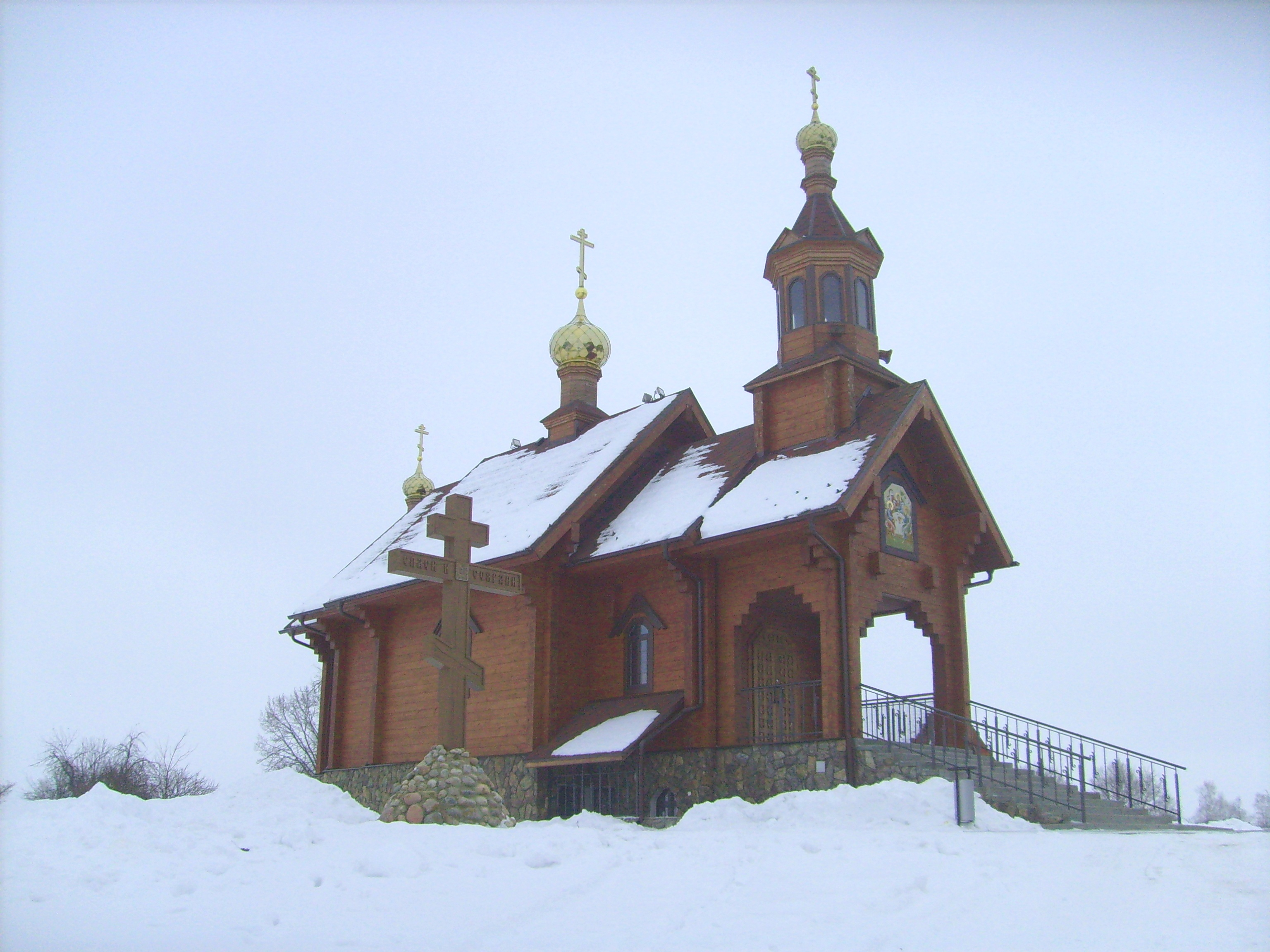
Church in Halowchyn

Halowchyn, also known as Holowczyn or Golovchin (Belarusian: Галоўчын, romanized: Haloŭchyn; Russian: Головчин), is a village in Byalynichy District, Mogilev Region, Belarus.

The total population is 511 inhabitants (2009 census). It is located 18 kilometres (11 mi) northeast of Byalynichy and 26 kilometres (16 mi) from Mogilev.

== History ==
In July 1708, the Battle of Holowczyn was fought between Russian forces (occupying Belarus since 1704/1705), and the Swedish army led by Charles XII of Sweden.

Around 70 Jews used to live in the village before World War II. In October 1941, around 19 Jewish men were shot in a mass execution perpetrated by an Einsatzgruppen. The other Jews were sent to another ghetto, probably in Belynichi.

== Sources ==
- "Головчин" . Brockhaus and Efron Encyclopedic Dictionary (in Russian). 1906.
