= Battle of Kliszów =

Part of the Great Northern War

Coordinates: 50°37′0″N 20°31′33″E

- Part of the Great Northern War
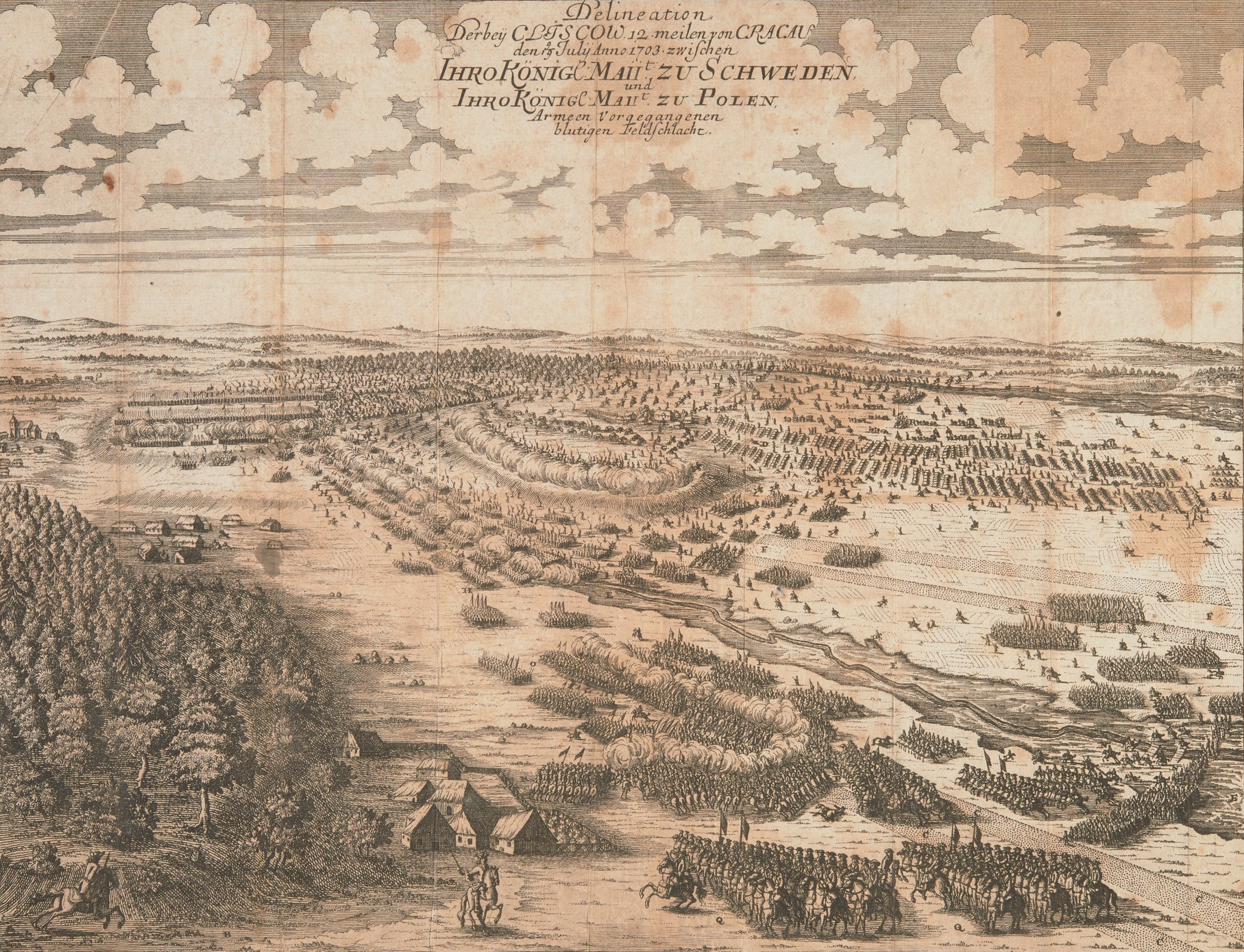
- Contemporary engraving of the battle
Date	19 July 1702 (Note: New Style (Gregorian calendar) date, corresponding to 8 July in the Julian calendar (Old Style) and 9 July in the Swedish calendar)
Location	Near Kliszów, Poland
Result	Swedish victory

Belligerents
Swedish Empire	Saxony; Polish–Lithuanian Commonwealth

Commanders and leaders
(Swedish Empire) Charles XII (Swedish Empire) Rehnskiöld (Swedish Empire) Frederick IV †	(Electorate of Saxony) Augustus II (Electorate of Saxony) Steinau; Lubomirski

Strength
12,000; 4 guns	23,300: 16,500 Saxons; 6,800 Poles; 50 guns

Casualties and losses
1,100: 300 killed, 800 wounded	4,400: 1,800 killed, 900 wounded, 1,700 captured

The Battle of Kliszów (also spelled Klissow or Klezow) took place on 19 July 1702, near the village of Kliszów in the Polish–Lithuanian Commonwealth during the Great Northern War. A Swedish army under the command of King Charles XII of Sweden defeated a Polish–Saxon army twice the size that was led by King Augustus II the Strong.

During the second year of the war, following Swedish victories at Narva and Düna, Charles launched a campaign against the Polish-Lithuanian Commonwealth. In May 1702, Charles captured Warsaw, the Commonwealth's capital, where he received intelligence that Augustus was assembling a large Saxon army in Kraków. Charles chose to pursue Augustus and called for Swedish reinforcements. By July, after minor skirmishes and the arrival of his reinforcements, Charles was ready to attack Augustus's army, which had taken up a strong defensive position at Kliszów.

The battle began on 19 July with the Swedish army attempting to encircle the Saxon right wing. At the same time, the Polish Crown Army arrived to assist Augustus. The Swedish wings withstood attacks by the Saxon–Polish cavalry, which was driven from the battlefield. The Swedish cavalry and infantry were then able to jointly attack the Saxon infantry, which was forced to retreat. Augustus retreated to Sandomierz with his largely-intact army and retained control of large parts of Poland, but his military power was greatly weakened following the battle, which was a tactical and political victory for Charles.

== Background ==
=== Context ===
On 12 February 1700, the Great Northern War began when Augustus II the Strong, King of the Polish–Lithuanian Commonwealth and elector of Saxony, crossed the Düna river with his Saxon troops and laid siege to the city of Riga in Swedish Livonia. At the same time, the Royal Danish Army under King Frederick IV of Denmark invaded the Swedish-allied duchies of Holstein and Gottorp to secure his rear before commencing with the planned invasion of Scania. In September 1700, Russian forces under Tsar Peter I invaded Swedish Ingria and laid siege to Narva in Swedish Estonia. These three nations had secretly agreed on a joint pact to attack the Swedish Empire from three separate fronts and each aimed to win back territories they had lost to Sweden in previous wars. The Swedish Army under the command of King Charles XII of Sweden first repelled the Danish threat. After a successful Swedish landing operation at Humlebæk on Zealand on 25 July 1700, Frederick IV was forced to withdraw from the war on 8 August the same year by signing the Peace of Travendal. On 20 November, the Russians were forced to withdraw to Russia after their crushing defeat by Charles's main army at the Battle of Narva.

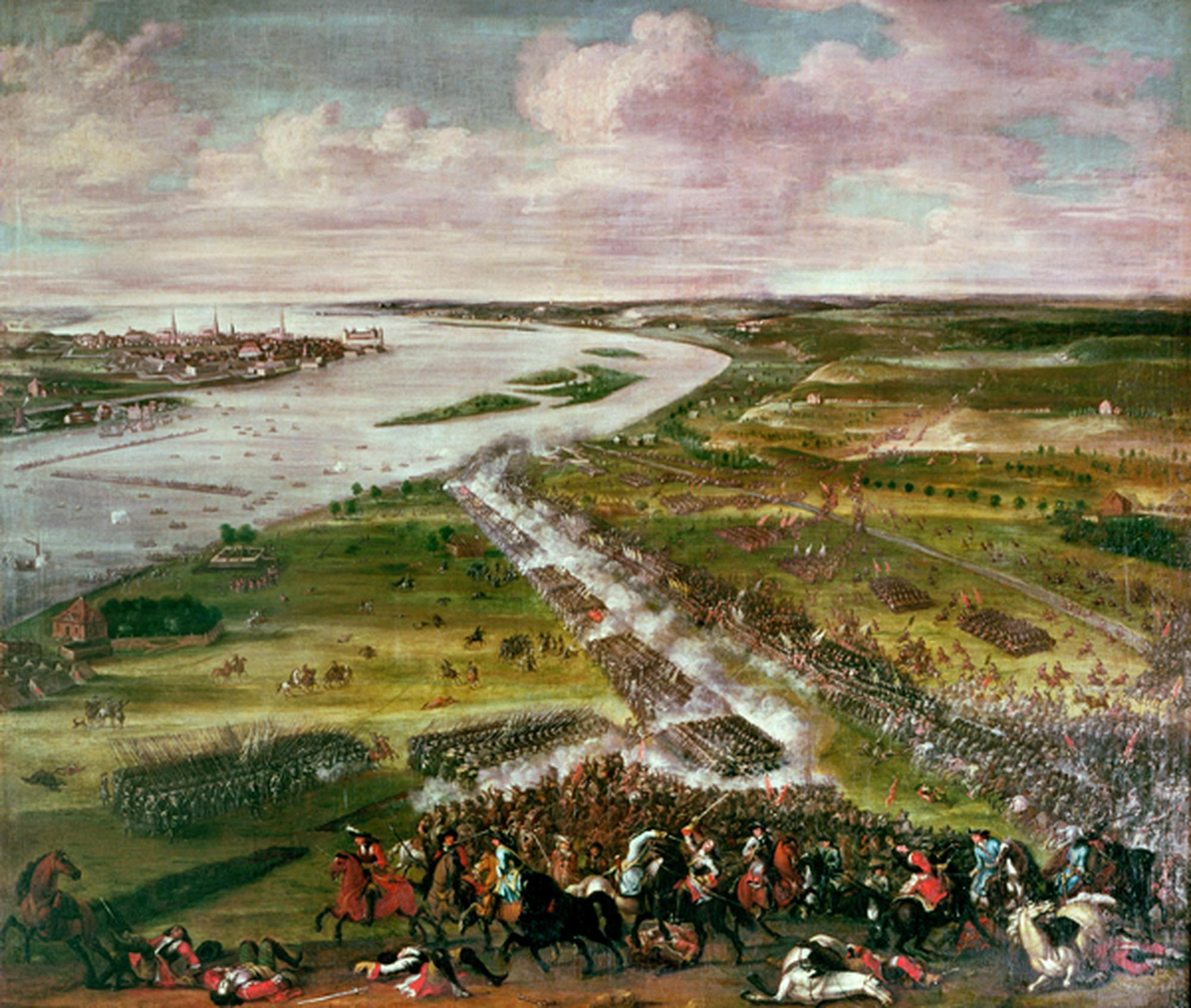
Daniel Stawert, Battle for the Crossing of the Dvina, 1701 (1707), Drottningholm Palace

On his march towards Riga, Charles defeated a Saxon–Russian army at the Battle of Düna on 19 July 1701. The majority of the Saxon–Russian troops under Field Marshal Adam Heinrich von Steinau withdrew from the battle in a relatively orderly fashion, leaving Charles unable to completely defeat Augustus. The Swedish army later crossed the Düna and occupied the Duchy of Courland. Charles then launched a military campaign in Poland to outmaneuver Augustus's troops and depose him as King of Poland before moving against Russia. Several of the king's advisors, including Polish magnates and foreign diplomats, were worried about the king's war plans, especially his plan to depose Augustus. The Polish–Lithuanian Commonwealth was still neutral in the conflict because Augustus had attacked Swedish Livonia in his capacity as elector of Saxony and not as King of Poland.

=== Swedish invasion of Poland ===
At the beginning of February 1702, Charles marched into the Grand Duchy of Lithuania with 14,000 men. He left 25,000 men in Sweden's Baltic dominions; they were distributed to different garrisons without a common leadership, and another 4,000 men were in Courland under the command of Major General Carl Magnus Stuart. On 29 March 1702, Charles left Lithuania and marched with his main army towards Warsaw, the Commonwealth's capital. Both Augustus and the Commonwealth's main representative Cardinal Primate Michał Stefan Radziejowski left Warsaw, leaving Charles to enter the city unopposed on May 14. There, he had unsuccessful negotiations with Polish noble factions who were in opposition to Augustus. He then received intelligence that Augustus had fled to Kraków, where he gathered his Saxon troops. On May 24, Charles sent orders to General Nils Gyllenstierna in Swedish Pomerania to immediately advance with 10,000 men towards Kraków. On 2 June, Charles gave orders to Major Generals Carl Mörner and Magnus Stenbock with their 4,000 men from Vilnius in Lithuania, and to Major General Georg Johan Maidel with his troops in Courland, to return to the main Swedish army. Maidel, however, reported he was unable to move his troops until 17 June and was therefore far away from Charles's army. The king received a similar report from Gyllenstierna, whose troops remained in Stettin, whereupon the king decided not to wait for Gyllenstierna.

On 16 June, Charles marched out of Warsaw with four cavalry regiments and four infantry regiments, totaling 8,000 men, leaving a few thousand men to form a garrison in the city. During the march, the king dispatched Lieutenant Colonel Axel Gyllenkrok with 500 cavalry and 300 infantry to collect supplies for the maintenance of the main Swedish army. He also sent repeated messages to Mörner to order his troops to immediately cross the Vistula river and reunite with him. On the day of his departure from Warsaw, the king encamped at Tarczyn on the road to Kraków. He then continued on through Grójec and Łęczeszyce, and camped for a few days in Nowe Miasto nad Pilicą. The march then continued via Drzewica and Gowarczów to Radoszyce, where he camped for a few days. On 1 July, Charles received a report from Gyllenkrok, who was having difficulty providing sufficient supplies. The king moved his army west toward the city of Kielce in Lesser Poland, where his troops would be well supplied and he could more easily make contact with Mörner's and Stenbock's troops. Stenbock arrived at Lublin on 26 June, after which they crossed the Vistula at Kazimierz Dolny on 29 June. At Wierzbica on 5 July, Mörner and Stenbock had an unexpected meeting with Charles, who had ridden the 160 kilometres (99 mi) from Kielce in two days to give them oral directions for the march to his camp. The king then returned to his troops on 6 July and ordered them to withdraw to the south.

Augustus received intelligence of Charles's approach and Lieutenant General Jacob Heinrich von Flemming urged him to march north with a large army and defeat Charles before he could unite with Gyllenstierna's troops. On 2 July, after receiving news of Gyllenstierna's decampment from Stettin, Augustus marched out of Kraków with a Saxon army of 15,000 men. On 6 July, he encamped at the village of Kliszów, about 30 km (19 mi) south of Kielce. Later on 8 July, he received word the Crown Army under Hetman Hieronim Augustyn Lubomirski was on the march only 10 km (6.2 mi) from Kliszów.

=== Prelude ===
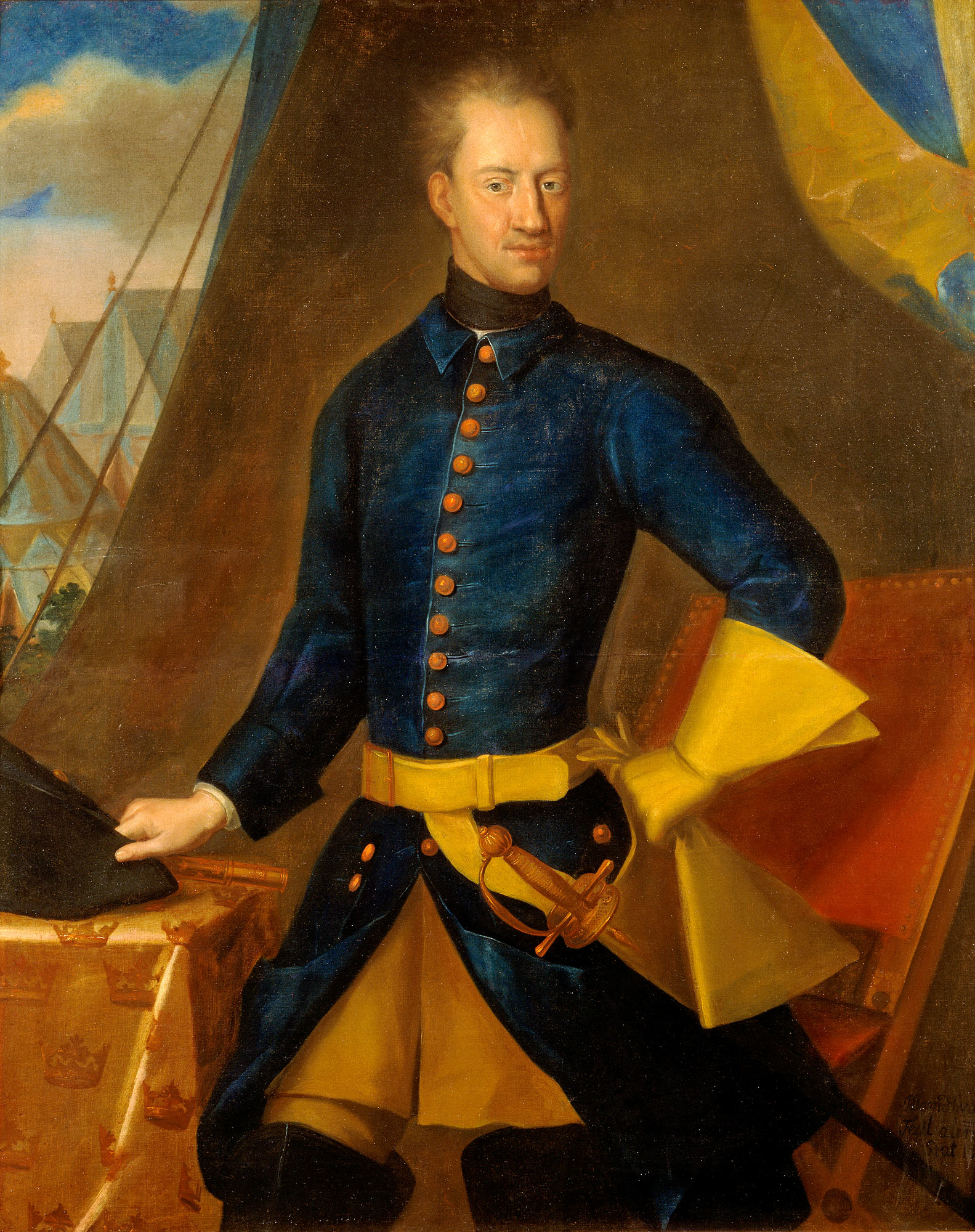
Charles XII of Sweden

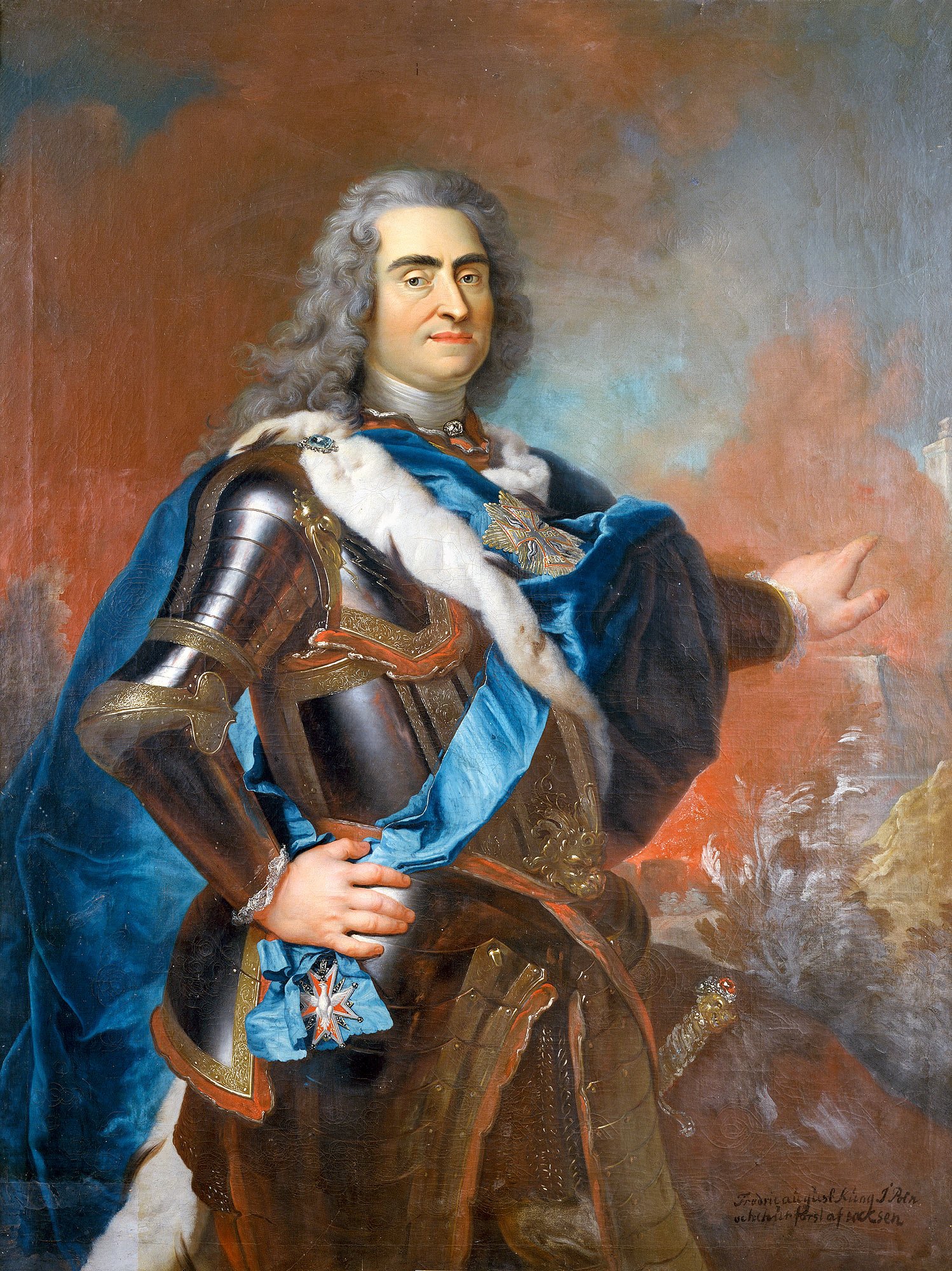
Augustus II the Strong of Poland

On 7 July, Charles and the main Swedish army arrived at the village of Obice, 8 km (5.0 mi) north of Kliszów. On 2 July, the king had detached Colonel Johan August Meijerfeldt, who with 600 cavalry was to reconnoitre the Saxon positions at Pińczów 12 km (7.5 mi) south of Kliszów. On his way there, a cavalry force of 200 Cossacks and Wallachians ambushed Meijerfeldt in a forest near Obice. The attack was repulsed by thirty Swedish dragoons under Captain Tomas Funck, and the ambushers retreated with heavy casualties. Meijerfeldt returned to Charles on 5 July and made a report on the incident. The king contemplated launching a surprise attack against Augustus on the morning of 8 July but on the advice of Lieutenant General Carl Gustav Rehnskiöld, he decided to wait another day for Mörner's and Stenbock's troops to arrive at his camp.

On the morning of 8 July, Ryttmästare Carl Gustaf Örnestedt's outposts near the army's field camp at Obice were attacked by 200 Saxon soldiers and about 100 Wallachians under Major General von Brause, whom Augustus had ordered to gather intelligence about the Swedes' location. Örnestedt repelled the attack and the Saxons' losses were about 20 killed or wounded, and either eight or nine captured. Among the Swedes, Ryttmästare Gustaf Fägerskiöld and some of the horsemen died. After receiving the alarming report, the king immediately went there to survey the previous skirmish. That evening, Mörner's and Stenbock's troops arrived at the royal camp, ending their five-week-long expedition from Vilnius. Their troops were largely exhausted, several men were sick, and their horses were starved as a result of their forced marches. The troops slept for a few hours before they were ordered to line up the following morning.

On the morning of 9 July, on the anniversary of the Battle of Düna, a false rumor the Saxon army were on the move spread around the Swedish camp. At 06:00, Charles ordered his troops to conduct a mass and issue the battle cry "With God's help". Then, the troops were ordered to march out and divide themselves into four marching columns. They moved south toward Kliszów under the cover of a large forest and intermediate heights. Steps were taken to give the impression it was only a small reconnaissance force rather than the whole army on the march, and the troops were ordered to march with lowered weapons and banners. Saxon reconnaissance patrols at the western edge of the forest sighted some Swedish units, whom they thought were part of the rearguard sent to mask a large Swedish retreat. When the Swedes arrived at a field outside the southern edge of the forest, Charles sighted the Saxon positions near Kliszów, wheeled right and arranged his troops in the order of battle. At 10:00, the Saxon troops sighted Charles's army; Augustus sounded the alarm with two cannon shots and prepared his troops for battle.

== Battlefield ==
Topographical map of the battlefield area

The site of the upcoming battle was situated 30 km (19 mi) south of Kielce and 75 km (47 mi) northeast of Kraków, in an area dominated by wetlands, oak forests and hills. The battlefield was surrounded by small villages including Rebów in the west; Kliszów and Kokot in the south; Kije, Lipnik and Wymoslów in the east; and Górki, Wierzbica and Borczyn in the north. The Swedes made their field camp at Obice north of their later rallying point at Borczyn, both of which were separated by the large forest the Swedes used to cover their advance. The Saxon camp was located just east of Kliszów. The Nida river flowed through a large swamp just west of Kliszów. The Hajdaszek forest was located south of Kliszów and Kokot. The Saxon army used the river and the forest as flank protection. To the east of Rebów and Kliszów, and in front of the Saxon field camp, was Kulaki Height, a sloping hill about 220 m (720 ft) high. Its front was protected by a marshy stream that ran from the Nida. The Saxons had dug both trenches and moats around the hill. They placed their artillery on its summit and chevaux de frise on its slopes. The Saxon center stood between the artillery and the camp. The left wing was placed on a ridge behind Rebów while the right wing was placed in front of Kokot facing northeast.

== Order of battle ==
=== Swedish army ===
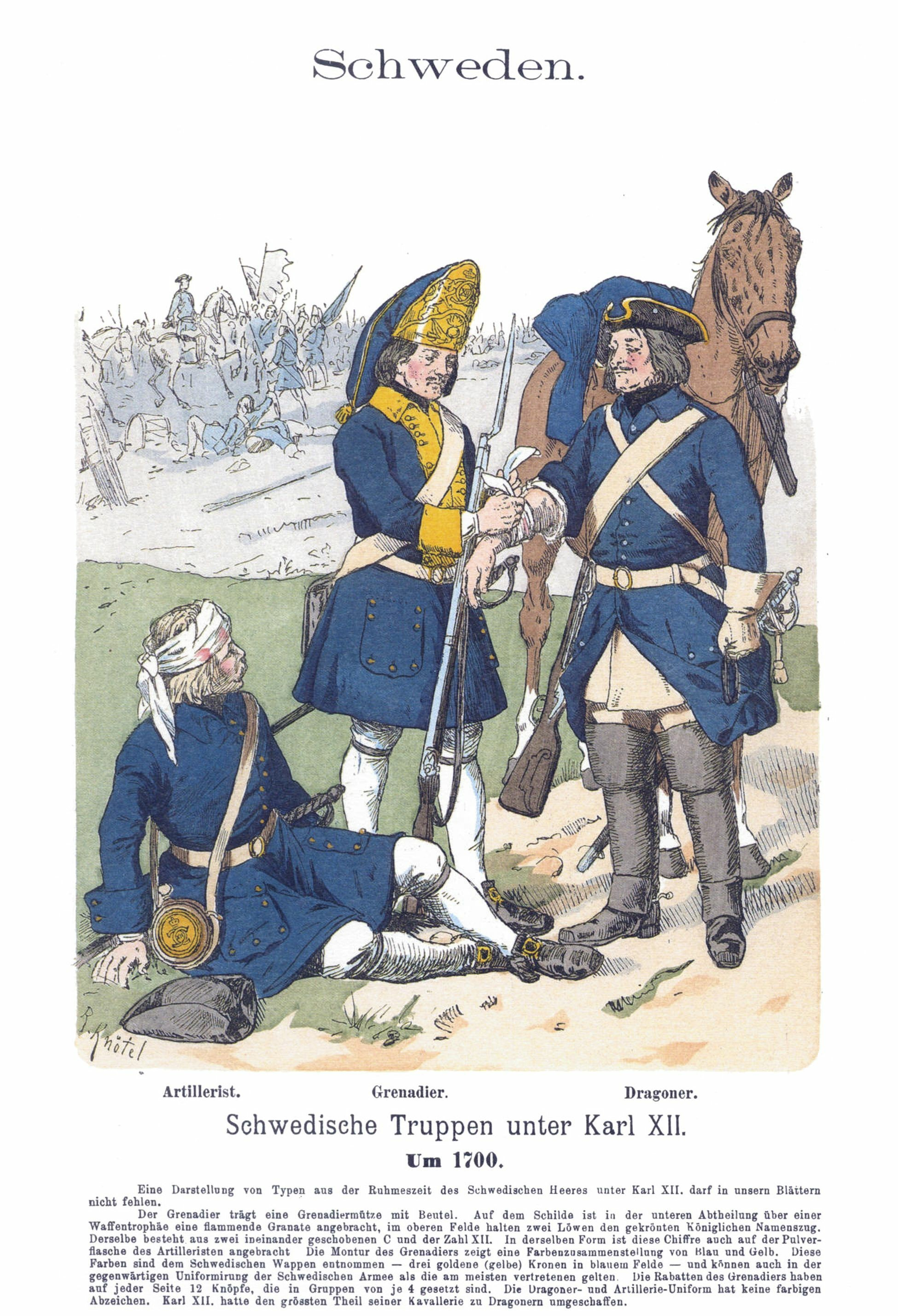
Swedish caroleans

The Swedish army prior to the battle had an official strength of 16,230 men, with four four–pounder regimental guns. Though due to famine, disease, and exhaustion, only between 10,000 and 12,000 of these men were fit for combat. The fighting force consisted of 8,000 infantry distributed between 18 infantry battalions, and 25 cavalry squadrons, and 12 dragoon squadrons totaling 4,000 men. The troops were deployed in two lines in front of Borczyn, with infantry in the center and cavalry on both wings. The first line consisted of 25 squadrons and 12 battalions, and the second line had 15 squadrons and 6 battalions.

Charles took command of the Swedish right cavalry wing of 21 squadrons, with Lieutenant General Rehnskiöld as his second-in-command. The first cavalry line under the command of Major General Mörner consisted of the Drabant Corps squadron under Major General Arvid Horn, the Life Regiment on Horse's seven squadrons under Major Carl Gustaf Creutz; the Life Dragoon Regiment's three squadrons under Colonel Hugo Johan Hamilton and Östergötland Cavalry Regiment' four squadrons under Lieutenant Colonel Jacob Burensköld. The second cavalry line under the command of Lieutenant General Jakob Spens consisted of three Life Regiment squadrons under Ryttmästare Peter Wetzler and four Östergötland squadrons under Major Starkenfelt. The Swedish left cavalry wing of nineteen squadrons was under the command of Frederick IV, Duke of Holstein-Gottorp, with cavalry General Otto Vellingk as his second-in-command. The first cavalry line under the command of Alexander Stromberg consisted of the Life Regiment on Horse; the Life Dragoon Regiment; the Southern Scanian Cavalry Regiment's six squadrons under Lieutenant Colonel Johan Ridderschantz; and the Småland Cavalry Regiment's three squadrons under Lieutenant Colonel Johan Stålhammar. The second cavalry line under the command of Major General Carl Nieroth consisted of two Scanian squadrons and five Småland squadrons, both under Major Mörner.

The Swedish center's 17 battalions consisted of the Svea Life Guards's four battalions under Major General Knut Posse, the Dalarna Regiment's two battalions under Lieutenant Colonel Gustaf Henrik von Siegroth and Captain Carl Svinhufvud, the Kalmar Regiment's two battalions under Colonel Gustaf Ranck and Lieutenant Colonel Erik Silfversparre, the Närke-Värmland Regiment's two battalions under Colonel Carl Gustaf Roos and Lieutenant Colonel Johan Cronman, the Uppland Regiment's two battalions under Lieutenant Colonel von Holst and Major Carl Ludvig von Post, the Västerbotten Regiment's two battalions under Colonel Reinhold Johan von Fersen and Major Lars Björnhufvud, the Västmanland Regiment's two battalions under Colonel Axel Sparre and Lieutenant Colonel Mathias Fredrik von Feilitzen, and one battalion from the Östergötland Reserve Infantry Regiment under Lieutenant Colonel Claes Ekeblad. Lieutenant General Bernhard von Liewen commanded the center, with Major General Stenbock in charge of the first line and Major General Posse in charge of the second line. The Swedish baggage train was protected by 100 dragoons from Henrik Otto Albedyll's Dragoon Regiment under Major Johan Reinhold von Trautvetter and a battalion from Uppland Reserve Infantry Regiment under Nils Hammarhjelm.

=== Saxon–Polish army ===
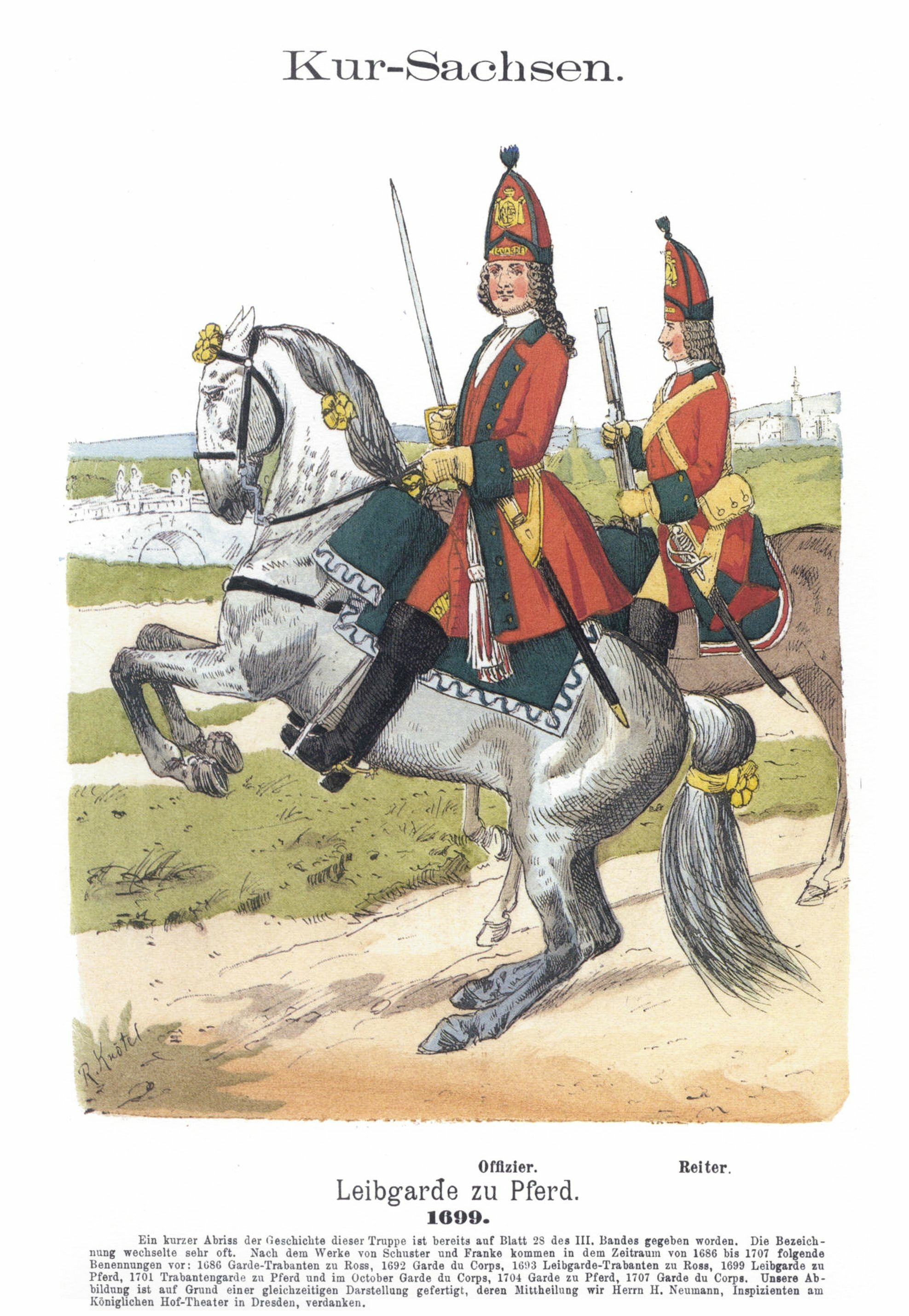
Saxon reiter

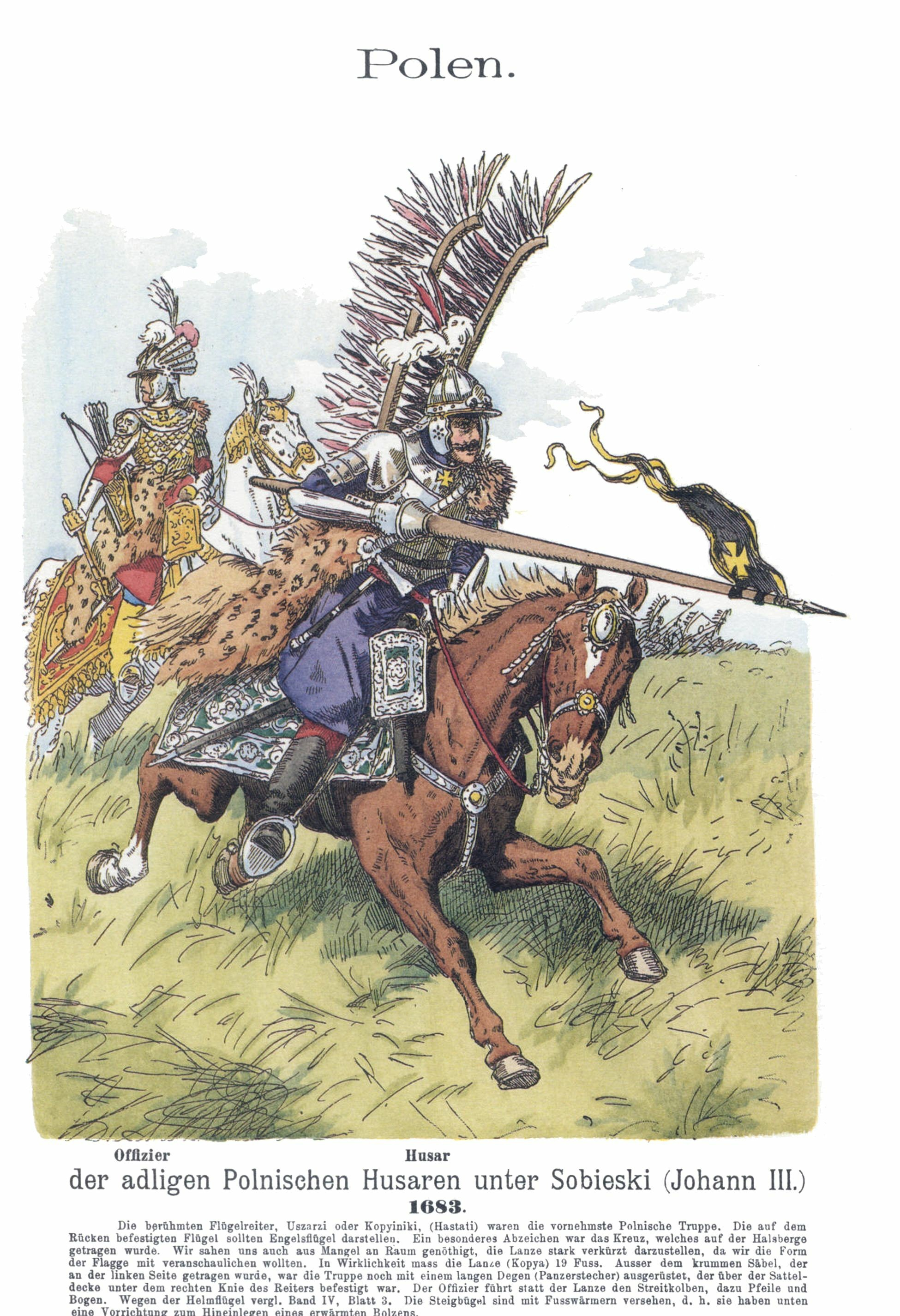
Polish hussar

The Saxon army in the battle had an official strength of 22,230 men and an effective fighting strength of 16,500 men. The fighting force consisted of 7,145 infantry distributed between 16 battalions, and 44 cavalry squadrons and 24 dragoon squadrons totaling 9,000 men. The Saxons had 355 artillerymen operating 46 artillery pieces, about half of which were heavy 12-pounder guns and the rest were four-pounder regimental guns. The Saxon–Polish army thus had numerical superiority in both cannons and cavalry. The army was under the command of Augustus. The Saxon left wing was under Field Marshal Steinau with Danish Major General Adam Fredrik von Trampe in charge of the first line and Major General Francuz de Plessis in charge of the second line. The center was commanded by Lieutenant General Johann Matthias von der Schulenburg, who was supported by Major Generals Denhoff, Venediger and Ostromirski. The right wing was under the command of Lieutenant General Flemming, with Major General Marschewitz in charge of the first line and Major General von Beust in charge of the second line. The Crown Army, which was under the command of Hetman Lubomirski, was also placed on the right wing.

The Saxon center's 16 battalions were formed on the first line by the four battalions of the Saxon and Polish Guards under Stanisław Ernest Denhoff, two battalions of the Elector's Regiment, two battalions of Wolf Dietrich von Beichlingen's Regiment, and two battalions of the Queen's Regiment; and on the second line by two battalions of Steinau's Regiment, Görtz regiment's two battalions, and Pistori's regiment's two battalions. The right cavalry wing consisted of about 3,000 men made up of the Life Guard on Horse's 10 squadrons, the Life Dragoon Regiment's six squadrons, the Joachim R. Goltz Dragoon Regiment's six squadrons, the Elector's Cuirassier Regiment's six squadrons, and the Eichstädt Cuirassier Regiment's six squadrons. The left cavalry wing consisted of about 4,000 men, made up of Steinau's Cuirassier Regiment's six squadrons, Carl G. Jordan's Cuirassier Regiment's six squadrons, the Queen's Cuirassier Regiment's six squadrons, the Horse Life Guard's four squadrons, Milkau's Dragoon Regiment's six squadrons, and the Crown Prince's Dragoon Regiment's six squadrons.

The Polish Crown Army had an official strength of about 12,000 men but at least a third of these were civilians and not combat personnel, making the actual strength between 6,000 and 8,000 men, mainly cavalry. The Polish fighting force consisted of between 1,350 and 1,450 winged hussars, between 4,000 and 4,200 cavalry, between 560 and 600 infantry, and 159 artillerymen. The cavalry consisted of around 5,900 to 6,200 men. Together with the Polish infantry and artillery with four of five guns, the Crown Army had between 6,500 and 6,800 men. It was divided between 11 cavalry regiments and 109 squadrons: King Augustus, Prince August, Hetman Lubomirski, Adam Mikołaj Sieniawski, Karol Stanisław Radziwiłł, Marcin Kątski, Rafał Leszczyński, Atanazy Miączyński, Stefan Aleksander Potocki, and Jan Sobieski each had a cavalry regiment with nine squadrons; Jerzy Dominik Lubomirski's cavalry regiment had eight squadrons, and the Wallachian Cavalry Regiment had 13 squadrons. The Polish infantry consisted of Lubomirski's Hungarian Infantry Regiment and mercenaries under the command of Marcin Kątski, General of Artillery. The first line consisted of 12 squadrons or 2,600 cavalry under Lubomirski's command and the second line had 14 squadrons or 3,000 men under Hetman Sieniawski. The Polish guns and infantry were placed in the middle of both cavalry lines.

== Battle ==
=== Arrival of the Crown Army ===
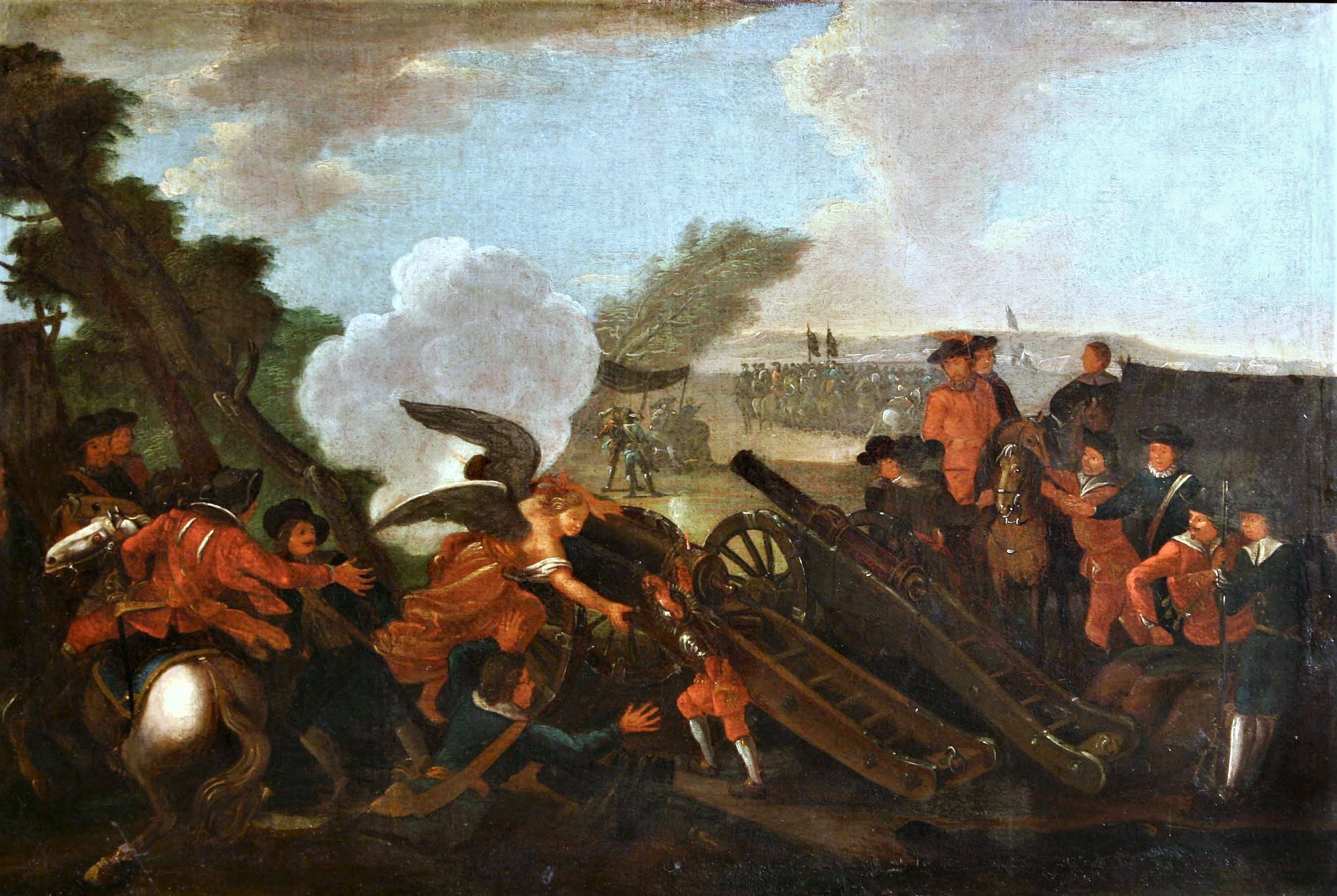
Battle of Kliszów by an unknown 18th century artist, (Polish Army Museum)

Charles's initial intention was to carry out a frontal assault against the Saxon infantry on Kulaki Height, but a reconnaissance of the wetlands in front of the Saxons' advantageous position indicated performing such a maneuver would be very difficult. To bypass the morass, he decided to pivot the entire Swedish army to the left. The army was to march up the slope near the village of Wierzbica, which they would use as a starting point in both their attack and their attempt to encircle the Saxon right wing. The Saxons intended to attack the Swedes from two sides during their approach: the left wing was to cross Rebów to attack the Swedish right wing while the Saxon infantry would advance northward towards Borczyn. The right wing would face the Swedish encirclement. Shortly thereafter, the Swedish army saw the Crown Army suddenly appear beyond the village of Kije, positioning themselves next to the Saxon right wing. The ongoing Swedish pivot maneuver became vulnerable to a Saxon–Polish pincer maneuver; their combined troops now consisted of about 9,000 cavalry against only 2,000 in the Swedish left wing.

=== Swedish regroupment ===
This sudden development forced Charles to halt his troops, transfer the command of the Swedish right wing to Rehnskiöld, and relocate himself to the weak Swedish left wing. There, he organized a cavalry front that would confront the Crown Army and called for infantry support from the Swedish center to protect the left wing from inevitable Polish cavalry attacks. Under Stenbock's command, the Swedish infantry was regrouped, and nine battalions from the Dalarna, Kalmar, Närke-Värmland, Uppland, and Västmanland regiments rushed into the widened gaps between the squadrons in the left wing. The king also ordered the Västerbotten Regiment and Uppland Reserve Regiment to move between the gaps in the Swedish right wing. At the same time, the Crown Army squeezed in and obscured the view of the Saxon right wing south of Kokot, causing the Saxons to have insufficient room to launch their own attack. These movements took around 30 minutes to execute, during which time the Saxon–Polish artillery fired their guns at the Swedes at a distance of 1,500 meters (4,900 ft) with limited effect. The Swedish regimental guns returned fire.

=== Action at the Swedish left wing ===
The reinforced Swedish left wing sought to confront the expected Polish attack. Shortly before 14:00, the left cavalry wing under Duke Frederick IV advanced against the Crown Army. At the beginning of the march, the duke was hit in the lower back by a Saxon falconet shot and the advance halted. The duke was escorted to a nearby oak grove and died there a few hours later. The command of the entire left wing was transferred to Vellingk. The Swedish cavalry were forced to give way to 600 winged hussars, who immediately charged towards the Swedish battalions lined up in the gaps between the Swedish squadrons. According to Vellingk:

At first, in pretty good order against our own, they held their ground against the first volley of our infantry. But after the second volley, they could no longer endure the fire. They quickly fell back before our own could advance, and ultimately escaped from our eyesight.

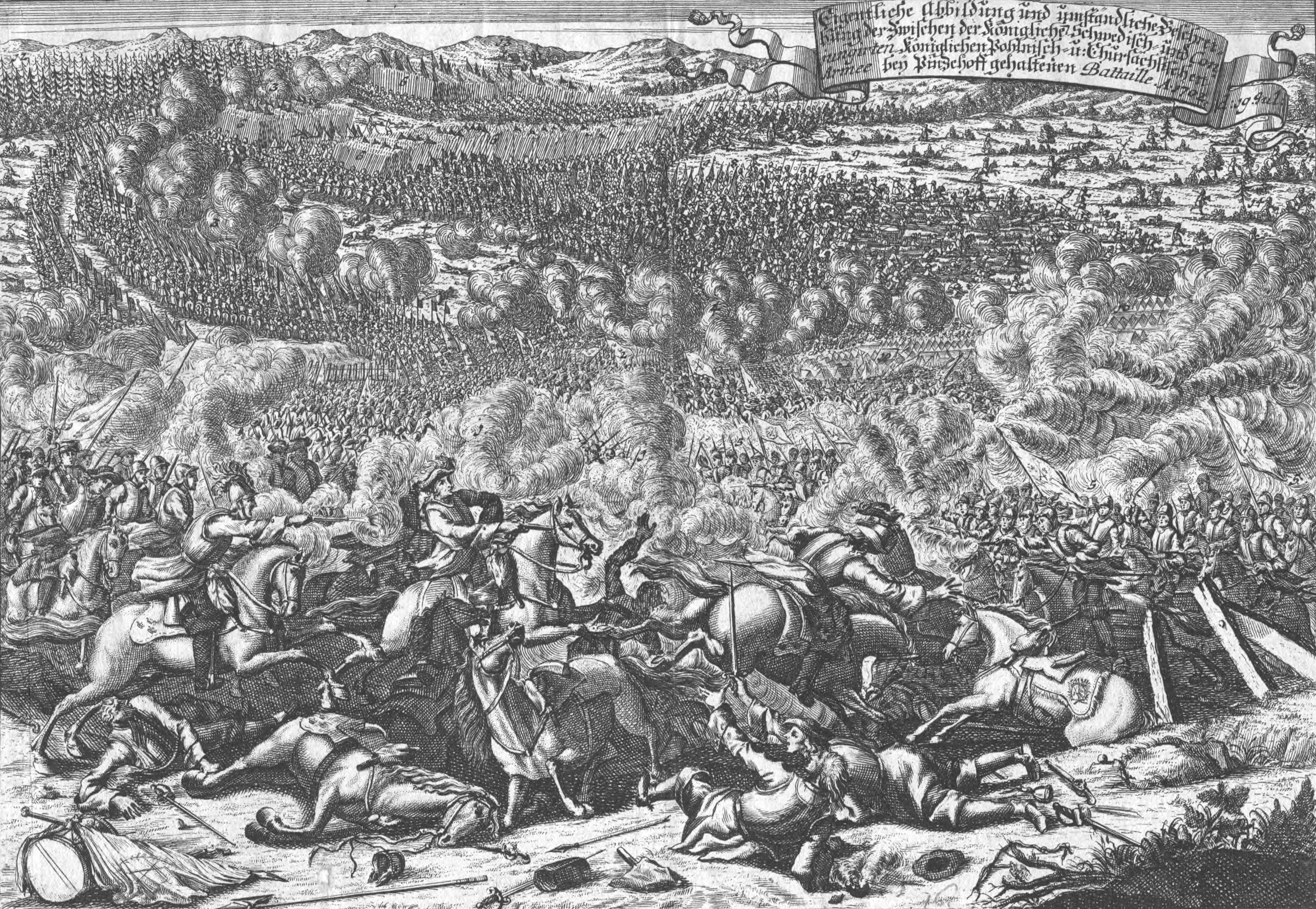
Contemporary engraving of the Battle of Kliszów

Following the second volley fired by the Swedish musketeers, while also being daunted by the Swedish pikemen, the Polish cavalry charges were quickly repulsed. The Småland and Scanian cavalry regiments later made a countercharge, causing Lubomirski's Polish cavalry to quickly collapse. Due to the lack of coordination and trust between the Polish-Saxon units, Lubomirski withdrew from the battlefield along with the Crown Army. The Swedish cavalry chased the Poles to Kije before they were ordered to break off from the pursuit. At the same time, the crowded Saxon right wing tried to expand their ground by attacking Vellingk's reinforced left wing. The point of impact was against three battalions from the Uppland, Närke-Värmland and Västerbotten regiments from the Swedish center. Commanding four Scanian squadrons, Vellingk attacked the Saxon dragoons frontally and in the flank. The attack was completed by a Värmland battalion. In less than an hour, the Saxon right wing was forced into retreat. Communication to the rear of the Saxon army was almost cut off. During the fighting, Flemming received two wounds and a horse he was riding was shot.

=== Action at the Swedish right wing ===
By 14:00, while the engagements against the Swedish left wing were still taking place, the Saxon left wing under Steinau had crossed the wetlands using fascine bridges at Rebów and rapidly advanced towards Rehnskiöld's troops. While these were occupied with regrouping their ranks, Steinau attempted to cut off Rehnskiöld's troops from the Swedish center. Steinau and Trampe made a flanking maneuver and attacked Rehnskiöld in the front, flank, and rear. With 34 Saxon squadrons against 21 Swedish squadrons, each with about 125 Saxons against 100 Swedes, the Saxons had a numerical advantage. Observing the danger, Rehnskiöld quickly sent Adjutant General Gustaf Adam Taube across the battlefield to Charles with a request for help. The king rejected Rehnskiöld's request and urged him to hold his ground on his own.

Rehnskiöld was forced to completely reorganize his troops, ordering the Västerbotten Regiment, the Uppland Reserve Regiment, and the squadrons of the Life Regiment on Horse to form square formations to face the Saxon attack from multiple directions. The ensuing battle was fierce and bloody. The Saxons fired a volley that caused heavy casualties among the Life Regiment on Horse in the front rank. These were supported by the Drabant Corps, who quickly repulsed the first Saxon attack. Rehnskiöld's cavalry then made a countercharge that penetrated several Saxon units. Steinau regrouped his units and performed a new attack against the Swedes east of Rebów but was again forced to withdraw. With great difficulty, several Saxon cavalry regiments reached safety on the west bank of the Nida while other units were pushed into the wetlands and drowned. A small body of Saxon cavalry occupied an adjacent height from which they attacked the Swedish cavalry trying to cross the wetlands but after a furious charge from the Drabant Corps, these were also forced to retreat.

=== Saxon disintegration ===
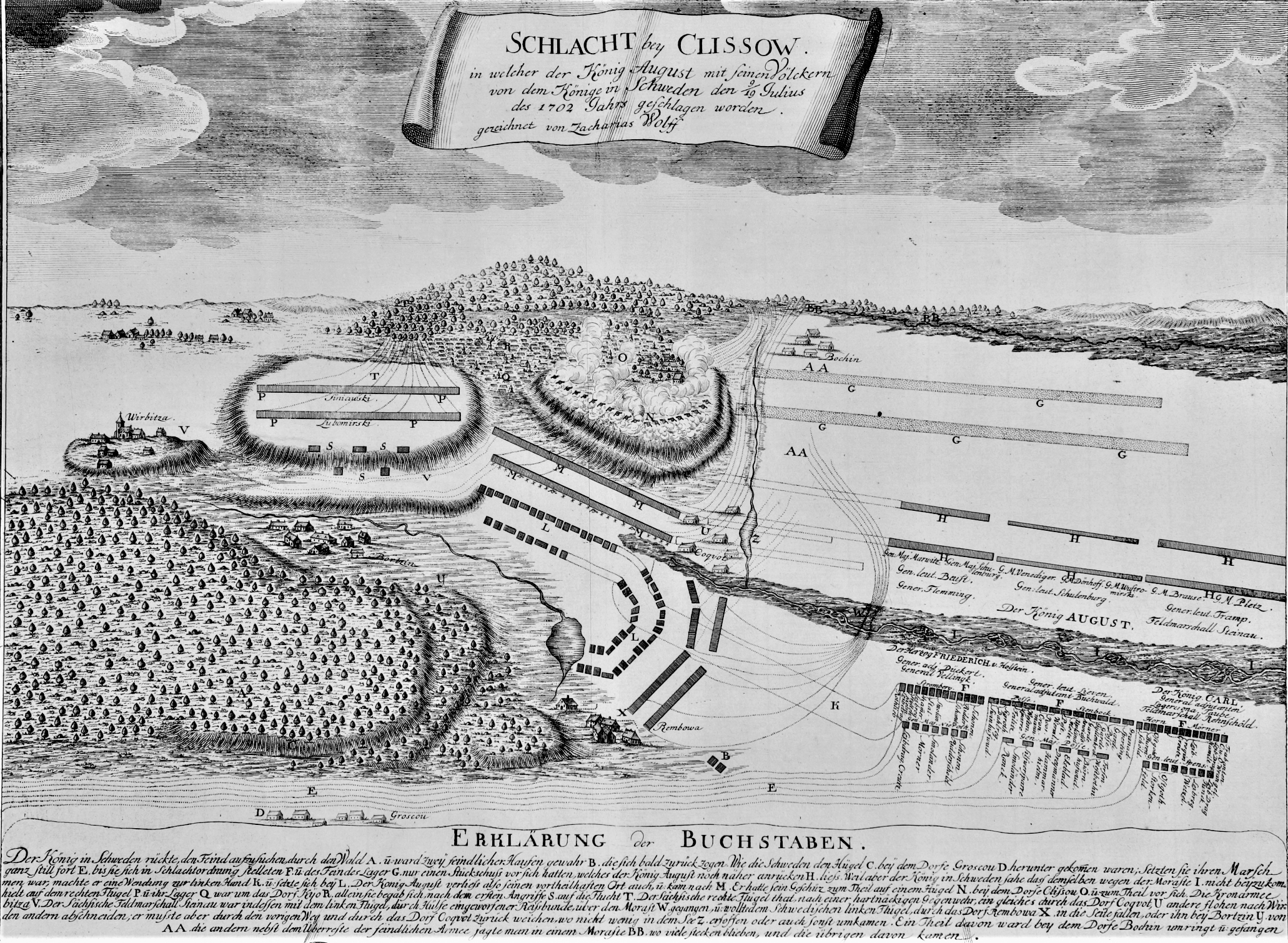
Engraving of the Battle of Kliszów from 1702 by Zacharias Wolff

Later in the afternoon, the Saxon infantry on Kulaki Height were still intact and their location being used as a rallying point for scattered Saxon cavalry divisions. At 15:00, the Swedes carried out coordinated attacks against Kulaki Height: Rehnskiöld attacked from the west, Posse from the north, and Charles and Vellingk from the east. The cavalry engagements in the early afternoon generated large clouds of dust and gunpowder smoke that drifted in southeasterly winds towards the height, and obstructed the Saxon artillery's aim. Using the clouds as a smoke screen, eight battalions from the Swedish center, consisting of the Svea Life Guards, the Uppland Regiment, the Västerbotten Regiment, and the Östergötland Reserve Regiment, marched along the narrow passages across a marshy stream in front of the hill. Under fierce artillery fire, they rushed up the hill's slope past the chevaux de frise and made a furious charge against the Saxon infantry. Their attack came at the cost of the Life Guards, which accounted for the majority of the Swedish losses in the battle. The Swedes captured the Saxon light regimental artillery and aimed the guns at the Saxons. Steinau's regiment was forced to lay down their arms.

At the same time, Lieutenant General Schulenburg rallied a significant number of retreating Saxon regiments to a new position on Kulaki Height. At 16:30, due to heavy enemy pressure from all sides, Augustus decided to fall back towards Hajdaszek Forest. After a quick recovery, they would continue their retreat through Pinczów and on to the road toward Kraków. Augustus took command of some remaining squadrons, who guided the retreat, and assigned a rearguard to cover his retreat. Squadrons of the Swedish left wing blocked the road to Pinczów at 16:00 and the last remnants of Augustus's army were chased away or captured in the former Saxon field camp. Many Saxons fell and drowned in the swamps behind Kliszów and Rebów, and Swedish musketeers fired at them "like wild animals stuck in a net". At 17:30, Charles recalled his troops from the battlefield to regroup in the newly conquered Saxon field camp. Between 17:00 and 18:00, the king ordered his musicians to "play songs of victory with fiddles and trumpets", and a mass was held.

== Casualties ==
=== Swedish casualties ===
The Swedish losses in the battle were 300 men killed, and between 500 and 900 wounded, but the widely accepted number is 800 wounded. According to other sources, up to 1,000 Swedes were killed in the battle. Among the dead were Duke Frederick IV, Lieutenant Colonel Ridderschantz, five captains, five ryttmästare, five lieutenants, two ensigns, two regimental quartermasters, and a corporal. Among the wounded were Major Generals Posse, Horn, and Spens, Lieutenant Colonel Stålhammar, one ryttmästare, three majors, two captains, three ensigns, and two non-commissioned officers. The Svea Life Guard's losses amounted to 337 privates and 34 officers—both killed and wounded. Two men—one of whom was an officer—were captured and 849 cavalry horses were killed. One standard was lost.

The following day, Charles ordered the dead Swedish privates and officers to be buried with all honors, and gave his troops permission to plunder the Saxon wagons scattered around the wetlands. Charles also gave orders that every wounded officer and non-commissioned officer of the Drabant Corps and the Life Guards should be given a quarter of a jug of wine and two jugs of beer a day, with which they would be provided for the next few days.

=== Saxon–Polish casualties ===
The combined Saxon–Polish army lost between around 1,800 to 2,000 men on the battlefield, More men were killed during the retreat but their number is unknown. According to Saxon relations, 1,706 Saxon soldiers were killed, and 231 officers and privates were wounded. The Polish Crown Army losses in the battle were about 80 killed, of whom 60 were winged hussars. Around 1,500 Saxons and Poles—including Field Marshal Steinau, Lieutenant General Flemming, and Major General Trampe—were wounded.

The Saxon infantry lost about 1,000 men. Saxon cavalry losses were 828 men, of whom 42 officers and 594 privates were killed, and 35 officers and 157 privates were wounded; and the Swedes captured 48 Saxon and Polish artillery pieces. Of the Saxon artillerymen, 70 were killed, 39 were wounded, and two officers were captured. According to other calculations, four Saxon cavalry regiments and five Saxon infantry regiments lost 1,406 men, of whom 475 were killed, 418 were wounded, and 513 were missing. About 1,700 men were captured, of whom 1,100 were unharmed. The Swedes seized Augustus's store of funds and equipment, the massed funds of the Russian envoy's chests to the value of 12,000 Swedish riksdaler, 60 standards and banners, and several ammunition stores and tents. Among the most precious spoils of war was a large Turkish tent that Augustus's father John George III had captured from the Ottoman Empire at the battle of Vienna in 1683.

== Aftermath ==
Due to Schulenburg's actions in the final stages of the battle, Augustus was able to retreat with most of his troops but his infantry was almost broken and he lost his respect among Poles, undermining Polish unity within the Commonwealth. Following the battle, Cardinal Radziejowski urged Lubomirski to no longer fight against the Swedes. The Swedes failed to pursue the Saxon–Polish army and their victory was not decisive because Augustus was able to retreat to Kraków, where he rallied fresh reinforcements and continued through eastern Poland towards Sandomierz. For Charles, the victory at Kliszów gave him increased operational freedom of movement within Poland, allowing him to use the weakened Commonwealth for his own benefit.

With Duke Frederick IV's death, his son Charles Frederick was proclaimed the new Duke of Holstein-Gottorp, under the guardianship of his mother Hedvig Sophia of Sweden and Frederick's brother Christian August. The duke's body was embalmed and on 27 August was escorted to Gottorf Castle by Georg Heinrich von Görtz. Among Görtz's escort were several wounded and disabled Swedish soldiers, each of whom was awarded 20 riksdaler to return to Sweden. In a letter to his sister Hedvig Sophia that was sent in August 1702 from the Swedish field camp at Kraków, King Charles wrote:

Thereto, I told about the blissful battle and that, which now, without any doubt, God knows better, must be as well known to my heart (Hedvig Sophia) as it is among us here, about the difficult and terrible misfortune that has befallen us, that we have lost our dear and precious brother-in-law, the duke, of which we will never fully regret and lament, and which turns all our joy into sorrow.

On July 10, Charles ordered Major Creutz to take Pińczów with 100 dragoons and cavalry. At Pińczów, the king established a field hospital for wounded Swedes and Saxon prisoners of war, and the rest of the Swedish army arrived there in the following days and encamped near the banks of the Nida. The king decreed every unharmed Saxon prisoner should be enlisted in the Swedish service; 900 of these men were awarded two months of salary in advance and were sent for garrison duty in Swedish Pomerania. The enlisted Saxons, however, mutinied near the border of Silesia and dispersed, and several of them returned to serve Augustus. While Charles later moved his army to Skalbmierz, he ordered Lieutenant Colonel von Feilitzen to form a garrison in Pińczów to guard the wounded and sick, and to collect supplies from the surrounding area. On 29 July, Charles captured Kraków and established his headquarters there. During the following weeks in Kraków, Charles held fruitless peace talks with Augustus and collected contributions for the maintenance of the main army. With the arrival of Gyllenstierna's troops, Charles was able to march into Lublin in early October, where he established winter quarters with an army of 23,000 men.

== See also ==
- Swedish invasion of Poland (1701–1706)
- Swedish invasion of Saxony
- Campaign of Grodno
- Civil war in Poland (1704–1706)

== Sources ==
=== Bibliography ===
- Adlerfelt, Gustaf; Fielding, Henry (1740), The military history of Charles XII, king of Sweden, written by the express order of his Majesty, by Gustavus Adlerfeld, London: John & Paul Knapton, OCLC 15007018
- Adlerfelt, Gustaf; Bring, Samuel Ebbe (1919), Karl XII:s krigsföretag 1700–1706 [Charles XII's campaigns 1700–1706] (in Swedish), Stockholm: Norstedt
- Berggren, Jan (2010), Rikets mest hatade man – Georg Heinrich von Görtz: en biografi [The most hated man in the kingdom – Georg Heinrich von Görtz: A biography] (in Swedish), Stockholm: Carlsson bokförlag, ISBN 978-91-7331-296-7
- Carlson, Ernst (1893), Konung Karl XII:s egenhändiga bref [King Charles XII's own letters] (in Swedish), Stockholm: Norstedt
- Carlson, Fredrik Ferdinand (1883), Sveriges historia under Konungarne af Pfalziska huset, II [History of Sweden under the Kings of the Palatinate Dynasty, II] (in Swedish), Stockholm: Norstedt
- Eriksson, Ingvar (2007), Karolinen Magnus Stenbock [Carolean Magnus Stenbock] (in Swedish), Stockholm: Atlantis, ISBN 978-91-7353-158-0
- Frost, Robert I (2000), The Northern Wars. War, State and Society in Northeastern Europe 1558–1721, Harlow: Longman, ISBN 978-0-582-06429-4
- Generalstaben (1918), Karl XII på slagfältet, II [Charles XII on the battlefield, II] (in Swedish), Stockholm: P.A. Norstedt och söners förlag, OCLC 163888651
- Hjärne, Harald (1902), Karl XII. Omstörtningen i Östeuropa 1697–1703 [Charles XII. The overthrow in Eastern Europe 1697–1703] (in Swedish), Stockholm: Ljus förlag
- Iko, Per; Wolke, Lars Ericson (2003), Svenska slagfält [Swedish battlefields] (in Swedish), Stockholm: Wahlström & Widstrand, ISBN 978-91-46-21087-0
- Konow, Jan von (2001), Karolinen Rehnskiöld, fältmarskalk [Carolean Rehnskiöld, Field marshal] (in Swedish), Stockholm: J. von Konow, ISBN 978-91-631-1606-3
- Kuvaja, Christer (2008), Krigen kring Östersjön – Karolinska krigare 1660–1721 [The wars around the Baltic Sea – Carolean warriors 1660–1721] (in Swedish), Helsingfors: Svenskt Militärhistoriskt Biblioteks Förlag, ISBN 978-951-50-1823-6
- Larsson, Olle (2009), Stormaktens sista krig [The last war of the great power] (in Swedish), Lund: Historiska Media, ISBN 978-91-85873-59-3
- Liljegren, Bengt (2000), Karl XII: en biografi [Charles XII: A biography] (in Swedish), Lund: Historiska Media, ISBN 978-91-89442-65-8
- Mankell, Julius (1866), Anteckningar rörande svenska regementernas historia [Notes concerning the history of Swedish regiments] (in Swedish), Örebro: Nils Magnus Lindh
- Nelsson, Bertil (1993), Från Brunkeberg till Nordanvind: 500 år med svenskt infanteri [From Brunkeberg to Nordanvind: 500 years with Swedish infantry] (in Swedish), Stockholm: Probus, ISBN 978-91-87184-23-9
- Quennerstedt, August (1903), Karolinska krigares dagböcker jämte andra samtida skrifter. II [Carolean warriors' diaries and other contemporary writings. II] (in Swedish), Lund: Gleerups förlag
- Quennerstedt, August (1913), Karolinska krigares dagböcker jämte andra samtida skrifter. IX [Carolean warriors' diaries and other contemporary writings. IX] (in Swedish), Lund: Gleerups förlag
- Rosander, Lars (2003), Sveriges fältmarskalkar: svenska fältherrar från Vasa till Bernadotte [Sweden's field marshals: Swedish warlords from Vasa to Bernadotte] (in Swedish), Lund: Historiska media, ISBN 978-91-89442-05-4
- Rosen, Carl (1936), Bidrag till kännedom om de händelser, som närmast föregingo svenska stormaktsväldets fall, I [Contribution to knowledge about the events that immediately preceded the fall of the great power of Sweden, I] (in Swedish), Stockholm: P.A. Norstedt & Söner, OCLC 465566526
- Wagner, Marek (1994), Kliszów 1702 (in Polish), Warsaw: Bellona, ISBN 978-83-11-08298-4
- Wetterberg, Gunnar (2006), Från tolv till ett: Arvid Horn (1664–1742) [From twelve to one: Arvid Horn (1664–1742)] (in Swedish), Stockholm: Atlantis, ISBN 978-91-7353-125-2
