= Gartatowice =

- Village
- Location within Poland
- Coordinates: 50°34′34″N 20°36′57″E
- Country: Poland
- Voivodeship: Świętokrzyskie
- County: Pińczów
- Gmina: Kije

Gartatowice [ɡartatɔˈvit͡sɛ] is a village in the administrative district of Gmina Kije, within Pińczów County, Świętokrzyskie Voivodeship, in south-central Poland. It lies approximately 5 km (3 mi) south-east of Kije, 8 km (5 mi) north-east of Pińczów, and 35 km (22 mi) south of the regional capital Kielce.
