= Janów, Pińczów County =

Janów
- Village
- Location within Poland
- Coordinates: 50°34′21″N 20°35′47″E
- Country: Poland
- Voivodeship: Świętokrzyskie
- County: Pińczów
- Gmina: Kije

Janów [ˈjanuf] is a village in the administrative district of Gmina Kije, within Pińczów County, Świętokrzyskie Voivodeship, in south-central Poland. It lies approximately 5 km (3 mi) south-east of Kije, 7 km (4 mi) north-east of Pińczów, and 35 km (22 mi) south of the regional capital Kielce.
