= Samostrzałów =

- Village
- Location within Poland
- Coordinates: 50°35′48″N 20°37′55″E
- Country: Poland
- Voivodeship: Świętokrzyskie
- County: Pińczów
- Gmina: Kije
- Population: 216

Samostrzałów [samɔsˈtʂawuf] is a village in the administrative district of Gmina Kije, within Pińczów County, Świętokrzyskie Voivodeship, in south-central Poland. It lies approximately 5 km (3 mi) east of Kije, 10 km (6 mi) north-east of Pińczów, and 32 km (20 mi) south of the regional capital Kielce.
