= Umianowice =

- Village
- Location within Poland
- Coordinates: 50°34′N 20°31′E
- Country: Poland
- Voivodeship: Świętokrzyskie
- County: Pińczów
- Gmina: Kije

Umianowice [umjanɔˈvit͡sɛ] is a village in the administrative district of Gmina Kije, within Pińczów County, Świętokrzyskie Voivodeship, in south-central Poland. It lies approximately 6 km (4 mi) south-west of Kije, 4 km (2 mi) north of Pińczów, and 36 km (22 mi) south of the regional capital Kielce.
