= Stawiany, Świętokrzyskie Voivodeship =

Stawiany
- Village
- Location within Poland
- Coordinates: 50°35′30″N 20°36′12″E
- Country: Poland
- Voivodeship: Świętokrzyskie
- County: Pińczów
- Gmina: Kije

Stawiany [staˈvjanɨ] is a village in the administrative district of Gmina Kije, within Pińczów County, Świętokrzyskie Voivodeship, in south-central Poland. It lies approximately 3 km (2 mi) south-east of Kije, 9 km (6 mi) north-east of Pińczów, and 33 km (21 mi) south of the regional capital Kielce.
