= Gołuchów =

Gołuchów may refer to:

- Gołuchów, Greater Poland Voivodeship, Poland
- Gołuchów, Świętokrzyskie Voivodeship, Poland

== See also ==
- Gmina Gołuchów
