= Kliszów, Świętokrzyskie Voivodeship =

Kliszów
- Village
- Location within Poland
- Coordinates: 50°37′0″N 20°31′33″E
- Country: Poland
- Voivodeship: Świętokrzyskie
- County: Pińczów
- Gmina: Kije

Population (approx.)
  - Total: 260

Kliszów ([ˈkliʂuf]) is a village in the administrative district of Gmina Kije, within Pińczów County in the Świętokrzyskie Voivodeship of south-central Poland. It lies approximately 4 km (2 mi) west of Kije, 10 km (6 mi) north of Pińczów, and 31 km (19 mi) south of the regional capital, Kielce.

A decisive engagement of the Great Northern War, the Battle of Kliszów, took place near the village between the forces of the Saxony–Polish–Lithuanian Commonwealth and the Swedish Empire.
