= Górki, Pińczów County =

Górki
- Village
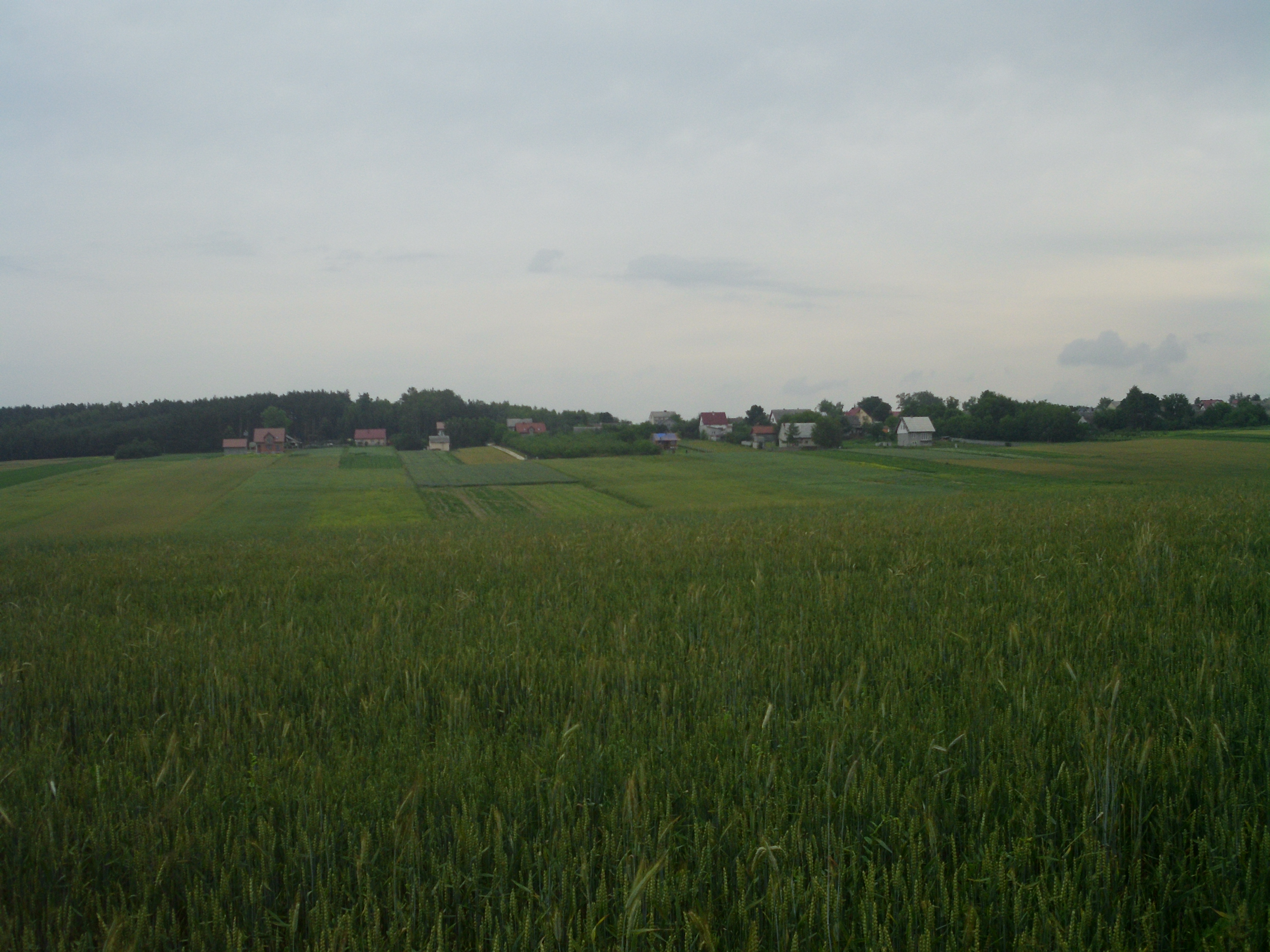
- Górki from the south-west

- Location within Poland
- Coordinates: 50°37′36″N 20°34′47″E
- Country: Poland
- Voivodeship: Świętokrzyskie
- County: Pińczów
- Gmina: Kije

Górki [ˈɡurki] is a village in the administrative district of Gmina Kije, within Pińczów County, Świętokrzyskie Voivodeship, in south-central Poland. It lies approximately 3 km (2 mi) north of Kije, 11 km (7 mi) north of Pińczów, and 29 km (18 mi) south of the regional capital Kielce.
