= Lipnik, Pińczów County =

Lipnik
- Village
- Location within Poland
- Coordinates: 50°36′21″N 20°35′9″E
- Country: Poland
- Voivodeship: Świętokrzyskie
- County: Pińczów
- Gmina: Kije

Lipnik (Polish pronunciation: [ˈlipɲik]) is a village in the administrative district of Gmina Kije, within Pińczów County, Świętokrzyskie Voivodeship, in south-central Poland. It lies approximately 2 km (1 mi) east of Kije, 9 km (6 mi) north-east of Pińczów, and 31 km (19 mi) south of the regional capital Kielce.

Fossils of the genus Marsupite, an extinct genus of stalkless crinoids, were found in this location.
