= Gołuchów, Świętokrzyskie Voivodeship =

Gołuchów
- Village
- Location within Poland
- Coordinates: 50°37′45″N 20°37′10″E
- Country: Poland
- Voivodeship: Świętokrzyskie
- County: Pińczów
- Gmina: Kije

Gołuchów [ɡɔˈwuxuf] is a village in the administrative district of Gmina Kije, within Pińczów County, Świętokrzyskie Voivodeship, in south-central Poland. It lies approximately 5 km (3 mi) north-east of Kije, 13 km (8 mi) north-east of Pińczów, and 29 km (18 mi) south of the regional capital Kielce.
