= Hajdaszek =

- Village
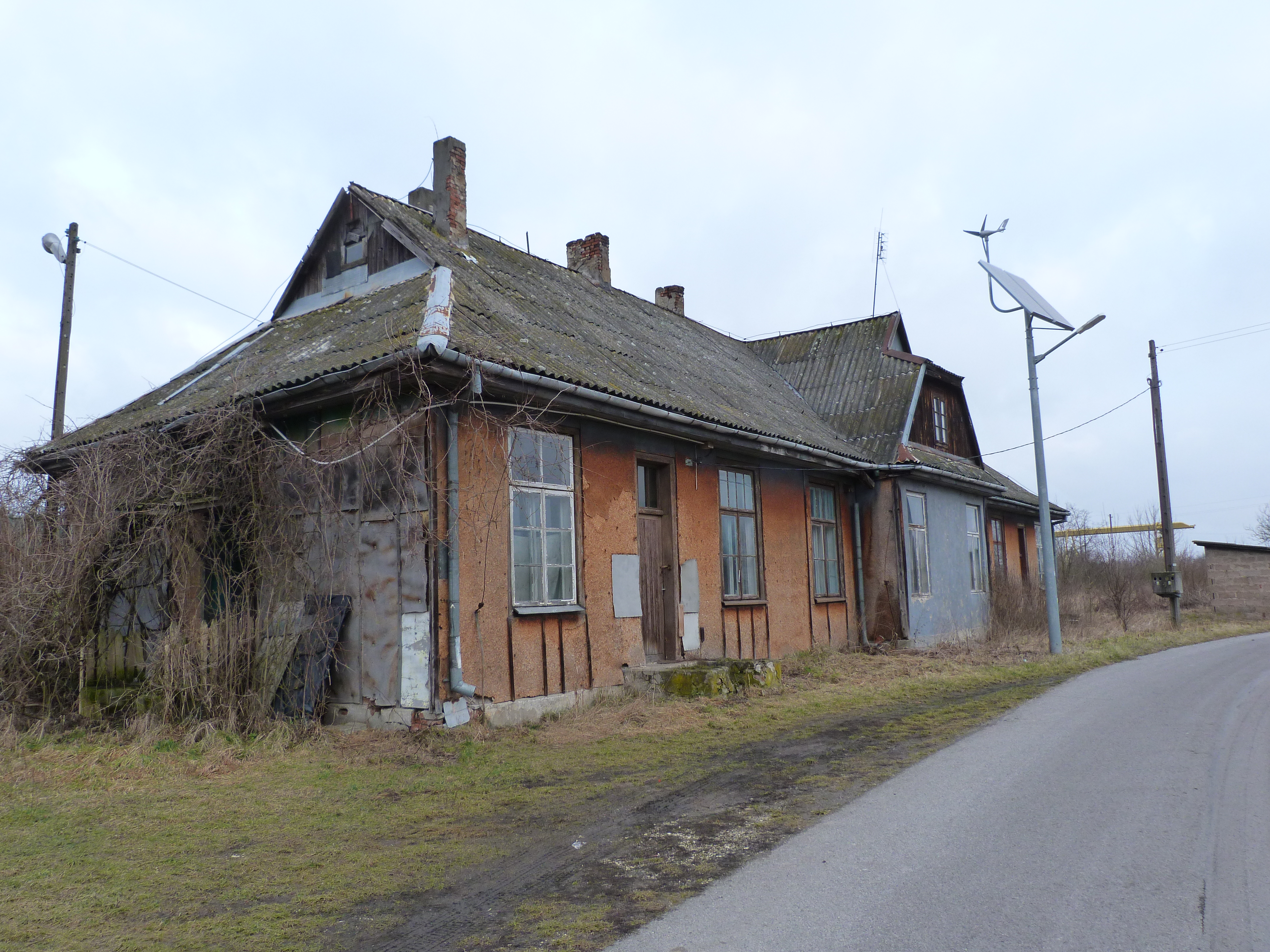
- Railway station

- Location within Poland
- Coordinates: 50°36′N 20°33′E
- Country: Poland
- Voivodeship: Świętokrzyskie
- County: Pińczów
- Gmina: Kije

Hajdaszek [xai̯ˈdaʂɛk] is a village in the administrative district of Gmina Kije, within Pińczów County, Świętokrzyskie Voivodeship, in south-central Poland. It lies approximately 2 km (1 mi) south-west of Kije, 8 km (5 mi) north of Pińczów, and 32 km (20 mi) south of the regional capital Kielce.
