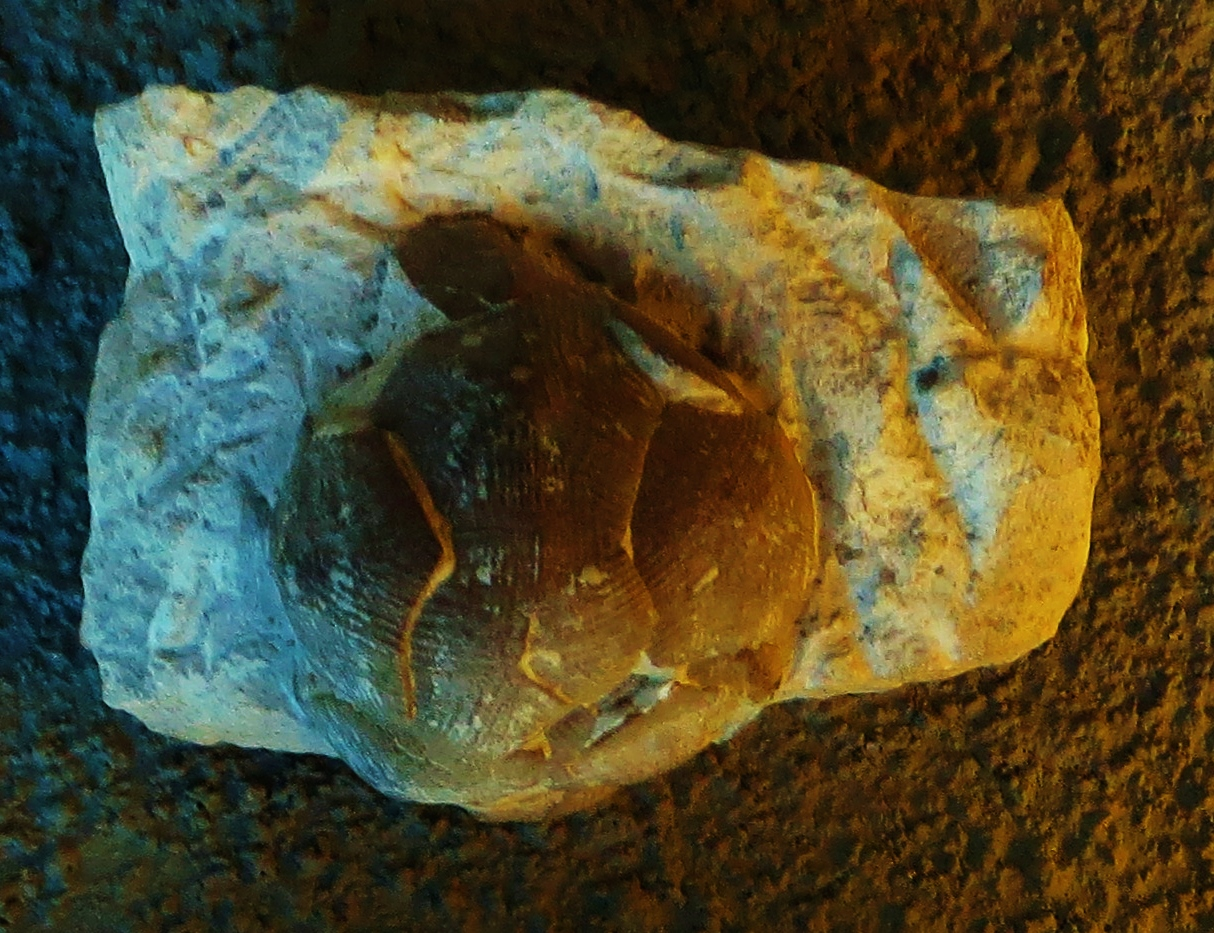
- Marsupites testudinarius fossil

Scientific classification
- Kingdom: Animalia
- Phylum: Echinodermata
- Class: Crinoidea
- Order: †Uintacrinida
- Family: †Marsupitidae
- Genus: †Marsupites; Mantell in Miller, 1821

Species
- Marsupites americanus Springer 1911; Marsupites lamberti Besairie 1936; Marsupites testudinarius Schlotheim 1820

= Marsupites =

Marsupites Temporal range: Santonian ~86.3–83.6 Ma

Extinct genus of crinoids

Marsupites is an extinct genus of stalkless crinoids from the Santonian stage of the Late Cretaceous.

== Biostratigraphic significance ==
The International Commission on Stratigraphy (ICS) had provisionally assigned the extinction of Marsupites testudinarius as the defining biological marker for the start of the Campanian stage of the Late Cretaceous, 83.6 ± 0.2 million years ago, until a new final definition was eventually ratified in 2022, based instead primarily on magnetostratigraphy.

== Distribution ==
Fossils of the genus have been found in:

- Lipnik, Poland
- Haslam Formation, British Columbia, Canada
