= Gmina Kije =

Kije (gmina) Kije Commune
- Gmina
- Flag Coat of arms
- Interactive map of Kije (gmina)
- Coordinates (Kije): 50°36′25″N 20°34′15″E
- Country: Poland
- Voivodeship: Świętokrzyskie
- County: Pińczów
- Seat: Kije

Area
  - Total: 99.26 km^{2} (38.32 sq mi)

Population (2006)
  - Total: 4,624
  - Density: 46.58/km^{2} (120.7/sq mi)
- Website: http://www.kije.pl/

Gmina Kije is a rural gmina (administrative district) in Pińczów County, Świętokrzyskie Voivodeship, in south-central Poland. Its seat is the village of Kije, which lies approximately 9 kilometres (6 mi) north of Pińczów and 31 km (19 mi) south of the regional capital Kielce.

The gmina covers an area of 99.26 square kilometres (38.3 sq mi), and as of 2006 its total population is 4,624.

The gmina contains parts of the protected areas called Nida Landscape Park and Szaniec Landscape Park.

== Villages ==
Gmina Kije contains the villages and settlements of Borczyn, Czechów, Gartatowice, Gołuchów, Górki, Hajdaszek, Janów, Kije, Kliszów, Kokot, Lipnik, Rębów, Samostrzałów, Stawiany, Umianowice, Wierzbica, Włoszczowice, Wola Żydowska, Wymysłów and Żydówek.

== Neighbouring gminas ==
Gmina Kije is bordered by the gminas of Chmielnik, Imielno, Morawica, Pińczów and Sobków.
