= Rębów, Świętokrzyskie Voivodeship =

Rębów
- Village
- Location within Poland
- Coordinates: 50°37′46″N 20°30′59″E
- Country: Poland
- Voivodeship: Świętokrzyskie
- County: Pińczów
- Gmina: Kije

Rębów [ˈrɛmbuf] is a village in the administrative district of Gmina Kije, within Pińczów County, Świętokrzyskie Voivodeship, in south-central Poland. It lies approximately 5 km (3 mi) north-west of Kije, 11 km (7 mi) north of Pińczów, and 30 km (19 mi) south of the regional capital Kielce.
