= Wymysłów, Gmina Kije =

Wymysłów
- Village
- Location within Poland
- Coordinates: 50°37′23″N 20°36′4″E
- Country: Poland
- Voivodeship: Świętokrzyskie
- County: Pińczów
- Gmina: Kije

Wymysłów [vɨˈmɨswuf] is a village in the administrative district of Gmina Kije, within Pińczów County, Świętokrzyskie Voivodeship, in south-central Poland. It lies approximately 3 km (2 mi) north-east of Kije, 12 km (7 mi) north-east of Pińczów, and 29 km (18 mi) south of the regional capital Kielce.
