= Kokot, Świętokrzyskie Voivodeship =

Kokot
- Village
- Location within Poland
- Coordinates: 50°36′46″N 20°32′52″E
- Country: Poland
- Voivodeship: Świętokrzyskie
- County: Pińczów
- Gmina: Kije
- Population: 220

Kokot [ˈkɔkɔt] is a village in the administrative district of Gmina Kije, within Pińczów County, Świętokrzyskie Voivodeship, in south-central Poland. It lies approximately 2 km (1 mi) west of Kije, 9 km (6 mi) north of Pińczów, and 31 km (19 mi) south of the regional capital Kielce.
