= Borczyn =

- Village
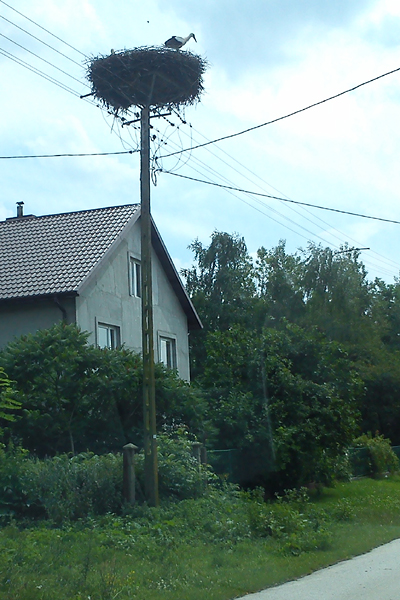

- Location within Poland
- Coordinates: 50°38′N 20°32′E
- Country: Poland
- Voivodeship: Świętokrzyskie
- County: Pińczów
- Gmina: Kije

Borczyn [ˈbɔrt͡ʂɨn] is a village in the administrative district of Gmina Kije, within Pińczów County, Świętokrzyskie Voivodeship, in south-central Poland. It lies approximately 4 km (2 mi) north-west of Kije, 12 km (7 mi) north of Pińczów, and 29 km (18 mi) south of the regional capital Kielce.
