= Battle of Kliszów (painting) =

Painting by an unknown artist

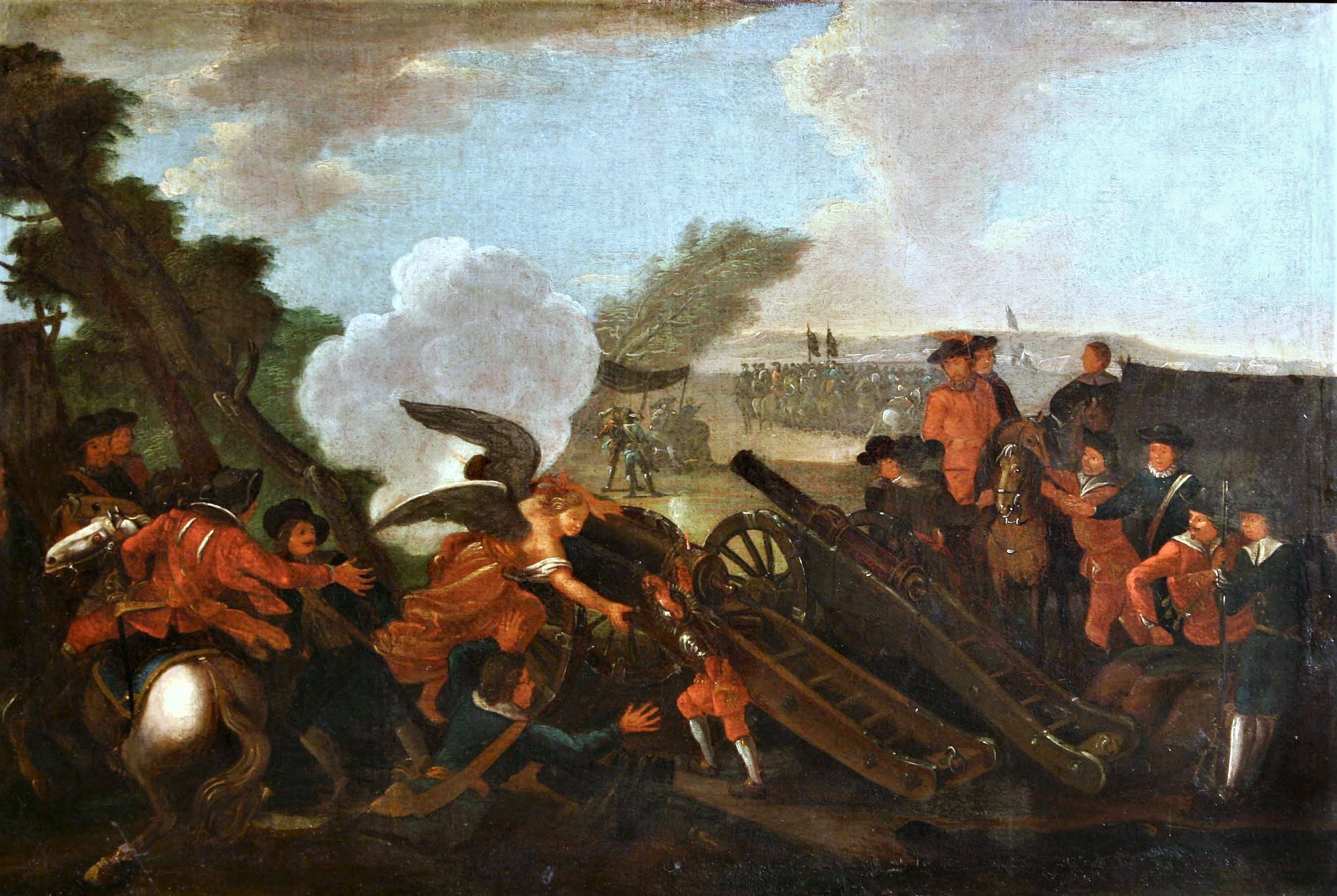

Battle of Kliszów is an 18th-century oil on canvas painting by an unknown artist. It depicts the Battle of Kliszów on 19 July 1702 between the Swedish army under Charles XII and a Saxon-Polish force under Augustus II the Strong and Hieronim Augustyn Lubomirski during the Great Northern War.

The foreground shows an angel guiding a cannon being shot by Marcin Kątski, the royal general of artillery - legend held that as Charles' brother-in-law Prince Frederick led an attack on the Saxon-Polish right wing he was mortally wounded by a divinely-guided shot fired by Katski, dying later that day. Beside Katski, with his back to the viewer, is the back of a mounted artillery officer, with other officers behind the cannon to the right of the painting and the Swedish army in the background.
