= Wierzbica, Pińczów County =

Wierzbica
- Village
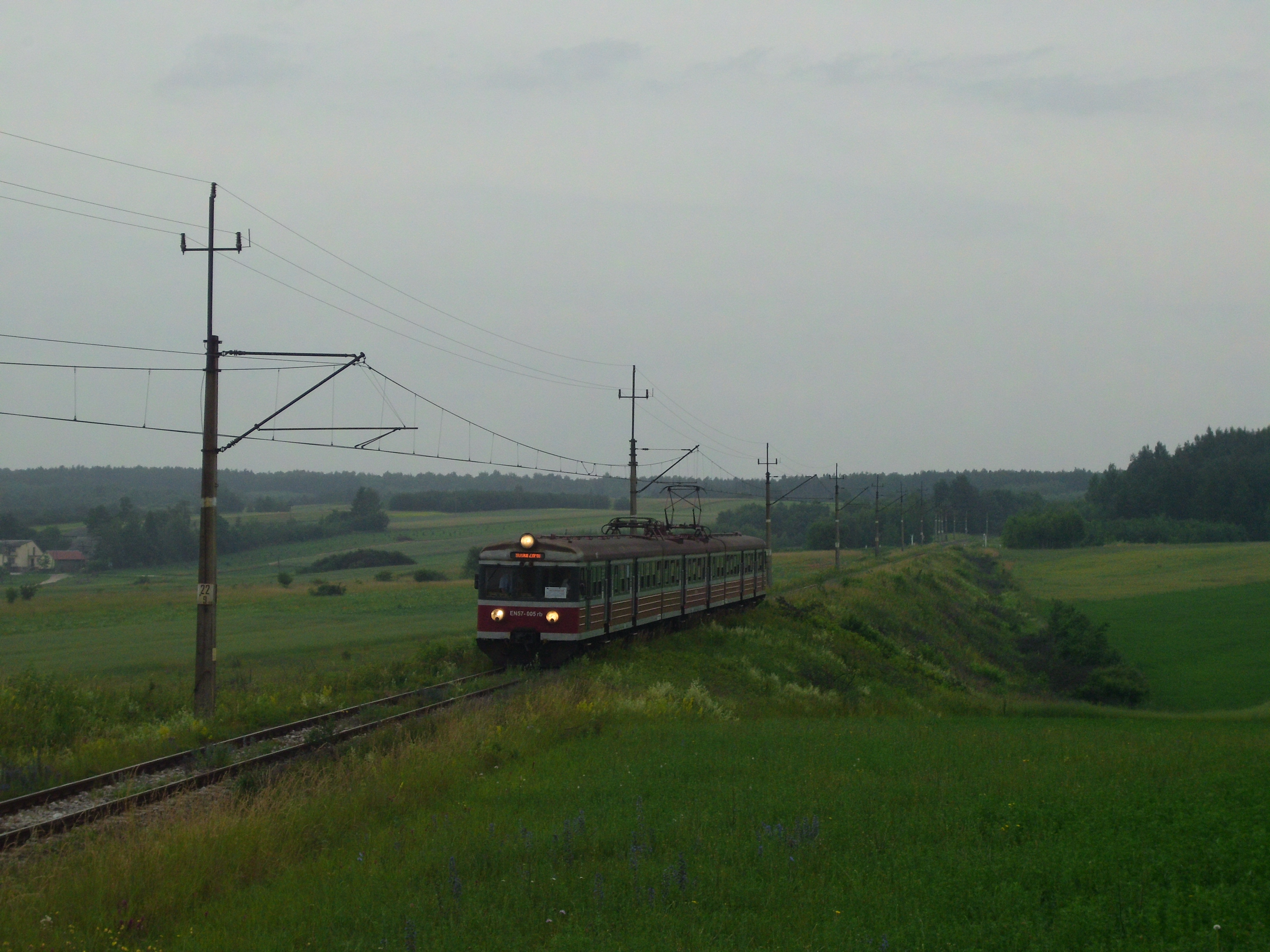

- Location within Poland
- Coordinates: 50°37′50″N 20°33′50″E
- Country: Poland
- Voivodeship: Świętokrzyskie
- County: Pińczów
- Gmina: Kije

Wierzbica [vjɛʐˈbit͡sa] is a village in the administrative district of Gmina Kije, within Pińczów County, Świętokrzyskie Voivodeship, in south-central Poland. It lies approximately 3 km (2 mi) north of Kije, 12 km (7 mi) north of Pińczów, and 29 km (18 mi) south of the regional capital Kielce.
