= Atanazy Miączyński =

Polish-Lithuanian noble (1639–1723)

Atanazy Walenty Miączyński
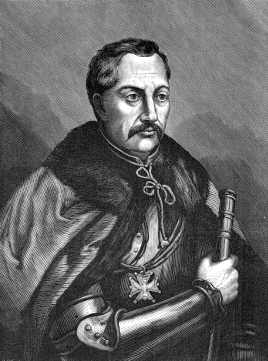

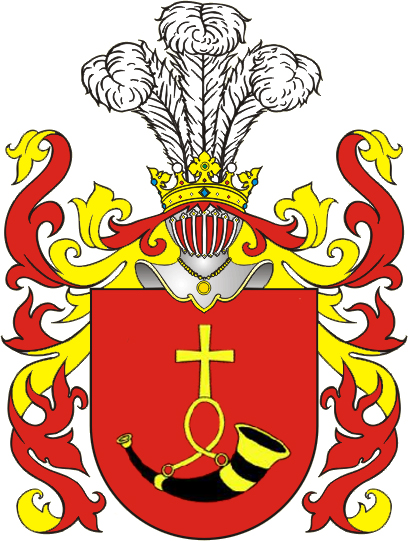
- Coat of arms: Suchekomnaty
- Born: 1639; Zawieprzyce, Lublin Voivodeship
- Died: March 1723 (aged 83–84)
- Buried: Maciejów
- Noble family: Miączyński
- Consorts: Helena Łuszkowska
- Father: Piotr Miączyński
- Mother: Regina Cieklińska h. Awdaniec

Atanazy Walenty Miączyński h. Suchekomnaty (b. 1639, d. March 1723) was a Polish-Lithuanian nobleman and politician, Treasurer of the Crown Court from 1689. He was voivode of Volhynia from 1713 and Starosta of Krzepice from 1677 and Lutsk from 1681. He was made a Count of the Holy Roman Empire in 1683.

He participated in several battles, among others at the Battle of Chocim, Battle of Żurawno, Battle of Párkány and the Battle of Vienna.

== Marriage and issue ==
Atanazy married Helena Łuszkowska h. Korczak in 1690. They had six children:

- Antoni Miączyński (1691-1774), married Princess Dorota Woroniecka h. Korybut (1712–1785)
- Piotr Miączyński (1695-1726), married Antonina Rzewuska
- Kazimierz Miączyński
- Katarzyna Miączyńska (died 1729), married Franciszek Maksymilian Ossoliński
- Elżbieta Miączyńska (died 1737), married Józef Sierakówski h. Ogończyk
- Józef Miączyński (died ca. 1723)

== Bibliography ==
- Polski Słownik Biograficzny t. 20 p. 553
