= Kije, Świętokrzyskie Voivodeship =

Kije
- Village
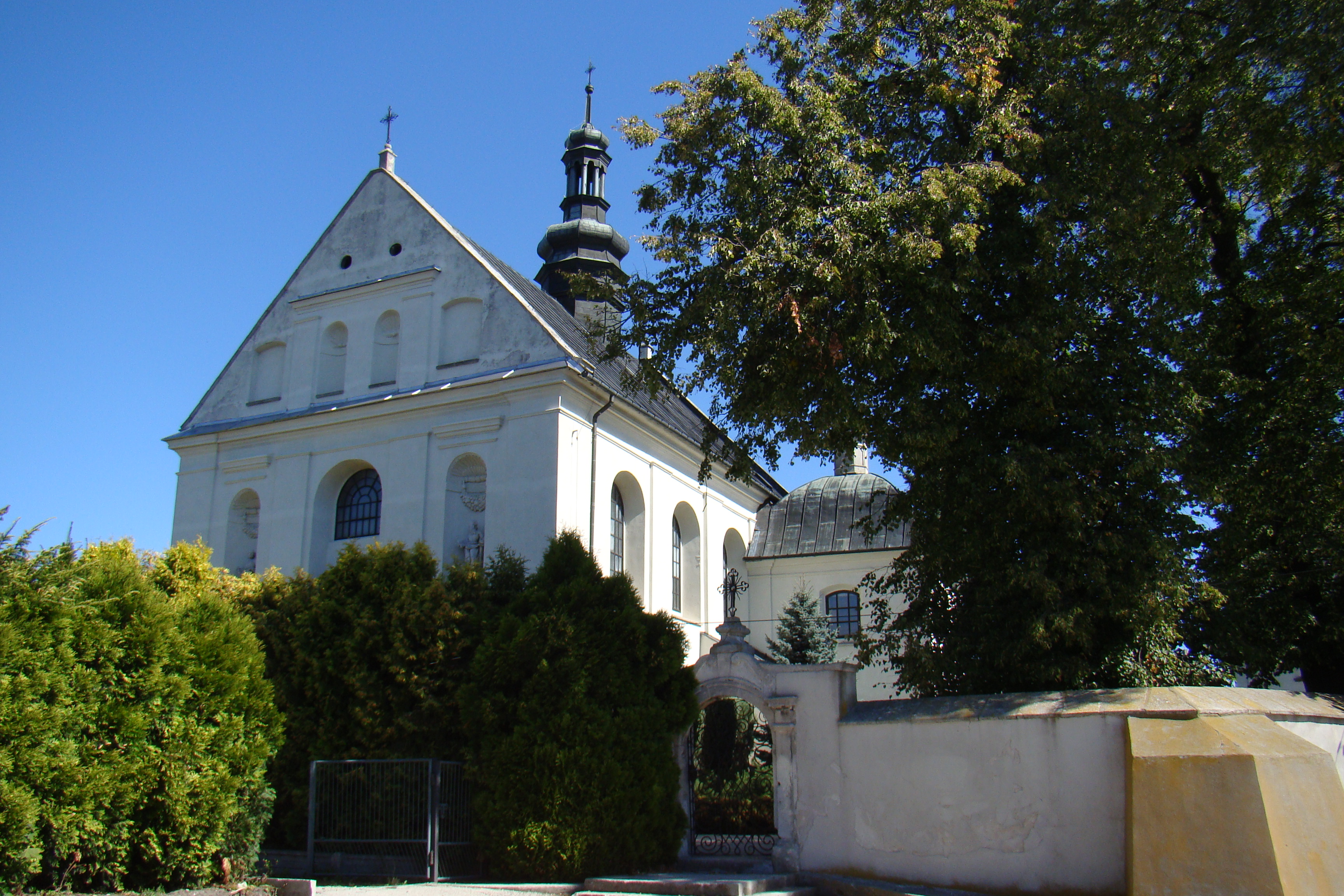
- Church of Saints Peter and Paul

- Coat of arms

- Location within Poland
- Coordinates: 50°36′25″N 20°34′15″E
- Country: Poland
- Voivodeship: Świętokrzyskie
- County: Pińczów
- Gmina: Kije
- Website: www.kije.pl

Kije [ˈkijɛ] is a village in Pińczów County, Świętokrzyskie Voivodeship, in south-central Poland. It is the seat of the gmina (administrative district) called Gmina Kije. It lies approximately 9 km (6 mi) north of Pińczów and 31 km (19 mi) south of the regional capital Kielce.
