= Doležal =

Doležal (feminine: Doležalová) is a Czech surname. It has its root in the verb doležat / doležet, which meant 'to age' (about food) and 'to live to see'. The surname originated as a nickname for a lazy person. A similar surname with the same etymology is Doležel. A Germanised form of the surname is Doleschal. Notable people with the surname include:

- Bogumir Doležal (1889–1959), Croatian sportsman and journalist
- Bohumil Doležal (born 1940), Czech literary critic and politician
- František Doležal (1913–?), Czech boxer
- Greg Dolezal (born 1978), American politician
- Josef Doležal (1920–1990), Czech athlete
- Joshua Dolezal (born 1975), American academic and writer
- Jiří Doležal (ice hockey, born 1963), Czech ice hockey player
- Jiří Doležal (ice hockey, born 1985), Czech ice hockey player
- Lucie Doležalová (born 1977), Czech medievalist and philologist
- Marie Doležalová (born 1987), Czech actress
- Martin Doležal (footballer, born 1980), Czech footballer
- Martin Doležal (footballer, born 1990), Czech footballer
- Michal Doležal (footballer) (born 1977), Czech footballer
- Michal Doležal (ski jumper) (born 1978), Czech ski jumper
- Rachel Dolezal (born 1977), American civil rights activist
- Riley Dolezal (born 1985), American javelin thrower
- Rudi Dolezal (born 1958), Austrian film director and film producer
- Rudolf Doležal (1916–2002), Czech sculptor and medalist
- Sanja Doležal (born 1963), Croatian singer
- Tomáš Doležal (born 1990), Czech ice hockey player
- Zdeněk Doležal (born 1931), Czech pair skater
- Zuzana Doležalová (born 1980), Czech snowboarder

== See also ==
- 5884 Dolezal, a main-belt asteroid
