= Rachel Dolezal =

American racial identity activist (born 1977)

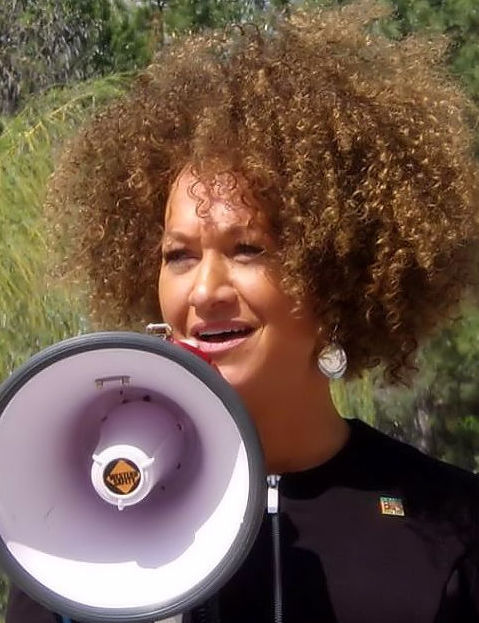
- Dolezal at a rally in 2015
- Born: Rachel Anne Dolezal; November 12, 1977 (age 49); Lincoln County, Montana, U.S.
- Other names: Rachel Moore; Nkechi Amare Diallo
- Education: Belhaven University (BA); Howard University (MFA)
- Spouse: Kevin Moore (m. 2000; div. 2004)
- Children: 3
- Relatives: Joshua Dolezal (brother)

Nkechi Amare Diallo; born Rachel Anne Dolezal; (Note: Her surname, pronounced /ˈdoʊləʒɑːl/ DOH-lə-zhahl, is also spelled as Doležal (see more). She was born Rachel Anne Dolezal and was known as Rachel Moore during her marriage to Kevin Moore from 2000 to 2005. In 2016, Dolezal legally changed her name to Nkechi Amare Diallo, but continued to use her birth name in professional life.) November 12, 1977) is an American activist, author, and former college instructor known for presenting herself as a Black woman despite being ethnically White.

Dolezal was born in Montana to parents of predominantly German, Czech, and Swedish ancestry. She received her bachelor's degree from Belhaven University in 2000 and her master's degree, summa cum laude, from Howard University in 2002. Dolezal unsuccessfully sued Howard University, a historically Black university, for discriminating against her due to her status as a White woman. Later, Dolezal darkened her skin, permed her hair, and claimed a Black identity. She started working as an instructor in the Africana Education program at Eastern Washington University in 2010. In 2014, Dolezal was appointed as chair of the Office of the Police Ombudsman Commission in Spokane, Washington; on her application, she stated that she had Black ancestry. Dolezal also became president of the NAACP chapter in Spokane in 2014.

Dolezal alleged that she was subjected to racist harassment in Coeur d'Alene, Idaho, and in Spokane. Her allegations were not substantiated by law enforcement. After looking into Dolezal's allegations, a reporter found that she had identified a Black man as her father; the reporter spoke with the man, who contradicted Dolezal's assertion. The reporter then located Dolezal's actual parents. On June 11, 2015, Coeur d'Alene Press published an article on Dolezal stating that she had "made claims in the media and elsewhere about her ethnicity, race and background" that were contradicted by her parents. The controversy became national news and fueled debate about racial identity. Dolezal stepped down from her NAACP position, was removed from her post as chair of the Police Ombudsman Commission over "a pattern of misconduct", and was dismissed from her position at Eastern Washington University.

Eventually, Dolezal acknowledged that she had been "born white to white parents", but maintained that she self-identified as Black. In 2017, Dolezal released a memoir, In Full Color: Finding My Place in a Black and White World. She was charged with felony theft by welfare fraud and second degree perjury in May 2018; the matter was resolved in a diversion agreement in which she agreed to repay her public assistance benefits and perform community service.

== Early life, family, and education ==
Rachel Anne Dolezal was born in Lincoln County, Montana on November 12, 1977. Her parents are Ruthanne (née Schertel) and Lawrence "Larry" Dolezal, who are White and are primarily of German, Czech, and Swedish ancestry. The surname Dolezal is of Czech origin. Ruthanne and Larry Dolezal were married in 1974.

As a child, Dolezal was a light-skinned blonde with freckles. Dolezal has an older biological brother, Joshua Dolezal. He is a professor of English at Central College in Iowa and has authored a book about his upbringing in Montana. When Dolezal was a teenager, her parents adopted three African-American children and one Haitian child.

Dolezal has said she was born and lived in a tipi and that her family had hunted for food with a bow and arrow. Her mother stated that she and Dolezal's father briefly lived in a tipi in 1974, three years before their daughter was born, and that Dolezal's claims were "totally false". From 2002 to 2006, her parents and siblings lived in South Africa as Christian missionaries. Dolezal said she lived in South Africa as a child, but her family disputes the claim.

Dolezal was raised in Troy, Montana, in the Pentecostal faith. She has stated that her parents frequently abused her. In a 2015 interview, Dolezal said she was "punished by skin complexion" by her mother and "white stepfather", and compared this alleged punishment to the punishment suffered by black slaves. Specifically, Dolezal alleged that her parents had beaten her with a baboon whip. In a 2017 interview, she said she was taught to believe that "everything that came naturally, instinctively was wrong"—a point that was "literally beaten into us". Dolezal's mother has denied that Dolezal has a stepfather, and both parents have denied her claims of abuse.

Dolezal was homeschooled via the Christian Liberty Academy CLASS program, achieving a 4.0 grade point average (GPA). She was one of several co-valedictorians upon graduation in 1996. She won a $2,000 scholarship for college awarded by Tandy Leather for her entry, a portrait of a Black woman, in their 1996 Leather Art contest. In 1998, she entered artworks at Spokane's annual Juneteenth celebration; she expressed African-American themes through collages and mixed-media works.

Following the completion of high school, Dolezal attended Belhaven University in Jackson, Mississippi. She received her bachelor's degree in 2000. She then attended Howard University, a historically Black college in Washington, D.C.; she received a Master of Fine Arts, summa cum laude, from Howard in 2002. Her thesis at Howard was a series of paintings presented from the perspective of a Black man. Dolezal later said that she was drugged and sexually assaulted by a "trusted mentor" when attending Howard University, and that "suing was nearly impossible".

=== Lawsuit against Howard University ===
In 2002, Dolezal unsuccessfully sued Howard University for discrimination based on "race, pregnancy, family responsibilities, and gender, as well as retaliation". Her lawsuit alleged that she was denied scholarship funds, a teaching assistant position, and other opportunities because she was a White woman. She also alleged that the removal of her artwork from a student exhibition at Howard in 2001 "was motivated by a discriminatory purpose to favor African-American students" over her.

== Career ==
=== Art ===
Dolezal created a fountain sculpture titled "Triumph of the Human Spirit". It was installed in downtown Spokane in June 2005 and was later auctioned off to benefit the Human Rights Education Institute.

In 2007, while working as an art teacher at School Indigo in Coeur d'Alene, Idaho, Dolezal collaborated with children to make five works for a "Rights of the Child" exhibit by the Human Rights Education Institute.

==== Plagiarism accusations ====
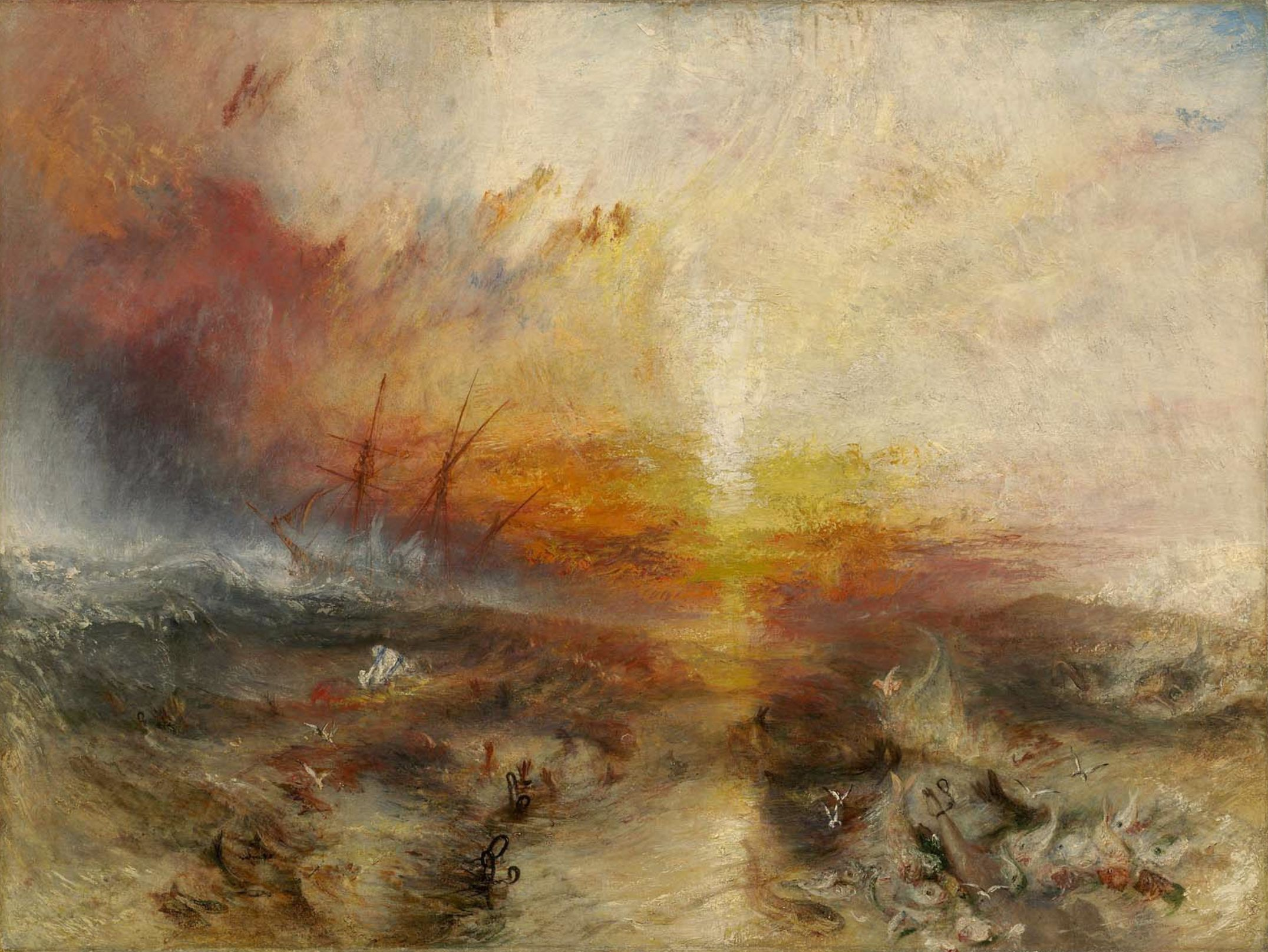
The Slave Ship (1840) by J. M. W. Turner. Dolezal has been accused of plagiarizing this painting.

In June 2015, Priscilla Frank at The Huffington Post and Sarah Cascone at Artnet accused Dolezal of plagiarism. They observed that a Dolezal painting titled The Shape of Our Kind is nearly identical to J. M. W. Turner's 1840 work, The Slave Ship, which was uncredited.

=== Civil rights activism ===
==== Human Rights Institute ====
Dolezal served as education director of the Human Rights Institute in Coeur d'Alene, Idaho, from 2008 to 2010. A July 2010 newspaper article indicated that Dolezal had stepped down as education director. Dolezal indicated that she was, "for all intents and purposes," forced to resign from the organization after its board declined to hire her as its executive director.

==== NAACP ====
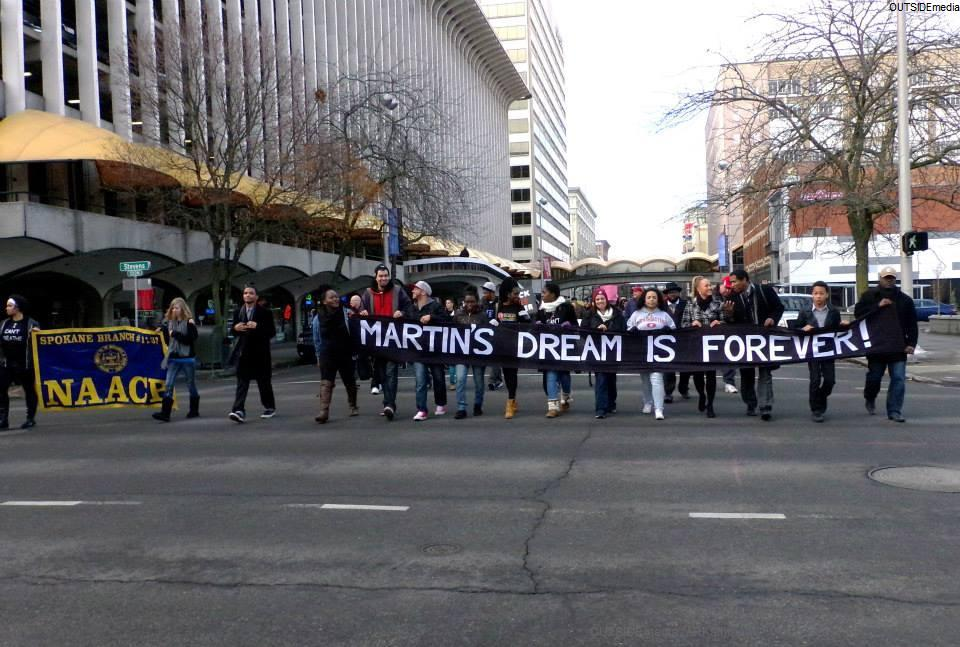
Dolezal (fourth from right) while marching with NAACP activists in Spokane, Washington and holding a sign reading "Martin's dream is forever!" on Martin Luther King Day in January 2015.

Dolezal was elected president of the Spokane chapter of the NAACP in 2014, replacing James Wilburn. During her brief tenure, she was noted for revitalizing the chapter. Her resignation from the civil rights organization was announced on June 15, 2015, after the controversy surrounding her racial identity became public.

==== Police Ombudsman Commission ====
Dolezal applied for the position of chair of the Office of the Police Ombudsman Commission in Spokane in May 2014. She was subsequently appointed to the post by Mayor David Condon. In her application, she identified herself as having several ethnicities, including Black. In June 2015, City Council President Ben Stuckart said the city had opened an investigation of the truthfulness of her application. On June 17, 2015, the investigation concluded that she had acted improperly, violated government rules and abused her authority. A report stated that the evidence and interviews confirmed workplace harassment allegations and "a pattern of misconduct" by Dolezal. Dolezal was asked to resign by Condon and Stuckart due to "intimidating and harassing" behavior. On June 18, 2015, the Spokane City Council voted unanimously to remove Dolezal from her position as chair of the Police Ombudsman Commission.

=== Teaching and writing ===
Dolezal has worked as an instructor at North Idaho College.

In 2015, Eastern Washington University stated that "since 2010, Rachel Dolezal has been hired at Eastern Washington University on a quarter-by-quarter basis as an instructor in the Africana Education program. This is a part-time position to address program needs. Dolezal is not a professor." She taught "The Black Woman's Struggle", "African and African American Art History", "African History", "African American Culture", and "Intro to Africana Studies". A statement by university officials on June 15, 2015, indicated that Dolezal was "no longer an employee of Eastern Washington University". Despite not being a professor, she used the title "professor" on several websites.

Dolezal was a frequent contributor to The Inlander, an alternative weekly newspaper in Spokane.

In March 2017, Dolezal released a memoir on her racial identity entitled In Full Color: Finding My Place in a Black and White World.

Dolezal later became a public school teacher for the Catalina Foothills Unified School District in Tucson, Arizona. In February 2024, Dolezal was fired for violating the district's social media policy by publishing sexually explicit imagery of herself to OnlyFans.

=== Other work ===
After her NAACP departure, Dolezal worked as a hair stylist specializing in weaves and braids. She also creates and sells her own artwork. She has stated that in the past she worked as a sushi chef. She has also produced content for OnlyFans and Cameo, where website users can request custom video greetings.

In 2026, Dolezal announced she had completed a course to become a sex therapist through the Sexology Institute.

== Racial identity ==
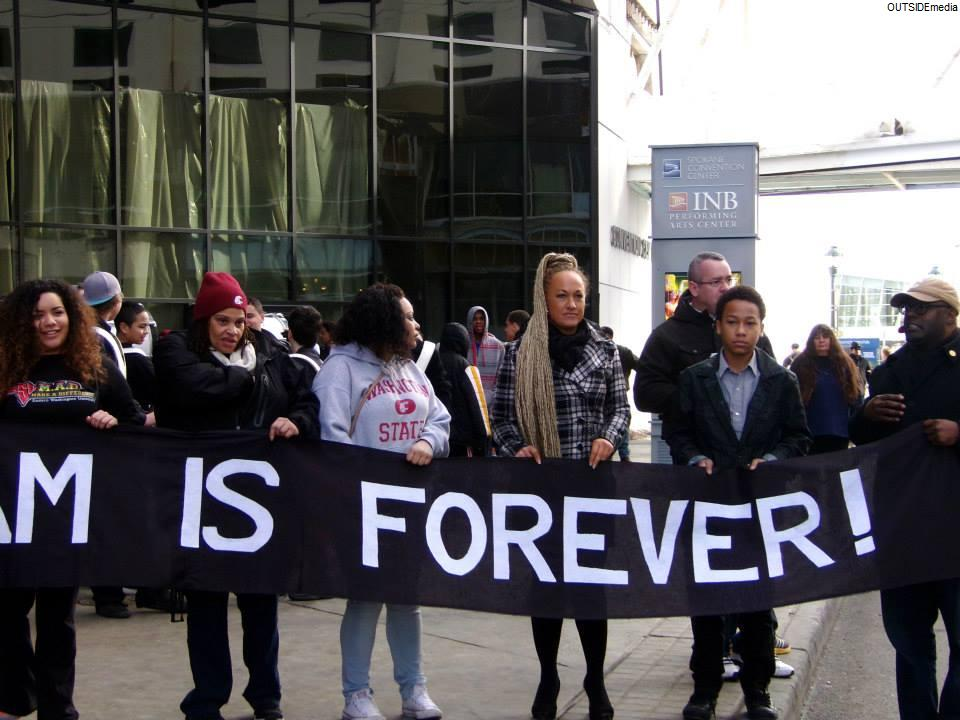
Dolezal (third from right) attends a 2015 Martin Luther King Jr. Day march holding a "MARTIN'S DREAM IS FOREVER!" sign

According to her adopted brother Ezra, Dolezal began changing her appearance as early as 2009, when she began using hair products that she had seen Ezra's biological sister use. She began darkening her skin and perming her hair sometime around 2011. When Ezra moved in with Rachel in 2012, she told him that Spokane-area residents knew her as Black and said, "Don't blow my cover."

Dolezal has claimed to be a victim of race-related harassment. Dolezal stated on September 29, 2009, to KXLY that a noose had been left on her porch. In July 2010, Dolezal resigned from Human Rights Education Institute in Kootenai County and stated to KREM 2 News that "she had been the target of discrimination". Dolezal's biography on Eastern Washington University's website stated that while she was living in Idaho, "at least eight documented hate crimes targeted (Rachel) Dolezal and her children.” Dolezal reportedly made several reports of harassment and other crimes to police in Idaho and Washington, including that she had received a hate mail package at her NAACP post office box and that a swastika was placed on the door of the Human Rights Education Institute, where she had previously worked. Regarding the hate mail package, detectives said the envelope that contained the alleged threats had no postage stamps, barcodes or any other indication of having been handled by the postal service. The postal inspector said, "The only way this letter could have ended up in this P.O. box would be if it was placed there by someone with a key to that box or a USPS employee." According to the Spokesman Review, as of 2015, none of Dolezal's allegations had resulted in an arrest or in the filing of criminal charges.

Dolezal's uncle, Dan Dolezal, has stated that his niece first claimed that a Black friend named Albert Wilkerson was her real father in 2012 or 2013. In another 2015 interview, Dolezal made reference to her "stepfather". Dolezal's mother has said she has never met Albert Wilkerson and that Dolezal does not have a stepfather. Dolezal later acknowledged that she had met Wilkerson while living in Idaho and that she considered him her "dad".

In her 2014 application for the position of chair of the Office of the Police Ombudsman Commission in Spokane, Dolezal identified herself as having several ethnicities, including Black. In an article she wrote for The Inlander in March 2015, Dolezal included herself when discussing Black women through use of the pronouns "we" and "our".

=== June 2015 news stories ===
In a June 10, 2015 interview about various alleged hate crimes that Dolezal had reported, KXLY-TV reporter Jeff Humphrey asked Dolezal about a Facebook post in which Dolezal identified Albert Wilkerson as her dad. The following is a partial transcript of the exchange:

KXLY: "Is that your dad?"

Dolezal: "Yeah, that's my dad."

KXLY: "This man right here is your father? Right there?"

Dolezal: "You have a question about that?"

KXLY: "Yes, ma'am. I was wondering if your dad really is an African-American man?"

Dolezal: "That's a very–I mean, I don't–I don't know what you're implying."

KXLY: "Are you African-American?"

Dolezal: "I don't, I don't understand the question of—I did tell you that, yes, that's my dad. And he was unable to come in January."

KXLY: "Are your parents, are they white?"

Dolezal: "I refuse."

Dolezal walks away and turns off her mic.

On June 11, Maureen Dolan and Jeff Selle of the Coeur d'Alene Press published an article entitled "Black Like Me?" The article reported that Dolezal had "made claims in the media and elsewhere about her ethnicity, race and background that are contradicted by her biological parents", and went on to outline Dolezal's past hate crimes allegations, allegations of being abused with a baboon whip by her parents, misrepresentations about her race, and misrepresentations about the identity of her father. The article further stated that Dolezal, in a 2015 interview, "maintained that she is African-American. 'They can DNA test me if they want to,' she said. 'I would caution you on all of this. This is ridiculous.'" Ruthanne Dolezal was quoted in the article, stating that her daughter's abuse allegation was "a very false and malicious lie" and adding that it was "disturbing that she has become so dishonest".

People later reported on the circumstances leading up to the publication of "Black Like Me?" According to People, Selle had learned of Dolezal's allegation that a package containing racist threats against her was delivered to the post office box of the Spokane, Washington, NAACP. Selle recalled that Dolezal had made similar allegations when she was living in Coeur d'Alene, and that the allegations were not substantiated. Sensing a potential story, Selle discovered that Dolezal had identified Wilkerson as her father; when contacted, Wilkerson contradicted this assertion. Dolan then discovered a photo of Dolezal's actual parents on the internet, and Selle made contact with them. Larry and Ruthanne Dolezal gave Selle pictures of "their naturally blond, fair-skinned daughter" and a copy of her birth certificate.

Dolezal has asserted that her parents purposely outed her as white to discredit Dolezal's allegations that her biological brother Joshua Dolezal had molested their adopted sibling. For their part, Dolezal's parents have contended that "Rachel orchestrated the sexual abuse accusations against her brother" in an effort to win custody of her adopted brother, Izaiah.

The controversy surrounding Dolezal's ancestry and identity made national and international news. On June 12, 2015, The New York Times published an article entitled "NAACP Leader Rachel Dolezal Posed as Black, Parents Say". On June 20, 2015, People published an article entitled "Inside Story: How Rachel Dolezal's Cover as a Black Woman Was Blown". Also on June 20, NBC published an article entitled "Rachel Dolezal Scandal Exposes Fractured Family".

==== Reactions to the controversy ====
After the controversy regarding Dolezal's deception became public, the NAACP released a statement in support of her leadership. However, a petition calling for her to resign her position as President of the Spokane chapter of the NAACP was launched. Dolezal stepped down from her position at the NAACP on June 15, 2015.

An investigation into Dolezal's behavior as chair of the Office of the Police Ombudsman Commission in Spokane concluded that she had engaged in "a pattern of misconduct". On June 18, 2015, the Spokane City Council voted unanimously to remove Dolezal from her position as chair.

On June 15, 2015, The Inlander (a publication to which Dolezal had contributed) announced that it had cut ties with Dolezal, saying that they felt "manipulated and deceived".

The revelations about Dolezal's ancestry and her other claims provoked a range of reactions. Dolezal's critics argued that she committed cultural appropriation and fraud. However, others said that Dolezal's asserted identity should be respected. Angela Schwendiman, a colleague of Dolezal's at Eastern Washington University, expressed her belief that Dolezal perceived herself as Black internally, and that "she was only trying to match how she felt on the inside with her outside". Similarly Cedric Bradley, a colleague of hers at Spokane's NAACP, suggested it mattered little to him whether Dolezal was actually Black or not. What did matter to him was her proven track record in social justice work. "It's not about [B]lack and white", Bradley stated, "it's about what we can do for the community". Historian Barbara J. Fields and sociologist Karen Fields, authors of Racecraft, considered the episode to be a media circus and pointed out that many of the NAACP's early leaders were white or passed as white.

In June 2015, psychologist Halford Fairchild asserted, "Rachel Dolezal is [B]lack because she identifies as [B]lack. Her identity was authentic, as far as I could tell." Sociologist Ann Morning also defended Dolezal, saying: "We're getting more and more used to the idea that people's racial affiliation and identity and sense of belonging can change, or can vary, with different circumstances." Washington Post journalist Krissah Thompson described her behavior as "white guilt played to its end". Thompson discussed the issue with psychologist Derald Wing Sue, an expert on racial identity, who suggested that Dolezal had become so fascinated by racism and racial justice issues that she "over-identified" with Black people.

Gender studies scholar Samantha Allen said, "Rachel Dolezal seems determined to appropriate not just Blackness but the rhetoric of transgender identity as well" and called the analogy "spurious". Washington Post journalist Jonathan Capehart wrote that "blackface remains highly racist, no matter how down with the cause a white person is". Ezra Dolezal also compared his sister's behavior to blackface and said, "She's basically creating more racism."

In December 2017, Shawn Vestal of The Spokesman-Review called Dolezal "Spokane's undisputed heavyweight champion of racial appropriation".

The Dolezal case led to a debate in scholarship as to whether transracial identity can be compared to transgender identity.

On news outlets and social media, Dolezal has been compared to Sacheen Littlefeather, a half-Mexican American woman who passed as Native American and took the stage on the 1973 45th Academy Awards (the Oscars); the comparison is based on the fact that both women falsely self-identified with a culture or ethnicity that was not theirs, together with the allegation that they did so for personal gain and promotion.

==== Responses from Dolezal ====
Dolezal has asserted that her self-identification is genuine, even though it is not based on ancestry.

Dolezal issued a statement on June 15, 2015, asserting that "challenging the construct of race is at the core of evolving human consciousness". The following day, Dolezal told Today Show host Matt Lauer she was first described as "transracial" and "biracial" in articles about her human rights work, and chose not to correct them. In the same interview, she said the way she presented herself was "not some freak, Birth of a Nation, mockery blackface performance". Dolezal later said that she has never claimed to be "transracial", a term associated mainly with transracial adoption. In a March 27, 2017, interview Dolezal said she identified as "trans-Black".

Dolezal alleged that the Spokane police chief had tired of dealing with her, and that he had asked a private investigator to find out more information on her; while the private investigator in question (Ted Pulver) acknowledged having investigated Dolezal, both he and the attorney for the police chief denied that the police chief had hired Pulver.

In subsequent interviews, Dolezal stated that she considered herself to be Black. In a November 2, 2015, interview on The Real, Dolezal publicly acknowledged for the first time since the controversy began that she was "biologically born white to white parents", but maintained that she identified as Black.

In a February 2017 interview with The Guardian, Dolezal reasoned that race is more fluid than gender because race is an entirely social construct. She stated, "I feel that I was born with the essential essence of who I am, whether it matches my anatomy and complexion or not ... I've never questioned being a girl or woman, for example, but whiteness has always felt foreign to me, for as long as I can remember." She added, "I didn't choose to feel this way or be this way, I just am. What other choice is there than to be exactly who we are?" Critics took issue with Dolezal's logic. The Guardian columnist Claire Hynes wrote, "Dolezal is correct to argue that race is largely a social construct rather than a science", but "what defines people of colour is a limited ability to control how we are viewed, and a lack of freedom to 'write our own stories'."

Hired in August 2023, Dolezai taught part-time as an after-school extended day instructor and substitute teacher at the Catalina Foothills Unified School District in Tucson, Arizona. She was fired in February 2024 after district officials discovered her OnlyFans Account.

== Trivia ==
In 2015, Dolezal declined the interracial porn website DogFart's offer of fifty thousand dollars to film four sex scenes.

In 2016, Deborah Theaker played a parody of Dolezal on Lady Dynamite.

In 2018, a documentary entitled The Rachel Divide aired. The film was directed by Laura Brownson and distributed by Netflix. The documentary explored Dolezal's 2015 racial identity controversy, the circumstances surrounding it, and its aftermath. The documentary received mixed reviews. Vogue gave the filmmaker credit for "balanced treatment of her deeply problematic subject matter". The New Yorker noted the film's portrait of family dynamics. "Eventually, Brownson locates the real story: a primitive power game between mother and child, one that forecasts calamity. And it is in this mode that The Rachel Divide becomes a disturbing and enthralling drama of the American family, the pain of its truths and its fictions."

In June 2015, actress and comedian Maya Rudolph did an impression of Dolezal on Late Night with Seth Meyers.

Saturday Night Live Weekend Update co-host Michael Che made a joke about Dolezal during a May 2018 segment. While discussing the Mueller investigation, Che said, "'It's not every day a Black man can root for the feds, but I'm really enjoying this. I feel like I'm watching Rachel Dolezal get kicked out of a Starbucks. I'm for that'".

In a November 2021 Saturday Night Live sketch featuring a game show called "Republican or Not", hosted by Kenan Thompson, the Liz Cheney character (portrayed by Cecily Strong) was compared to Rachel Dolezal. When Cheney insisted she was a Republican, Thompson's character responded: "You might tell everybody that, but it's not what other Republicans say. Like it or not, you are the Rachel Dolezal of the Republican Party".

Dolezal was referenced in a November 2025 Saturday Night Live Weekend Update focused on disgraced former U.S. Representative George Santos. The Santos character (played by Bowen Yang) claimed to be Black. After co-host Colin Jost accused him of lying, Yang replied, "'Wow, are you accusing me of lying about my race? Like Rachel Dolezal? That horrible woman who lied about being Black? Remember her? Because that was me'".

A character based on Dolezal was also portrayed in a fictional Broadway show in the series finale of Younger.

The main character of Mithu Sanyal's 2021 novel Identitti is modeled after Dolezal.

In October 2022, the UK Channel 4 show Jimmy Carr Destroys Art, the option to destroy Dolezal's sculpture Misaligned Mind or John Leech's cartoon Dis-united States was put to an audience vote. They chose Misaligned Mind.

== Personal life ==
In 2000, Dolezal married Kevin Moore, a Black man. Moore, a medical student at Howard University at the time of their marriage, divorced Dolezal in 2004. Dolezal and Moore have a son. She identifies as bisexual.

In 2010, with the consent of her parents, Dolezal obtained legal guardianship of her 16-year-old adopted brother, Izaiah Dolezal. Izaiah sought to be emancipated after alleging that Larry and Ruthanne not only beat him and his siblings, but also threatened to send them to group homes if they did not obey their rules. Their brother Ezra later denied Izaiah's accusations in an interview with CNN. In an interview with BuzzFeed, Ezra acknowledged that his parents were strict and sometimes used corporal punishment.

Dolezal gave birth to another son in February 2016.

According to a February 2015 article in The Easterner, Dolezal said she had suffered from cervical cancer in 2006, but had recovered by 2008. Ezra Dolezal has stated that he does not believe this to be true.

In October 2016, Dolezal legally changed her name to Nkechi Amare Diallo, a Nigerian phrase meaning "gift of God". She later clarified that she still intends to use the name Rachel Dolezal "as her public persona", but that she changed her name to have a better chance of landing work.

=== Welfare fraud ===
In February 2017, Dolezal was receiving food stamps. She said she was on the brink of homelessness and unable to find employment.

In May 2018, Dolezal was charged with second-degree perjury and felony theft by welfare fraud by the Washington State Department of Social and Health Services. The charges were filed after it was revealed that she had received $8,847 in food and childcare assistance between August 2015 and December 2017. During that period, she had received tens of thousands of dollars in unreported income, but had told the state that her income was less than $500 per month. State investigators discovered that, after her book was published, approximately $83,924 had been deposited into her bank account in monthly installments between August 2015 and September 2017. According to the Spokane County prosecutor's office, Dolezal could have received a sentence of up to 15 years in prison if she was found guilty. She entered into a diversion agreement on March 25, 2019, agreeing to repay her assistance benefits and complete 120 hours of community service to avoid a trial.

== See also ==
- Cultural appropriation
- Hypatia transracialism controversy
- Marie Sophie Hingst
- Sacheen Littlefeather
- Andrea Smith
- Martina Big
- Jessica Krug
- Racial misrepresentation
