= Hengameh Yaghoobifarah =

German-Iranian journalist and author

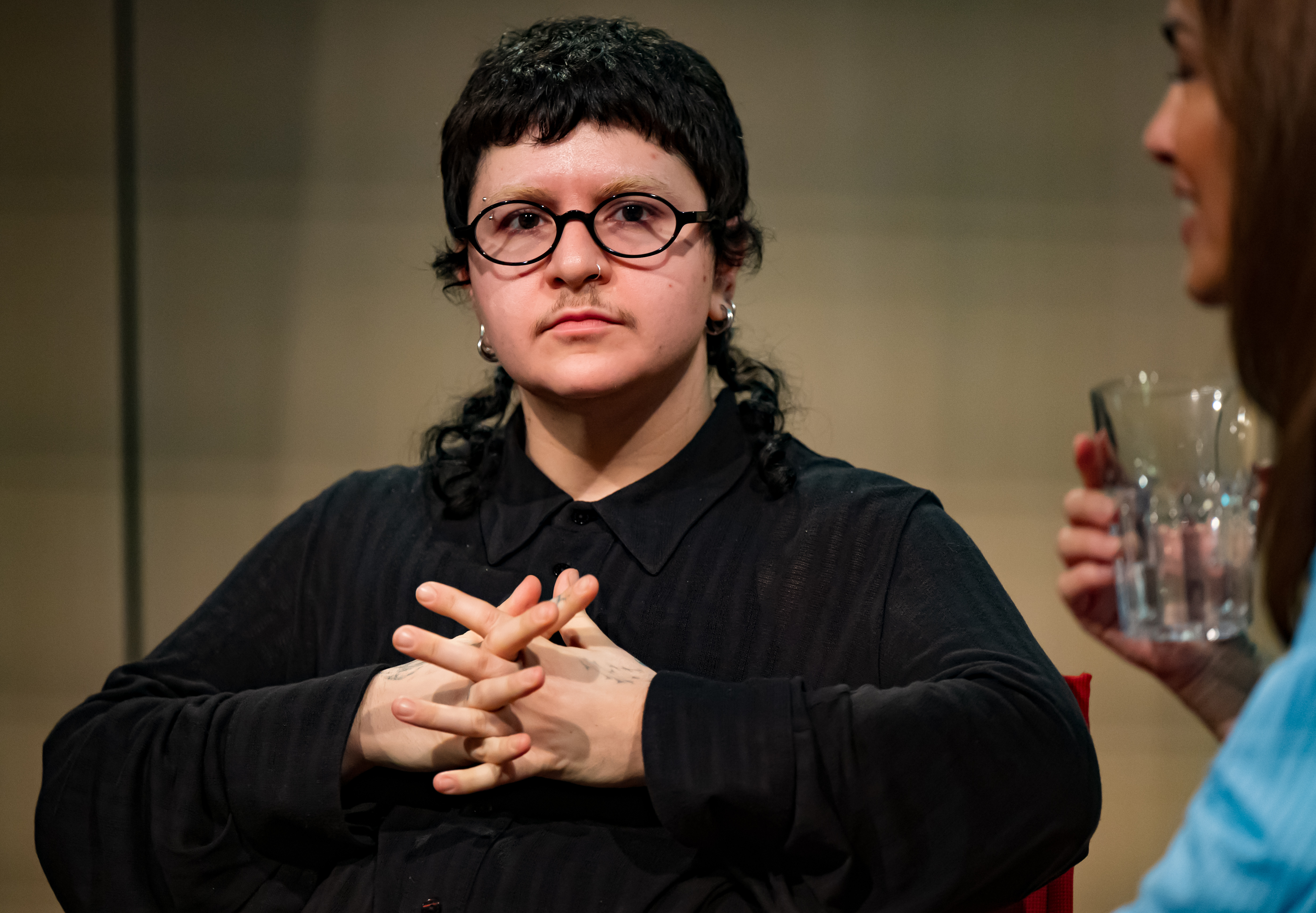
- Yaghoobifarah in 2026
- Born: 1991 (age 34–35); Kiel, Schleswig-Holstein, Germany
- Citizenship: German
- Notable work: Abschaffung der Polizei: All cops are berufsunfähig (2020); Eure Heimat ist unser Albtraum (2019)
- Political party: The Left (since 2024)

Hengameh Yaghoobifarah (Note: Persian: هنگامه یعقوبی‌فرح) (born 1991) is a German-Iranian non-binary journalist and author.

== Personal life ==
Yaghoobifarah was born in Kiel to Iranian parents, both academics, but grew up in Buchholz in der Nordheide near Hamburg. During middle school, Yaghoobifarah started viewing themself as left-wing and joined 'solid, the youth organization of The Left. They would later study media studies and Scandinavian studies at the University of Freiburg and Linköping University where, in 2014, they acquired their bachelor's degree with a thesis on the color pink in feminist discourse. Yaghoobifarah moved to Berlin in 2014 and has lived there since.

Yaghoobifarah is non-binary and uses the English singular pronoun they, and no pronouns in German.

== Activism and work ==
Yaghoobifarah works as a contributing editor for the feminist Missy Magazine, as well as having freelanced for multiple other publications such as Spex, an.schläge, Migazine, and bento; while also maintaining a personal column named Habibitus in taz. Yaghoobifarah also ran a personal blog, named QUEER VANITY, about fashion and politics between 2014 and 2017.

The main focus of their works lies on the topics of queer theory, feminism, anti-racism, pop culture, aesthetics, body positivity, intersectionality, and anti-fascism.

Yaghoobifarah was a speaker at the 2017 European Lesbian* Conference on the place that lesbians are given in popular media. Yaghoobifarah has also held several lectures on feminism and anti-racism at various universities in Germany.

In 2019, Yaghoobifarah published their first book, Eure Heimat ist unser Albtraum (transl. Your homeland is our nightmare), in cooperation with Fatma Aydemir and 14 other German authors, including Sasha Marianna Salzmann, Sharon Dodua Otoo, Max Czollek, Mithu Sanyal, Margarete Stokowski, Olga Grjasnowa, Reyhan Şahin, and Simone Dede Ayivi. The book is described as a manifesto and primarily consists of a collection of essays by the different authors. It focuses on topics of racism, discrimination, and nationalism; seeking to deconstruct an 'ethnic and antisemitic' German understanding of Heimat (roughly: Homeland). The book was translated into English in 2021.

Yaghoobifarah published their debut novel, Ministerium der Träume (transl. Ministry of dreams), in 2021. It tells the story of the life of Iranian teenagers in Germany being faced with racism and the xenophobic attacks of the late '90s. Their second novel Schwindel (transl. Dizzy) came out in 2024, "a wonderfully messy open-air chamber drama and a bold addition to the canon of queer literature".

Together with Fatma Aydemir, Enrico Ippolito and Miryam Schellbach, Yaghoobifarah funded the German literary magazine Delfi. Magazin für neue Literatur.

Yaghoobifarah joined the political party The Left in January 2024.

== Controversies and criticism ==
=== Cultural appropriation and racism ===
In the Article Fusion Revisited: Karneval der Kulturlosen (English: Fusion Revisited: Carnival of the cultureless), published in Missy Magazine, Yaghoobifarah accused the Fusion Festival and its 'white audience' of racism and cultural appropriation. Among other things, they criticized the mild spicing of food and the wearing of dreadlocks. The article was strongly criticized by parts of the German left at the time, as some viewed Yaghoobifarah's argumentation as reminiscent of talking points used by the New Right as well as a justification of ethnopluralism.

In October 2017, Yaghoobifarah published the article Deutsche, schafft Euch ab! (English: Germans, abolish yourselves!), in taz with a title and conclusion in reference to the book Germany Abolishes Itself by Thilo Sarrazin. In the article, they consistently use the derogatory epithet Kartoffel to refer to Germans, who are spoken of negatively. They also labeled the culture of Germans as dirty ('Dreckskultur'), in reference to the aforementioned epithet. The article closes with a sentence stating the Germans are abolishing themselves, and that Yaghoobifarah hopes they hurry up in doing so. The journalist Jan Fleischhauer criticized the article and those that praised it for holding a double standard, viewing such publications as incompatible with the goals of anti-racism. The journalist Elke Halefeldt also criticized the article for hypocrisy and commented in saying "So we learnt: racism against Germans isn't racism". A group of ten issued a complaint to the German press council which accused the article of extreme racism and hate speech which they perceived as falling under the laws pertaining to Volksverhetzung, the press council rejected the claim however, stating that the article is merely a statement of opinion.

=== "All cops are berufsunfähig" ===
In the article Abschaffung der Polizei: All cops are berufsunfähig (English: Abolition of the police: All cops are unfit for work), Yaghoobifarah made reference to the international Black Lives Matter movement and aimed to write a satirical article addressing racism in the Police, which they claimed is also present in Germany. The title is a reference to the abbreviation 'ACAB' (All cops are bastards), the same abbreviation also being used in the print version. The article presents a thought experiment about where police officers could work if the police were abolished. It concludes with the statement:

Off the top of my head there is only one suitable option that comes to mind: the landfill. Not as garbage collectors with keys to houses, but in the dump, where they are surrounded by garbage. They should certainly feel most comfortable among their kind.

The article was heavily criticized in the German media. Some journalists and politicians viewed it as equating humans with garbage, and some even understood it as a case of Volksverhetzung or 'group-based misanthropy' against police officers. Schlecky Silberstein defended the article in Deutschlandfunk Kultur, saying that the article was good satire and that critics simply didn't understand it.

The two German police unions, Deutsche Polizeigewerkschaft and Gewerkschaft der Polizei, announced that they were filing a criminal report against Yaghoobifarah, upon which the Berlin Police president Barbara Slowik issued an internal letter to all officers where she pointed to German freedom of speech laws as well as past court decisions on slogans such as ACAB. The federal minister of the Interior at the time, Horst Seehofer, also announced to file a criminal report against Yaghoobifarah, but decided against it after public backlash. German president Frank-Walter Steinmeier also criticized the article.

There was also internal criticism within the editorial staff of taz. Bettina Gaus for example, accused Yaghoobifarah of disregarding human dignity for clickbait.

After having received hate and threats for their article, Yaghoobifarah decided to seek police protection, which some viewed as hypocritical.

== Selected publications ==
- Schwindel, 2024, Aufbau-Verlag, ISBN 9783351051235
- Delfi. Magazin für neue Literatur, 2023, Ullstein Verlag, ISBN 9783546100908
- Unverpackt, radio play, 2023, WDR 5
- Habibitus, 2023, Aufbau-Verlag, ISBN 9783841231192
- Ministerium der Träume, 2021, Aufbau-Verlag, ISBN 9783841226853
- With Fatma Aydemir: Eure Heimat ist unser Albtraum, 2020, Ullstein Taschenbuch, ISBN 9783843720427
