= Jiří Doležal =

Jiří Doležal may refer to:

- Jiří Doležal (ice hockey, born 1963), Czech ice hockey player
- Jiří Doležal (ice hockey, born 1985), Czech ice hockey player
