= Petra Mattheis =

German Artist und Photographer (born 1967)

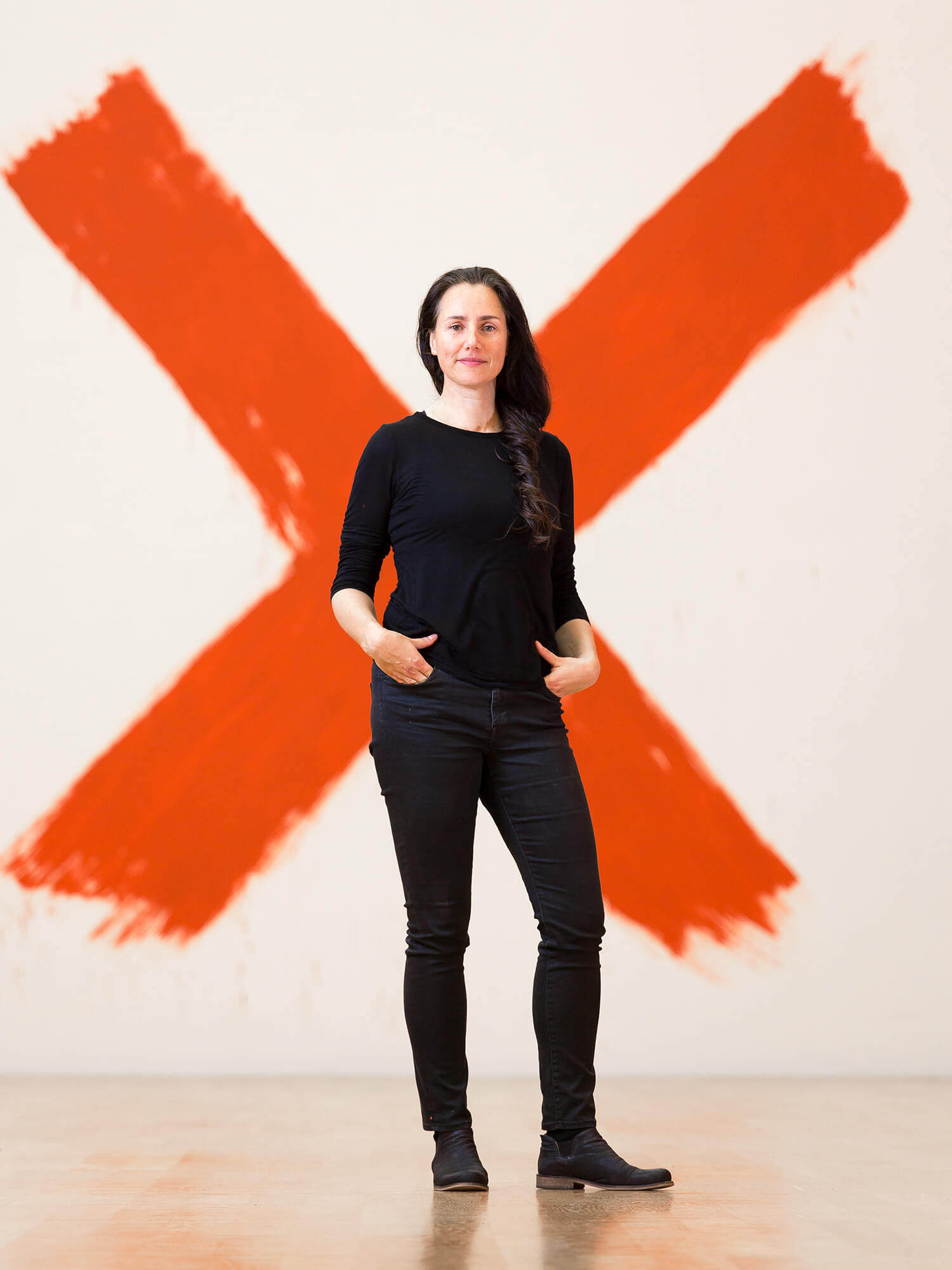
- Petra Mattheis, Leipzig, Germany, 2017
- Born: Moers, Germany
- Education: Hochschule für Grafik und Buchkunst Leipzig

Petra Mattheis (born 1967 in Moers) is a German Artist und Photographer. She became known for her artistic engagement with the topic menstruation.

== Biography ==
Mattheis studied communications design at the University of Applied Sciences Wiesbaden and graduated in 1994 with a diploma. She studied Fine Arts at the Akademie für Bildende Künste Mainz from 2002 to 2006 and finished with a diploma as well. From 2007 bis 2009 she was a student in the master class of Joachim Blank at the Hochschule für Grafik und Buchkunst Leipzig.

== Works ==
With her website Become A Menstruator as well as with installations and prints, Mattheis investigates menstruation in an artistic, playful approach, questions cultural-historical developments and today's way of dealing with one's own body in our society. Each motif of the blood-red prints in her series BAM – Become a Menstruator corresponds to a fertile year in the life of the artist. While each print is a handmaid original, the size of the edition corresponds with the sum of the periods she had during this year. Thus, Mattheis not only addresses a taboo, her works also receive an autobiographical character.

== Solo exhibitions ==
- 2006: Überwiegend Schwarz auf Weiß, Nassauischer Kunstverein Wiesbaden
- 2009: Pulsierender Pfirsich, Kuhturm, Leipzig
- 2011: Hinter den Worten, Gallery Queen Anne, Tapetenwerk, Leipzig
- 2015: Arts and Crafts Week at Panty Camp, Gallery The Grass is Greener, Leipzig
- 2017: Riding the Red Tide, Museum der bildenden Künste, Leipzig
- 2018: Become a Menstruator Booth, Museum der bildenden Künste, Leipzig
- 2019: Shark Weeks, Atelierfrankfurt, Frankfurt
- 2022: Wantalon App, Parcours #zeitzseeing
- 2023: Am Fluß, Kalktor, Zeitz

== Selected group exhibitions ==
- 2004: Zwischen, Nassauischer Kunstverein Wiesbaden, with Ilka Meyer
- 2011: East of Fresno, group exhibition for contemporary art, The Hatchery Art Space, Badger, California
- 2012: Schläft ein Lied in allen Dingen, Bellevuesaal with Klaus Lomnitzer, Wiesbaden

== Awards and scholarships ==
- 2006: Förderstipendium der Johannes Gutenberg-Universität Mainz
- 2007: Preis der Johannes Gutenberg-Universität Mainz
- 2016: Project grant from the state of Rhineland-Palatinate
- 2021: Denkzeit-Stipendium, Kulturstiftung des Freistaates Sachsen
- 2022: Modul C, BBK Innovative Kunstprojekte Projektförderung
- 2022: Neustart Kultur, Stipendium
- 2022: Work grant, Stiftung Kunstfonds
- 2023: Award for "Gespräche über Kohle" (Conversations about coal)
- 2023: Project funding for Parcour "Schatten" (Zeitz) of the Wantalon App, Kunststiftung Sachsen-Anhalt

== Publications ==
- Nassauischer Kunstverein e.V.: Petra Mattheis und Ilka Meyer. Catalog of the exhibition Zwischen – Petra Mattheis, Ilka Meyer, 9 May to 13 June and 29 June to 11 July 2004; Part of the exhibition series Perspektiven der Zukunft. With contributions by Christian Rabanus, Botho Strauß and Ilka Meyer. NKV, Wiesbaden 2004
- Mithu Sanyal: Vulva, Die Enthüllung des unsichtbaren Geschlechts, Verlag Klaus Wagenbach, 2017, S. 202–203, S. 210
- Barbara Streidl: feminismus, Reclam-Verlag, 2019, S. 12–13
- Mithu Sanyal: Identitti, consonni Verlag, Spanien, 2023, Titelcover
- MDR Documentary by Maksym Melnyk „East“: Accompanying the development of „Am Fluß“, Zeitz 2023
