= In Full Color (memoir) =

2017 memoir by Rachel Dolezal

In Full Color: Finding My Place in a Black and White World
- Author: Rachel Dolezal and Storms Reback
- Genre: Autobiography
- Publisher: BenBella Books
- Publication date: 2017
- Publication place: United States
- Media type: Print
- Pages: 304
- ISBN: 978-1-944648-16-9 (Hardcover)
- OCLC: 954670830

In Full Color: Finding My Place in a Black and White World is a memoir by American activist Rachel Dolezal, known for presenting herself as a black woman while having no known black ancestry. It was published in 2017 by BenBella Books, almost two years after the controversy about her racial identity in June 2015. The Guardian reported that 30 publishing houses turned down the manuscript before BenBella Books printed it in March 2017.

== Summary ==
In Full Color is an overview of Dolezal's life with an emphasis on how she came to identify as black. Dolezal begins by describing her upbringing by "fundamentalist Christian" parents in the foothills of the Rocky Mountains in Montana, United States. From an early age, she describes being fascinated with Africa and African culture. While Dolezal was a teenager her parents, Larry and Ruthanne Dolezal, adopted four African-American children. Dolezal describes that "while I was teaching my younger siblings about Black culture and history: I began to feel even more connected to it myself. I began to see the world through Black eyes and anything that had to do with Blackness or Africa always grabbed my attention."

Dolezal describes how difficult it became to communicate how she identified herself.

Understanding how miseducation about race and the cultural boundaries and codes that have been put into place in American society might conflict with my true nature, I decided that the most honest and real way for me to live was to be Black without any explanations, reservations, apologies, or room for negotiation. It had taken me so many years to finally embrace who I was and love myself that I didn't want my understandings of myself to be muddled by other people's perceptions of misunderstandings.

Dolezal became a self-described "academic activist" joining the local chapter of the NAACP and serving on a police oversight board.

== Reception ==
In Full Color had a mixed reception. Brian Josephs from Spin wrote that "her writing lacks the empathy required to sell herself as, in her words, 'a fully conscious, woke soul sista.'" Baz Dreisinger's highly critical review in The Washington Post said that: "Dolezal's conception of blackness is steeped in a fetishizing of struggle, pain and oppression." Jazmine Steele from Sojourners wrote that "Rachel is portrayed to be a highly intelligent and creative person," but ultimately describes her as "something like a false prophet for racial reconciliation".

== See also ==
- The Rachel Divide
- Black Lives Matter
