= Horka nad Moravou =

- Municipality
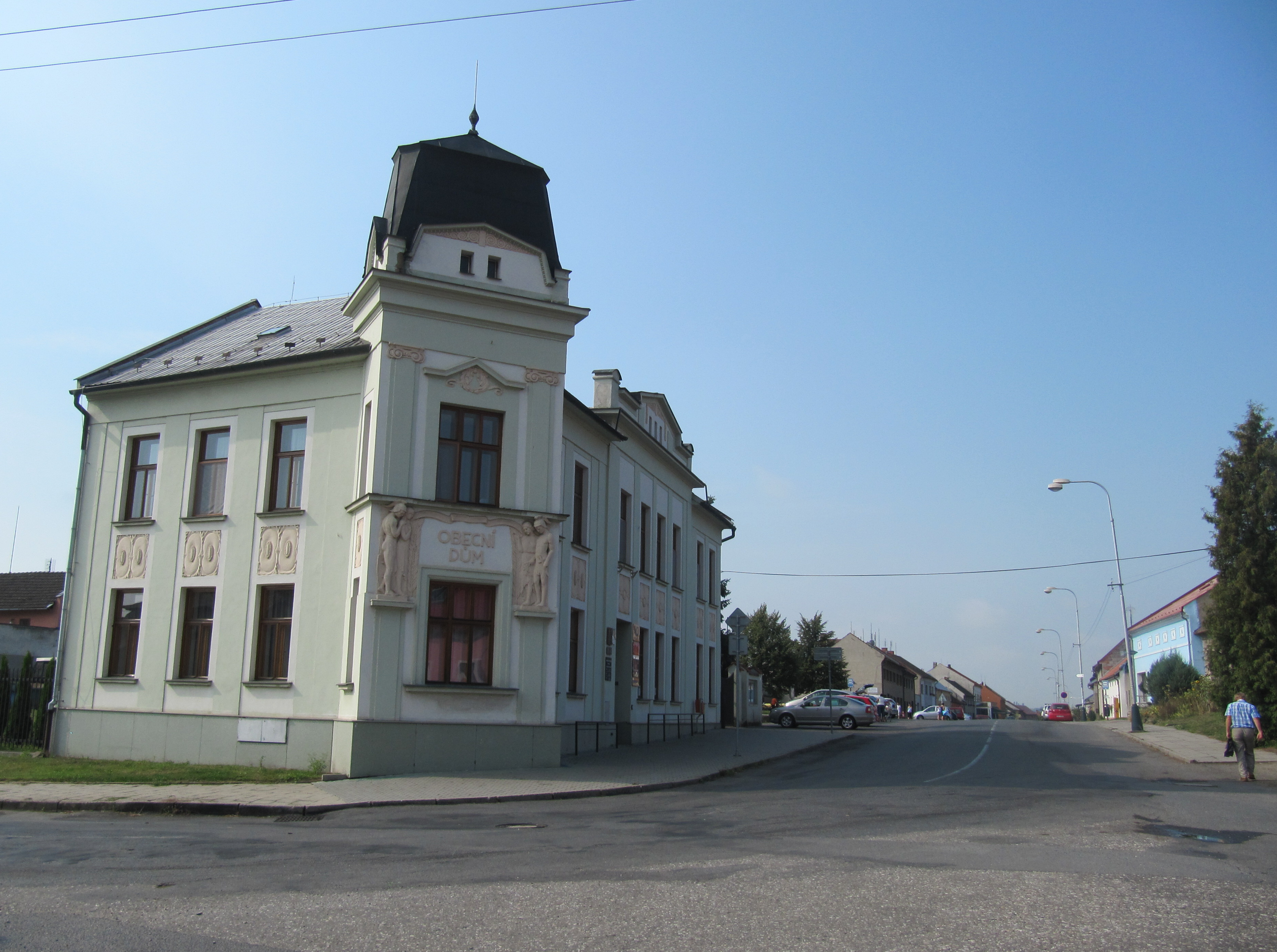
- Centre of Horka nad Moravou

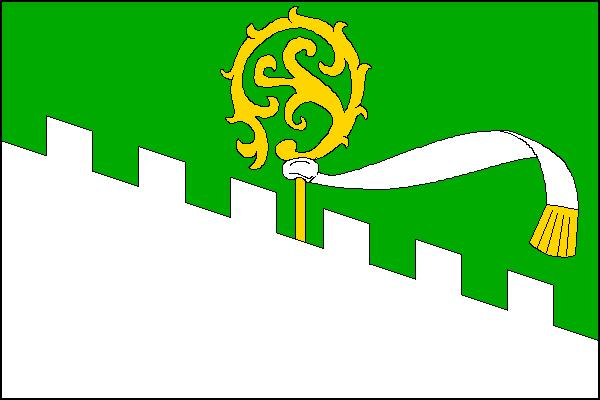
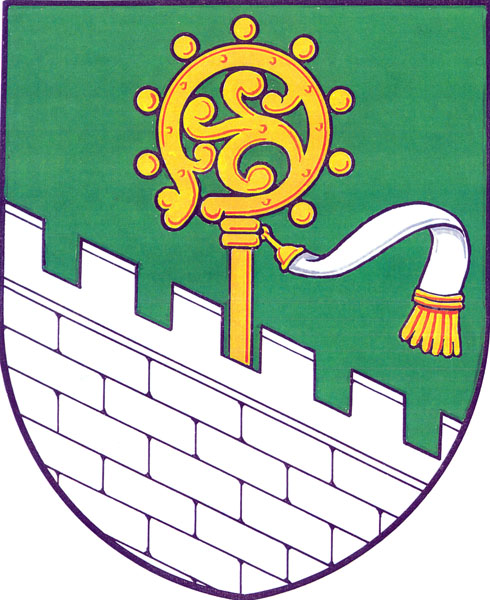
- Flag Coat of arms

- Location in the Czech Republic
- Coordinates: 49°38′24″N 17°12′39″E
- Country: Czech Republic
- Region: Olomouc
- District: Olomouc
- First mentioned: 1250

Area
  - Total: 11.93 km^{2} (4.61 sq mi)
- Elevation: 220 m (720 ft)

Population (2026-01-01)
  - Total: 2,659
  - Density: 222.9/km^{2} (577.3/sq mi)
- Time zone: UTC+1 (CET)
  - Summer (DST): UTC+2 (CEST)
- Postal code: 783 35
- Website: www.horka.cz

Horka nad Moravou is a municipality and village in Olomouc District in the Olomouc Region of the Czech Republic. It has about 2,700 inhabitants.

== Geography ==
Horka nad Moravou is located about 5 kilometres (3 mi) north of Olomouc. It lies in a flat landscape in the Upper Morava Valley. The market town is situated on the right bank of the Morava River. A large part of the municipal territory lies within the Litovelské Pomoraví Protected Landscape Area.

== History ==
The first written mention of Horka nad Moravou is from 1250. The village was the site of a castle, which was destroyed in the 16th century. From 1533 until the establishment of a sovereign municipality in 1848, Horka nad Moravou was owned by the city of Olomouc.

== Demographics ==
Historical population

Year	Pop.	±%
1869	1,196	—
1880	1,300	+8.7%
1890	1,427	+9.8%
1900	1,406	−1.5%
1910	1,522	+8.3%

Year	Pop.	±%
1921	1,494	−1.8%
1930	1,837	+23.0%
1950	1,884	+2.6%
1961	2,152	+14.2%
1970	2,160	+0.4%

Year	Pop.	±%
1980	2,132	−1.3%
1991	2,054	−3.7%
2001	2,056	+0.1%
2011	2,336	+13.6%
2021	2,525	+8.1%

Source: Censuses

== Transport ==
Horka nad Moravou is located on the railway line Olomouc–Drahanovice.

== Sights ==
The main landmark of Horka nad Moravou is the Church of Saint Nicholas. It was built in the Baroque style in 1753.

== Notable people ==
- Rudolf Doležal (1916–2002), sculptor
