= Jan Doležal =

Jan Doležal may refer to:

- Jan Doležal (decathlete) (born 1996), Czech decathlete
- Jan Doležal (fencer), Czech competitor in Men's sabre at the 2013 World Fencing Championships
- Jan Doležal (footballer) (born 1993), Croatian footballer

== See also ==
- Doležal
