= Sharon Dodua Otoo =

British writer, opinion journalist and activist (born 1972)

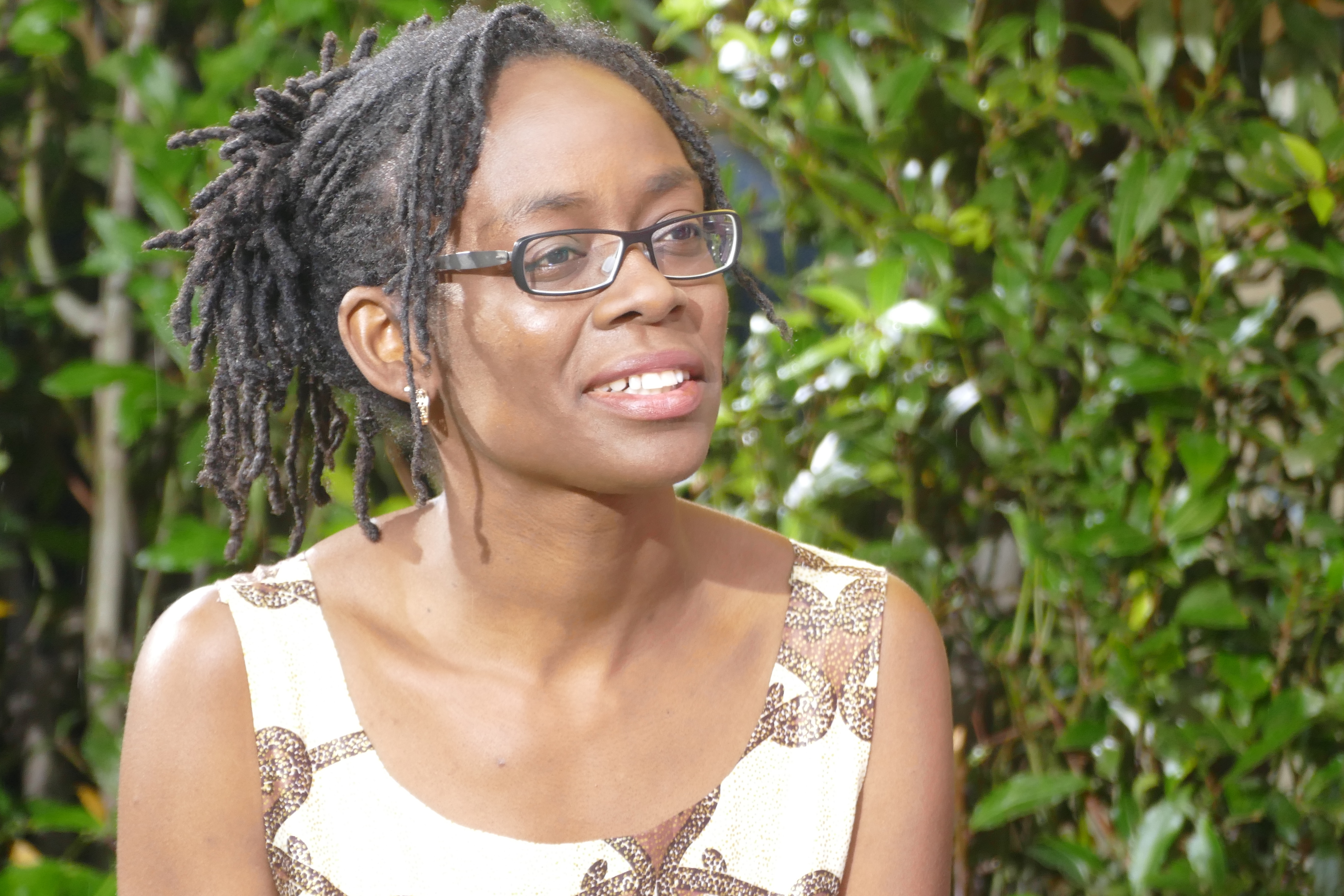
- Otoo after receiving the Ingeborg Bachmann Prize (2016)
- Born: 1972 (age 53–54); Ilford, London, England
- Education: Royal Holloway, University of London
- Occupations: Writer, activist
- Website: Official website

Sharon Dodua Otoo (born 1972) is a British writer, publicist and activist. In 2016, Otoo was awarded the Ingeborg Bachmann Prize for her first short story in the German language.

== Life ==
Sharon Otoo was born in Ilford, London. Her parents were both originally from Accra, Ghana, before moving to Ilford, London, where Otoo was born and grew up. Otoo has two siblings. After completing her schooling, she travelled in 1992 to Hanover, where she stayed for a year to work as an au pair and developed an interest in the German language.

On her return, Otoo studied German and Management Studies at Royal Holloway, University of London, and graduated with a BA (Hons) in 1997. After graduating from Royal Holloway, she returned to Germany, where she has lived in Berlin since 2006 with her four sons.

In an interview with The Guardian newspaper in 2016, Otoo described herself as a "Black British mother, activist, author and editor" and spoke of having mixed feelings towards Britain. "I have a British passport and London is my home," she said, "but there was still this something in the background music that said: 'You don't really belong here'."

In 2021, she was elected a visiting fellow of Jesus College, Cambridge, occupying the post of Schroeder Writer-in-Residence for the 2021–2022 academic year.

== Activism ==
As an activist, Otoo has been involved with the Initiative for Black People in Germany (Initiative Schwarze Menschen in Deutschland (ISD-Bund), co-founded by May Ayim), serving on the board of directors between 2010 and 2013 as well as a number of other groups. She edits the English-language book series Witnessed and has published numerous politically engaged articles on the subjects of culture, diversity and feminism.

In her Guardian interview of 2016 she explained: "Politics can be very polarising and confrontational. With my writing, I would like to say: we can go out and demonstrate, but at the end of the day all we all want is to be understood and be treated with empathy."

Since 2014, she has worked as a project coordinator for the Regionale Arbeitsstelle Berlin, an organisation which furthers the social integration and development of children of immigrant families from their early schooling up to professional training.

== Writing ==
Otoo's first novella was entitled the things i am thinking while smiling politely [sic], published in February 2012 by Edition Assemblage, a small left-wing German publisher. This was followed in 2014 by another novella, Synchronicity. Both works were originally written in English and translated into German by Mirjam Nuenning. She wrote her first novel, Adas Raum, in German. It was translated into English by Jon Cho-Polizzi.

Otoo's creative writing encompasses magical realism, Afrofuturism, identity issues, relationships and empowerment. She cites German-language writers such as Bertolt Brecht and Max Frisch as inspiration, for "combining sharp analysis of society with humour", as well as Toni Morrison and Mildred D. Taylor, "women writers who made the black experience in the US very tangible to me".

== The Ingeborg Bachmann Prize 2016 ==
Otoo was invited to take part in the 2016 Ingeborg Bachmann Prize competition by Frankfurter Allgemeine editor Sandra Kegel. At the time Otoo said she was not aware of the prize's significance in the German-speaking world. "That was probably a good idea," she said, "otherwise I wouldn't have submitted anything."

Otoo's winning entry was "Herr Gröttrup setzte sich hin" ("Herr Gröttrup sat down"), the story of engineer and V2 rocket-scientist Helmut Gröttrup and his wife Irmgard sitting down to breakfast. Herr Gröttrup's breakfast egg takes over the narration and rebels against the orderly household by remaining soft despite being boiled for the regulation seven and a half minutes: and so commences a story hailed for its 'changeling' character, gentle satire and humour.

The award was presented by the Mayor of Klagenfurt, Maria Luise Mathiasschitz, who praised Otoo as "a new voice for a new society". When questioned by The Guardian whether the award represented the jury's desire to make a stand against the growing xenophobia and right-wing populism in Europe, Otoo said it might have played a part, "but I think in the end they voted for the quality of the story".

The award has a prize of 25,000 Euros and Otoo has said that she intends to use the opportunity to write her first full-length novel.

== Selected works ==
=== Novels ===
- Otoo, Sharon Dodua (2021), Adas Raum. Novel. Frankfurt am Main: S. Fischer. ISBN 978-3-10-397315-0

=== Novellas ===
- Otoo, Sharon Dodua (2012), the things i am thinking while smiling politely. Novella. Münster: Edition Assemblage. ISBN 978-3-942885-22-5
- Otoo, Sharon Dodua (2013), die dinge, die ich denke während ich höflich lächle. Translated into German by Mirjam Nuenning. Münster: Edition Assemblage. ISBN 978-3-942885-39-3
- Otoo, Sharon Dodua (2014), Synchronicity. Novella. Illustrated by Sita Ngoumou. Translated into German by Mirjam Nuenning. Münster: Edition Assemblage. ISBN 978-3-942885-74-4
- Otoo, Sharon Dodua (2015), Synchronicity. The Original Story, Münster: Edition Assemblage. ISBN 978-3-942885-95-9

=== Short stories ===
- Otoo, Sharon Dodua (2011), Die Geschichte vom Kreis und Viereck, in Susan Arndt and Nadja Ofuatey-Alazard (eds) (K)Erben des Kolonialismus im Wissenschaftsarchiv deutsche Sprache. Münster: Unrast Verlag, p. 378
- Otoo, Sharon Dodua (2015), Wie bei den Pinguinen, in Hervé, Florence and Stitz, Melanie (eds) Wir Frauen 2015. Köln: PapyRossa Verlag
- Anon. (2015), Ask Auntie D, in Koepsell, Philipp Khabo (ed.), The Afropean Contemporary: Literatur- und Gesellschaftsmagazin. Berlin: epubli GmbH. ISBN 978-3-8442-8326-6
- Byakuleka, Bino Byansi, and Otoo, Sharon Dodua (2015), The Romantics and the Criminals, in Burnley, Clementine and Otoo, Sharon Dodua (eds), Winter Shorts. Münster: Edition Assemblage, pp. 37–44
- Otoo, Sharon Dodua (2015), Whtnacig Pnait (Watching Paint), in Burnley, Clementine and Otoo, Sharon Dodua (eds), Winter Shorts. Münster: Edition Assemblage, pp. 67–78
- Otoo, Sharon Dodua (2019), Liebe, in Fatma Aydemir, Hengameh Yaghoobifarah (eds), Eure Heimat ist unser Albtraum. Berlin: Ullstein fünf. ISBN 978-3-961010-36-3

=== Online articles ===
- Otoo, Sharon Dodua (2013), Correct me if I am (politically) wrong – 'Echte' Kunst, Elitarismus und weiße Wahnvorstellungen der Erhabenheit, in: Bildpunkt. Zeitschrift der IG Bildende Kunst (Wien), No. 28, Spring, "Critical Correctness". (http://www.linksnet.de/de/artikel/28542)
- Otoo, Sharon Dodua (2013), Wer hat die Definitionsmacht? Durch die Wahl unserer Worte verändern wir die Realität, in: Critical Whiteness. Debatte um antirassistische Politik und nicht diskriminierende Sprache. Analyse & Kritik. Special edition. (https://www.akweb.de/ak_s/ak593/images/sonderbeilage_cw.pdf), pp. 24–5
- Otoo, Sharon Dodua (2014), Vom Schauen und Sehen. Schwarze Literatur und Theorieproduktion als Chance... in: an.schläge (http://www.linksnet.de/de/artikel/30425)
- Otoo, Sharon Dodua (2015), Audre Lorde. Schwarze, Lesbe, Mutter, Kriegerin, Poetin, Der Tagesspiegel (http://www.tagesspiegel.de/wissen/audre-lorde-schwarze-lesbe-mutter-kriegerin-poetin/11328810.html)
- Editor of the book series Witnessed: Sandrine Micossé-Aikins and Sharon Dodua Otoo (2012) (eds): The Little Book of Big Visions. How to Be an Artist and Revolutionize the World. Series: Witnessed, Edition 1, Münster: Edition Assemblage. ISBN 978-3-942885-31-7
- Olumide Popoola (2013), Also by Mail. Series: Witnessed, Edition 2, Münster: Edition Assemblage. ISBN 978-3-942885-38-6
- Nzitu Mawakha (2013), Daima. Images of Women of Colour in Germany. Series: Witnessed, Edition 3, Münster: Edition Assemblage. ISBN 978-3-942885-31-7
- Amy Evans (2015): The Most Unsatisfied Town. Series: Witnessed, Edition 4, Münster: Edition Assemblage. ISBN 978-3-942885-76-8
- Clementine Burnley and Sharon Dodua Otoo (2015) (eds), Winter Shorts. Series: Witnessed, Edition 5, Münster: Edition Assemblage. ISBN 978-3-942885-94-2
