= Nkechi =

Igbo-language female given name

- Pronunciation: [ˈnkeːtʃi]
- Gender: female

Origin
- Origin: Igbo
- Meaning: Chi's own; what chi has given
- Region of origin: Nigeria

Nkechi // is a feminine name of Igbo origin. It is given in its own right but can also be short for Nkechinyere. They mean "chi's own" and "what chi has given", respectively—"nke" being a demonstrative/possessive pronoun used to denote ownership and specify objects.

== People with the given name ==
- Nkechi Agwu (born 1962), Nigerian-born American teacher
- Nkechi Akashili (born 1990), Nigerian basketball player
- Nkechi Anayo-Iloputaife, Nigerian pastor and televangelist
- Nkechi Amare Diallo (born Rachel Anne Dolezal, 1977), American activist known for pretending to be black
- Nkechi Blessing Sunday (born 1989), Nigerian actor, film producer, film director, and screenwriter
- Nkechi Okoro Carroll, American writer, producer, and actor
- Nkechi Egbe (born 1978), Nigerian former football forward
- Nkechi Ikpeazu (born in the early 1960s), Nigerian politician
- Nkechi Mbilitam (born 1974), Nigerian former football midfielder
- Nkechi Justina Nwaogu (born 1956), Nigerian senator
- Nkechi Opara (born 1995), Nigerian weightlifter
