= Doležel =

Doležel (feminine: Doleželová) is a Czech surname. It has its root in the verb doležat / doležet, which meant 'to age' (about food) and 'to live to see'. The surname originated as a nickname for a lazy person. A similar surname with the same etymology is Doležal. An Anglicised and Germanised form of the surname is Dolezel.

Notable people with the surname include:

- Clint Dolezel (born 1970), American football coach
- Dieter Dolezel (born 1977), German musician
- Jana Doleželová (born 1981), Czech actress and model
- Lubomír Doležel (1922–2017), Czech literary theorist
- Milena Doleželová-Velingerová (1932–2012), Czech sinologist
- Tom Dolezel (born 1984), Canadian rugby union player
