= Doleschal =

Doleschal is a German surname, a germanised form of the Czech surname Doležal. Notable people with the surname include:

- Christian Doleschal (born 1988), German lawyer and politician
- Dominik Doleschal (born 1989), Austrian footballer

== See also ==
- Carl Ludwig Doleschall (1827–1859), Hungarian surgeon
