= Mithu Sanyal =

German cultural studies academic, writer and essayist (born 1971)

- Mithu Sanyal at the Frankfurt Book Fair 2026
- Born: Mithu Melanie Sanyal; 1971 (age 54–55); Düsseldorf, Germany
- Other name: Mithu M. Sanyal
- Education: Heinrich Heine University Düsseldorf
- Occupations: Academic, journalist, author
- Notable work: Identitti
- Children: 2

Mithu Melanie Sanyal (born 1971), also known as Mithu M. Sanyal, is a German academic in cultural studies, a journalist and author. Her main focuses are on feminism, racism, pop culture and postcolonialism.

== Life and work ==
Mithu Sanyal was born in Düsseldorf in 1971 to a Polish-born mother and an Indian father. Her mother's parents moved to Duisburg to work as miners. She studied German and English literary studies at the Heinrich-Heine-Universität Düsseldorf, where she went on to do a doctor's thesis on the cultural history of female genitalia. In 2009, she published a book called Vulva. The uncovering of the invisible sex (Vulva. Die Enthüllung des unsichtbaren Geschlechts) based on her dissertation.

Since 1996, Sanyal has been an author for radio programmes and audio books for the German public broadcaster WDR. Among others, she has also been writing for the NDR, BR, Frankfurter Rundschau, taz, junge Welt and the Federal Agency for Civic Education. Since the publishing of her second book, Rape. From Lucretia to #MeToo, Sanyal has been invited to speak publicly on panels, readings and TV shows. The books Rape and Vulva have been translated into several different languages.

Sanyal was critical of the MeToo movement, arguing that accusations of sexual assault or harassment were irreversibly stigmatizing to the accused. Feminist media in Germany condemned this statement as a trivialisation of rape and sexual violence. Right-wing blogs and websites misrepresented Sanyal's argument as a result of her Indian heritage, with some falsely claiming that rape was legal in India.

On 17 February 2017, an article by Sanyal and the journalist Marie Albrecht published in the German newspaper Die Tageszeitung sparked a controversy. After interviewing people who had experienced sexual violence, they suggested an alternative, additional term for self-identification of Opfer (victims), namely Erlebende sexualisierter Gewalt (people experiencing sexual violence). Politically Incorrect, a right-wing German blog, published Sanyal's private e-mail address, whereupon she received rape and death threats. Her article was widely discussed in mainstream media, and even the German feminist linguist Luise F. Pusch commented upon it in her blog. Hundreds of people also wrote e-mails to Sanyal showing her solidarity. In July 2019, the investigative journalism newsroom Correctiv published a statement about the incident, titled No, Mithu Sanyal did not tell victims that a rape could be an experience (Nein, Mithu Sanyal hat Opfern nicht geraten, eine Vergewaltigung könne "auch Erleben sein").

In 2021, Sanyal published her first novel, Identitti, about a professor of postcolonial theory who named herself after the Hindu goddess Saraswati and falsely claims to be of Indian descent. When she turns out to be German and to have darkened her skin, the ensuing scandal is told from the perspective of one of her students, Nivedita, who like Sanyal has a Polish mother and an Indian father. Using the pseudonym Identitti, Nivedita is the author of a blog and several social media accounts, on which she comments on topics such as racism, migration, sexual identity and orientation as well as identity politics. The character Saraswati alludes to the case of Rachel Dolezal. The novel has received mostly positive reviews.

In October 2021, Sanyal was admitted to the PEN Centre Germany. Sanyal was among the members who left when the organisation split due to the Russian invasion of Ukraine, and she was elected to be on the board of the newly founded PEN Berlin.

Sanyal's 2024 novel, Antichristie, was longlisted for the German Book Prize.

Sanyal and her husband live in Düsseldorf-Oberbilk, Germany. They have two children, a son and a daughter. She told the magazine Stern that she has had several abortions.

== Awards ==
Among other awards, Sanyal has received the Dietrich-Oppenberg-Medienpreis by the foundation Stiftung Lesen three times for her radio features about cultural history. Her novel Identitti was shortlisted for the German Book Prize in 2021. In 2026, Sanyal was awarded the Heinrich Mann Prize for essayistics. In the same year, she was awarded the 10-week London scholarship from the German Literature Fund, as Writer-in-Residence at Queen Mary University of London.

== Publications ==
Books published in English

- Rape. From Lucretia to #MeToo, Verso Books, Brooklyn (NY) / London, 2019, ISBN 978-1-78663-750-5 (German original: Vergewaltigung. Aspekte eines Verbrechens.).
- Identitti, Astra Publishing House, 2022, ISBN 978-1-6626-0130-9.

Books in German

- Vulva – die Enthüllung des unsichtbaren Geschlechts. Verlag Klaus Wagenbach, Berlin 2009, ISBN 978-3-8031-3629-9.
- co-authored by Jasna Strick, Nicole von Horst and Yasmina Banaszczuk: "Ich bin kein Sexist, aber ...". Sexismus erlebt, erklärt und wie wir ihn beenden. Orlanda Verlag, Berlin 2013, ISBN 978-3-944666-00-6.
- Vergewaltigung. Aspekte eines Verbrechens. Edition Nautilus, Hamburg 2016, ISBN 978-3-96054-023-6.
- Identitti. Novel. Carl Hanser Verlag, Munich 2021, ISBN 978-3-446-26921-7.
- Über Emily Brontë. Kiepenheuer & Witsch, Cologne 2022, ISBN 978-3-462-00366-6.
- Antichristie. Novel. Carl Hanser, Munich 2024, ISBN 978-3-446-28076-2
- NEIN. Gegen die Militarisierung der Gegenwart. Carl Hanser, Munich 2026, ISBN 978-3-446-29017-4.

Audio books

- Sternenkinder sterben schöner, later called Aliens sind auch nur Menschen, Director: Leonhard Koppelmann (WDR 2009)
- LoveArtLab Rules, Director: Ulrich Bassenge (WDR 2010)
- Post Porn Panik, Director: Leonhard Koppelmann (WDR 2012)
- Gott ist tot. Wirklich. Director: Martin Zylka, 55 Min. (WDR 2015)
- Identitti. Director: Eva Solloch, 52 Min. (WDR 2022)

Articles in newspapers, journals and anthologies

- Zuhause. In: Fatma Aydemir, Hengameh Yaghoobifarah (Hrsg.): Eure Heimat ist unser Albtraum. Ullstein fünf, Berlin 2019, ISBN 978-3-96101-036-3.
- From 2017 to 2019, Sanyal wrote the column Kolumne „Mithulogie" in Die Tageszeitung (taz)
- In 2019/2020/2025, she wrote for The Guardian.

== See also ==
- Fatma Aydemir
- Hengameh Yaghoobifarah
- Margarete Stokowski
