= Simone Dede Ayivi =

German director and performer

- Born: 1982 (age 43–44); Hanau, Hesse, Germany
- Education: University of Hidesheim
- Known for: Director, Performer, Dramaturg

Simone Dede Ayivi (born 1982) is a German director, performer, and dramaturg who lives in Berlin, Germany. Her works play with established ways of seeing by breaking down and placing stereotypes into new contexts. Her work is typically read in relation to her own Afro-German biography and through the lenses of decolonization and afro-feminism.

== Life and education ==
Simone Dede Ayivi was born in 1982 in Hanau am Main, Germany. She studied Cultural Studies and aesthetic practice at the University of Hildesheim. During her time at the university, she also produced numerous theatrical productions and was a member of the management team at the Theaterhaus Hildesheim.

While Simone Dede Ayivi is most known for her theater productions, she has is also a published writer, having written essays for various publications including taz and a contribution to the anthology collection Eure Heimat ist unser Albtraum (2019) titled "Zusammen" which was translated to English and published in the US in 2020 as "Together."

== Major works ==
Her major works include Queens (2018), First Black Woman in Space (2016), Now I'm Here, Performing Black (2015), Black Hair Politics, We Play., and War of the Squirrels.
