= Identitti =

2021 novel by Mithu Sanyal

- Author: Mithu Sanyal
- Translator: Alta L. Price
- Language: German
- Publisher: Carl Hanser Verlag
- Publication date: 15 February 2021
- ISBN: 9-783-446-26921-7

Identitti is a 2021 German novel by Mithu Sanyal and originally published by Carl Hanser Verlag. It was translated into English in 2022 by Alta L. Price. A theatrical adaption premiered on 12 November 2021 at the Düsseldorfer Schauspielhaus.

== Plot ==
Nivedita Anand is a German woman of colour from Düsseldorf, with a German mother of Polish descent and an Indian father. Nivedita blogs under the name Identitti about social justice and racism issues. Nivedita is a postcolonial studies major at Heinrich Heine University Düsseldorf, and is an ardent follower of the charismatic Indian professor Saraswati. After Nivedita's cousin Priti sleeps with Saraswati's brother Konstantin, Priti inadvertently stumbles upon evidence that Saraswati is actually a White woman named Sarah Vera Thielmann and Nivedita comes under fire from other social justice activists for her prior support of Saraswati.

== Reception ==
A review from the Frankfurter Allgemeine Zeitung stated that Sanyal had "an unheard-of talent for showing both the freedom of extreme thinking and the limits of discourse" and that the novel was "a very unique genre [..]: a mixture of campus novel, intellectual chamber play, blogosphere plateau and identity politics satire."

The Süddeutsche Zeitung considers that "know-it-all, dominant characters" like Saraswati "trigger aversions, no matter what skin color they have" and that the reason for this could be"a demonstration of strength – because as an author of color, [...] she can do it," but concludes that it is more likely that she wants to guide the reader through a mental exercise in order to lead the reader to the conclusion that progressives should stand united against hatred.

The New York Times called the novel "bracing" and praised Sanyal's boldness and nuanced writing.

Deutschlandfunk Kultur said that the novel was "daring and bright" and claimed that Sanyal deftly explores the issue of transracial identities in a society where gender is fluid and what this means for the cause of anti-racism.

It was shortlisted for the 2021 German Book Prize.
