= Barbara J. Fields =

American historian (born 1947)

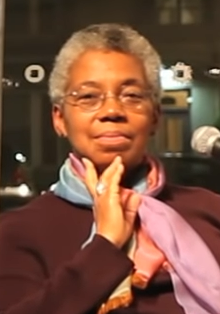
- Fields in 2013
- Born: Barbara Jeanne Fields; 1947 (age 78–79)
- Awards: John H. Dunning Prize (1986); Lincoln Prize (1994)

Academic background
- Education: Harvard University (BA); Yale University (PhD)

Academic work
- Institutions: Columbia University; Northwestern University; University of Michigan; University of Mississippi

Barbara Jeanne Fields (born 1947) is an American historian. She is a professor of history at Columbia University. Her focus is on history of the Southern United States and 19th century social history.

== Life and education ==
Barbara Fields was born in Charleston, South Carolina, in 1947, and was raised in Washington, D.C., where she attended Morgan Elementary School, Banneker Junior High School, and Western High School. She received her B.A. from Harvard University in 1968, and her Ph.D. from Yale University in 1978. At Yale, she was a doctoral student of historian C. Vann Woodward.

== Career ==
Fields was the first African-American woman to earn academic tenure at Columbia University. She has also taught at Northwestern University, the University of Michigan, and the University of Mississippi.

She is widely known for her 1990 essay, "Slavery, Race and Ideology in the United States of America".

She co-authored the 2012 book Racecraft: The Soul of Inequality in American Life with her sister Karen Fields, a sociologist. The book argues that race is a product of racism, that racism is an ideology and a way of misunderstanding social reality, and that racecraft in American society serves to obfuscate the actual dynamics of inequality.

Fields appears in Ken Burns' documentary series The Civil War and The Congress.

Fields was critical of The New York Times' 1619 Project for ignoring indentured servitude in Virginia in 1607 and failing to understand the economics behind slavery.

Bard College awarded Fields an honorary doctorate in May 2007. Thavolia Glymph named Fields as one of the nation's greatest historians.

== Awards ==
- 1992 MacArthur Fellowship
- 1986 John H. Dunning Prize for Slavery and Freedom on the Middle Ground
- Confederate Memorial Literary Society Founders Prize for The Destruction of Slavery
- Society for History in the Federal Government's Thomas Jefferson Prize for The Destruction of Slavery
- 1994 Lincoln Prize for Free At Last (as co-editor)
- Philolexian Society award for Distinguished Literary Achievement in 2017

== Works ==
=== Journal Articles ===
- "Slavery, Race and Ideology in the United States of America", New Left Review, No. 181, May/June 1990
- "Whiteness, Racism and Identity", International Labor & Working-Class History, No. 60, Fall 2001
- "Origins of the New South and the Negro Question", Journal of Southern History, Vol. 67 No. 4, November 2001
- "Of Rogues and Geldings", American Historical Review, Vol. 180 No. 5, December 2003

=== Books ===
- Slavery and Freedom on the Middle Ground: Maryland during the Nineteenth Century (Yale University Press, 1985), ISBN 0-300-04032-6
- The Destruction of Slavery: A Documentary History of Emancipation, 1861–1867 (Cambridge University Press, 1985), eds. Ira Berlin, Barbara J. Fields, Thavolia Glymph, Joseph P. Reidy, Leslie S. Rowland, ISBN 978-0-521-13214-5
- Slaves No More: Three Essays on the Emancipation and the Civil War (Cambridge University Press, 1992) ISBN 978-0-521-43102-6
- Free At Last: A Documentary History of Slavery, Emancipation, and the Civil War (The New Press, 1992) ISBN 978-1-56584-015-7
- Racecraft: The Soul of Inequality in American Life (Verso, 2012), with Karen Fields, ISBN 978-1844679942
