= Drahanovice =

- Municipality
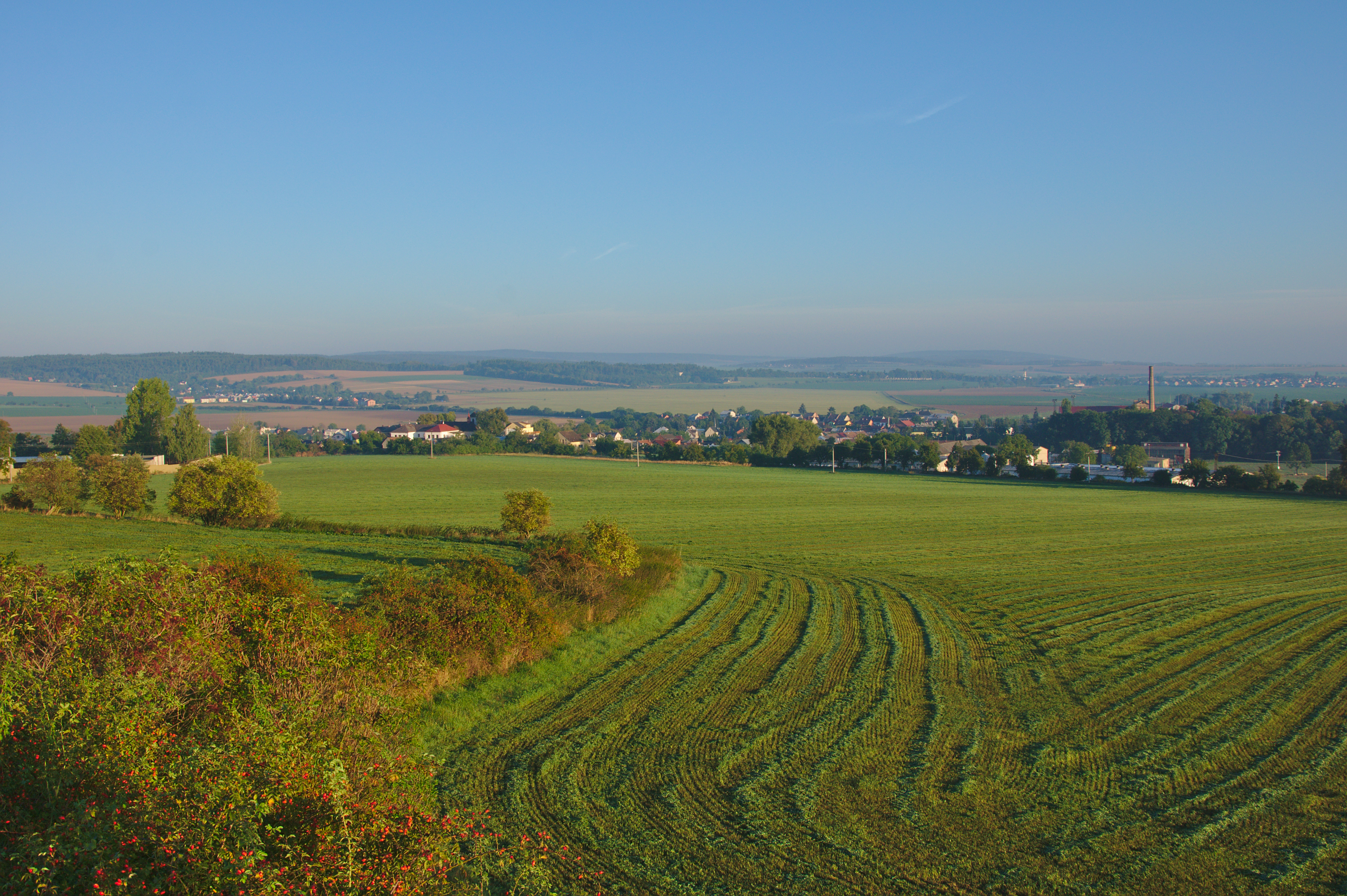
- View from the south

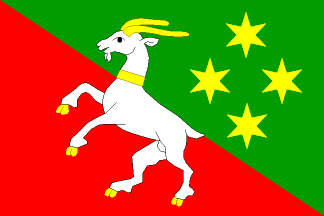
- Flag Coat of arms

- Location in the Czech Republic
- Coordinates: 49°34′43″N 17°4′37″E
- Country: Czech Republic
- Region: Olomouc
- District: Olomouc
- First mentioned: 1287

Area
  - Total: 13.53 km^{2} (5.22 sq mi)
- Elevation: 339 m (1,112 ft)

Population (2026-01-01)
  - Total: 1,811
  - Density: 133.9/km^{2} (346.7/sq mi)
- Time zone: UTC+1 (CET)
  - Summer (DST): UTC+2 (CEST)
- Postal code: 783 44
- Website: www.obecdrahanovice.cz

Drahanovice (German: Drahanowitz) is a municipality and village in Olomouc District in the Olomouc Region of the Czech Republic. It has about 1,800 inhabitants.

Drahanovice lies approximately 13 kilometres (8 mi) west of Olomouc and 199 km (124 mi) east of Prague.

== Administrative division ==
Drahanovice consists of five municipal parts (in brackets population according to the 2021 census):

- Drahanovice (967)
- Kníničky (41)
- Lhota pod Kosířem (117)
- Ludéřov (348)
- Střížov (258)

== Demographics ==
Historical population
Year	Pop.	±%
1869	1,460	—
1880	1,669	+14.3%
1890	1,782	+6.8%
1900	1,902	+6.7%
1910	1,985	+4.4%
1921	1,988	+0.2%
1930	2,234	+12.4%
1950	1,901	−14.9%
1961	2,009	+5.7%
1970	1,952	−2.8%
1980	1,743	−10.7%
1991	1,604	−8.0%
2001	1,700	+6.0%
2011	1,628	−4.2%
2021	1,731	+6.3%
Source: Censuses
