= Kartoffel =

Derogatory German slang term

Kartoffel (German for potato, German: [kaʁˈtɔfl̩]) is a derogatory slang term used by other cultures to describe Germans. It is also used in a humorous way and as a self-denomination. In English, kartoffel can also be used literally, or for literary effect, to mean potato.

== History ==
"Kartoffel" refers to a person of German descent, particularly an ethnic German from the perspective of allochthone populations in Germany. Use of the word Kartoffelfresser ("potato glutton") was popularised in the 1960s, when it was commonly used as a derogatory term to describe people of German descent. The first known use of the word in a similar sense was in 1873, when the Grimms' Deutsches Wörterbuch used it in a teasing manner to describe inhabitants of the Ore Mountains as Kartoffelwänste ("potato tummies"), because potatoes were the only substance that they ate, whether out of poverty, habit, or both.

== Controversies ==
The term "Kartoffel" has been used in debates about Germanophobia. In 2010, Kristina Schröder, the Minister for Family Affairs, stated in a television interview for the ARD that children were being described as "German potatoes" or "German sluts". She described such insults as a form of racism. Ehrhart Körting, the Berlin Senator of the Interior and Cem Özdemir, co-chair of the Alliance 90/The Greens party called for consistent action against such behavior, whilst the Alliance 90/The Greens politician Sven-Christian Kindler described Schröder's statements as "pseudo-scientific, dangerous nonsense".

German journalist Julian Reichelt was nominated for the Goldene Kartoffel ("golden potato") award in 2018 by the Neue deutsche Medienmacher ("New German Media Makers") association, for Bild-Zeitung on writing reports on the poor and immigration. Reichelt rejected the award, claiming that the term "Kartoffel" had evolved into a "racial insult on German school yards and is by no means well intentioned."

"Kartoffel" later appeared in public debate concerning Germany's national football team after they were knocked out of the 2018 FIFA World Cup in Russia. According to an article published in the German magazine Der Spiegel, the German football team was said to be segregated into self-appointed groups. Kanake (derogatory slang for "foreigner") including international players Jérôme Boateng and Mesut Özil and Kartoffel, with "typical" Germans like Thomas Müller and Mats Hummels. The difference between these groups is mainly associated with the players' lives: the more lavishly living Kanake group made fun of the lives of the Kartoffeln. In response to news coverage of this, national players İlkay Gündoğan and Lukas Podolski, active players in the German Football Association (DFB) until 2017, said that it was harmless teasing.

German satirist and late-night show host Jan Böhmermann described the authors of German Wikipedia as mainly white Germans with no immigration background in the episode Die Telelupe: Wikipedia on Neo Magazin Royale on April 18, 2019. He created the article Kartoffel (Slang) on German Wikipedia to see whether the material, which would offend this group of people, would remain on Wikipedia.

== Literal and literary usage ==
In English, kartoffel can be used to mean potato, literally, or for literary effect, as in the stylized argot, Nadsat, of the novel A Clockwork Orange by Anthony Burgess, for example, 'Then, my brothers, we had these off-white cravats which looked like whipped-up kartoffel or spud with a sort of a design made on it with a fork.' and, 'It was really a very nice appetizing bit of pishcha they'd laid out on the tray - two or three lomticks of like hot roastbeef with mashed kartoffel and vedge, then there was also ice-cream and a nice hot chasha of chai.'

== See also ==
- Kraut, a derogatory term for Germans in English during the World Wars
- List of terms used for Germans
- List of ethnic slurs by ethnicity
- List of regional nicknames
