= Karen Fields =

American sociologist

Karen E. Fields is an American sociologist. She is the sister of historian Barbara J. Fields.

She has degrees from Harvard University, Brandeis University, and the Sorbonne.

== Books ==
- Revival and Rebellion in Colonial Central Africa
- Lemon Swamp and Other Places: A Carolina Memoir (with Mamie Garvin Fields)
- The Elementary Forms of Religious Life (Translation)
- Racecraft: The Soul of Inequality in American Life (2012)
