= Rudolf Doležal =

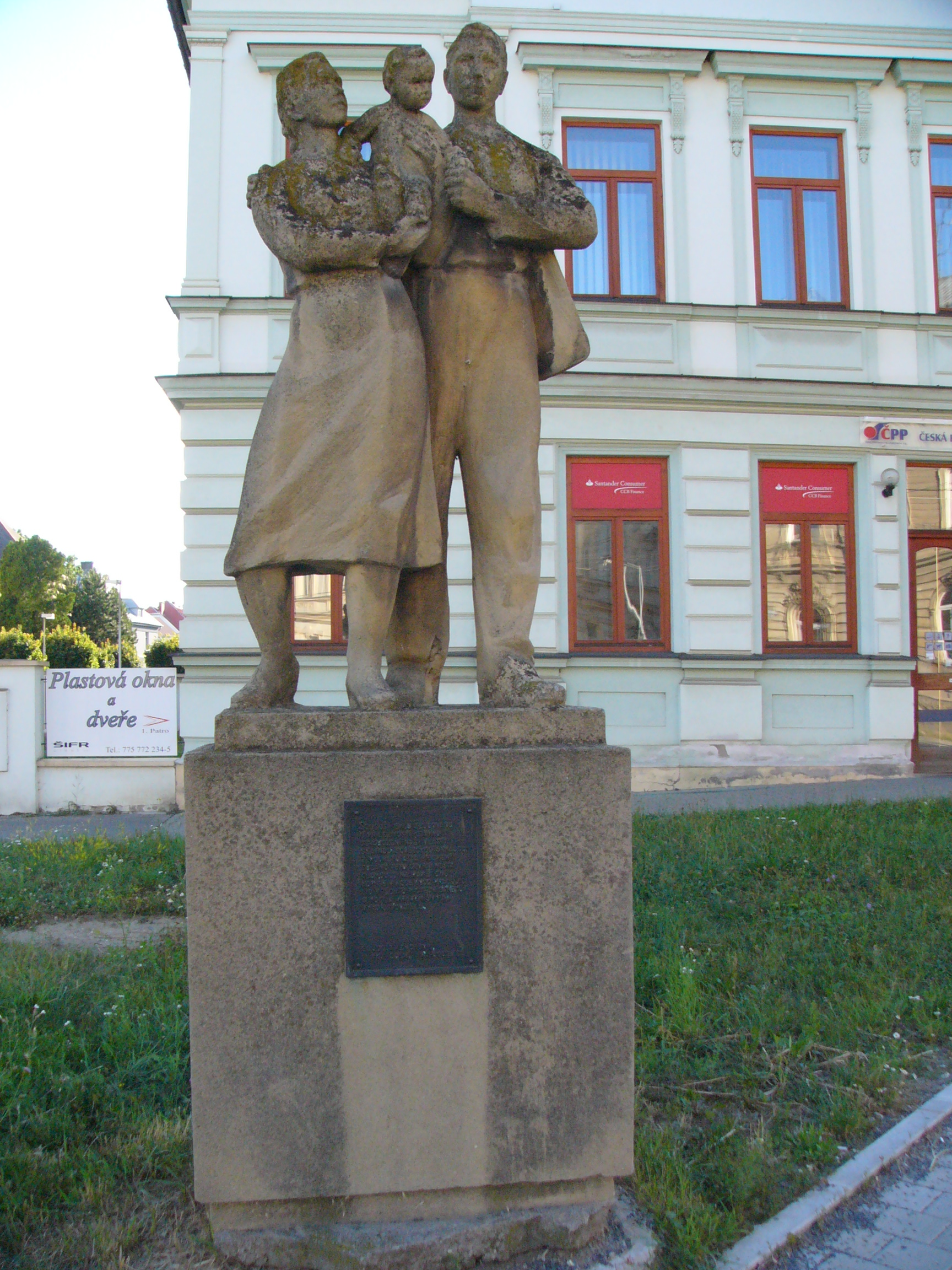
Statue Workers Family by Doležal

Rudolf Doležal (19 July 1916 in Horka nad Moravou, – 2002 in Olomouc) was a Czechoslovak sculptor and medallist, author of many sculptures in Moravian towns and villages.

== Works ==
- 1947: Pěvci Slezských písní (Statue of Petr Bezruč), Olomouc - Bezruč Park - with Vojtěch Hořínek a Karel Lenhart
- 1950: Výhybkář, Olomouc - Svoboda Avenue
- 1951 - 1955: Statue of Lenin and Stalin, Olomouc - with Vojtěch Hořínek, removed in 1990
- 1958: Muses, Summer cinema in Olomouc
- 1959: Frývaldov Strike (statue), Dolní Lipová
- 1960: Workers Family, Olomouc-New Street - Litovel Street
- 1961: Boy with Pigeon, elementary school in Horka nad Moravou
- 1966: Welder, Přerov
- 1967: Children, Lipník nad Bečvou
- 1970s: Statue Ječný klas ("ear of barley") in I. P. Pavlova Street, Olomouc
- 1972: Readers, Vsetín - elementary school
- 1974: Airman, Olomouc - Peace Avenue
- 1976: Novitas Olomucensis - the main road of the flowers fair Flora Olomouc
- 1977: Spring Song, Vsetín - housing estate Trávníky
- 1979: Klement Gottwald Statue, Olomouc, removed in 1990

== Gallery ==
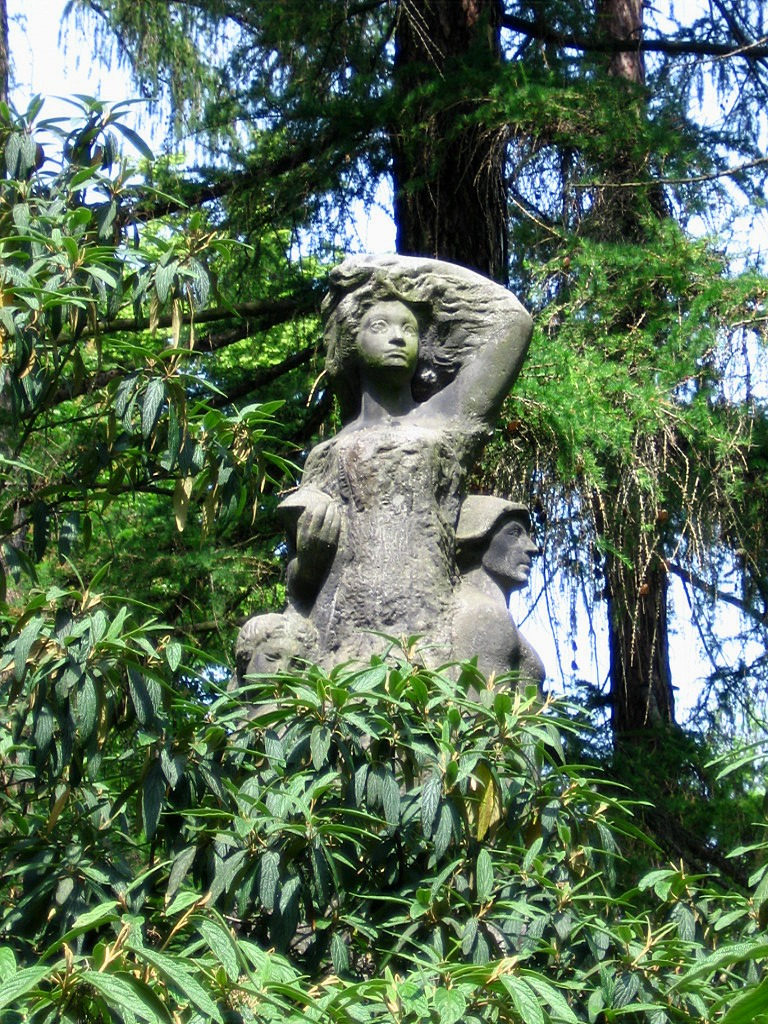
Rudolf Doležal, Vojtěch Hořínek, Karel Lenhart: Statue of singers of Silesian songs in Bezruč Park in Olomouc

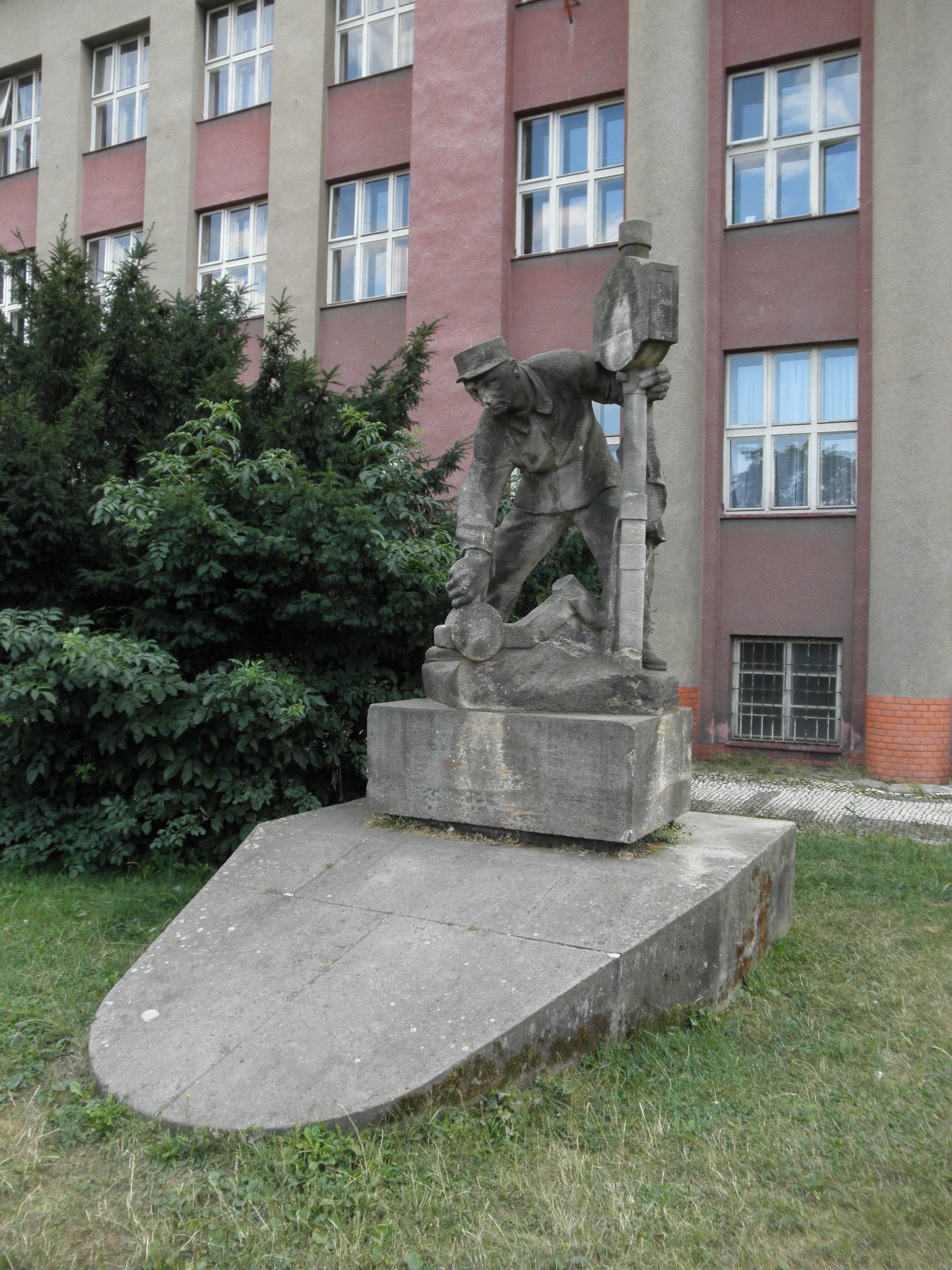
Rudolf Doležal: Výhybkář (Switchman)

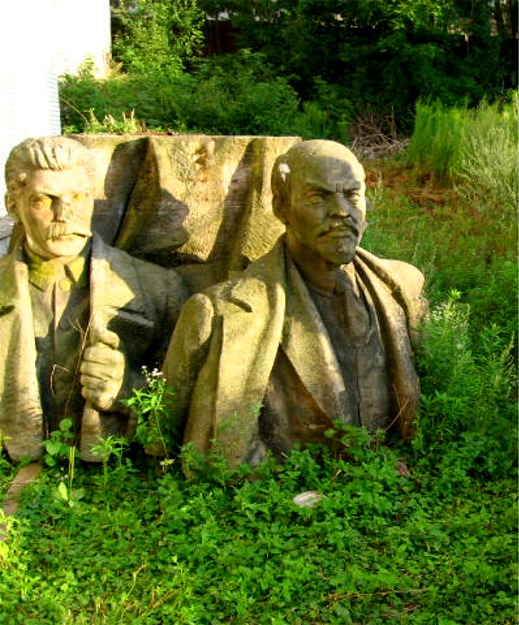
Rudolf Doležal, Vojtěch Hořínek: Statue of Lenin and Stalin in Olomouc (fragment)

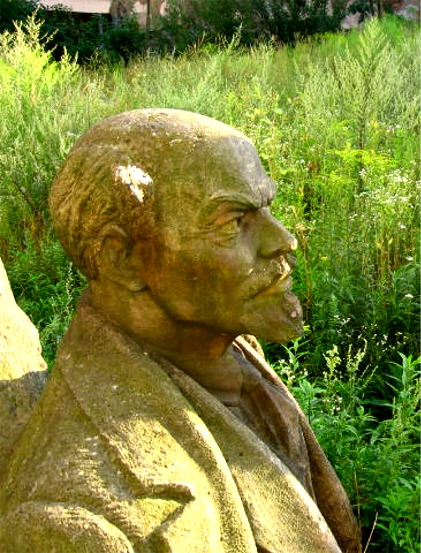
Rudolf Doležal, Vojtěch Hořínek: Statue of Lenin and Stalin in Olomouc (fragment)

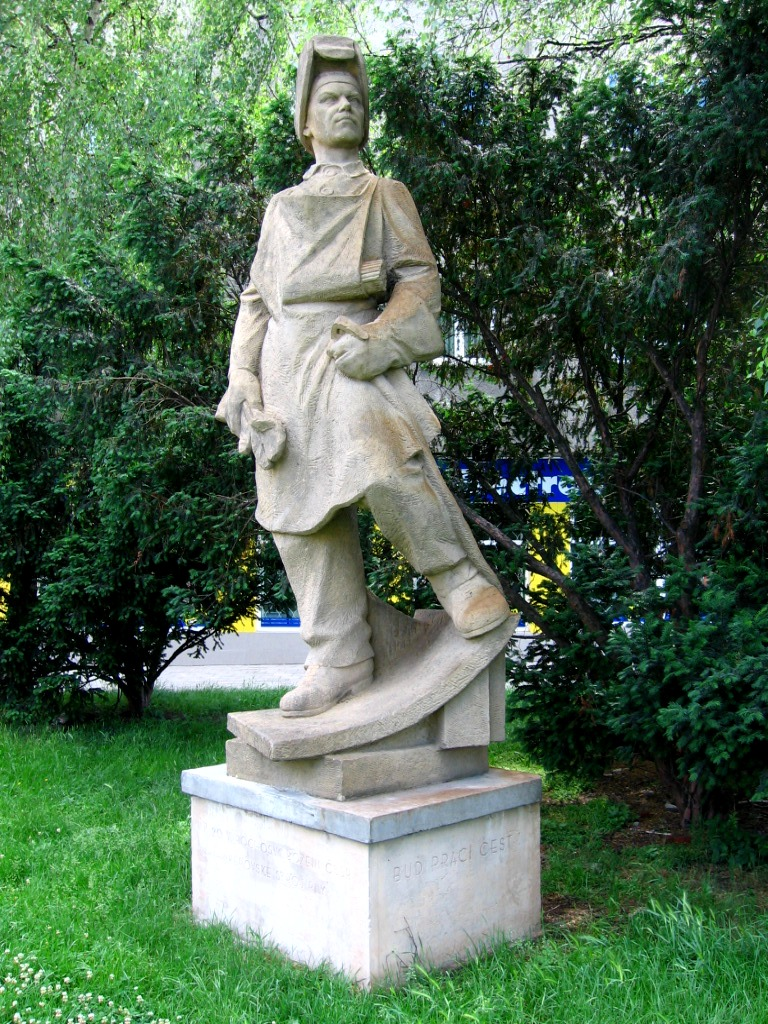
Rudolf Doležal: Welder, statue commemorating 20th anniversary of liberation of the Czechoslovak Socialist Republic in Přerov (stonemason František Koutek)

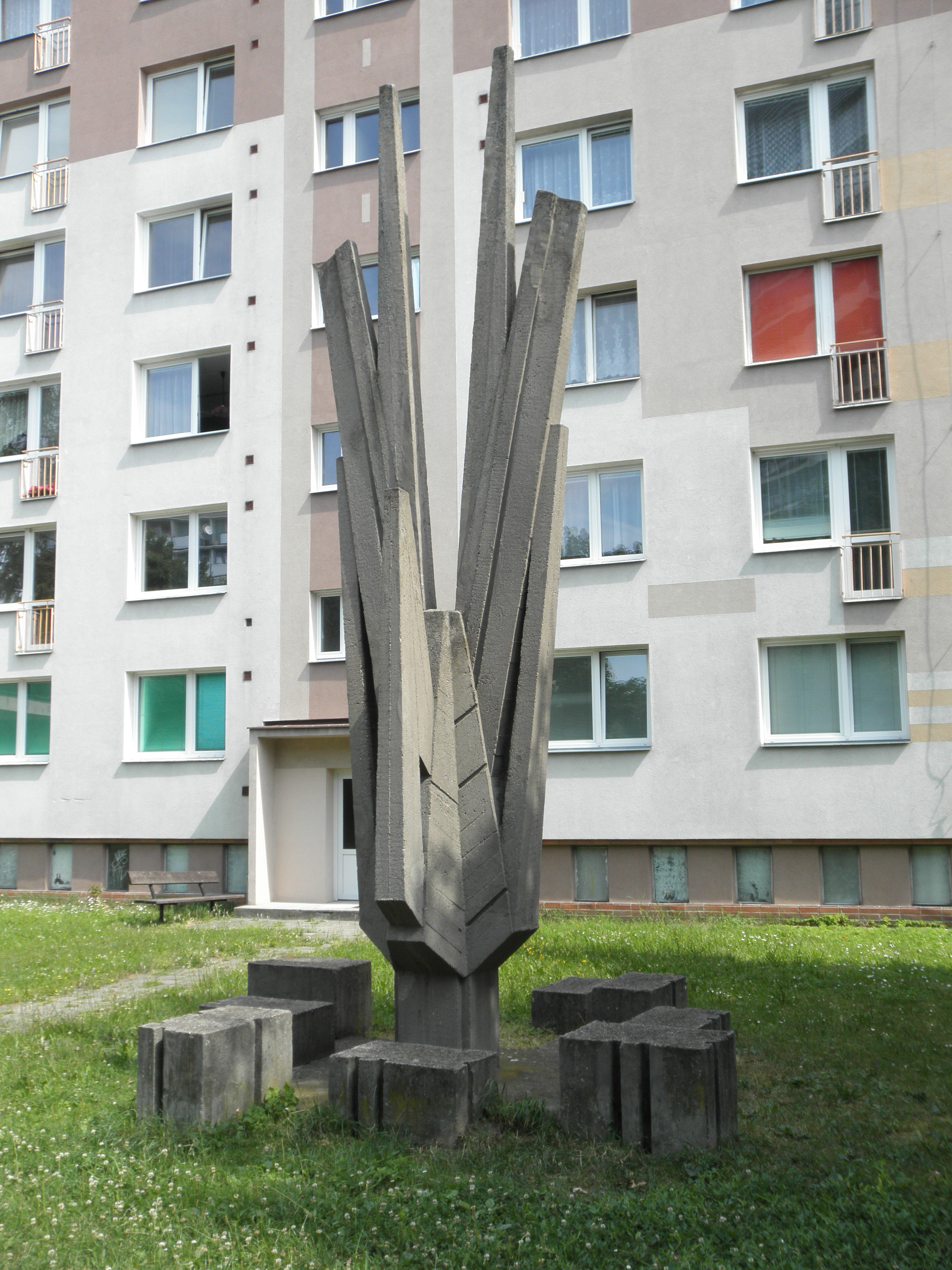
Statue Ječný klas ("ear of barley")
