= Joshua Dolezal =

American academic and writer

- Born: Joshua Andrew Dolezal; September 1975 (age 51)
- Occupations: Academic, writer

Academic background
- Education: King University (BA); University of Nebraska–Lincoln (MA, PhD)

Academic work
- Discipline: English studies
- Institutions: Central College

Joshua Andrew Dolezal (/ˈdoʊləʒɑːl/; also spelled Doležal; born September 1975) is an American academic and writer. He was a full professor of English studies at Central College, focusing on American literature, creative nonfiction, medical humanities, sustainability and social justice issues. He is the brother of Rachel Dolezal and wrote a book about their upbringing in "a strict, cult-like Pentecostal family."

== Career ==
Dolezal received a B.A. in English from King College in 1997, an M.A. in American literature from the University of Nebraska–Lincoln in 1999 and a Ph.D. in American literature at the University of Nebraska–Lincoln in 2005. He joined Central College as an assistant professor of English in 2005, was later promoted to associate professor, and was promoted to full professor in 2016. In 2022 he left this job as part of the "Big Quit".

== Work ==
Dolezal is the author of a number of essays, poems, and academic papers e.g. on literary and social justice activism.

He is also the author of a 2014 memoir, Down from the Mountaintop: From Belief to Belonging, which details his upbringing in "a strict, cult-like Christian family" and which received widespread attention in connection with the 2015 controversy surrounding his sister, Rachel Dolezal. The book was described by Kim Barnes as an "intimate and lyrical story of fallen faith, found love, and the way we must sometimes circle back to find what we have lost."

== Rachel Dolezal controversy ==
Joshua Dolezal received media attention in connection with the controversy surrounding his sister Rachel Dolezal in 2015, including for his earlier book about the siblings' childhood.

The Rachel Dolezal case started when Rachel Dolezal reported numerous "hate crimes" against her that a police investigation failed to substantiate. Rachel Dolezal also accused Joshua of sexual abuse and her parents of violence, which the Dolezal family disputed. An allegation against Joshua Dolezal over alleged sexual abuse 13–14 years earlier was dismissed in 2015. The allegations were discussed in the 2018 Netflix documentary The Rachel Divide. Their brother Ezra Dolezal said "Rachel is not always honest." In the film, Rachel said that Joshua had hired a private investigator to look into Rachel, and it was this investigator who revealed Rachel's racial identity to the local media in Spokane, a claim that KXLY-TV reporter Jeff Humphrey, who first questioned Dolezal on her racial identity in June 2015, corroborated. They suggested that this was an attempt to weaken Rachel's credibility in her claims of sexual abuse against Joshua Dolezal. The charges were subsequently dropped. In a written response to Rachel Dolezal's allegations, Joshua Dolezal said that "the lies my sister tells about me and my family are obscene. But they should be understood as part of a con game she is still playing. Masquerading as Black helped her gain celebrity until that deception was exposed. Celebrity is still her goal, not social justice."

== Selected bibliography ==
- Down from the Mountaintop: From Belief to Belonging, memoir, University of Iowa Press, 2014
