= Tomáš Doležal =

Czech ice hockey player

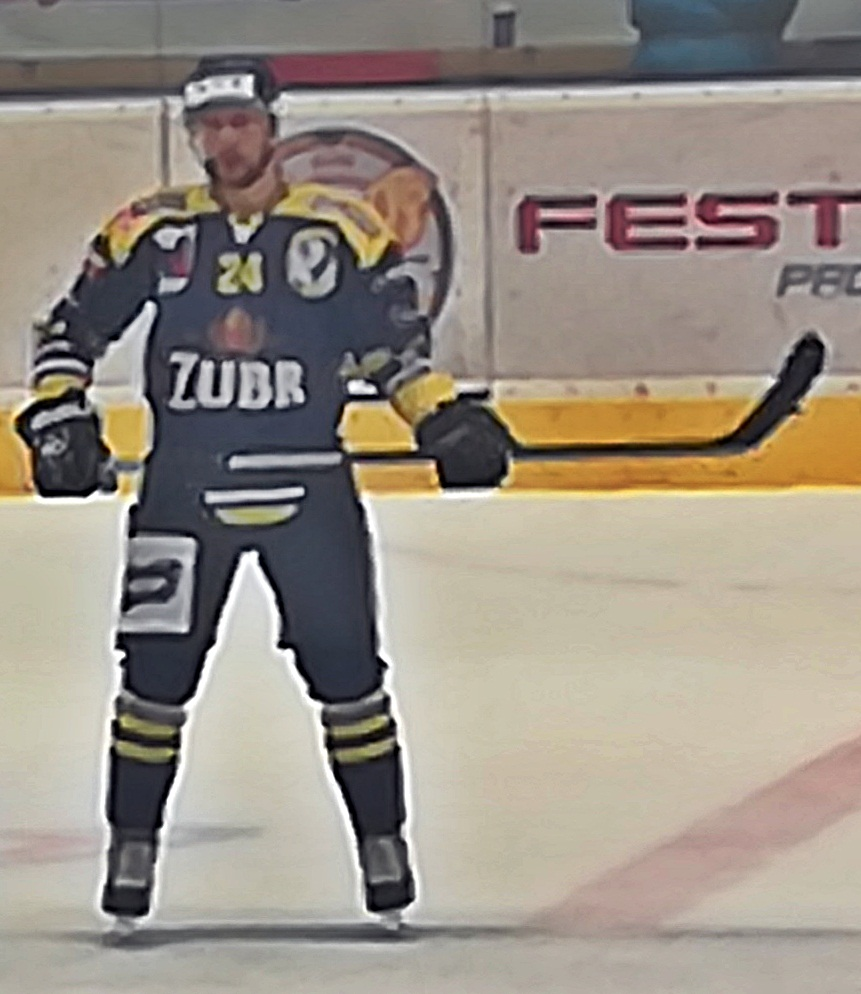
- Tomáš Doležal in 2017
- Born: September 29, 1990 (age 35) Jyväskylä, Finland
- Height: 5 ft 10 in (178 cm)
- Weight: 172 lb (78 kg; 12 st 4 lb)
- Position: Centre
- Shoots: Left
- Chance Liga team Former teams: HC ZUBR Přerov; HC Slavia Praha; HC Litvínov
- Playing career: 2011–present

Tomáš Doležal (born September 29, 1990) is a Czech professional ice hockey centre. He is currently playing for HC ZUBR Přerov of the Chance Liga.

Doležal previously played with HC Slavia Praha and HC Litvínov in the Czech Extraliga.

He was born in Finland while his father Jiří was playing hockey for JYP. His elder brother Jiří Jr was also a professional (both played for Slavia Praha).
