= Racecraft =

2012 book by Karen and Barbara J. Fields

Racecraft: The Soul of Inequality in American Life
- Cover art for the first edition
- Author: Karen Fields; Barbara J. Fields
- Language: English
- Publication place: United States
- ISBN: 978-1-84467-995-9

Racecraft: The Soul of Inequality in American Life is a 2012 anthology book co-authored by sociologist Karen Fields and her sister, historian Barbara J. Fields. The book examines the origins and production of race and racism in the United States. Published by Verso Books, Racecraft is organized as a collection of three original essays and six republished essays examining race. The book draws an analogy between race and witchcraft, arguing that both concepts function as mystical, yet seemingly rational explanations for real events.

== Background ==
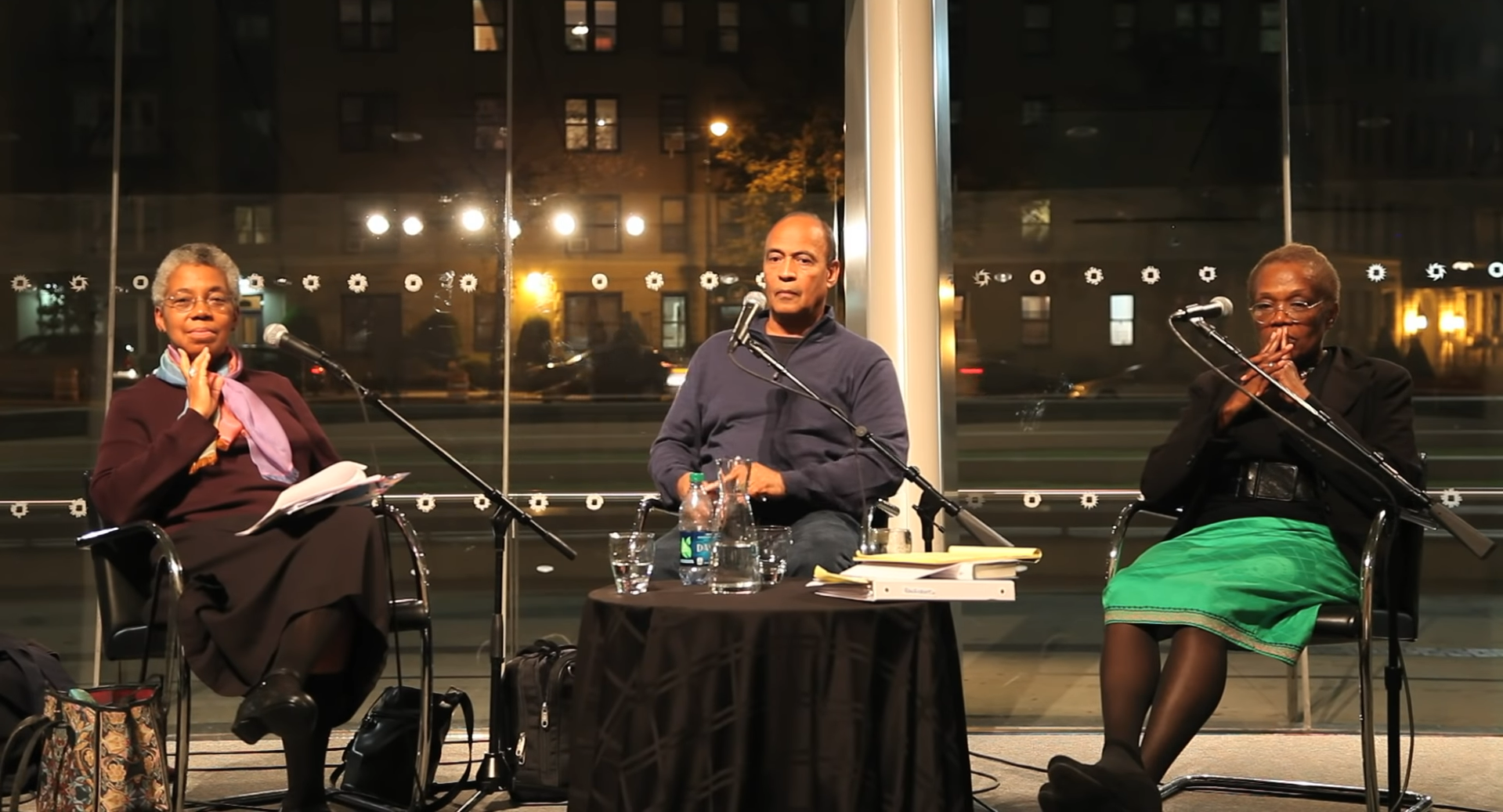
Karen and Barbara Fields discussing Racecraft with Adolph Reed at the Brooklyn Museum in 2012

Racecraft, the book's governing concept and title, analogizes race with the beliefs of witchcraft, where racecraft describes a set of social practices that misconstrue racism for race. The book warns against "turn[ing] racism into race", such as in the statement "black Southerners were segregated because of their skin color" which disguises the social practice of racism as inborn individual traits. The Fields sisters argue that race is a social construct and solely the product of racism, that racism is an ideology that misunderstands social reality by treating race as an independent social force, and that racecraft obfuscates the dynamics of racism in the United States.

== Summary ==
The book's introduction, first two chapters, and conclusion had not previously been published, while the book's third through eighth chapters were republished with minor changes. The book's first chapter, "A Tour of Racecraft", examines the concept of racecraft by presenting various everyday practices where racecraft, the belief in racial difference, is reinforced. The chapter also criticizes efforts to populate multiracial identity which the book dismisses as "recycled racist fiction" that relies upon false assumptions of a pure racial ancestry.

In "Of Rogues and Geldings", the book's third chapter, Barbara Fields criticizes the use of race as a neutral descriptor of American history. In the chapter Barbara Fields argues that the use of race as an explanatory variable remains incompatible with the social construction theory of race and only serves to strengthen the structural foundation of race.

The book's fourth chapter, "Slavery, Race, and Ideology in the United States of America", originally published in 1990, forms the historical foundation for the critique outlined in Racecraft. In the essay, Barbara Fields argues that the transition from largely English indentured servants to African slaves as the dominant mode of labor in the American colonies was the result of historical and economic differences, rather than racial differences. Fields argues that the first enslaved Africans in the colonies were not yet considered a race, and that the ideology of race was only invented later as a set of explanations resolving the contradiction between the enslavement of some and the liberty of others. In defining race as an ideology created to justify racism, the book inverts the typical causal ordering that defines racism as discrimination or prejudice based on race.

In the book's fifth chapter, "Origins of the New South and the Negro Question", Barbara Fields extends the critique of the fourth chapter to the discourse of "race relations" and conceptions of race as identity, which Fields dismisses as "only biological race in polite language". The chapter argues that slavery was primarily a system of labor management, rather than one concerned with "race relations". The book's sixth chapter, "What One Cannot Remember Mistakenly", diverges from the other chapters to recount Karen Fields's oral history work with her grandmother.

In the book's seventh chapter, "Witchcraft and Racecraft: Invisible Ontology in Its Sensible Manifestations", Karen Fields compares witchcraft to racecraft, arguing that both patterns of thought provide rationalizations that account for cause and consequence. Paralleling the omnipresence of witchcraft, the chapter presents examples of fallacious logic and daily rituals that reproduce race in the United States. Fields argues that such rationalizations constitute an "invisible ontology", a concept borrowed from the philosopher Kwame Anthony Appiah, where in the same way a string of bad luck was interpreted as the result of curses, the effects of racism are attributed to race.

The book's eighth chapter, written by Karen Fields, consists of an imagined conversation between Émile Durkheim and W. E. B. Du Bois.

== Reception ==
=== Content ===
Reviewers writing in the Journal of American Studies, the Marx & Philosophy Review of Books, and the Sociology of Race and Ethnicity praised the book for challenging central sociological assumptions about race and inequality. In particular, reviewers praised the concepts and historical analysis presented in the fourth and seventh chapters of the book. Anthony Hutchison, in the Journal of American Studies, praised the concept of racecraft as "undoubtedly indispensable", comparing it to Marx's theory of commodity fetishism. Zine Magubane, writing in the Sociology of Race and Ethnicity, praised the book as one of the greatest contributions to sociology ever published. Magubane felt that the book's fourth chapter was especially enlightening by challenging the view that "race could and should be viewed as both 'a coherent analytical category and a valid empirical datum'". PopMatters praised the two chapters as particularly accessible and convincing.

Cultural critic Thomas Chatterton Williams wrote that Racecraft, along with Albert Murray's The Omni-Americans were the only two books successful in entirely transforming the way he thought about race. Author Zadie Smith stated that the book "fundamentally challenged some of my oldest and laziest ideas about race". Maria Bustillos, writing in the Los Angeles Review of Books, praised the book as accurate to her lived experience.

American historian and professor of African American studies Walter Johnson praised the book as an incisive and "resolutely materialist" analysis, but criticized it for its limited scope and approach to political mobilization in its conclusion. Both Guy Lancaster of the Marx & Philosophy Review of Books and Hutchison felt that certain parts of the book seemed only tangentially related to the book's subject matter.

=== Prose ===
Juli Grigsby, writing for The Journal of American History, the Marx & Philosophy Review of Books, and the Los Angeles Review of Books all praised the book's narrative style for its accessibility. In contrast, Johnson criticized the book's prose as too dry and scholarly. Author Ta-Nehisi Coates stated that he sometimes had difficulty following the book, stating that he needed time to process the book's thesis.

=== Audiobook ===
An audio edition of the book narrated by Robin Eller was released in 2017. Publishers Weekly critiqued Eller for sometimes creating a staccato delivery, but otherwise praised Eller's narration as "clear and emphatic".
