= The Rachel Divide =

2018 documentary film by Laura Brownson

- Promotional poster
- Directed by: Laura Brownson
- Written by: Laura Brownson; Jeff Seymann Gilbert
- Produced by: Laura Brownson; Khaliah Neal; Bridget Stokes; Tessa Treadway; Roger Ross Williams
- Edited by: Jeff Seymann Gilbert
- Distributed by: Netflix
- Release dates: April 23, 2018 (Tribeca Film Festival); April 27, 2018 (United States)
- Running time: 100 minutes
- Country: United States
- Language: English

The Rachel Divide is a 2018 documentary about the controversial life of Rachel Dolezal, also known as Nkechi Diallo, an American woman of white parentage who identifies as black, and was forced to resign as president of the NAACP chapter in Spokane, Washington when her race and ancestry were exposed. The film was directed by Laura Brownson and distributed by Netflix, originally airing on April 27, 2018.

== Background ==
Dolezal's troubles in her professional life began when journalists in the Spokane, Washington area received tips from her brother, Joshua Dolezal, that she was hiding a secret. As her background was further investigated, her secret was revealed: Dolezal was born white, with blonde hair and blue eyes, not black as she claimed. President of the National Association for the Advancement of Colored People (NAACP) chapter in Spokane, Washington from February 7, 2014 until June 15, 2015 when she resigned, Dolezal left amid suspicion she had lied about hate crimes that had been committed against her. Following these reports, Dolezal's parents, Ruthanne and Larry Dolezal, publicly stated that their daughter Dolezal was not black but a white woman passing for black. Consequently, Dolezal was dismissed from her position as an instructor in Africana studies at Eastern Washington University and removed by the Spokane city council as chair of the police ombudsman commission over "a pattern of misconduct." A subsequent police investigation did not support Dolezal's hate crime allegations.

== Plot ==
The documentary explores what led up to Dolezal's fall from being a respected university instructor and activist, the circumstances surrounding it, and the aftermath of the scandal.

The film states that Joshua Dolezal was accused by his sister and another of the Dolezal siblings of sexual abuse when they were younger. The film further delves into Dolezal's upbringing by parents whom she claims were psychologically abusive and whom her sister Esther says were physically abusive. Esther is shown on camera as having a scar on her thigh that she says is the result of a beating from her parents with a glue gun stick. Esther also says while visiting South Africa they beat her with a baboon whip. Rachel Dolezal claims in on-camera interviews that her parents neglected to educate their adopted children about their racial heritage and this is what led her to researching black history and doing so in their stead. She implies that this research into another culture led to her ultimate transition to appropriating black culture, heritage and becoming, in her words, "transracial".

The film also follows Dolezal and her two children, her biological son Franklin and her adopted son Izaiah (Izaiah was originally her adopted brother) and includes her pregnancy and early months in the life of her youngest son Langston, named after Langston Hughes. During the documentary, she is seen talking more than once about how she is forced to stay at home due to constant berating by the public.

== Production staff ==
The documentary was written by Jeff Seymann Gilbert and the film's director, Laura Brownson. Brownson has worked as a producer and director for twenty years in various genre including narrative films, television movies and documentaries. Brownson stated that covering Dolezal was a particularly frustrating subject for her. She told Buzzfeed, "I felt for two years that Rachel sort of stayed Rachel, and there was a moment where I felt that I really needed to confront her with, This is what I'm seeing in the world, and this is what I think the world would like to see from you and to see you do, and to, perhaps, watch you change. And you know, the harder I sort of pushed Rachel, the harder she pushed back. She does not change."

== Reviews ==
The documentary received mixed reviews. Vogue Magazine gave the filmmaker credit for "balanced treatment of her deeply problematic subject matter" while The New Yorker noted the film's value is in its portrait of family dynamics. "Eventually, Brownson locates the real story: a primitive power game between mother and child, one that forecasts calamity. And it is in this mode that The Rachel Divide becomes a disturbing and enthralling drama of the American family, the pain of its truths and its fictions." Forbes Magazine gave a positive review, calling it "an excellent documentary: intimate, artful and most importantly, nuanced".

Ben Kenigsberg of The New York Times said the film "...goes no more than skin-deep". About the director and Dolezal, Kenigsberg stated, "Ms. Brownson hasn’t figured out how to construct a movie around a figure who essentially owes her fame to the obfuscation of her past. Anything Ms. Dolezal says has to be taken with such a large grain of salt that it’s not clear why it’s worth listening." After seeing the film at the Tribeca Film Festival, Valerie Complex, African-American writer for The Playlist, said, "There is something sick, twisted and insulting about America's fixation with Rachel Dolezal and the way her lies have given her a platform, albeit a negative one, that most Black people don't have."

At the online film rating website, Rotten Tomatoes, The Rachel Divide received a 72% total aggregate score with 25 reviews and an average viewer rating of 5.6 out of 10.

== See also ==
- Black Lives Matter
- Identity politics
