= Jiří Doležal (ice hockey, born 1985) =

Czech ice hockey player

- Born: July 8, 1985 (age 40)
- Height: 5 ft 11 in (180 cm)
- Weight: 170 lb (77 kg; 12 st 2 lb)
- Position: Forward
- Shoots: Left
- Czech Extraliga team: HC Slavia Praha
- Playing career: 2007–present

Jiří Doležal (born July 8, 1985) is a Czech professional ice hockey forward who currently plays for HC Slavia Praha of the Czech Extraliga.

Doležal previously played for HC Baník Most. His father Jiří Sr and younger brother Tomáš were also professional hockey players (both played for Slavia Praha).
