= Jiří Doležal (ice hockey, born 1963) =

Czech ice hockey player

- Born: 22 September 1963 (age 62) Prague, Czechoslovakia
- National team: Czechoslovakia and Czech Republic

Jiří Doležal (born 22 September 1963) is a Czech former ice hockey player. He competed in the men's tournaments at the 1988 Winter Olympics and the 1994 Winter Olympics.

His sons Jiří Jr and Tomáš also played hockey professionally (both were forwards and played for HC Slavia Praha, where their father had ended his playing career and was also employed on the coaching staff).

== Career statistics ==
=== Regular season and playoffs ===
			Regular season					Playoffs
Season	Team	League	GP	G	A	Pts	PIM	GP	G	A	Pts	PIM
1983–84	TS Topoľčany	SVK.2
1984–85	TJ Sparta ČKD Praha	TCH	43	17	7	24	8	—	—	—	—	—
1985–86	TJ Sparta ČKD Praha	TCH	23	8	3	11	4	—	—	—	—	—
1986–87	TJ Sparta ČKD Praha	TCH	32	16	12	28	24	6	3	3	6
1987–88	TJ Sparta ČKD Praha	TCH	47	23	11	34	42	—	—	—	—	—
1988–89	TJ Sparta ČKD Praha	TCH	34	18	14	32	66	11	6	4	10
1989–90	TJ Sparta ČKD Praha	TCH	54	35	34	69	54	—	—	—	—	—
1990–91	JYP	SM-l	44	19	29	48	12	7	3	4	7	4
1991–92	JYP	SM-l	42	21	19	40	14	10	0	4	4	12
1992–93	JYP	SM-l	42	11	18	29	12	10	0	1	1	4
1993–94	EHC 80 Nürnberg	DEU.2	43	36	43	79	29	9	10	1	11	4
1994–95	EHC 80 Nürnberg	DEL	40	27	34	61	57	5	1	1	2	6
1995–96	Nürnberg Ice Tigers	DEL	47	20	30	50	22	5	3	1	4	6
1996–97	HC Slavia Praha	ELH	41	12	14	26	20	3	1	1	2	0
1997–98	HC Slavia Praha	ELH	45	12	16	28	22	3	2	2	4	4
1998–99	HC Slavia Praha	ELH	44	10	16	26	26	—	—	—	—	—
1999–2000	HC Slavia Praha	ELH	38	5	10	15	12	—	—	—	—	—
TCH totals			233	117	81	198	198	17	9	7	16	—
SM-l totals			128	51	66	117	38	27	3	9	12	20
ELH totals			168	39	56	95	80	6	3	3	6	4

=== International ===
Year	Team	Event	GP	G	A	Pts	PIM
1987	Czechoslovakia	WC	9	1	2	3	6
1987	Czechoslovakia	CC	6	0	1	1	4
1988	Czechoslovakia	OG	6	0	2	2	2
1989	Czechoslovakia	WC	10	3	2	5	4
1990	Czechoslovakia	WC	10	5	0	5	6
1991	Czechoslovakia	WC	10	3	3	6	10
1993	Czech Republic	WC	8	5	1	6	4
1994	Czech Republic	OG	8	3	1	4	6
1994	Czech Republic	WC	6	2	1	3	10
Senior totals			73	22	13	35	52

"Jiri Dolezal". Elite Prospects.
