= Hiding in Plain Sight =

Hiding in Plain Sight may refer to:

- Hiding in Plain Sight (Kendzior book), a 2020 nonfiction book by Sarah Kendzior
- Hiding in Plain Sight (novel), a 2014 novel by Nuruddin Farah
- "Hiding in Plain Sight", a 2024 single by Welsh rock band Manic Street Preachers from Critical Thinking
- "Hiding in Plain Sight", a song by Jessica Molaskey on the 2008 album A Kiss to Build a Dream On

== See also ==
- Hidden in Plain Sight (disambiguation)
- In Plain Sight (disambiguation)
- "Hiding in Plain View", a track from the album Metallic Spheres by the Orb
- Hide in Plain Sight, a 1980 film
