= Hidden in Plain Sight (disambiguation) =

Hidden in Plain Sight is a 2010 non-fiction book by Juha Suoranta.

Hidden in Plain Sight may also refer to:

- Hidden in Plain Sight (film), a 2003 documentary film
- Hidden in Plain Sight: What Really Caused the World's Worst Financial Crisis and Why It Could Happen Again, a 2015 book by Peter J. Wallison
- "Hidden in Plain Sight" (Quiet on Set: The Dark Side of Kids TV), a 2024 television episode

== See also ==
- Hide in Plain Sight, a 1980 film
- Hiding in Plain Sight (disambiguation)
- Hidden in Plain View (disambiguation)
