= Kuby =

Kuby may refer to:

- Adam Kuby (born 1961), American artist
- Clemens Kuby (born 1947), German documentary writer and film maker
- Erich Kuby (1910–2005), German journalist, publisher and screenwriter
- Gabriele Kuby (born 1944), German writer and sociologist
- Lauren Kuby, American politician and sustainability scientist
- Patrick Kuby, fictional character; see List of Breaking Bad characters § Kuby
- Ron Kuby (born 1956), American lawyer, radio talk show, host and television commentator

== See also ==
- Kuby-Młyny, a village in Poland
