= A Naked Needle =

1976 novel by Nuruddin Farah

- A Naked Needle, 1976 (Heinemann African Writers Series)
- Author: Nuruddin Farah
- Language: English
- Publisher: Heinemann
- Publication date: 1976
- OCLC: 1159882878

A Naked Needle is a 1976 novel by Somali writer Nuruddin Farah. It was Farah's second English language novel and was published as the 184th book in Heinemann's African Writers Series.

== Background ==
Following good reviews for his first novel, From A Crooked Rib, Farah produced a much more ambitious manuscript for A Naked Needle, which was accepted by James Currey for inclusion in the African Writers Series in 1972.

It was to be Farah's only novel written in Somalia. He had returned to the country in 1969 from India, where he had been studying Philosophy and Literature at Panjab University. In the same year a coup d'état had bought President Major General Mohamed Siad Barre to power at the head of a socialist military government.

Farah believed his country needed a revolution and was initially supportive of the new regime. But by 1971 his political awareness had grown and he began questioning the success of the revolution in Somalia. A Naked Needle was his response to the political corruption he saw and the need for national unity.

Comments on the first manuscript were received from Ros de Lanerolle and Richard Lister, who were largely supportive but also clear that it could not be published as it was. The manuscript went through several rewrites over the next three years, with Lister eventually losing patience on the third version. He reported that the novel was too obscure because Farah had previously written a thesis on James Joyce. Much more positive reviews were received by Henry Chakava, Heinemann's editor in East Africa, and Omolara Ogundipe-Leslie.

A Naked Needle was eventually published in July 1976 at a launch at the Africa Centre. By this time Farah had left Somalia to study Theatre at the universities of London and Essex, but was due to return home the same year. He left Britain for Rome with the intention of taking a plane to Mogadishu. However, when he called his brother in Somalia to arrange for someone to pick him up from the airport, he was told it was not safe to return because of the content of the novel. Farah remained in exile until 1996.

== Plot ==
Taking place over a single day in Mogadishu, A Naked Needle is the story of Koschin, a university professor and passionate revolutionary who is awaiting the arrival of Nancy, a woman he had met in London who had agreed to marry him. His faith in the 1969 revolution is strong but is not matched by his superiors at the university. Rather than compromise, he resigns and begins to wonder how Nancy will fit into Somali society. These thoughts are explored through Koschin's friends, who have already married foreign wives.

The novel describes various parts of Mogadishu as Koschin wanders the city, something that Farah considered a success: ‘...the real Mogadiscio today fades in comparison to the written-about Mogadiscio and so if somebody wants to reconstruct Mogadiscio today one may read A Naked Needle and see what street was called what, and what it looked like.’

== Reception ==
Jonty Driver, writing in The Guardian in July 1976, described the novel as ‘a witty, wordy, hilarious celebration of a modern African dilemma’.

In academic reviews, Koschin is seen as a Somali Stephen Dedalus engaging in intellectual debates with his friends in a manner quite unlike Farah's other novels.

In presenting his character in this way, Farah questions but does not denounce the revolution. His protagonist takes a ‘wait and see’ attitude as he weighs the positives and negatives. This contrasts with the opposition that Farah presents in his later novels to Barre's regime.
