= Kubly =

Kubly is a surname. Notable people with the surname include:

- Gary Kubly (1943–2012), American politician
- Herbert Kubly (1915–1996), American writer and playwright

== See also ==
- Kuby
