= Nuruddin Farah =

Somali novelist (born 1945)

Nuruddin Farah نورالدين فارح
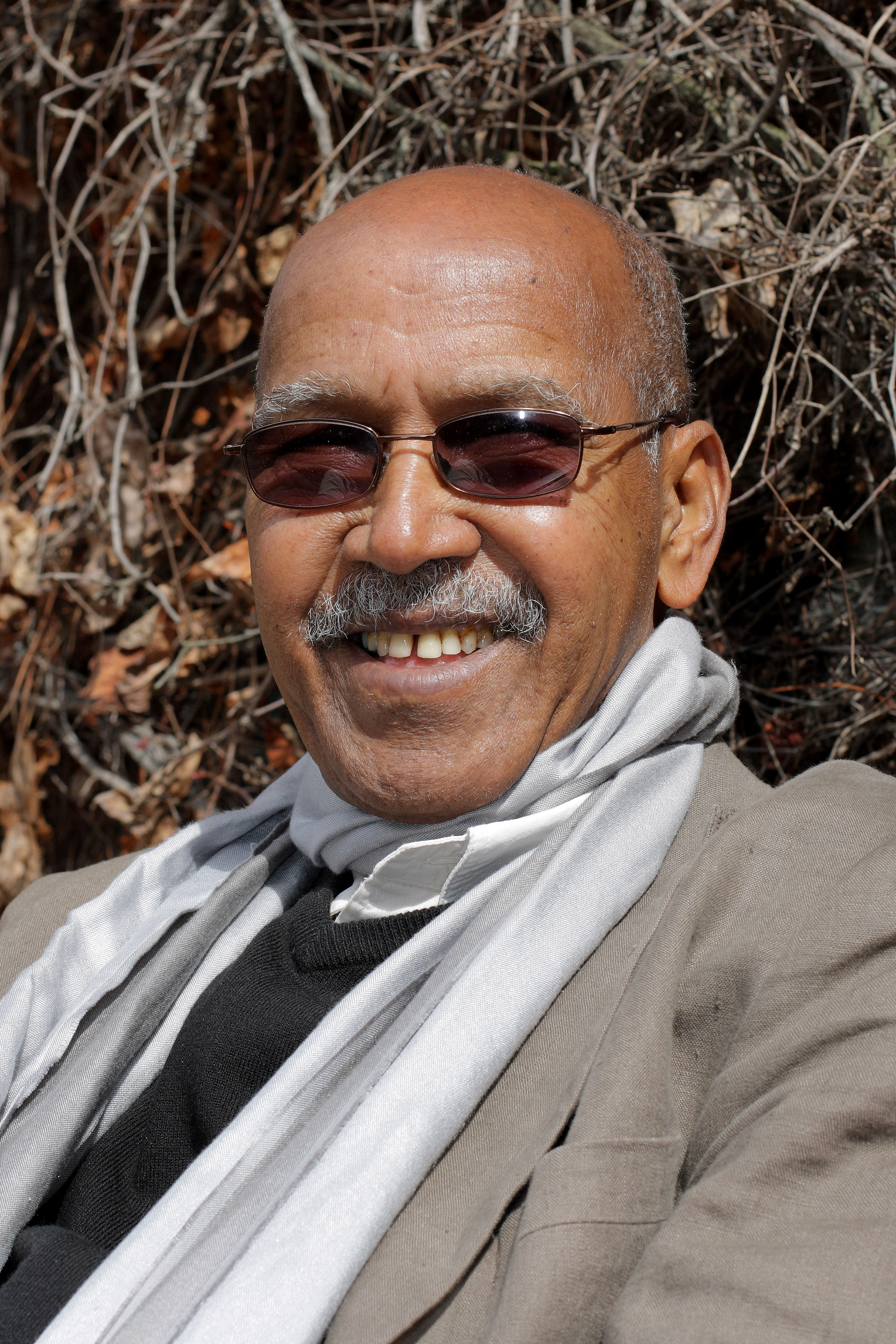
- Farah in 2010 before a lecture at Simon Fraser University.
- Born: Nuuradiin Faarax; 24 November 1945 (age 80); Baidoa, Somalia
- Education: Panjab University among many
- Occupations: Novelist, essayist, professor
- Spouse(s): Chitra Muliyil (1982–1992); Amina Mama (1992–2006)
- Children: Koshin (born 1983); Abyan (born 1994); Kaahiye (born 1995)
- Writing career
- Subjects: Nationalism, colonialism, feminism
- Notable works: From a Crooked Rib (1970); Sweet and Sour Milk (1979); Maps (1986); Gifts (1993); Secrets (1998)
- Notable awards: Kurt Tucholsky Prize, Lettre Ulysses Award, Neustadt International Prize for Literature, Premio Cavour, St. Malo Literature Festival Prize

Nuruddin Farah (Somali: Nuuradiin Faarax, Arabic: نورالدين فارح) (born 24 November 1945) is a Somali novelist. His first novel, From a Crooked Rib, was published in 1970 and has been described as "one of the cornerstones of modern East African literature today". Farah has also written plays both for stage and radio, as well as short stories and essays. Since leaving Somalia in the 1970s, he has lived and taught in numerous countries, including the United States, Britain, Germany, Italy, Sweden, Sudan, India, Uganda, Nigeria and South Africa.

Farah has garnered acclaim as one of the greatest contemporary writers in the world, his prose having earned him accolades including the Premio Cavour in Italy, the Kurt Tucholsky Prize in Germany, the Lettre Ulysses Award in Berlin, and in 1998, the Neustadt International Prize for Literature. In the same year, the French edition of his 1993 novel Gifts won the St Malo Literature Festival's prize. In addition, Farah is a perennial nominee for the Nobel Prize in Literature.

== Personal life ==
Nuruddin Farah was born in 1945 in Baidoa, in Italian Somaliland. His father Hassan Farah was a merchant and interpreter and his mother Aleeli (née Faduma) an oral poet. Farah was the fourth eldest boy in a large family.

As a child, Farah frequented schools in Somalia and adjacent Ethiopia, attending classes in Kallafo in Ogaden (now the Somali Region). He studied English, Arabic and Amharic. In 1963, he was forced to flee the region following the Ogaden Rebellion and subsequent border conflicts between Somalia and Ethiopia. He settled in independent Somalia, where he found work as a typist in the Ministry of Education.

From 1966 to 1970, he pursued a degree in philosophy, literature and sociology at Panjab University in Chandigarh, India, where he met his first wife, Chitra Muliyil Farah, with whom he had a son (the marriage later ended in divorce). Farah subsequently went to England, attending London University (1974–75) and studying for a master's degree in theatre at Essex University (1975–76). His mother died in 1990, and in 1992 he married British-Nigerian academic Amina Mama and they have a son and a daughter.

In 1990, he received a grant from the German Academic Exchange Service and moved to Berlin. In 1996, he visited Somalia for the first time in more than 20 years.

Farah's sister Basra Farah Hassan, a diplomat, was killed in a bombing in January 2014 while working with the United Nations in Kabul, Afghanistan.

Farah currently resides between Minneapolis, Minnesota, Cape Town, South Africa, and New York City, where he has been Distinguished Professor of Literature at Bard College since 2010.

== Literary career ==
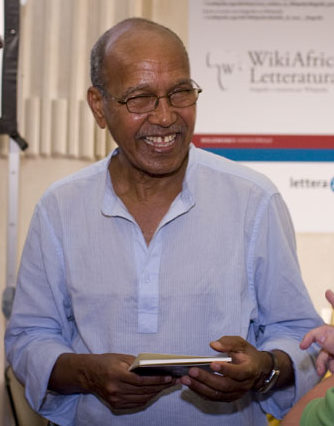
Farah at the Festivaletteratura in Mantua, September 2008.

After releasing an early short story in his native Somali language, Farah shifted to writing in English while still attending university in India. His books have been translated into 17 languages.

His debut novel, From a Crooked Rib (1970), told the story of a nomad girl who flees from an arranged marriage to a much older man. Published by Heinemann Educational Books (HEB) in their African Writers Series, the novel earned him mild but international acclaim. On a tour of Europe following the publication of A Naked Needle (HEB, 1976), Farah was warned that the Somali government planned to arrest him over its contents. Rather than return and face imprisonment, Farah began a self-imposed exile that would last for 22 years, during which time he taught in the United States, Germany, Italy, Sweden, Sudan, India and Nigeria.

Farah describes his purpose for writing as an attempt "to keep my country alive by writing about it", and for Nadine Gordimer he was one of the continent's "true interpreters". His trilogies of novels – "Variations on the Theme of an African Dictatorship" (1980–83) and "Blood in the Sun" (1986–99) – form the core of his work. First published by Allison and Busby, "Variations" included Sweet and Sour Milk (1979), Sardines (1981) and Close Sesame (1983), and was well received in a number of countries. Farah's reputation was cemented by his most famous novel, Maps (1986), the first volume of his "Blood in the Sun" trilogy. Maps, which is set during the Ogaden conflict of 1977, employs the innovative technique of second-person narration for exploring questions of cultural identity in a post-independence world. Farah followed this with Gifts (1993) and Secrets (1998), both of which earned awards. His subsequent "Past Imperfect" trilogy comprises Links (2004), Knots (2007) and Crossbones (2011). His most recent novels are Hiding in Plain Sight, published in 2014, and North of Dawn (2018). Writing in the Los Angeles Review of Books, Bhakti Shringarpure observed: "The most prolific writer Somalia has ever produced, Farah has indeed kept his country alive in our collective imaginations for the past 40 years. ... North of Dawn beautifully articulates the pervasive anxiety and nervous condition of being a migrant."

Farah is also a playwright, whose plays include work for the stage — A Dagger in Vacuum (produced Mogadiscio, 1970), The Offering (produced Colchester, Essex, 1975), Yussuf and His Brothers (produced Jos, Nigeria, 1982) — and for radio: Tartar Delight, 1980 (Germany), and A Spread of Butter.

Besides literature, Farah is an important scholar within Somali Studies. Additionally Farah has held a number of professorships across a variety of institutions around the world including University of Khartoum, University of Minnesota, Stony Brook UniversityBrown University, and since 2010 at Bard College, where he is Distinguished Professor of Literature, teaching intermittently between writing across the Literature, Written Arts, and Africana Studies departments at Bard College, where some of his colleagues have included other African luminaries in contemporary African and Diaspora literature including the Nigerian novelist Chinua Achebe, Ethiopian-American novelist, PEN American Center President, and Written Arts Program Department Head Dinaw Mengestu, and Nigerian-American Novelist, Photographer and Art Historian Teju Cole. Farah also serves on the International Advisory Board of Bildhaan: An International Journal of Somali Studies, published by Macalester College.

== Selected awards and honours ==
- 1974–76: UNESCO fellowship
- 1980: English-Speaking Union Literary Award (for Sweet and Sour Milk)
- 1990: Corman Artists fellowship
- 1991: Kurt Tucholsky Prize, Stockholm, Sweden
- 1993: Best Novel Award, Zimbabwe (for Gifts)
- 1994: Premio Cavour, Italy (for Italian translation of Close Sesame)
- 1998: Neustadt International Prize for Literature
- 1998: St Malo Literary Festival award (for French edition of Gifts)
- 2024: Royal Society of Literature International Writer

== Works ==
=== Novels ===
- — (1970). From a Crooked Rib. African Writers; 80. London: Heinemann Educational Books.
- — (1976). A Naked Needle. African Writers; 184. London: Heinemann Educational.
- — (2000). Territoires. Paris: Serpent à Plumes.
- — (2014). Hiding in Plain Sight. New York: Riverhead Books.
- — (2018). North of Dawn. Riverhead Books. ISBN 978-0735214231.

==== Variations on the Theme of an African Dictatorship trilogy ====
- — (1979). Sweet and Sour Milk. London: Allison & Busby.
- — (1981). Sardines. London: Allison & Busby.
- — (1983). Close Sesame. London: Allison & Busby.

==== Blood in the Sun trilogy ====
- — (1986). Maps. London: Pan.
- — (1993). Gifts. London: Serif.
- — (1998). Secrets. New York: Arcade. ISBN 9781559704274.

==== Past Imperfect trilogy ====
- — (2003). Links. Cape Town: Kwela Books.
- — (2007). Knots. New York: Riverhead Books. ISBN 9781594489242.
- — (2011). Crossbones. New York: Riverhead Books.

=== Short fiction ===
- — (1965). Why Die So Soon?. Novella
- — (22–29 December 2014). "The start of the affair". The New Yorker. Vol. 90, no. 41. pp. 130–139.

=== Plays ===
- — (1965). A Dagger in Vacuum.
- ̶̶̶̶̶̶̶̶̶̶̶̶̶̶̶̶— (1976) "The Offering". Lotus (Afro-Asian Writings), vol. 30, no. 4, pp. 77–93.

=== Non-fiction ===
- — (2000). Yesterday, Tomorrow: Voices from the Somali Diaspora. London: Cassell.
- — (16 December 2013). "Nelson Mandela". The Talk of the Town. Postscript. The New Yorker. Vol. 89, no. 41. pp. 26–27.
- — (12 August 2017). "This Is What Hunger Looks Like — Again". Sunday Review. The New York Times.

=== Essays ===
==== Autobiographical and literary essays ====
- "Celebrating Differences: The 1998 Neustadt Lecture", Emerging Perspectives on Nuruddin Farah, edited by Derek Wright, Africa World Press, 2002, pp. 15–24.
- "Childhood of My Schizophrenia", The Times Literary Supplement, 23–29 November 1990, p. 1264.
- "A Country in Exile", World Literature Today, vol. 72, no. 4, 1998, pp. 713–5. DOI: https://doi.org/10.2307/40154257.
- "The Creative Writer and the Politician". The Classic, vol. 3, no. 1, 1984, pp. 27–30.
- "Do Fences Have Sides?", The Commonwealth in Canada: Proceedings of the Second Triennial Conference of CACLALS, Part 2, edited by Uma Parameswaran, Writers' Workshop, 1983, pp. 174–82.
- "Do You Speak German?!", Okike: An African Journal of New Writing, vol. 22, 1982, pp. 33–8.
- "Germany—And All That Jazz", Okike: An African Journal of New Writing, vol. 18, 1981, pp. 8–12.
- "Ibsen, In Other Words", Nordlit, vol. 34, 2015, pp. 15–22. DOI: https://doi.org/10.7557/13.3350.
- "In Praise of Exile", Literature in Exile, edited by John Glad, Duke University Press, 1990, pp. 64–77.
- "Savaging the Soul of a Nation", The Writer in Politics, edited by William Glass and Lorin Cuoco. Southern Illinois University Press, 1996, pp. 110–5.
- "Why I Write". Emerging Perspectives on Nuruddin Farah, edited by Derek Wright. Africa World Press, 2002

==== Social and political essays ====
- "Bastards of Empire", Transition, vol. 65, 1995, pp. 26–35.
- "Centuries-long War for Somali Peninsula", WardheerNews, 12 April 2018.
- "Country Cousins", London Review of Books, 3 September 1998, pp. 19–20.
- "False Accounting", Granta, vol. 49, 1994, pp. 171–81.
- "My Life as a Diplomat", The New York Times. 26 May 2007.
- "Of Tamarind and Cosmopolitanism", African Cities Reader, edited by Ntone Edjabe and Edgar Pieterse. Chimurenga, 2010, pp. 178–81.
- "People of a Half-Way House", London Review of Books, 21 March 1996, pp. 19–20.
- "Praise the Marines? I Suppose So", The New York Times, 28 December 1992, pp. 14–17.
- "The Family House". Transition, vol. 99, 2008, pp. 6–15.
- "The Women of Kismayo", The Times Literary Supplement. 15 November 1996, p. 18.
- "Which way to the Sea, Please?" Horn of Africa, vol. 1, no. 4, 1978, pp. 31–6. Republished by WardheerNews, 4 March 2015.
