= Alexander Estis =

Russian-Swiss author, translator and journalist

- Александр Николаевич Эстис
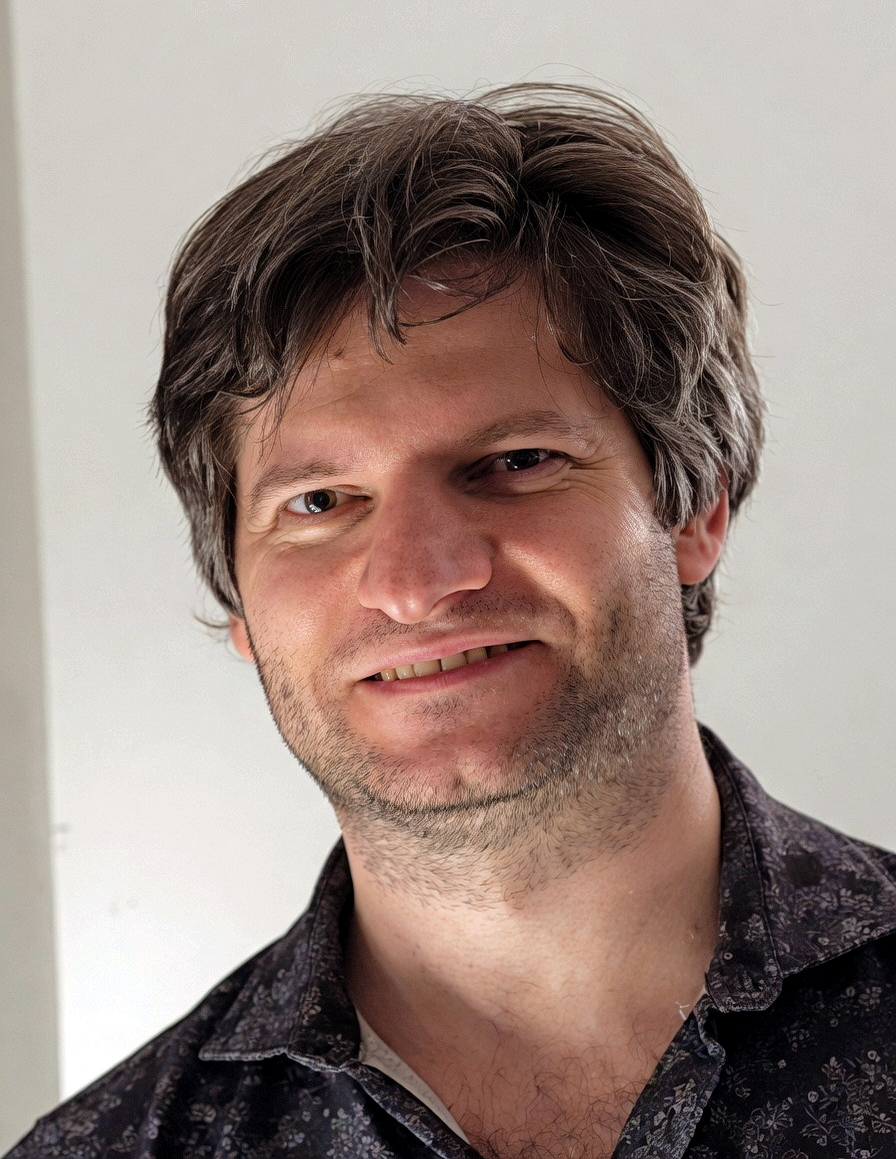
- Born: 20 September 1986 (age 39); Moscow, USSR
- Citizenship: Switzerland
- Education: University of Hamburg
- Occupations: Writer, translator, journalist
- Writing career
- Language: German, Russian
- Genre: Short prose
- Notable awards: Rolf Bossert Memorial Prize (2020); Dortmund Stadtschreiber Prize (2022); Kurt Tucholsky Prize (2023)
- Website: estis.ch

Alexander Estis (Russian: Александр Николаевич Эстис; born 20 September 1986 in Moscow) is a Russian-Swiss author, translator and journalist. His writing is mainly in German.

== Biography ==
Alexander Estis was born into the Jewish family of Soviet artists Nikolai Estis and Lidia Shulgina. From childhood, he studied drawing attending art schools and private lessons. In 1996, he moved with his parents to Hamburg.

He finished the Johannes Brahms High School in Pinneberg in 2004 and graduated from the Language Department of the Faculty of Humanities at the University of Hamburg in 2010. He has taught drawing, Latin, German, and modern German literature at the Gymnasium Heidberg (Hamburg) and Collège Calvin (Geneva) as well as medieval German literature and historical linguistics at the universities of Hamburg, Freiburg, Geneva, Zurich and the School of Management and Law at the Zurich University of Applied Sciences/ZHAW.

Since 2016, Estis has been living in Aarau. As an active participant in the literary process of the German-speaking community, he delivers lectures on literature, teaches courses in literary studies, and appears regularly on the radio station Deutschlandfunk Kultur.

As a writer, Estis works mainly in the genre of flash fiction (aphorisms, lyrical and stage miniatures, glosses, micronarratives, epigrams, essays), combining elements of essayism and speculative fiction, satirical and tragic devices, as well as traditional and rhythmic prose. He collaborates with German publishers Hochroth and parasitenpresse, at the same time contributing as a reviewer, observer and columnist to leading German-language media, including Die Zeit, Frankfurter Allgemeine Zeitung, Frankfurter Rundschau, Neues Deutschland, Süddeutsche Zeitung, The European (Germany), Neue Zürcher Zeitung, WOZ Die Wochenzeitung (Switzerland). He is the author of several short prose books and collections of journalism: Utterances of a Russian (2019), Statements on the Cultural Sector (2019), Stories of Langenthal Words (2021), The Explanatory Dictionary of the Russian Soul (2021), Lime Legends (2022), The Rondell (2022), Escapes (2022), BUGS (2024), In the Beginning Was Nonsense (2025), Henchman State Russia (2025). His prosaic works, translations, critical and philological articles have been published in Sinn und Form (Germany), Lichtungen (Austria), entwürfe (Switzerland), Inostrannaya Literatura, Literaturnaya Ucheba, Nezavisimaya Gazeta (Russia) and other noted literary magazines and newspapers.

Alexander Estis is a member of the Association of Swiss Authors and the German Exil-P.E.N.. He has won several literary prizes and grants, including the Rolf Bossert Memorial Prize (Germany, 2020), the Lydia Eymann Scholarship (Switzerland, 2020–2021), the Dortmund Stadtschreiber Prize (Germany, 2022), the Kurt Tucholsky Prize (Germany, 2023), and the Dresden Stadtschreiber Prize (Germany, 2025).

== Family ==
Alexander Estis is the son of artists Nikolai Estis (b. 1937) and Lidia Shulgina (1957–2000). His paternal half-sister and half-brother are museum specialist Elena Estis (b. 1958) and artist Oleg Estis (1964–1999).

== Bibliography ==
In Russian

- Вивег М. (2011). "Ангелы на каждый день". Иностранная Литература (2). Пер. с чеш. Нины Шульгиной; вступ. Александра Эстиса (Повседневные ангелы Вивега. С. 3—4): 3–77.
- Герман Г. (2013). "Ямбы и эпиграммы неизвестного эллина". Иностранная Литература (4). Пер. с нем. и вступ. [с. 113—116] Александра Эстиса: 113–121.
- Эстис А. Н. (2021). "Как не написать роман". Иностранная Литература (10). Пер. с нем. Елены Вишняковой: 278–279.

=== Books ===
In German

- Estis A. (2019). Sprüche des Russen. Mit Zeichnungen von Lydia Schulgina. Bielefeld [u.a.]: Hochroth Verlag. ISBN 978-3-903182-17-2.
- Estis A. (2019). Stellungnahmen zum Kulturbetrieb. Mit Karikaturen von Oleg Estis. Zürich: Amsel Verlag. ISBN 978-3-906325-42-2.
- Estis A. (2021). Langenthaler Wortgeschichten. Mit Illustrationen des Autors. Langenthal: Kulturbuchverlag Herausgeber. ISBN 978-3-905939-79-8.
- Estis A. (2021). Handwörterbuch der russischen Seele. Mit Zeichnungen von Lydia Schulgina. Köln: parasitenpresse. ISBN 978-3-947676-70-5.
- Estis A. (2022). Legenden aus Kalk. Erzählungen der Menschen eines Kölner Veedels, nacherzählt von Alexander Estis. Köln: parasitenpresse. ISBN 978-3-947676-81-1.
- Estis A. (2022). Das Rondell. Geschichten von Menschen auf Kölner Straßen. Unter Mitwirklung von Emina Faljić und Thomas Dahl, mit Fotos von Fadi Elias. Köln: parasitenpresse. ISBN 978-3-98805-008-3.
- Estis A. (2022). Fluchten. Mit Graphiken von Nikolai Estis. Salzburg: Edition Mosaik. ISBN 978-3-9505298-2-1.
- Estis A. (2024). BUGS. Hamburg: Verlag Literatur Quickie. ISBN 978-3-949512-36-0.
- Estis A. (2025). Am Anfang war Schmonzes. Jüdische Satiren. Mit Zeichnungen und Cartoons von Oleg Estis. Berlin: Satyr. ISBN 978-3-910775-42-8.
- Estis A. (2025). Schergenstaat Russland. Ideologie, Propaganda, Repression und Widerstand. Unter Mitarbeit von Jana Talke, Leni Karrer und Jennie Seitz. Basel: NZZ Libro. ISBN 978-3-03980-039-1.

=== Translations ===
Into German

- Chemlin M. (2018). "Dinge ohne Tod". Variations (26). Aus dem Russischen von Alexander Estis: 123–132.
- Schulgina L. (2019). Kommt auf einen Tee vorbei!. Text und Illustrationen von Lydia Schulgina. Aus dem Russischen übersetzt von Alexander Estis. Zürich: Amsel Verlag. ISBN 978-3-906325-45-3.

=== Articles ===
In German

2016

- Estis A. (2016). "Faulheit. Aus dem Buch der Formen". Artic. Texte aus der fröhlichen Wissenschaft (15).
- Estis A. (2016). "Wesen". Triëdere. Zeitschrift für Theorie und Kunst (14).
- Estis A. (2016). "Sprüche des Russen". Lichtungen. Zeitschrift für Literatur, Kunst und Zeitkritik (146).
- Estis A. (2016). "Die Zeitung ein Testament. Leben und Werk der Künstlerin Lydia Schulgina". David (108).
- Estis A. (2016). "Zwei Epigramme". Etcetera (65).
- Estis A. (2016). "Philologische Lügen". Karussell (5).

2017

- Estis A. (2017). "Traum. Aus dem Buch der Formen". Silbende Kunst (15).
- Estis A. (2017). "Untergang eines Königshauses". Die Novelle. Zeitschrift für Experimentelles (6): 150–154.
- Estis A. (2017). "Von den modernen Kunststücken". Sinn und Form (3/69).
- Estis A. (2017). "Schrift und Verwandlung (Auswahl)". Der Literaturbote (125).
- Estis A. (2017). "Takt". Schreibkraft (31): 60.

2018

- Estis A. (2018). "Hegels Haargel". Entwürfe (86): 119–120.
- Estis A. (2018). "Ich habe mich mit meinem Verleger angelegt". Schreibkraft (33): 36–37.
- Estis A. (2018). "Pirozhki". Ostragehege (90). Übers. aus dem Russischen.
- Estis A. (2018). "Das Eigentliche. Aus dem Buch der Formen". Artic. Texte aus der fröhlichen Wissenschaft (16).

2019

- Estis A. (2019). "Pirozhki (anonyme Internetgedichte)". Mosaik (28). Übers. aus dem Russischen.
- Estis A. (2019). "Die Hypnographien des Herrn H." SIGNUM (20/1): 38–42.
- Estis A. (2019). "Das Eigentliche. Aus dem Buch der Formen". Karussell (8).
- Estis A. (2019). "Schablone für einen beliebigen Bericht in einer noch beliebigeren Zeitung". Kliteratur (4).
- Estis A. (2019). "Immersion". Karussell (9).
- Estis A. (2019). "Garstige Glossen". Sinn und Form (2/71): 244–246.
- Estis A. (2019). "Prozessualisierung der Kunst". Entkunstung (III).

2020

- Estis A. (2020). "Leg dich nicht mit deinem Verleger an". Heft für Literatur, Stadt und Alltag (58).
- Estis A. (2020). "Ende eines Protagonisten". Helden – Anthologie zum Antho-logisch-Literaturpreis. Hg. v. Marco Frohberger. Frankfurt a. M.: Axel Dielmann Verlag.
- Estis A. (2020). "Die Hypnographien des Herrn H.". Druckreif – Ich Bin Raus. Autorenwettbewerb der Waderner Buchwoche 2020. Wadern: Kulturamt der Stadt Wadern.
- Estis A. (2020). "Kürzung. Ein Bericht". Druckreif – Ich Bin Raus. Autorenwettbewerb der Waderner Buchwoche 2020. Wadern: Kulturamt der Stadt Wadern.
- Estis A. (2020). "Umgekehrte Inselbegabung". Denkbilder (46).
- Estis A. (2020). "Wasserturm". Kalk-Alphabet. Hg. v. Jonas Linnebank. Köln: parasitenpresse.
- Estis A. (2020). "Ist die Natur wirklich gut?". Die Gazette (66).
- Estis A. (2020). "Politische Kunst. (Aus: Garstige Glossen)". Fluch't'raum (7).
- Estis A. (2020). "Typographische Wende". Schreibkraft (36).
- Estis A. (2020). "Kleines Neurotikon. Rolf-Bossert-Gedächtnispreis 2020". Spiegelungen (15). Mit Würdigung von Nora Iuga.
- Estis A. (2020). "Kleines Neurotikon. Rolf-Bossert-Gedächtnispreis". Bawülon (38). Mit Einleitung von Hellmut Seiler und Würdigung von Nora Iuga.
- Estis A. (2020). "In der Schwebe. Kosmische Komödie". Kliteratur (5).
- Estis A. (2020). "Vom Nutzen der Kunst". UND (9): 53.
- Estis A. (2020). "Kürzung". Erostepost (60). Ein Berich.

2021

- Estis A. (2021). "Kursorisch". Denkbilder (48).
- Estis A. (2021). "Die Vulgarität der Empörungskultur. Ein Aufschrei gegen den Aufschrei". Schreibkraft (36/37).
- Estis A. (2021). "El Niño". Klima und Andere Katastrophen. Texte des Monats 2020. Zürich: Literaturhaus Zürich. Archived from the original on 2020-10-29.
- Estis A. (January 7, 2021). "Das Menschlichste am Menschen". Frankfurter Rundschau.
- Estis A. (2021). "Bazzlan". Ostragehege (99). Übers. aus dem Russischen. Zweizeiler.
- Estis A. (April 1, 2021). "Vergesst die Relevanz! Verfängliche Legitimierungsstrategien in Zeiten der Pandemie". Kulturpolitische Gesellschaft.
- Estis A. (April 1, 2021). ""Eine alte Jumpfer, unbequem und bissig." Die Bürgerin Lydia Eymann". Fabrikzeitung (367).
- Estis A. (2021). "Man muß sich zur Faulheit entschließen". Ernst (18).
- Estis A. (2021). "Drei Mißempfindungen". SIGNUM (2/22).
- Estis A. (2021). "Prosaminiaturen". Sinn und Form (1/73).
- Estis A. (June 27, 2021). "Von Zwängen und Zwecken. Wir brauchen Kunst und Kultur nicht für etwas – sondern für uns. Dafür bedarf es aber Frieden und Freiheit". Neues Deutschland.
- Estis A (July 27, 2021). "Authentische Kunst oder künstliche Authentizität? Über einen zentralen Begriff der zeitgenössischen Ästhetik". Neues Deutschland.
- Estis A. (2021). "Russland von B bis Z". Tages-Anzeiger (31).
- Estis A. (2021). "Aus dem kleinen Neurotikon". Bawülon (42).
- Estis A. (2021). "Wer schreibt, schreibt für später". Ernst (19).
- Estis A. (October 9, 2021). "Der paradoxe Jude. Ein Diskurs über Definierwütigkeit und Identitäten". Neues Deutschland.
- Estis A. (November 29, 2021). "Mein Name sei Essig". Neues Deutschland.

2022

- Estis A. (January 18, 2022). "Auf einen gesunden Skandal. Ein symptomatischer Bericht". Neues Deutschland.
- Estis A. (January 21, 2022). "Kommt ein Russe nach Moskau". Tages-Anzeiger (3).
- Estis A. (2022). "Wo finde ich Leichtigkeit? In". Ernst (21).
- Estis A. (February 1, 2022). "Mein Name sei Essig". Literaturportal Bayern.
- Estis A. (March 11, 2022). "Hasst die russischen Kriegstreiber – nicht die Russen". Tages-Anzeiger (10).
- Estis A. (March 16, 2022). "Putin-Versteher werden". Ukraine-Blog der WOZ.
- Estis A. (March 17, 2022). "Alles stürzt in sich zusammen". Die Zeit.
- Estis A. (March 22, 2022). "Die Logik des Kollektiven. Über russische Musikerinnen, helvetische Ausladungen und die europäische Freiheit". Ukraine-Blog der WOZ.
- Estis A. (April 11, 2022). "Es hätte genügt". Jüdischer Salon am Grindel.
- Estis A. (2022). "Alles wird Asche". OMANUT.
- Estis A. (April 26, 2022). "Der moralische Standpunkt ist ein Ort in Russland". Ukraine-Blog der WOZ.
- Estis A. (April 29, 2022). "Sondereinsatz und Frieden. Satirische Reaktionen auf eine Tragödie". Neue Zürcher Zeitung Folio (14).
- Estis A. (May 3, 2022). "Wie konnte das geschehen? Die Rolle der Kunst in Zeiten von Krisen und Kriegen. Interview mit Danila Korogodsky". Neues Deutschland.
- Estis A. (May 4, 2022). "Befangene Bilder. Wie das Russische Haus der Wissenschaft und Kultur den Überfall auf die Ukraine ignoriert und sich über Proteste empört". Tagesspiegel.
- Estis A. (June 18, 2022). "Verhaftet im Wahn. Wie der Kreml im eigenen Volk Angst und Verunsicherung sät". Neue Zürcher Zeitung.
- Estis A. (July 8, 2022). "Faktoren einer Katastrophe". Ukraine-Blog der WOZ.
- Can S., Akçit H. (July 27, 2022). "Dem Krieg etwas entgegensetzen. Interview mit Alexander Estis". Heinrich-Böll-Stiftung.
- Estis A. (August 19, 2022). "Die fünf großen D. Statt Exponiergehabe und Vorzeigediversität braucht es konzertierte Aktionen zur Förderung von Kunst und Kultur". Neues Deutschland.
- Estis A. (August 23, 2022). "Russische Seele – das Ende eines Mythos". Süddeutsche Zeitung.
- Estis A. (August 25, 2022). "Putins pervertierte Universitäten". Frankfurter Allgemeine Zeitung.
- Estis A. (September 2, 2022). "Es gibt niemanden, der noch nie die Flucht ergriff. Fünf kurze Geschichten über das Verlassen und Verlassenwerden". Neue Zürcher Zeitung Folio (357). Alexander Estis (Text), Nikolai Estis (Illustrationen).
- Estis A. (September 10, 2022). ""Nehmt ihr mein Pferd? Ich schenke es euch!" – Flüchtlinge aus der Ukraine erzählen von ihren Tieren. Auch von jenen, die sie im Krieg zurücklassen mussten. Drei Geschichten besonderer Beziehungen". Neue Zürcher Zeitung.
- Estis A. (September 15, 2022). "Schon in der Schule werden sie auf Krieg gedrillt". WOZ (37).
- Estis A. (2022). "Museumsbesuch". Aarauer Kurzgeschichten. Riedtwil: Kulturbuchverlag Herausgeber.
- Talke J., Estis A. (November 4, 2022). "Wie wäre die Documenta noch zu retten?". Neue Zürcher Zeitung.
- Estis A., Talke J. (November 5, 2022). "Frieden in Schwarz auf Weiß". Frankfurter Allgemeine Zeitung.
- Estis A. (December 15, 2022). "Russische Propaganda. Das Halbwahre belegen, das Unwahre hinzuschmuggeln". WOZ (50).
- Estis A. (December 22, 2022). "Als der Menschheit im Weltall die Lust verging. Leseprobe: "Fluchten", das neue Buch von Alexander Estis". Neues Deutschland.
- Estis A. (December 26, 2022). "Acht Sterne gegen Putlers Krieg. Die Opfer der russischen Aggression schiessen zurück, auch mit Worten. Ein kleines Lexikon der Kriegs-Neologismen". Tages-Anzeiger.

2023

- Talke J., Estis A. (January 14, 2023). "Kunst im Spannungsfeld des Ukrainekrieges". Neue Zürcher Zeitung.
- Estis A. (2023). "Feindbilder der Kreml-Propaganda. Erst Hitler, dann Satan". Tages-Anzeiger (14).
- Estis A. (2023). "Antragsprosa". Avenue. Magazin für Wissenskultur (10).

In English

2023

- Estis A. (2023). Goralik, Linor (ed.). "The Bernese Mountain Dog. Natalka. Soot". Resistance and Opposition Arts Review. Sixth Issue. Transl. by Michael Gluck.
