= Finnish studies =

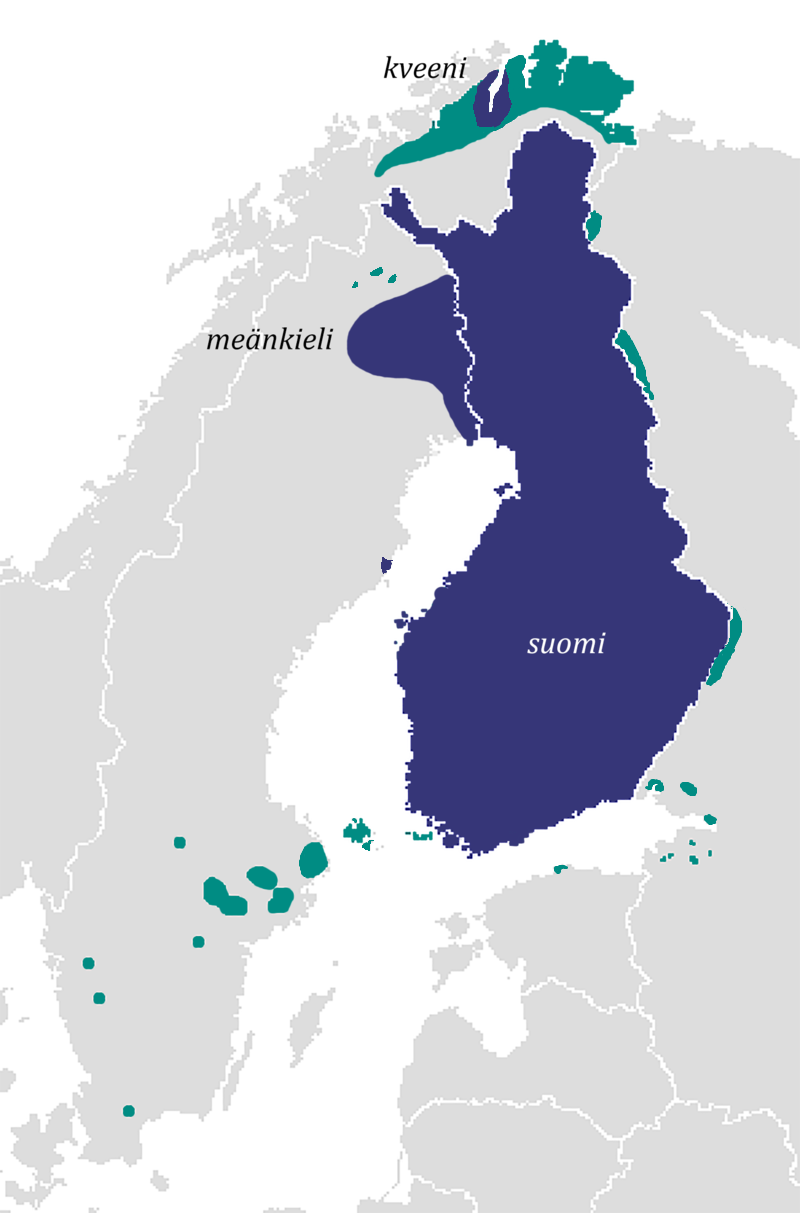
Map of the areas where the Finnish language is spoken. In addition to Finland, the Finnish language has official status in the Tornio Valley and the municipality of Umeå (Meänkieli/Finnish) and in the municipality of Porsang (Kvean/Finnish). There is an Ingrian-Finnish minority in St. Petersburg.

Finnish studies is a research area which is part of humanities and social sciences, and usually studies Finnish language, Finnish culture and Finnish history.

== Finnish studies in North America ==
In Canada there are Finnish studies activities in the University of Toronto, and Lakehead University in Thunder Bay. Toronto Chair is occupied by one individual at a time as Lakehead has a rotating position for scholars from Finland. In the United States Finnish studies are available at the Columbia University (New York), at the University of Washington (Seattle), University of Wisconsin (Madison), University of Minnesota (Minneapolis) and at Indiana University (Bloomington). In addition, some Finnish language and culture courses are offered at Finlandia University (Hancock), at University of California (Berkeley), and at the University of Oregon (Eugene).

The University of Minnesota has held the Government of Finland and David and Nancy Speer Visiting Professorship in Finnish Studies from 1989. The chair was established in with the joint efforts of the Government of Finland, University of Minnesota, and Mr. David Speer. In the early 1990s the chair changed into visiting professorship. The following persons have been visiting in the position in the previous years.

- 1992 (Spring) Pertti Pesonen (1931–2005) (Political Science, University of Tampere)
- 1992 (Fall) Aulis Aarnio (Law, University of Tampere)
- 1992 (Fall) Raimo Väyrynen (International Politics, University of Helsinki)
- 1994 (Spring) Elina Haavio-Mannila (Sociology, University of Helsinki)
- 1994 (Fall) Kaarle Nordenstreng (University of Tampere)
- 1996 (Winter) Clas Zilliacus (Literature, Åbo Akademi University)
- 1996 (Fall) Risto Alapuro (Sociology, University of Helsinki)
- 1998 (Winter) Max Engman (History, Åbo Akademi University)
- 1998 (Winter) J.P. Roos (Sociology, University of Helsinki)
- 1998 (Spring) A. William Hoglund (History, University of Connecticut)
- 1998 (Fall) Hannu Nurmi (Political Science, University of Turku)
- 1999 (Winter) Eero Tarasti (Musicology, University of Helsinki)
- 1999 (Spring) Marjatta Hietala (History, University of Tampere)
- 2000 (Spring) Leena Ahtola-Moorhouse (Art History, Ateneum Art Museum)

Full academic years:

- 2003-2004 Pauliina Raento (Geography, University of Helsinki)
- 2004-2005 Pauliina Raento (Geography, University of Helsinki)
- 2005-2006 Juha Suoranta (Sociology, Education, University of Tampere)
- 2006-2007 Mika Aaltola (Political Science, University of Tampere)
