= Hidden in Plain View (disambiguation) =

Hidden in Plain View is an American pop punk/post-hardcore band.

Hidden in Plain View may also refer to:

- Hidden in Plain View (EP), an EP by Hidden in Plain View
- Hidden in Plain View: A Secret Story of Quilts and the Underground Railroad, a book by Jacqueline Tobin and Raymond Dobard about the theory of quilts of the Underground Railroad

== See also ==
- "Hiding in Plain View", a track from the album Metallic Spheres by the Orb
- Hidden in Plain Sight
