= Herrsching am Ammersee =

- Municipality
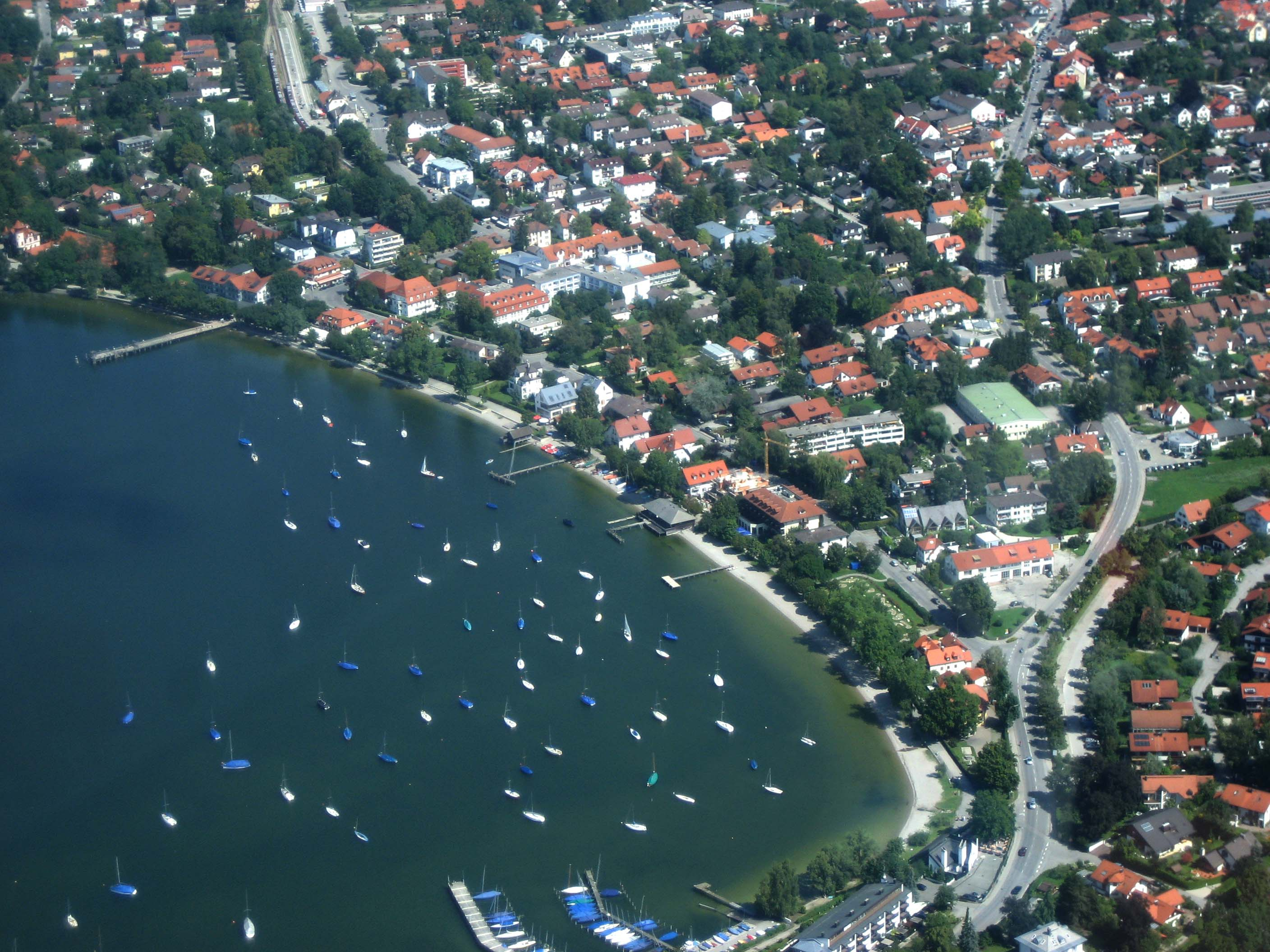
- Aerial view

- Coat of arms

- Location of Herrsching am Ammersee within Starnberg district
- Interactive map of Herrsching am Ammersee
- Location within Germany Location within Bavaria
- Coordinates: 48°00′N 11°11′E
- Country: Germany
- State: Bavaria
- Admin. region: Oberbayern
- District: Starnberg
- Subdivisions: 3 Ortsteile

Government
  - Mayor (2020–26): Christian Schiller (Ind.)

Area
  - Total: 20.88 km^{2} (8.06 sq mi)
- Elevation: 568 m (1,864 ft)

Population (2025-12-31)
  - Total: 11,186
  - Density: 535.7/km^{2} (1,388/sq mi)
- Time zone: UTC+01:00 (CET)
  - Summer (DST): UTC+02:00 (CEST)
- Postal codes: 82211
- Dialling codes: 08152
- Vehicle registration: STA, WOR
- Website: www.herrsching.de

Herrsching am Ammersee (German pronunciation: [ˈhɛʁʃɪŋ ʔam ˈʔamɐˌzeː], lit. 'Herrsching on the Ammersee') is a municipality in Upper Bavaria, Germany, on the east shore of the Ammersee, southwest of Munich. The population is around 8,000 in winter, increasing to 13,000 in summer.

Situated at one terminus of the Munich S-Bahn line S8, the village is popular with travellers for its water-sports and as the starting point of trips to the Benedictine Andechs Abbey. Herrsching is also a stop for touring steamships of the Bavarian Seenschiffahrt or lake fleet.

Herrsching is home for the unit finance of "college of public service in Bavaria". Prior to the Second World War, it was there the Reichsfinanzschule Hersching. From 1943 to 1946, the school was converted into a hospital and rehab facility for soldiers who had lost limbs.

== Main sights ==
Notable sights include

- the lake-front promenade (at about 5 km, the longest one in Germany)
- Kurparkschlössl (Little castle), built in 1888 by the artist Ludwig Scheuermann
- Historic paddle-wheel steamships Herrsching and Diessen docking at the harbour in summer
- St. Martin's church
- Zur Post Gasthof from 1567
- Archaeological Park, a 7th-century settlement of the Bavarians.

== Personality ==
- Rainer Rene Graf Adelmann von Adelmannsfelden (born 1948), former lawyer
- Arno Assmann (1908–1979), actor
- Martin Benrath (1926–2000), actor
- Helene Böhlau (1856–1940), writer, buried in Widdersberg
- David Coverdale (born 1951), singer of the band Deep Purple 1973-1976
- Roderich Fick, (1886–1955), architect, lived and worked in the "Old Mill", Mühlfeld from 1920 to 1955
- Camilla Horn (1903–1996), actress
- Clemens Kuby (born 1947), documentary filmmaker and author
- Christian Morgenstern (1871–1914), poet: his widow Margareta lived from 1919 until her death in 1968 in Breitbrunn.
- Burkard Freiherr von Müllenheim-Rechberg (1910—2003), naval officer and diplomat
- Alfred Ploetz (1860–1940), physician and eugenicist
- Rudi Schuricke (1913–1973), singer, actor, lived from 1955 to 1973 in Herrsching, owner of the former Hotel Seespitz
- Klaus Wennemann (1940–2000), actor
- Harald Winter (born 1953), artist
