= Rainer Rene Graf Adelmann von Adelmannsfelden =

German lawyer (born 1948)

- Born: 1948 (age 77–78); Wartaweil, Bavaria
- Other name: Rene Freiherr von Godin
- Occupation: Lawyer
- Known for: Founder of the Federation of German mercenaries
- Criminal charge: Trafficking of asylum seekers
- Criminal penalty: 15 month probation
- Spouse: Michaela Gräfin Adelmann von Adelmannsfelden
- Children: Eleven

Rainer Rene Graf Adelmann von Adelmannsfelden (born Rene Freiherr von Godin, 1948) is a former German lawyer best known for founding the Bund deutscher Legionäre (English: Federation of German mercenaries), the Christliche Vereinigung zur Familienförderung (English:Christian association for family development), an agency dealing with the adoption of unborn babies and a business in dealing with organ donations. He also operated a number of other business entities, like the Der Wettbewerbsbeobachter (English:The competition monitor) and the Zentralkomitee für die Allgemeinbefolgung obergerichtlicher Rechtssprechung in Wettbewerbssachen, both targeting small businesses who made small clerical errors in advertisement by "fining" them or taking them to court for violating Competition law.

After failing his training as catholic Deacon because he had been a member of the youth organisation of the Social Democratic Party of Germany, Adelman formed his own church, the Erzbistum München der heiligen katholischen orthodoxen evangelischen Kirche des heiligen Apostels Matthäus (English:Archbishopric of Munich of the holy catholic orthodox church of the apostle Matthew) and awarded offices within the church. He also operated a funeral business for a time. Additionally, he ventured into the business of trafficking asylum seekers to Germany, proposing to combine the former with his organ donor business if the asylum seekers were unable to pay.

It was for his role in the trafficking of asylum seekers and providing them with false papers that he was sent to 15 month in jail on probation in 1992. When his house was searched by the police in 1987 in connection to the trafficking of asylum seekers, it was the 14th time that the police had done so in just a few years. German newspaper Die Zeit described his reputation as a "businessman without scruple". He was mainly active in the 1980s and, during that time, attracted media attention, but has not done so since his conviction in 1992. By his own description, Graf Adelmann is a "man with many ideas".

== Biography ==
Rainer Rene Graf Adelmann von Adelmannsfelden was born under the name Rene Freiherr von Godin as the son of a Bavarian lawyer in 1948. He married Michaela Gräfin Adelmann von Adelmannsfelden (born 1953) in 1973 and the couple had ten children, born between 1974 and 1988. His wife is the niece of the late German federal MP (1957–1961) Raban Graf Adelmann (1912–1992). Rene Freiherr von Godin assumed the name Graf Adelmann von Adelmannsfelden in 1980. During the mid-1980s, the couple resided in the village of Sentenhart, near Wald, between Lake Constance and Sigmaringen.

The Bavarian ministry of justice cancelled Graf Adelmann's registration as a lawyer in the state in 1982 for discrediting acts unworthy of a lawyer, however, Adelman took the case to the Bundesgerichtshof but eventually decided to discontinue his registration himself.

== Federation of German mercenaries ==
Graf Adelmann, in the early 1980s, founded the Federation of German mercenaries for the purpose of recruiting mercenaries in Germany for service in Asian and African countries.

German law prohibits the recruitment of German citizens for military service in foreign countries and the very attempt is punishable with up to five years of jail. However, Graf Adelmann considered this law invalid as it, in his opinion, violates the freedom of employment specified in the German constitution.

He operated his business through the company Terfina Vermögensverwaltungs-GmbH, and contacted foreign, mainly Asian and African embassies and governments for the purpose of building a clientele. By 1985, Graf Adelmann had over 400 job applications, targeting former Bundeswehr soldiers and unemployed adventurers through newspaper ads. In 1985, he claimed to have received interest from an undisclosed African country for the purpose of protecting an oil pipeline.

He also claimed to have interests from Mozambique to provide personnel for the protection of the Cahora Bassa Dam. He saw an opportunity to provide personnel to developing countries who still "required adjustments to their borders and forms of government" but lacked qualified personnel to operate their modern weapons equipment. His initial plan was to recruit a platoon of 50 mercenaries, led by a number of retired Bundeswehr sergeants.

To join the Bund deutscher Legionäre, BDL, one had to pay DM 20 as a joining fee, followed by another DM 20 as a yearly membership fee. For this, Graf Adelmann promised combat training in Belgium and shooting practise in Switzerland, at the weapons manufacturers premises. His new recruits would have to "learn to kill" but he saw great potential in 18-year-olds in this regard. He also guaranteed that the bodies of fallen "heroes" would be returned to Germany and their memory adequately honoured.

== Christian association for family development ==
Another business Graf Adelmann operated was the Christian association for family development, targeted at childless parents who were interested in adopting an as yet unborn or unconceived, baby. The association was officially shut down in the mid-1980s but continued to operate nevertheless. Adelman charged up to DM 32,000 for a successful adoption, with part of this money going to the mother of the child. The Prosecutors Office at Konstanz investigated against the business but was unable to prosecute as it violated no existing law at the time, declaring Adelmann had found a loop hole.

He later opened an agency for adoption in Frankfurt am Main in early 1988 but had to close after the mayor of the city ordered it shut down. The business suffered a temporary setback when his aunt was arrested in Manila for kidnapping but later released.

== Organ donation business ==
In the business of organ donations, Graf Adelmann would approach people who recently had to declare bankruptcy, as published in the Bundesanzeiger, a federal publication, and offered to help them to financial recovery by paying up to DM 80,000 for a kidney, depending on the quality of the organ. Surgery would then be performed in France, Adelman claiming that organ donation for money being legal there despite the fact that both French and German doctors had voluntarily outlawed such transactions. In France however at the time, donations from live donors were acceptable, providing no money was involved. Graf Adelmann just simply would keep the full truth from the performing clinic and thereby was able to carry out his business. Graf Adelmann later declared that no operations were carried out. In 1989, he tried to expand his business to the United Kingdom and was able to find a number of willing donors there, offering between US$30,000 and 50,000 per kidney, with the intention of making a 20% cut on every operation. The willing donors never heard from Graf Adelmann again after the initial contact. Shortly after, the British Parliament banned the sale of human organs for the purpose of transplants.

Graf Adelmann's activities even prompted a request in the German Parliament, the Bundestag, in 1989, to tighten the organ donor law in the country and to shorten the lengthy donation process. A number of MP's of the Social Democratic Party of Germany posted the question what the federal government would do against Adelmann's activities.
