= Gabriele Kuby =

German writer and sociologist

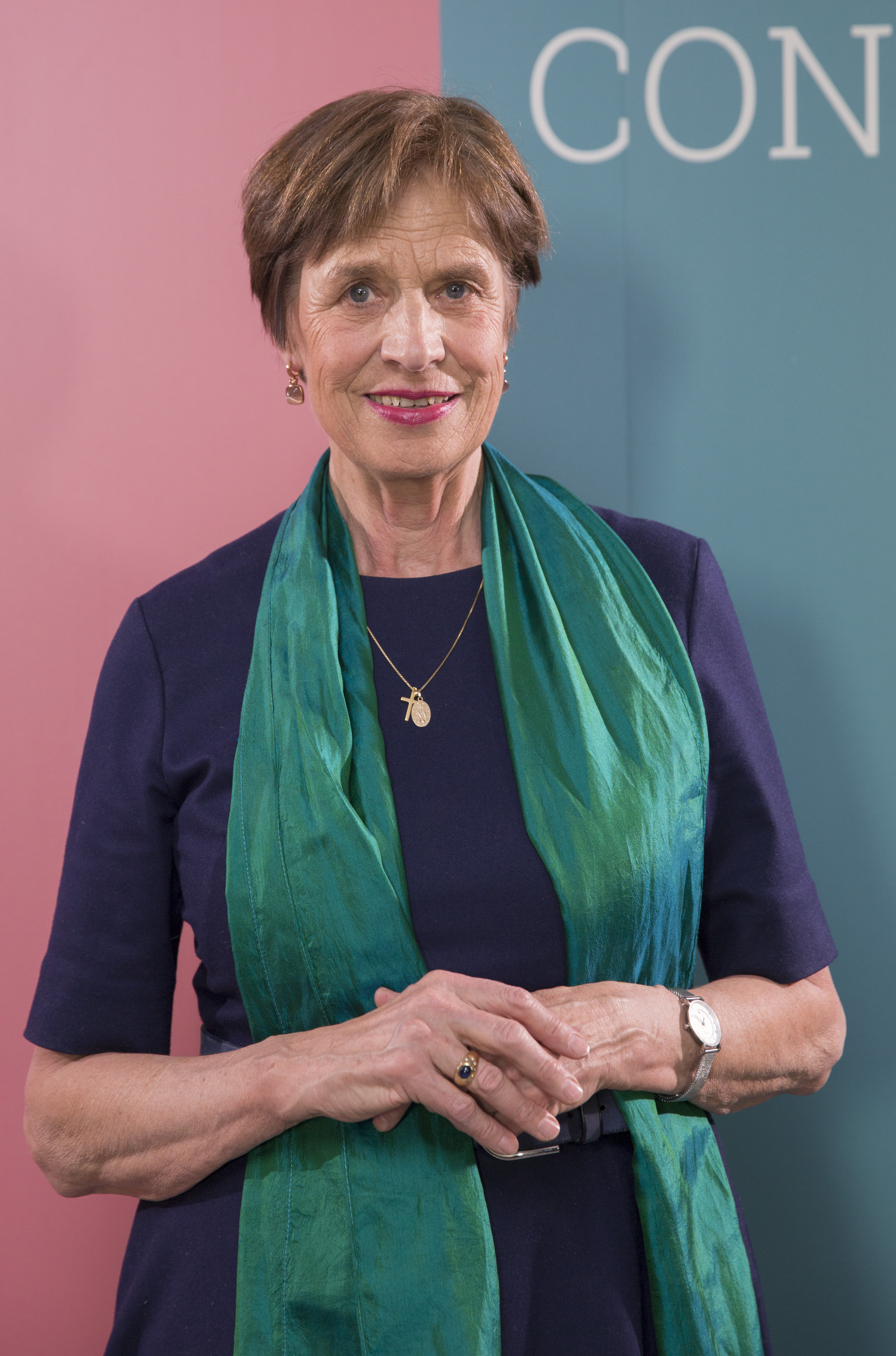
Gabriele Kuby in 2014

Gabriele Kuby (born 1944) is a German writer and sociologist. She is a convert from Protestantism to Roman Catholicism, and is noted for her Traditionalist Catholic ideas and orthodox positions on sexuality and gender, which are stated in works like The Global Sexual Revolution: The Destruction of Freedom in the Name of Freedom. She also became known for criticizing the morality of the Harry Potter series.

== Personal life ==
Kuby was born in Konstanz, Germany. She is the daughter of Erich Kuby, sister of Clemens Kuby, and niece to Werner Heisenberg and E. F. Schumacher. Kuby is mother of three children, holds a degree in sociology earned at Berlin, and completed her master's degree in Konstanz. Her daughter, Sophia Kuby, a devout Catholic convert, is anti-abortion activist and lobbyist since her own conversion in the year 2000.

== Positions ==
=== World Congress of Families (WCF) ===
The World Congress of Families (WCF) organizes regular conferences. It is a United States coalition promoting Christian right values, opposing same-sex marriage, pornography, and abortion. The Southern Poverty Law Center included WCF to the list of organizations it considers as anti-LGBT hate groups. In 2014, the WCF conference scheduled in Moscow was suspended following the Russo-Ukrainian War. A congress happened without official presence of the WCF. The chair of one of the organizations involved, Concerned Women for America, said: "We have decided not to go to Russia. I do not want to give the impression of granting comfort and assistance to Vladimir Putin." Kuby nonetheless attended the conference, stating that "Central and Eastern European nations" in particular had "begun to recognize that membership in the European Union has its costs (...) the forced destruction of their own value system".

=== Conservatism ===
Kuby advocates for conservative and Christian-Catholic socio-political positions, in which she defends the positions of the church's teachings.

In the observance of traditional sexual norms, she sees an important existential question of Christianity. She defends celibacy and sees the sexual abuse of children as a problem of society and not as a specific problem of the Roman Catholic Church. She believes that the media's coverage of the issue in connection with the Church is an attempt to "force the Church to its knees."

=== Attitude towards chastity ===
In August 2010, Kuby spoke at the "Joy in Faith" congress in Fulda about the Christian virtue concept of chastity. The lecture was published in a revised form in the journal Theologisches. Kuby defended the virtue of chastity against what she saw as unrestrained and watered-down sexual morality. She describes the virtue of chastity as having been "disposed of" during and after the 68 student movement.

=== Criticism of contraception and abortion ===
Regarding contraception and abortion, she addresses the demographic development at the national level and describes Germans as a "dying nation" and Germany as a "nursing home."

=== Criticism of kindergartens ===
Kuby is against the care of children under the age of three in day-care centers, as she believes that this leads to irreversible attachment damage that only fully manifests itself during puberty. According to Kuby, day-care centers in Sweden have led to "one in three children [...] having psychological problems." In this context, she also criticizes the fact that the Federal Ministry for Family Affairs considers "gender mainstreaming" to be an essential task of politics, neglecting the promotion of families and measures against the growing social and psychological distress of children and adolescents.

=== Criticism of sex education ===
In the summer of 2007, Kuby accused the German federal government and some state governments in an essay in the Junge Freiheit newspaper of "sexualizing" children from an early age and promoting gay and lesbian lifestyles in schools with educational brochures such as "Körper, Liebe, Doktorspiele" ("Body, Love, Doctor's Games"), with the aim of eliminating the differentiation between male and female genders.

=== Attitudes towards LGBT ===
Kuby does not consider all "sexual orientations" ("hetero-, homo-, bi-, trans[sexual]") and every form of sexuality ("gay, lesbian, bi-, trans-, metrosexual – anal and oral sex") to be of equal value, and refers to acceptance of non heterosexual orientation and self-determination of gender identity as "madness".

Kuby adheres to the classification of anti-homosexuals and the ex-gay movement. For her, both transsexuality and homosexuality are a sexual orientation and a disorder of gender identity.

According to Kuby, the decision by the American Psychiatric Association (APA) in 1973 to remove homosexuality from the DSM-II marked a significant "reversal" in societal attitudes towards homosexuality, and she describes the Gay Liberation Front as operating "aggressively and manipulatively " within the APA . She describes same-sex relationship as rarely permanent and opposes same-sex marriage. She regrets that one can now face opposition for saying that homosexuality is "a use of the body that does not correspond to its design (common sense)" "is a disregard of God's plan of creation" or "poses a significant health and psychological risk".

She views homophobia as a "neologism coined in the late 1960s by psychoanalyst and homosexual activist Georg Weinberg to defame people who reject homosexuality as neurotic."

=== Jordan Peterson ===
In an interview with LifeSiteNews, Kuby expresses both admiration and disappointment towards Jordan Peterson. She commends him for refusing to use chosen pronouns of actor Elliot Page in his tweets, saying he had qualities of a "hero". However, during the same interview, she voices her disapproval of Peterson's podcast with Dave Rubin. In that podcast, Peterson had discussed his friend's same-sex marriage and declared that same-sex marriage had become a part of the marriage structure. She says Jordan Peterson sacrificed the title of his previous essay "we are sacrificing our children on the altar of a brutal, far-left ideology", arguing that "this is what we are doing with gay marriage and artificial reproduction".

Kuby sent an open letter to Jordan Peterson where she says: "You seem to have given in to the immense cultural pressure of the sexual revolution, and for that, I am deeply disappointed." She accuses him of "tearing down the walls of the anthropological foundation of human existence".

=== Harry Potter ===
In 2002, Kuby published her first critical book on Harry Potter, "Harry Potter - The Global Push into Occult Heathenism," and in 2003, a second book, "Harry Potter - Good or Evil?" After doubts about the Vatican's stance on Harry Potter arose in the media, she sent her first book to then-Cardinal Joseph Ratzinger. In his response letter, he wrote: "It is good that you clarify things about Harry Potter, because these are subtle seductions that work invisibly and deeply, and that corrode Christianity in the soul before it has a chance to grow." After Ratzinger was elected pope, his judgment on Harry Potter received worldwide media attention.
