= Margarete Stokowski =

Polish-German writer and essayist

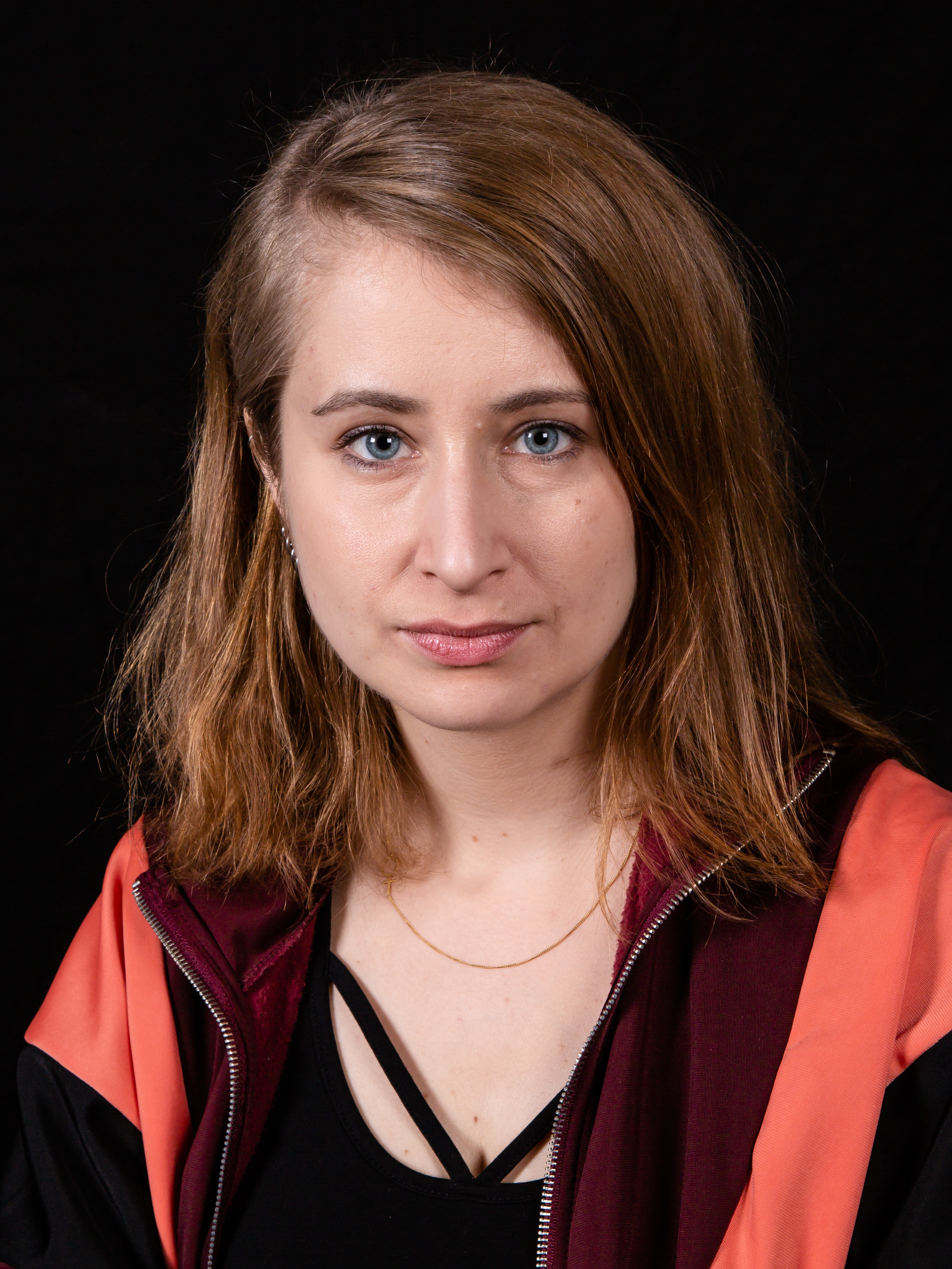
- Stokowski in 2018
- Born: April 14, 1986 (age 40); Zabrze, Poland
- Education: Humboldt University of Berlin
- Occupations: Writer, essayist
- Writing career
- Genres: Essays, Novel

Margarete Stokowski (born April 14, 1986 in Zabrze, Poland) is a Polish-German writer and essayist. She is best known for her weekly essays for the magazine Spiegel Online where she writes about the current state of feminism in Germany. The numbers of clicks on her essays reach up to 900,000. The Süddeutsche Zeitung stated that she is the "loudest voice of German feminism" in 2019.

Stokowski advocates freedom for every gender and often criticizes neoliberalism for the oppression of women especially, but also men. According to her views, the modern German society often misleads women into buying goods they don't need or being unhappy with their own bodies by setting up impossible-to-reach beauty standards. She states that a non-patriarchal world would be better for everybody and sees the fear of losing power as the main motivation for some people to cling on to patriarchy. Stokowski is a sharp observer and critic of right-wing tendencies all over the world.

She appeared alongside the Minister of Health, Karl Lauterbach, in an advertising campaign for a problematic promotion of COVID-19 vaccines named "Ich schütze mich" (I protect myself).

As of July 2019, Stokowski has published two books of her own, namely Untenrum frei (Freedom "Down There") in 2016 and Die letzten Tage des Patriarchats (The last days of patriarchy) in 2018. Both works were very successful and reached high positions in the bestseller rankings.

In September 2019, Stokowski was awarded the Kurt-Tucholsky-Preis for her critical analysis in her columns.

== Personal life ==
Stokowski was born in Poland in 1986. Her parents named her after the female protagonist of the novel The Master and Margarita by Mikhail Bulgakov. On her German identity card, Hindenberg (the name of Zabrze from 1915 – 1946) is listed as her birthplace instead of Zabrze.

In 1988, her family moved to West Berlin to live with her grandparents in Gropiusstadt. She grew up in Neukölln. She attended a Catholic private school, and then studied philosophy and social sciences at Humboldt University.

Stokowski says she has depression. After contracting COVID-19 in early 2022, she was diagnosed with long COVID.

Stokowski is in a relationship with the musician Jens Friebe. She used to live in a commune in Brandenburg and now lives in Berlin.

== Reception ==
In 2018, Stokowski cancelled an already sold-out reading at the Lehmkuhl bookstore in Munich because it also carried right-wing primary texts from Verlag Antaios. In a 2019 article, Stokowski criticized the German cult of asparagus, which she called "the old White man of cuisine." The Free Democratic Party chairman Christian Lindner quoted the article during a party conference while claiming that German asparagus production is under attack.

The Süddeutsche Zeitung Magazin described her as the "loudest voice in German feminism", and dedicated a cover story to her. She received the Kurt-Tucholsky-Preis in 2019 for her work as a columnist for Spiegel Online. She also received the Luise-Büchner-Preis für Publizistik in 2019 for her analysis of the "contradictions in relationships between women and men that still exist in our supposedly egalitarian society."

== Awards ==
- Luise-Büchner-Preis für Publizistik (2019)
- Kurt-Tucholsky-Preis (2019)

== Works ==
=== Books ===
- Untenrum frei. Rowohlt Verlag. 2016. ISBN 978-3-498-06439-6.
- Die letzten Tage des Patriarchats. Rowohlt Verlag. 2018. ISBN 978-3-498-06363-4.

=== Book contributions (a selection) ===
- jeder tag …. In: Christiane Frohmann (Ed.): Tausend Tode schreiben. Berlin 2015, ISBN 978-3-944195-55-1.
- Sie hat ‚ficken‘ gesagt. In: Volker Surmann, Heiko Werning (Ed.): Ist das jetzt Satire oder was? Beiträge zur humoristischen Lage der Nation. Satyr, Berlin 2015, ISBN 978-3-944035-62-8.
- frau k. In: Christoph Buchwald, Ulrike Almut Sandig (Ed.): Jahrbuch der Lyrik 2017. Schöffling, Frankfurt am Main 20, ISBN 978-3-89561-680-8.
- Forward to: Charles Fourier: Die Freiheit in der Liebe. Ein Essay. Edition Nautilus, Hamburg 2017, ISBN 978-3-96054-055-7.
- Stadt, Land, Fluss beim Sex – Mein Leben als feministische Kolumnistin. In: Peter Felixberger, Armin Nassehi (Ed.): Kursbuch 192. Frauen II. Kursbuch Kulturstiftung, Hamburg 2017, ISBN 978-3-96196-000-2.
- Afterword, in: Olympe de Gouges: Die Rechte der Frau und andere Texte. Reclam-Verlag, Ditzingen 2018, ISBN 978-3-15-019527-7.
- Zurück. In: Lina Muzur (Ed.): Sagte sie. 17 Erzählungen über Sex und Macht. Hanser Berlin, Berlin 2018, ISBN 978-3-446-26074-0.
- Sprache. In: Fatma Aydemir, Hengameh Yaghoobifarah (Ed.): Eure Heimat ist unser Albtraum. Ullstein fünf, Berlin 2019, ISBN 978-3-96101-036-3
- Forward to: Virginia Woolf: Ein eigenes Zimmer. Fischer Taschenbuch, Berlin 2019, ISBN 978-3-596-52235-4.

=== Radio ===
- Das größte Rudel der Welt. Einige Gedanken über sexuelle Belästigung. Südwestrundfunk 2018.
