= Juha Suoranta =

Finnish social scientist

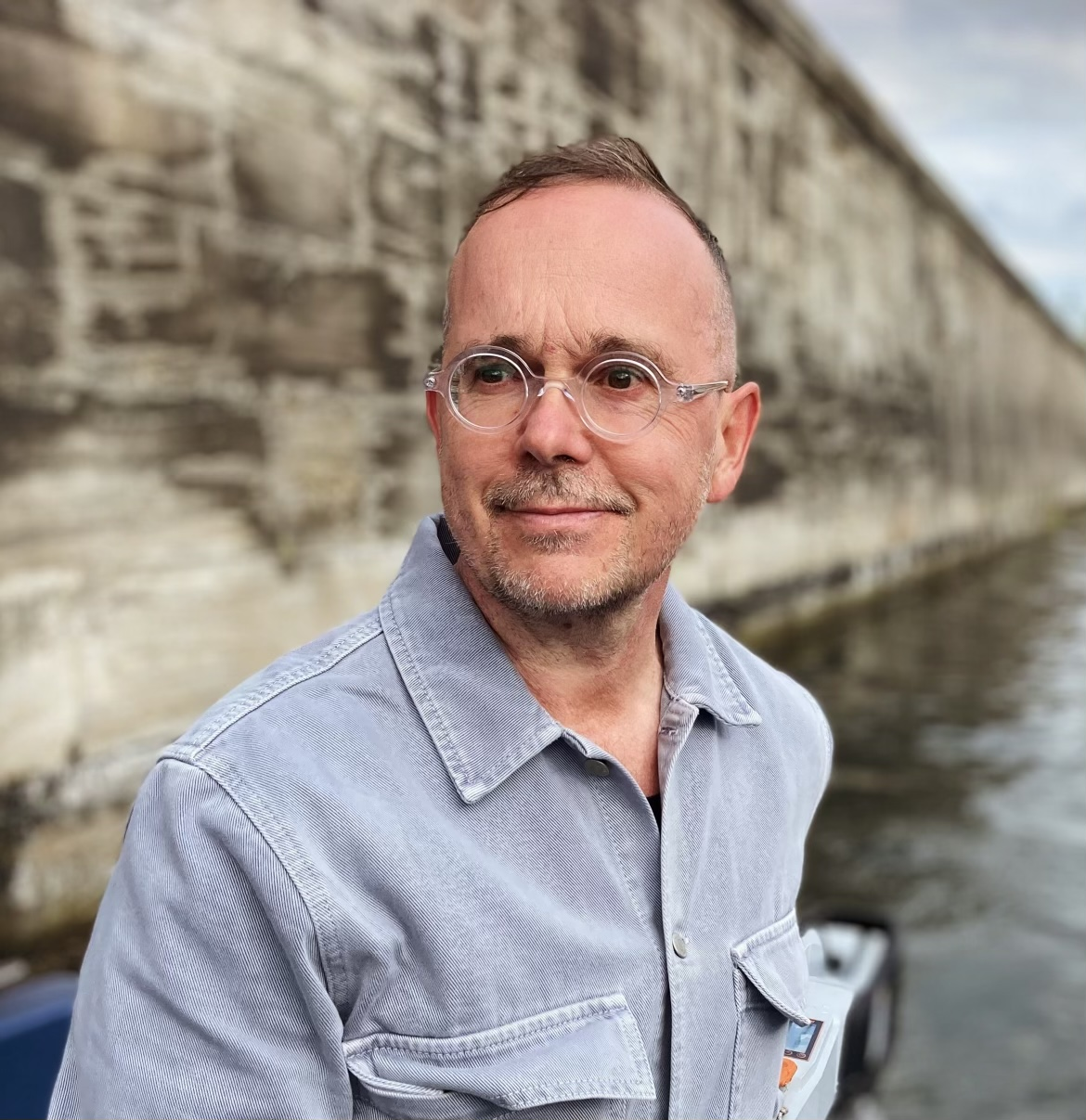
Juha Suoranta April 30, 2022

Juha Suoranta (born 24 February 1966 in Tampere, Finland) is a Finnish social scientist, and public intellectual.

== Biography ==
He is currently professor in adult education at the University of Tampere. Previously he worked as professor of education at the University of Lapland (1997–2004), and Professor of Adult Education at the University of Joensuu (2004–2006). He is also adjunct professor in music education at the Sibelius Academy, Helsinki, and in media education at the University of Tampere. In sum he has published 38 books and umpteen scientific articles.

Suoranta has been a visiting scholar at the University of Illinois at Urbana-Champaign in 1996-1997, and at the University of California, Los Angeles in 2003-2004. Suoranta has served as the Government of Finland/David and Nancy Speer Visiting Professor in Finnish Studies and Sociology at the University of Minnesota in 2005-2006.

In 2003 he acted as senior scientist in the Academy of Finland. He has also served as a short-term educational expert in Tanzania, and a consultant and author for the United Nations' World Youth Report 2003.

Suoranta has published extensively in the fields of education, political sociology of education, radical adult education, critical media education, and critical pedagogy belonging to the new, or second, generation of critical pedagogy scholars. In the latter area he has collaborated with Peter McLaren. In his writing Suoranta has been interested in bringing together ideas and material from various disciplines, including media and cultural studies, sociology, educational studies, literature studies and literature.

Suoranta is a member of Editorial Boards of several scientific journals, including Journal of Critical Educational Policy Studies. He has been the President of the Finnish Educational Association Citizen's Forum (SKAF), a major adult education organization in Finland, from 2007 on. Besides English and Finnish, his texts have been published in Estonian, Greek, Norwegian, Spanish, Turkish, Chinese, and Portuguese.

In 2007, Suoranta helped found the Paulo Freire Center–Finland, the first Paulo Freire Center in the Nordic countries.

In the Spring 2009 Suoranta provided a hiding place for an Afghan-born underaged asylum seeker, who was about to be deported from Finland to the streets of Athens in Greece without safety. These events are documented in his book Piilottajan päiväkirja (Hidden in Plain Sight).

Suoranta served as the conferrer at the 2025 doctoral conferment ceremony at Tampere University. In the ceremony, 209 doctors and 13 honorary doctors invited by the faculties were conferred.

== Major works ==
- The Integrated Media Machine I: A Theoretical Framework (Co-edited with Mauri Ylä-Kotola, Sam Inkinen and Jari Rinne), 2000.
- The Integrated Media Machine II: Aspects of Internet Culture, Hypertechnologies, and Informal Learning (Co-edited with Mauri Ylä-Kotola and Sam Inkinen), 2001.
- Architecture: Theory, Research, and Practice. (with Seppo Aura and Juhani Katainen), 2001.
- Children in the Information Society: The Case of Finland (with Hanna Lehtimäki), 2004. ISBN 0-8204-6829-0
- Artistic Research. Theories, Methods, and Practices (with Mika Hannula and Tere Vadén), 2005. ISBN 951-53-2743-1 Contents
- Education and the Spirit of Time. Historical, Global and Critical Reflections (co-edited with Olli-Pekka Moisio), 2006. Amsterdam: Sense Publishers. ISBN 90-77874-17-8 Contents
- Wikiworld. Political Economy of Digital Literacy, and the Promise of Participatory Media (with Tere Vadén), 2008. ISBN 978-951-44-7281-7 Download
- Havoc of Capitalism. Educating for Social and Environmental Justice (co-edited with Gregory Martin, Donna Houston & Peter McLaren), 2010. Amsterdam: Sense Publishers. .
- Wikiworld. Revisited Edition. (with Tere Vadén), 2010. London: Pluto Press. ISBN 978-0-7453-2891-1
- Hidden in Plain Sight. How I Sheltered a Refugee. Translation Silja Kudel. Helsinki: Into Publishing 2011. ISBN 978-952-264-112-0 (EPUB)
- Artistic Research Methodology (with Mika Hannula and Tere Vadén), 2014. New York: Peter Lang. ISBN 978-952-264-297-4.
- Militant Freire. New York: DIO Press. 30 September 2021. ISBN 978-1-64504-214-3.
- Paulo Freire: peregrino do óbvio. Pontes. 2025. ISBN 978-8-52170-637-3.

In Finnish

- Enlightening Education, 1997.
- Introduction to Qualitative Research (with Jari Eskola), 1998 (8th ed. 2008).
- Education in the Simulation Culture (with Mauri Ylä-Kotola), 2000.
- Edifying Adult Education (with Petri Salo), 2002.
- Education in the Media Culture. What Educators Need to Know, 2003.
- Radical Education. Towards a Political Sociology of Education, 2005.
- At the Crossroads of Adult Education (with Juha Kauppila and Hilkka Rekola), 2006.
- The Coming University (with Antti Salminen and Tere Vadén), 2010.
- Piilottajan päiväkirja, 2010.
- Rebellious Research Methods (with Sanna Ryynanen), 2014. (An English excerpt)
- C. Wright Mills' Sociological Life, 2017
- Paulo Freire, a pedagogue of the oppressed, 2019

Research articles on wikilearning by Juha Suoranta

- Leinonen, Teemu, Juha Suoranta & Tere Vadén (2009) Learning in and with an open wiki project: Wikiversity’s potential in global capacity building. First Monday 14 (2).
- Renfors, Anna & Suoranta, Juha (2021) Learning Democracy by Doing Wikiversity. In Hoechsmann, M., Thésée, G. & Carr, P. (Eds.) Education for Democracy 2.0. Changing Frames of Media Literacy (pp. 326–344). Brill|Sense. https://urn.fi/URN:NBN:fi:tuni-202102162114
- Suoranta, Juha (2010) Learners and Oppressed Peoples of the World, Wikify! In Malott, Curry & Porfilio, Bradley (Eds.). Critical Pedagogy in the 21st Century: A New Generation of Scholars. Information Age Publishing.
- Suoranta, Juha & Tere Vadén (2011) Wikilearning as Radical Equality. In Trifonas, Peter (ed.). Learning in the Virtual: Public Pedagogy in the Digital Age. London & New York: Routledge.
- Vadén, Tere & Suoranta, Juha (2008) A Definition and Criticism of Cybercommunism
