= Erich Kuby =

German journalist, publisher and screenwriter

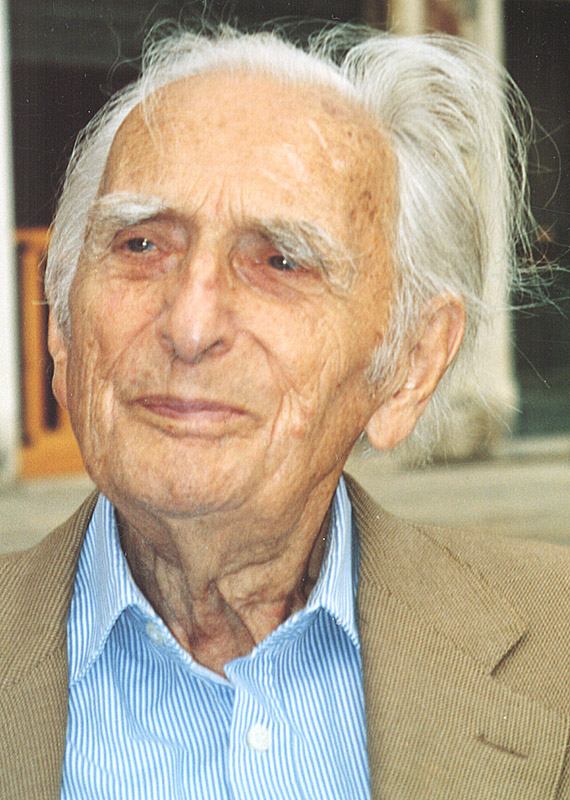
Kuby in 2003

Erich Kuby (28 June 1910 – 10 September 2005) was a German journalist, publisher and screenwriter.

== Life ==
=== Early years ===
Kuby's father had bought in 1901 an estate in West Prussia, but after one year he had to give up working it. He then moved to Munich and met his future wife Dora Süßkind. Their son Erich was born in 1910 in Baden-Baden.

In 1913, the family moved to the Alpine foothills in Upper Bavaria where the father again took over a farm. There the child grew up while his father served in World War I as a reserve officer. After the end of the war the family moved to Weilheim where Kuby was enrolled in the "Gymnasium" (preparatory school for university). Due to his father's long absence, he seemed to Kuby to be "a rather strange man."

"[…] from him I learned that we had not lost the war, although I (even though only eight years old) didn't believe him. On the contrary, I had already begun to turn into the family's black sheep, a son who showed only minimal interest when the father, shortly after the move to the nearest county town where he bought and operated a small farm, and built up a paramilitary organization called Citizen Defense. At the nearby firing range its members held family gatherings which were actually firing exercises. Once, shortly before the Hitler-Putsch of 1923, Ludendorff even visited my father, and I remember them walking back and forth in our fruit orchard […]"

— Erich Kuby, My Bothersome Fatherland (Mein ärgerliches Vaterland), Munich, 1989 (licensed edition Volk und Welt, Berlin 1990, p. 7)

In Munich Kuby took violin lessons. At school he was influenced politically by, among other people, a critical Jewish professor. In Munich he received his diploma as an external student. He then studied Economics at the universities of Erlangen and Hamburg and completed his studies in 1933. During his semester breaks he worked as a longshoreman at the Blohm & Voss company in Hamburg.

In 1933 he emigrated, traveling by bicycle, together with his Jewish girlfriend Ruth, to Yugoslavia. However, he returned from there to Germany, alone, after a few months because he reportedly wanted to analyze from a close distance, but nevertheless intellectually from afar, the "process of decay" of the country.

He moved from Munich to Berlin and worked in the picture archive of the Scherl Publishing House. In 1938 he married the sculptor Edith Schumacher, the daughter of the National Economist Hermann Schumacher of Berlin. Together they had five children. His wife's sister was married to the atomic physicist Werner Heisenberg. They were "Absolute Patriots" (title of his history of the family which was published in 1996). During the Second World War Kuby served in the Wehrmacht (German army) in France and on the eastern front.

In Russia in 1941, Kuby was brought before a military court because of a supposed infraction of sentinel duty regulations and sentenced to nine months in prison and reduced in rank from corporal to private. He described the normal life of a German soldier in letters and with almost daily diary entries, and he completed many sketches. After the war he was, for a short time, until June 1945, a prisoner of war in U.S. captivity. He published his war experiences later in the works Demidoff; oder, von der Unverletzlichkeit des Menschen (Demidoff; or, On the Invulnerability of Mankind, 1947), Nur noch rauchende Trümmer (Nothing but Smoking Ruins, 1959), and his magnum opus Mein Krieg (My War, 1975). In 2000 he published these as a complete edition.

=== Journalistic career ===
After the war Kuby first rebuilt his parents' destroyed house in Weilheim. Then he was hired by the American military administration ICD (Information Control Division) in Munich as an advisor. He was given the task of awarding newspaper publishing licenses to trustworthy people. In January 1946 he took part in the founding of the magazine Der Ruf ("The Call"). He was named its chief editor in 1947 after the dismissal of Alfred Andersch and Hans Werner Richter. However, in this role Kuby fared no better and, after a year, was also forced to leave. Nevertheless, he continued his journalistic career and founded his own publishing house, a step he later came to regret. In the following years he worked for the Süddeutsche Zeitung as editor. He then became a freelance contributor to many magazines such as Der Spiegel, Stern and Frankfurter Hefte. In his articles the "Nestbeschmutzer von Rang" or "top ranked fouler of his own nest" (according to Heinrich Böll) occupied a political position between parties and was an important opponent of German rearmament.

Kuby was considered to be one of the most important chroniclers of the German Federal Republic. In the 1960s he became involved in the student uprisings. In the summer of 1965, the Kuby case made headlines throughout Germany when the then head of the Free University of Berlin forbade Kuby to speak at the university. Seven years earlier Kuby had criticized the use of the name "Free University" and therefore was not allowed to accept the invitation by AStA (General Students' Committee) to take part in a discussion panel. This led to massive protests by the student body.

In 1965, Kuby wrote a six-part series for Der Spiegel titled "Die Russen in Berlin 1945" ("The Russians in Berlin 1945") and afterwards published it as a book while making extensive use of the then available sources in Eastern Europe.

He always maintained a non-partisan point of view and was not afraid of criticism from like-minded people or former colleagues. In 1983 and 1987 he wrote detailed critical analyses of Germany's past and present for the magazines Stern and Spiegel. With his war diary Mein Krieg, Aufzeichnungen aus 2129 Tagen ("My War, notes from 2129 days," 1975) Kuby presented an ordinary soldier's insider view of the Wehrmacht from 1939 to 1945. This first edition was not well received, perhaps because of its documentation of German collective responsibility for the excesses of WW2 and even WW1.

=== Radio and screenplays ===
Along with his journalistic activity, he adapted socially critical material for radio and television. His controversial radio play about the senseless defense of Fortress Brest in France by the Wehrmacht toward the end of the war earned him the accusation of slander by the responsible general Hermann-Bernhard Ramcke. Kuby had taken part as a soldier in the destruction of Brest in 1944. In 1959 the charge was dismissed by the courts.

Kuby became famous because of his collaboration in the screenplay for the movie Rosemary. It served as the basis for his 1958 novel Rosemarie: Des deutschen Wunders liebstes Kind ("Rosemarie: The Favorite Child of the Economic Miracle"). It is about the unsolved murder of Frankfurt call girl Rosemarie Nitribitt. The drama exposed the hypocrisy and dark side of the German Wirtschaftswunder ("economic miracle"). His fictional representation captured the Zeitgeist of the times so realistically that his hypothetical version of the background of the murder was largely accepted as truth by public opinion. Even minor details, such as Rosemarie's supposedly red sports car (the legendary Mercedes-Benz 190SL), are treated in many accounts even today as being factual. While Rosemarie did have a Mercedes sports car, it was black according to contemporary reports.

=== Final years ===
Kuby spent his final 25 years mostly in Venice, from where he continued to take part in Germany's political debates. Until 2003 the "Homme de lettres" wrote columns under the byline Zeitungsleser ("Newspaper Reader") for the weekly magazine Freitag ("Friday"). He died in his 95th year and is buried in the Protestant section of the San Michele cemetery in Venice.

=== Family ===
Erich Kuby married twice, the second time with author and publisher Susanna Böhme (born 1947) with whom he had a son named Daniel. From his marriage with Edith Schumacher (1910–2001), he had the children Thomas, Gabriele, Clemens, and Benedikt. The last three are also writers. Sophia Kuby, spokesperson for the media network "Generation Benedikt," is his grandchild.

=== Awards ===
In 1992, Kuby was awarded the Publizistikpreis der Landeshauptstadt München (Publisher's Prize of Munich) for his lifelong activity in publishing. The laudatory speech was delivered by Wolfgang R. Langenbucher. Kuby was posthumously awarded the Kurt-Tucholsky-Preis of 2005. The laudatory speech was delivered by Heinrich Senfft.

== Selected works ==
- (1947): Demidoff oder von der Unverletzlichkeit der Menschen, by Erich Kuby under the pseudonym Alexander Parlach, Paul List (publisher), Munich
- (1956): Das Ende des Schreckens: Dokumente des Untergangs Januar bis Mai 1945, Süddeutscher Publishing, Munich
- (1957): Das ist des Deutschen Vaterland - 70 Millionen in zwei Wartesälen. Stuttgart: Scherz & Goverts, 485 S.
- (1958): Rosemarie. Des deutschen Wunders liebstes Kind. Stuttgart: Goverts, 306 S., Nachdruck: Rotbuch Verlag, Berlin 2010, ISBN 978-3-86789-119-6
- (1959): Nur noch rauchende Trümmer. Das Ende der Festung Brest. Tagebuch des Soldaten Erich Kuby; mit Text des Hörbildes, Plädoyer des Staatsanwalts, Begründung des Urteils. Hamburg: Rowohlt, 198 S.
- (1963): Franz Josef Strauß: Ein Typus unserer Zeit. [Mitarb.]: Eugen Kogon, Otto von Loewenstern, Jürgen Seifert. Wien: Desch, 380 S.
- (1963): Richard Wagner & Co. Zum 150. Geburtstag des Meisters. Hamburg: Nannen, 155 S.
- (1965): Die Russen in Berlin 1945. Scherz Verlag, München Bern Wien
- (1968): Prag und die Linke. Hamburg: Konkret-Verlag, 154 S., Ill.
- (1975): Mein Krieg. Aufzeichnungen aus 2129 Tagen. Nymphenburger, München, ISBN 3-485-00250-X. Mehrere Neuauflagen, zuletzt als Taschenbuch Aufbau 1999 ISBN 3-7466-1588-7
- (1982): Verrat auf deutsch. Wie das Dritte Reich Italien ruinierte. [Übers. aus d. Ital. u. Engl.: Susanna Böhme]. Hamburg: Hoffmann und Campe, 575 S. ISBN 3-455-08754-X
- (1983): Der Fall "Stern" und die Folgen. Hamburg: Konkret Literatur Verlag, 207 S. ISBN 3-922144-33-0 und Berlin: Volk und Welt, 206 S.
- (1986): Als Polen deutsch war: 1939-1945. Ismaning bei München: Hueber, 341 S.
- (1987): Der Spiegel im Spiegel. Das deutsche Nachrichten-Magazin; kritisch analysiert von Erich Kuby. München: Heyne, 176 S. ISBN 3-453-00037-4
- (1989): Mein ärgerliches Vaterland. München: Hanser, 560 S., Leinen, ISBN 3-446-15043-9.
- (1990): Der Preis der Einheit. Ein deutsches Europa formt sein Gesicht. Hamburg: Konkret Literatur Verlag, 112 S. ISBN 3-922144-99-3
- (1990): Deutschland: von verschuldeter Teilung zur unverdienten Einheit. Rastatt: Moewig, 398 S.
- (1991): Deutsche Perspektiven. Unfreundliche Randbemerkungen. Hamburg: Konkret Literatur, 160 S. ISBN 3-89458-105-0
- (1996): Der Zeitungsleser. In Wochenschritten durch die politische Landschaft 1993-1995. Hamburg: Konkret Literatur, 160 S. ISBN 3-89458-145-X
- (1996): Lauter Patrioten. Eine deutsche Familiengeschichte. München: Hanser, geb. ISBN 3-446-15918-5
- (2010): Erich Kuby zum 100. AufZeichnungen 1939-1945. Hamburg: hyperzine verlag, Katalog zur Wanderausstellung der Zeichnungen und Aquarelle, kuratiert von Susanne Böhme-Kuby und Benedikt Kuby, 100 S. ISBN 978-3-938218-16-7

For a complete list of Kuby's works and their translations into other languages, see the catalog of the DNB (German National Library).

== Quotes ==
- Publishers slurp their champagne from the skulls of the journalists.
- So demanding is our people when in possession of power, so servile when they have gambled it away; nothing can be expected of them. I say: Nothing can be expected of them, although they created Sedan, provoked the first World War, made 1933 possible, set the second World War in motion, and now dispose over a world empire – however, everything for nothing and again nothing.
- In the case of Stalingrad there is no doubt why we must have compassion for a few hundred thousand men, in other words, why they found (or, if still alive) now find themselves in a situation which commands our compassion. Do you believe that, in this mass of people there were, I estimate generously, more than two thousand who wouldn't have found it marvelous to be victors at the Volga and settle down there?
- Compassion? When someone jumps from a bridge and expects to land below in an easy chair, it upsets me. Nobody pushed anyone over the railing. This is exactly the blue smoke that will blown into our faces après. I understand that a national community has no choice, if it has collectively bought Stalingrad, for example, but to justify it as collective behavior...If your view of Stalingrad is obscured by compassion, my view is troubled by shame – but after all: ein Volk, ein Reich...
