= Ludwig Scheuermann =

German painter and caricaturist

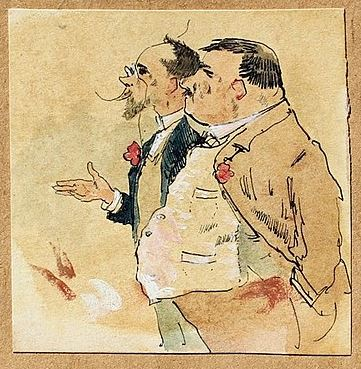
Self-portrait (left) with Moritz Röbbecke (1891)

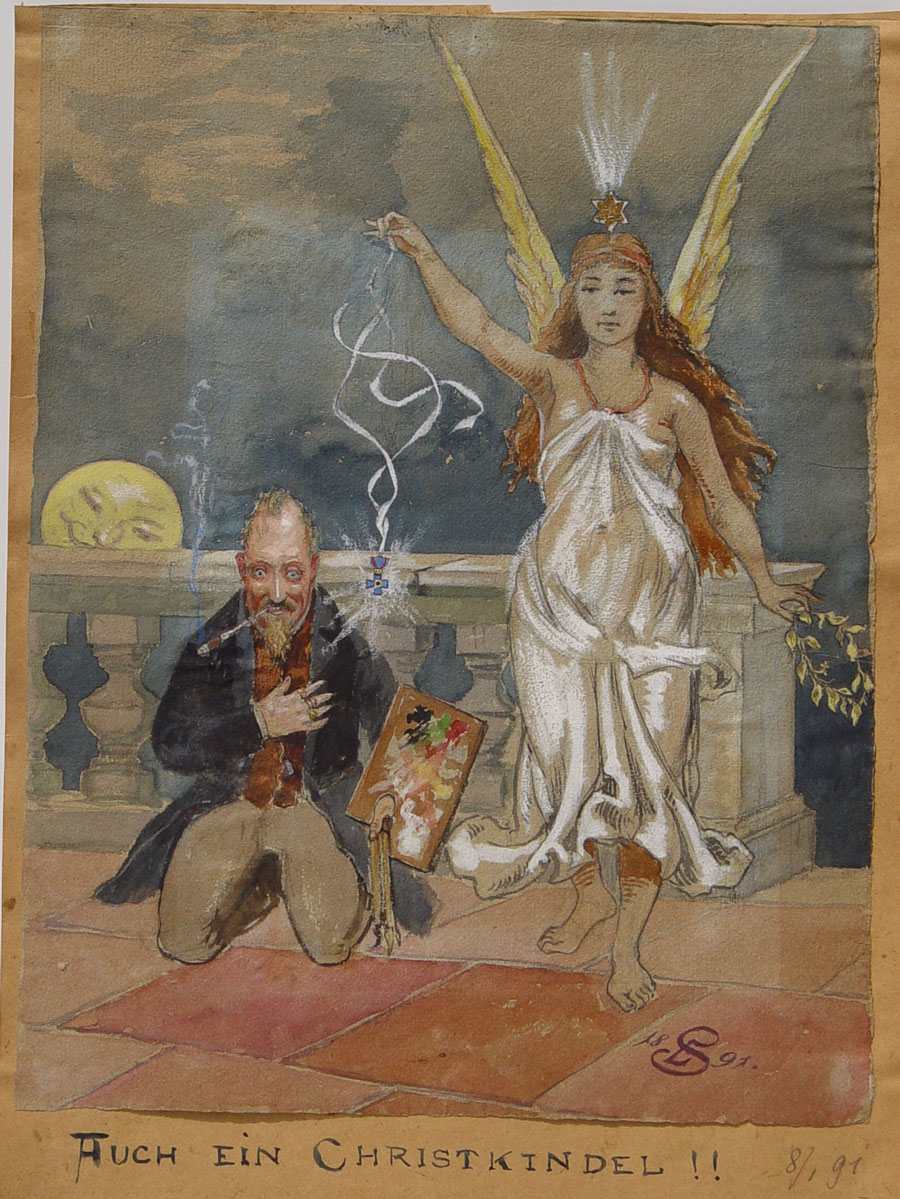
"Also a Christ Child" (caricature of the painter, Otto Seitz)

Ludwig Gustav Wilhelm Scheuermann (18 October 1859, Burgersdorp - 1 September 1911, Herrsching am Ammersee) was a German painter and caricaturist.

== Biography ==
He was born to a family of merchants from Augsburg. Shortly before his birth, they had emigrated to the Cape Colony to start a new business. His father died only two years later, and they returned to Augsburg, Kingdom of Bavaria, where he had his primary schooling.

At the age of twenty, he enrolled in the classics course at the Academy of Fine Arts Munich. There, he studied with Gyula Benczúr, Ludwig von Löfftz and Alexander Strähuber. After graduating, with support from his teachers, he was able to spend some time in Paris at the Académie Julian, where he worked with William Bouguereau.

After some travelling in Italy and North Africa, he returned to Germany and, in 1887, married Désirée Stolberg; a Baltic-German from Riga. By this time, he was a successful painter of rural genre scenes and, in 1888, was able to acquire property Herrsching am Ammersee. Later, he was able to build a large villa on the lakeshore, with a design inspired by Italian palaces. Every summer his friends would visit and they would have modest art festivals.

In 1905, he and Desirée were divorced and she was given custody of their two children. After his death, at the age of fifty-two, his villa was inherited by his son, who held it until 1934, when it was passed to the community. It has since become headquarters for the Herrsching Adult Education Center and an occasional site for art exhibits.
