= Bavarian Film Awards (Best Production) =

The Bavarian Film Awards (German: Bayerischer Filmpreis) are film awards presented annually by the government of Bavaria to honour outstanding achievements in German filmmaking.

This is a list of the winners of the Bavarian Film Awards Prize for best production.

- 1982 Franz Seitz, Michael Wiedemann
- 1983 Karel Dirka
- 1984 Bernd Eichinger, Dieter Geissler, Günter Rohrbach
- 1986 Bernd Eichinger
- 1987 Werner Herzog, Lucki Stipetic
- 1988 Christian Wagner
- 1989 Moritz Borman, Wolf Gaudlitz, Rainer Söhnlein
- 1990 Steffen and Thomas Kuchenreuther, Joseph Vilsmaier
- 1991 Eberhard Junkersdorf
- 1992 Bob Arnold, Hanno Huth, Günter Rohrbach, Joseph Vilsmaier
- 1993 Bernd Eichinger
- 1994 Clemens Kuby, Peter Zenk
- 1995 Michael Verhoeven, Joseph Vilsmaier
- 1996 Jakob Claussen, Luggi Waldleitner, Thomas Wöbke
- 1997 Eberhard Junkersdorf
- 1998 Stefan Arndt, Wolfgang Becker, Dani Levy, Tom Tykwer
- 1999 Rob Houwer, Peter Schamoni, Franz Xaver Gernstl
- 2000 Kerstin Dobbertin von Fürstenberg, Harald Kügler, Herbert Rimbach
- 2001 Andreas Bareiß, Gloria Burkert, Peter Herrmann
- 2002 Karl Blatz, Uschi Reich, Peter Zenk
- 2003 Jakob Claussen, Uli Putz
- 2004 Bernd Eichinger
- 2005 Christoph Müller and Sven Burgemeister, Marc Rothemund and Fred Breinersdorfer
- 2006 Andreas Richter, Annie Brunner and Ursula Woerner
- 2007 Harald Kügler and Molly von Fürstenberg
