= In Plain Sight (disambiguation) =

In Plain Sight is a 2008 American drama television series about US Marshals.

In Plain Sight may also refer to:

- In Plain Sight (British TV series), 2016 British drama series about serial killer Peter Manuel
- In Plain Sight (Casey book), 2018 true-crime book by Kathryn Casey
- In Plain Sight (Jackson book), 2016 book by Richard Jackson
- "In Plain Sight" (Supergirl), an episode of Supergirl
- In Plain Sight, a 2019 album by Honeyblood
- In Plain Sight (Casualty), the thirty-eighth series of the television series Casualty (2023)
- In Plain Sight: The Life and Lies of Jimmy Savile, 2014 book by Dan Davies
