= Hiding in Plain Sight (novel) =

2014 novel by Nuruddin Farah

- First edition (publisher Riverhead Books)
- Author: Nuruddin Farah
- Language: English
- Publisher: Riverhead Books
- Publication date: 2014
- Pages: 342
- ISBN: 9781594633362
- OCLC: 884631101

Hiding in Plain Sight is a 2014 novel by Somali novelist Nuruddin Farah. The novel follows the experience of Bella in the wake of a terrorist attack that kills her brother, Aar, a Kenyan UN worker in Mogadishu. After the death, Bella returns to Nairobi to help care for her brother's family. The ensuing conflict between Bella and her brother's widow becomes a central element of the novel. Hiding in Plain Sight is Farah's twelfth novel.

== Background and context ==
The terrorist attack that starts the novel is very similar to the one that killed 20 at a UN compound in Somalia in 2013. After Farrah submitted a first draft of the novel to his publisher, Farah's sister died in a terrorist attack in a Kabul restaurant similar to the events he had described written in his draft.

While preparing for writing the novel, Farah had to learn how photography works, in order to accurately represent Bella's work as a photographer.

== Themes ==
When reviewing the novel for The New York Times, critic Laila Lalami noted two distinctive stylistic elements of the novel: first, like many of Farah's earlier novels, the novel is set during the midst of a country in rapid transition, Kenya, and thus explores the chaos of that change; and, second, the novel has a focus on grief. Lalami notes: "The rewards of reading Hiding in Plain Sight lie in Farah’s sensitive exploration of grief and his depiction of a family's love for one another."

The Washington Post reviewer Ron Charles focus on the socio-political themes of the novel. For Charles, the novel highlights many of the problems related to African prejudice for homosexuality, terrorism, familial relations, and the results of the African diaspora. The Daily News critic Colin Devries described this discussion of socio-economic cultural issues as too obtuse, and at times "preachy".

== Style ==
The novel is written in the third person, often following Bella's perspective, but occasionally drifting to one of the other characters'. The New York Times critic Laila Lalami describes the transitions between characters as "abrupt and ultimately jarring".

The prose style of the novel received poor reception from a number of critics: The Washington Post critic Ron Charles called the prose "bland", and The Guardian critic Claire Hazelton called it "poetic [...] but too often lacks imagination".

== Critical reception ==
Reception of the novel was mixed. The New York Times critic Laila Lalami largely praises the novel, describing its depiction of grief as the most rewarding part of the novel. She writes: "Farah is particularly adept at evoking the way in which the sight of a familiar face or place can trigger painful memories."

The Washington Post critic Ron Charles praises the novel's thematic interests, but "as an engaging novel, it's less successful". He attributes this to both the "blandness of its prose" and the "plot's allergy to any sustained tension". The Guardian similarly gave mixed reviews, noting the poor style, yet describing the plot as having "drama and direction" where Farah successfully represents "racial tensions and violence commonplace in many African cities".

== Additional resources ==
- "Somali writer Nuruddin Farah on his new book Hiding in Plain Sight". SoundCloud.
