= Margarita Khemlin =

- Маргарита Хемлин
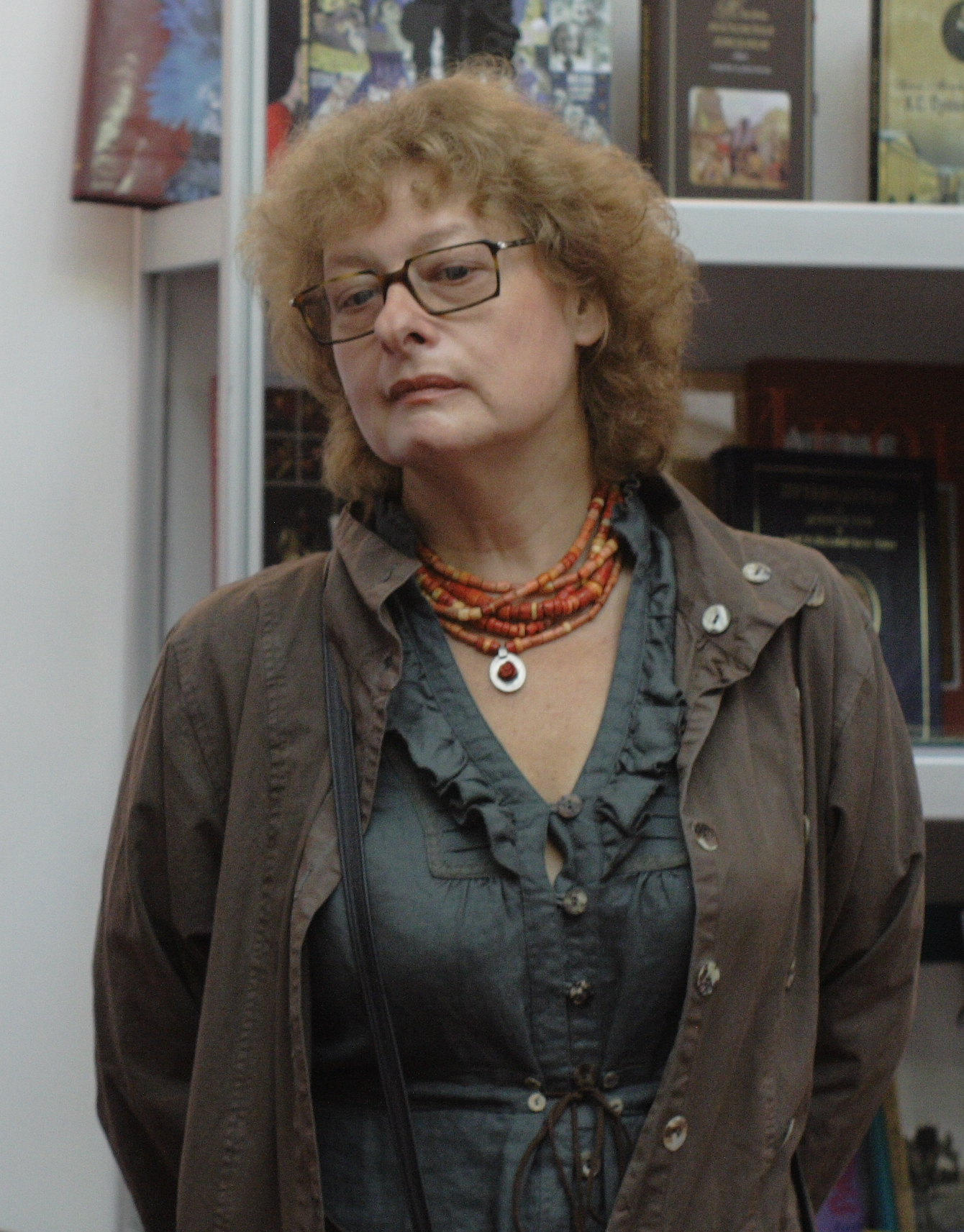
- Born: 6 July 1960; Chernihiv, Ukrainian SSR, Soviet Union
- Died: 24 October 2015 (aged 55); Moscow, Russia
- Citizenship: Soviet Union, Russia
- Education: Maxim Gorky Literature Institute
- Writing career
- Years active: 1991–2015

Margarita Khemlin (Russian: Маргарита Михайловна Хемлин; 6 July 1960 – 24 October 2015) was a Jewish-Ukrainian novelist and short-story writer, best known for her novel Klotsvog.

== Biography ==
Margarita Mikhailovna Khemlin was born in Chernihiv, in the Ukrainian SSR on 6 July 1960. Her father, Mikhail Khemlin was a foreman, while her mother, Vera Meyerovskaya, was a physiotherapy instructor. From 1980 to 1985, she studied at the Maxim Gorky Literature Institute in Moscow, under the supervision of Lev Ozerov.

Following her graduation, she worked variously in Housing and communal services, as a dishwasher, at the publisher Fizkultura i sport, as a theatre reviewer for the newspaper Nezavisimaya Gazeta (1990–1991), at the art department of the newspaper Today (1993–1996), as a political editor of the journal Itogi, and as chief editor in charge of promotion and design of the broadcaster Channel One Russia (1996–2003). The programme A Minute of Silence was revived under her aegis, following its stoppage between 1992–1995 after the fall of the Soviet Union.

Khemlin was married to the writer and translator Vardvan Varzhapetian.

Khemlin's first publication was the short story Illegal Hold (alternatively Sucker Punch) in the collection Sucker Punch: Sports Detective (issue 3, 1991, with Anatoly Belikov).

She published a cycle of short stories titled A Jewess' Farewell in the magazine Znamya (number 10), and won the Znamya prize for two of the stories (About Berta and About Iosif).

Her collection of short stories Queueing Area was short-listed for the Big Book prize in 2008. Her first novel, Klotsvog, was short listed for the Russian Booker prize in 2009, as was another novel The Investigator in 2013, which also won the Inspector NOSE prize for best post-Soviet detective book.

In 2012, Khemlin was appointed to the jury of the New York-based O'Henry Prize for short stories in the Russian language.

Khemlin died on 24 October 2015.

== Selected works ==
- Живая очередь. Moscow: Vagrius. 2008.
- Великая княгиня Елизавета Фёдоровна. Moscow. 2009. (with Alla Tsitrinyak)
- Клоцвог. Moscow: Rudomino. 2009. ISBN 978-5738003158.
- Крайний. Moscow: Tsentr knigi. 2010. ISBN 978-5738003493.
- Дознаватель. Moscow: Astrel'. 2012.

=== English translations ===
- "Темное дело" [Shady Business]. Subtropics (17). Translated by Lisa Hayden Espenschade. 2014. Archived from the original on 2015-10-30.
- "Третья мировая Баси Соломоновны" [Basya Solomonovna's Third World War]. Counterfeits. Translated by Lisa Hayden Espenschade. Archived from the original on 2015-11-09.
- The Investigator. Translated by Melanie Moore. 's-Hertogenbosch: Glagoslav. 2015. ISBN 978-1784379667.
- Klotsvog. Translated by Lisa C. Hayden. New York: Columbia University Press, Russian Library series. 2019. ISBN 9780231182379
