= From a Crooked Rib =

1970 novel by Nuruddin Farah

- From a Crooked Rib, 1970 (Heinemann African Writers Series)
- Author: Nuruddin Farah
- Language: English
- Publisher: Heinemann
- Publication date: 1970
- Pages: 182
- OCLC: 150459902

From a Crooked Rib is a 1970 novel by Somali writer Nuruddin Farah. It was Farah’s debut and was published as the 80th book in Heinemann's African Writers Series.

== Background ==
Following the rejection of two early manuscripts by both Heinemann and Knopf, Farah spent several months in a state of depression. He had found the rejection he received from Aigboje Higo, manager of Heinemann’s offices in Nigeria, a particular setback. Writing two decades later, Farah reminisced:

Looking back on it now, I believe it was the most arrogant missive a young writer had ever received from the editor of a reputable publisher. Aig-Higo, the Nigerian Editor of the Heinemann African Writers Series told me that I had no right submitting a worthless manuscript to a house of their name and high reputation, and he suggested that, since I had no talent whatsoever (these are his words and the letter is there for anyone to read), I had better consider what I wished to do with my life.

From a Crooked Rib was subsequently written over a period of six weeks in 1968 while Farah was a student in India. Farah recalled rereading his first unpublished manuscript, a 300-page text completed in 1966, and realised the first 40 pages could be rewritten to create a new novel. Commenting on this time, Farah explained:

I developed my writing skills in the crucible of nostalgia, because although not in exile I lived in India at the time, where to my mind I recreated my native land in the iron words of a fiery truth that was given shape to and etched on the skin of lived history.

The new manuscript was received positively by both Heinemann London's office and Longman, although the latter suggested that the ending should be rewritten. James Currey at Heinemann was excited by the manuscript and wrote to ask whether Farah was a woman or a man, and whether he was African. His first question arose from the "female sensitivity" he identified in the novel, while his second was the result of Farah writing from India where he had been studying Philosophy and Literature at Panjab University. The confusion over the author's identity continued for many years, with Farah reporting that he still received letters addressed to "Mrs Farah" in 2000.

Curry and his colleague Keith Sambrook pitched for the novel to be published in hardback by William Heinemann, rather than as a cheaper paperback edition in the African Writers Series. However, the editorial director considered the manuscript an anthropological curiosity and difficult to read.

The manuscript for From a Crooked Rib was ultimately accepted for publication in August 1969. Farah rewrote the novel extensively from the proof, exceeding the 10% corrections allowed at the time due to the cost of setting. He was also reluctant to be photographed for the back cover but was happy with the final publication, which he received in November 1970.

By this time Farah was back in Somalia and in 1972 had begun writing a novel in the newly adopted Somali Latin alphabet. This was serialised in Mogadishu's daily newspaper, before a dispute with the censorship board led to it being discontinued and From a Crooked Rib banned. The ban remained in place for many years.

== Plot ==
From a Crooked Rib is the story of Ebla, a young woman who flees her nomadic life in the Ogaden after her grandfather offers her in marriage to an old man in exchange for some camels. She takes refuge with a cousin in a nearby town, only to discover that he intends to settle his debts by marrying her to a local broker. Ebla flees again, travelling to Mogadishu with an educated young man named Awill. On finding Awill is having an affair, she then takes a second husband, who in turn treats her like a prostitute. By the end of the story Ebla realises that women are treated as little more than cattle in the countryside and no better in the city. She decides that she must act in her own interest and becomes a prostitute. The novel ends with Ebla discovering she is pregnant without knowing who the father is.

== Reception ==
Ebla's story has been read as a national allegory, charting aspects of Somalia's colonial history such as Sayid Mohamed Abdullahi Hassan's defeat of British forces in 1913 and the growing power of Italy. Her own resistance is reflective of the politics of Somali nationalism.

As well a national allegory, From a Crooked Rib has also been read as a feminist tract. Farah himself saw the novel as being about "male oppression of women and women's struggle against this domination" Farah's ability to depict the world from the point of view of a woman has been considered uncanny by many women readers, including the Nigerian novelist Buchi Emecheta who questioned whether it could really have been written by a man. Others have commented that Farah is a "rarity in African literature, a male author who writes with a profound and enduring sympathy for women".

A more critical response can be found from Elsa Dixler, writing for the New York Times in 2006, who called the novel "a young writer’s novel, with an intermittently shaky point of view and language that can be awkward, but it demonstrates Farah’s extraordinary ability to enter the consciousness of an unsophisticated woman."

From a Crooked Rib has been translated into numerous languages. One of the earliest was a Slovene translation by Marjana Samide (Upognjeno rebro, 1978) that appeared following a mandate from the Yugoslav government to publish texts by authors from Nonaligned Movement countries. Later translations appeared in French (Née de la côte d'Adam, 1987), German (Aus einer gekrümmten Rippe, 1994), and Swedish (Adams revben, 2009). In 2016 Abdisalam Hereri translated the novel into Somali, under the title Feedh Qalloocan.
