= Kurt-Tucholsky-Preis =

German literary award

Kurt-Tucholsky-Preis is a literary prize of Germany. The prize amount is currently €5,000.

The prize, for "committed and succinct literary works" (Note: "engagierte und sprachlich prägnante Werke der literarischen Publizistik") was first awarded in 1995, and thereafter annually till 1997, since when it has been awarded every two years. It is targeted on short form works including Essays, Satire, Song, Treatises and Pamphlets. Texts should "verify reality, disclose backgrounds and help the reader towards a critical evaluation". (Note: ..."im Sinne Tucholskys der Realitätsprüfung dienen, Hintergründe aufdecken und dem Leser bei einer kritischen Urteilsfindung helfen")

The prize was originally awarded by the Kurt Tucholsky Foundation to mark the sixtieth anniversary of Kurt Tucholsky's death. Since 2003 the Kurt-Tucholsky-Gesellschaft (Kurt Tucholsky Society) has been awarding the prize. The Foundation remains closely involved with the administration of the prize, but after the copyright on Tucholsky's writings lapsed it was no longer able to fund the prize.

== Recipients ==
- 1995: Konstantin Wecker
- 1996: Heribert Prantl
- 1997: Kurt Marti
- 1999: Daniela Dahn
- 2001: Harry Pross
- 2003: Wolfgang Büscher
- 2005: Erich Kuby
- 2007: Lothar Kusche and Otto Köhler
- 2009: Volker Weidermann
- 2011: Deniz Yücel
- 2013: Mario Kaiser
- 2015: Jochanan Trilse-Finkelstein
- 2017: Sönke Iwersen
- 2019: Margarete Stokowski
- 2021: Mely Kiyak
- 2023: Alexander Estis
- 2025: Maryam Aras
