= Hidden in Plain Sight =

2010 non-fiction book by Juha Suoranta

Hidden in Plain Sight (Piilottajan päiväkirja)
- First edition
- Author: Juha Suoranta
- Language: English
- Genre: Nonfiction
- Publisher: Into
- Publication date: 2010
- Publication place: Finland
- Media type: Print (Paperback)
- Pages: 142 p.
- ISBN: 978-952-01-0438-2

Hidden in Plain Sight (Finnish: Piilottajan päiväkirja) is a non-fiction book by Juha Suoranta. The book—based on the author's journal—is about his attempt to help a minor asylum seeker in Finland. In Finland, the book attracted publicity in newspapers, magazines, and blogosphere.

== Description ==
Hidden in Plain Sight is a non-fiction book by Juha Suoranta. The book is based on the author's journal during an effort to assist Ashraf Sahil—a minor asylum seeker in Finland—and to help him avoid deportation to inhuman conditions.

== Plot ==
Sahil, who as a young child had fled with his family from Afghanistan to Pakistan in the 1990, was first sent to Iran from where he was carried to Greece through Turkey by human smugglers. From there he traveled across Europe to Finland in summer 2008. The Finnish Immigration officials did not grant him a due asylum process but instead imposed a deportation when the author received an e-mail request for help from his sociologist friend in Minneapolis.

Suoranta states that he could not tolerate a situation "where a young person was about to be sent into an uncertain, perhaps life-threatening, situation. If it was in my power to do something, I had to do something.... Although I did not know what asylum, deportation, irregular immigration, or the Dublin agreement meant, it was necessary to try to do something, search for help, at least. When I found out that there was no organisation, including the church, which could help, I realised that I had a duty." Thus he hid the youngster to his late grandfather's apartment.

The book has three storylines or intertwined layers. In one level it describes in a form of a journal the actual incidents in chronological order, a 5-month period from March to August 2009. In other level it ponders the author's inner feelings and anxieties in a difficult and unprecedented circumstances. And yet in another level the text contains ethical and moral reflections pertaining universal questions of helping another human beings referring, among others, to sociologist Zygmunt Bauman and philosopher Peter Singer, especially his Practical Ethics and The Life You Can Save.

Suoranta's ethics in helping and hiding a stranger is as follows: "Suffering and death because of the lack of basic needs or protection are unnecessary. And if they can be prevented without notable sacrifices, compared to suffering and death, it is wrong not to help."

== Reception ==
In Finland, the book attracted publicity in newspapers, magazines and blogosphere as stories and book reviews; e.g. Helsingin Sanomat, the largest subscription newspaper in Finland, published a story in its Sunday pages titled "Good Tamperenian" in the eve of the book's publication.
