= Clemens Kuby =

German documentary writer and film maker (born 1947)

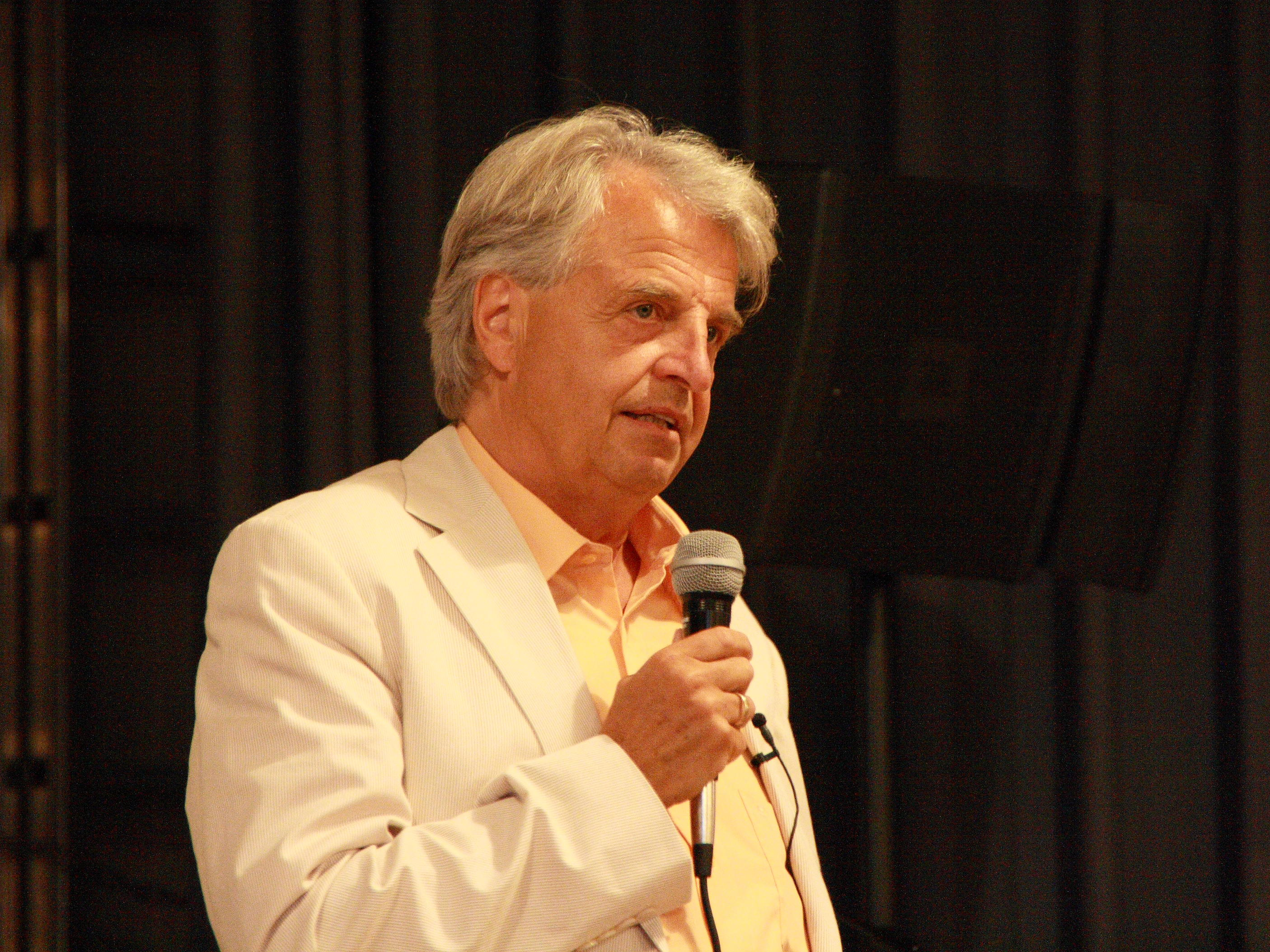
Clemens Kuby in September 2009 in Bad Mergentheim

Clemens Kuby (born 17 November 1947, in Herrsching am Ammersee) is a German documentary writer and film maker. He is a proponent of self-healing techniques. He is the nephew of Nobel Prize recipient Werner Heisenberg.

== Mental healing ==
Clemens calls his technique of self-healing mental healing.

== Works ==
=== Bibliography ===
(most books and movie were not translated into English)

- 1993 – Das alte Ladakh. Book about movie. ISBN 978-3-442-11402-3.
- 1994 – Living Buddha. Authors: Clemens Kuby and Ulli Olvedi, ISBN 978-3-442-42490-0.
- 2003 – Unterwegs in die nächste Dimension – Meine Reise zu Heilern und Schamanen (Travels into the next dimension). ISBN 978-3-466-34469-7.
- 2005 – Heilung – das Wunder in uns. Selbstheilungsprozesse entdecken (Healing – the miracle within ourselves). ISBN 978-3-466-34485-7.
- 2007 – Selbstheilungs-Navigator. With 64 cards. ISBN 978-3-466-34505-2.
- 2010 – Mental Healing – Das Geheimnis der Selbstheilung. (The secret of self-healing) 2010; ISBN 978-3-466-34535-9.
- 2012 – Mental Healing – Gesund ohne Medizin. Anleitung zum Andersdenken (Healthy without medicine. A guide different thinking process). ISBN 978-3-466-34581-6.

=== Filmography ===
- 1972 – Lehrlinge (1. place International Short Film Festival Oberhausen)
- 1983 – Schnappschuss (with Ariane Mnouchkine and Pina Bausch)
- 1984 – Mein Leben, das ich nicht mehr wollte
- 1986 – Das Alte Ladakh (Deutscher Filmpreis 1987)
- 1986 – Der Dalai Lama zwischen Orient und Occident
- 1987 – Neuseeland zu Pferde
- 1988 – Tibet – Widerstand des Geistes
- 1989 – Die Not der Frauen Tibets
- 1990 – Drei Jahre und drei Monate in Klausur
- 1994 – Living Buddha (Bavarian Film Awards 1994)
- 1996 – Todas – am Rande des Paradieses
- 2001 – Das Leben ist eine Illusion (Life is an illusion)
- 2002 – Unterwegs in die nächste Dimension (Travel to the next dimmension)

=== DVD ===
- 1987 – Das Alte Ladakh
- 1989 – Not und Frieden in Tibet: Die Not der Frauen Tibets. Dalai Lama – Frieden des Geistes
- 1996 – Todas – Am Rande des Paradieses
- 2004 – Unterwegs in die nächste Dimension
- 2006 – Selbstheilung in 6 Schritten – Joao de Deus
- 2006 – Tibet – Widerstand des Geistes
- 2006 – Living Buddha
- 2006 – Der Dreh zu Living Buddha
- 2007 – Der Mensch – ein geistiges Wesen
- 2007 – Die Melodie des Universums – Global Scaling
- 2007 – Seelenschreiben
- 2008 – Alles ist möglich – Das Spektrum der Selbstheilung
- 2009 – Heilung – das Wunder in uns

=== Audiobooks ===
- 2006 – Unterwegs in die nächste Dimension – Meine Reise zu Heilern und Schamanen. (Audiobook) (Audio CD). ISBN 978-3-466-45795-3.
- 2009 – Heilung – das Wunder in uns. Selbstheilungsprozesse entdecken (Audiobook) (Audio CD). ISBN 978-3-466-45835-6.

=== Audio-CDs ===
- 2009 – Heilung – das Wunder in uns – original sound track. ISBN 978-3-932486-25-8.
