= Drochów Górny =

- Village
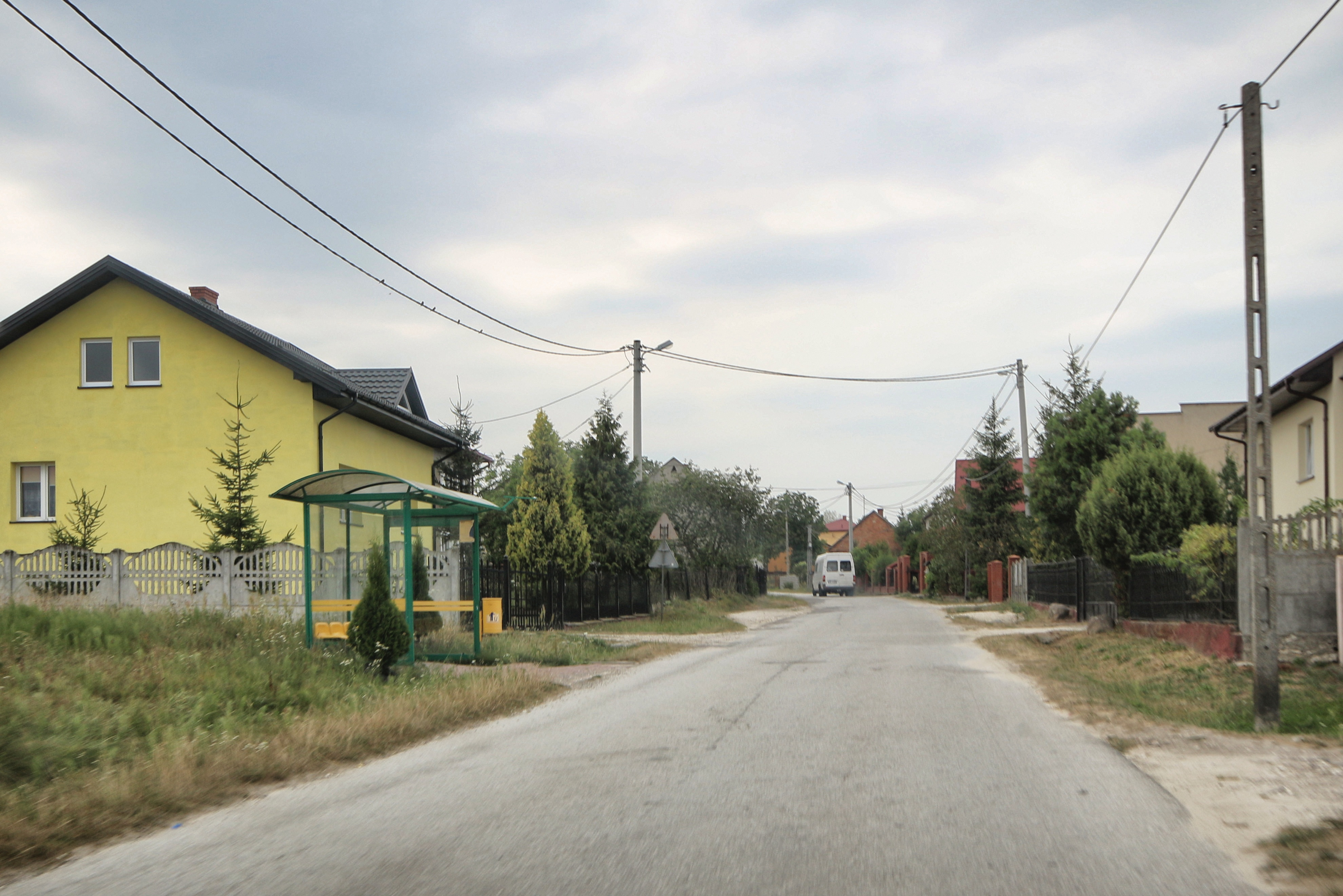

- Location within Poland
- Coordinates: 50°41′33″N 20°34′22″E
- Country: Poland
- Voivodeship: Świętokrzyskie
- County: Kielce
- Gmina: Morawica
- Population: 180

Drochów Górny [ˈdrɔxuf ˈɡurnɨ] is a village in the administrative district of Gmina Morawica, within Kielce County, Świętokrzyskie Voivodeship, in south-central Poland. It lies approximately 7 km (4 mi) south-west of Morawica and 22 km (14 mi) south of the regional capital Kielce.
