= Chmielowice =

Chmielowice may refer to:

- Chmielowice, Opole Voivodeship, Poland
- Chmielowice, Świętokrzyskie Voivodeship, Poland
