= Zbrzyca (disambiguation) =

Zbrzyca may refer to:

- Zbrzyca (river), Poland
- Zbrzyca, Chojnice County, a village in Poland
- Zbrzyca, Człuchów County, a village in Poland
- Jan Zbrzyca, pen name of Stanisław Pestka

== See also ==
- Zbrza
