= Animal advocacy =

Animal advocacy may refer to:

- Animal protectionism, the view favors incremental change in pursuit of non-human animal interests
- Animal rights, the idea that non-human animals are entitled to the possession of their own lives
- Animal rights movement, advocacy for the idea of animal rights
- Animal welfare, support for the well-being of animals

== See also ==
- List of animal advocacy parties
- List of animal rights advocates
- List of animal welfare groups
