= Radomice Pierwsze =

- Village
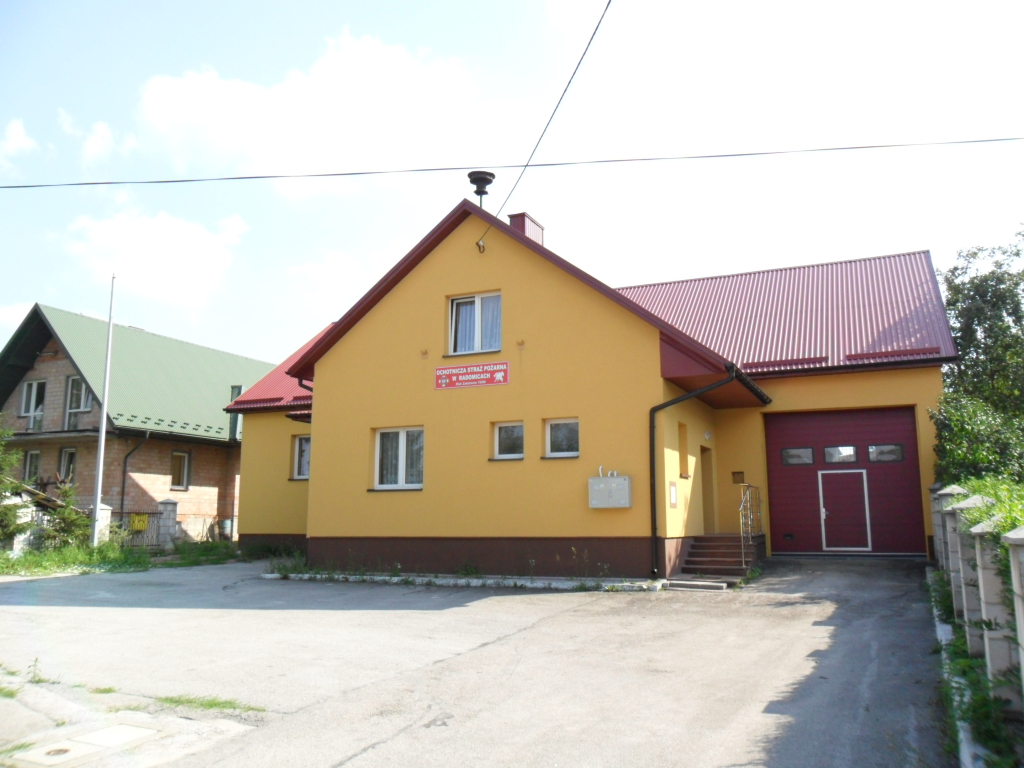
- Fire station

- Location within Poland
- Coordinates: 50°44′7″N 20°40′8″E
- Country: Poland
- Voivodeship: Świętokrzyskie
- County: Kielce
- Gmina: Morawica

Radomice Pierwsze [radɔˈmit͡sɛ ˈpjɛrfʂɛ] is a village in the administrative district of Gmina Morawica, within Kielce County, Świętokrzyskie Voivodeship, in south-central Poland. It lies approximately 4 km (2 mi) east of Morawica and 17 km (11 mi) south of the regional capital Kielce.
