= Łabędziów =

- Village
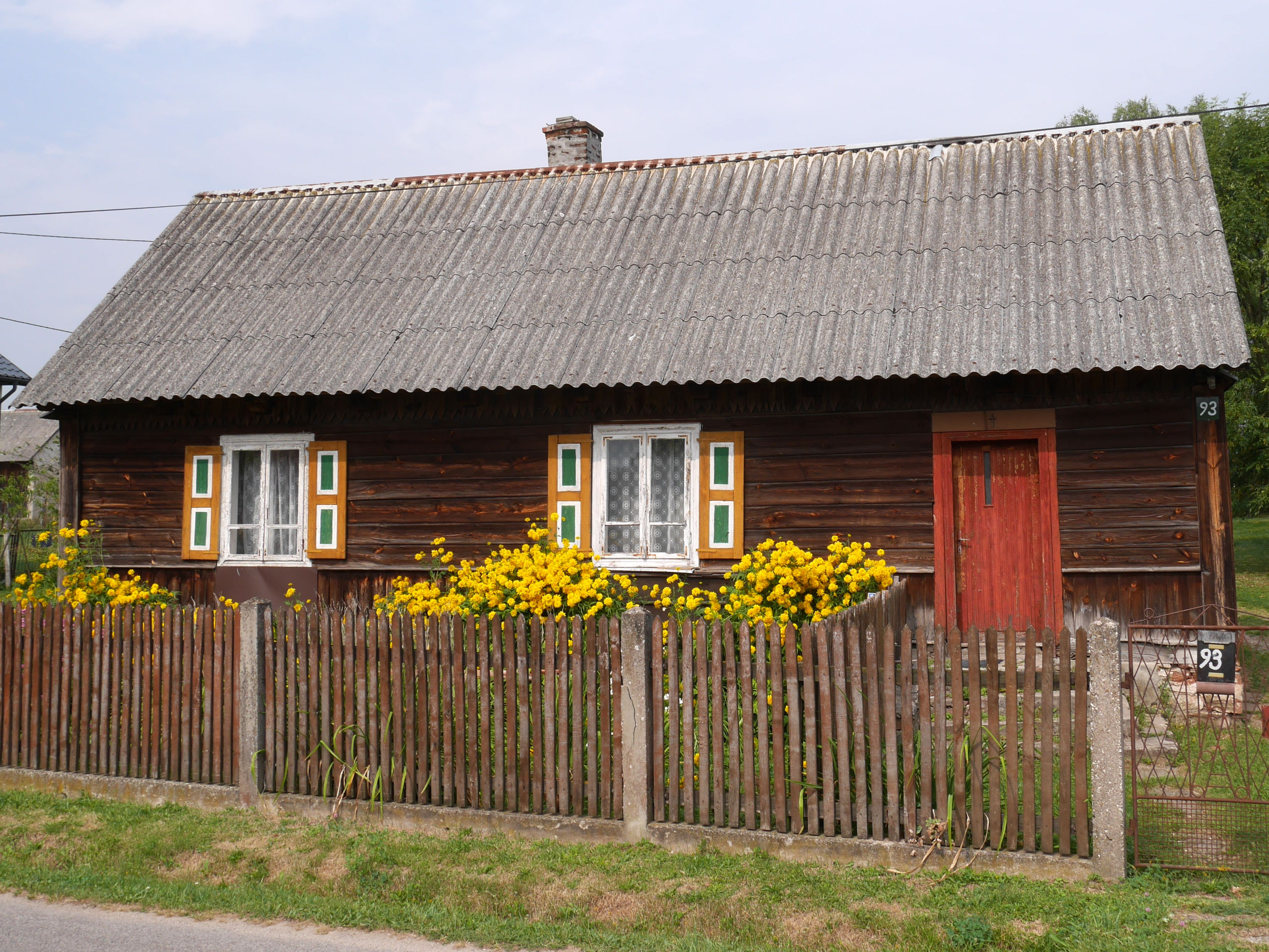
- Wooden house

- Location within Poland
- Coordinates: 50°44′45″N 20°38′42″E
- Country: Poland
- Voivodeship: Świętokrzyskie
- County: Kielce
- Gmina: Morawica
- Population: 220

Łabędziów [waˈbɛnd͡ʑuf] is a village in the administrative district of Gmina Morawica, within Kielce County, Świętokrzyskie Voivodeship, in south-central Poland. It lies approximately 2 km (1 mi) east of Morawica and 16 km (10 mi) south of the regional capital Kielce.
