= Kawczyn =

Kawczyn may refer to the following places:

- Kawczyn, Czarnków-Trzcianka County in Greater Poland Voivodeship (west-central Poland)
- Kawczyn, Kościan County in Greater Poland Voivodeship (west-central Poland)
- Kawczyn, Świętokrzyskie Voivodeship (south-central Poland)
- Kawczyn, Pomeranian Voivodeship (north Poland)
- Kawczyn, West Pomeranian Voivodeship (north-west Poland)
