= Podwole =

- Village
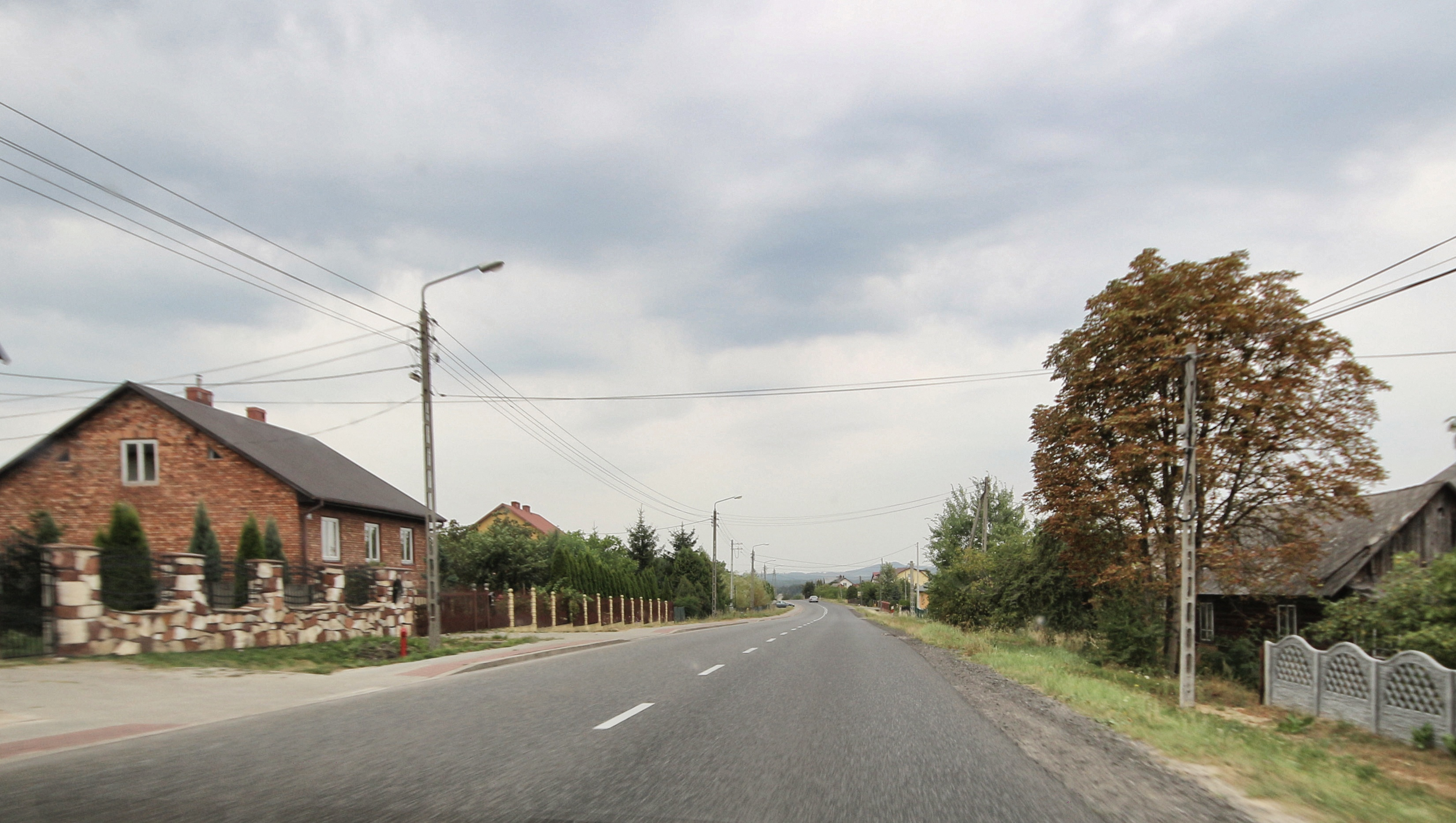

- Location within Poland
- Coordinates: 50°47′N 20°33′E
- Country: Poland
- Voivodeship: Świętokrzyskie
- County: Kielce
- Gmina: Morawica

Podwole [pɔdˈvɔlɛ] is a village in the administrative district of Gmina Morawica, within Kielce County, Świętokrzyskie Voivodeship, in south-central Poland. It lies approximately 8 km (5 mi) north-west of Morawica and 13 km (8 mi) south-west of the regional capital Kielce.
