= Kuby-Młyny =

- Village
- Location within Poland
- Coordinates: 50°46′13″N 20°40′5″E
- Country: Poland
- Voivodeship: Świętokrzyskie
- County: Kielce
- Gmina: Morawica
- Population: 130

Kuby-Młyny [ˈkubɨ ˈmwɨnɨ] is a village in the administrative district of Gmina Morawica, within Kielce County, Świętokrzyskie Voivodeship, in south-central Poland. It lies approximately 5 km (3 mi) north-east of Morawica and 14 km (9 mi) south of the regional capital Kielce.
