= Bilcza =

Bilcza refers to the following places in Poland:

- Bilcza, Kielce County
- Bilcza, Sandomierz County
