= Animal protection =

Animal protection may refer or be related to:

- Animal law
- Animal protectionism
- Animal rights, including a list of animal welfare and rights by country
  - Animal rights movement
- Animal shelter
- Animal welfare
- Conservation biology
- Protected species

== See also ==
- Animal cruelty
- List of animal advocacy parties
- List of animal rights advocates
- List of animal rights groups
- List of animal welfare organisations
