= Brudzów =

- Village
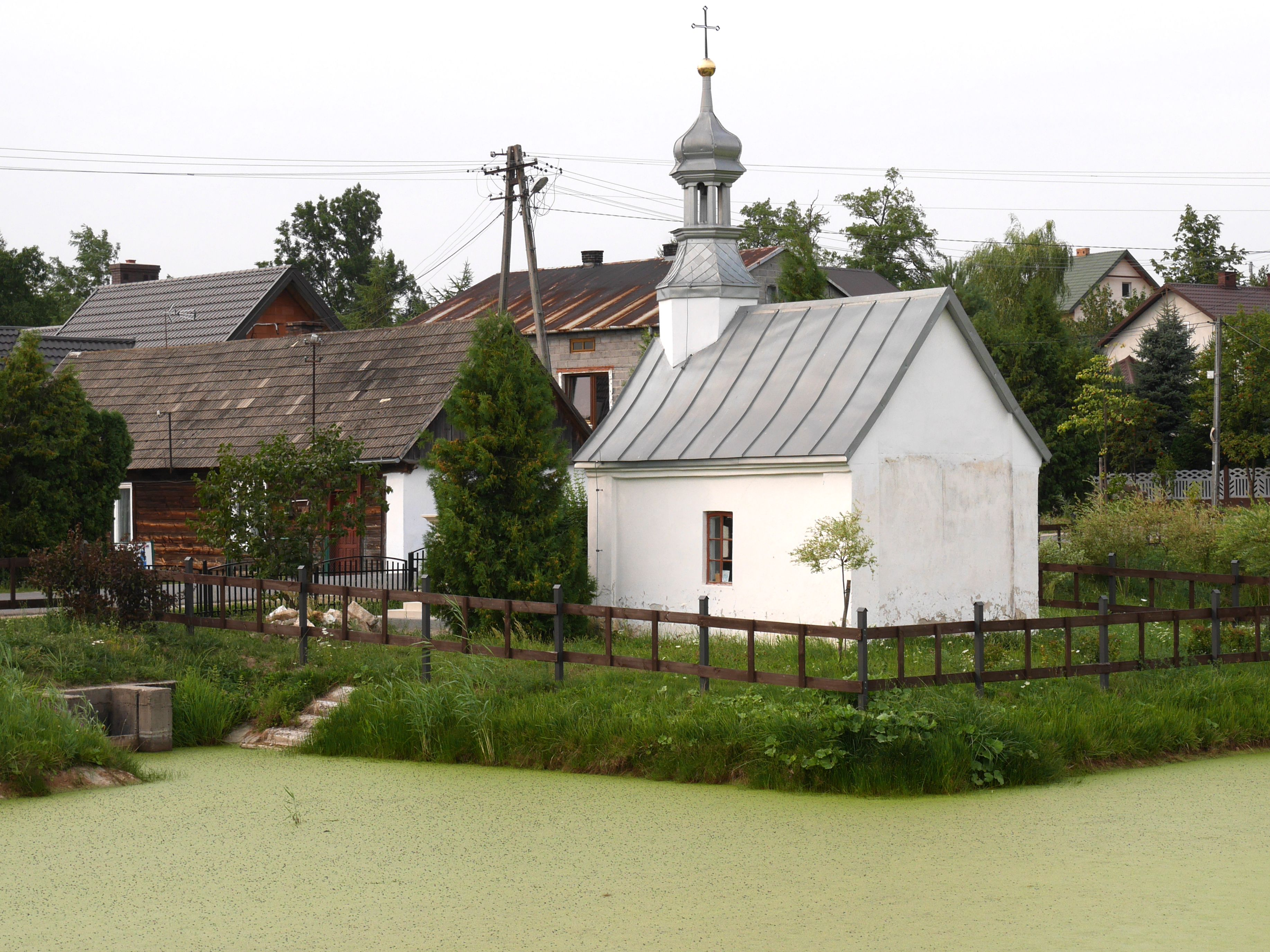

- Location within Poland
- Coordinates: 50°43′07″N 20°40′22″E
- Country: Poland
- Voivodeship: Świętokrzyskie
- County: Kielce
- Gmina: Morawica
- Population: 450

Brudzów [ˈbrud͡zuf] is a village in the administrative district of Gmina Morawica, within Kielce County, Świętokrzyskie Voivodeship, in south-central Poland. It lies approximately 5 km (3 mi) south-east of Morawica and 19 km (12 mi) south of the regional capital Kielce.
