= Zaborze, Kielce County =

Zaborze
- Village
- Location within Poland
- Coordinates: 50°42′19″N 20°40′33″E
- Country: Poland
- Voivodeship: Świętokrzyskie
- County: Kielce
- Gmina: Morawica
- Population: 190

Zaborze [zaˈbɔʐɛ] is a village in the administrative district of Gmina Morawica, within Kielce County, Świętokrzyskie Voivodeship, in south-central Poland. It lies approximately 6 km (4 mi) south-east of Morawica and 21 km (13 mi) south of the regional capital Kielce.
