= Bieleckie Młyny =

- Village
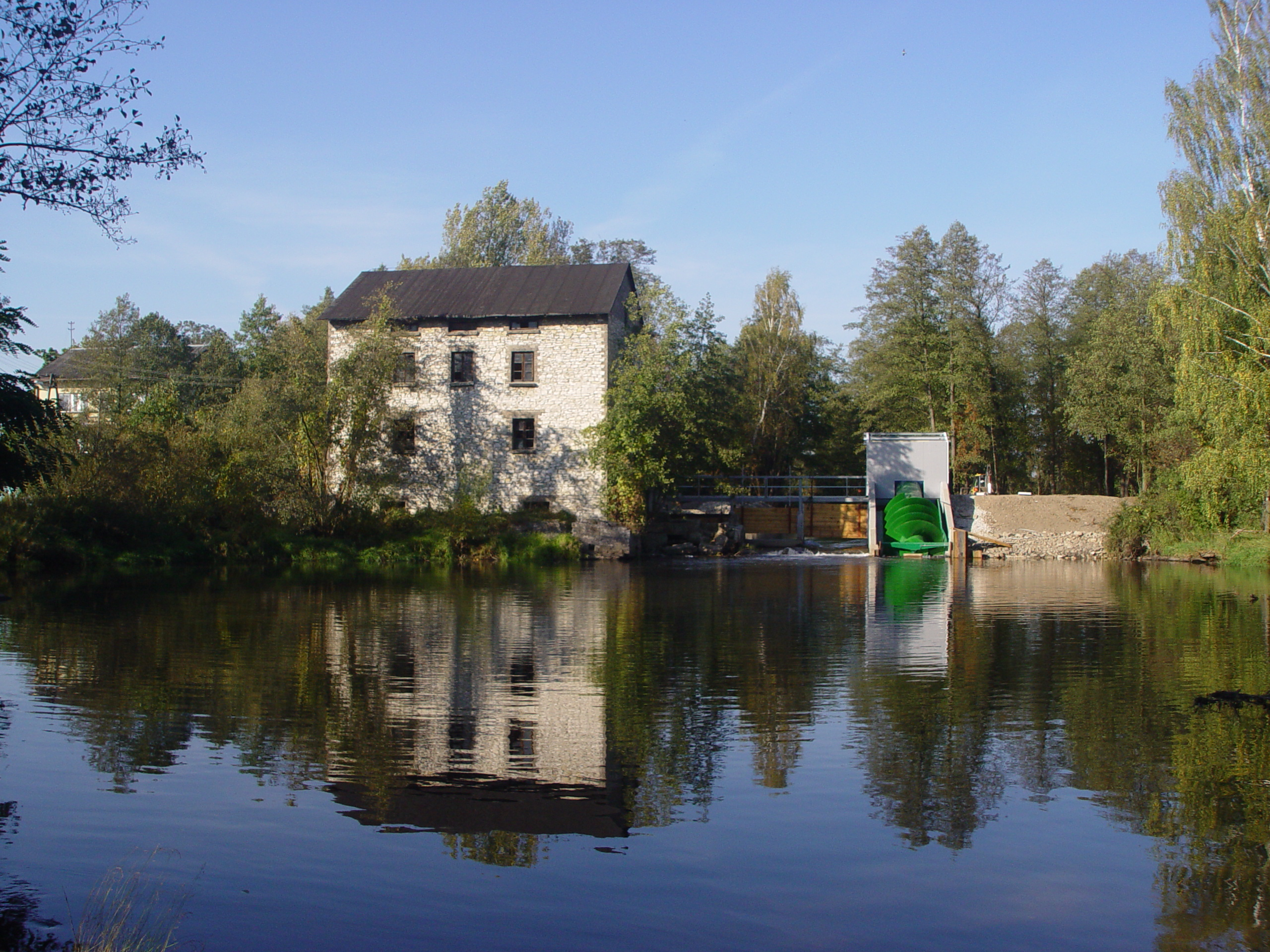

- Location within Poland
- Coordinates: 50°44′51″N 20°37′30″E
- Country: Poland
- Voivodeship: Świętokrzyskie
- County: Kielce
- Gmina: Morawica

Bieleckie Młyny [bjɛˈlɛt͡skʲɛ ˈmwɨnɨ] is a village in the administrative district of Gmina Morawica, within Kielce County, Świętokrzyskie Voivodeship, in south-central Poland. It lies approximately 1 km (1 mi) north of Morawica and 16 km (10 mi) south of the regional capital Kielce.
