= Dębska Wola =

- Village
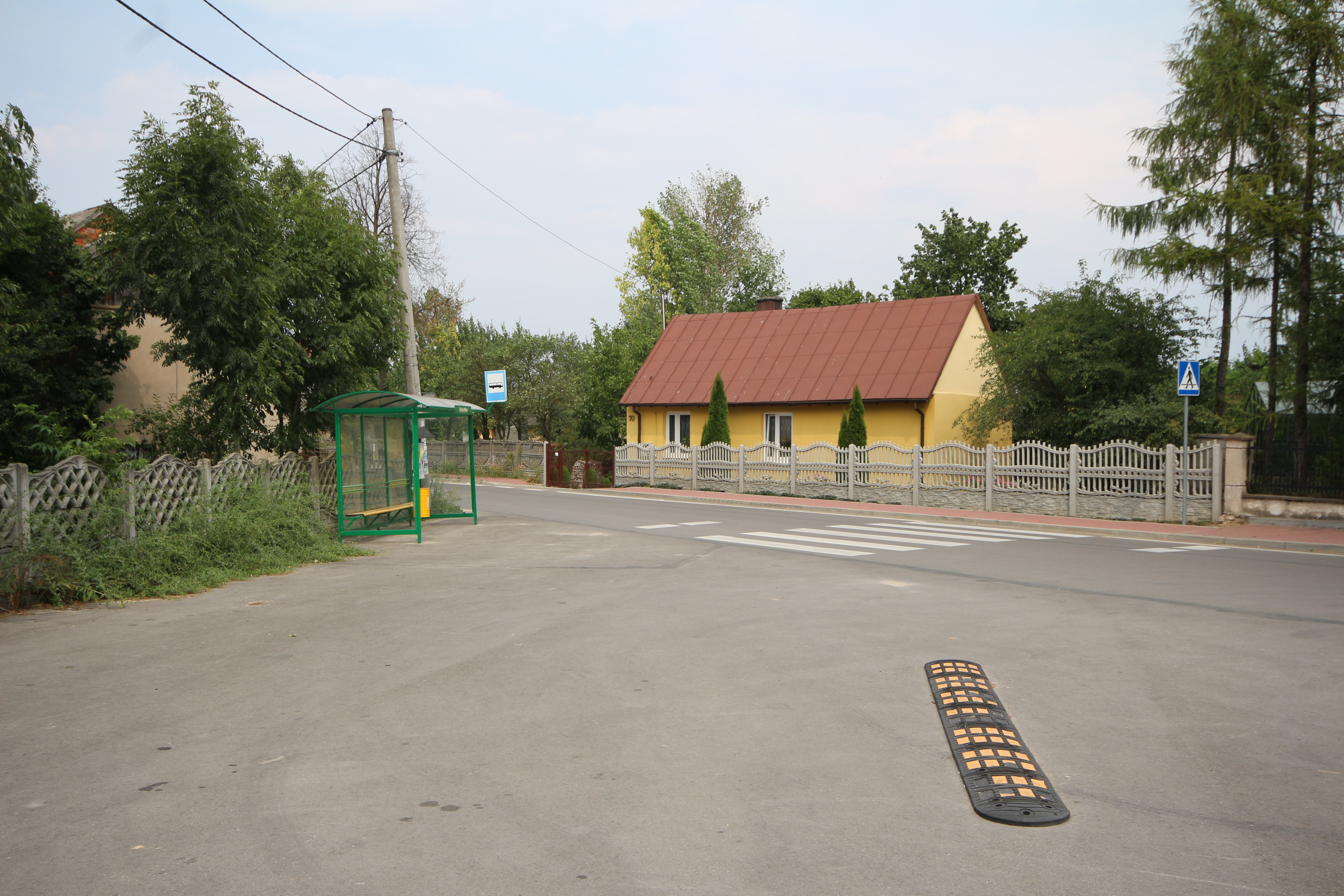

- Location within Poland
- Coordinates: 50°42′55″N 20°35′48″E
- Country: Poland
- Voivodeship: Świętokrzyskie
- County: Kielce
- Gmina: Morawica
- Population: 650

Dębska Wola [ˈdɛmpska ˈvɔla] is a village in the administrative district of Gmina Morawica, within Kielce County, Świętokrzyskie Voivodeship, in south-central Poland. It lies approximately 4 km (2 mi) south-west of Morawica and 19 km (12 mi) south of the regional capital Kielce.
