= Radomice Drugie =

- Village
- Location within Poland
- Coordinates: 50°44′38″N 20°41′10″E
- Country: Poland
- Voivodeship: Świętokrzyskie
- County: Kielce
- Gmina: Morawica
- Population: 333

Radomice Drugie [radɔˈmit͡sɛ ˈdruɡʲɛ] is a village in the administrative district of Gmina Morawica, within Kielce County, Świętokrzyskie Voivodeship, in south-central Poland. It lies approximately 5 km (3 mi) east of Morawica and 17 km (11 mi) south of the regional capital Kielce.
