= Piaseczna Górka =

- Village
- Location within Poland
- Coordinates: 50°46′4″N 20°37′15″E
- Country: Poland
- Voivodeship: Świętokrzyskie
- County: Kielce
- Gmina: Morawica
- Population: 330

Piaseczna Górka [pjaˈsɛt͡ʂna ˈɡurka] is a village in the administrative district of Gmina Morawica, within Kielce County, Świętokrzyskie Voivodeship, in south-central Poland. It lies approximately 3 km (2 mi) north of Morawica and 13 km (8 mi) south of the regional capital Kielce.
