= Lisów, Kielce County =

Lisów
- Village
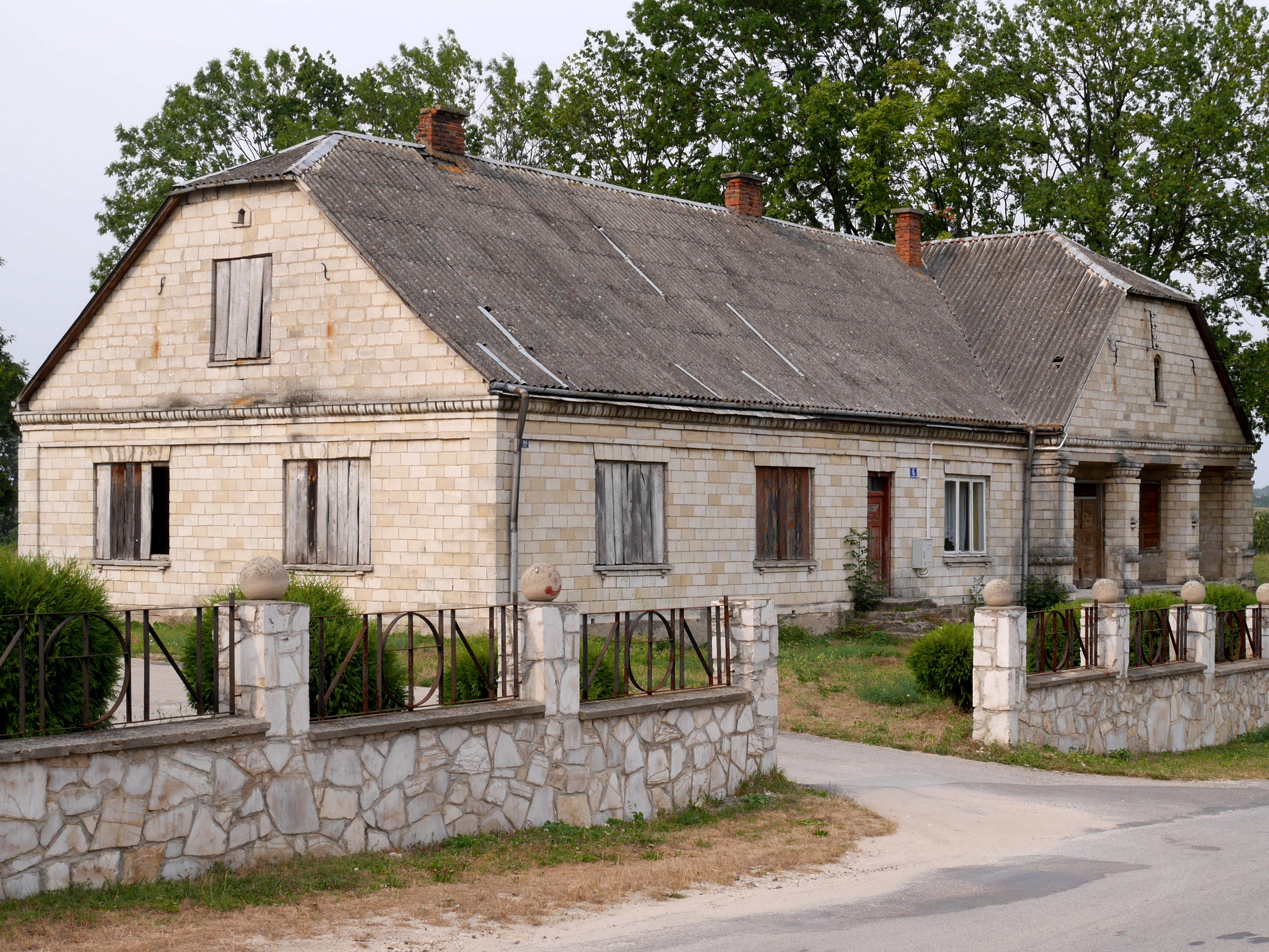
- Parsonage

- Location within Poland
- Coordinates: 50°41′25″N 20°39′45″E
- Country: Poland
- Voivodeship: Świętokrzyskie
- County: Kielce
- Gmina: Morawica
- Population: 390

Lisów [ˈlisuf] is a village in the administrative district of Gmina Morawica, within Kielce County, Świętokrzyskie Voivodeship, in south-central Poland. It lies approximately 7 km (4 mi) south-east of Morawica and 22 km (14 mi) south of the regional capital Kielce.

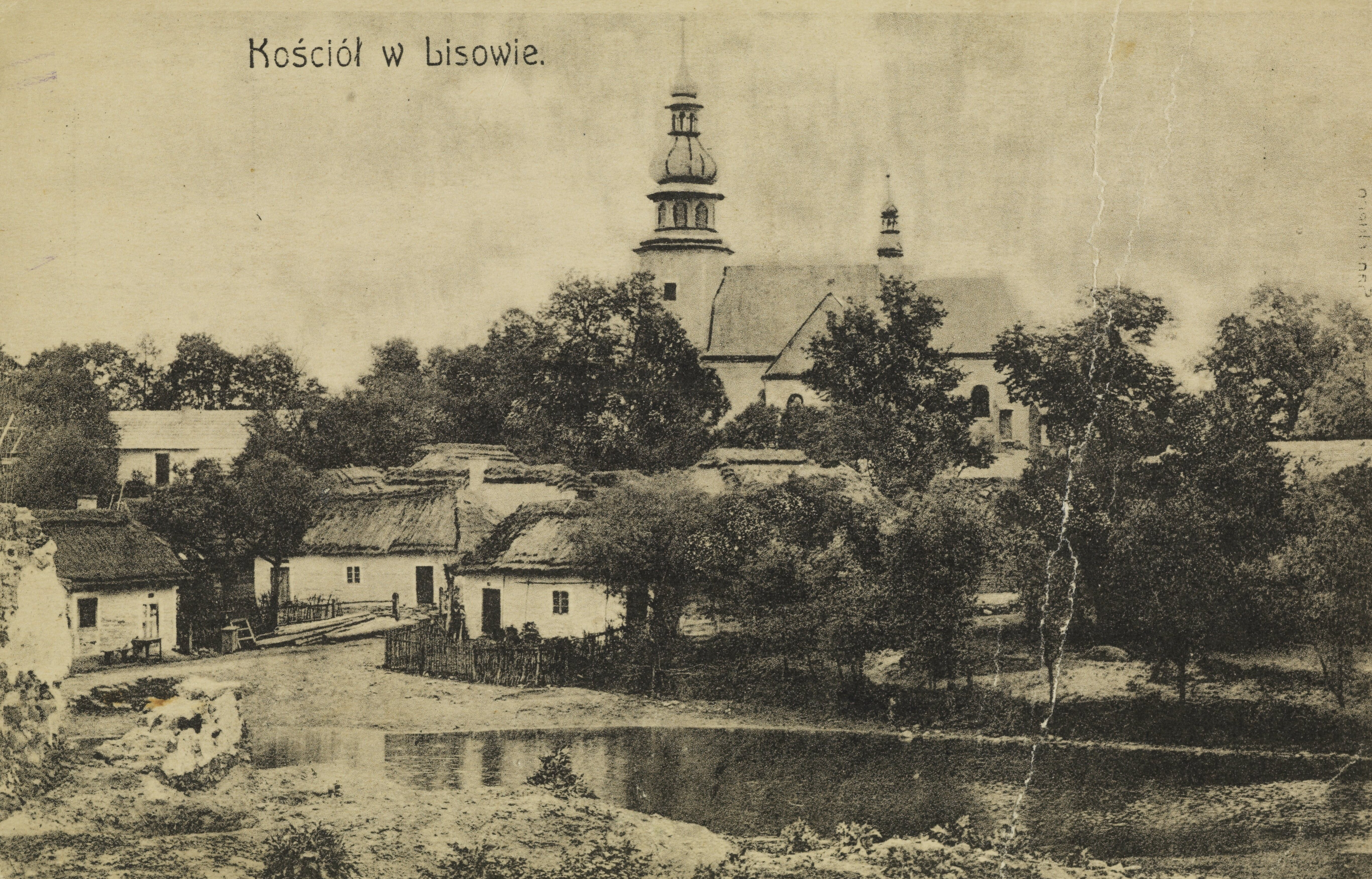
View of the village and church before 1920
