= Wola Morawicka =

- Village
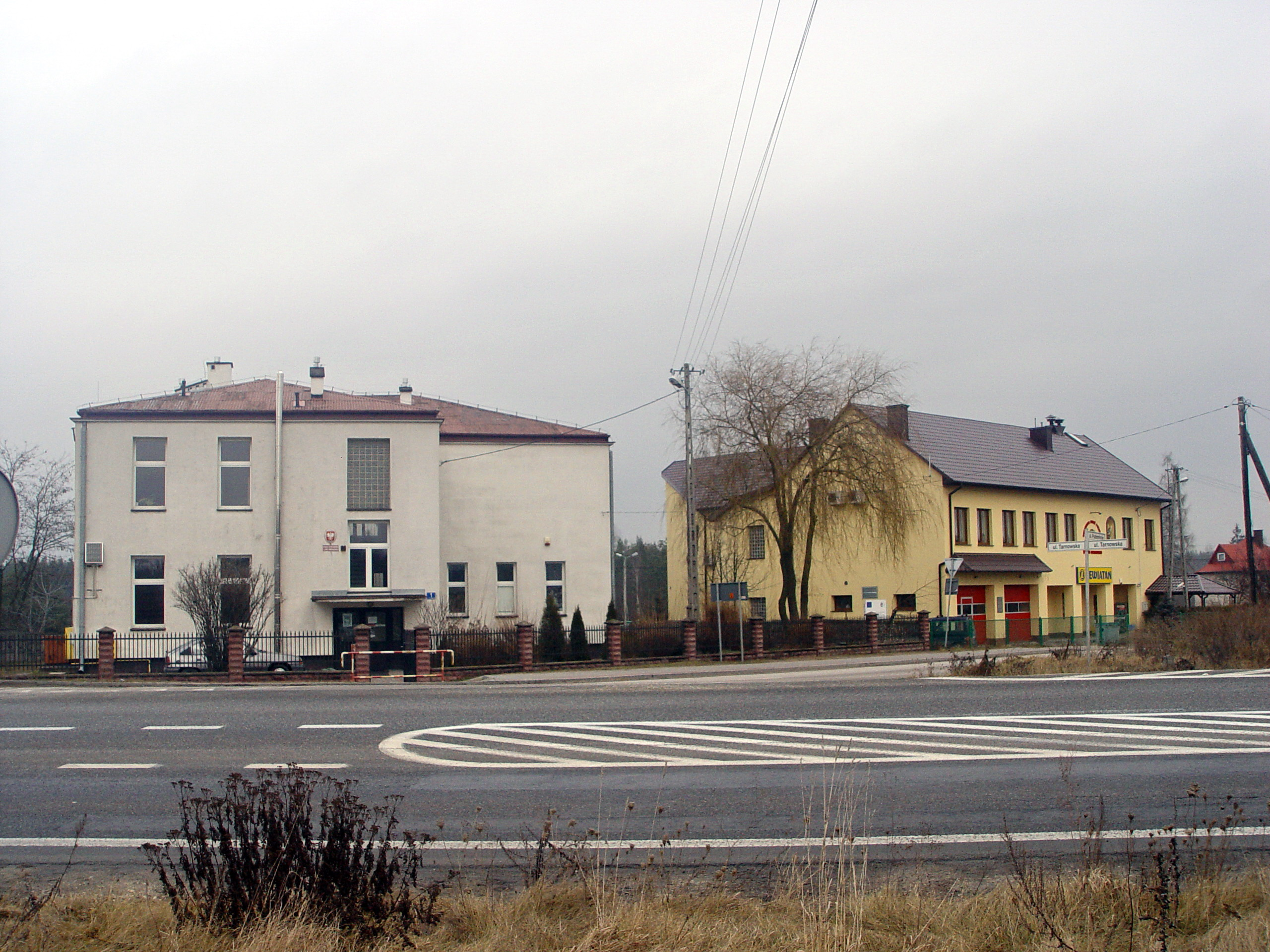

- Location within Poland
- Coordinates: 50°44′12″N 20°37′59″E
- Country: Poland
- Voivodeship: Świętokrzyskie
- County: Kielce
- Gmina: Morawica
- Population: 810

Wola Morawicka [ˈvɔla mɔraˈvit͡ska] is a village in the administrative district of Gmina Morawica, within Kielce County, Świętokrzyskie Voivodeship, in south-central Poland. It lies approximately 1 km (1 mi) south-east of Morawica and 17 km (11 mi) south of the regional capital Kielce.
