= Obice =

- Village
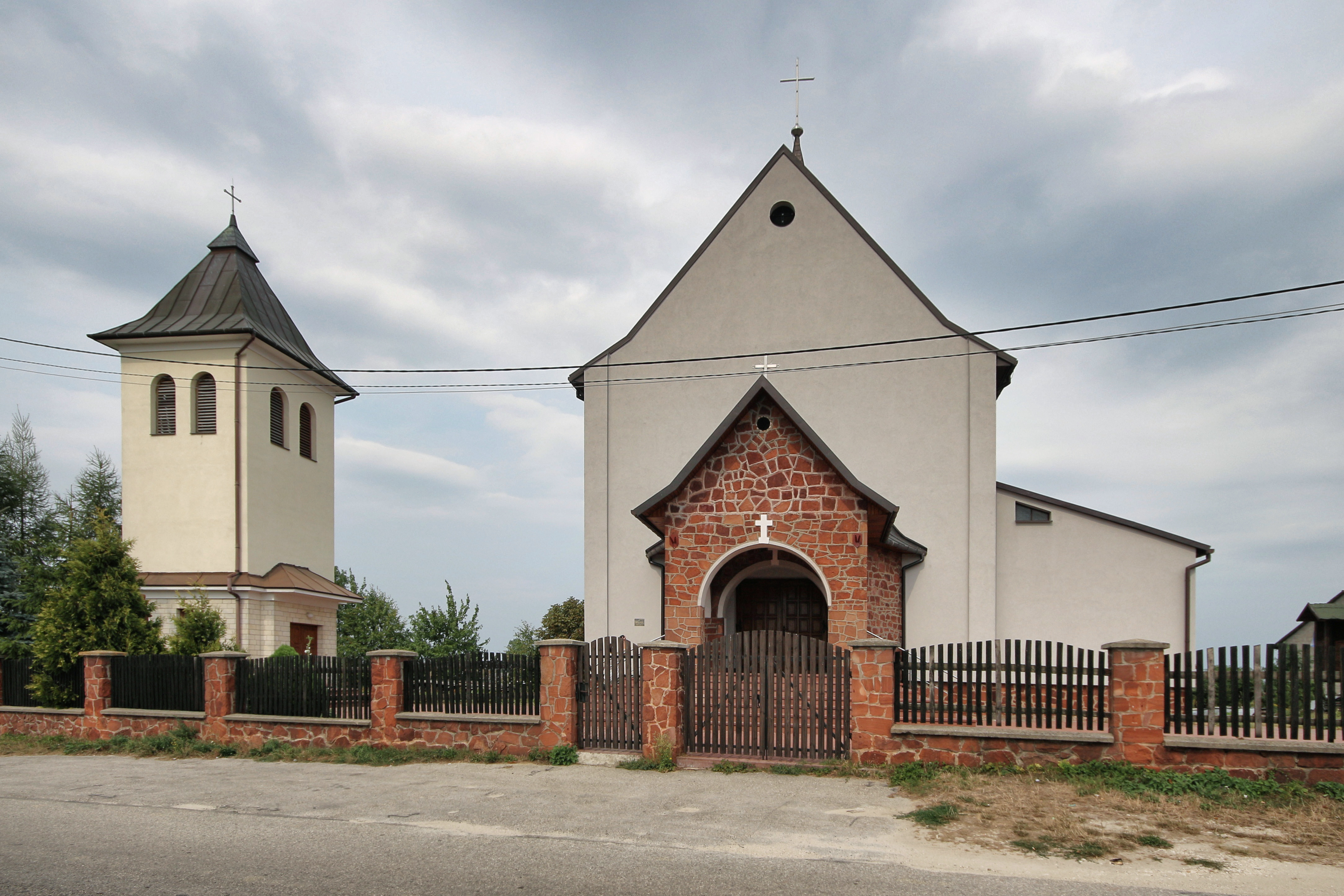
- Catholic church

- Location within Poland
- Coordinates: 50°40′56″N 20°36′9″E
- Country: Poland
- Voivodeship: Świętokrzyskie
- County: Kielce
- Gmina: Morawica
- Population: 630

Obice [ɔˈbit͡sɛ] is a village in the administrative district of Gmina Morawica, within Kielce County, Świętokrzyskie Voivodeship, in south-central Poland. It lies approximately 7 km (4 mi) south of Morawica and 23 km (14 mi) south of the regional capital Kielce.
