= Brzeziny, Kielce County =

Brzeziny
- Village
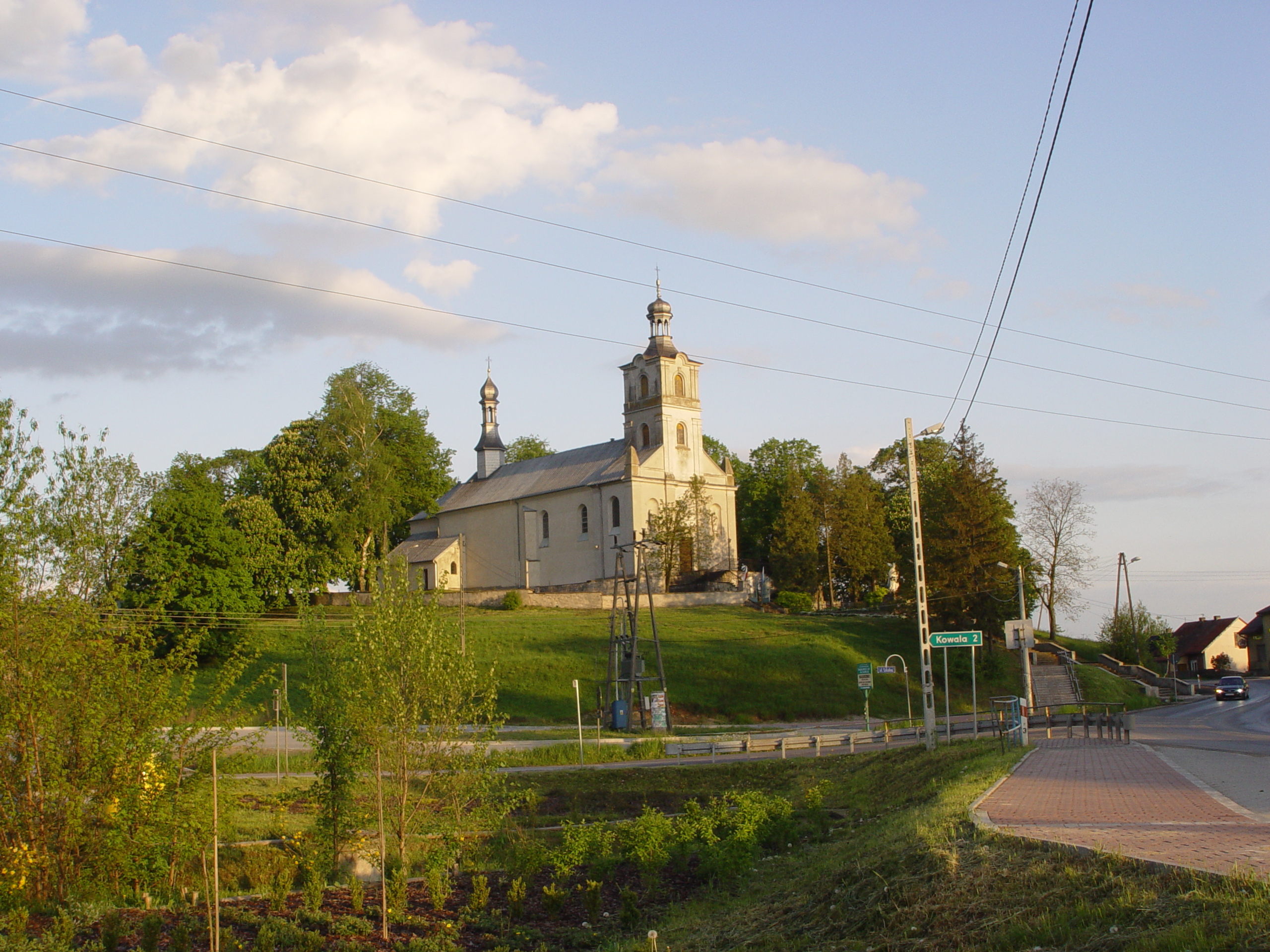

- Location within Poland
- Coordinates: 50°45′39″N 20°35′44″E
- Country: Poland
- Voivodeship: Świętokrzyskie
- County: Kielce
- Gmina: Morawica
- Population: 1,944
- Website: http://www.brzeziny.org.pl/

Brzeziny [bʐɛˈʑinɨ] is a village in the administrative district of Gmina Morawica, within Kielce County, Świętokrzyskie Voivodeship, in south-central Poland. It lies approximately 4 km (2 mi) north-west of Morawica and 14 km (9 mi) south of the regional capital Kielce.
