= Chałupki, Kielce County =

Chałupki
- Village
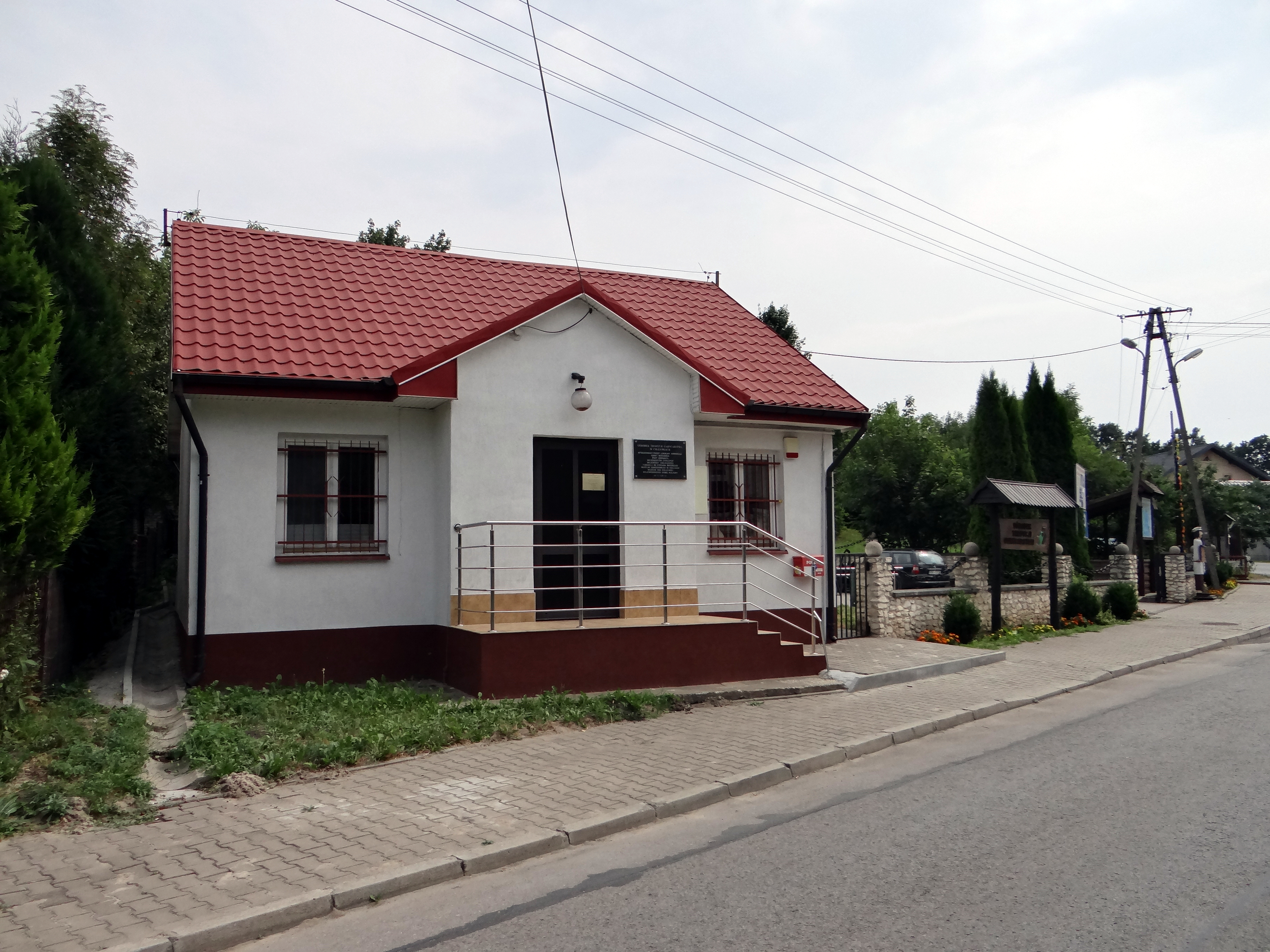
- Museum

- Location within Poland
- Coordinates: 50°42′13″N 20°36′24″E
- Country: Poland
- Voivodeship: Świętokrzyskie
- County: Kielce
- Gmina: Morawica
- Population: 300

Chałupki [xaˈwupki] is a village in the administrative district of Gmina Morawica, within Kielce County, Świętokrzyskie Voivodeship, in south-central Poland. It lies approximately 5 km (3 mi) south of Morawica and 20 km (12 mi) south of the regional capital Kielce.
