= Gmina Morawica =

Gmina Morawica Morawica Commune
- Gmina
- Coat of arms
- Interactive map of Gmina Morawica
- Coordinates (Morawica): 50°44′28″N 20°37′36″E
- Country: Poland
- Voivodeship: Świętokrzyskie
- County: Kielce County
- Seat: Morawica

Area
  - Total: 140.45 km^{2} (54.23 sq mi)

Population (2006)
  - Total: 13,380
  - Density: 95.27/km^{2} (246.7/sq mi)
- Website: http://www.morawica.pl

Gmina Morawica is an urban-rural gmina (administrative district) in Kielce County, Świętokrzyskie Voivodeship, in south-central Poland. Its seat is the village of Morawica, which lies approximately 16 kilometres (10 mi) south of the regional capital Kielce.

The gmina covers an area of 140.45 square kilometres (54.2 sq mi), and as of 2006 its total population is 13,380.

== Villages ==
Gmina Morawica contains the villages and settlements of Bieleckie Młyny, Bilcza, Brudzów, Brzeziny, Chałupki, Chmielowice, Dębska Wola, Drochów Dolny, Drochów Górny, Dyminy-Granice, Kawczyn, Kuby-Młyny, Łabędziów, Lisów, Morawica, Nida, Obice, Piaseczna Górka, Podwole, Radomice Drugie, Radomice Pierwsze, Wola Morawicka, Zaborze and Zbrza.

== Neighbouring gminas ==
Gmina Morawica is bordered by the city of Kielce and by the gminas of Chęciny, Chmielnik, Daleszyce, Kije, Pierzchnica, Sitkówka-Nowiny and Sobków.
