= Dyminy-Granice =

- Village
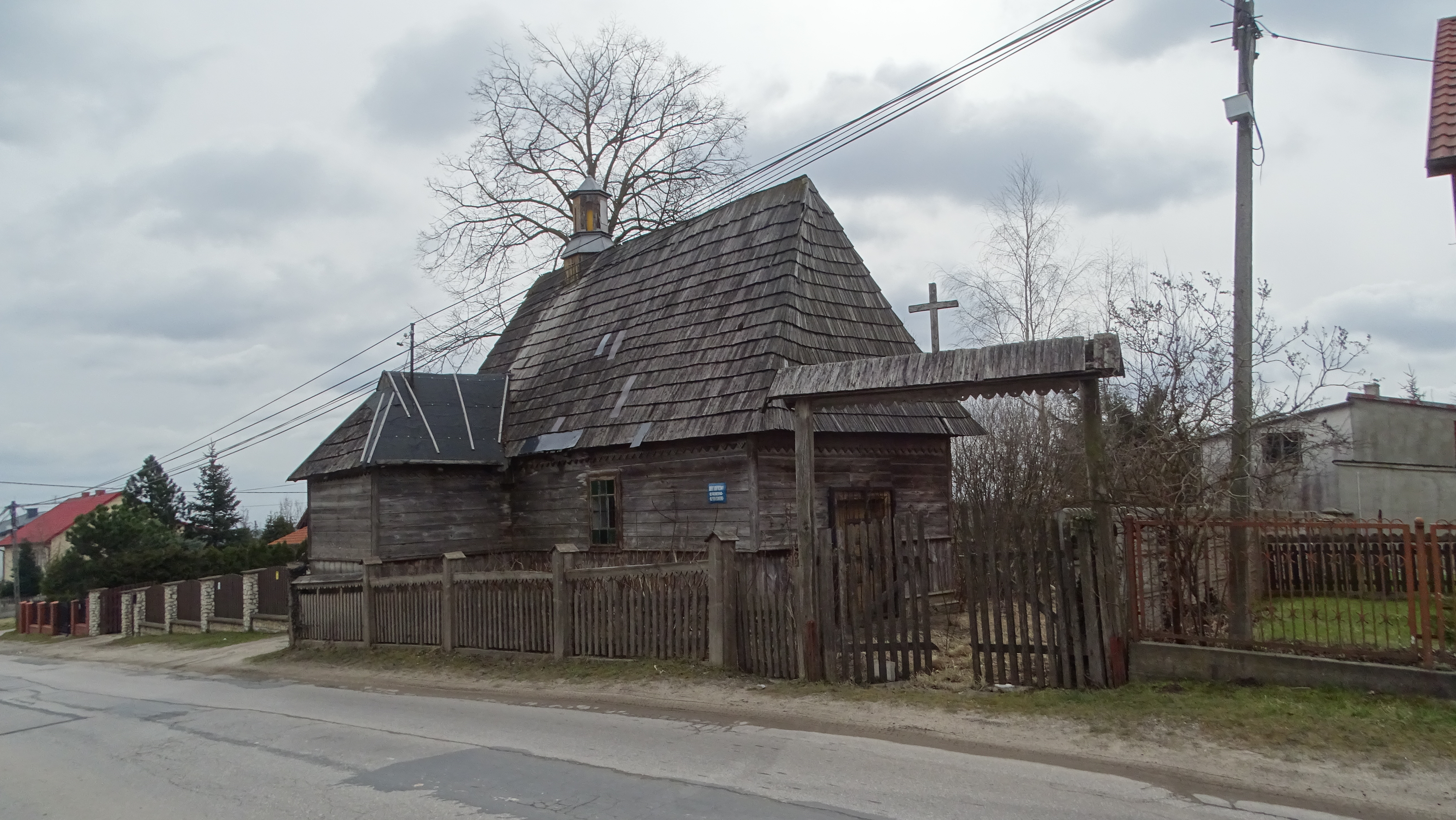
- Chapel

- Location within Poland
- Coordinates: 50°48′N 20°40′E
- Country: Poland
- Voivodeship: Świętokrzyskie
- County: Kielce
- Gmina: Morawica
- Population: 160

Dyminy-Granice [dɨˈminɨ ɡraˈnit͡sɛ] is a village in the administrative district of Gmina Morawica, within Kielce County, Świętokrzyskie Voivodeship, in south-central Poland. It lies approximately 8 km (5 mi) north-east of Morawica and 10 km (6 mi) south of the regional capital Kielce.
