= Polish Party of Animal Protection =

Polish political party

Polish Party of Animal Protection Polska Partia Ochrony Zwierząt
- Abbreviation: PPOZ
- Leader: Andrzej Olszewski
- Founded: 24 February 2011
- Registered: 21 November 2018
- Headquarters: ul. Sienkiewicza 12 57-320 Polanica-Zdrój
- Membership (2019): 400
- Ideology: Animal rights Animal welfare Environmentalism; Vegetarianism; Green politics Social democracy
- Political position: Left-wing
- Colours: Green
- Sejm: 0 / 460
- Senate: 0 / 100
- European Parliament: 0 / 51
- Regional assemblies: 0 / 552
- City presidents: 0 / 117

Website
- http://partiadlazwierzat.pl/

Polish Party of Animal Protection (Polish: Polska Partia Ochrony Zwierząt, PPOZ) is an animal rights party in Poland founded in 2011 and registered in 2018 by animal rights activists. The party brings together animal protection groups from all over Poland, initially coming from an animal foundation Pod Psią Gwiazdą in Kłodzko. The party cites the Dutch Party for the Animals as one of its inspirations and wishes to improve the animal protection in Poland by political activism. Apart from Polanica-Zdrój, the Polish Party of Animal Protection also has party structures in Gdynia, Wrocław, Katowice and Poznań.

The party is made up of animal lovers and activists associated with animal protection and no-kill pet shelters. Main objectives of the party include improving the living conditions of pets and farm animals, as well as phasing out meat production in favour of vegetarianism. The party fields activists of animal advocacy organisations, arguing that the politicians of the Sejm had failed to bring about any change in terms of animal rights. The PPOZ wants animal owners to be more accountable and introduce harsher penalties for animal torture and abuse. The PPOZ mainly addresses and campaigns against chained dog abuse, mass cattle and poultry farming, fur farming, animal slaughter, animal use in circuses and laboratories, climate change and hunting.

== History ==
The party first emerged in Polish politics in 2011, when it became a social and political movement. According to Małgorzata Frąc, a pro-animal organisation activists that became the founder of the Polish Party of Animal Protection, the activists were motivated to found a party after a scandal at the shelter in Dyminy-Granice near Kielce, where dogs were found to live in gruesome conditions. The organisation sent multiple proposals to the Polish Ministry of Agriculture, which were either ignored or denied without debate. It was concluded that social organisations are unable to push through changes in the law, and so the PPOZ became a political party instead of a social organisation.

The main idea of the party was to promote vegetarianism and veganism, along with animal rights. Main objectives listed by the forming party in 2011 were improving the living conditions of pets and farm animals, promoting veganism and vegetarianism as sustainable source of nutrition and harsher penalties for animal abuse. Its first known action was posting posters attacking Polish President Bronisław Komorowski, who caused controversy by publishing a gory photo of him standing next to a killed deer on his social media in 2011. The party distributed posters depicting a deer standing on the lying body of Komorowski with the caption "Komorowski has fallen" (Polish: Komorowski poległ). Some media accused the party of hate speech, asserting that the poster wished death upon Komorowski. The party became known for its harsh attacks on hunting, once stating that hunters should be treated in the same way as they treat animals. Komorowski abandoned hunting later in 2011.

The concept of the party was praised and supported by some Polish intellectuals and professors, such as Bartłomiej Biskup from the Pułtusk Academy of Humanities. Formulating the concept of a party that would campaign for improving the living conditions of animals and promote vegetarianism, the activists started collecting signatures needed to formally register the party. The Polish Party of Animal Protection was formally founded as a political party in June 2018, and registered a few months later on 21 November 2018; the party authorities were appointed on 1 September 2018.

The party announced its registration to the media, stating: "This is a powerful mobiliser for us; a sign that things are moving forward, that there is a real chance for animal rights to start being enforced consistently in our state. We hope that we are not the only ones who are ready for this, because only together with you can we start the journey together towards change for the better. Let it become our common, beautiful goal: to change the fate of Polish animals for the better. Let us show the world that Poles love and respect native wildlife!"

In August 2019, the party endorsed the "Official Animal Rights March 2019" organised in Warsaw, on 24 August 2019. The march was organised by the non-profit animal rights organisation Surge, as well as "Poland for Animals" (Polish: Polska Dla Zwierząt). The march was attended by around 600 people, doubling the number of its participants in comparison to 2018. The main goal of the march was to protest against systemic violence against animals, which, according to participants, is still allowed and enabled by Polish law.

The party endorsed and praised the regulation on lawn-mowing in Wrocław, the capital city of Lower Silesian Voivodeship. In September 2019, the city council decided to stop mowing the lawn in parks and other green spaces around the city, a step taken in order to increase and maintain biodiversity. In the city's parks, signs with the following message were placed: "We do not mow the lawn, we feed the insects here". Commenting on the city's decision, the party stated: "An urban meadow is an ideal habitat for many species such as bees, shrews, lizards, hedgehogs and many, many other smaller members of our wonderful ecosystem. It is just as much an amenity for us humans. More plants, means cleaner air, a more beautiful landscape and more effective cooling in the heat of summer".

The Polish Party of Animal Protection registered an electoral committee for the 2019 Polish parliamentary election. However, it did not field any candidates. It failed to submit a financial report to the National Electoral Commission by the deadline in September 2019, leading to the party being deregistered. The party was deregistered from the register of political parties on 18 November 2019, nearly one year after its registration. However, the party was then registered again on 15 April 2021. The party leadership is composed of Lower Silesian animal rights activists - Andrzej Bogdan Olszewski was elected the chairman of the party, Katarzyna Beata Sowa became the deputy chairman of the party, while Andrzej Ochman was announced as the deputy chairman of the party's board. In 2025, the party registered no activity, although it continued to exist and submit reports.

== Program ==
The Polish Party of Animal Protection names social justice and ecological sustainability as its main priorities, and wants to fight "any harm done to defenceless creatures and senseless cruelty to animals". The party supports pro-animal non-governmental organisations to fulfill the role of monitoring and moderating the activities of the state institutions. It also proposes local and regional projects to provide financial support for local initiatives to improve animal rights. The party places particular emphasis on reforming education to teach and warn about animal cruelty, as well as their economical and cultural causes. The PPOZ also postulates legal regulations to secure the rights of animals, and preventing both their exploitation and slaughter, especially when done for economic reasons.

The party compares the meat industry and the current industrial exploitation of animals for commodities to slavery and concentration camps. The party believes that it is necessary to stop the slaughter of animals, considering it immoral and responsible for significant amount of pollution. The party states:

We despise all forms of slavery practised by our ancestors. We despise the concentration camps and the bestialities committed by humanity of the past. Do we want future generations to despise us when one day science wins out over economics and old-fashioned beliefs about animals' supposed lack of sentient capacity? Do we really want to build the world to come with the prospect of inflicting suffering and all the consequences that modern mass breeding will bring with it? Because, after all, we have to remember that not only do we contribute to the torture of animals, but also to the emission of a macabre amount of pollution due to the chemicals and antibiotics used in farming, but we also affect the quality of the meat we eat (it is hard to demand that meat from a stressed and unhappy animal should be of satisfactory quality, because it involves a series of chemical reactions taking place in the body and affecting it).

According to the party, Poland has become "the moral dustbin of Europe" on animal issues; PPOZ wants to cooperate with other pro-animal groups in order to secure the right to life and well-being of animals, criticising the current animal protection in Poland as insufficient and appallingly low. The party condemns the pervasive lobbying of meat industry, highlighting that "pro-animal bills do not even reach the parliamentary drafting stage, because they are effectively fought against by the lobby of fur farmers, industrial meat producers and hunters". The party believes that sjncdy "treating a horse as a friend rather than an object has historical roots in Poland", this kind of care should be extended to other animals as well, instead of drawing arbitrary line between "a friend or food".

The party is particularly critical of hunting, which it calls "completely ill-considered venture, consisting more of a kind of violent fun and drunkenness rather than controlling the population in a wise and informed way". The party highlights the high-profile case of wild boar culling in Poland, which indiscriminately killed both strong and weak, as well as pregnant boars. PPOZ argues that hunting fails to stimulate natural selection as only the strongest and largest animals are being hunted down, thus weakening the genetical strength of species instead of improving it. It also states that "consumerism is the parent of cruelty" and wants to end animal slaughter, which it forces to slavery and concentration camps; according to PPOZ, by eating meat one not only contributes to torture of fellow sentient beings, but also to the "emission of a macabre amount of pollution caused by the chemicals and antibiotics".

However, the party also believes that a change is a cultural process, not a simple legal imperative. To this end, in addition to legislative initiatives, the party postulates referendum actions and organisational activities, as well as events that will promote awareness of particularly common animal rights violations in Poland. The PPOZ argues that the Polish climate and energy policies need to be thoroughly reformed, stating that renewable and green energies are being displaced by coal, further contributing to Polish pollution. The party demands a policy that will maximise the common good and sharply reduce carbon dioxide emissions.

In its program, the party highlights six main points:

- Stop chaining dogs;
- Stop animal slaughter;
- Ban hunting;
- Protection of endangered and dying species;
- Decisive climate policy, replacing coal with green energy;
- Ban animal use in circuses and laboratories.

== See also ==
- Party for the Animals
- The Greens (Poland)
- V-Partei3
- Human Environment Animal Protection Party
