= Nida, Świętokrzyskie Voivodeship =

Nida
- Village
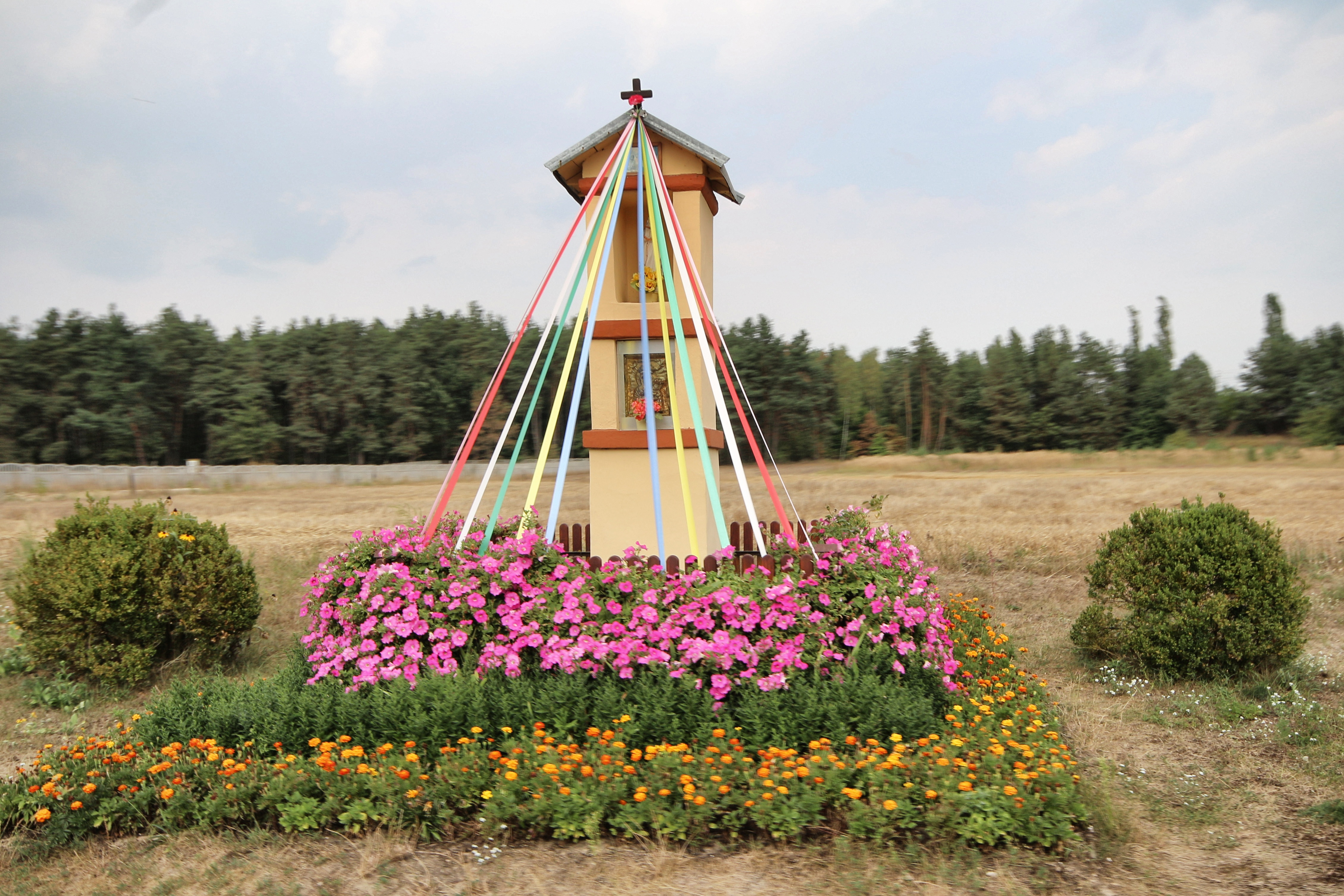
- Wayside shrine

- Location within Poland
- Coordinates: 50°45′23″N 20°33′19″E
- Country: Poland
- Voivodeship: Świętokrzyskie
- County: Kielce
- Gmina: Morawica
- Population: 440
- Time zone: UTC+1 (CET)
  - Summer (DST): UTC+2 (CEST)
- Vehicle registration: TKI

Nida [ˈnida] is a village in the administrative district of Gmina Morawica, within Kielce County, Świętokrzyskie Voivodeship, in south-central Poland. It lies approximately 6 km (4 mi) west of Morawica and 15 km (9 mi) south of the regional capital Kielce.
