= Zbrza, Kielce County =

Zbrza
- Village
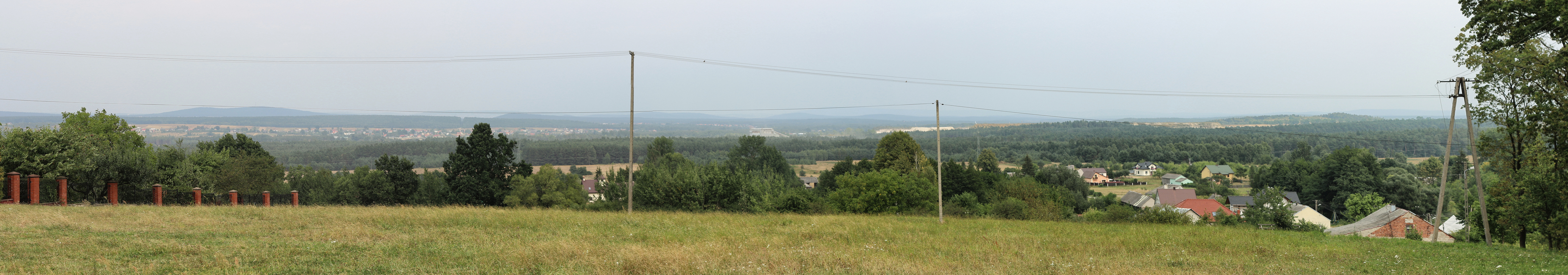

- Location within Poland
- Coordinates: 50°43′52″N 20°34′23″E
- Country: Poland
- Voivodeship: Świętokrzyskie
- County: Kielce
- Gmina: Morawica
- Population: 340

Zbrza [zbʐa] is a village in the administrative district of Gmina Morawica, within Kielce County, Świętokrzyskie Voivodeship, in south-central Poland. It lies approximately 4 km (2 mi) west of Morawica and 18 km (11 mi) south of the regional capital Kielce.
