= Bilcza, Kielce County =

Bilcza
- Village
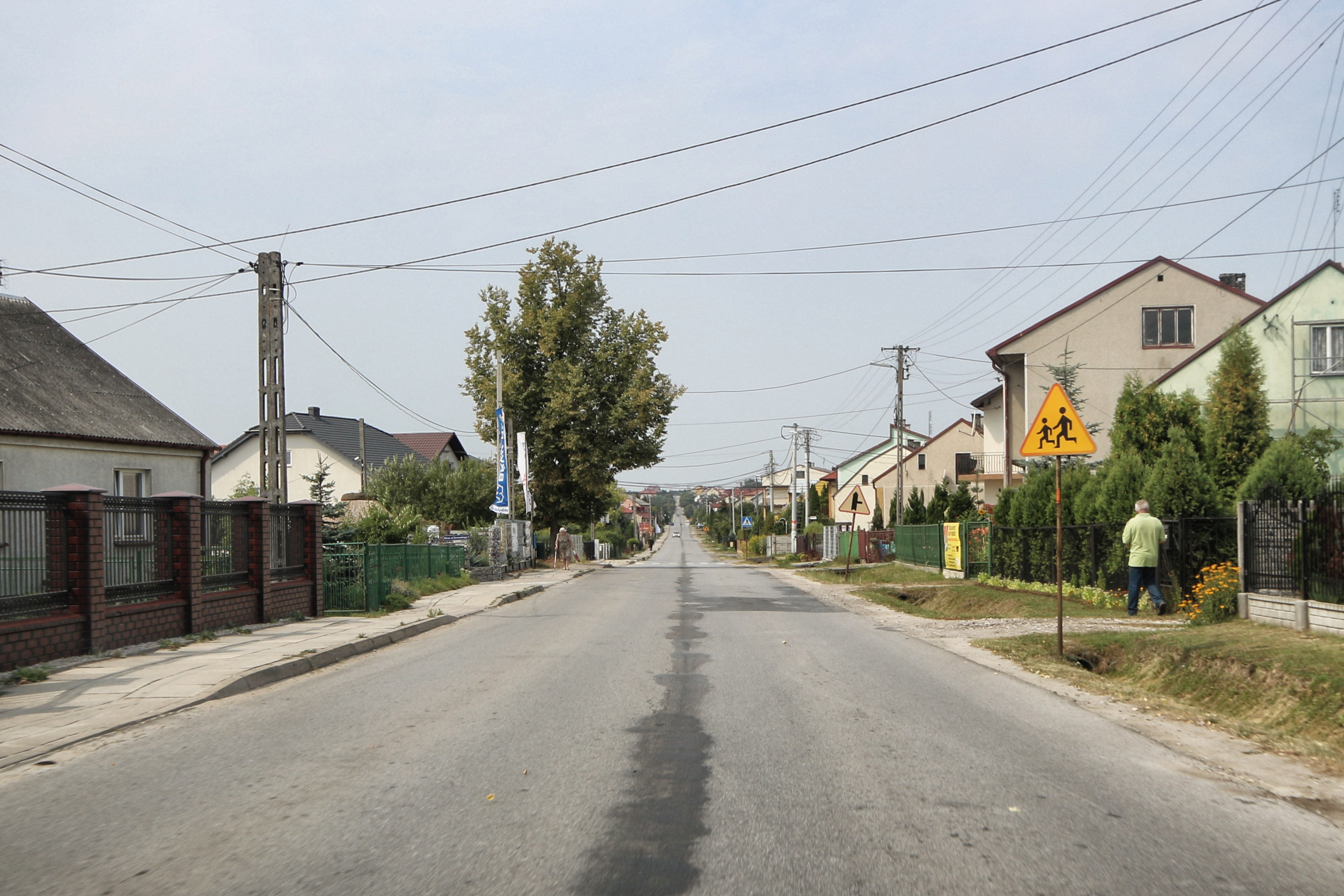

- Location within Poland
- Coordinates: 50°46′53″N 20°37′16″E
- Country: Poland
- Voivodeship: Świętokrzyskie
- County: Kielce
- Gmina: Morawica
- Population: 2,292
- Website: http://www.bilcza.eu/

Bilcza [ˈbilt͡ʂa] is a village in the administrative district of Gmina Morawica, within Kielce County, Świętokrzyskie Voivodeship, in south-central Poland. It lies approximately 5 km (3 mi) north of Morawica and 12 km (7 mi) south of the regional capital Kielce.
