= Kawczyn, Świętokrzyskie Voivodeship =

Kawczyn
- Village
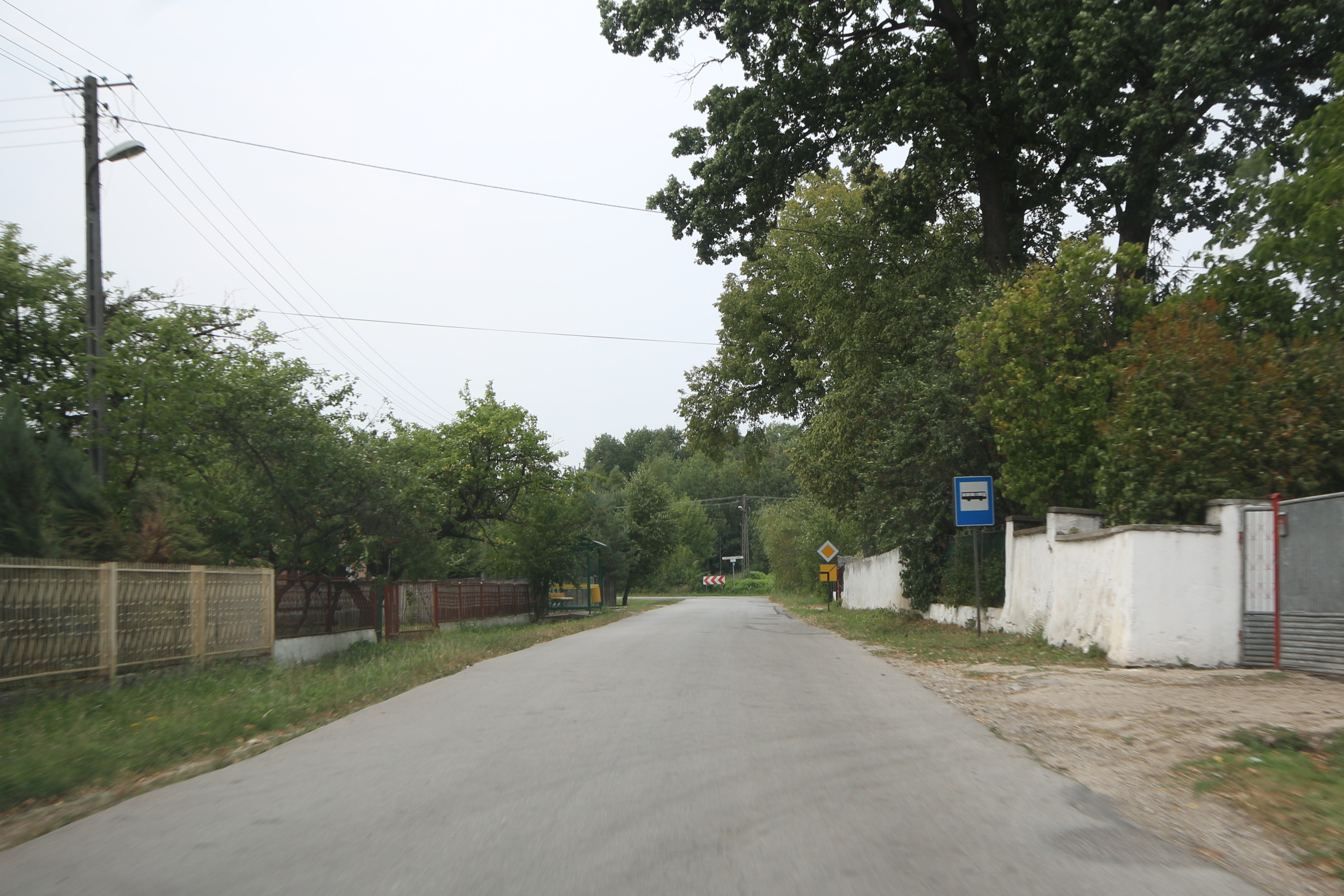

- Location within Poland
- Coordinates: 50°42′38″N 20°34′21″E
- Country: Poland
- Voivodeship: Świętokrzyskie
- County: Kielce
- Gmina: Morawica
- Population: 140

Kawczyn [ˈkaft͡ʂɨn] is a village in the administrative district of Gmina Morawica, within Kielce County, Świętokrzyskie Voivodeship, in south-central Poland. It lies approximately 6 km (4 mi) south-west of Morawica and 20 km (12 mi) south of the regional capital Kielce.
