= Chmielowice, Świętokrzyskie Voivodeship =

Chmielowice
- Village
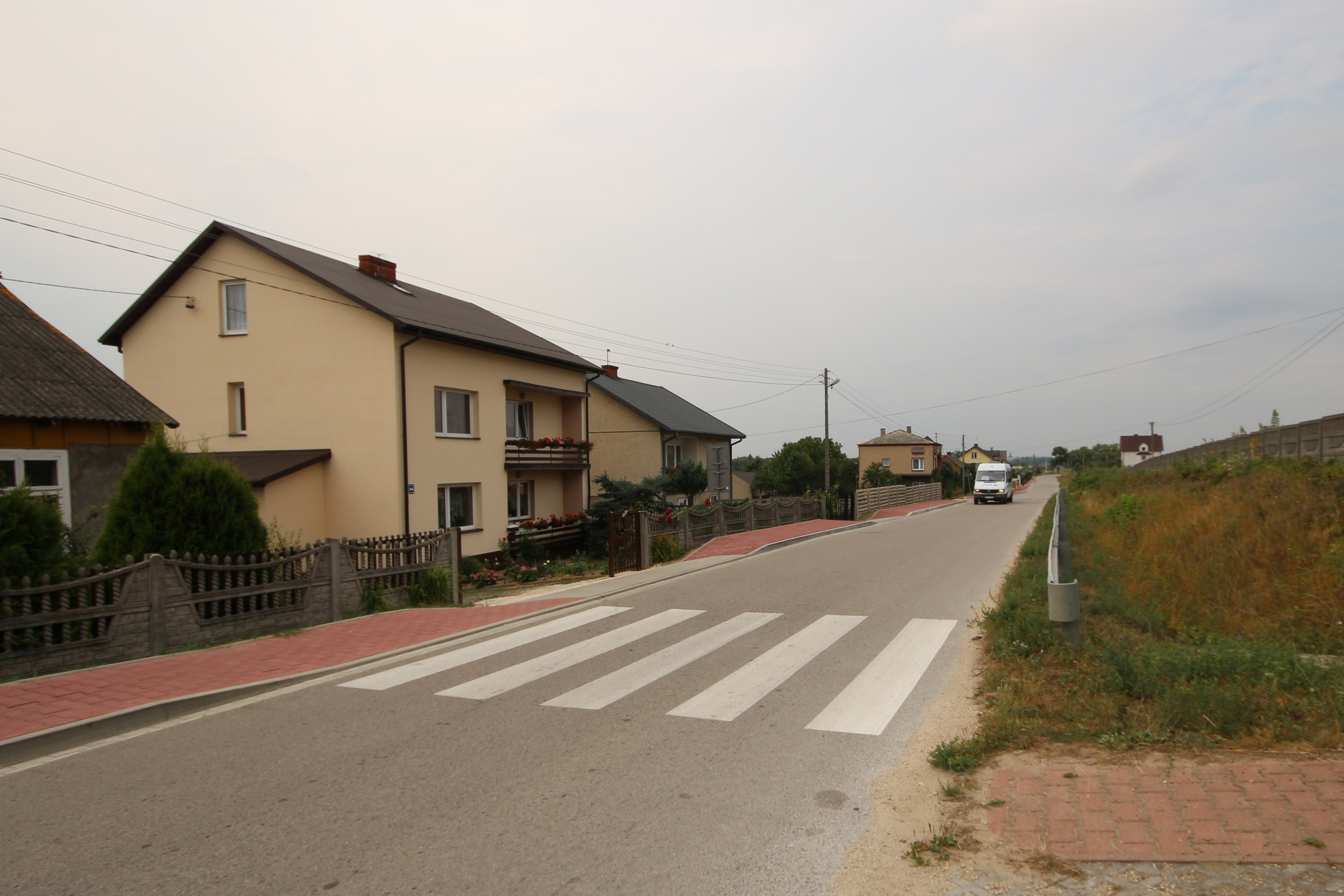

- Location within Poland
- Coordinates: 50°42′30″N 20°33′14″E
- Country: Poland
- Voivodeship: Świętokrzyskie
- County: Kielce
- Gmina: Morawica
- Population: 310

Chmielowice [xmjɛlɔˈvit͡sɛ] is a village in the administrative district of Gmina Morawica, within Kielce County, Świętokrzyskie Voivodeship, in south-central Poland. It lies approximately 7 km (4 mi) south-west of Morawica and 20 km (12 mi) south of the regional capital Kielce.
