= List of animal advocacy parties =

In the early 21st century, several political parties were founded that have as their main goal the improvement of animal welfare and the recognition of animal rights:

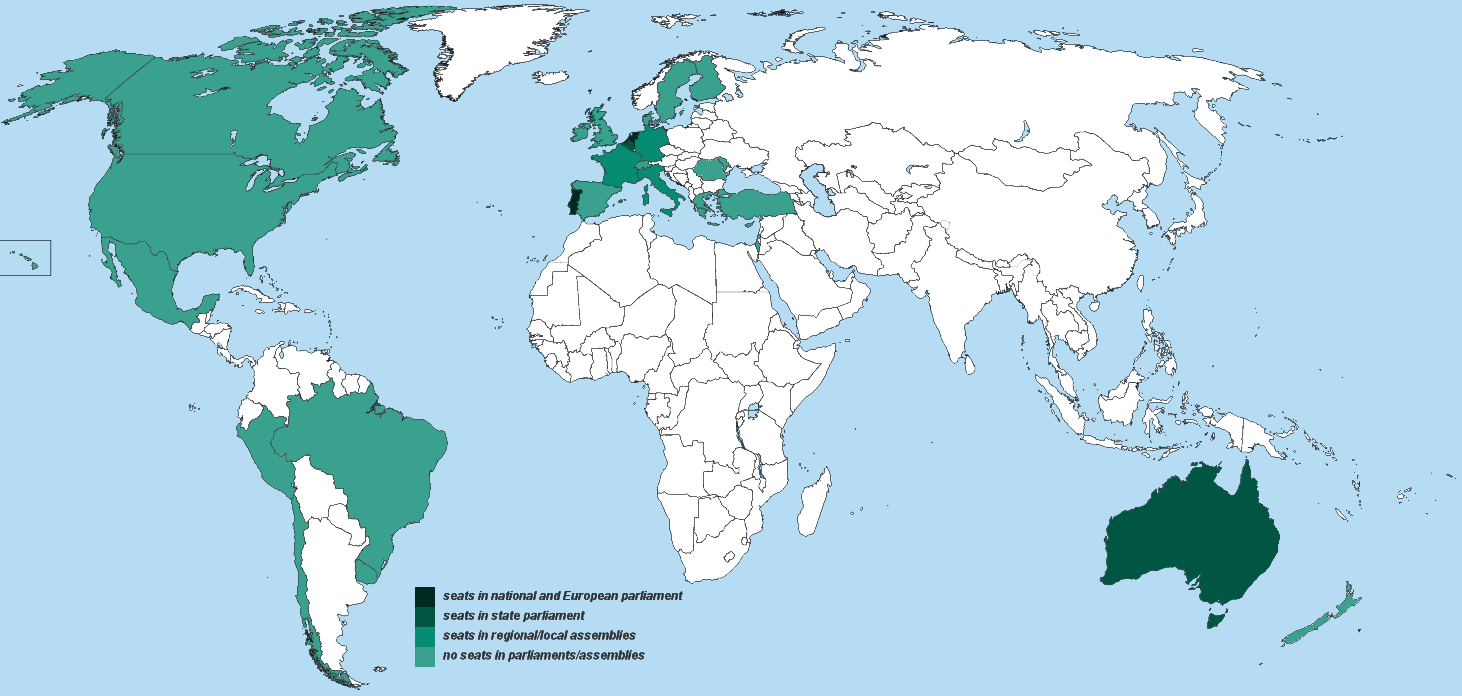
Countries with existing animal welfare parties

Name	Active	Region served	Notes
Prohibition Party	1869–	United States	Opposes animal cruelty, specifically advocating against animal testing, cock- and dog-fighting and bear baiting.
Human Environment Animal Protection Party (German: Partei Mensch Umwelt Tierschutz)	1993–	Germany; EU	In short: Tierschutzpartei. Represented in the European Parliament with 1 seat.
Party for the Animals (Dutch: Partij voor de Dieren)	2002–	Netherlands; EU	Represented in the Dutch Parliament with 3 seats from 2023. Represented in the European Parliament with 1 seat from 2024.
Animalist Party with the Environment (Spanish: PACMA)	2003–	Spain; EU	Founded as Partido Antitaurino Contra el Maltrato Animal in 2003. Renamed to Partido Animalista Contra el Maltrato Animal in 2011 and to Partido Animalista Con el Medio Ambiente in 2022.
Animal Protection Party of Canada	2005–	Canada	Original name: Animal Alliance Environment Voters Party of Canada.
Animal Welfare Party	2006–	United Kingdom; EU (2006–20)	
Italian Animalist Party (Italian: Partito Animalista Italiano)	2006–	Italy; EU	
Democratic Party of Greens - FOR ANIMAL RIGHTS (Czech: Demokratická strana zelených - ZA PRÁVA ZVÍŘAT)	2009–	Czech Republic; EU	The party added the slogan "FOR ANIMAL RIGHTS" to its name in 2019
Humane Party	2009–	United States	
People-Animals-Nature (PAN) (Portuguese: Pessoas-Animais-Natureza)	2009–	Portugal; EU	Founded as Party for Animals and Nature. Represented in parliament with 4 seats from 2019. Represented in the European Parliament with 1 seat 2019–2020.
Tier im Fokus	2009–	Switzerland; Council of Europe	Represented in the legislative City Council of Berne with 1 seat from 2024.
Animal Justice Party	2010–	Australia	Represented in the NSW Legislative Council with 2 seats from 2019. Represented in the Victorian Legislative Council with 1 seat (2018).
Animal Party Switzerland (German: Tierpartei Schweiz; French: Parti suisse pour les animaux Italian: Partit svizzero per gli animali)	2010–	Switzerland; Council of Europe	
Animal Party (Turkey) (Turkish: Hayvan Partisi)	2011–	Turkey; Council of Europe	
Polish_Party_of_Animal_Protection (Polish: Polska Partia Ochrony Zwierząt)	2011–	Poland; EU	
Animal Party of Chile (Spanish: Partido Animalista de Chile)	2012–	Chile	
Animal Party (Greek: Κόμμα για τα Ζώα Κύπρου)	2014–	Cyprus; EU	
Animals' Party (Swedish: Djurens parti)	2014–	Sweden; EU	
Animal Politics EU (European political party)	2014–	European Union	Named Euro Animal 7 from 2014 to 2019. Group of 11 parties. Represented in the European Parliament with 3 seats 2019–2020.
Animal Justice Party of Finland (Finnish: Eläinoikeuspuolue)	2015–	Finland; EU	
Animalist Party (French: Parti animaliste)	2016–	France; EU	
Justice for All Party (Hebrew: מפלגת צדק לכל)	2016–	Israel	
V-Partei³ ("Party for Change, Vegetarians and Vegans") (German: Partei für Veränderung, Vegetarier und Veganer)	2016–	Germany; EU	
Animalist Movement (Italian: Movimento Animalista)	2017–	Italy; EU	
DierAnimal	2018–	Belgium; EU	
Ecological Revolution for the Living	2018–	France; EU	Represented in parliament with 1 seat from 2022.
Green Animal Party of Uruguay (Spanish: Partido Verde Animalista)	2018–	Uruguay	
Party for Animal Welfare (PAW)	2018–	Ireland; EU	
Animalism Party (Japanese: アニマリズム党)	2019-	Japan	Founded on November 1st, World Vegan Day.
Animal Party (Greece) (Greek: Κόμμα για τα Ζώα)	2020–	Greece; EU	
Animal Justice Party Aotearoa New Zealand	2022–	New Zealand	
Movement for the Animals (Croatian: Pokret za životinje)	2022–	Croatia; EU	
Animalist and Environmental Party of Colombia (Spanish: Partido Animalista y Ambientalista de Colombia)	2025–	Colombia	

Parties that are no longer active

Name	Active	Region served	Notes
Party for the Animals (Dutch: Partij voor de Dieren)	2004–2019	Belgium; EU	Merged into Vlaams Belang in 2019.
Animal Protection Party	2008–2016	United Kingdom; EU	
Union of the Environmentalist Animalist Party (Spanish: Unión Partido Animalista Ambientalista)	2016–?	Argentina	inactive
Animal Party of Brazil (Portuguese: Partido Animais)	2016–?	Brazil	inactive
Fokus	2010–2015	Denmark; EU	Splinter group from the Danish People's Party.
Trees Party	2014–2020	Taiwan	
Vegan Party (Danish: Veganerpartiet)	2018–2022	Denmark; EU	Merged into The Alternative in 2022.

== See also ==
- List of animal rights advocates
- List of animal rights groups
- American Vegetarian Party
