= Morawica, Świętokrzyskie Voivodeship =

Morawica
- Town
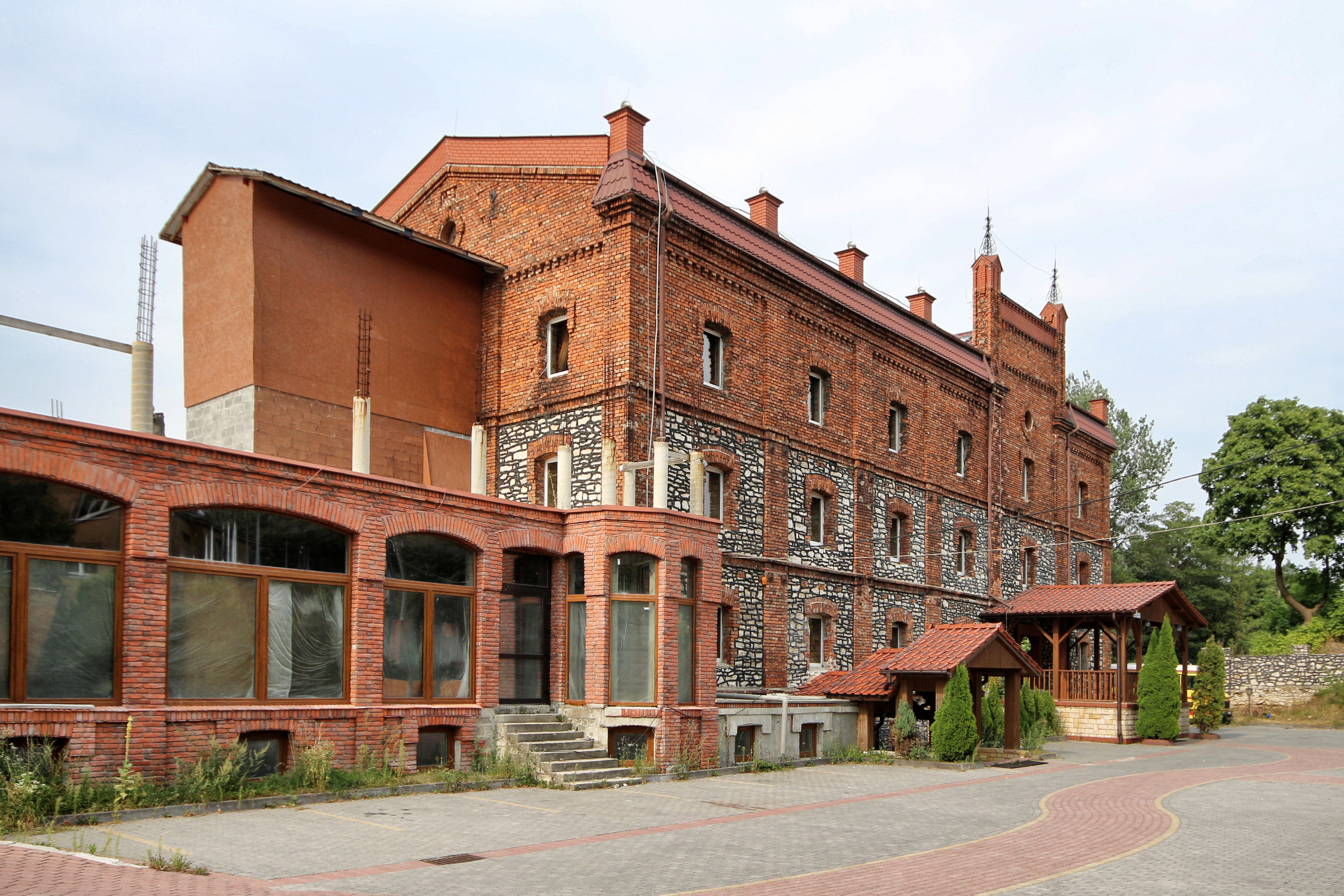
- Former mill in Morawica

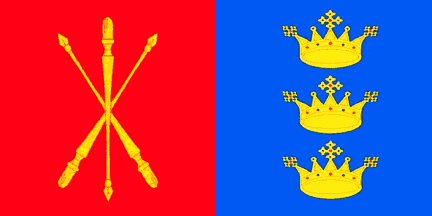
- Flag Coat of arms

- Location within Poland
- Coordinates: 50°44′28″N 20°37′36″E
- Country: Poland
- Voivodeship: Świętokrzyskie
- County: Kielce
- Gmina: Morawica

Population
  - Total: 1,699
- Time zone: UTC+1 (CET)
  - Summer (DST): UTC+2 (CEST)
- Vehicle registration: TKI
- Website: http://morawica.pl/

Morawica [mɔraˈvit͡sa] is a town in Kielce County, Świętokrzyskie Voivodeship, in south-central Poland. It is the seat of the gmina (administrative district) called Gmina Morawica. It lies approximately 16 km (10 mi) south of the regional capital Kielce.

According to the 1921 census, the population was 91.8% ethnically Polish and 8.2% Jewish.

== Transport ==
National road 73 bypasses Morawica to the east.

National road 73 connects Morawica to Kielce to the north and to Busko-Zdrój to the south.

Voivodeship roads 766 and 763 also meet in the town.

The nearest railway station is in Nida.
