= Dano-Swedish War (1813–1814) order of battle =

Order of battle

This is a list of the order of battle for the Dano-Swedish War (1813–1814) between the Sixth coalition (mainly Sweden and Russia) and Denmark–Norway and France, between 1813–1814.

== Danish Auxiliary Corps ==
The Danish Auxiliary Corps consisted of one vanguard and two brigades, directed by Commander-in-chief, Frederik of Hesse. Other notable people include Chief of Staff, Jens Carl Bardenfleth, Deputy Chief, Frederik Løvenørn Barden, and captains such as Frederik Emil Scholten, Malthe Friis, Frederik Krohn and Christian Michaelsen.

=== Vanguard ===
The vanguard was initially commanded by Samuel Waldeck, however, quickly substituted by the French Charles l'Allemand. The vanguard consisted of:

- Schleswig Jaeger Corps II (Lieutenant Colonel L.J. Wasmer) (Note: soon detached for guard duty in Travemünde, but returned in December 1813.)
- Holsteinian Sharpshooter Corps I (Lieutenant Colonel J. Leschley)
- Holsteinian Sharpshooter Corps II (Major C.F.V. Wilcken)
- Hussar Regiment 2nd Squadron (Major C.L. Späth)
- Hussar Regiment 6th Squadron (Major E.L. Berger)
- 3-pdr Mounted Battery (Captain G.A.N. Gerstenberg)

=== 1st Brigade ===
The 1st Brigade was commanded by G.L. Count of Schulenburg and consisted of:

- Oldenburg Infantry Regiment I (Colonel C.F. Abercron)
- Oldenburg Infantry Regiment II (Lieutenant Colonel A.N. Brackel)
- Oldenburg Infantry Regiment IV (Major P.U. Scharffenberg)
- Oldenburg Infantry Regiment III Jaeger company (Captain F. Schou)
- Holsteinian Infantry Regiment IV (Major C.F.W. Lejonstjerna)
- Queen's Life Regiment I (Colonel F.E.H. Cronhelm)
- Queen's Life Regiment II Jaeger company (Captain Flitner)
- Holsteinian Cavalry Regiment (Lieutenant Colonel J.C. Harboe)
- 6-pdr Foot Battery (Captain F.V.P.G. Koye) (Note: Received 6 French 6-pdr guns M1808 and 2 24-pdr howitzers instead of 8 3-pdr guns.)

=== 2nd Brigade ===
The 2nd Brigade was commanded by Chief J.C. Lasson and consisted of:

- Funen Infantry Regiment I (Colonel F.J.C. Castonier)
- Funen Infantry Regiment II (Major G.E. Michaelsen)
- Schleswig Infantry Regiment I (Lieutenant Colonel E.V.L. Schaumberg)
- Schleswig Infantry Regiment II (Lieutenant Colonel N.P.S. Schreibvogel)
- Holsteinian Infantry Regiment III (Lieutenant Colonel F.P.V. Moltke)
- Jutish Regiment light Dragoons (Colonel N. Engelsted) (Note: Exchanged with 2nd and 3rd Squadrons of the 17th Lithuanian Uhlans, and served as French Division Cavalry until December 1813.)
- 3-pdr Mounted Battery (Captain V.C. Gønner)
- 6-pdr Foot Battery (Captain G. Blicher)

Later added companies and regiments:

- Funen Regiment light Dragoons (Captain C.F. Kirchheiner)
- Schleswig Infantry Regiment III, Light company (Captain A. Mushardt)
- Altona Jaeger Grenadier Company (Captain C.A. Rathlev)
- French/Danish combined artillery detachment (Captain Krabbe)
- Duchess Louise Augustas Life Jaeger Corps (First Lieutenant J.J.J Wernich)
- 17th Lithuanian Uhlan Regiment (Colonel Brezchff)
- 1st Trondheim Infantry Regiment

== Army of the North ==
The Allied Army of the North was commanded by the Swedish crown prince, Charles John with other notable commanders such as General Major Wilhelm von Dörnberg, Field marshal Curt von Stedingk, General Lieutenant Ludwig von Wallmoden-Gimborn and General Lieutenant Eberhard von Vegesack. The army consisted of a mixed Swedish-Mecklenburg corps, divisions from the Russian–German Legion and the King's German Legion, pure Swedish and Russian corps, and additional Hanseatic and Cossack brigades.

=== Swedish-Mecklenburg Corps ===
The Swedish-Mecklenburg Corps was commanded by Count Wallmoden and made up of a Swedish corps and a Mecklenburgish brigade of. The Swedish Corps was led Vegesack and consisted of:

- 5th Swedish Corps (Colonel Bergenstrale)
- Smaland Infantry Regiment I
- Jönköping Infantry Regiment II
- South Scanian Regiment I
- King's Infantry Regiment I
- Mörner Hussar Regiment I
- Scanian Karabinier Regiment IV
- 2 Batteries from the Wendes Regiment (Major Elfving)

The Mecklenburgish Brigade was commanded by General Major Vallois and consisted of:

- Mecklenburg Grenadier Battalion I
- Mecklenburg Infantry Regiment II
- Mecklenburg Foot Jägers I
- 4 Mecklenburg Mounted Jäger Squadrons
- Hussar Regiment von Schill
- Mecklenburg Artillery

=== Hanseatic Legion ===
A Hanseatic brigade was additionally attached to the Army of the North, commanded by Karl Friedrich von Witzleben. It was made up by voulenteers from the Hanseatic cities of Lübeck, Hamburg and Bremen and consisted of:

- Hamburg Battalion
- Lübeck Battalion
- Hamburg Burgergarde
- Hanseatic Cavalry Regiment
- Hanseatic Foot Battery

=== Russo–German Legion ===
The Russian–German Legion was commanded by General Lieutenant Wilhelm von Arentschildt and consisted of:

- 1st Battalion Russo-German Legion (1st Brigade, Major von Natzmer)
- 2nd Battalion Russo-German Legion
- 5th Battalion Russo-German Legion
- 3rd Battalion Russo-German Legion (2nd Brigade, Oberstleutnant Wardenburg)
- 4th Battalion Russo-German Legion
- 6th Battalion Russo-German Legion
- 7th Battalion Russo-German Legion
- RGL Foot Battery

=== King's German Legion ===
The British contributed with the King's German Legion, which were made up of Hanoverian refugees, educated in Britain. It consisted of:

- Anhalt-Dessau Battalion I
- Lüneburg Battalion I
- Bremen-Verden Battalion I
- Lauenberg Battalion I
- Bennigsen Battalion I
- Langrehr Battalion I
- Wiering Hanoverian Foot Battery
- Holtzermann KGL Half Battalion
- Kielmannseggs Jägerkorps
- Russo-German Legion Jäger Company I

=== Cavalry Division ===
The Cavalry Division was led by Wilhelm von Dörnberg and divided into:

- 1st Hussar Regiment Russo-German Legion IV
- 2nd Hussar Regiment Russo-German Legion IV
- 3rd King's German Legion Hussar Regiment V
- Lüneburg Hussar Regiment III
- Bremen-Verden Hussar Regiment III
- RGL Artillery Brigade
- KGL Artillery Brigade

=== Swedish Corps ===
The 24,000 Swedes, in which a most served in the pure Swedish Corps, was commanded by Curt von Stedingk and made up of five brigades and three divisions.

==== 1st Division ====
The first division was commanded by Generalmajor von Posse and consisted of:

- Svea Guard Infantry Regiment I
- 2nd Guard Infantry Regiment I
- Queen's Infantry Regiment I
- Grenadiers of the Guard Brigade I
- Leib-Grenadier Regiment II
- Uppland Infantry Regiment II
- Söndermanland Infantry Regiment II
- North Scanian Infantry Regiment
- Pommeranian Foot Legion
- 2 6pdr Horse Batteries, Gotha Regiment

==== 2nd Division ====
The Second Division was commanded by General Lieutenant Saandels and consisted of:

- Westgöta Infantry Regiment II
- Närke-Värmland Regiment II
- Västmanland Regiment III
- Skaraborg Infantry Regiment II
- Älvsborg Infantry Regiment II
- Wermland Jäger Regiment I
- Kronoberg Infantry Regiment II
- Engelbrecht Infantry Regiment I
- Kalmar Infantry Regiment II
- 2 6pdr Horse Batteries, Wendes Regiment

==== Cavalry Division ====
A cavalry division was also set up, commanded by General Lieutenant Anders Skjöldebrand. It consisted of:

- Guard Brigade Cuirassier Regiment IV
- Smaland Dragoon Regiment VI
- Scanian Hussar Regiment VI
- Mörner Regiment V
- Pommeranian Horse Legion I
- 12pdr Foot Battery, Wendes Regiment
- 6pdr Horse Battery, Svea Regiment

=== 1st Russian Corps ===
The Army of the North also included a 9.000 men Russian Corps led by Count Vorontsov. It consisted of an infantry division led by Generalmajor von Harpe and was made up by:

- 13th Jager Regiment II
- 14th Jager Regiment II
- Navaguinsk Infantry Regiment II
- Converged Grenadiers 9th Division I
- Converged Grenadiers 15th Division I
- Converged Grenadiers 18th Division I
- Lützow Free Corps

A cavalry brigade was also attached to the Russian Corps. It was commanded by Generalmajor Baron Pahlen and consisted of two regiments:

- Isoum Hussar Regiment IV
- Riga Dragoon Regiment IV

Additionally, a cossack brigade commanded by Colonel von Löwenstern was included in the Russian Corps, and consisted of three regiments:

- Popov 13th Cossack Regiment
- Pantelev 2nd Cossack Regiment
- Tver Opolochenie Cossack Regiment

The artillery was directed by Colonel Winzper and consisted of:

- Position Battery
- Light Battery
- Horse Battery

Another independent Russian cossack brigade was led by Generalmajor von Tettenborn and consisted of:

- Denisov 7th Cossack Regiment
- Sulima 9th Cossack Regiment
- Grebov 2nd Cossack Regiment
- Komissarov #1 Cossack Regiment
- Nieroth Free Detachment

=== 2nd Russian Corps ===
A second Russian Army Corps led by General Lieutenant Pavel Alexandrovich Stroganov included the 12th and 13th Infantry Division of the Russian empire. The 12th Infantry Division consisted of:

- Smolensk Infantry Regiment II
- Narva Infantry Regiment II
- Alexopol Infantry Regiment II
- New Ingremannland Infantry Regiment II
- 6th Jager Regiment II
- Saratov Infantry Regiment
- Pensa Infantry Regiment II

The artillery consisted of:

- Horse Battery
- Light Battery
- Light Battery

Attached companies:

- 9th Bashkir Regiment
- 11th Bashkir Regiment

== See also ==
- Order of battle of the French invasion of Russia
- List of orders of battle

== Works cited ==
- Wolter, Hans (2016). Danish Infantry of the Line and Light Infantry 1803-1814 (PDF). Chakoten.
- Wadskjær, Sune Nielsen (2020). Rædselstiden Napoleon modstandere angriber Danmark i december 1813.
- Petersen, J. (1978). 3 betydningsfulde slag ved Bornhöved. Krigsvidenskab.dk.
