= Dano-Swedish War (1813–1814) =

1813–1814 war between Denmark-Norway and Sweden

Dano-Swedish War of 1813–1814
- Part of the War of the Sixth Coalition and a series of Dano-Swedish wars
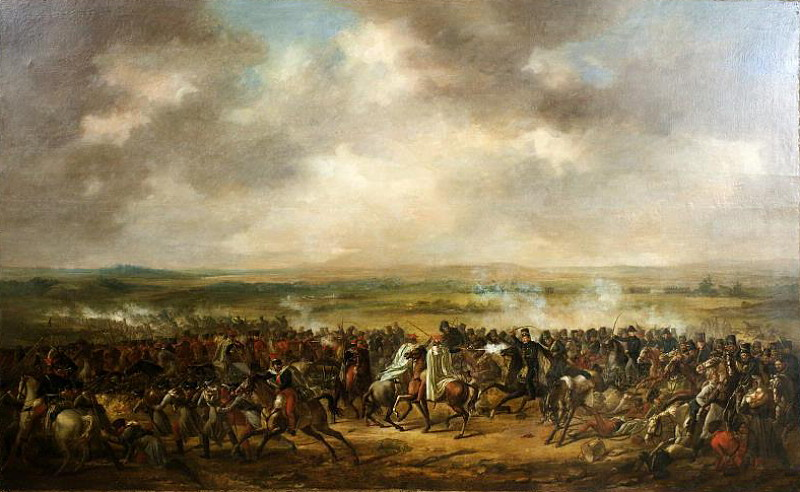
- Battle of Bornhöved by Per Krafft the Younger
| Date | 1 December 1813 – 16 January 1814 |
| Location | Duchy of Schleswig, Duchy of Holstein |
| Result | Coalition victory (Treaty of Kiel) |
| Territorial changes | Norway ceded to Sweden; Swedish Pomerania ceded to Denmark (Note: Traded for the Duchy of Launberg in the Congress of Vienna) |

Belligerents
| Sweden; Russian Empire; United Kingdom; Prussia; Hanover (Grand Duchy of Mecklenburg-Schwerin) Mecklenburg-Schwerin; Anhalt-Dessau; Bremen-Verden | Denmark-Norway; Supported by: (First French Empire) French Empire |

Commanders and leaders
| (Sweden) Charles XIV John (Sweden) Anders Skjöldebrand (Sweden) Bror Cederström (Russian Empire) Ludwig Wallmoden (Russian Empire) Friedrich Tettenborn (United Kingdom of Great Britain and Ireland) Arthur Farquhar | (Denmark–Norway) Frederik VI (Denmark–Norway) Frederik of Hesse (Denmark–Norway) Graf Schulenburg (First French Empire) François Lallemand (First French Empire) General Lasson |

Units involved
| See Order of Battle | See Order of Battle |

Strength
| 43,000–65,000 men | 10,200–12,500 men |

Casualties and losses
| Unknown | Unknown |

The Dano-Swedish War of 1813–1814 also referred to as Charles John's campaign against Denmark, or as the War for Norway (Danish: Kampen om Norge) was the Coalition campaign against Denmark-Norway led by the Swedish crown prince Charles John, and it was the last major conflict between Denmark and Sweden. The war was a part of Sweden's campaign against the French Empire, who after defeating the French at The Battle of the Nations turned its attention to Napoleon's last ally Denmark–Norway. Denmark was invaded through its German duchies, which later became occupied. In the peace treaty Denmark was forced to give Norway to Sweden, ending the 400-year personal union between them.

== Background ==
The Dano-Swedish War of 1808–1809 ended indecisively. The Swedish invasion of Norway failed, partly due to the harsh Norwegian weather, but also in part due to its war with Russia. In the peace negotiations following the war, Russian diplomats pointed to Norway as being an “obvious territorial compensation” for Finland. Although Denmark and Russia had an alliance, it was becoming clear that Denmark was more dependent on Russia than Russia was on Denmark. The war with Russia meant that Sweden did not have its strong infantry, but the Swedish crown prince did manage to replace the fallen with new and educated soldiers.

The last Dano-Swedish war had proven to Charles John that, if he wanted Norway, he would need a new strategy. He first proposed an invasion of Zealand, but his coalition allies suggested instead to exploit Napoleon's defeat in Russia. The plan instead became to fight Napoleon on the European continent (specifically in Germany), then march through Denmark-Norway’s German duchies, thereby pressuring Frederick VI of Denmark to cede Norway. The idea was to try to establish a good relationship with the Norwegians, as well as avoiding a Norwegian front. When Denmark found out about this, it sent the Danish crown prince to Norway, both to secure the Norwegians loyalty, but also to prepare him to take the throne.

Denmark-Norway's military was under strain during the later half of the Napoleonic Wars. For the last six years it had been at war with the United Kingdom, after which they couldn’t exert its naval power, since it was captured in the Gunboat War. The Danish army on the other hand had barely lost any troops in the Napoleonic Wars, and it was fairly strong when it was deployed to Northern Germany in 1813. The Danish army was made up of veterans and physically strong and military educated men.

=== Foreign support ===
Denmark was by 1812 allied with Napoleon, and the Danish king Frederik VI had signed a secret defense agreement with France at Fontainebleau, in which he put 10,000 soldiers at his disposal. The treaty was never honored, however.

France had begun retreating from Russia in 1812, and Russia was now on a march through Central Europe and thus wanted allies. Russia proposed that Denmark join the coalition. In compensation for Norway, Denmark would get Lübeck, Hamburg, Bremen, the German north coast, and the Netherlands. This proposal would’ve made Denmark into a Great power, and was likely offered because Austria too was seeking new allies to become the leading power in the coalition. Frederik VI refused the proposal however, and maintained its alliance with France in hopes of maintaining national integrity.

Denmark-Norway and France were still allies by the start of 1813, and when a rebellion in French-occupied Hamburg took place during late February, Danish troops were called upon to quell it. They captured the leaders, and the French executed them. This proved to the Russian government that Frederik VI would remain Napoleon's ally.

The Coalition powers sought instead to seek Sweden's help in defeating Napoleon, which Charles John was willing to provide in return for support in conquering Norway. Sweden and the United Kingdom signed a treaty in March, in which Sweden promised to contribute 30,000 men to the campaign against Napoleon, and the UK promised to aid Sweden with subsidies for an invasion of Norway. Later in April, they concluded a treaty with Prussia, in which Prussia promised to send a corps of 27,000 men to fight alongside the Swedish army, as well as promising, under certain conditions, to contribute troops to the subjugation of Norway.

== War ==
Battles

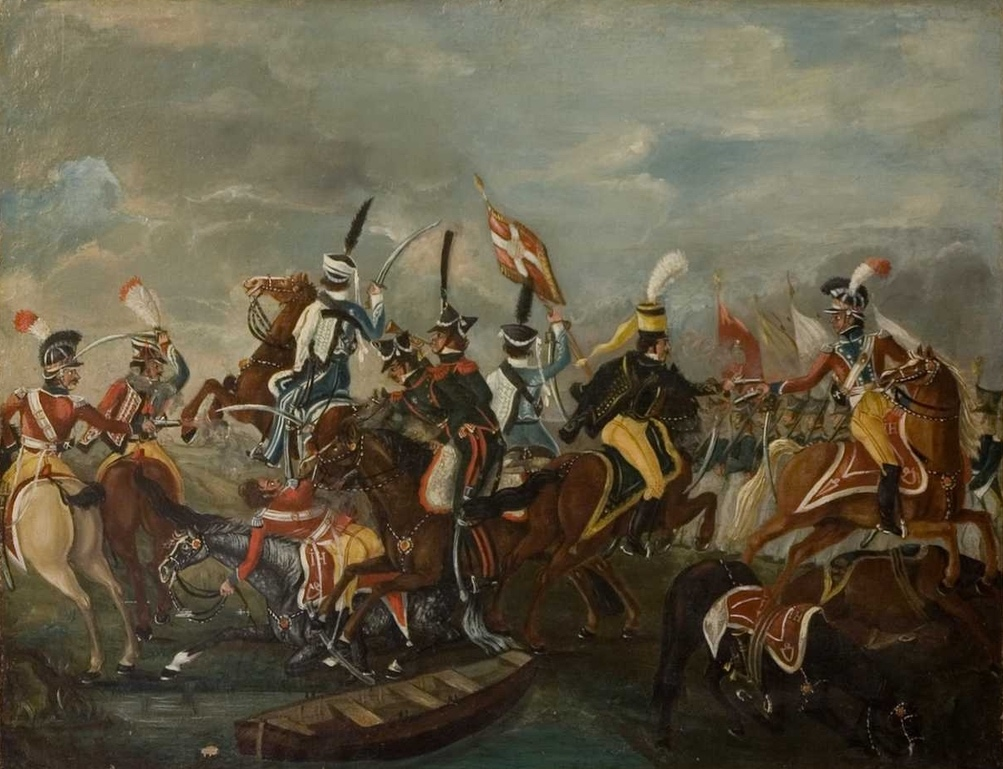
Battle of Bornhöved (1813)

Battle of Sehested

Swedish Crown Prince Charles John had left Sweden and assembled an army of 50,000 troops to invade Denmark over the Elbe through Holstein, and with that conquer the last ally of Napoleon. He faced a smaller force commanded by Prince Frederik of Hesse, that had taken defensive positions near Oldesloe as well as a combined Dano-French defense in the Stecknitz Canal. He landed in Pomerania on the 17. of May, but was informed that neither Russia nor Prussia had provided the agreed relief corps. Furthermore, the UK vetoed a separate Swedish operation on Holstein.

The Swedes crossed the Elbe the day before in Boizenburg, which at that point was fortified by French troops. The French troops decided to go to Hamburg instead of meeting the Swedes at Stecknitz. The Danish soldiers, getting news of a Swedish attack on the Stecknitz Canal, got orders to leave, too.

The Northern army first appeared French-occupied Hamburg on 6 December and surrounded the city. Yet the 40,000 French soldiers were able to defend it.

Before the Swedish Crown prince arrived, the Russian general Ludwig von Wallmoden-Gimborn engaged in a battle with the Danes at Boden. The battle pushed the Danes back to Tonnendorf. Prince Frederik of Hesse moved his troops to Segeberg on the way to Kiel. On 7 December, Danish troops under Prince Frederik of Hesse fought the Swedish troops under Anders Fredrik Skjöldebrand at Bornhöved. The Battle of Bornhöved ended inconclusively. The Danish troops secured their way to Kiel, and the Swedish troops displaced the 5000 inhabitants of the Bornhöved and set camp up there.

While the Danish army was in Kiel, they got news about the Army of the North closing in on Rendsburg. Prince Frederik decided to meet Army of the North at Rendsburg, but on the way he met Ludwig von Wallmoden-Gimborn at Sehested, with an army of about 10,000 men. The Danes won the Battle of Sehested and secured the way to Rendsburg. Deserting became a growing problem after the Battle of Bornhöved (1813) and became even greater while the Danish army was stationed at the fortified cities of Glückstadt and Rendsburg, especially from the Holsteinian regiments. It was seen as foolish by the Holsteinians to be allied with Napoleon, and the war became even more unpopular by civilians and soldiers alike.

A ceasefire was signed between the coalition and Denmark on the 15 December and lasted until the 29 December. When the ceasefire ended, a council of war was established in Amalienborg to discuss the continuation of the war. Sweden had now occupied all of Holstien, and they concluded to concentrate the remaining army in the island of Funen. Denmark sent diplomats to Kiel in the meantime to negotiate, where it was agreed to extend the ceasefire to the 6 January.

=== Occupation of Schleswig and Holstein ===
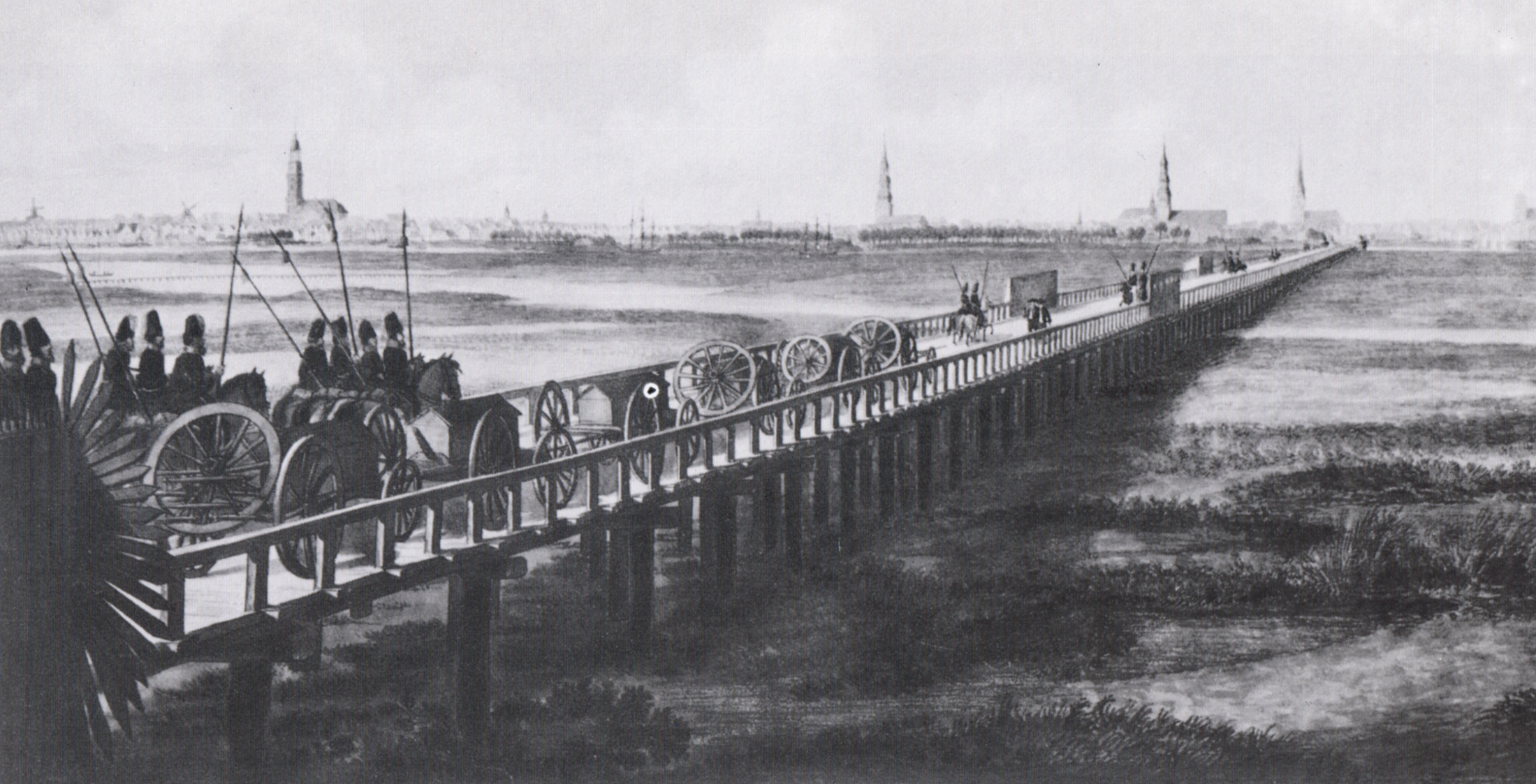
Russian troops crossing the Elbe river during the Dano-Swedish War

On December 7 and 8, 1813, Danish troops and their French allies marched through the Seekamp area, requisitioning food, horses, and wagons. These troops were pursued by Swedish hunters and hussars, some 4,000 of whom took up quarters in the Seekamp estate, plunging the area's residents into great destitution. War contributions of 2,673 Reichstaler were imposed on the Seekamp estate, but with great difficulty, only 400 Reichstaler could be raised.

When the armistice ended on 5 January 1814, a Russian Cossack army, made of about four regiments (2,000 men), led by Friedrich Karl von Tettenborn, moved up through the Ejder up to City of Schleswig on the 5–6 January, then moving to Flensburg on the 6th, Aabenraa on the 7th and Haderslev on the 8th. They were followed by Swedish cavalry. The Coalition army was so overwhelming that the local population in Schleswig and Holstein barely tried to resist the occupation. Swedish troops moved up through Schleswig-Holstein into the Danish Wahld while Russian troops (also known as Cossacks) stayed and occupied Holstein.

The occupation of Danish Wahld and the rest of Schleswig was relatively light compared to that of Holstein. The Swedes that occupied Gettorf are said to have behaved respectfully, even sharing alcohol with the priest of Gettorf. The Swedish troops also visited Gettorf after the Treaty of Kiel. The occupation of Holstein was meant to put pressure on Frederik VI of Denmark, but the king was unwilling to give up Norway. In a statement Frederik issued at Christmas time, Frederik had this to say about the occupation:

They can plunder Schleswig and Jutland; but they cannot take Norway from me if I'm unwilling to give it up.

— Frederik VI

(Note: Rough translation of: »Man kan endnu plyndre Slesvig og Jylland; men man kan ikke tage Norge fra mig, hvis jeg ikke vil bortgive det,«)

When Danish troops co-occupied Hamburg, they treated the inhabitants better than both the French and the coalition armies, which meant that the Hanseatic Legion treated the inhabitants of the Danish Dutchies much more friendly than the rest of the occupation force

A collection was arranged in May 1814 after the occupation of Schleswig and Holstein to help the locals. The whole of Denmark contributed, despite the bankruptcy. Frederik VI made a commission to determine how much the people of Schleswig and Holstein suffered. The commission put the number at 10 million rigsdaler. The population of the duchies fell with 1,000 dying as a result of the occupation. The occupation of Schleswig and Holstein is known as the Swedish winter in the Danish Wahld, referring to the Swedish troops who occupied it, and in the rest of Schleswig-Holstein it’s known as the Cossack winter, referring to the Russian troops that occupied it.

== Aftermath ==
It was when Swedish troops reached Holstein that Frederik VI agreed to peace talks. It would be concluded in Kiel, where a combined army of 8,000 Swedish, Russian and German were stationed

In the negotiations between Denmark and Britain, it was decided that Denmark-Norway was to cede the island of Heligoland to the British. In return, Britain would hand back the occupied territories of Anholt, Danish India and the Danish West Indies. Denmark also joined the Sixth Coalition and agreed send an army of 10,000 troops to be under the command of Marshall Bernadotte, for which they would receive a subsidy of 400,000 pounds.

In the negotiations between Denmark and Sweden, it was decided that Denmark would cede Norway (without its dependencies) to Sweden. In return, Denmark would gain Swedish Pomerania and Rügen – which they then traded with Prussia for the Duchy of Lauenburg in the Congress of Vienna – and an indemnity of 1 million rixdollars. The treaty of Kiel made Denmark-Norway one of the biggest territorial losers of the Napoleonic Wars, with 320.000 km being ceded.

== Bibliography ==
- Glenthøj, Rasmus; Ottosen, Morten (2014). 1814 - Danmark-Norge under Napoleonskrigene - krig, nederlag, frihed. Gads forlag.
- Barton, Sir D. Plunket (1925). Bernadotte: Prince and King 1810–1844. John Murray.
- Sørensen, Carl Theodor (1871). Kampen om Norge i årene 1813 og 1814. Bind 2: Et bidrag til de nordiske rigers krigshistorie (in Danish).
- Gravensten, Eva (2014). Det blinde skæbnespil [The blind fate game] (in Danish).
- Wolter, Hans (2016). Danish Infantry of the Line and Light Infantry 1803-1814 (PDF). Chakoten.
- Petersen, J. (1978). 3 betydningsfulde slag ved Bornhöved. Krigsvidenskab.dk.
- Wadskjær, Sune Nielsen (2020). Rædselstiden Napoleon modstandere angriber Danmark i december 1813.
- Jenssen-Tusch, Georg Friedrich (1852). Zur Regierungsgeschichte Friedrich VI. Königs von Dänemark, Herzogs von Schleswig, Holstein und Lauenburg (in German). Vol. 2. Verlag Schröder.
- Det Danske Auxiliærkorps I Nordtyskland 1813 (PDF) (in Danish). Chakoten.dk. 2013.
- Sønderjyske Årbøger 2012 (PDF) (in Danish). Historisk Samfund for Sønderjylland. 2012.
