= Sailor Company (Denmark-Norway) =

- Matroskompagniet
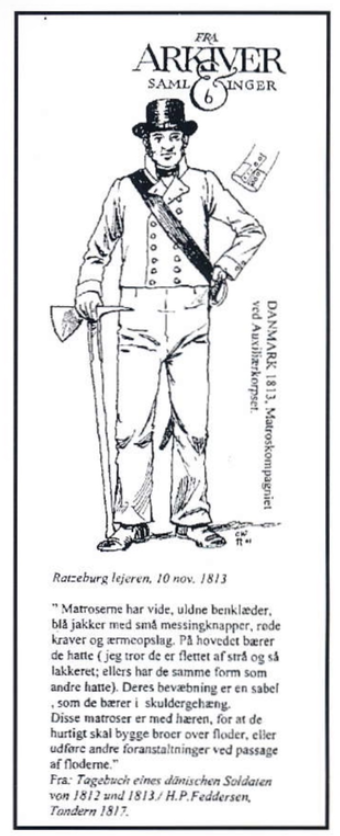
- A salior of the Salior Company
- Active: 1813-1814
- Country: Denmark–Norway
- Branch: Royal Dano-Norwegian Navy
- Type: Coastal defence
- Engagements: Battle of Bornhöved (1813); Battle of Sehested

Commanders
- Notable commanders: Frederik Christian Holsten

The Sailor Company (Danish: Matroskompagniet) was a Danish military unit, created to support the Danish Auxiliary Corps as pontoniers in 1813. The immediate reason for its creation was to provide the Danish Auxiliary Corps with sailors who could assist the army in crossing rivers and other waterways.

== History ==
In August 1813, King Frederik VI ordered the creation of a specialized field naval company under Captain-Lieutenant Frederik Christian Holsten. Formed from 40 ship carpenters and 80 sailors.

The company joined the Auxiliary Corps in northern Germany toward the end of August 1813. It was therefore a reinforcement of the Danish corps rather than one of the units present in its original mid-August establishment. The company was subsequently employed under the corps command during the operations in Holstein.

On 7 December 1813, during the battle of Bornhöved, the company carried out one of its most important actions. As the Swedish cavalry, more specifically the Mörner's Hussar Regiment, pursued the danish rear guard, the sailors destroyed the bridge over the Trave at Groß Rönnau, north of Segeberg. The Swedes were consequently forced to establish a makeshift crossing, over which the horses could only be brought across one at a time. This delayed the Swedish cavalry and helped give the danish rear guard time to reach and pass through the defile at Bornhöved.

The company then continued with the danish retreat to Rendsburg. On 10 December 1813, the Danish Auxiliary Corps fought the Battle of Sehested, where the company was part of the danish force.

At Sehested the sailors were also used directly in support of the artillery. A later account based on the campaign records states that the company helped the artillery during the decisive fighting. Captain Holsten himself was at the front with his men and was temporarily cut off by enemy troops; he escaped by speaking English, causing the enemy soldiers to mistake him for their own officers.

The company's conduct during the campaign received official recognition. In Prince Frederik of Hesse's report to King Frederik VI dated 8 April 1814, Captain Holsten and Second Lieutenant Fim were specifically mentioned as having attracted the attention and respect of the army corps.

Following the end of the campaign and the Treaty of Kiel on 14 January 1814, the company ceased to exist as a separate formation.

== Uniform and insignia ==
They wore a blue shirt with a carmoisine collar and yellow buttons, they wore blue pantaloons, round hat, and black swordsheath.

The company was ordered to march with the ensign and pennant of the Navy. Both of were swallowtail versions of the Dannebrog.
