= Battle of Bornhöved (1813) =

1813 battle during the War of the Sixth Coalition

- Part of the Dano-Swedish War (1813–1814)
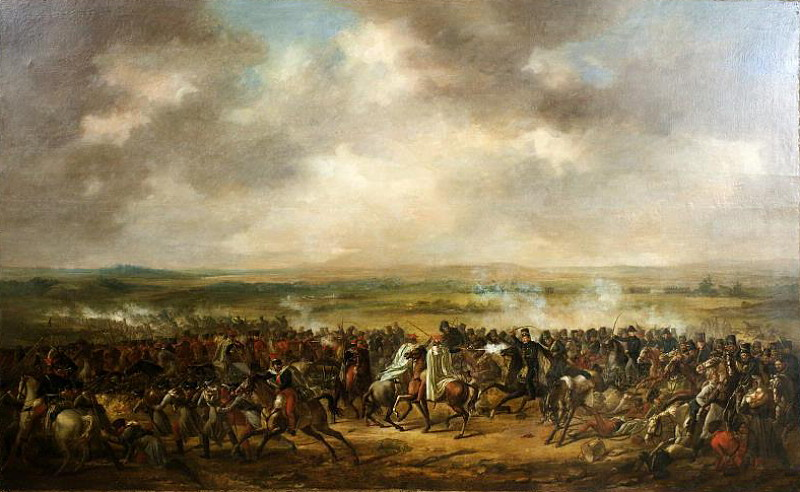
- Battle of Bornhöved by Per Krafft the younger
Date	7 December 1813
Location	Bornhöft, Schleswig-Holstein, present-day Germany 54°4′N 10°12′E
Result	Disputed (see Aftermath)

Belligerents
Denmark–Norway	Sweden

Commanders and leaders
(Denmark–Norway) Frederik of Hesse	(Sweden) Anders Skjöldebrand (Sweden) Bror Cederström

Strength
1,000 cavalry 2,000–3,000 infantry	900 cavalry

Casualties and losses
120–300 killed, wounded and captured 3 guns	21 killed 55 wounded 128 horses
- Location within Europe

War of the Sixth Coalition:
German campaign
current battle
Napoleon in command
Napoleon not in command

The Battle of Bornhöved or Bornhöft took place on 7 December 1813 between a Swedish cavalry regiment, Mörner's Hussar Regiment (later Kronprinsens husarregemente or Crown Prince's Hussar Regiment) under Bror Cederström, and Prince Frederik of Hesse's Danish troops reinforced by smaller numbers of Polish cavalry and German infantry. The clash occurred at the small village of Bornhöft in what is now Schleswig-Holstein in northern Germany. The engagement occurred during the War of the Sixth Coalition, part of the Napoleonic Wars, and was one of the last times Swedish and Danish forces met on the battlefield.

== Background ==
Crown Prince Charles John led a division of the northern armies, including the Mörner's Hussar Regiment, under the command of the commander of the Swedish cavalry Anders Fredrik Skjöldebrand, to pursue the retreating Danish army. The idea was for the Swedish cavalry to advance in parallel to the Danes until general Wallmoden could cut off their retreat and force the outmanoeuvred Danes to surrender.

== Battle ==
Charles John had been very economical with Swedish forces throughout the war and deliberately held back to allow the allies to take huge losses whilst he held onto the Swedish forces for future use. The Swedish cavalry thus felt left out of all the war's previous major battles. This, in addition to their regiment not seeing combat in the 1808–09 war that lost Finland, made them disobey their orders and ride straight against the Danish forces. It then clashed with the Danish rearguard (made up of Polish ulans, an elite force sent out by Napoleon to cover the Danish retreat) throughout the day until in the evening the Swedes met the main Danish force gathered at Bornhöved.

This force consisted of between 5,000 and 8,000 men, of which 1,000 cavalry and 2,000 to 3,000 infantry would take part in the fighting.

It would not normally have considered the advance guard of the Swedish cavalry as a major threat (since in such difficult terrain and so close to nightfall a frontal cavalry assault on the massed infantry with artillery support would be pure folly), but since their rearguard was still embroiled in fighting with Swedish patrols the Danes formed up in ranks and waited.

The Swedish cavalry force consisted of 1,200 men, of which 900 would be engaged.

First came the Danish rearguard, still harried by some Swedish squadrons under major Fritz von der Lancken and finally dispersed by the Swedish assault. The attackers then turned on the main Danish force and the Danes staked all their forces at once, with a Swedish reconnaissance beaten off and von der Lancken in retreat. In the meantime the main Swedish force began to form up. With seven squadrons totalling 471 men, commanded by Colonel Bror Cederström, the Swedish cavalry immediately moved to the attack, broke up the Danish formations and drove them into retreat.

== Aftermath ==
The Danish losses in the battle are unknown; the official Danish report admitted to 11 killed, 35 wounded and 75 missing. A subsequent Danish bulletin, on the other hand, attested to 200 killed. The Swedes claimed to have captured 200 to 300 Danes, and killed and wounded many more. Two cannons and one howitzer were also captured. Some 400 Danes were captured in the following days as the Swedes pursued. The Swedish losses were 21 men killed, 55 wounded, and 128 horses killed or wounded.

The result of the battle is disputed. The people who claim it as a Danish victory emphasise that the attack was repulsed, the Danes kept the battlefield, the Danes had less dead and wounded, and the Danes could continue marching to Kiel. Contrary, many people also describe it as a Swedish victory. Kronprinsens husarer carried Bornhöft 1813 as a battle honour on its standard.

== Bibliography ==
- Glenthøj, R.; Ottosen, M. (2014). Experiences of War and Nationality in Denmark and Norway, 1807-1815. Springer. p. 203. ISBN 978-1137313898.
- Griese, Volker (2012). Schleswig-Holstein - Denkwürdigkeiten der Geschichte Historische Miniaturen (in German). Germany: Books on Demand, Norderstedt. ISBN 9783844812831.
- Palmblad, Vilhelm Fredrik; Wieselgren, Peter (1847). Biographiskt Lexicon öfver namnkunnige Svenska Män (in Swedish). Vol. 14. Uppsala: Wahlström & C. OCLC 470641899.
- von Beskow, Bernhard (1852). Kongl. Vitterhets historie och antiquitets academiens handlingar (in Swedish). Vol. 20. Stockholm: Kungliga Vitterhets Historie och Antikvitets Akademien. OCLC 185616922.

Preceded by Battle of Nivelle	Napoleonic Wars; Battle of Bornhöved (1813)	Succeeded by Battle of Sehested
