= Siege of Hamburg =

1813–1814 siege during the War of the Sixth Coalition

- Part of the German campaign of the Sixth Coalition
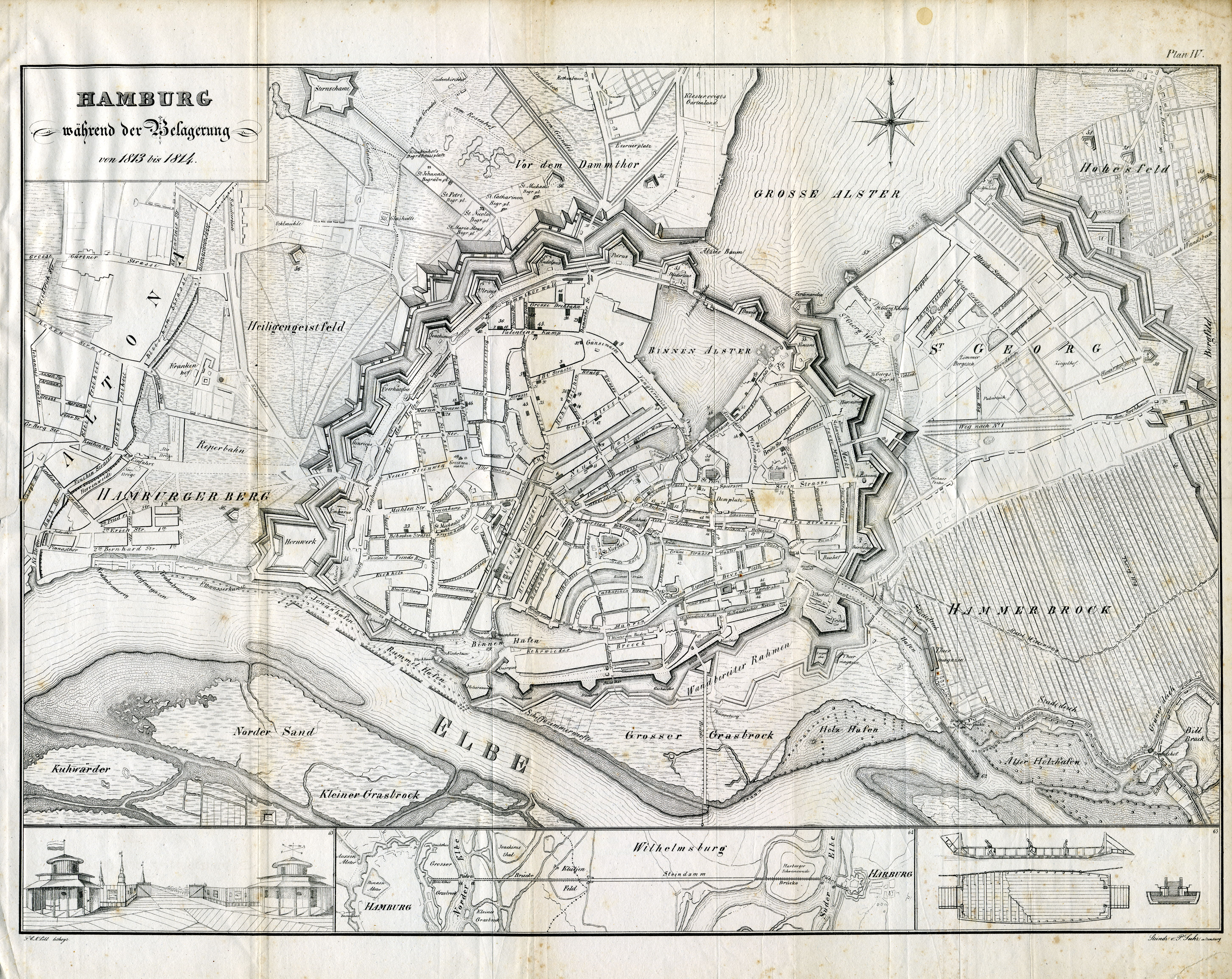
- 1830s map of Hamburg during the siege (1813–14)
Date	24 December 1813 – 12 May 1814
Location	Hamburg, Bouches-de-l'Elbe, France 53°33′N 9°59′E
Result	French victory

Belligerents
(First French Empire) French Empire	Russian Empire

Commanders and leaders
(First French Empire) Louis-Nicolas Davout	(Russian Empire) Levin August von Bennigsen (Russian Empire) Dmitry Dokhturov (Russian Empire) Ludwig von Wallmoden-Gimborn

Strength
40,000 initially (25,000 men later left for France)	56,000; 120,000 at the time of January 1814

Casualties and losses
6,000 killed or wounded	6,000 killed or wounded

War of the Sixth Coalition:
German campaign
current battle
Napoleon in command
Napoleon not in command

The siege of Hamburg took place from December 1813 to May 1814, at the end of the wars of the War of the Sixth Coalition. The French garrison of Hamburg, commanded by Marshal Davout, resisted the coalition forces of Prussia, the Russian Empire, and Sweden for nearly six months.

Isolated from the main theatre of war of the German Campaign of 1813 by the defeat of Marshal Oudinot at the Battle of Grossbeeren, Marshal Davout's 13th Corps withdrew to the Hamburg region, which the French had fortified during the summer. After the Battle of Leipzig and the retreat of the Grande Armée to the Rhine, the uprising in the Netherlands and the Russian occupation of Bremen severed communications between Hamburg and France.

Initially separated by the natural defenses formed by the lower reaches of the Elbe and the Bille, the French garrison and the besieging army engaged in psychological warfare throughout December. In January, the branches of the Elbe froze over, allowing Russian forces to launch several assaults against the city. Despite the loss of a few advanced positions, the French garrison managed to retain the strategic positions of Harburg and Wilhelmsburg. From 23 March, the thaw ended the assaults and marked a return to psychological warfare.

When Napoleon abdicated on 6 April 1814, Marshal Davout still firmly held Hamburg. He refused to believe in the return of the Bourbons until 28 April and continued, even after that date, to refuse the surrender of the city to his Russian adversary. In early May, the marshal was relieved of his command; General Foucher de Careil negotiated the restitution of the city, while General Étienne Gérard escorted the 13th Corps back to France. The corps left Hamburg freely, with arms and baggage, on 27, 29, and 31 May 1814.

Marshal Davout was criticized as early as May 1814 for his management of relations with the civilian population, particularly for the seizure of funds from the Bank of Hamburg. Although these accusations were quickly dropped, they, along with his late allegiance to Louis XVIII, resulted in a period of disgrace that ended only with the Emperor's return during the Hundred Days.

== Context ==
=== Annexation of Hamburg ===
The cities of Hamburg and Bremen were occupied by the French army from 1806, following the end of the Prussian campaign. After having experienced several military governors, they were annexed to the French Empire on 13 December 1810, while Marshal Davout was appointed Governor-General of the Hanseatic cities on 1 December. This annexation reflected a desire to tighten the Continental System, which proved difficult to enforce in these trade-oriented cities.

=== Revolt of Hamburg ===
After the French invasion of Russia and the near-total destruction of the Imperial Grande Armée, nationalist sentiment revived throughout Germany. On 12 March 1813, a popular uprising forced General Claude Carra Saint-Cyr, commander of the 32nd Division that included Hamburg, to evacuate the city. On 18 March, a Russian corps commanded by General Tettenborn entered the city.

The French response was swift. While Marshal Davout was appointed head of the 32nd Division with authority over the 1st Corps of General Vandamme, the latter left Bremen in early May and marched on Hamburg. After repelling, on 6 May, an attempt by Tettenborn against one of his brigades, Vandamme opened fire on the city on the 19th. King Frederick VI of Denmark placed a division at Davout's disposal, which the marshal directed toward Lübeck. The Russians were forced to evacuate Hamburg, and Franco-Danish troops entered the city on 31 May.

Napoleon ordered severe repression following these events. Nevertheless, Davout managed to moderate the measures, eventually securing the promulgation of an amnesty on 26 July.

=== German Campaign ===
Map of troop movements at the end of August 1813.

The French emperor's initial plan consisted of a vast envelopment of the Allied armies, (Note: The term "Allies" usually refers to the members of the Sixth Coalition, although many German, Polish, and Italian contingents continued to serve alongside the French at the beginning of the campaign. Nearly all of them had defected by the end of the year.) in which the French army, after advancing as far as Dresden, would push toward Berlin and then turn south. Within this framework, the troops occupying the mouth of the Elbe were to play only a secondary role, and Napoleon replaced the experienced 1st Corps with the newly formed 13th Corps.

After the unexploited French victories at Lützen and Bautzen, an armistice was signed between the belligerents, halting operations from 4 June to 10 August. When hostilities resumed, Napoleon refused to withdraw to the Rhine or abandon the Netherlands and Hamburg, despite his clear numerical inferiority, considering both regions as French. While the emperor maneuvered around Dresden to keep Blücher at bay and defeated the Austrian army of Schwarzenberg, Oudinot, at the head of 60,000 men, advanced on Berlin between the Elbe and the Spree, intending to link up with the Hamburg garrison. He was stopped at Gross Beeren by Bernadotte, definitively isolating the 13th Corps from the main theatre of operations.

After the Battle of Leipzig, the French army retreated toward France, leaving behind in Germany only besieged garrisons in fortified places such as Hamburg, Magdeburg, and Dresden.

== Preliminary operations ==
=== Fortification works of the city ===
In anticipation of a siege, the marshal initiated major fortification works. To secure control of the Elbe, the French restored the ramparts of Harburg, on the left bank of the river, and built a massive bridge between the two cities. The strengthening of the city's defenses followed the emperor's instructions, who entrusted General Haxo with supervising the works; overall command of the engineers on site was given to Colonel Charles François Deponthon.

During the armistice of the summer of 1813, the emperor dispatched an artillery reinforcement to Hamburg as well as a company of sailors under the command of Rear Admiral Lhermite. Their mission was to ensure the operation and defense of the many islands in the lower course of the Elbe.

By the end of the summer, after some dwellings located too close to the defensive works had been demolished, the fortress was considered ready for defense.

=== Operations in Mecklenburg and Holstein ===
After the armistice was broken on 11 August 1813, Davout transferred his headquarters from Hamburg to Wysoka Braniewska, on the road to Lübeck. The Allied forces, under the command of Bernadotte, occupied a line stretching from Lauenburg to Trittau. The 13th Corps broke through this defensive line during the Battle of Lauenburg and pushed its advance as far as Schwerin, which it reached on 27 August 1813. Upon learning of the defeat of Oudinot at the Battle of Grossbeeren, Davout withdrew behind a line running from Lübeck to Lauenburg.

Although Bremen was briefly occupied by the corps of Tettenborn, the 13th Corps maintained its communications with France via the Netherlands. However, after the Battle of Leipzig, the Grande Armée retreated toward France, pursued by the Allied armies, and the Netherlands rose in revolt. It was only on 11 November 1813 that Davout received orders from the emperor to withdraw toward France while leaving a garrison in Hamburg, but by then it was too late: the left bank of the Elbe was already occupied by strong Allied contingents.

On 1 December, the marshes and the Stecknitz Canal behind which the French were entrenched froze over. As these natural defenses could now be crossed on foot by the Allies, Marshal Davout ordered a withdrawal into the city of Hamburg, while his Danish allies moved northward to cover their own kingdom.

== Forces present ==
=== French Army ===
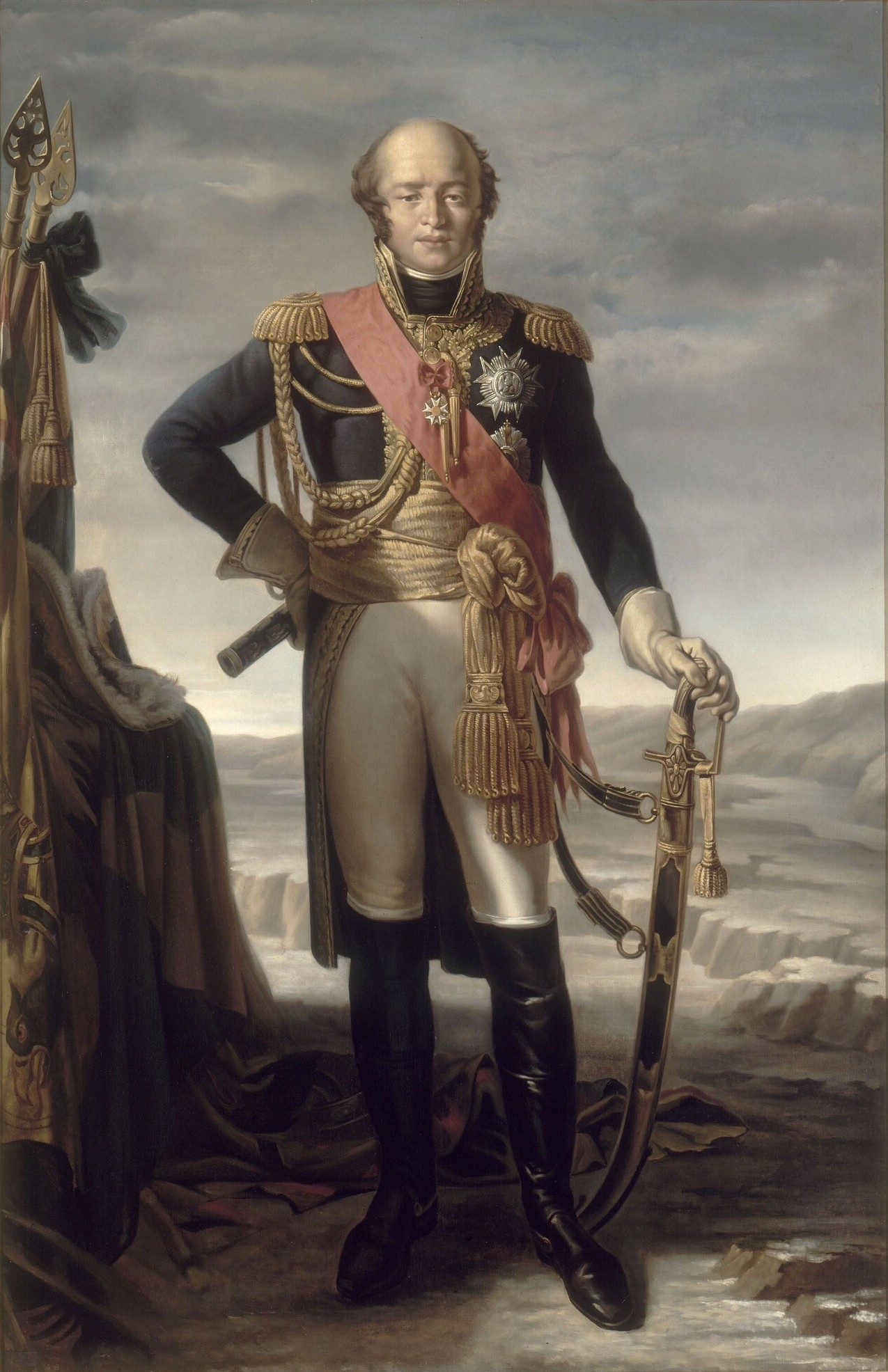
Marshal Davout, commander of the French troops.

At the beginning of the summer, the 13th Corps numbered 32,000 men, to which were added about 10,000 Danes. Upon returning to Hamburg, it was reinforced by remnants of various corps that joined the area under his control following the retreat after Leipzig.

At the beginning of the siege, the French forces totaled 42,000 men, of whom 8,000 were in hospitals.

The troops were organized as follows (Note: During the six months of the siege, some regiments were transferred from one division to another and the staff was reorganized, which may explain discrepancies between sources.):

Commander-in-chief: Marshal Davout.

==== Staff ====
- Chief of staff: General César de Laville
- Governor of the fortress: General Hogendorp
- Deputy governor: General Soyez
- Chief of supplies: General Thiébault
- Commander of artillery: General de Jouffroy
- Commander of engineers: Colonel Deponthon

==== 3rd Division ====
Commanded by General Loison, who was also responsible for security within the walls of Hamburg.

- 1st Brigade: General Rome
  - 15th Line Infantry Regiment and 44th Line Infantry Regiment.
- 2nd Brigade: General Louis Nicolas Leclerc
  - 48th Line Infantry Regiment and 108th Line Infantry Regiment.
- 8 divisional artillery pieces.

The division totaled 9,842 men.

==== 40th Division ====
According to sources, it was commanded either by General Pécheux or by General Vichery.

- 1st Brigade: General Gengoult
  - 30th Line Infantry Regiment and 61st Line Infantry Regiment.
- 2nd Brigade: General Delcambre
  - 111th Line Infantry Regiment. Digby Smith also attaches the 33rd Light Infantry Regiment to this brigade.
- 8 divisional artillery pieces.

The division totaled 10,000 men.

==== 50th Division ====
According to sources, it was commanded either by General Thiébault or by General Pécheux.

- 1st Brigade: General Avril
  - 29th Line Infantry Regiment. François-Guy Hourtoulle and the author of Trophées des Armées Françaises also attach the 33rd Light Infantry Regiment to this brigade.
- 2nd Brigade: General Osten
  - 3rd Line Infantry Regiment and 105th Line Infantry Regiment.
- 8 divisional artillery pieces.
- Digby Smith also assigns the 24th Light Infantry Regiment to the division.

The division totaled 9,680 men.

==== Cavalry Division ====
The cavalry division was commanded by Général de division Pierre Watier, assisted by the brigadier generals Dubois de Thimville and Marie Adrien François Guiton. It was organized around the 28th Chasseurs à Cheval Regiment and included elements from several other regiments, including three provisional regiments of cuirassiers.

In total, the division comprised 5,800 men and 3,800 horses.

==== Other combat units ====
Rear Admiral Lhermite commanded a detachment of sailors numbering 1,200 men. This detachment was intended for service on the various branches of the Elbe between Hamburg and Harburg.

In addition to the 24 divisional artillery pieces, the fortress of Hamburg was equipped with 52 horse-drawn guns from the 8th Foot Artillery Regiment and various other regiments. The fortress also mounted 350 rampart guns.

=== Allied armies ===
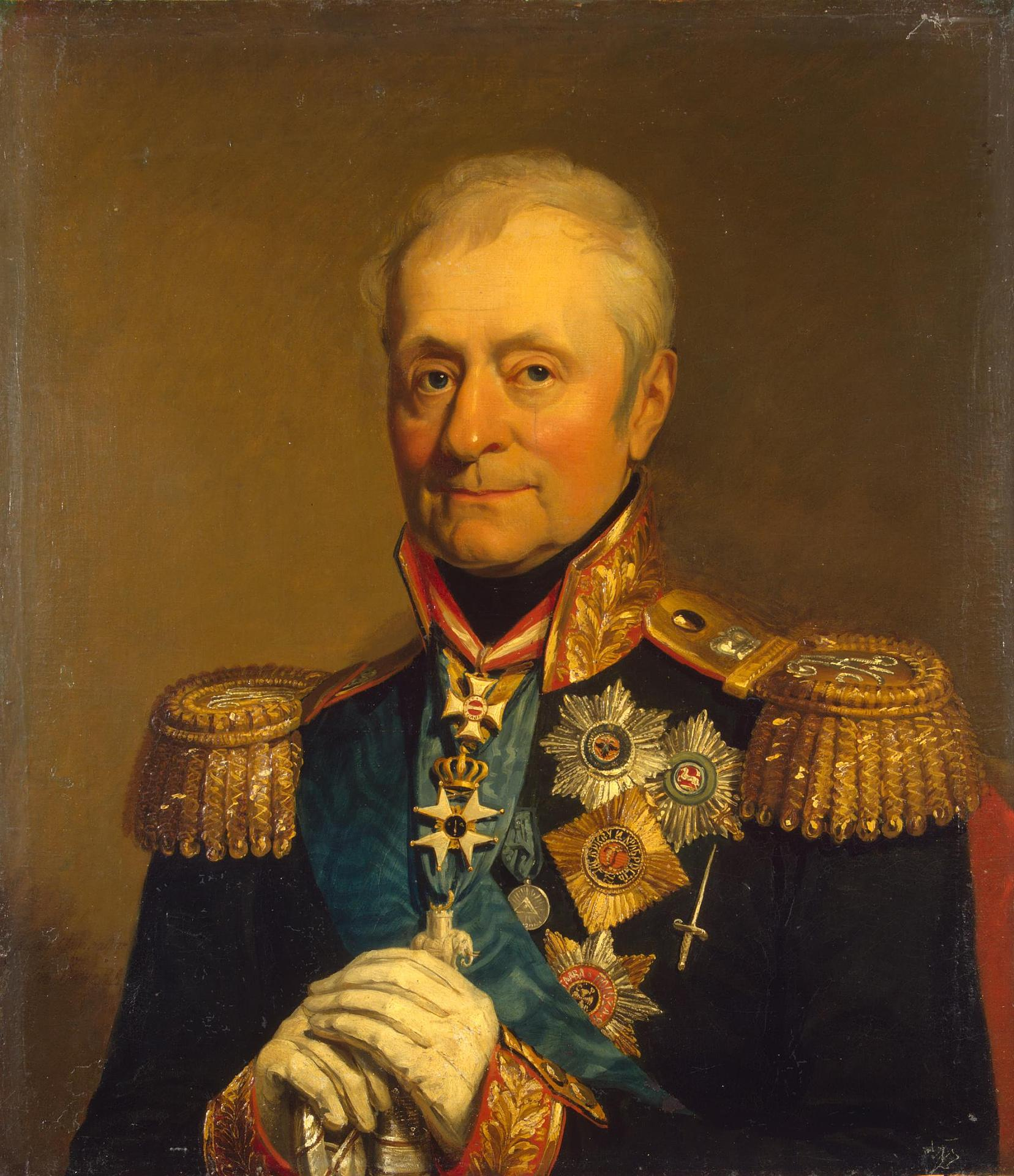
General Bennigsen, commander of the Allied forces.

The strength of the Allied armies varied considerably over the six months of the siege.

The besieging forces initially consisted of the corps of Lieutenant General von Wallmoden, numbering approximately 52,000 men, composed of Hanoverian and Hanseatic regiments. This corps was attached to the Army of the North commanded by Bernadotte. General Bennigsen subsequently took command of the siege operations, bringing with him a number of Russian troops. Bennigsen and Bernadotte were later joined by General Dokhturov's men, who arrived at Hamburg after taking part in the siege of Magdeburg. In January 1814, the Allies numbered about 120,000 in the siege area. When Bernadotte and his troops moved toward the Rhine, Bennigsen still had approximately 80,000 men at his disposal.

== Course of the siege ==
=== Psychological warfare in December ===
Hoping that the inhabitants of Hamburg would renew the March uprising and that the Dutch troops of the 13th Corps (Note: After the annexation of the Kingdom of Holland to the Empire in 1810, the Dutch were considered French and integrated into the Grande Armée. The Dutch light infantry regiment became the 33rd Light Infantry Regiment, which was present in Hamburg.) would follow the example of their insurgent compatriots, Bennigsen issued two proclamations calling on them to rise up. These appeals remained without effect in the face of the firm measures taken by the French commander-in-chief.

Davout used this period to complete the fortifications around the "Deponthon causeway" linking Hamburg to Harburg by constructing a redoubt on an island opposite Altona and another opposite Hamm. In December, Davout ordered the evacuation of the city's orphans, as well as all children whose parents agreed to their removal. A total of 15,360 people were evacuated on 24, 25, and 26 December.

The marshal also divided responsibilities among the various generals. While Thiébault was placed in charge of supplies and Loison of security intra muros, Vichery was responsible for the sector east of the city, Gengoult and Delcambre held the northern sector facing Altona, and Pécheux defended Harburg while detaching General Osten's brigade to guard the islands of the Elbe.

=== Winter assaults ===
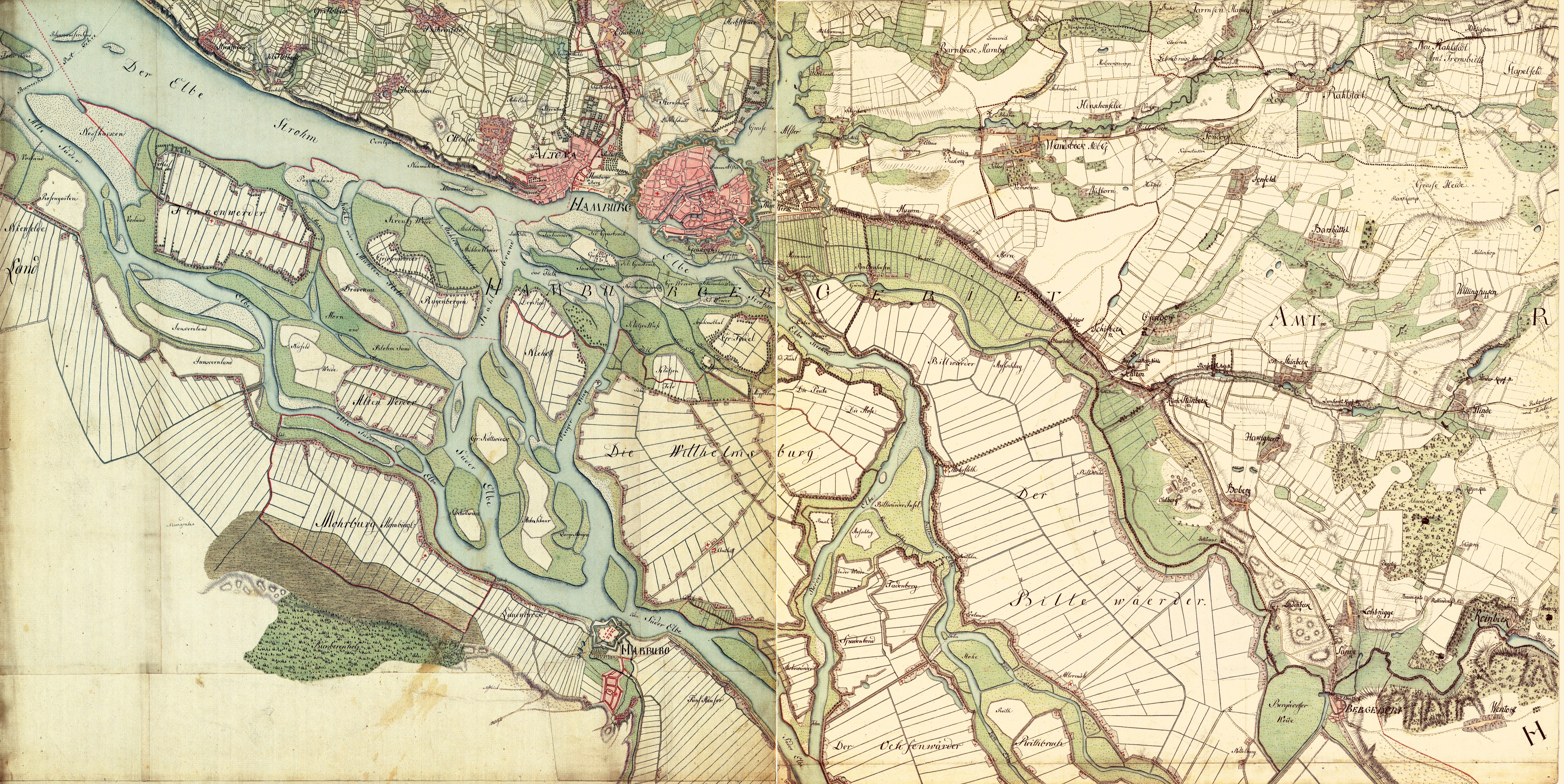
Map of the islands of the Elbe between Hamburg and Harburg.

From January onward, the cold became so intense that the Elbe and the Bille froze, despite the constant efforts of the French to preserve the natural protection provided by the canal network. The Coalition forces then launched several assaults, forcing the French to withdraw from the villages of Eimsbüttel and Eppendorf to the north, as well as from several positions to the east.

On 20 January 1814, Russian troops under General Stroganov attacked the advanced fortifications of Harburg. The columns advancing along the Elbe and through Wilstorf were repulsed by General Delcambre, who lost 200 men in the action, while the Russians left 800 men on the field.

On 26 January, on the occasion of the birthday of Empress Elizabeth, Bennigsen ordered a general assault on the northern and eastern fronts. The only result of this attack, which cost the 13th Corps 700 men and the Russians 300, was the capture of the church of Hamm. Following this assault, Davout ordered the destruction of a large part of the houses in the suburb of Altona.

On 9 February, after receiving reinforcements from the corps of Tolstoy, Bennigsen launched a general attack. Davout's establishment of an observation post in the bell tower of St. Michael's Church deprived the Russians of the hoped-for element of surprise. The main attack was directed against the island of Wilhelmsburg, which was the scene of fierce fighting throughout the day. The Russians initially gained the upper hand. The column of General Markov coming from Altona and that of General Emme advancing from the southeast and bypassing Harburg converged on the entrance to the bridge linking the island to Hamburg. Disoriented by the loss of their leaders (the colonel of the 29th Line Infantry Regiment was killed and General Osten wounded), the French began to fall back onto the bridge when Marshal Davout personally arrived on the scene and ordered the reserves remaining in Hamburg to counterattack. By late afternoon, General Leclerc, after repulsing a Russian column commanded by Tolstoy, was able to send reinforcements onto the bridge. At the same time, General Pécheux sallied out from Harburg, which he had defended against the assault of a Russian column, cleared the section of the bridge linking it to Wilhelmsburg, and took the Russians in the rear. Broken by the French counterattack, the Russians retreated as far as Altona. The garrison lost 1,200 men killed, wounded, or captured in this engagement.

On 17 February, the Russians attempted another massive assault, which failed in the face of resistance by Generals Vichery and Rome. French losses amounted to 200 killed, while the Russians lost nearly 5,000 men. After a final night attempt on 27 February, operations were limited to skirmishes. The breakup of the ice on the Elbe on 23 March definitively placed the city beyond the reach of an assault.

=== Resumption of psychological warfare and end of the siege ===
With the end of winter and the beginning of spring, Bennigsen intensified his appeals for the garrison to defect and stepped up disinformation measures. Despite a few individual desertions, these efforts failed to achieve their objective, but they fostered a climate of extreme distrust toward the Russian command within the French staff. On 29 March, the French launched a series of sorties around Harburg in order to obtain forage and supplies.

On 19 April, the commander of the besieging forces was informed of the abdication of Napoleon I and dispatched a parliamentary envoy to inform Davout. Knowing, as he later wrote, that "the Emperor was not accustomed to communicating with his generals through the enemy", and having no confidence in Bennigsen, the marshal received both the news and the Russian general's proposal for an armistice with the utmost caution. The news was nevertheless confirmed by a letter from Tsar Alexander, delivered by a Dutch officer, prompting Davout to request permission to send General Delcambre to France to obtain instructions from the government.

In an attempt to force his opponent's hand, Bennigsen had a white flag bearing fleurs-de-lis, the emblem of Louis XVIII, brought before the French outposts, hoping that the garrison would rise upon hearing of the change of regime. In response to this provocation, the marshal ordered the flag to be fired upon.

Although hostilities between France and the Coalition powers had officially ceased following the abdication of 6 April, Russian forces, supported by British gunboats, launched an assault on Harburg on 27 April. The attack failed and further increased French mistrust toward the Russian staff.

On 28 April, a cousin of the marshal, François Davout, appeared at the Russian headquarters and was immediately escorted to the French lines. He carried letters from the marchioness Davout informing her husband of events in Paris. The two commanders-in-chief then concluded an armistice. General Delcambre was able to travel to Paris, and on 29 April the white flag with fleurs-de-lis flew over the city.

While it was clear that the city of Hamburg was to be returned to the German authorities, the fate of the garrison remained unresolved. Bennigsen initially hoped to take it prisoner to Russia and continued until the end to obstruct both its evacuation and the removal of its matériel.

On 5 May, General Foucher de Careil, the government envoy tasked with the restitution of the city, arrived in Hamburg. He was followed on 11 May by General Gérard, charged by the Count of Artois and the new Minister of War, General Dupont de l'Étang, with relieving Marshal Davout of his command and escorting the 13th Corps back to France. The 26,000 men of the garrison still fit for service returned to France in three columns, which left the banks of the Elbe on 27, 29 May, and 31 May. General Gérard took with him around one hundred artillery pieces and 4,000 horses. The 5,000 people who remained in hospital rejoined France at the end of their convalescence.

== Consequences ==
=== Strategic consequences ===
The Hamburg garrison played only a secondary role in the course of the German campaign of 1813. After Oudinot's defeat at Groß-Beeren, the 13th Corps halted its advance on Berlin and, in October, was unable to prevent the Army of the North from moving toward Leipzig. Nevertheless, the possession of Hamburg and the resulting control of the lower course of the Elbe enabled Davout to significantly disrupt the German economy throughout the early months of 1814.

Supplying the German fortresses (Hamburg, Magdeburg, Dresden, etc.) led to a severe shortage of military matériel for the Napoleonic army during the Campaign of France, which began on 1 January 1814. For this reason, the Emperor's decision to leave such large garrisons in Germany has sometimes been criticized. While these garrisons tied down far larger numbers of Allied troops for siege operations, their absence during the battles of 1814, when the French field army was extremely reduced, was felt.

The defense of Hamburg became a subject of study in military academies during the first half of the 19th century.

=== Hamburger Bank bullion affair ===
Napoleon imposed a heavy war contribution on the city of Hamburg following its revolt in March 1813. The portion paid immediately in cash was sent to France, and on 15 September 1813, Count Chaban, intendant general of finances of the 32nd Division, informed Davout that the army risked being unable to cover normal operating expenses from the end of October onward. The marshal had indeed ordered that all supplies be paid for in cash, in order to avoid provoking unrest among the population. When the war contribution due on 1 October was not paid, intelligence reached the French command of a transfer of bullion from the Hamburger Bank to the Danish city of Altona. A decision was therefore taken on 2 November to seize the bank's funds.

The French seized 7,489,343 marks banco, (Note: The mark banco was a unit of account used for banking operations in Hamburg.) equivalent to approximately thirteen million francs. As Hamburg merchants agreed to refuse payment in bullion originating from the bank, the French set up two minting workshops and melted the bullion into coins of the city of Hamburg. This currency was then used to pay army wages and the salaries of Hamburg workers employed on fortification works, allowing economic activity to be maintained in the besieged city.

Accounts of these expenditures were kept by Count Chaban and later by a commission established for this purpose after his death in March. However, as early as the end of the siege, numerous voices were raised against the seizure of the Hamburg Bank, and Davout was later accused by some of having personally appropriated part of the funds.

The affair left a lasting impression and was subsequently used to revive anti-French sentiment in Germany. Thus, in 1890, Field Marshal von Moltke invoked the memory of this event to secure the approval of military credits from the German parliament.

=== Consequences for the career of Marshal Davout ===
Although his methods—unjust and arbitrary, even barbarous and cruel in certain particular cases—may have been, they nevertheless served their military purpose as effectively as possible. Every soldier will subscribe to the opinion expressed by Johann Sporschill (in: Die Grosse Kronik) that there is certainly no military power in Europe that would not wish to have, at the head of a besieged fortress, a man such as Davout. His rigorous measures were dictated by the necessities of war.

— Comments by the Prussian General Yorck of Wartenburg, taken from his work Napoléon chef d'armée (1885)

Hardly had Marshal Davout re-entered France when he was notified by the Minister of War that he was forbidden to reside in Paris. He therefore withdrew to his estate at Savigny-sur-Orge. On 17 June 1814, less than a week after his arrival, General Dupont de l'Étang informed him that the King had received complaints regarding his conduct in Hamburg. Three accusations were brought against him: that he had ordered fire to be opened on the white Bourbon flag after having been assured of the restoration of the Bourbons; that he had appropriated the funds of the Hamburger Bank; and that he had "committed arbitrary acts tending to render the French name odious".

After receiving the archives of his command at the end of June, Davout drafted the Mémoire de M. le Maréchal Davout, Prince d'Eckmühl, au Roi, which he sent to Louis XVIII on 20 July 1814. In this work of some thirty pages, he carefully refuted all the accusations brought against him, without adopting the courtly style in vogue at the time. On 26 July 1814, the Minister of War informed him that the King had accepted his Mémoire, that no proceedings would be brought against him, and that he was even authorized to publish the document in order to silence his critics.

Despite this outcome, the marshal remained the target of hostility from ultra-royalist circles, and Louis XVIII kept him out of the public eye. A collective démarche by the marshals, including the highly favored Ney and Soult, failed to change the monarch's mind. This disgrace had two consequences: Davout's estate rapidly became a gathering place for discontented Bonapartists, and the marshal himself was not summoned to take the oath of loyalty to the new sovereign. He therefore rallied to Napoleon without hesitation upon the latter's entry into the Tuileries during the Hundred Days.

== Bibliography ==
- Bauer, Frank (2010). Hamburg 1813/1814: Kampf und Leiden einer Stadt [Hamburg 1813/1814: The struggle and suffering of a city]. Kleine Reihe Geschichte der Befreiungskriege 1813–1815 (in German). Potsdam: Heft 31.
- Charrier, Pierre (2005). Le Maréchal Davout [Marshal Davout] (in French). Paris: Nouveau Monde. ISBN 2-84736-111-1.
- Charrier, Pierre (2005). Le Maréchal Davout [Marshal Davout] (in French). Paris: Nouveau Monde. ISBN 2-84736-111-1.
- Hourtoulle, François-Guy (1975). Davout le Terrible : duc d'Auerstaedt, prince d'Eckmhül, le meilleur lieutenant de Napoléon, colonel-général des grenadiers, 1770-1823 [Davout the Terrible: Duke of Auerstaedt, Prince of Eckmhül, Napoleon's best lieutenant, Colonel-General of the Grenadiers, 1770-1823] (in French). Paris: Maloine. ISBN 2-224-00175-4.
- Hulot, Frédéric (2003). Le Maréchal Davout [Marshal Davout] (in French). Paris: Pygmalion. ISBN 2-85704-792-4.
- Tissot, Pierre-François (1830). Trophées des Armées Françaises depuis 1792 jusqu'en 1825: Campagne de France [Trophies of the French Armies from 1792 to 1825: French campaign] (in French). Vol. 6. Paris: Le Fuel.
- Miquel, Pierre (1991). La Campagne de France de Napoléon [Napoleon's Campaign of France] (in French). Etrepilly: Christian de Bartillat. ISBN 2-905563-41-9.
- Patat, Jean-Pierre (2010). 1813: Seul contre tous [1813: Alone Against All] (in French). Paris: Bernard Giovanangeli. ISBN 978-2-7587-0058-6.
- Smith, Digby (1998). The Greenhill Napoleonic Wars Data Book. London: Greenhill Books. ISBN 1-85367-276-9.
- Stieve, Tilman Holger (1986). Die Hamburger Patrioten während der Franzosenzeit und der Versuch der Staatsreform in Hamburg: 1813–1815 [The Hamburg Patriots during the French Period and the Attempt at State Reform in Hamburg: 1813–1815] (in German). ISBN 3-923356-50-1.
- Stubbe da Luz, Helmut (2009). "Le maréchal Davout, « le beau siège de Hambourg » en 1813/14 et « le nom français »" [Marshal Davout, "the fine siege of Hamburg" in 1813/14 and "the French name"]. Francia (in French). 36.
- Tulard, Jean, ed. (1999). Dictionnaire Napoléon [Napoleon Dictionary] (in French). Vol. A–H. Paris: Fayard. p. 977. ISBN 2-213-60485-1.
