= Battle of Sehested =

1813 battle of the Dano-Swedish War of 1813–1814

- Part of the Dano-Swedish War of 1813–1814
- 1822 painting of the battle
Date	10 December 1813
Location	Near Sehested, Holstein 54.3667°N 9.8167°E
Result	Danish victory

Belligerents
Denmark–Norway	Russia; Hanover; Mecklenburg-Schwerin; Anhalt-Dessau; United Kingdom

Commanders and leaders
(Denmark–Norway) Prince Frederik of Hesse (Denmark–Norway) Georg Ludvig von der Schulenburg (First French Empire) François Lallemand (Denmark–Norway) Iver Christian Lasson	(Russian Empire) Ludwig von Wallmoden-Gimborn

Strength
9,000–11,000 men	10,000–10,500 men Bodart: 4,000

Casualties and losses
50–69 killed 273–319 wounded 146 missing Total: 500	522 killed or wounded 600 captured Total: 1,100
- Location within Europe

War of the Sixth Coalition:
German campaign
Current battle
Napoleon in command
Napoleon not in command

The Battle of Sehested was fought on 10 December 1813 during the Dano-Swedish War of 1813–1814 between a Danish army under Prince Frederik of Hesse and a Coalition force led by Ludwig von Wallmoden-Gimborn. Near Sehested, Holstein, Frederik's troops defeated the Coalition army, inflicting over 1,100 casualties on von Wallmoden-Gimborn's force while suffering only 500. However, this victory did not prevent the Coalition from emerging victorious in the conflict in 1814.

== Background ==
Denmark–Norway found itself involved in the Napoleonic Wars following the Battle of Copenhagen in 1807. To prevent the Dano-Norwegian navy from falling into French hands, British forces attacked and briefly occupied Copenhagen, capturing most of the Dano-Norwegian fleet at anchor. Denmark–Norway, which up till then maintained its neutrality in the conflict, thereafter sided openly with France. While keeping faith with this alliance, Frederick VI of Denmark tried to keep the country out of military campaigns as much as possible, and Danish troops did not go beyond a generic employment as occupational troops in the northern regions of Germany.

Following the French defeat in the Russian Campaign, at the beginning of 1813, Denmark–Norway formally declared a state of neutrality. The country was bankrupt and more than ever needed a return to peace to restore its disastrous economy. The negotiations initiated by Frederick IV with the powers of the sixth anti-French coalition, however, were unsuccessful. The Coalition favored Sweden's claims for an annexation of Norway, and in March 1813, the king decided to renew his treaty of alliance with France; a Danish expeditionary force, 13,000 strong under the orders of Prince Frederik of Hesse (brother-in-law of the monarch) was then deployed in the Schleswig-Holstein region and supported the forces of Marshal Louis Nicolas Davout in his campaigns in the Hamburg area against the multinational troops of the Russian general Ludwig von Wallmoden-Gimborn.

Shortly after Napoleon’s defeat at Leipzig on 19 October 1813, Davout received orders to defend against the advancing Coalition armies. Davout successfully prepared the defense of Hamburg and made the decision to establish a defensive line behind the Stecknitz River. French infantry divisions were placed to defend the southern portion of the line while the Danish Auxiliary Corps (DAC) under the command of Prince Frederik was ordered to defend the northern part of the line, from Travemünde to an area north of Mölln.

Wallmoden commanded the Coalition army given the responsibility to commence offensive operations against the French. The Coalition plan called for the French divisions to be surrounded and besieged in Hamburg. Once the French had been surrounded in Hamburg the offensive would advance north to isolate and destroy the DAC opening Denmark for invasion. The defeat or surrender of the Danish army would then allow Sweden to take possession of Norway. As a part of this plan, Wallmoden's army was reinforced with a Swedish corps and placed under the overall command of Prince Karl Johan of Sweden.

In late November, Davout realized that a major enemy offensive was forthcoming. He instantly began drawing up plans for the French withdrawal to Hamburg. This left the defence of Holstein in the hands of the DAC. On 30 November, Davout withdrew his French divisions to Hamburg. On 9 December, Coalition forces crossed the Alster River, severed the passage way between Hamburg and Holstein, and isolated the Danes. A short time later, Prince Frederik learned that the French corps was surrounded in Hamburg.

With no means to reach Hamburg, the Danish army left their defensive position in Lübeck and withdrew north toward Bornhöved. At the same time, Coalition forces under the command of Wallmoden moved north in an attempt to block the Danish line of retreat. The Danish crossed the Eider Canal and took positions near Gettorf and Lindau. Elements of Wallmoden's corps by that time had reached Sehested. The Danish army knew that Wallmoden was on their heels and had two alternatives. If they continued to march north, they feared that their slow convoy would be attacked by a Swedish cavalry division now located in Wittensee. If they marched west in an attempt to reach a defensive position at Rendsborg, they would likely cross paths and be forced to confront Wallmoden’s infantry. On 10 December, Prince Frederik made his decision and issued orders to march west toward Sehested.

== Battle ==
=== Holtsee and Haby ===
As the head of the Danish force was reaching the town of Holtsee, an enemy force could be seen in occupation. French General Lallemand's Advanced Guard deployed into battle formation, and the Danish vanguard halted to allow them to clear the enemy from the village. Major Baumberg, commanding the Coalition forces holding Holtsee, spotted the Danish army, but had no intention of engaging an entire corps with only three battalions. As such, he slowly began to withdraw west to the town of Haby, facing southeast.

Prince Frederik sent the Polish Cavalry Regiment to observe Baumberg's movements east of Haby. At the same time, he also sent two battalions of the Holstein Regiment, the battalion of the Queen's Regiment, and a hussar squadron to cover the area to the northeast of Holtsee.

Baumberg's slow withdrawal had given time for Wallmoden to bring up the rest of his troops from Sehested. However as the Danish troops continued to advance, he allowed himself to be pushed back towards the village. When Danish troops passed the southern end of the causeway leading through Haby, a detachment under Major Berger was left to prevent Baumberg from descending on the rear of the convoy. This was just in time as, within a few minutes, Baumberg's force attempted to storm the vanguard. This task was virtually impossible, as they could only form up in a column eight men wide, and the attack was beaten off with such heavy casualties, that Baumberg was effectively cut out of the action. The units left to track him east of Haby, were now joined by the four squadrons of cavalry from Holtsee, and as a consequence of this disastrous attack, these units were now free to begin to march towards the Sehested road and the rear of the vanguard.

=== Danish attack on Sehested ===
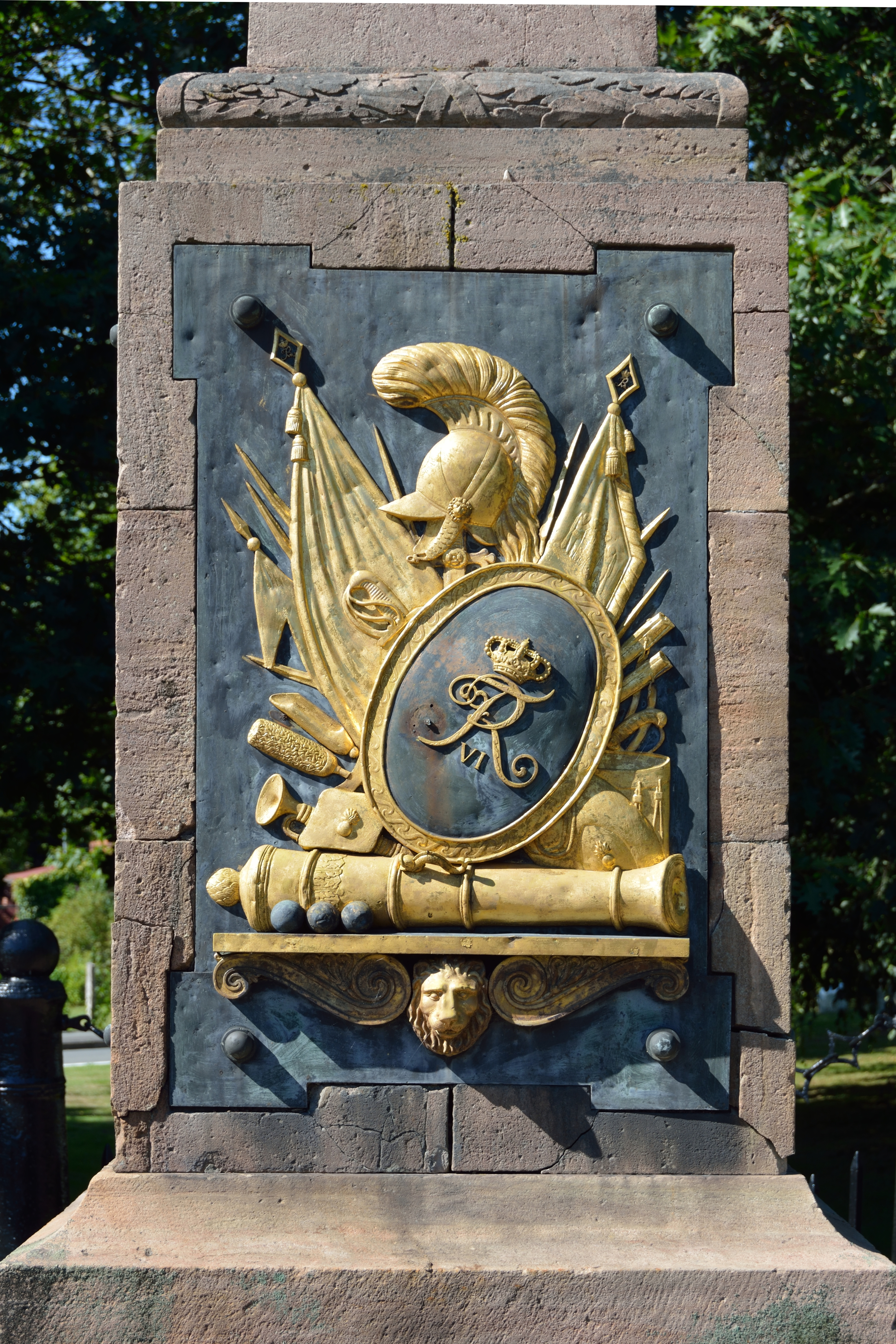
Memorial in Sehestedt

Wallmoden then pulled back to Sehested, where he turned to face the Danish army, forming up at the north of the long, straggling town, just south of the point where the Rendsborg road took a sharp right turn, with his left just north of the marsh which ran along the western side of the town on the river Eider. A Jäger battalion from Mecklenburg-Schwerin was sent across the river in the direction of Holtsee, to see if they could harass the Danish vanguard with long range musketry. Seeing their enemy taking up this position, the Danish once again halted, and prepared for battle. The 1st and 4th battalions of the Oldenburg regiments formed into columns, and supported by the fire of Gonner's and Koye's batteries, attacked Sehested, screened by a musketeer company of the 1st battalion and the Jäger company of the 4th. The 6th and 7th battalions of the Russian–German Legion immediately counterattacked, and supported by the 5th battalion, threw the Danish army back to its previous position.

Prince Frederik renewed the attack and pushed the Coalition forces back to the northern part of Sehested. The 6th and 7th battalions of the Russian-German Legion prepared a new defense, but were soon overrun. By 10 o’clock, Sehested was entirely in Danish hands. The Danish army formed a line alongside the southern edge of the town and a detachment under Major Bie, consisting of the 1st battalion of the Funen Infantry Regiment and the Friis battery, were sent to cover the ground between Sehested and Hohenfelde, which the Coalition left wing had retreated across. Wallmoden now ordered Sehested to be retaken and the 5th and 6th battalions of the Legion and the Anhalt-Dessau battalion, under covering fire from a horse artillery battery of the British Army's King's German Legion (KGL) and a Hanoverian foot artillery battery, returned to the fray, attacking in columns.

=== Wallmoden's counterattack and retreat ===
The leading column of the 5th battalion of the Legion was charged by the Funen Light Dragoon Regiment, but despite the attempt, was unable to form an infantry square in time. The survivors were taken prisoner, as were the crew of the KGL artillery battery and one of the Hanoverian guns. The other two battalions broke and routed back to safety, whilst the captured artillery pieces were dragged back into the Danish lines. The Coalition forces withdrew 500 metres down the Osterrode road, and took up a new position, with their left resting on Hohenfelde, and their right on the Eider. On their left, a fierce engagement developed between the 1st and 2nd battalions of the Russian-German Legion and Bie's force, with the outnumbered Danish getting the worst of it. After realizing his men had run out of ammunition, Bie was forced back about halfway to the Rendborg road, alongside the vanguard. Fortunately for the Danish army, the Holstein Cavalry Regiment and the Polish Cavalry Regiment from Haby, arrived and pushed the Coalition left wing back to its main body.

In a desperate attempt to break the Danish line, Wallmoden ordered Mecklenburg-Schwerin mounted Jägers to charge the southern part of Sehested. They were eventually routed by musketfire from the 2nd battalion of the Funen Infantry Regiment and the 1st battalion of the Schleswig Regiment. Realising that he could no longer hope to hold his position, Wallmoden ordered a retreat over the Eider to a position on the low heights around Osterrode. Prince Frederik ordered the Holstein Cavalry Regiment forward to try and convert this retreat into a rout, but their attack were beaten off by overwhelming Coalition musketfire and they fell back to the northern bank of the Eider. From there, they began an artillery bombardment on Wallmoden's position, as well as scouting on Vegesack's division, which had just arrived and was now occupying a position between Wakendorf and Bovenau to the west of the canal. Under heavy bombardment, Wallmoden now began to withdraw across the Cluvensieck bridge, taking up a defensive position facing back across the canal.

=== End of battle ===
Charles XIV John had now arrived on the scene, and after a short discussion with Wallmoden and Vegesack, sent a messenger to Prince Frederik suggesting a twenty-four hour ceasefire, in order to collect the wounded and bury the dead, to which Frederik agreed. The Danish troops marched after the vanguard, while a rearguard was kept on the left of the Mühlenerg, to prevent any attempt at pursuit. The battle was over. For the Danish army, they had achieved their objective of clearing the road to Rendsburg, whilst the Coalition had suffered an unhoped defeat. The Coalition had lost 1,100 men in total, whilst the Danish had lost approximately 500 men.

== Aftermath ==
The Danish army reached Rendsburg without further incident, where it established a defensive position along the course of the Eider; with Napoleon beaten and fleeing to France, however, King Frederick IV realized the futility of any further resistance and immediately signed an armistice with the Coalition powers in order to start peace negotiations. The negotiations eventually led to the signing, on 14 January 1814, of the Treaty of Kiel, which ended the participation of Denmark–Norway in the Napoleonic Wars.

== Order of battle ==
=== Danish force ===
Avant Garde Brigade: General François A. "Charles" Lallemand

- 2nd Battalion Schleswig Jäger Corps
- 1st & 2nd Battalions Holstein Sharpshooter Corps
- 1st Battalion 3rd (Jutland) Infantry Regiment
- Holstein Heavy Cavalry Regiment (4 squadrons)
- 17th Lithuanian Uhlan Regiment (2 squadrons)
- 6pdr Foot Battery von Gerstenberg (8 guns)

1st Brigade: General Graf Schulenburg

- 1st & 4th Battalions Oldenburg Infantry Regiment
- 3 Companies 2nd Battalion Oldernburg Infantry Regiment
- 3rd & 4th Battalions Holstein Infantry Regiment
- 2nd & 6th Squadrons Danish Hussar Regiment
- 3pdr Foot Battery von Gonner (8 guns)
- 6pdr Foot Battery Koye (8 guns)

2nd Brigade: General Lasson

- 1st & 2nd Battalions Funen Infantry Regiment
- 1st & 2nd Battalions Schleswig Infantry Regiment
- Funen Light Dragoon Regiment (3 squadrons)
- 6pdr Foot Battery Friis (10 guns)

Train Guard

- 1st Battalion Queen's Infantry Regiment
- 2 Companies 2nd Battalion Oldenburg Infantry Regiment
- Funen Light Dragoon Regiment (1 squadron)

Miscellanious

- Sailor Company

Total: 9,000 men

=== Coalition force ===
- Russian–German Legion
  - 1st Battalion (910)
  - 2nd Battalion (760)
  - 3rd Battalion
  - 4th Battalion
  - 5th Battalion (834)
  - 6th Battalion (808)
  - 7th Battalion (643)
  - 1st Hussar Regiment (487)
  - 1st Horse Battery (6 guns)
  - 2nd Horse Battery (6 guns)
- Hanoverian Army
  - Lauenburg's Battalion (638)
  - Langrehr's Battalion (638)
  - Bennigsen's Battalion (638)
  - Jäger company (40)
  - Foot artillery battery (4 guns)
  - Von Kielmannsegge's Feldgendarmerie
- Army of Mecklenburg-Schwerin
  - Foot Jägers (375)
  - Mounted Jägers (384)
- Army of Anhalt-Dessau
  - Infantry battalion (600)
- Army of Bremen-Verden
  - Hussar regiment (300)
- King's German Legion
  - Light detachment (150)
  - Horse artillery battery (2 guns)

Total: 10,500 men

== See also ==
- Treaty of Kiel

== Citations ==
Preceded by Battle of Bornhöved (1813)	Napoleonic Wars; Battle of Sehested	Succeeded by Battle of Brienne
