= Panker =

- Municipality
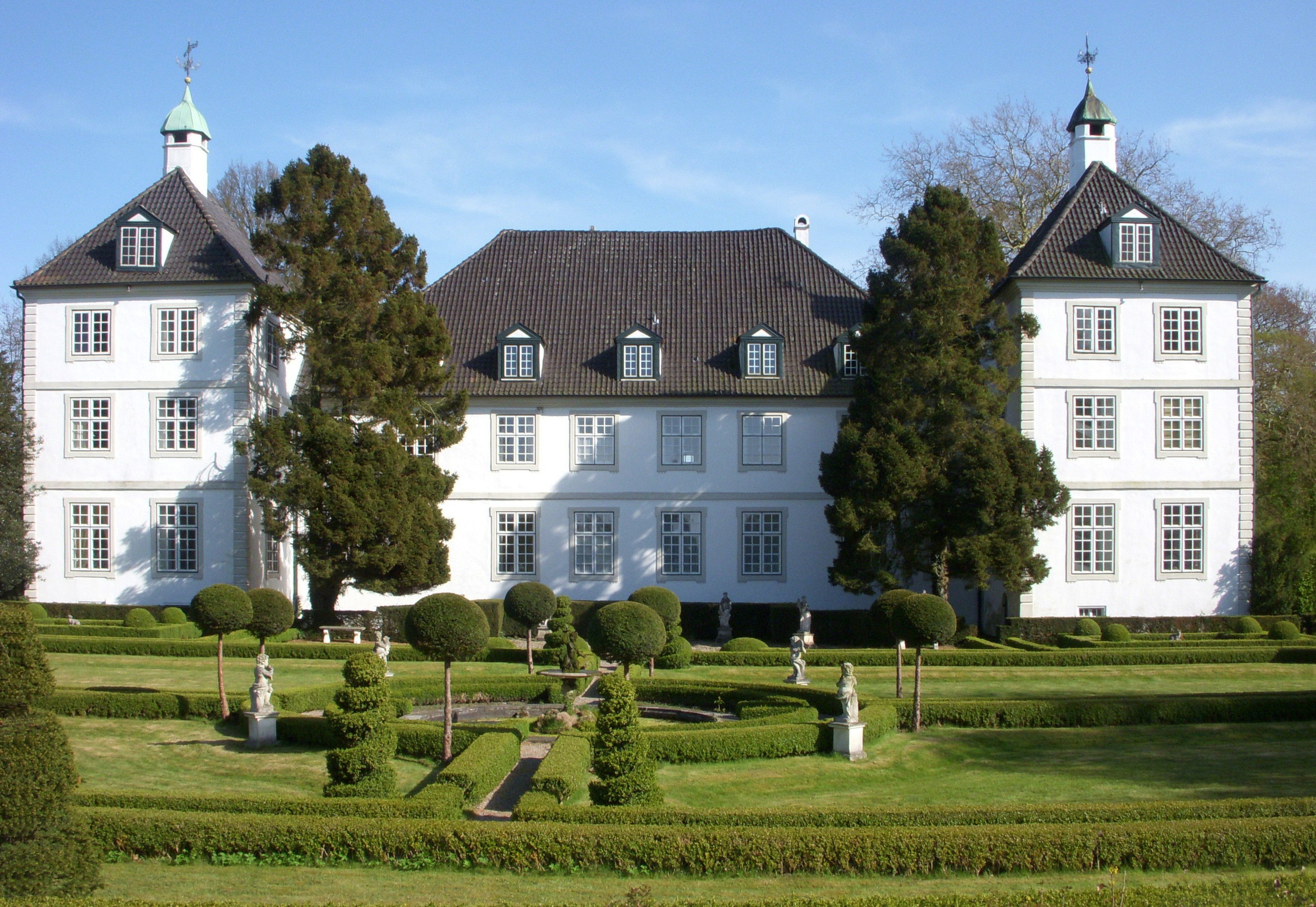
- Panker estate, Gut Panker

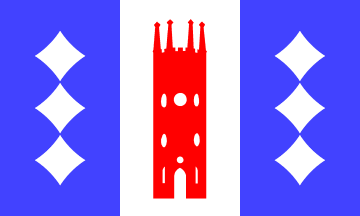
- Flag Coat of arms

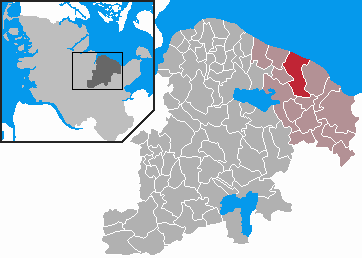
- Location of Panker within Plön district
- Interactive map of Panker
- Location within Germany Location within Schleswig-Holstein
- Coordinates: 54°19′N 10°34′E
- Country: Germany
- State: Schleswig-Holstein
- District: Plön
- Municipal assoc.: Lütjenburg

Government
  - Mayor: Olaf Arnold

Area
  - Total: 22.8 km^{2} (8.8 sq mi)
- Elevation: 55 m (180 ft)

Population (2025-12-31)
  - Total: 1,452
  - Density: 63.7/km^{2} (165/sq mi)
- Time zone: UTC+01:00 (CET)
  - Summer (DST): UTC+02:00 (CEST)
- Postal codes: 24321
- Dialling codes: 04381
- Vehicle registration: PLÖ

Panker (German pronunciation: [ˈpaŋkɐ]) is a municipality in Plön county, Schleswig-Holstein, Germany.

The municipality of Panker includes the villages Darry, Gadendorf, Matzwitz, Satjendorf, Todendorf and Panker estate. The nearest city is Luetjenburg.

Panker was first mentioned in 1433 as "Pankuren", a Slavic name.

== Panker estate ==
The noble Rantzau family owned this estate before it was sold to Frederick I, Landgrave of Hesse and King of Sweden, in 1739.

King Frederick I gave this and other estates to his illegitimate sons. The last surviving of these sons was Frederick William von Hessenstein, governor-general of Swedish Pomerania and, since 1772, Prince af Hessenstein in Sweden. When he died in 1808 without progeny, the issue of King Frederick went extinct, and Panker was placed into a trust in accordance with the Prince's testament. Accordingly, it passed to the Prince's first cousin once-removed, Prince Charles of Hesse-Kassel, governor-general of Schleswig-Holstein under Danish rule. Subsequent trustees included Charles' son and heir Prince Frederik of Hesse, who died in Panker in 1845.

Upon Frederik's death the Panker inheritance passed to the Rumpenheim lineage of the House of Hesse, half-Danish royalty. Frederick Charles of Hesse, the elected king of Finland, a scion of that Hesse family branch, was born in Panker in 1868.

The estate is located on the Baltic Sea. The villa was built around 1800. Nowadays it belongs to the Hessian House Foundation and serves as residence of some family members of the Rumpenheim line of landgraves of Hesse. The castle is not open to public.

== Villages in the municipality ==
=== Matzwitz ===
Matzwitz is a small village near the Landesstrasse 165. Many barnyards, farms and ranches were built along the short road through Matzwitz.

=== Darry ===
A kindergarten, a voluntary fire department and an elementary school are in Darry.

=== Todendorf ===
A flak range is in Todendorf - it is an outpost of the military training area in Putlos.

=== Gadendorf ===
Gadendorf has a voluntary fire department.

=== Satjendorf ===
A voluntary fire department is in Satjenburg.
