= Anders Fredrik Skjöldebrand =

His Excellency The High Well-born Count Anders Fredrik Skjöldebrand Lord of the Realm
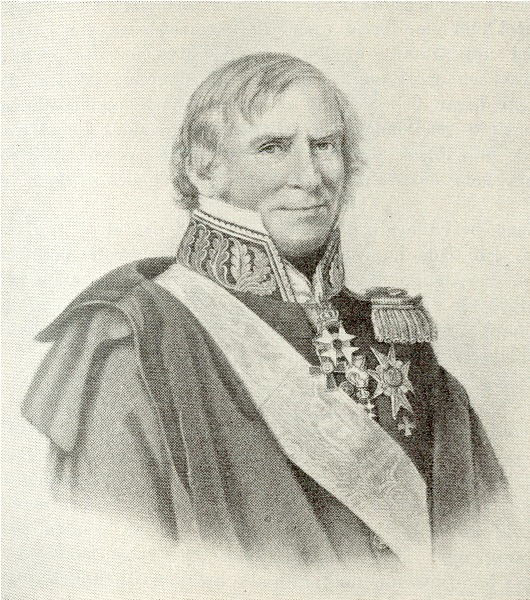
- Born: 14 July 1757; Algiers, Regency of Algiers, Ottoman Empire
- Died: 23 August 1834 (aged 77); Stockholm, Sweden
- Spouse: Charlotta Skjöldebrand
- Military career
- Allegiance: Sweden
- Branch: Swedish Army
- Service years: 1774-1814
- Rank: General
- Units: East Gothic Cavalry; South Scanian Cavalry Regiment
- Commands: Swedish cavalry division
- Conflicts: Russo-Swedish War; Battle of Öland; Napoleonic Wars; War of the Sixth Coalition; Dano-Swedish War; Battle of Bornhöved; Swedish–Norwegian War
- Awards: Knight of the Royal Order of the Seraphim
- Other work: Governor of Stockholm; Member of the Royal Swedish Academy of Sciences; Director of the Royal Swedish Opera; Seat 18 of the Swedish Academy

Count Anders Fredrik Skjöldebrand (14 July 1757 in Algiers – 23 August 1834 in Stockholm) was a Swedish count, lord of the realm, general, statesman and minister from the Skjöldebrand dynasty. He was also a knight of the Royal Order of the Seraphim and a holder of seat 18 of the Swedish Academy.

== Life ==
He became a student in Uppsala in 1771, a cornet in the South Scanian Cavalry Regiment in 1774, and a lieutenant in the East Gothic Cavalry in 1774.

At the start of the Russo-Swedish War he fought at the early battles in Sweden, including one at Karlskrona, then in 1789 he was ordered to accompany the fleet as a staff-adjutant to his friend Duke Karl, who had also been his commander early in his military career. He fought in the 1789 sea battle of Öland and then in 1810 was appointed Governor of Stockholm in connection with the murder of Axel von Fersen, helping to restore calm in the Swedish capital and contributing to various charitable and social initiatives, including one for improved childcare. He held the post until 1812, when he resigned from it after a dispute with the magistrate.

Also from 1810 to 1812 he was director of the Royal Theatre. He then won a victory at the Battle of Bornhöved in 1813 and participated in the 1814 war on Norway, and became one of the early sponsors of Bernadotte's candidacy for the Swedish throne.

In 1819, he was made a member of the Royal Swedish Academy of Sciences.

He was married to Charlotte Ennes.

== Sources ==
- Nordisk familjebok

Cultural offices
Preceded by Nils Lorens Sjöberg	Swedish Academy, Seat No 18; 1822–1834	Succeeded by Pehr Henrik Ling
