= Russian–German Legion =

Russian unit of the Napoleonic Wars (1812–15)

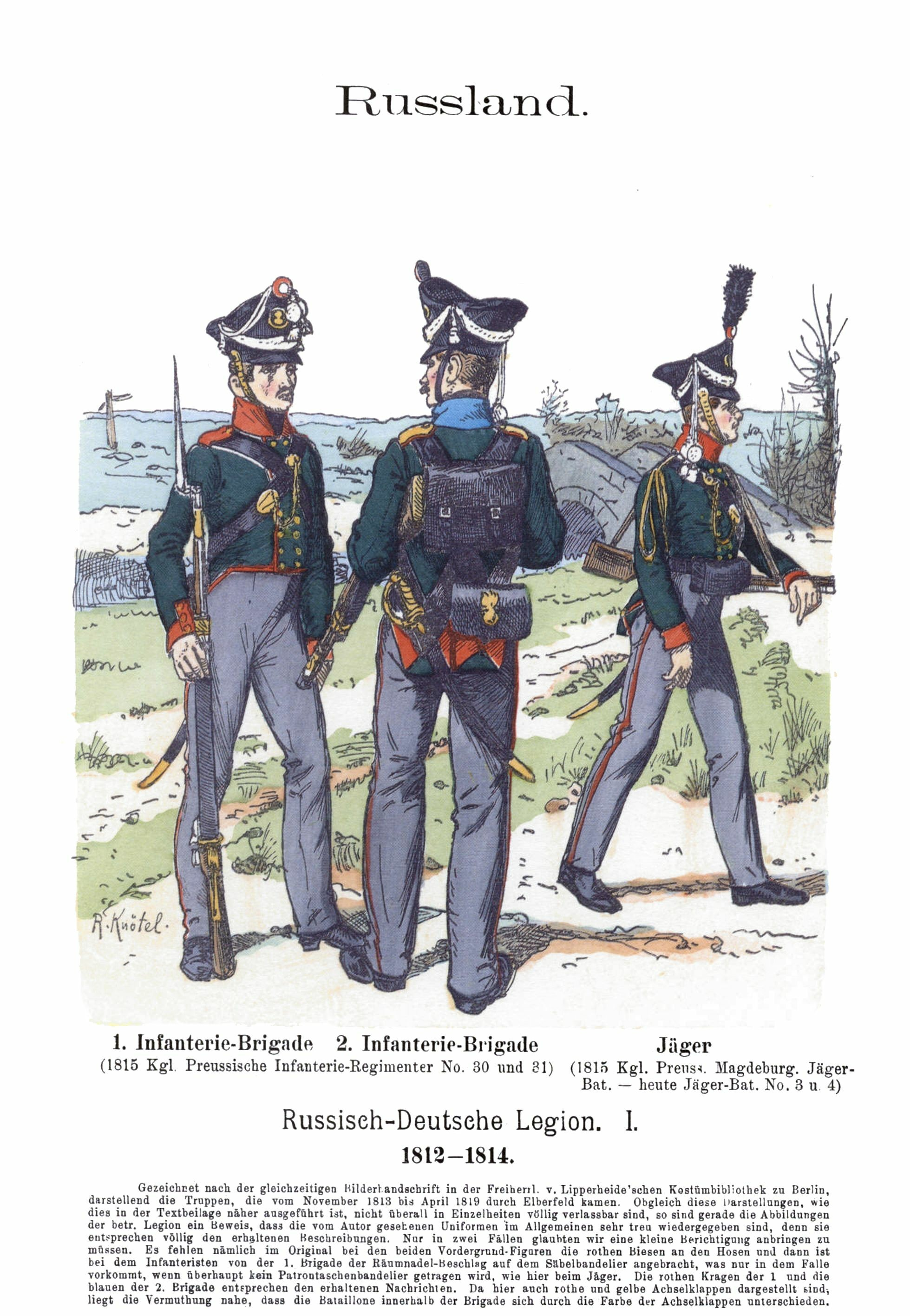
Soldier of the 1st infantry brigade, 2nd infantry brigade and Jäger

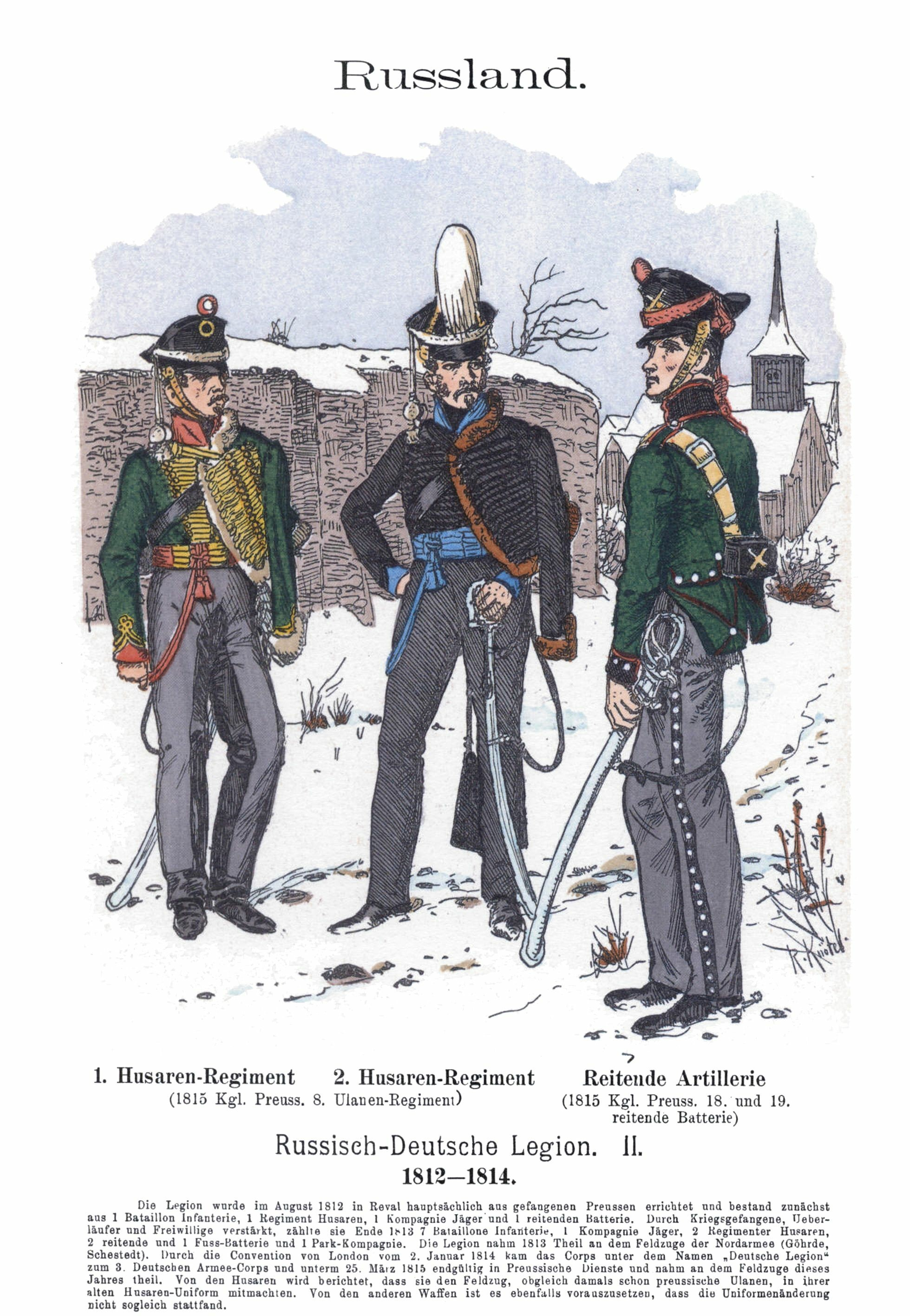
Soldier of the 1st hussar regiment, 2nd hussar regiment and horse artillery

The Russian–German Legion was a military formation of the Imperial Russian Army raised in August 1812 in Reval by Peter I, Grand Duke of Oldenburg after being instigated by Alexander I of Russia.

== Formation ==
Its first commander was Oberst von Arentsschild, and it was formed from non-French prisoners and deserters left behind in Russia during and after the French invasion earlier that year. Although called the "Russo-German Legion", the legion included Dutchmen and Belgians, who were also called up to join. Those prisoners of war wanting to join, were enlisted in the rank they had held in the French army. It also consisted of patriotic Germans.

It was formed to fight against Napoleon as part of the Imperial Russian army, but was paid by Russia's ally, Great Britain. Ernst Moritz Arndt, the private secretary to the pro-Russian Heinrich Friedrich Karl vom und zum Stein, acted as head propagandist to entrants to the Legion. He stayed in Saint Petersburg from 1812 onwards and attracted entrants by winning them over to fight to liberate Germany from its French occupying forces.

=== Structure ===
Originally of one infantry battalion, one hussar regiment, one jager company and one horse battery by the end of 1813 the Russian–German Legion was 9,379 strong in total and consisted of seven infantry battalions, one company of Jägers, two regiments of hussars, two batteries of horse artillery and one foot battery and park company. An eighth battalion was planned but not formed.

The legion was originally equipped by the Russians (see images) and the Hussar regiment was recorded as still dressed as such during the Hundred Days Campaign. Richard Knotel presumed the other arms were still wearing the old uniforms, but cloth was supplied to the infantry regiments.

Carl von Clausewitz, Ernst Moritz Arndt, Heinrich Friedrich Karl vom und zum Stein are some notable names and people that helped carry the Russo-German Legion.

== Campaigns ==
On 6 July 1813, after the Treaty of Peterswaldau, Great Britain received the task of providing for the Russian–German Legion and thus acquired the right to determine how, when and where it was to be deployed. At first, the Legion was directed southwards, where it became clear it was to be united with a Russian Corps and be deployed against the Prussians, with whom the Russians were still at war. A staff officer, Major Lager van Koch, then rode off to the Russian headquarters in Konigsberg, where he had an audience with the Czar. He soon returned with the order to march to Germany. Ludwig von Wallmoden-Gimborn was now put in command, and the Legion ventured to the lower Elbe, fought at the Battle of the Göhrde and at Sehestedt, attacked Harburg and marched far as the Netherlands. In mid March 1814 it crossed the Rhine and fought in Flanders in order to blockade Antwerp.

After returning from France in 1814, the Legion was received by Prussia, where collaborators were viewed critically, and any non-German personnel were discharged, and so on 2 June 1814 it was renamed the German Legion. The Legion moved to Kurhessen for exercises in 1814 and from then until 1815 took up quarters in the Bergischen.

After Napoleon's return from Elba on 26 February 1815, the soldiers of this unit were merged into the 30th and 31st infantry regiment, 8th (Russisch-Deutsche Legion) Ulanenregiment and 18th and 19th horse-artillery batteries of the Prussian army. These units took part in the Waterloo campaign, known as the Hundred Days, as part of the III Corps of the Prussian Army.

Several Dutch members of the Russo-German Legion had been decorated for valour. Already in 1814, several of them were given permission to wear their medals. In 1821, the members of the Legion were awarded the Russian Service Medal for the wars of 1813–1814, and also given permission to wear this decoration.

== Sources ==
- Schröder, Karl (2002). Eitorf unter den Preußen (in German). Heimatverein Eitorf. ISBN 3-87710-321-9.
- Helmert, Heinz; Usczeck, Hansjürgen (1986). Europäische Befreiungskriege 1808 bis 1814/15 (in German) (3rd ed.). Berlin. OCLC 3362007.
