= Ludwig von Wallmoden-Gimborn =

Austrian general (1769–1862)

Graf Ludwig von Wallmoden-Gimborn
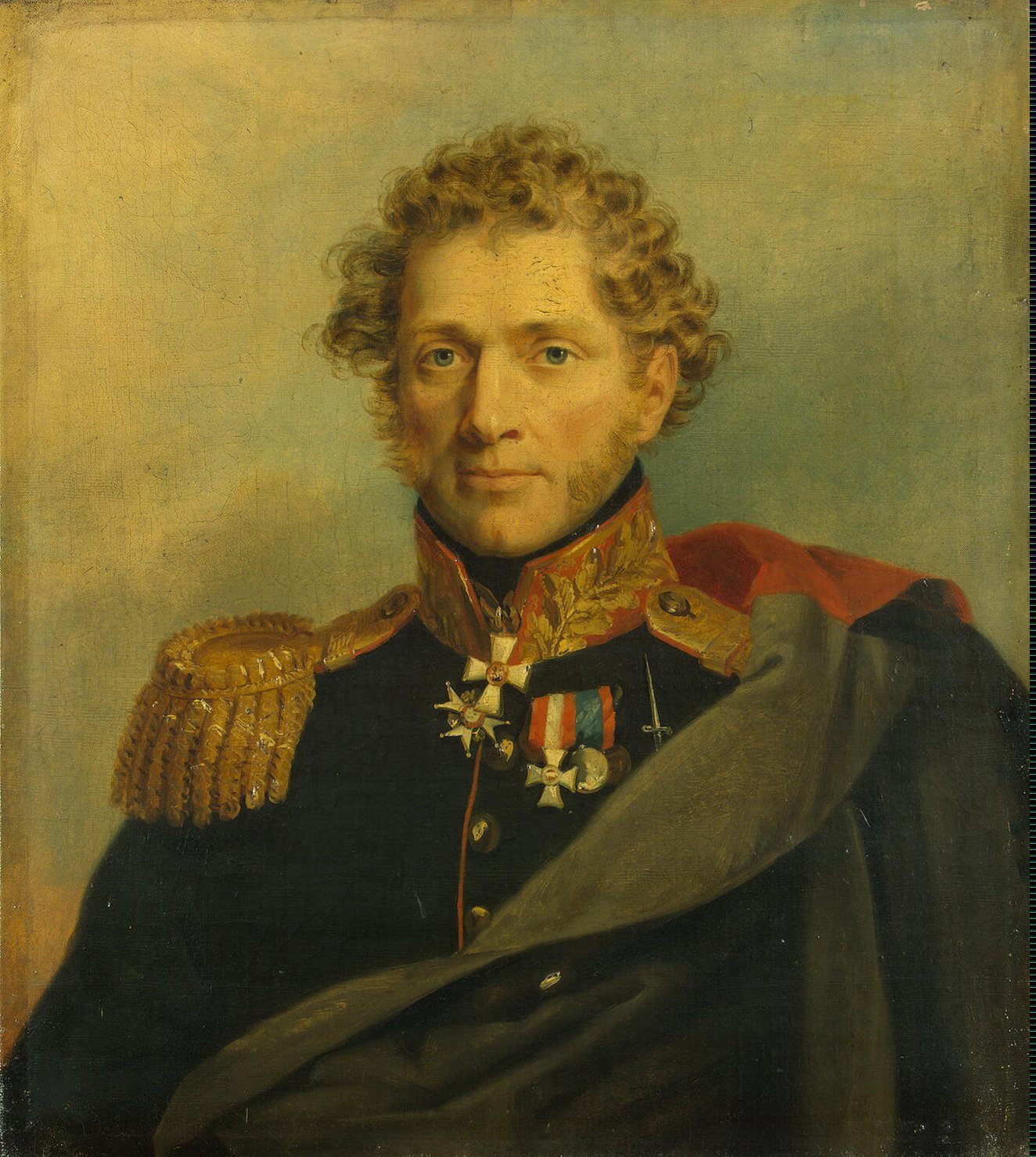
- Portrait by George Dawe
- Born: Ludwig Georg Thedel Graf von Wallmoden; 6 February 1769; Vienna, Habsburg monarchy
- Died: 22 March 1862 (aged 93); Vienna, Austrian Empire
- Military career
- Allegiance: (Electorate of Brunswick-Lüneburg) Hanover (Kingdom of Prussia) Prussia; Austrian Empire; Russian Empire
- Service years: 1790–1848
- Rank: Befehlshaber
- Conflicts: War of the Fifth Coalition; Battle of Wagram; French invasion of Russia; War of the Sixth Coalition; Battle of the Göhrde; Battle of Sehested; Siege of Hamburg; Neapolitan War

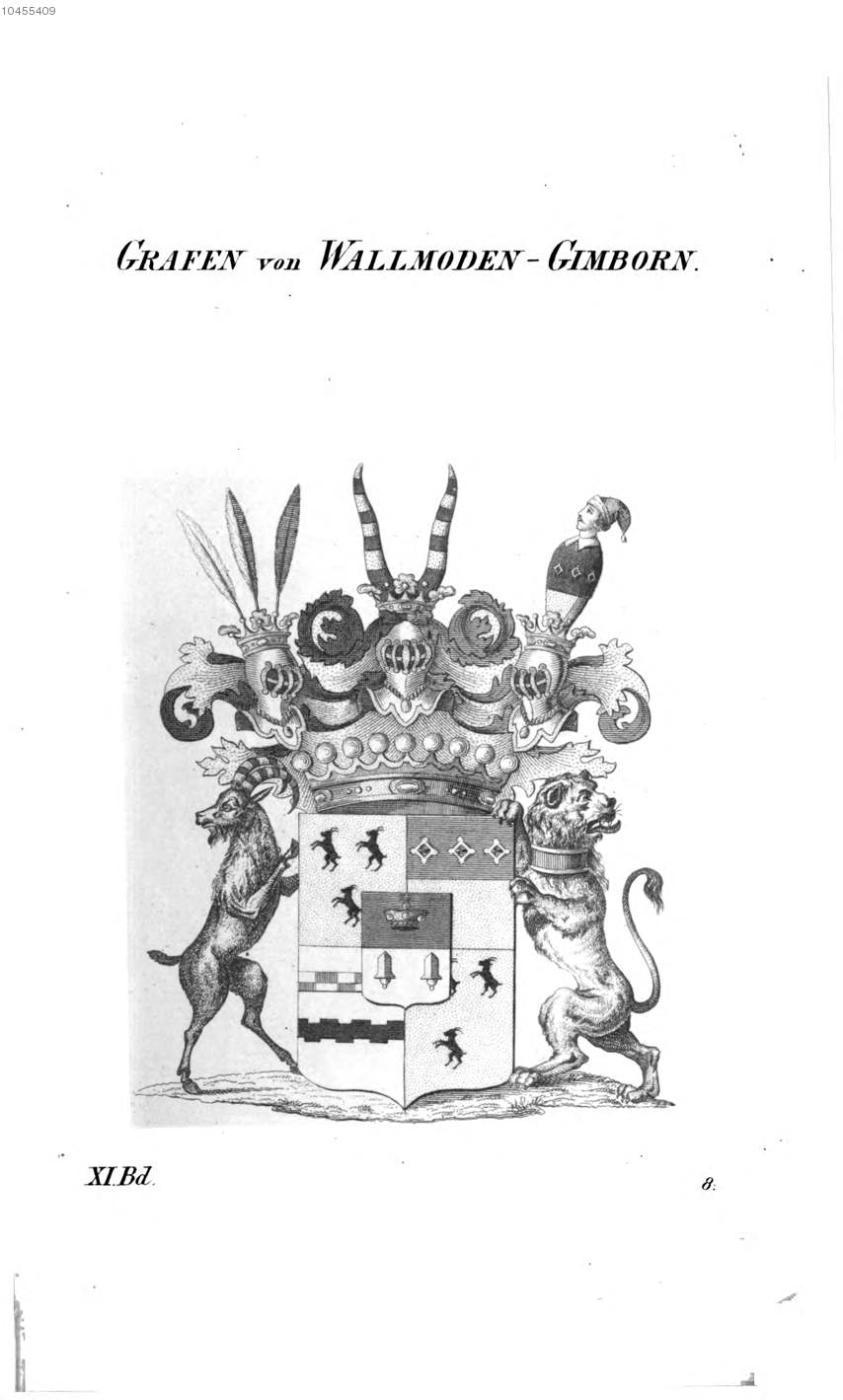
Arms of the Count von Wallmoden-Gimborn

Ludwig Georg Thedel Graf von Wallmoden (6 February 1769 – 22 March 1862) was an Austrian General of the Cavalry at services in various states, best known for his training of light infantry and the refinement of the Tirailleur system. As a grandson of George II of Great Britain and first cousin of George III, he is perhaps the only individual from that generation to have been photographed, within the broader British royal family.

== Early life and ancestry ==
Born into the House of Wallmoden, he was the second son of Johann Ludwig Reichsgraf von Wallmoden-Gimborn (1736–1811) and his first wife, Charlotte Christiane Auguste Wilhelmine von Wangenheim (1740–1783). At the time of Ludwig's birth, his father was British ambassador in Austria. Johann was an illegitimate son of George II of Great Britain by his mistress Amalie von Wallmoden. She was married to Adam Gottlieb, Count Wallmoden (1704–1752), but for a payment of 1000 Ducats the Count was prepared to defer his claims on his wife to George, and was finally separated from her in 1740.

== Biography ==
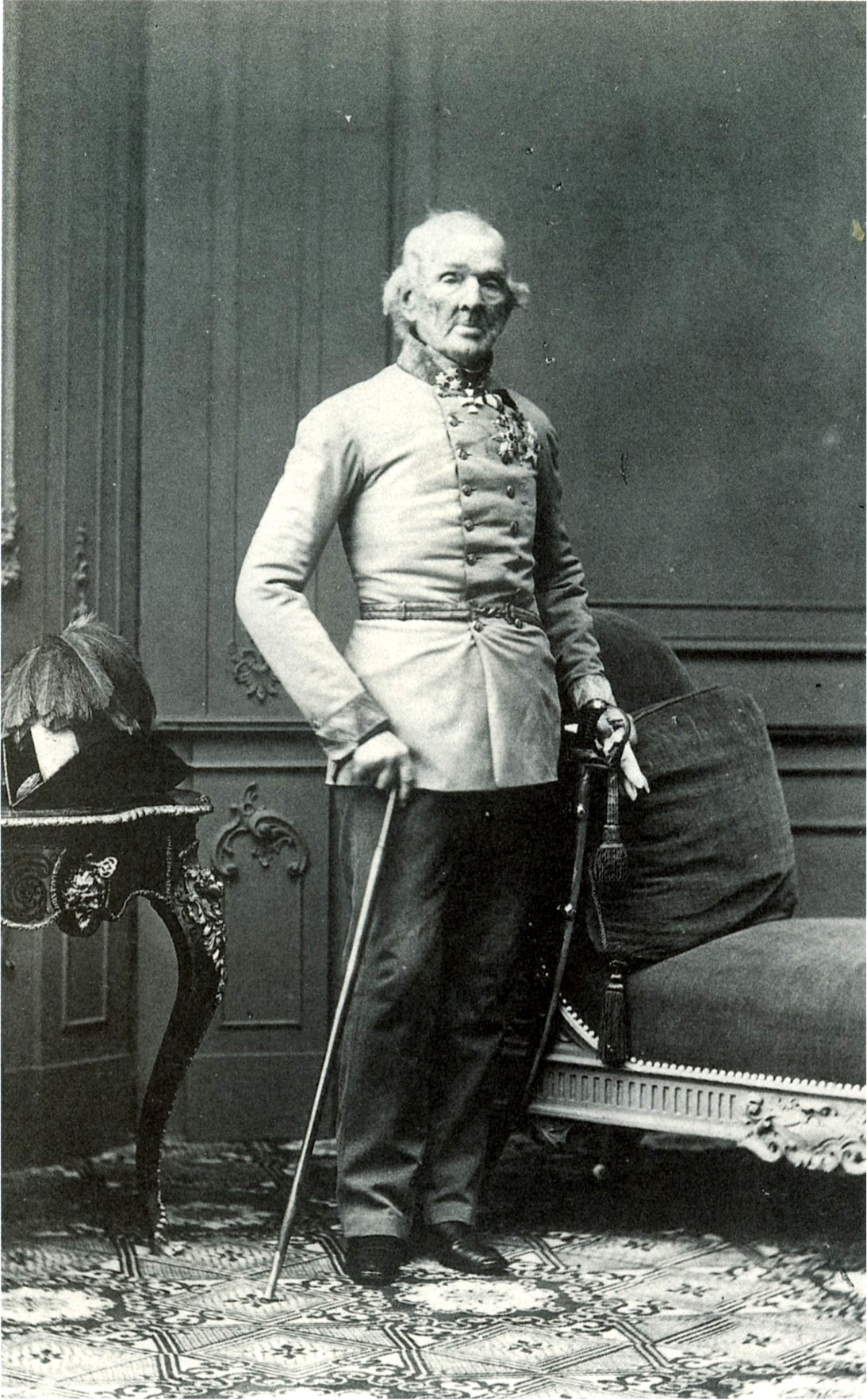
Ludwig von Wallmoden-Gimborn, by Ludwig Angerer, 1860

Wallmoden first entered the Hanoverian Army, and then in 1790 the Prussian Army. While serving in the Prussian army as a captain in Wolfradt's hussars he distinguished himself at the battle of Kaiserslautern winning the Pour le Mérite but was simultaneously bayoneted in the chest.

After the Peace of Basel (5 April 1795) Wallmoden joined the Austrian army as second captain in Vecsey's Hussars. On 1 January 1797 he was promoted to first captain and joined Karaczay-Chevaulegers. On 16 April that year he was promoted to major and joined the quartermaster service. On 7 June 1798 he was transferred to the Dragoon Regiment No. 2. On 3 August of the same year he was promoted to lieutenant colonel in Ulanenregimente No. 1 and to colonel of the same regiment on 16 August 1800.

In 1809 Wallmoden completed the negotiations in London as to the "Subsidienvertrag" between Austria and Great Britain. On his return to Vienna, he distinguished himself a brigadier-general at the Battle of Wagram. On 6 July, the second day of battle, Wallmoden was responsible for the left flank of the III Corps. He ordered an attack by the Liechtenstein Hussars who were on the enemy's right flank, which succeeded in disrupting the enemy and in the capture of nine guns. During the withdrawal of the Austrian army to Moravia, the VI Corps formed the rearguard. Wallmoden led the Liechtenstein and Blankenstein Hussars in a successful delaying action at Hollabrunn (9 July) and on several other occasions. During these regard actions he was lightly wounded and for his achievements at Wagram and in the latter actions he was awarded the Knight's Cross of the Order of Maria Theresia and army Command from 13 July 1809.

After the Treaty of Vienna, Wallmoden was promoted to Feldmarschallleutnant on 21 August 1809 and lived in Prague. In 1812 he was given permission by the Austrian Emperor to transfer first to the British Army, and then at the bequest of the British to the Imperial Russian Army, becoming overall commander of the Russian light troops under the commanders Dörnberg and Tettenborn and Chernichev, which became known as the Russian-German Legion, which he merged into the Allied "army of the north". During the Battle of the Göhrde, he and his corps held out against not only General Davout's force but also the French division under Pécheux, later penetrating into Schleswig and forcing the Danes to make peace.. The corps was disbanded upon the fall of Paris in 1814 and on 24 May 1815, Wallmoden rejoined the Austrian army, just in time for the Hundred Days in which he led a column of the Austrian III Corps (Württemberg's) which fought the action at Seltz against the French General Rottembourg, after which his column combined with the other column of the III Corps and fought the Battle of La Suffel before besieging General Jean Rapp in Strasbourg.

In August 1816 he was made Oberbefehlshaber (supreme commander) of the Austrian troops sent to the kingdom of Naples for the Neapolitan War. In 1821 he left the majority of the Austrian force in Naples and in June occupied Sicily, where he remained until 1823.

When in 1827 Naples was completely evacuated by the Austrian troops, Wallmoden became on 21 March 1827 Militärcommandant to Milan and he was made a secret counsel on 20 January 1831. On 18 September 1838, he was promoted to General of the Cavalry. On 1 March 1848, he was appointed deputy to Field Marshal Count Radetzky and on 19 October 1848 he was awarded the Grand Cross of the Austrian Order of Leopold in retirement. After his retirement he lived in Vienna and, after falling and breaking his leg, he died there in his 94th year on 20 March 1862, leaving no known issue.

== See also ==
- Wallmoden family
