= Friedrich Karl von Tettenborn =

Austrian and Russian military commander (1778–1845)

Freiherr Friedrich Karl von Tettenborn
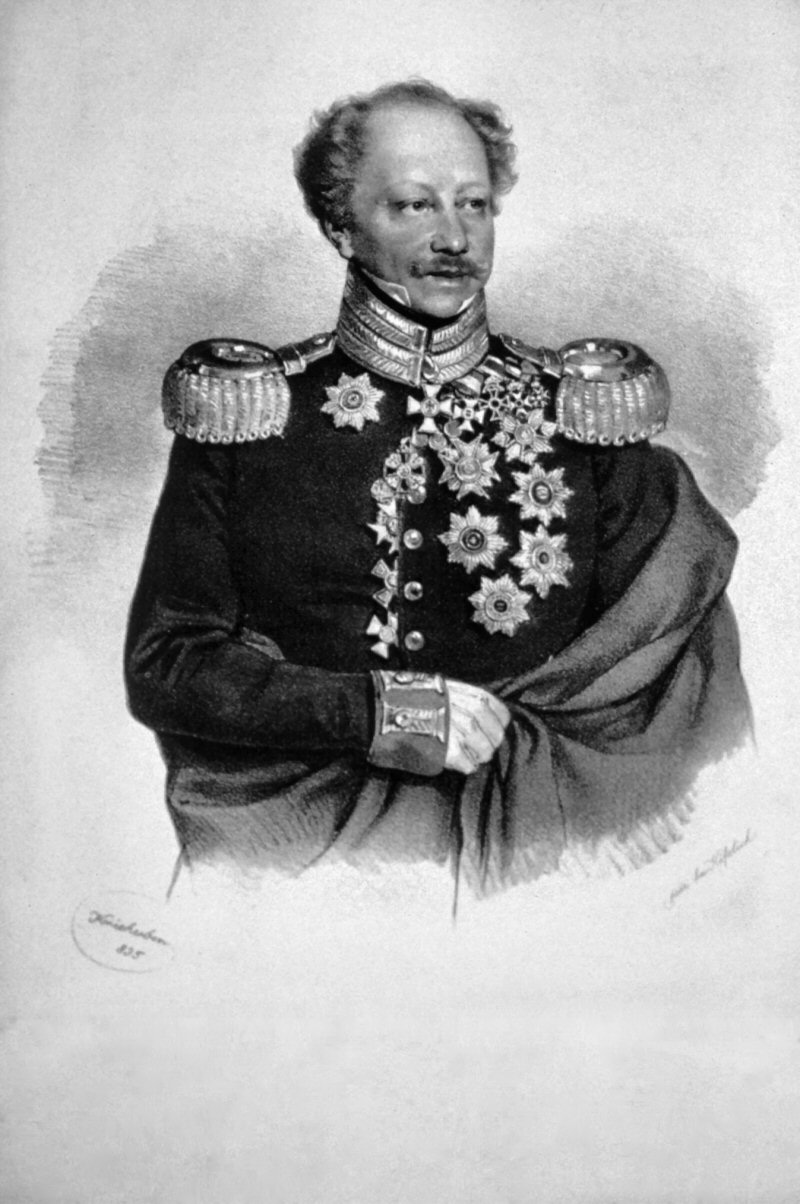
- Born: 19 February 1778; County of Sponheim, Holy Roman Empire
- Died: 9 December 1845 (aged 67); Vienna, Austrian Empire, German Confederation
- Resting place: Gräberhain Währinger Park, Vienna
- Military career
- Allegiance: Holy Roman Empire; Austria; Russia; Baden
- Branch: Light cavalry
- Service years: 1794–1815
- Rank: Lieutenant general
- Conflicts: French Revolutionary Wars; Napoleonic Wars; Battle of Wagram; Invasion of Russia
- Other work: Envoy for Baden

Friedrich Karl Freiherr von Tettenborn (19 February 1778 – 9 December 1845) was a cavalry commander in the Austrian and Russian armies during the Napoleonic Wars.

== Life ==
Portrait by Josef Kriehuber, 1837

Tettenborn first studied forestry in Waltershausen and then at the Universities of Göttingen and Jena. In 1794, he joined the Austrian military and quickly rose to captain during the French Revolutionary Wars and Napoleonic Wars. In the Austro-French war, he was in 1805 in the army under Mack, which dispersed after raising the siege of Ulm. At the battle of Wagram (1809), he rose to the rank of major. After the Treaty of Schönbrunn he accompanied prince Schwarzenberg to Paris.

At the outbreak of the Russian war of 1812, he entered the Russian army as a lieutenant colonel. At the head of Kutuzov's vanguard, he was again the first to engage at Moscow, pursuing the French as far as the Beresina at the head of the light cavalry, raising the siege of Vilnius, going beyond the Neman River, chasing MacDonald through East Prussia and occupying Königsberg.

Appointed oberst, he crossed the Vistula and Oder, joined up with general Chernyshyov in Landsberg and then moved on Berlin. From there, he was dispatched to Hamburg, occupying it on 18 March 1813 after throwing back Morand at Bergedorf on the left bank of the Elbufer. Yet he had to leave the city to the advancing Davout on 30 May. His actions in Hamburg are judged critically. Fahl writes of von Tettenborn at this era "he observed Hamburg as a favourable location to enrich itself and to lead a straying life. He strove less for an earnest defence of the city than for collecting of an honorary award of 5,000 Friedriches d'or and for his appointment as an honorary citizen he was also the first honorary citizen of Hamburg."

He then fought under Wallmoden against Davout and against Pécheux, after whose defeat he took Bremen on 15 October. In January 1814 he was delegated to use a single corps of light cavalry to maintain communications between the many separate Allied armies operating in France.

After the peace, he withdrew to his estates, and in 1818 he left the service of Russia to join that of Baden. Here he resolved the territorial differences between Baden and Bayern and was active in the foundation of the constitution. In 1819 he went to Vienna as an envoy, where he died on 9 December 1845.

== Bibliography ==
- "Теттенборн, Фридрих-Карл" . Brockhaus and Efron Encyclopedic Dictionary (in Russian). 1906.
- Karl August Varnhagen von Ense: Geschichte der Kriegszüge des Generals Tettenborn, Stuttgart 1814
- Bernhard von Poten (1894). "Tettenborn, Karl Freiherr von" . Allgemeine Deutsche Biographie (in German). Vol. 37. Leipzig: Duncker & Humblot. pp. 596–605.
