= Prince Frederik of Hesse =

German-Danish prince and field marshal

Prince Frederik
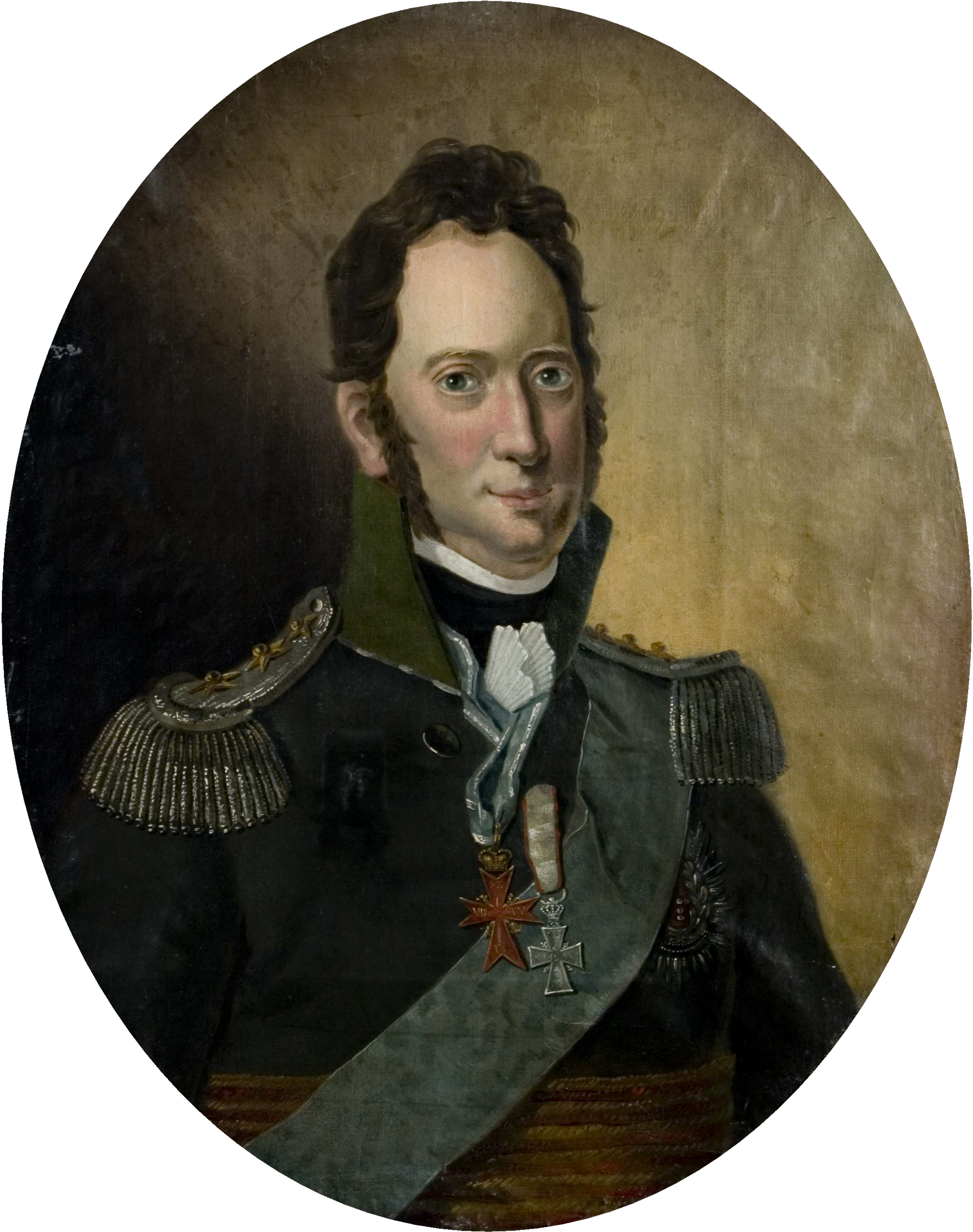
- Early 19th-century portrait
- Born: 24 May 1771; Gottorp Castle, Schleswig
- Died: 24 February 1845 (aged 73); Panker, Holstein
- Spouse: Clarelia Dorothea von Brockdorff
- House: Hesse-Kassel
- Father: Prince Charles of Hesse-Kassel
- Mother: Princess Louise of Denmark

Prince Frederik of Hesse, Landgrave Friedrich of Hesse-Cassel (24 May 1771 – 24 February 1845) was a Danish-German nobleman, General field marshal and governor-general of Norway (1810–1813) and the same in the duchies of Schleswig and Holstein (1836–1842).

== Early life and ancestry ==
He was born at Gottorp, into the Hesse-Kassel branch of the House of Hesse, as the eldest surviving son of Landgrave Charles of Hesse-Kassel and his wife, Princess Louise of Denmark, who was herself the youngest daughter of Frederick V of Denmark.

== Personal life ==
Prince Frederik married German noblewoman Clarelia Dorothea Klara von Brockdorff (divorced Baroness von Liliencron) in Norway on 21 May 1813. She was the only daughter of Detlev von Brockdorff and his second wife, Henriette Friederike von Blome, who was also his first cousin once removed.

Because her family did not belong to a small circle of ruling sovereign families, the marriage was a morganatic one, she could not share her husband's rank and title. This meant that she was not allowed to use the title of Princess of Hesse.

In 1803, Prince Frederik had a son with his mistress, Johanne Jansen. The son was named Christian Friederichsen (23 November 1803 in Moldened near the city of Schleswig - 29 August 1866 in Copenhagen, Denmark). By patent of 23 October 1819, Friederichsen was admitted to the Danish nobility with the name Løvenfeldt (Lovenfeldt) with seniority from 11 July 1815. He became major in the army and a royal Chamberlain.

== Career ==
Frederick was a close relative of the Dano-Norwegian royal family, and had a military career from a very young age. He became colonel already in 1778, major general in 1783 and lieutenant general in 1789. He headed the King's Regiment from 1795 to 1800, and from 1800 to 1808 Prince Frederick was governor in Rendsborg and inspector general for the footmen in the duchies of Schleswig and Holstein. In 1808 he was made general in the infantry. The following year, he was appointed to lead a Danish army from Zealand to Scania, as a part of the Dano-Swedish War. The campaign was dropped by the Danish government.

In July 1809 the prince was sent to serve in Norway. The reason was that the governor-general, Duke Christian August of Schleswig-Holstein-Sonderburg-Augustenburg was suspected to drop his loyalty to King Frederick VI in order to be adopted as the Swedish throne heir. Frederick was the commanding general in the southern part of the country. Christian August left Norway for Sweden on 7 January 1810, and Frederick became vice governor-general on 9 January. Frederick was an active governor-general. During his period in Norway, he also served as praeses of the Royal Norwegian Society for Development. However, King Frederick VI eventually felt the need to replace him with his heir, Crown Prince Christian Frederick, who assumed office on 23 May 1813. Around this time, Frederick also parted ways with his longtime aide-de-camp, Hans Henrik Rode.

In 1813–1814, the prince led the Danish Auxiliary Corps in Holstein. This was during the War of the Sixth Coalition, in which Denmark-Norway fought on the French side. The main task for his corps was to assist the forces of Louis-Nicolas Davout. When France suffered a loss at the Battle of Leipzig, Frederick's corps had to retreat, and in December 1813 he led his troops from Rostock to Rendsborg, saving the army from annihilation. He even led his troops to a victory in the Battle of Sehested on 10 December 1813. He then planned an attack on the Russian and Swedish occupational forces in Holstein. This attack was abandoned after the peace settlement between Sweden and Denmark-Norway, the Treaty of Kiel of 14 January 1814.

From 1815 to 1818, the prince led the Danish occupational forces in France. After returning home, he was once again made commanding general in Schleswig and Holstein, and governor of Rendsborg. From 1836 to 1842 he served as governor-general over Schleswig and Holstein, succeeding his late father Charles. Frederick was also promoted to General field marshal. He had been decorated with the Order of the Elephant in 1801 and became a Grand Commander of the Order of the Dannebrog after his success in 1813. Prince Frederick spent his last years at the family estate Panker by the Baltic Sea. He died here in February 1845.

== Ancestry ==
Ancestors of Prince Frederik of Hesse

16. Charles I, Landgrave of Hesse-Kassel
8. William VIII, Landgrave of Hesse-Kassel
17. Princess Maria Amalia of Courland
4. Frederick II, Landgrave of Hesse-Kassel
18. Moritz Wilhelm, Duke of Saxe-Zeitz
9. Duchess Dorothea Wilhelmina of Saxe-Zeitz
19. Princess Marie Amalie of Brandenburg
2. Landgrave Charles of Hesse-Kassel
20. George I of Great Britain
10. George II of Great Britain
21. Sophia Dorothea of Celle
5. Princess Mary of Great Britain
22. John Frederick, Margrave of Brandenburg-Ansbach
11. Caroline of Ansbach
23. Princess Eleonore Erdmuthe of Saxe-Eisenach
1. Prince Frederick of Hesse
24. Frederick IV of Denmark
12. Christian VI of Denmark
25. Duchess Louise of Mecklenburg-Güstrow
6. Frederick V of Denmark
26. Christian Heinrich, Margrave of Brandenburg-Bayreuth-Kulmbach
13. Margravine Sophie Magdalene of Brandenburg-Kulmbach
27. Countess Sophie Christiane of Wolfstein
3. Princess Louise of Denmark
28. George I of Great Britain (= 20)
14. George II of Great Britain (= 10)
29. Sophia Dorothea of Celle (= 21)
7. Princess Louise of Great Britain
30. John Frederick, Margrave of Brandenburg-Ansbach (= 22)
15. Caroline of Ansbach (= 11)
31. Princess Eleonore Erdmuthe of Saxe-Eisenach (= 23)
