= List of Swedish cavalry regiments =

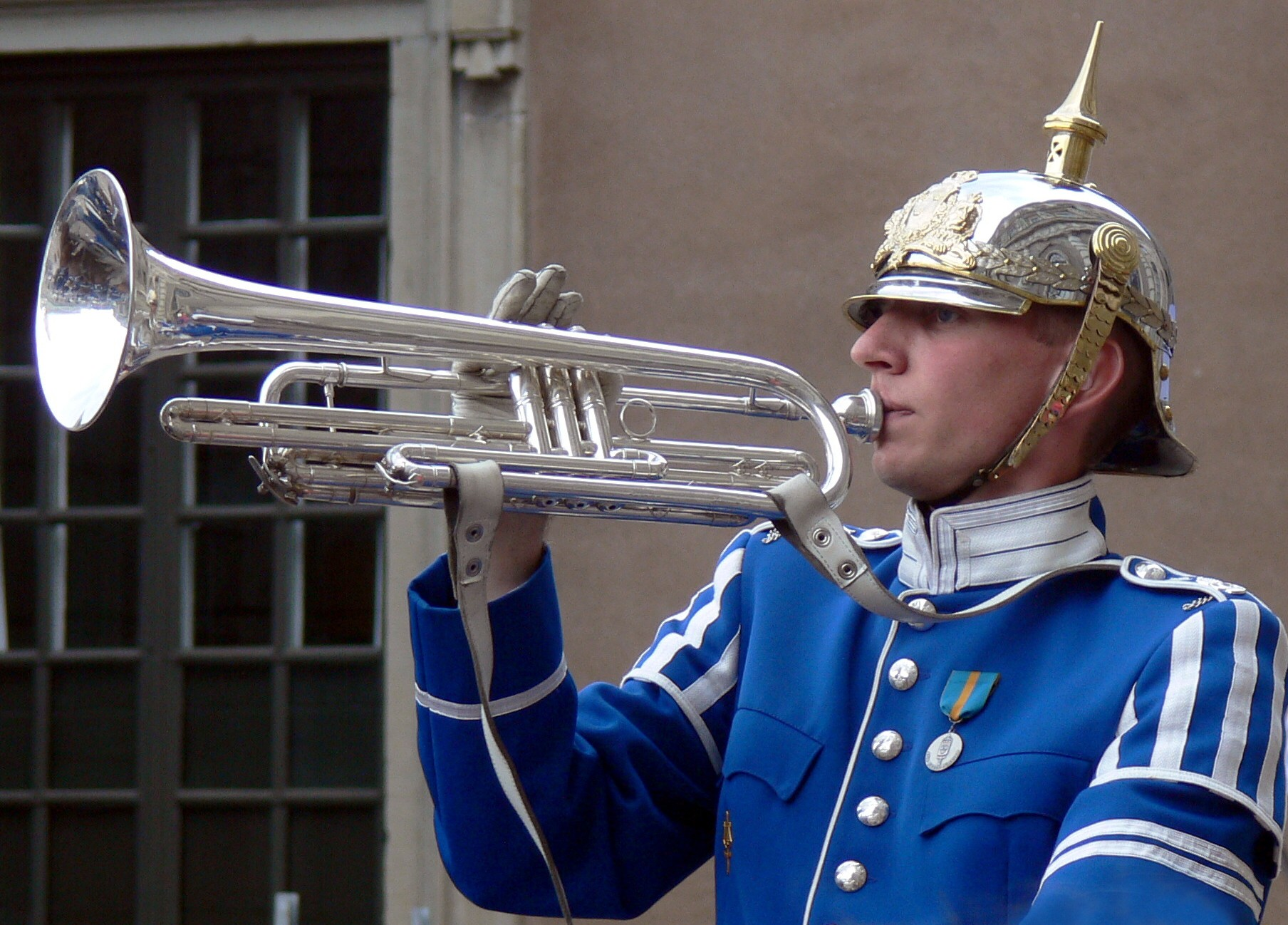
A member of the Life Guards' Dragoon Music Corps.

This is a list of Swedish cavalry regiments, battalions, corps and companies that have existed in the Swedish Army. They are listed in three ways, first by the actual units that have existed, then by the various names these units have had, and last by the various designations these units have had.

== By unit ==
- Adelsfanan (1571–1901)
- Aschebergska regementet (1674–1720)
- Blå (Putbusska) husarregemenetet (1762–1766)
- Bohus dragonbataljon (1679–1720)
- Bohus-Jämtlands kavalleribataljon (1661–1670)
- Bohusläns dragonregemente (1727–1776)
- Bohusläns kavalleri- och dragonregemente (1720–1727)
- Bohusläns kavallerikompani (1670–1674)
- Bohusläns lätta dragonregemente (1776–1791)
- Cederströmska husarregementet (1816–1822)
- Finska lätta dragonkåren (1770–1772)
- Gula (Wrangelska) husarregementet (1762–1766)
- Gröna dragonerna (1675–1679)
- Hornska husarregementet (1797–1801)
- Husarregementet (1766–1797)
- Husarregementet Konung Karl XV (1860–1882)
- Indelta livdragonregementet (1721–1791)
- Jämtlands hästjägarkår (1830–1893)
- Karelska dragonkåren (1743–1780)
- Karelska dragonregementet (1735–1743)
- Karelska dragonskvadronen (1724–1735)
- Karl XII:s Drabantkår (1700–1718)
- Konungens värvade husarregemente (1859–1860)
- Kronprinsens husarregemente (1822–1859, 1882–1927)
- Livhusarregementet (1793–1797)
- Livregementet till häst (1667–1791)
- Livregementets dragonkår (1815–1893)
- Livregementets husarkår (1815–1893)
- Livregementsbrigadens kyrassiärkår (1791–1815)
- Livregementsbrigadens lätta dragonkår (1791–1815)
- Lätta dragonerna av livgardet (1772–1793)
- Lätta livdragonregementet (1797–1806)
- Mörnerska husarregementet (1801–1816)
- Norra skånska kavalleriregementet (1686–1801)
- Nylands lätta dragonkår (1803–1805)
- Nylands lätta dragonregemente (1805–1809)
- Nylands och Tavastehus dragonregemente (1721–1791)
- Nylands och Tavastehus läns kavalleriregemente (1632–1721)
- Riksänkedrottningens livregemente till häst (1674–1720)
- Skåne-Bohusläns dragonregemente (1670–1675)
- Skånska linjedragonregementet (1801–1807)
- Smålands kavalleriregemente (1684–1801)
- Smålands dragonregemente (1801–1822)
- Svenska husarregementet (1758–1762)
- Upplandsfanan (1536-1620)
- Upplands ryttare (1634–1667)
- Viborgs läns kavalleriregemente (1632–1724)
- Västgöta regemente till häst (1628–1655)
- Västgöta kavalleriregemente (1655–1802)
- Västgöta linjedragonregemente (1802–1806)
- Västgöta dragonregemente (1806–1811)
- Åbo och Björneborgs läns kavalleriregemente (1632–1721)
- Östgöta kavalleriregemente (1634–1791)

== By name ==
The original five Swedish provincial cavalry regiments:

- Svenska adelsfanan (Swedish Banner of Nobles)
- Livregementet till häst (Life Regiment of Horse)
- Smålands kavalleriregemente (Småland Cavalry Regiment)
- Östgöta kavalleriregemente (Östergötland Cavalry Regiment)
- Västgöta kavalleriregemente (Västergötland Cavalry Regiment)

The original three Finnish provincial cavalry regiments:

- Åbo och Björneborgs läns kavalleriregemente (Åbo and Björneborg Country Cavalry Regiment)
- Nylands och Tavastehus läns kavalleriregemente (Nyland and Tavastehus County Cavalry Regiment)
- Viborgs och Nyslotts läns kavalleriregemente (Viborg and Nyslott County Cavalry Regiment)

Later raised Swedish cavalry regiments:

- Bohusläns regemente (Bohuslän Regiment)
- Enspännarkompaniet (Carriage Company)
- Görtz dragonregemente (Görtz' Dragoon Regiment)
- Kronprinsens husarregemente (Crown Prince's Hussar Regiment)
- Livgardet till häst (Life Guards of Horse)
- Livdragonregementet (Life Dragoon Regiment)
- Livregementets husarer (Life Regiment's Hussars)
- Meijerfelts dragonregemente (Meijerfelt's Dragoon Regiment)
- Norrlands dragonregemente (Norrland Dragoon Regiment)
- Skånska dragonregementet (Scanian Dragoon Regiment)
- Skånska husarregementet (Scanian Hussar Regiment)
- Skånska kavalleriregementet (Scanian Cavalry Regiment)
- Stenbocks dragonregemente (Stenbock's Dragoon Regiment)

Later raised Finnish cavalry regiments:

- Finska adelsfanan (Finnish Banner of Nobles)
- Karelska lantdragonskvadronen (Karelian County Dragoon Squadron)

Later raised German cavalry regiments:

- Bremen-verdiska adelsfanan (Bremen-Verdian Banner of Nobles)
- Bremiska kavalleriregementet (Bremian Cavalry Regiment)
- Bremiska dragonregementet (Bremian Dragoon Regiment)
- Dragonregementet i Wismar (Dragoon Regiment in Wismar)
- Pommerska adelsfanan (Pomeranian Banner of Nobles)
- Pommerska dragonregementet (Pomeranian Dragoon Regiment)
- Pommerska kavalleriregementet (Pomeranian Cavalry Regiment)
- Preussiska dragonregementet (Prussian Dragoon Regiment)
- Schlesiska dragonregementet (Silesian Dragoon Regiment)
- Schwerins dragonregemente (Schwerin's Dragoon Regiment)
- Tyska dragonregementet (German Dragoon Regiment)
- Verdiska dragonregementet (Verdian Dragoon Regiment)
- Vietinghoffs dragonregemente (Vietinghoff's Dragoon Regiment)

Later raised Baltic cavalry regiments:

- Estländska lantdragonskvadronen (Estonian County Dragoon Squadron)
- Estniska adelsfanan (Estonian Banner of Nobles)
- Estniska kavalleriregementet (Estonian Cavalry Regiment)
- Ingermanländska dragonregementet (Ingrian Dragoon Regiment)
- Laurentzens fridragoner (Laurentzen's Free Dragoons)
- Lewenhaupts frikompani (Lewenhaupt's Free Company)
- Livländska adelsfanan (Livonian Banner of Nobles)
- Livländsk dragonskvadron I (Livonian Dragoon Squadron I)
- Livländsk dragonskvadron II (Livonian Dragoon Squadron II)
- Livländskt dragonregemente I (Livonian Dragoon Regiment I)
- Livländskt dragonregemente II (Livonian Dragoon Regiment II)
- Öselska lantdragonskvadronen (Öselian County Dragoon Squadron)

Other later raised cavalry regiments:

- Benderska dragonregementet (Benderian Dragoon Regiment)
- Franska dragonregementet (French Dragoon Regiment)
- Polska regementet till häst (Polish Horse Regiment)
- Smiegelskis polska dragonkår (Smiegelski's Polish Dragoon Corps)

Later raised Swedish temporary cavalry regiments:

- Gotlands ståndsdragonkompani (Gotland Rank Dragoon Company)
- Skånska ståndsdragoner (Scanian Rank Dragoons)
- Skånska tremänningsregementet till häst (Scanian Third Man Horse Regiment)
- Upplands femmänningsregemente till häst (Uppland Fifth Man Horse Regiment)
- Upplands ståndsdragoner (Uppland Rank Dragoons)
- Upplands tremänningsregemente till häst (Uppland Third Man Horse Regiment)
- Västgöta ståndsdragoner (Västergötland Rank Dragoons)
- Västgöta tremänningsregemente till häst (Västergötland Third Man Horse Regiment)

Later raised Finnish temporary cavalry regiments:

- Finska ståndsdragonbataljonen (Finnish Rank Dragoon Battalion)
- Åbo, Nylands och Viborgs läns tremänningsregemente till häst (Åbo, Nyland and Viborg County Third Man Horse Regiment)
- Österbottens ståndsdragonkompani (Österbotten Rank Dragoon Company)

Later raised Baltic temporary cavalry regiments:

- Estniska ståndsdragonbataljonen (Estonian Rank Dragoon Battalion)
- Ingermanländska ståndsdragoner (Ingrian Rank Dragoons)
- Livländska ståndsdragonbataljonen (Livonian Rank Dragoon Battalion)
- Öselska ståndsdragonbataljonen (Ösel Rank Dragoon Battalion)

== By designation ==
- K 1 Livgardet till häst (1806–1927)
- K 1 Livregementet till häst (1928–1949)
- K 1 Livgardesskvadronen (1949–1975)
- K 1 Livgardets dragoner (1975–1985, 1994–2000)
- K 2 Livregementets dragoner (1893–1927)
- K 2 Skånska kavalleriregementet (1928–1942, 1946–1952)
- K 3 Livregementets husarer (1893– present)
- K 4 Smålands husarregemente (1822–1927)
- K 4 Norrlands dragonregemente (1928–1955, 1976–2005)
- K 4 Norrlands dragoner (1955–1976)
- K 5 Skånska husarregementet (1807–1927)
- K 6 Skånska dragonregementet (1822–1927)
- K 7 Kronprinsens husarregemente (1882–1927)
- K 8 Norrlands dragonregemente (1893–1927)

== See also ==
- List of Swedish regiments
- Military district (Sweden)
- List of Swedish defence districts
