= Life Guards of Horse =

Swedish Army regiment (1770-1928)

- Livgardet till häst
- Active: 1770–1927
- Country: Sweden
- Allegiance: Swedish Armed Forces
- Branch: Swedish Army
- Type: Cavalry
- Size: Regiment
- Part of: 4th Military District (1833–1893); 4th Army Division (1893–1901); VI Army Division (1902–1927)
- Garrison/HQ: Stockholm
- Colors: White and blue
- March: "Kavallerisignalmarsch" (A. Ericson)
- Anniversaries: 28 January

Life Guards of Horse (Swedish: Livgardet till häst, K 1) was a Swedish Army cavalry regiment, first raised in 1770. It saw service for two centuries, before being amalgamated with the Life Regiment Dragoons (K 2) to form the Life Regiment of Horse (K 1) in 1928.

== History ==
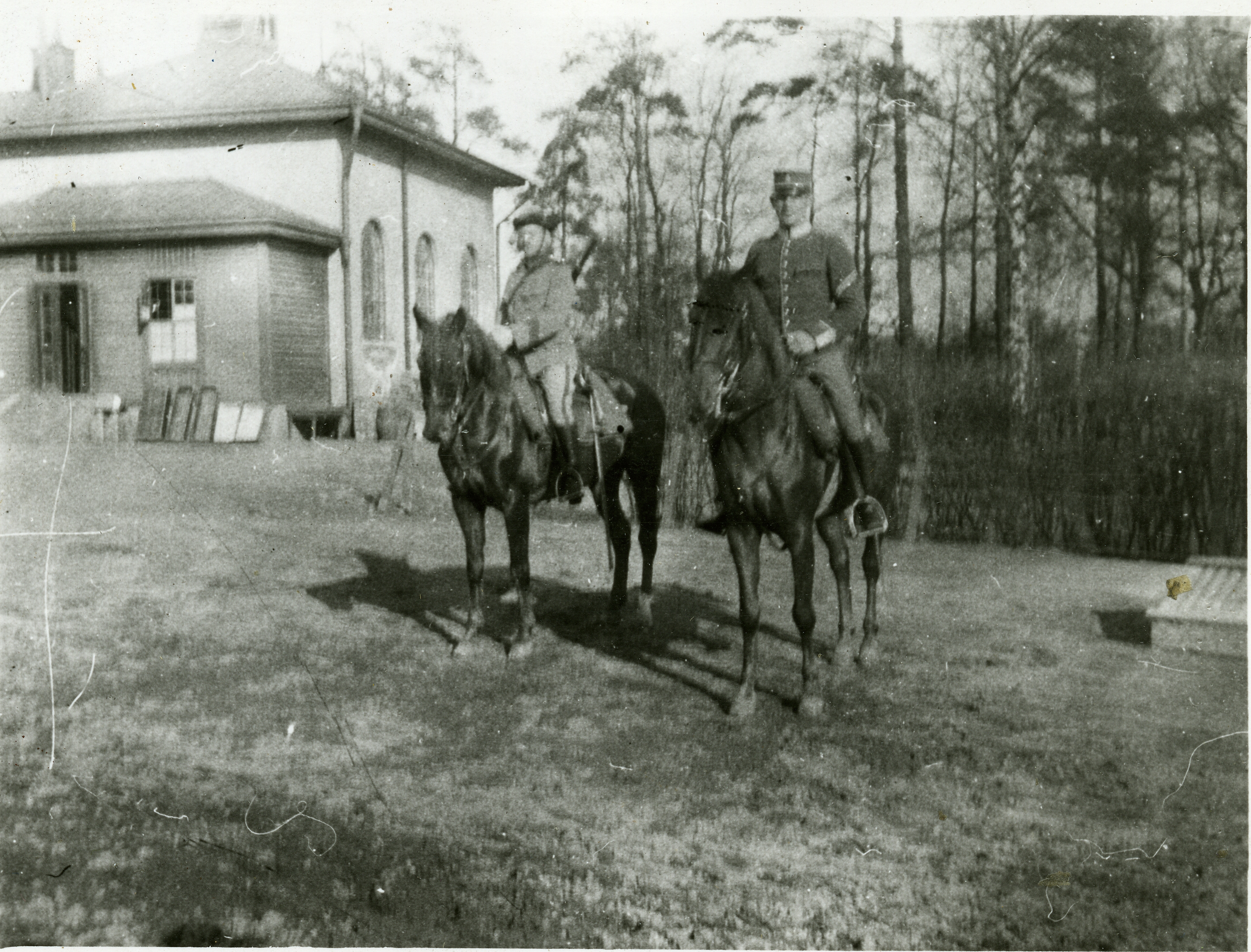
Soldiers of the regiment in 1915.

The regiment was raised on 20 February 1770 by Jacob Magnus Sprengtporten as the Finnish Light Dragoon Corps (Finska lätta dragonkåren). The unit was set up as a regular dragoon corps in Nyland County, Finland as a reinforcement of the border guard along the Kymmene River. The corps then consisted of 150 men and was based in Borgå.

In 1773 the corps was increased to 250 men (5 squadrons), and was given the name Life Guards of Horse (Livgardet till häst) and was based partly in Stockholm, partly in Borgå, Finland. In 1777, it was based in Stockholm, Södertälje, Enköping and Sigtuna. From 1811, the unit was only based in Stockholm.

After changing its name several times, in 1806 it got its present name. Its strength increased in 1815 to 375 men and in 1831 to 400 and in 1844 it was organized in 4 squadrons. In 1885, its staff comprised 23 officers, 13 civilian soldiers, 29 non-commissioned officers and trumpeters with the rank of non-commissioned officer, as well as 400 men with 384 number horses. From 1847 to 1888, the Life Guards of Horse together with Svea Life Guards and the 2nd Life Guard, constituted the Life Guards Brigade (Livgardesbrigaden).

A fifth squadron, taken from the Crown Prince's Hussar Regiment (K 7) was added to the regiment in September 1897. In 1928, the Life Guards of Horse was amalgamated with the Life Regiment Dragoons (K 2) and formed the Life Regiment of Horse (K 1).

== Barracks and training areas ==
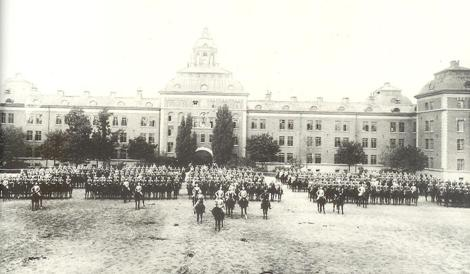
Barracks at Lidingövägen.

On 7 April 1811, the regiment was transferred to a newly erected barracks area at Storgatan 35-49 (Kvarteret Krubban) in Östermalm. The regiment thus became the first in Sweden to be placed in barracks. On 25 September 1897, the regiment moved to a newly erected barracks area (Life Guards Cavalry Barracks) on Lidingövägen, which was then called Sturevägen, designed by architect Erik Josephson.

== Uniforms ==
=== Dragoon uniforms ===
==== Miscellaneous ====
From the 17th century, dragoons had mainly been mounted infantry. From the middle of the 18th century this changed and around 1800 the cavalry was divided into heavy cavalry (cuirassiers and dragoons) and light cavalry (hussars and lancers). In Sweden only one dragoon unit remained after the Carolean era - the Bohuslän Dragoons. Not until 1772 was the next unit raised, the Light Dragoons of the Life Guards. The number was increased by another three regiments over a 30-year period. The uniform of these units were not homogeneous during the period and some of the units were soon reorganized into hussar regiments. The Bohuslän Dragoon Regiment became in 1776 a light dragoon regiment and reorganized in 1791 to infantry. During that time they kept, as the only unit in the Swedish Army, green on their uniforms. The Västgöta Cavalry Regiment became dragoons in 1792 but even this regiment was transferred to the infantry in 1811. All dragoon units had from 1772 yellow breeches of yellow wash leather, dark blue or grey greatcoat, black stock of woollen crepon and gauntlet gloves of yellow elk hide. Until 1809, officers wore a white brassard on the left upper arm. In 1781 came blue or grey gaiters with buttons in the outer seams and a drill jacket for everyday use. In 1792 epaulettes appeared when the gorget disappeared. In 1795 several units got a bicorne of black felt with agraffe, pom-pom and plume and for some regiments gold braid on the upper edge and a yellow barrel sash (of silk for officers).

==== Arms and strapping ====
In 1780 a new type of cartouche of black leather in a strap of chamois. The same applied in 1795 to the sabretache. The Light Dragoons of the Life Guards had already in 1786 got a pale blue sabretache with the small national coat of arms. The arms consisted of sabre for troopers, m/1808 och m/1814. The last model was in 1816 exchanged for a cavalry sword for all personnel in the Scanian Line Dragoon Regiment. New firearms during the period were the carbine m/1781 and dragoon rifle m/1794.

==== Special equipment ====
Light Dragoons of the Life Guards (1772)

The unit was in 1772 equipped with a jacket of white broadcloth with a pale blue plastron with double white buttonholes, and pale blue cuffs and a white collar with a pale blue braid on each side, a pale blue waistcoat edged with white, pale blue charivades edged with white, a sash barrelled in yellow, a hat of black felt with a cap badge and a yellow plume on the left side and black hessian boots with spurs. In 1779 came a coatee of white broadcloth with pale blue facing with stripes in white (officers silver), pale blue cuffs and shoulder tongues and a white collar. The hat was now of black felt with cap badge and a blue and yellow plume on left side. Black knee boots with spurs. After more than 20 years as dragoons the regiment in 1793 was transferred to a hussar regiment only to become dragoons again after just four years.

Light Life Dragoon Regiment (1797)

The jacket was white with pale blue facing with double white buttonholes and a white collar. The hat of black felt had a black brim, a standing white plume in the front, cap plate and cockade. This was already in 1798 changed to a hat of black felt with a yellow wing and black peak, white plume on the front, cap plate, cordon and banderole. In 1802 gaiters of pale blue broadcloth with a white stripe on the outer seam and a pale blue fourage cap with white lining.

Life Guards of Horse (1806)

In 1807 the regiment was issued a new white coatee of broadcloth with pale blue facing with white lacing. White collar and cuffs (full dress) and a pale blue jacket with white-edged pale blue facing. Pale blue trousers with lacing in the front and a stripe down the outer seam (officers silver, white for other ranks) and pale blue gaiters mounted with black leather. The hat was high and round of felt with a black horse hair crest, cap plate, white plume on the left side and cords (officers gold, trooper red) on the right. Already in 1810 this was exchanged for a shako of black leather with a cap plate and a white cordon front and back.

Uniform in 1772

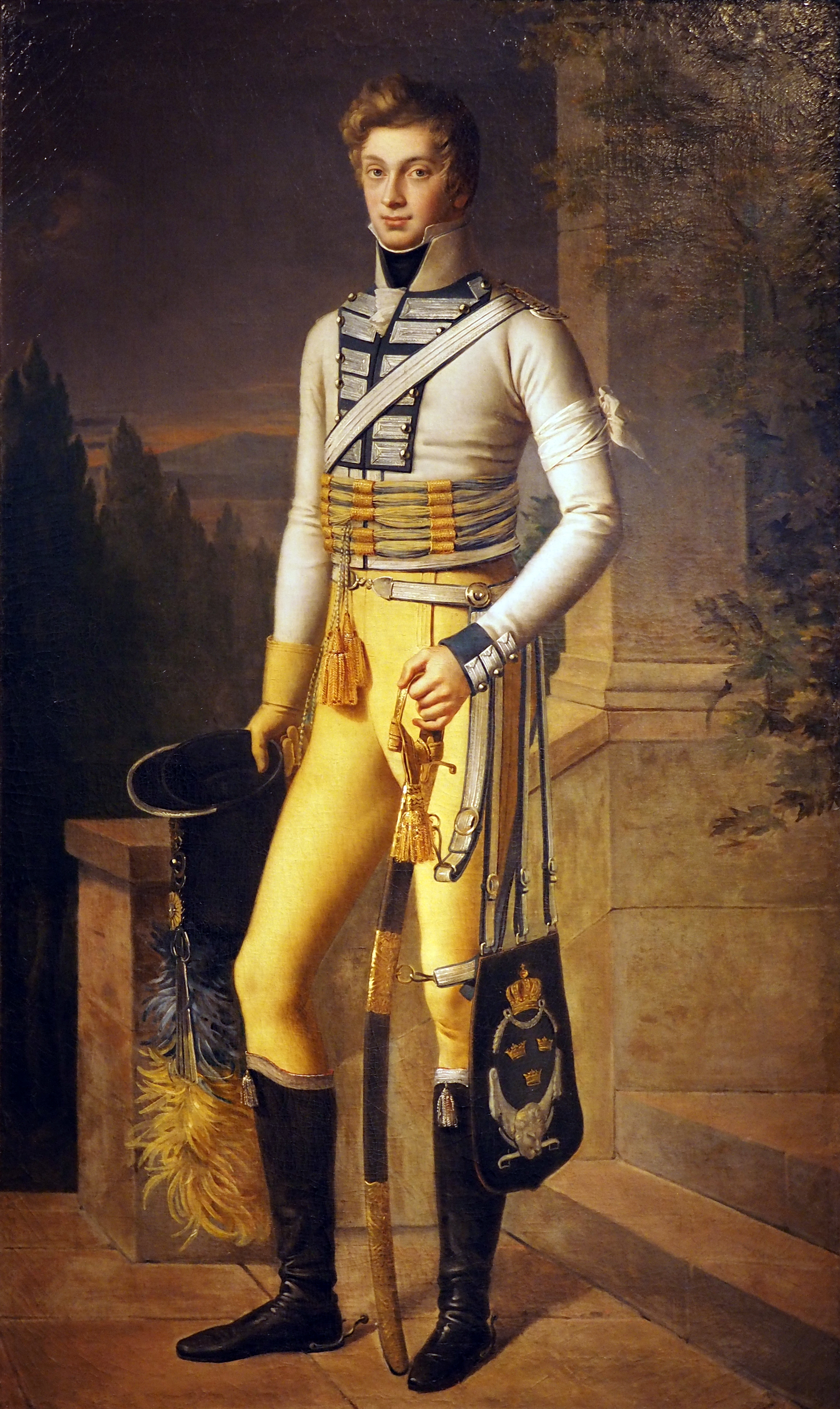
Uniform in 1797

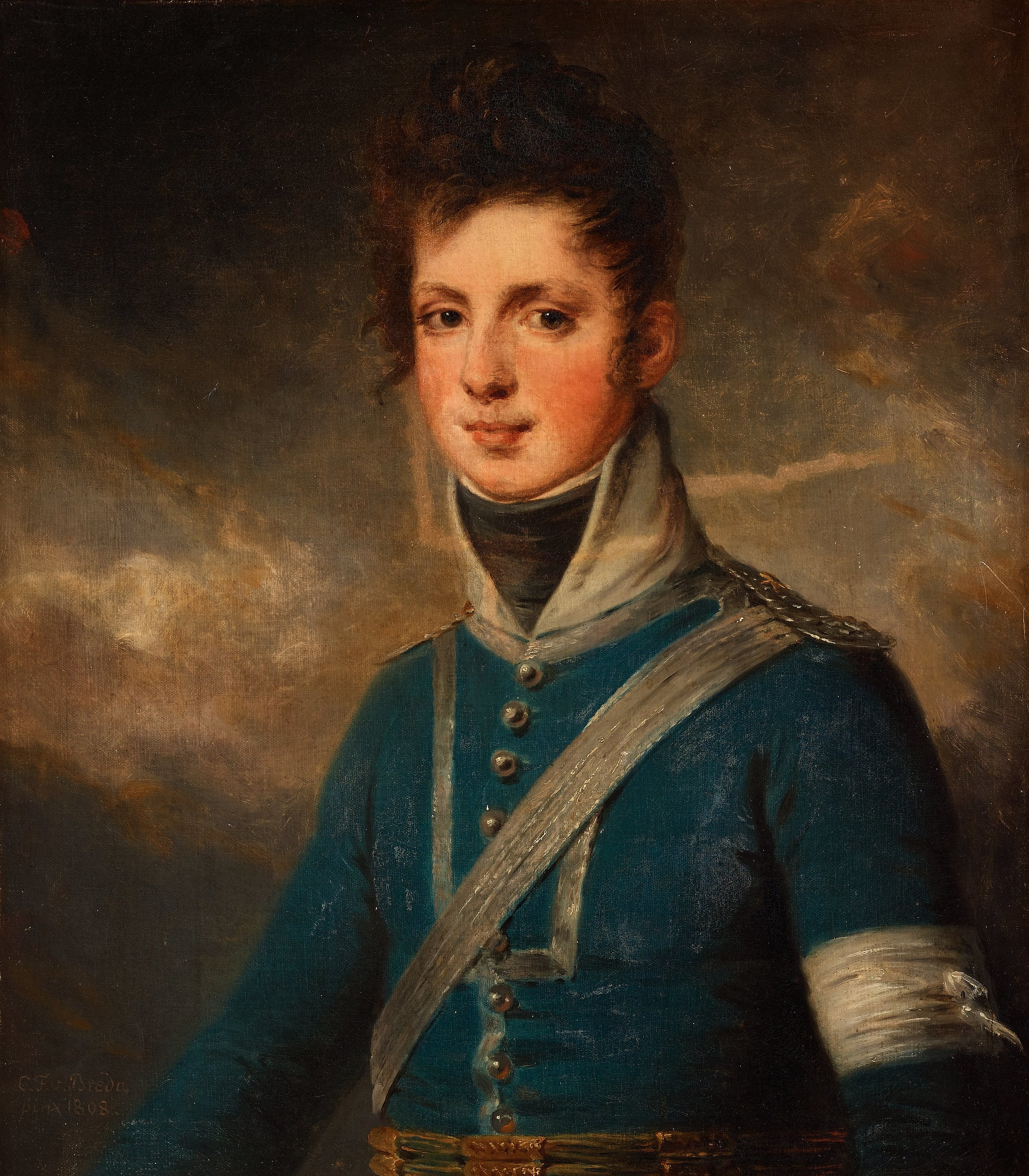
Uniform in 1806

=== Hussar uniforms ===
==== Miscellaneous ====
The highly mobile hussar units soon became popular and Sweden, like many other European countries, increased the number of regiments in the first decade of the 19th century. During the war in Germany 1813 and in Norway 1814 three Swedish hussar regiments participated with some success especially at the battle of Bornhöved in 1813. Only details of the uniforms were changed and in 1796 the officers' dolman was dark blue with a Prussian collar with a yellow edge. There were five rows of buttons, each with 14 gilded bullet buttons. These button rows were joined with double, thick and squared golden strings. On the outer rows, a single string formed a loop. There was gold lacing on arms, tails, back and below the collar. On the left shoulder was a strap of silver. The dolman for troopers was the same as for officers with the following exceptions: The 10 rows of buttons were joined with double, thick and squared yellow strings of wool. On the outer rows loops as above. For fatigues a single-breasted jacket of dark blue broadcloth was used. The pelisse was dark blue with yellow strings, black fur-trimmed lining and edging, both of sheepskin, and the same buttons as for the dolman. The Spanish cloak was dark blue with a yellow cord, tassels and button and the yellow breeches of chamois. As headgear a mirliton cap of black felt with a wing and a yellow streamer (officers had a cord and a tuft in gold, and cockade with a button), yellow cord with tufts (officers in gold/silver) and a white standing plume or a bicorne of black felt with a clasp, pom-pom, plume with tassels for officers. The stock was of black crepon and the black, short hessian boots had a tassel. In 1800 came gaiters of dark blue broadcloth mounted with black calf hide and a strap under the foot (buttoned outside boots, breeches and dolman) and trousers of dark blue broadcloth with a stripe of gold braid (a yellow stripe for troopers) in the outer seam from the upper part of the pocket down to the lowest part of the leg. In 1806 the dolman and the pelisse were changed, giving the collar the regimental colour, making the strings on the dolman and pelisse slimmer and increasing from 10 to 14 the numbers in the five button rows. In 1809 the white brassard for officers (worn since 1772) disappeared. In 1814 a pale blue dolman, gaiters and trousers and white pelisse with strings, buttons and silver lacing (white for troopers) were introduced to the Life Guard of Horse. In 1815 the Life Regiment Hussar Corps got a dark blue dolman and pelisse with strings and silver lacing.

==== Arms and strappings ====
During the period a cartouche of black leather with a strap with braid for officers and of black leather for troopers over the left shoulder and a sabretache m/1835 of black leather (different types) were worn. Sabre m/1793 for troopers of the hussar regiments and sabre m/1800 for officers of the hussar regiments, sabre m/1807 for troopers (cavalry), sword m/1810 for officers (cavalry) sabre m/1814 for all personnel (light cavalry), sword m/1820 for officers (cavalry) and sabre m/1842 for troopers (cavalry). As well as in 1822 a sabre for officers of the hussar regiments except the Life Guards of Horse and the Life Regiment Hussar Corps. In 1822 officers of the Småland Hussar Regiment (Smålands husarregemente) were issued with gold fittings on the cartouche strap and the same year officers of the Crown Prince's Hussar Regiment got a new sabre. The firearms were pistol m/1759, pistol m/1738-1802 for all personnel and pistol m/1807 (smoothbore and rifled with a loose butt) for all personnel. The carbine was to be suspended for hussar units but the carbine m/1759 was still used.

==== Special equipment ====
Life Guards of Horse

The Horse Guard became hussars in 1814 and were equipped with dolmans for officers of pale blue broadcloth with white collar and cuffs. On the breast five rows of buttons each with 14 bullet buttons in silver. These button rows were joined with double four-edged strings in silver. At the outer row, a loop was made with a single string. Lace in silver on sleeves, tails and back and under the collar. On left shoulder a shoulder strap. Dolman for troopers was the same as for officers with the following exceptions: Pale blue, button rows are joined with double four-edged strings of white wool. At the outer row loops as above. The pelisse was of white broadcloth with strings in silver (troopers white), grey lining and fur trimming, both of sheepskin. Buttons were the same as on the dolman. Trousers and gaiters of pale blue broadcloth (medium blue) with a 40-mm stripe in silver (white) at the outer seam. The gaiters were lined with hide. The barrel sash was blue and yellow (officer of silk). In 1820 the dolman was changed by making the collar pale blue and a new mirliton cap of black felt with a yellow wing and a white standing plume was introduced.

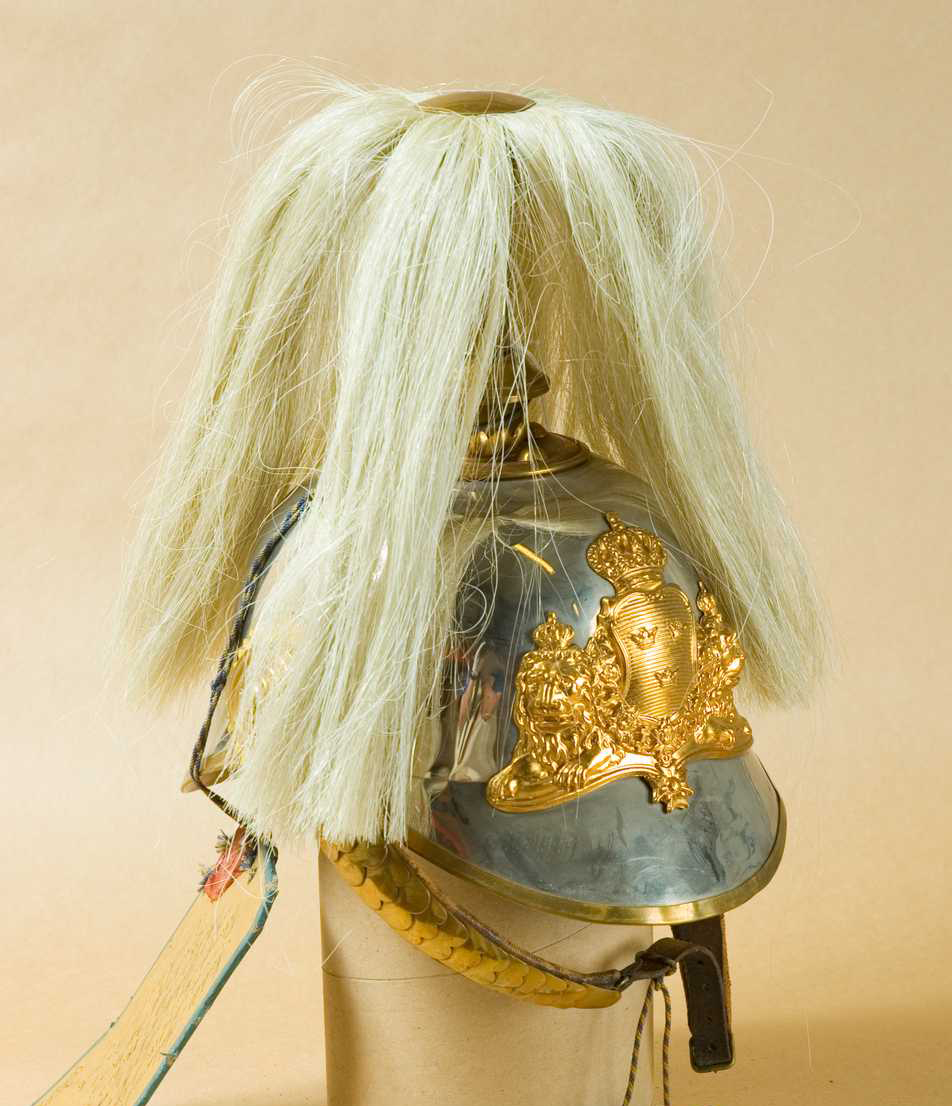
Helmet m/1879 with plume m/1887 of a troopers

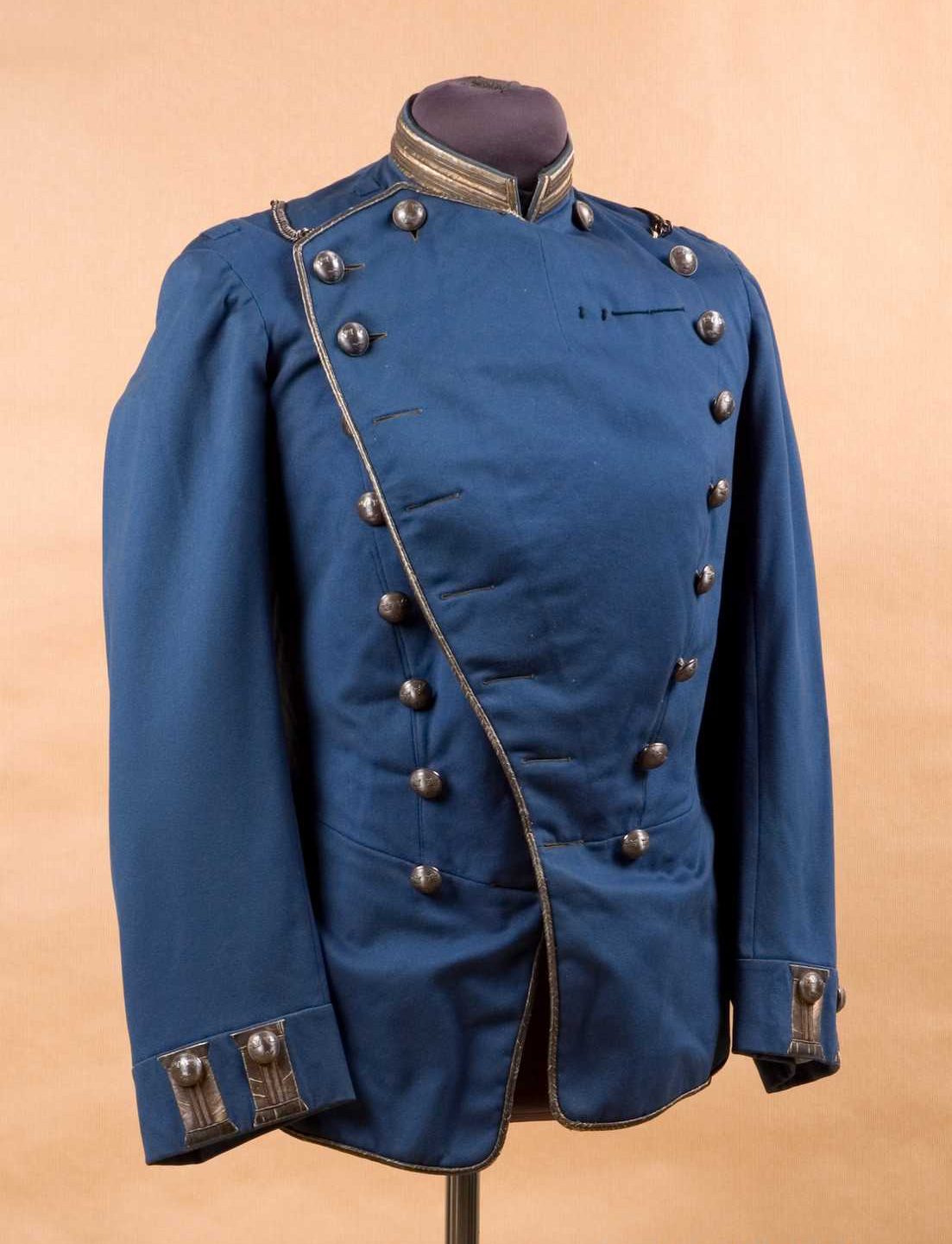
Broadcloth m/1852 of an officer

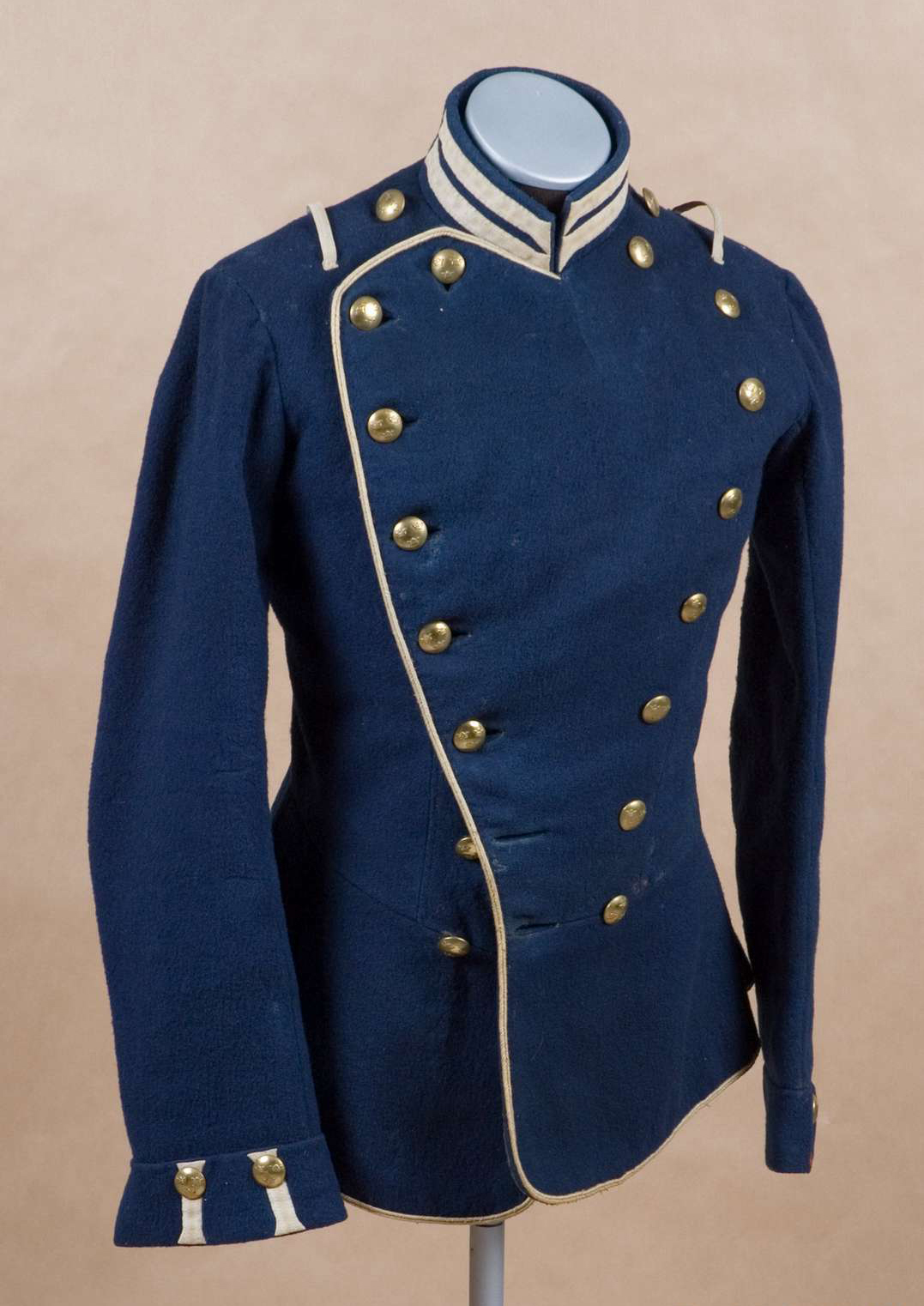
Broadcloth m/1852 of a trooper

Uniform of the regiment

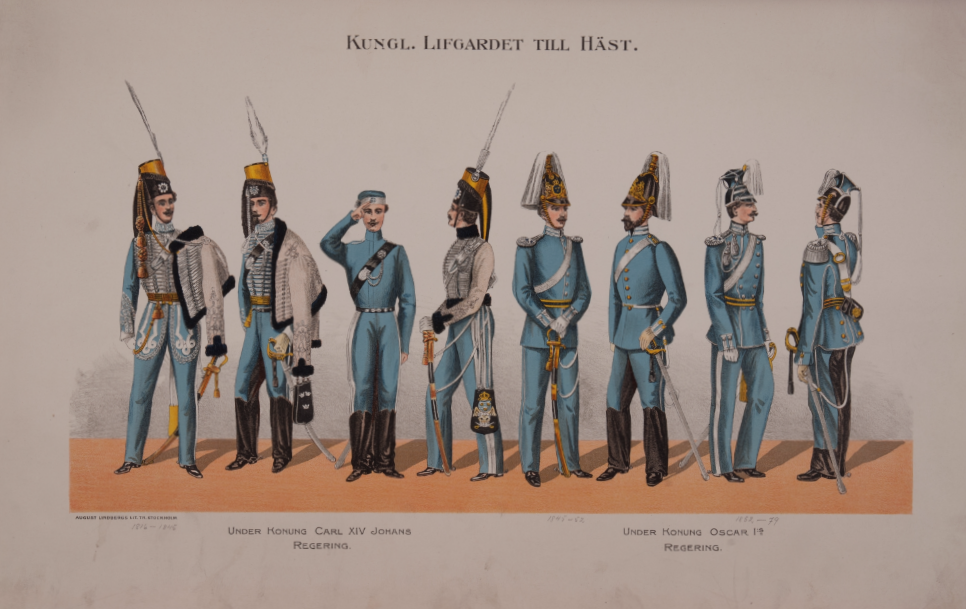
Uniforms of the regiment

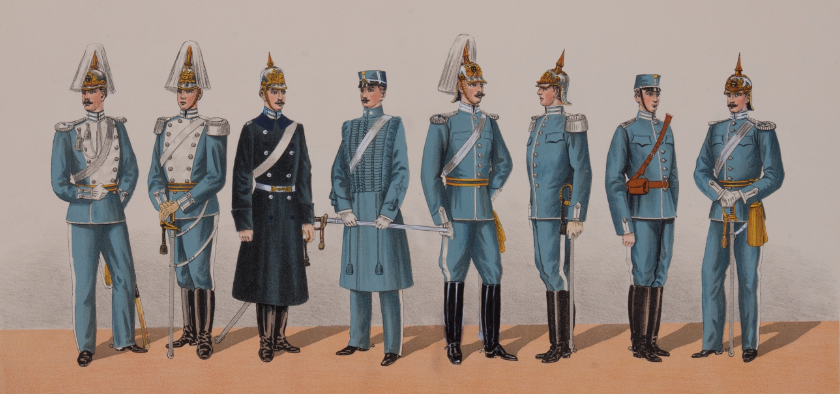
Uniforms of the regiment

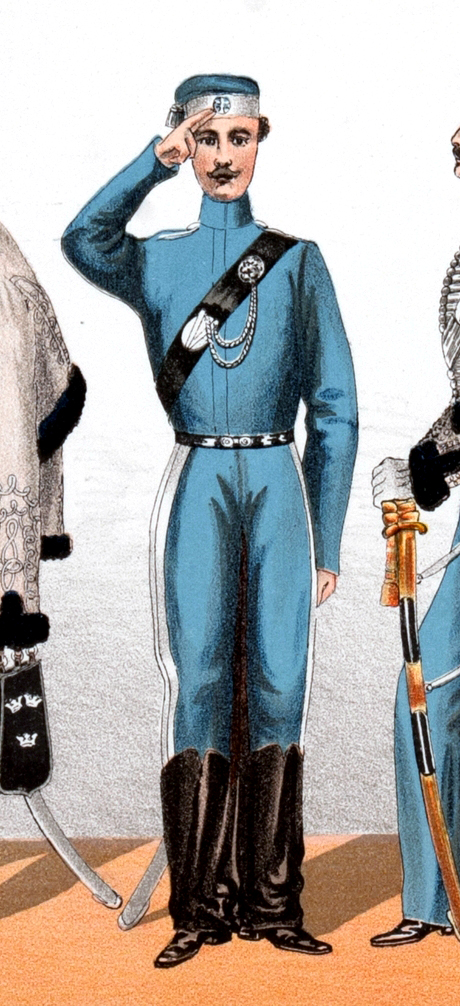
Two-finger salute

== Commanding officers ==
Regimental commanders and executive officers (Sekundchef) from 1770 to 1927. Sekundchef was a title introduced in 1797, when the king took over as regimental commander. The title was used in the regiments that belonged to the King's Life and Household Troops (Kungl. Maj:ts Liv- och Hustrupper).

=== Regimental commanders ===
- 1772–1774: Jacob Magnus Sprengtporten
- 1774–1775: Georg Magnus Sprengtporten
- 1775–1792: Evert Vilhelm Taube
- 1792–1796: Hans Henric von Essen
- 1797–1806: Gustav IV Adolf
- 1806–1818: Charles XIII
- 1818–1844: Charles XIV John
- 1844–1859: Oscar I
- 1859–1872: Charles XV
- 1872–1907: Oscar II
- 1907–1927: Gustaf V

=== Executive officers ===
- 1797–1809: Carl Reinhold Uggla
- 1809–1815: Gustaf Löwenhielm
- 1815–1822: Duke of Södermanland
- 1822–1822: Axel Ehrenreich Gustaf Broberger
- 1822–1844: Magnus Brahe
- 1844–1847: Johan Carl Puke
- 1847–1856: Ludvig Ernst von Stedingk
- 1856–1864: Ulrik Fabian Sandels
- 1864–1872: Carl Magnus Ludvig Björnstjerna
- 1872–1885: Anders Erland Petter von Plomgren
- 1885–1894: Axel August Gustaf von Rosen
- 1894–1898: Duke of Västergötland
- 1898–1905: Christer Hampus Mörner
- 1905–1910: Erik Oxenstierna af Korsholm och Wasa
- 1910–1913: ?
- 1913–1915: Bror Munck
- 1915–1922: Reinhold Gustaf Edvard Moore von Rosen
- 1922–1927: Carl Magnus von Essen

== Names, designations and locations ==
Name	Translation	From		To
Kungl. Finska lätta dragonkåren	Royal Finnish Light Dragoon Corps	1770-02-20	–	1772-09-17
Kungl. Lätta dragonerna av Livgardet	Royal Light Dragoons of the Life Guards	1772-09-18	–	1793-03-24
Kungl. Livhusarregementet	Royal Life Hussar Regiment	1793-03-25	–	1797-04-05
Kungl. Lätta livdragonregementet	Royal Light Life Dragoon Regiment	1797-04-06	–	1806-06-08
Kungl. Livgardet till häst	Royal Life Guard of Horse	1806-06-09	–	1927-12-31
Designation		From		To
No. 1		1816-10-01	–	1914-09-30
K 1		1914-10-01	–	1927-12-31
Location		From		To
Borgå		1770-02-20	–	1777-06-01
Stockholm Garrison		1772-09-18	–	1927-12-31

== See also ==
- List of Swedish cavalry regiments
