= Axel Otto Mörner =

Swedish General

Lieutenant general Count Axel Otto Mörner
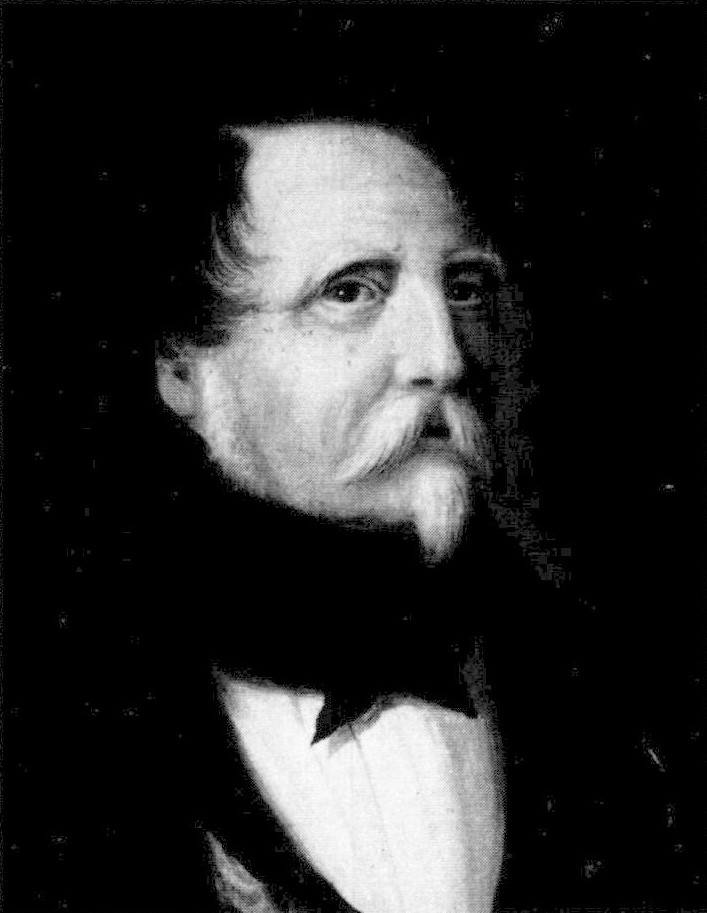
- A self-portrait of Axel Otto Mörner
- Born: Axel Otto Mörner; 8 June 1774; Lekaryd Parish, Småland, Sweden
- Died: 20 October 1852 (aged 78); Eksjö Parish, Småland, Sweden
- Spouse: Ebba Modée (m. 1801)
- Military career
- Allegiance: Sweden
- Branch: Swedish Army
- Service years: 1777–1840
- Rank: Lieutenant general
- Conflicts: Dano-Swedish War (1808–1809); Battle of Toverud
- Awards: Pour le Mérite
- Other work: Minister of War (1840–43)

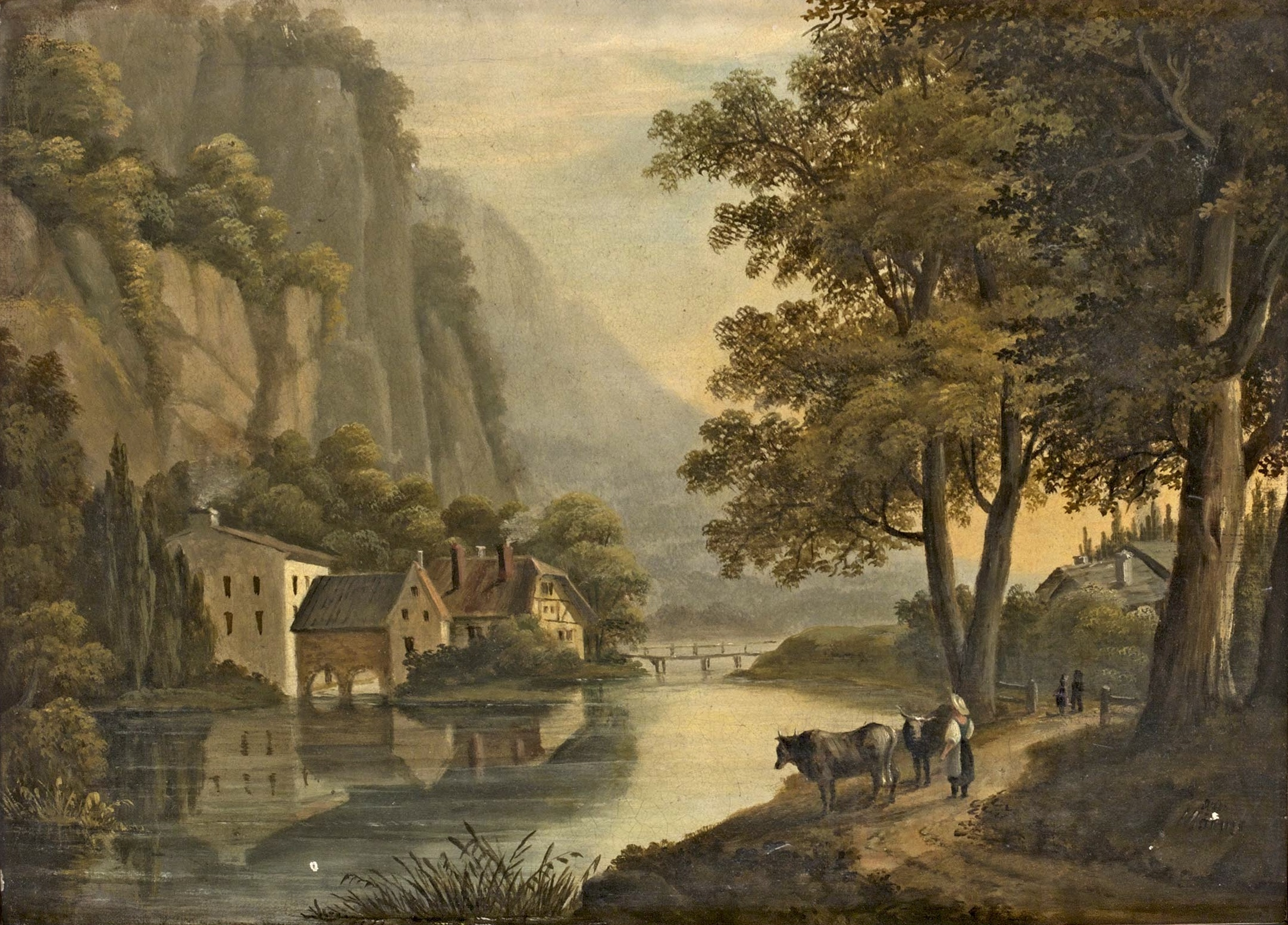
Axel Mörner painting.

Count Axel Otto Mörner (8 June 1774 – 20 October 1852) was a Swedish artist and general.

== Family ==
Mörner was born in Lekaryd Parish in Jönköping County, Sweden and was the son of Lieutenant Colonel Count Carl Gustaf Mörner and Sofia Elisabet Steuch. He was the brother of Hampus Mörner, Charlotta Mörner, Gustaf Fredrik Mörner and Carl Stellan Mörner.

== Personal life ==
On 4 October 1801 he married Ebba Modée at Rosersberg Palace.

Government offices
Preceded by Bror Cederström	Minister of War; 1840–1843	Succeeded by Arfved Lovisin
