= Toverud (disambiguation) =

Toverud is a farm in Norway.

Toverud may also refer to:

- Kirsten Utheim Toverud (1890–1949), Norwegian pediatrician
- Battle of Toverud, railway station in Germany
