= Bror Munck =

Swedish Army officer (1857–1935)

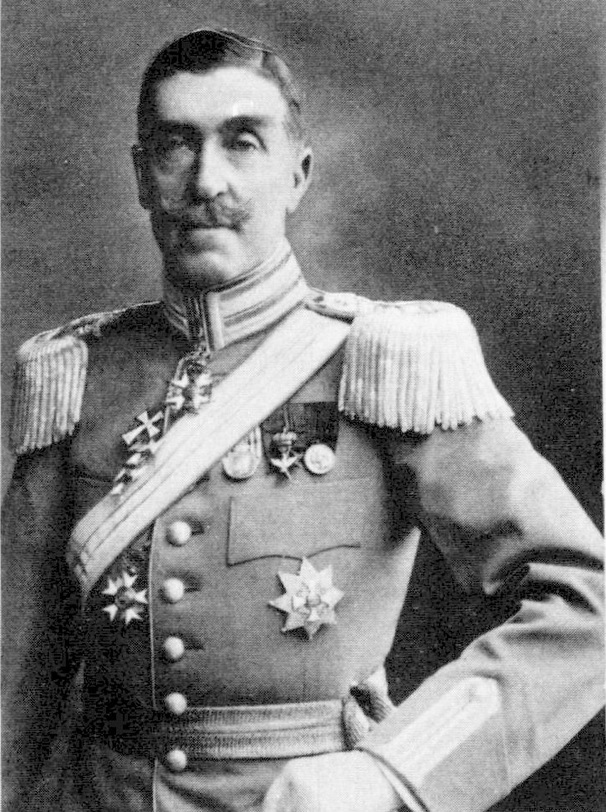
- Bror Munck in 1931.
- Born: Bror Oliver Claes Munck af Fulkila; 21 October 1857; Jönköping, Sweden–Norway
- Died: 18 July 1935 (aged 77); Stockholm, Sweden
- Burial place: Norra begravningsplatsen
- Military career
- Allegiance: Sweden
- Branch: Swedish Army
- Service years: 1877–1922
- Rank: Lieutenant General
- Commands: Cavalry School; Crown Prince's Hussar Regiment; Life Guards of Horse; Inspector of the Cavalry; 3rd Army Division

Lieutenant General Friherre Bror Oliver Claes Munck af Fulkila (21 October 1857 – 18 July 1935) was a Swedish Army officer. Munck served as commanding officer of the Crown Prince's Hussar Regiment, the Life Guards of Horse, as the Inspector of the Cavalry and as commanding officer of the 3rd Army Division. He is also known as the organizer and head of the so-called Munckska kåren, a secret right-wing paramilitary group.

== Early life ==
Munck was born on 21 October 1857 in Jönköping, Sweden, the son of the colonel and the regimental commander of the then Jönköping Regiment Carl Jacob Munck and his wife in the second marriage, baroness Henriette Ulrika Antoinetta Carolina Cederström and thus brother to the princess Ebba Bernadotte. His father's family was probably of Finnish origin and dates back to the 16th century. The mother was the daughter of the "hero from Bornhöft", later the General Friherre Bror Cederström, who for his bravery in the battle in this place became the Knight Grand Cross of the Order of the Sword, the highest military award in Sweden. Munck is named after this grandfather, and he also became a cavalryman. Munck was promoted to vice corporal in Småland Hussar Regiment in 1874 and passed mogenhetsexamen the following year.

== Career ==
Munck graduated from the Military Academy Karlberg, where he in 1877 he was appointed underlöjtnant. As such, he was commissioned as a messenger officer (ordonnansofficer) in the 2nd Army Division (II. arméfördelningen) from 1883 to 1887. In the latter year he was promoted to lieutenant and later served from 1892 to 1895 as the messenger officer of the Inspector of the Cavalry, during which time he served as secretary of the Committee for the Revision of the Exercise Regulations for the Cavalry. Later, he advanced as a ryttmästare in the Swedish Army in 1896 and in the regiment in 1897. He participated in imperial military exercises in Germany in 1901, and served as commanding officer of the Cavalry School (Kavalleriskolan) from 1902 to 1903, and was a member of the Army Delegate (Arméns fullmäktige) in 1902.

He was promoted to major in the Scanian Dragoon Regiment (Skånska dragonregementet) in 1904. Munck served with the 7th German Ulan Regiment and 16th German Dragoon Regiment in 1906. In 1906 he was appointed lieutenant colonel of the Life Regiment Dragoons and two years later he became colonel and commanding officer of the Crown Prince's Hussar Regiment before transferring in 1913 to the Life Guards of Horse where he served as executive officer for two years. Munck was promoted to major general in 1915 and served as Inspector of the Cavalry from 1915 to 1917, and then as commanding officer of the 3rd Army Division (III. arméfördelningen) from 1917 to 1922 when he retired and was promoted to lieutenant general.

Munck was a leading expert in cavalry and equestrian sports, and represented the Swedish Army on several occasions abroad. He was also known as the organizer and head of the so-called Munckska kåren, a secret right-wing paramilitary group. Munck was also chairman of the executive board of the King's Hospital (Konungens hospital), a member of numerous committees for investigations of military issues, attended by the King of Italy in 1913, and the State Regent of Finland Carl Gustaf Emil Mannerheim in 1919. He was also the Swedish Army's representative to the funeral of Emperor Franz Joseph I of Austria in 1916 and at a ceremony in Fredrikshald on King Charles XII's day of death, as well as the Swedish Army officer's representative at the horse races at 1924 Summer Olympics.

== Personal life ==
On 20 October 1886 in Stockholm, Munck married Baroness Ebba Elisabet De Geer af Leufsta (born 15 December 1863 in Frötuna), the daughter of Marshal of the Court, Friherre Louis De Geer af Leufsta, and his first wife Vendla Mariana Johanna Sofia von Wright.

== Death ==
Munck died on 16 February 1935 in Oscar Parish, Stockholm. He was buried in Norra begravningsplatsen in Stockholm on 23 February 1935.

== Dates of rank ==
- 1874 – Vice korpral
- 1877 – Underlöjtnant
- 1887 – Andre löjtnant
- 1888 – Förste löjtnant
- 1896 – Ryttmästare
- 1904 – Major
- 1906 – Lieutenant colonel
- 1908 – Colonel
- 1915 – Major general
- 1922 – Lieutenant general

== Awards and decorations ==
- Knight Second Class of the Order of the Red Eagle (1908)
- Commander Second Class of the Order of the Dannebrog (3 May 1909)
- Commander Second Class of the Order of the Sword (6 June 1911)
- Grand Officer of the Order of the Crown of Italy (July 1913)
- Commander First Class of the Order of the Sword (6 June 1915)
- Grand Cross of the Order of the White Rose of Finland (1919)
- Commander First Class of the Order of St. Olav (February 1919)
- Commander Grand Cross of the Order of the Sword (6 June 1923)
- Grand Cross of the Order of the Black Star (18 July 1927)
- Grand Cross of the Ordre du Nichan El-Anouar
- Commander of the Order of the Crown
- Knight First Class of the Order of the White Falcon

== Honours ==
- Member of the Royal Swedish Academy of War Sciences (1902)

Military offices
Preceded by Gustaf Nyblæus	Inspector of the Cavalry; 1915–1917	Succeeded by Thorsten Rudenschöld
Preceded by Christofer von Platen	3rd Army Division; 1917–1922	Succeeded by Axel Carleson
Professional and academic associations
Preceded by Henning von Krusenstierna	President of the Royal Swedish Academy of War Sciences; 1929–1931	Succeeded by Carl Gustaf Hammarskjöld
