= Björnstorp Castle =

Manor building in Lund Municipality, Scania, Sweden

- Björnstorp slott
- Lund Municipality
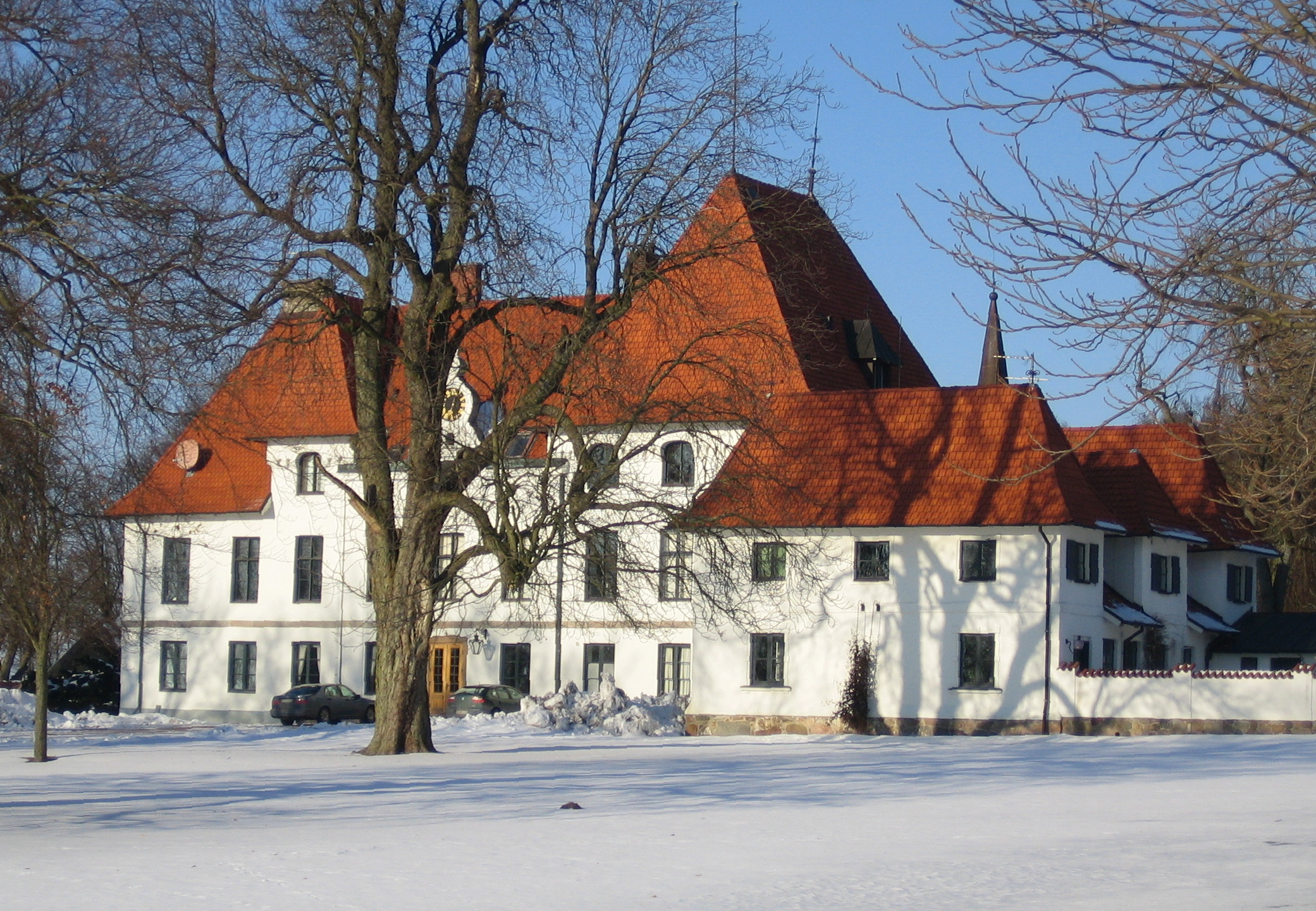
- Björnstorp Castle

Site information
- Type: Castle
- Open to the public: No

Location
- Scania Sweden
- Location within Skåne
- Coordinates: 55.6280°N 13.4066°E

Site history
- Built: 1752

Björnstorp Castle (Swedish: Björnstorp slott) is a manor building in Lund Municipality, Scania, Sweden. It was built in 1752 and reshaped in 1860–1880, with its final appearance set in 1868, by architect Helgo Zettervall (1831–1907).

== History ==
Björnstorp is mentioned in 1568, when it was granted to Mikkel Pedersen Gönge from the crown. After this, it was owned by various members of the local Danish nobility. In 1725, the estate was acquired by the Swedish countess Christina Piper (1673–1752). At that time only a smaller property, she enlarged it into a manor estate: the present manor building is from 1752. In 1754, the daughter of Christina Piper, Hedvig Maria Sture, sold it to baron Fredrik Gustav Gyllenkrok of Svenstorp, and it has since then been owned by the Gyllenkrok family. Between 1780 and 1799, it was the home of the artist Charlotta Cederström (1760–1832) married to Baron Axel Ture Gyllenkrok. Björnstorp was redecorated to its present exterior by Helgo Zettervall in 1868.

== Other sources ==
- (in Swedish) Björnstorp Castle, from Sylve Åkesson's website on Scanian Castles and Mansion
