= Battle of Toverud =

1808 battles between Sweden and Denmark-Norway

Battles of Rakkestad and Toverud
- Part of the Dano-Swedish War of 1808–1809
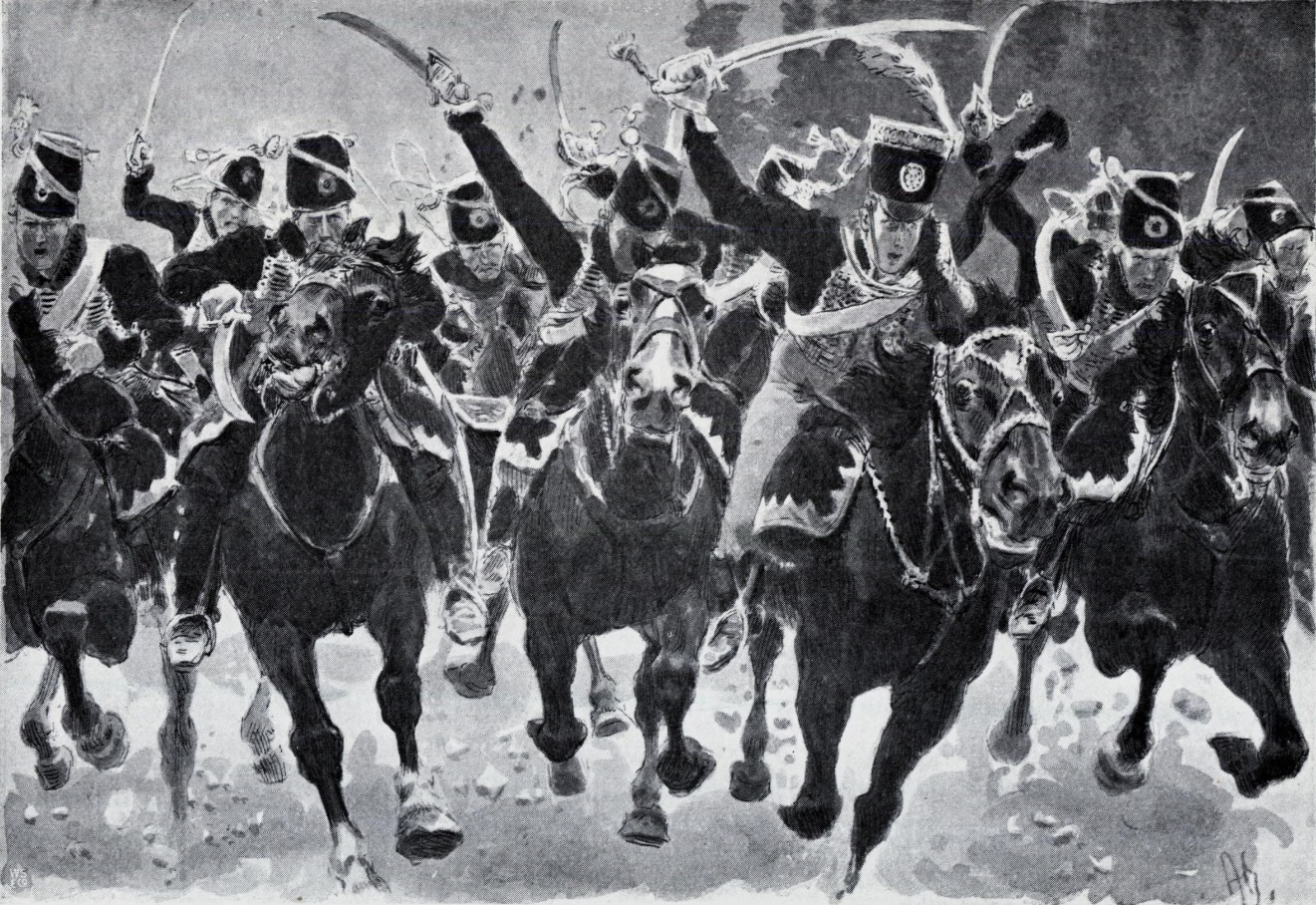
- Charge of the Swedish hussars at Rakkestad, by Andreas Bloch
Date	19–20 April 1808
Location	Rakkestad, Østfold; Toverud, Aurskog, Norway
Result	Rakkestad: Swedish victory Toverud: Dano-Norwegian victory

Belligerents
Sweden	Denmark–Norway

Commanders and leaders
Gustaf Olof Lagerbring; Axel Otto Mörner (surrendered); Axel Gabriel Oxenstierna	(Denmark–Norway) Christian August (Denmark–Norway) Paul Weibye (Denmark–Norway) Ole Fredrik Heyerdahl

Strength
750	2,400

Casualties and losses
Rakkestad: 11; Toverud: 2 killed 13 wounded 101–121 captured	Rakkestad: 10–20; Toverud: 30–40

The Battle of Toverud or the Battles of Rakkestad and Toverud were several skirmishes fought around Toverud in Aurskog and Rakkestad in Østfold, on 19 and 20 April 1808, as a part of the Dano-Swedish War of 1808-1809. Christian August sent a larger force to cut off and destroy the scattered Swedish detachments under Gustaf Olof Lagerbring. A small Swedish force, led by Oxenstierna, managed to break through the Norwegian lines, led by Heyerdahl, at Rakkestad. Another contingent, under Axel Otto Mörner, failed to break through the lines at Toverud, under Weibye, resulting in the capture of the Swedish force—except for 13 men who managed to escape to the main army at Haneborg.

== Background ==
On April 14, 1808 the Swedish 2nd Brigade under Colonel Schwerin had crossed the Swedish-Norwegian border at Skillingfors and marched westwards towards Aurskog and Høland. Major Friederich Christopher von Ditten, who was commander of the small Norwegian outposts stationed in the area, chose to pull his forces back across the river Glomma instead of attacking the Swedes. This meant that the road was open for Count Axel Otto Mörner's cavalry unit, who then occupied the undefended Blaker entrenchment on 16 April.

Prince Christian August had been informed about the Swedish attack and ordered six companies and some dragoons, a total of 2,200 men, to march northwards from Råde, and on the evening of 18 April the prince and his forces spent the night at Trøgstad Church. It was during his stay there that he was told that the Swedes had captured the Blaker entrenchment. At dawn on 19 April he continued the quick march northwards towards Aurskog.

On the same day, Colonel Schwerin also sent a company northwards towards Blaker to reinforce Count Mörner, but at Killingmo they encountered one of the Norwegian vanguards and chose to retreat back to Colonel Schwerin's headquarters at Haneborg. Prince Christian August had thereby managed to cut off Count Mörner and his troops from the Swedish 2nd Brigade, and by ordering two of his companies to entrench themselves on the farms in Rakkestad, the Prince intended to block Count Mörner's ability to retreat.

== Battle ==
Major Paul Weibye had from Prince Christian August's plan advanced in the direction of Blaker with five companies and 40 dragoons to find a suitable place to stop the enemy, and chose to occupy Toverud farm in the afternoon on 19 April. Major Weibye lined up his soldiers with the front to the south, where the 250 Swedish soldiers under Count Mörner was stationed, while the light company was positioned further north towards Haneborg.

Count Mörner quickly realized that the Norwegian forces were about to encircle his troops and decided to quickly withdraw back to the main force at Haneborg. In all haste the Swedes began advancing towards the Norwegian positions around Rakkestad, but all the snow made it difficult for the Swedish forces to bypass parts of the Norwegian troops. This gave them no option, but to attack. Mörner chose to start the attack with a cavalry charge and sent the Hussars first. Since the Norwegian soldiers fired their muskets too early this gave the Swedes a great advantage since the Norwegians did not have time to reload, and the defense broke down when the Hussars reached the Norwegian lines.

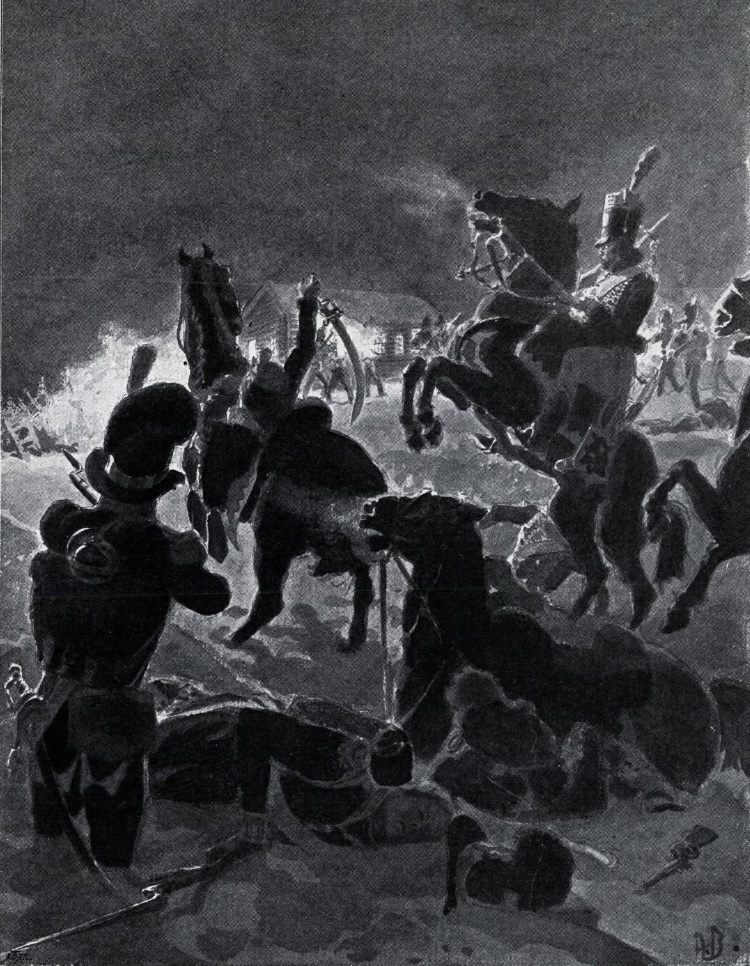
Battle of Toverud, by Andreas Bloch

The Swedes had thus come through parts of the Norwegian defenses at Rakkestad, but soon realized that they also had to break through the troops who had entrenched themselves at Toverud. Count Mörner decided that the Hussars again would be first in line and storm the Norwegian position at Toverud with Mörner and infantry behind. But this time the Hussars was driven back, and Mörner decided instead to make a bayonet charge. But before the Swedish troops had managed to reorganize themselves in order to make a new attack, the Norwegian forces had started to attack them in the flanks. Count Mörner then realized that they could not break through the Norwegian defense at Toverud, and he surrendered to the Norwegian Lieutenant Gregers Lund.

== Aftermath ==
112 Swedish Grenadiers and Hussars, and 9 officers had been taken prisoner after the battle, of which around 40 were wounded. These prisoners were later paraded through Christiania and then brought to Akershus Fortress. Count Axel Otto Mörner was placed as a prisoner on Ulefoss Manor at Niels Aall, and later released in 1809.

== Legacy ==
In connection with the 100-year anniversary in 1908, it was erected a monument(Norwegian: Toverudstøtta) in memory of the battle.

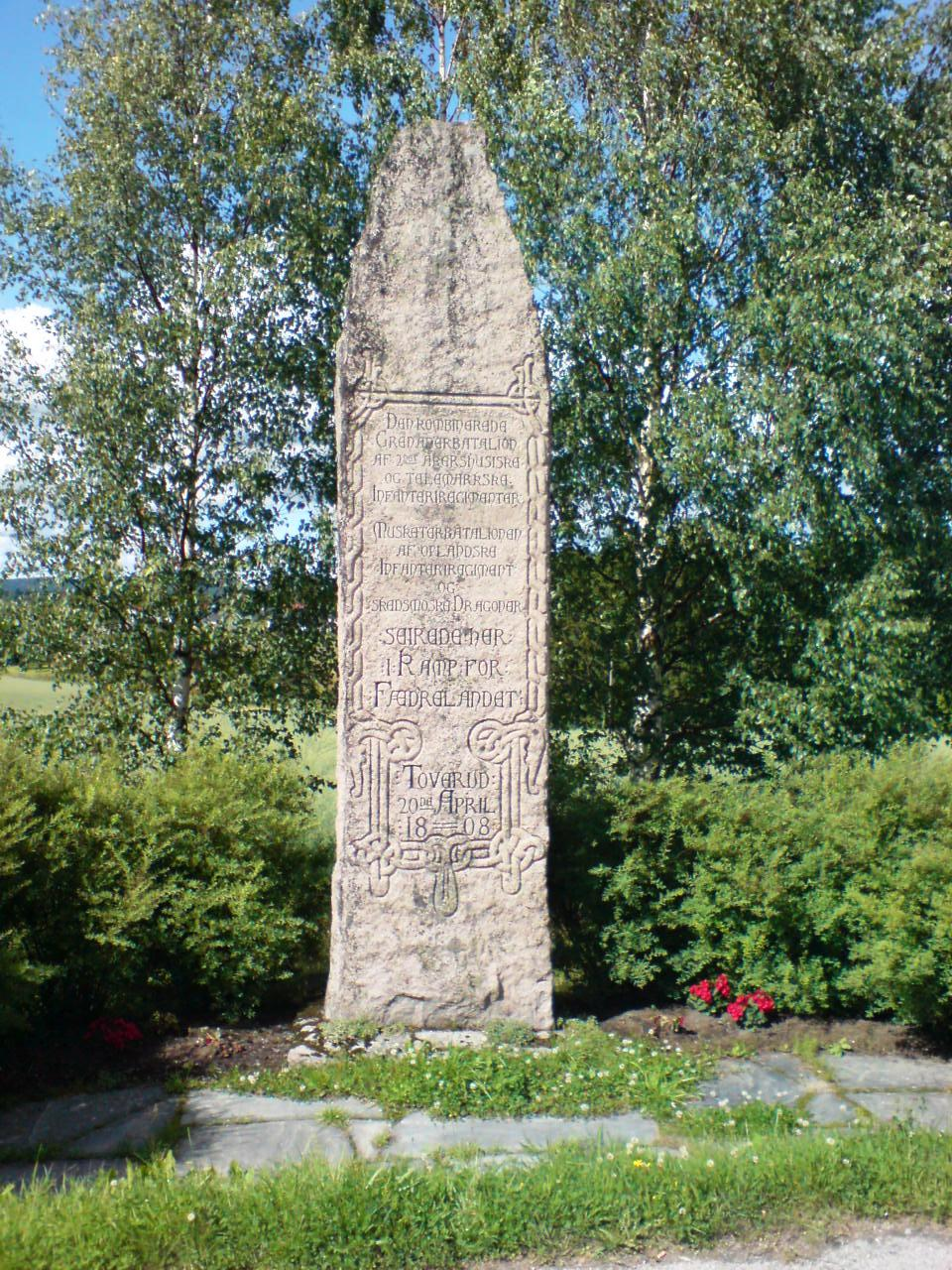
Toverud monument (Toverudstøtta)

== Bibliography ==
- Angell, Henrik (1914). Syv-aars-krigen for 17. mai 1807-1814. Kristiania: Aschehoug. ISBN 82-90520-23-9.
- Olsen, Per Erik (2011). Norges kriger. Oslo: Vega Forlag AS. ISBN 978-82-8211-107-2.
- Generalstaben (1915). Sveriges krig åren 1808 och 1809, Volume 6 (in Swedish). Stockholm: Kongl. boktryckeriet P. A. Norstedt & söner.
- Meijer, Carl Fredrik (1867). Kriget emellan Sverige och Danmark, åren 1808 och 1809 (in Swedish). Stockholm: Oscar L. Lamms Förlag.
