= Axel Gustaf Gyllenkrok =

Axel Gustaf Gyllenkrok (July 14, 1783, in Gödelöv parish, Malmöhus County, southern Sweden – May 18, 1865, in Lund) was a baron, zoology collector and philanthropist.

He was the great-grandson (paternal) of military general Axel Gyllenkrok (1665–1730) and the son of Charlotta Cederström.

In 1830 he was elected member of the Swedish Academy of Science. He donated his zoological collections to Lund University in 1845. He also founded several institutions for children. He was considered a benefactor of science and was a generous philanthropist in his home region.
