= Västergötland Cavalry Regiment =

- Västgöta kavalleriregemente
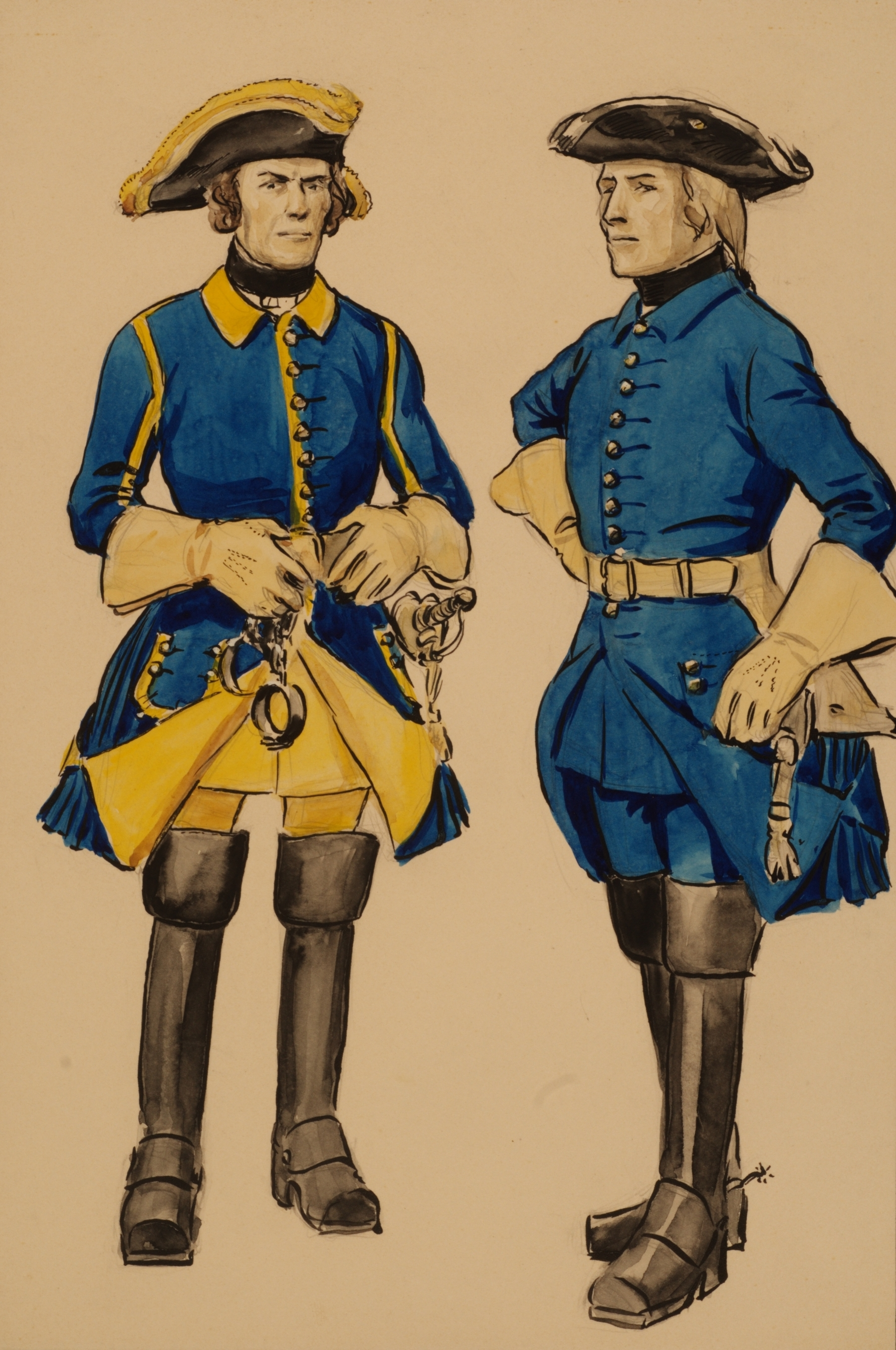
- An officer and trooper of the regiment during the Great Northern War
- Active: 1628–1811
- Country: Sweden
- Branch: Swedish Army
- Type: Cavalry
- Size: Regiment
- Colours: Yellow and black
- Battle honours: Skara (1611), Skillingehed (1612), Burgstall (1631), Breitenfeld (1631), Dirschau (1627), Stuhm (1629), Lützen (1632), Lund (1676)

The Västergötland Cavalry Regiment (Swedish: Västgöta kavalleriregemente) was a cavalry regiment of the Swedish Army raised in 1628. It was reorganized into an infantry regiment in 1811. The regiment's soldiers were recruited from the province of Västergötland.

== History ==
The regiment has its origins in fänikor (companies) raised in Västergötland in the 16th century. In 1613, these units—along with fänikor from the nearby province of Dalsland—were organised by Gustav II Adolf into Västergötlands storregemente. Sometime between 1621 and 1624, the grand regiment was permanently split into four smaller regiments, of which Västergötland Horse Regiment was one.

The regiment was officially raised in 1628 although it had existed since the early 1620s. The regiment soon changed name to Västergötland and Dalsland Horsemen and was one of the original 8 Swedish cavalry regiments mentioned in the 1634 Instrument of Government. The regiment's first commander was Erik Soop. It was renamed to Västergötland Cavalry Regiment in 1655 and was allotted in 1691.

Västergötland Cavalry Regiment was reorganised into a dragoon regiment in 1792 and changed its name to Västergötland Line Dragoon Regiment and later Västergötland Dragoon Regiment to reflect that. The regiment was then reformed into the infantry regiment Västgöta Regiment in 1811.

== Campaigns ==
- ?

== Organisation ==
1634(?)

- Livkompaniet
- Överstelöjtnantens kompani
- Majorens kompani
- Södra Vassbo kompani
- Älvsborgs kompani
- Gudhems kompani
- Barne Härads kompani
- Vartofta kompani

== Name, designation and garrison ==
Name	Translation	From		To
Västgöta regemente till häst	Västergötland Horse Regiment	1628	–	1634
Västgöta och Dals ryttare	Västergötland and Dalsland Horsemen	1634	–	1655
Västgöta kavalleriregemente	Västergötland Cavalry Regiment	1655	–	1802
Västgöta linjedragonregemente	Västergötland Line Dragoon Regiment	1802	–	1806
Västgöta dragonregemente	Västergötland Cavalry Regiment	1806	–	1811

Designation	From		To
No designation		–	

Training ground or garrison town	From		To
Eggeby ängar	1689	–	1745-08-25
Axevalla hed	1745-08-26	–	1811

== See also ==
- List of Swedish regiments
- Provinces of Sweden
