= Bender Dragoon Regiment =

Historical military unit

Bender Dragoon Regiment (Benderska Dragonregementet) was a Swedish Dragoon regiment, raised from Swedish soldiers in Bender, Moldova, then in the Ottoman Empire. The regiment contained two squadrons, each of four troops. The regiment was commanded by Colonel Anders Koskull. After leaving the Ottoman Empire, the regiment participated in the defence of Swedish Pomerania and Stralsund. The survivors were in 1716 transferred to the German Dragoon Regiment.

== Literature ==
- Christian Braunstein, Svenska arméns uniformer, Stockholm 2013.
- Lars-Eric Högberg, Stora Nordiska Kriget 1700-1712, Karlstad 2000.
- Carl Otto Nordensvan, Svenska arméns regementen 1700-1718, Lund 1920.
