= Crown Prince's Hussar Regiment =

- Kronprinsens husarregemente
- Active: 1757–1927
- Country: Sweden
- Branch: Swedish Army
- Type: cavalry regiment
- Nickname: K 7
- Motto: none
- Colors: Dark blue
- Engagements: Stralsund 1807; Bornhöft 1813

The Crown Prince's Hussar Regiment (Swedish: Kronprinsens husarregemente), designated K 7, was a Swedish Army cavalry regiment located in the province of Scania that traced its origins back to the 18th century. It had a number of names over its history, most famously Mörner's Hussar Regiment (Mörnerska husarregementet) during the Napoleonic Wars. It was disbanded in 1927.

== History ==
The regiment has its origin in a hussar corps raised in 1757. The following year, the corps was organized into Svenska husarregementet with Georg Gustaf Wrangel as commander. The regiment was split in two in 1762 forming Blå and Gula husarregementet (the Blue and Yellow regiments). These two were merged back to one in 1766 with the name Husarregementet.

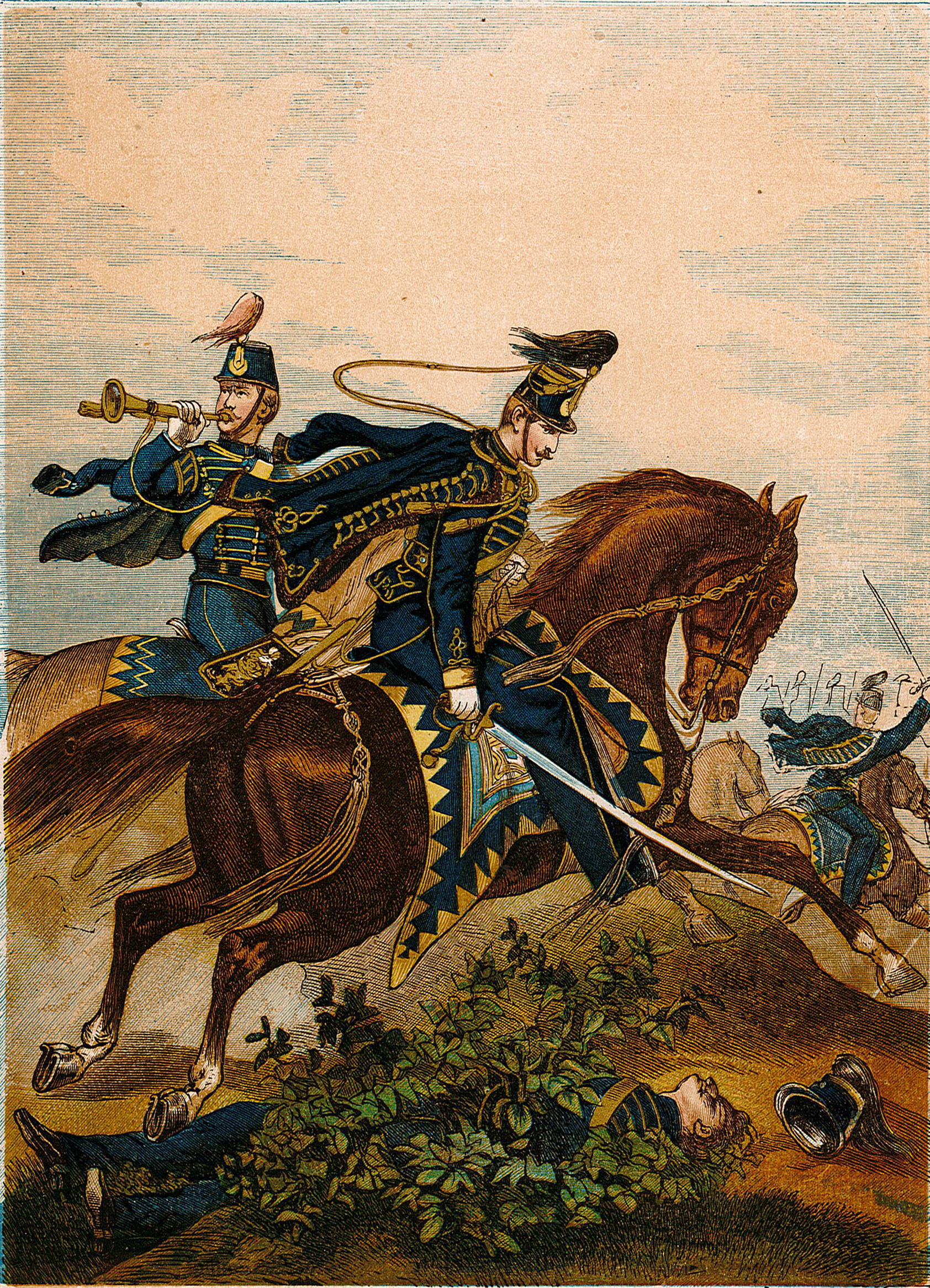
Hussars of Husarregimentete Konung Karl XV as depicted in 1866

The regiment changed name quite a few times during the years, being renamed Mörnerska husarregementet in 1801, Cederströmska husarregementet in 1816 and in 1822, when Crown Prince Oscar (the later King Oscar I) became colonel in the regiment, it was renamed Kronprinsens husarregemente. For some months in 1859 and 1860 it was named Konungens värvade husarregemente before being renamed to Husarregimente Konung Karl XV. And finally, as the crown prince Gustaf VI Adolf was born in 1882 the regiment was renamed back to Kronprinsens husarregemente.

Kronprinsens husarregemente was given the designation K 7 (7th Cavalry Regiment) after a general order in 1816. It was a very special regiment because of two things. Firstly, it was the only unit in the Swedish Army without the prefix "Royal" (Kungliga), as it was the Crown Prince's, secondly, it was the largest (ten squadrons) cavalry regiment garrisoned in one town, in the world. It was disbanded in 1927 with personnel being transferred to Norrland Dragoon Regiment and the newly created Scanian Cavalry Regiment, which also contained personnel from the Scanian Dragoon Regiment and the Scanian Hussar Regiment, also disbanded in 1927.

== Campaigns ==
- The Second War against Napoleon 1813–1814

== Commanding officers ==
Regimental commander from 1758 to 1927. From 1761 to 1766, the regiment was divided into two regiments.

- 1757–1758: F.U. von Putbus P.J.B. von Platen
- 1758–1759: Georg Gustaf Wrangel af Adinal
- 1759–1761: J. Sparre
- 1761–1764: Fredrik Ulrik von Putbus (Blue (Putbus) Hussar Regiment)
- 1764–1766: H.S. Mörner (Blue (Putbus) Hussar Regiment)
- 1761–1763: Georg Gustaf Wrangel af Adinal (Yellow (Wrangel) Hussar Regiment)
- 1763–1764: Lars Åkerhielm (Yellow (Wrangel) Hussar Regiment)
- 1764–1766: M.C. Lewenhaupt (Yellow (Wrangel) Hussar Regiment)
- 1766–1797: H.S. Mörner
- 1797–1801: S.H. Horn
- 1801–1816: Hampus Mörner
- 1816–1822: Bror Cederström
- 1822–1830: G.B.M. Stackelberg
- 1830–1849: Achates Carl von Platen
- 1849–1858: F.A. Sjöcrona
- 1858–1864: C.M.L. Björnstjerna
- 1864–1874: C.A.B. Cederström
- 1874–1883: G.F.A. Boy
- 1883–1891: Aron Siöcrona
- 1891–1893: R.W.T. Berg
- 1893–1902: G.A. von Platen
- 1902–1910: Christofer von Platen
- 1910–1913: Bror Munck
- 1913–1920: Bror Cederström
- 1920–1920: Edward af Sandeberg
- 1920–1927: Axel Braunerhjelm

== Various ==
Names
Svenska husarregementet	Swedish Hussar Regiment	1758-04-24	–	1762
Blå (Putbusska) husarregementet & Gula (Wrangelska) husarregementet	Blue (Putbus) Hussar Regiment & Yellow (Wrangel) Hussar Regiment	1762	–	1766-10-07
Husarregementet	Hussar Regiment	1766-10-08	–	1801-07-12
Mörnerska husarregementet	Mörnerian Hussar Regiment	1801-07-13	–	1816-01-08
Cederströmska Husarregementet	Cederströmian Hussar Regiment	1816-01-09	–	1822-02-04
Kronprinsens husarregemente	Crown Prince's Hussar Regiment	1822-02-05	–	1859-08-10
Konungens värvade husarregemente	King's Enlisted Hussar Regiment	1859-08-11	–	1860-06-17
Husarregementet Konung Karl XV	Hussar Regiment King Charles XV	1860-06-18	–	1882-11-24
Kronprinsens husarregemente	Crown Prince's Hussar Regiment	1882-11-25	–	1927-12-31

Designations
K 7	1816	–	1927-12-31

Training grounds and garrison towns
Bonarps hed	1772	–	1875
Helsingborg (G)	1875	–	1897-09-30
Malmö (G)	1897-10-01	–	1927-12-31

== See also ==
- List of Swedish regiments
