= Ebba Modée =

Swedish noblewoman

Ebba Wilhelmina Modée (October 4, 1775, Karlskrona, Blekinge County, Kingdom of Sweden – March 23, 1840, Eksjö, Jönköping County), was a Swedish noblewoman and courtier, a love interest and potential wife of King Gustav IV Adolf of Sweden.

She was the daughter of Admiral Carl Wilhelm Modée (1735–1798), governor of Stockholm and Ebba Ulrika Sparre af Söfdeborg (1739–1815), who was the daughter of Admiral Count Erik Arvid Sparre af Söfdeborg (1707–1775). Modée was a maid of honor to Duchess Hedvig Elisabeth Charlotte (born a princess of Holstein-Gottorp), wife of the future Charles XIII, between 1794 and 1801, and accompanied her on her trip to Germany and Austria in 1798–1799.

In 1795, despite his recent engagement to Duchess Louise Charlotte of Mecklenburg-Schwerin, Gustav IV Adolf fell in love with Modée. He promised her to call off his engagement, abdicate, and elope with Modée to Bohemia. He already had a document of abdication written when he became attracted to another courtier, Countess Hedda Piper. Several courtly and political factions worked to prevent the King's marriage to a Swedish woman in favour of a marital alliance with a foreign power. Modée herself declined his proposal, and encouraged him to go to Russia in 1796 to be betrothed to Grand Duchess Alexandra Pavlovna. Although the Russian alliance failed, the following year, the king married Frederica of Baden.

In 1801, Modée married a fellow courtier, General Lieutenant Count Axel Otto Mörner af Morlanda (1774–1852), with whom she had been in love for a long time. They had four children. As they were both poor, Duchess Hedwig Elizabeth Charlotte provided them with a place to live. She was also appointed a statsfru.
