= Life Regiment Brigade Cuirassier Corp =

Swedish military unit

Life Regiment Brigade Cuirassier Corps
- Lifregementsbrigadens Kyrassiärcorps
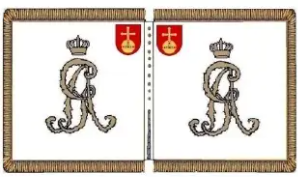
- Regimental Flag
- Active: 1791-1815
- Country: Sweden
- Allegiance: Swedish Armed Forces
- Branch: Swedish Army
- Type: Cavalry
- Garrison/HQ: Utnäslot

The Life Regiment Brigade Cuirassier Corps (Swedish: Lifregementsbrigadens kyrassiärkår) was a heavy elite cavalry unit in the Royal Swedish Army Regiment.

== History ==
Following the Russo-Swedish War, the Swedish High Command introduced structural reforms to reduce costs by cutting down the number of cavalry regiments. In 1791, three indelta cavalry regiments were wholly or partially converted into infantry. Among these, the senior Lifregementet til häst had its twelve squadrons split, and by 1805, these units were permanently established as a hussar corps, an infantry regiment under the Livregementsbrigaden, and the Life Regiment Brigade Cuirassier Corps. In 1815 the corps became independent and changed its name to the Life Regiment Dragoon Corps, which in turn was changed to the Life Regiment Dragoons in 1892.

== Organization ==
In 1805, the unit had 4 companies and 500 men. As of 1809, the unit had 257 men.

== Uniform ==
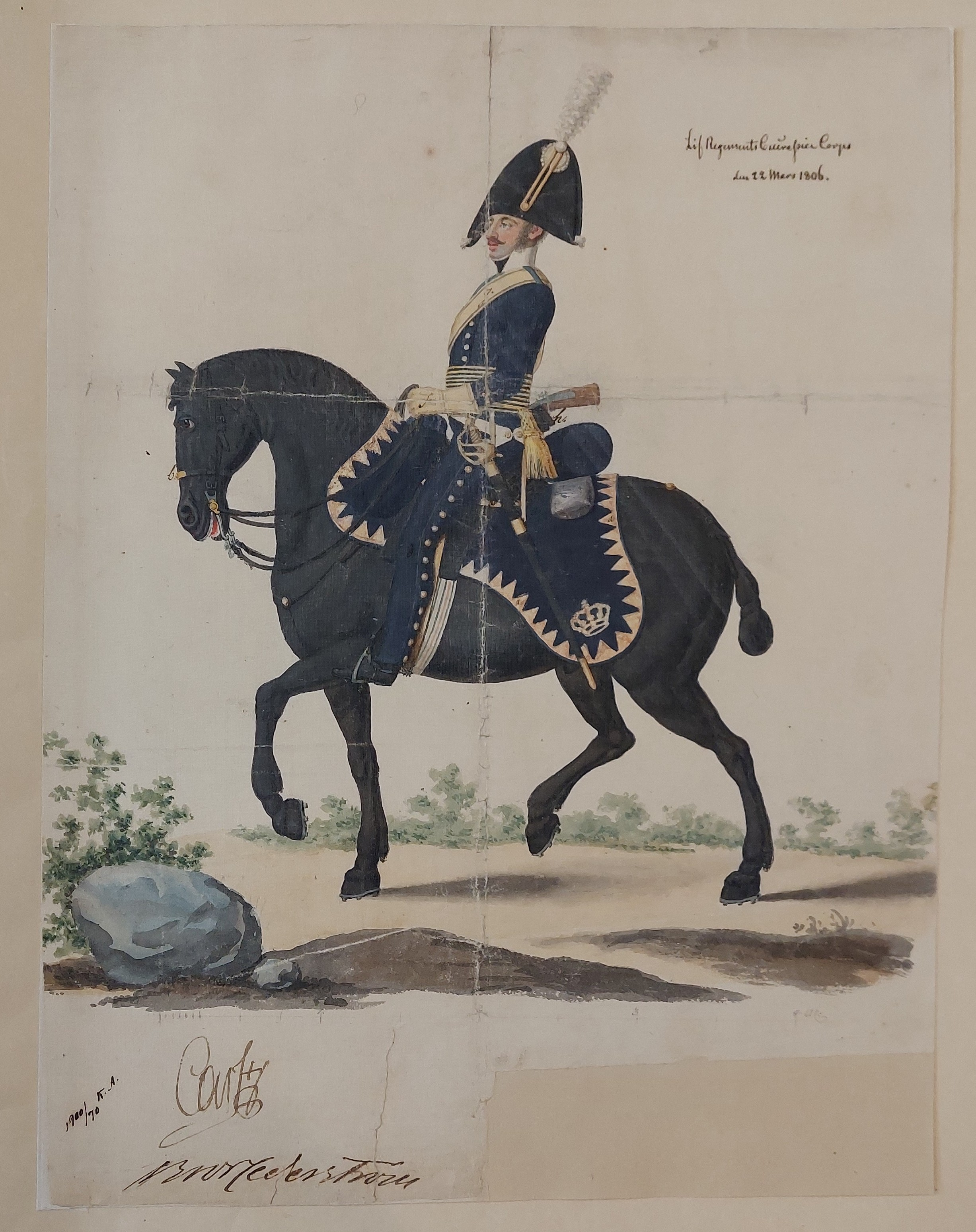
A trooper of the regiment in 1806.

=== Troopers ===
The troopers of the regiment generally wore a dark blue coat with lapels, and a bicorne with a yellow cockade, white plume and a pom-pom that changes colour for each company. They were equipped with a carbine belt in white leather, and a cartridge box which was black with a white leather belt. They also wore a sword belt with a sabretache and a pallasch with the Lesser Coat of Arms of Sweden on it. They also wore cloaks and in 1806, they also started wearing capotes in addition to the cloaks. Regarding pants and footwear they wore buckskin trousers and high black leather boots with white boot collars. For parades they wore a buff coat made of leather which was treated to look like chamois leather.

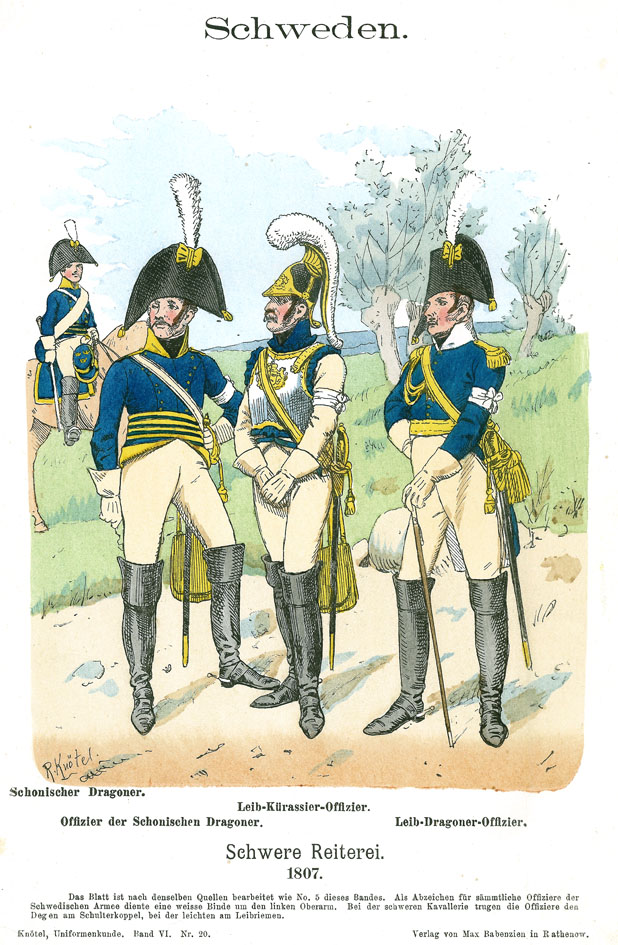
In the center, is an officer of the regiment.

=== Officers and NCOs ===
Officer and non-commissioned officers of the cavalry wore the same rank distinctions as those of the infantry. The helmet was of the same style as those of the troopers, but all metal works were gilded and the raupe was white wool and slightly larger than those of the other ranks.

The officer's coats were as for the men but generally of better quality cloth and after 1807 the facings of the senior officers were of dark blue velvet. All buttons were gilded and embossed with the royal coat of arms. The epaulettes of all rank were gold and followed the same sequence as those of the infantry officers; however, when the cuirass was worn the officers of the Lifregementetsbrigadens kyrassiercorps removed the epaulettes from the coat. From 1807 a 'jala' coat for dismounted ceremonial duties was worn which appears to have been of the same pattern as those of the dragoon officers, single breasted with long tails with double turnbacks. The coat was light buff with facings as for the service tunic.

The officer pattern cuirass and back plate were of polished steel, possibly silver plated for the senior officers with a scalloped edging of gilded brass and a gilded badge of the royal coat-of-arms appeared on the breast. The cuirass was fastened at the shoulders with gilded shoulder scales and the lining and cuff was scarlet leather prior to 1807 and dark blue velvet faced leather after that date.
