= Charlotta Cederström =

Swedish artist (1760–1832)

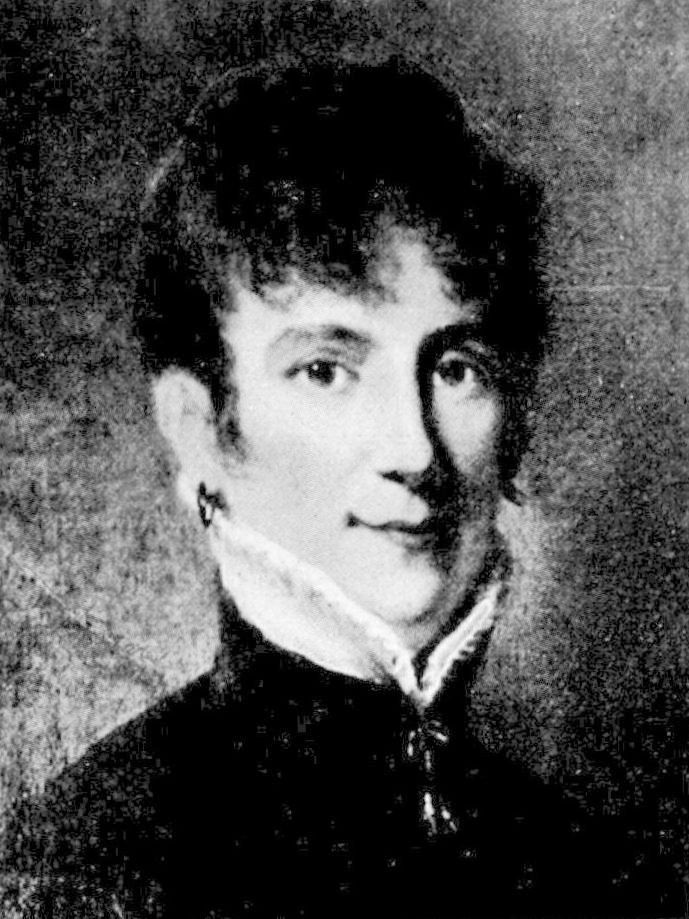
Charlotta Cederström

Christina Charlotta Cederström (née Mörner af Morlanda; 2 March 1760 – 22 February 1832) was a Swedish dilettante artist, composer, salon hostess, and baroness.

Cederström was an honorary member of the Royal Swedish Academy of Arts, as well as an honorary member of the French Académie des Beaux-Arts

== Life ==
Cederström was born on 2 March 1760 at Alvesta in Småland, Sweden. Her parents were Count Gustaf Mörner af Morlanda and Sofia Elisabet Steuch.

In 1780, Cederström married Baron Axel Ture Gyllenkrok, Cederström was the mother of Axel Gustaf Gyllenkrok (1783-1865). The couple lived at Björnstorp Castle in Lund. During this period, Cederström wrote poems and a novel in the style of Rousseau. She drew in ink and Indian ink and painted in oil. She wrote songs and composed music to them, the best known being Välkommen, o måne, min åldrige vän. Cederström divorced Gyllenkrok in 1799.

In 1800, Cederström married Baron Bror Cederström (1754–1816), becoming the stepmother of Gustaf Albrecht Bror Cederström (1780–1877). The family moved to Stockholm, where she established a literary salon and became a central figure in the city's cultural life. She exhibited oil paintings at the Swedish Academy.

In 1803, Cederström was elected an honorary member of both the Swedish and French Academies of Art. She died on 22 February 1832.

== Sources ==
- Berg, Per Gustaf; Stålberg, Wilhelmina, eds. (1864–1866). Anteckningar om svenska qvinnor [Notes on Swedish women] (in Swedish). Stockholm: P. C. Berg.
