= Bror Cederström =

Swedish baron and lieutenant general

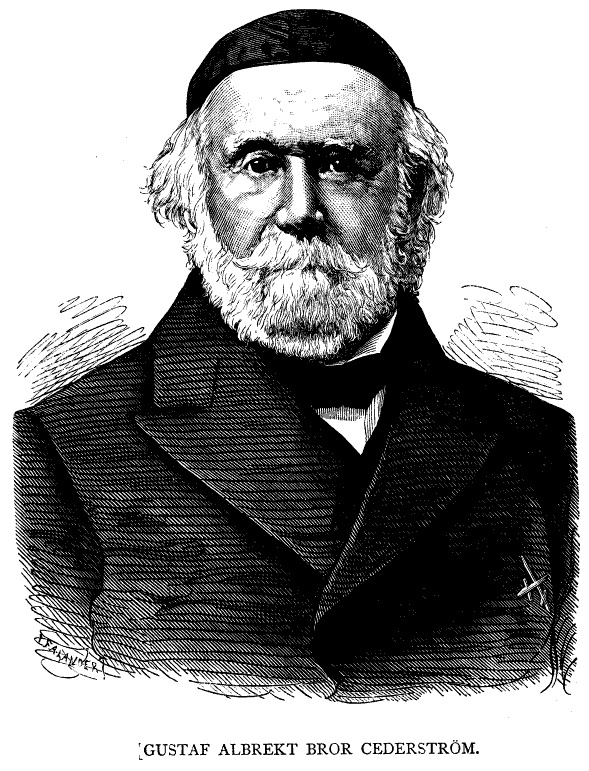
- Cederström in older age. Woodcut by Ida Falander.

Minister of War
- In office 16 May 1840 – 7 December 1840
- Preceded by: First holder
- Succeeded by: Axel Otto Mörner

Personal details
- Born: Gustaf Albrecht Bror Cederström; 21 September 1780 Fornsigtuna, Sweden
- Died: 21 December 1877 (aged 97) Jönköping, Sweden
- Party: Nonpolitical
- Occupation: Military officer

Military service
- Branch/service: Swedish Army
- Years of service: 1792–1840
- Rank: Lieutenant General
- Commands: Cederströmska husarregementet Crown Prince's Hussar Regiment
- Battles/wars: War of the Fourth Coalition; Great Sortie of Stralsund; War of the Sixth Coalition; Battle of Großbeeren; Battle of Dennewitz; Battle of Leipzig; Capture of Lübeck; Battle of Bornhöved; Finnish War

Gustaf Albrecht Bror, Baron Cederström (21 September 1780 – 21 December 1877) was a Swedish baron and lieutenant general and Minister of War.

== Biography ==
Cederström was born at Fornsigtuna, Sweden and was the only child of lieutenant general and later president of the War College, Baron Bror Cederström (1754-1816) and his first wife Catharina Maria Voltemat. The father remarried in 1800 to the author Christina Mörner.

From 1816 to 1822, he headed the Cederströmian Hussar Regiment (Cederströmska husarregementet, previously named the Mörnerian Hussar Regiment, Mörnerska husarregementet, after the previous commander, Hampus Mörner, and later renamed the Crown Prince's Hussar Regiment, when Crown Prince Oscar became its commander) in Scania. During this time, he purchased the Säbyholm's lands outside Landskrona, where he actively worked to find new agricultural methods and established the first Swedish company for manufacturing beet sugar (though he had to sell these lands off and retire to Landskrona when he unexpectedly went bankrupt in 1848). In parallel with his business life he continued a military career, becoming supreme commander of Scania in 1819, then minister for war in 1840. He was awarded the Grand Cross of the Order of the Sword, the Order of the Seraphim and the Grand Cross of the Norwegian Order of St. Olav.

He married countess Christina Hilda Wachtmeister af Johannishus (died 1871) in 1815. They had two sons and two daughters.

Cederström was the stepson of Christina Charlotta Cederström.

Government offices
Preceded by First holder	Minister of War; 1840–1840	Succeeded by Axel Otto Mörner
