= Scanian Hussar Regiment =

- Skånska husarregementet
- Active: 1658–1709, 1709–1927
- Country: Sweden
- Allegiance: Swedish Armed Forces
- Branch: Swedish Army
- Type: Cavalry
- Size: Regiment
- Part of: 1st Military District (1833–1893); 1st Army Division (1893–1901); I Army Division (1902–1927)
- Garrison/HQ: Helsingborg
- Colors: Light blue
- March: "Skånska husarregementets marsch" (unknown) (Note: The march was adopted circa 1850, and was taken over by the Scanian Cavalry Regiment (Skånska kavalleriregementet, K 2) in 1927.)
- Battle honours: Landskrona (1677), Pultusk (1703), Posen (1704), Fraustadt (1706)

Commanders
- Notable commanders: Georg Henrik Lybecker

Insignia
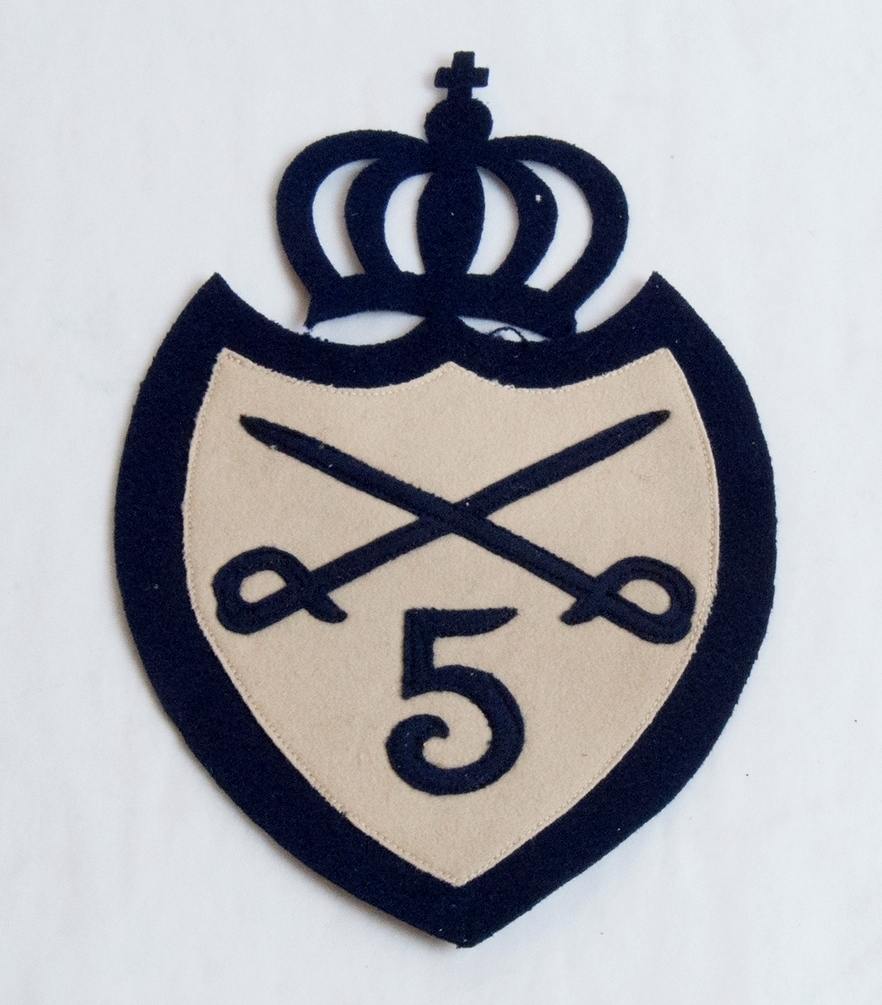
- Shoulder sleeve insignia m/1906

The Scanian Hussar Regiment (Swedish: Skånska husarregementet, K 5) was a Swedish Army cavalry unit which operated in various forms between 1658–1709 and 1709–1927.

== Commanding officers ==
Regimental commanders from 1658 to 1927.

- 1658–1659: Erik Leijonhufvud
- 1659–1679: G H Lybecker
- 1679–1686: Gyllenstierna
- 168?–1694: Nils Gyllenstierna
- 1694?–1694 Carl Gustaf Rehnskiöld
- 1698–1704: H I Ridderhielm
- 1704–1709: Gustaf Horn af Marienborg
- 1709–1719: H Gyllenbielke
- 1719–1727: G D Hasenkampff
- 1727–1753: J C von Düring
- 1753–1762: R Barnekow
- 1762–1762: F U Sparre
- 1762–1765: G A Horn
- 1765–1772: B G Frölich
- 1772–1796: P J B von Platen
- 1796–1809: B Cederström
- 1809–1813: Hans Henric von Essen
- 1813–1824: C Thott
- 1824–1829: H R Horn
- 1829–1841: D H Stierncrona
- 1841–1848: P O Liedberg
- 1848–1853: G A F W von Essen
- 1853–1856: P Sjöcrona
- 1856–1869: F W R Fock
- 1869–1884: Gustaf Oscar Peyron
- 1884–1898: C G Bergenstråhle
- 1898–1907: E T Grönwall
- 1907–1912: Axel Ribbing
- 1912–1916: Philip von Platen
- 1916–1924: Claes Cederström
- 1924–1927: Otto Ramel

== Names, designations and locations ==
Name	Translation	From		To
Kungl. Skånska kavalleriregementet	Royal Scanian Cavalry Regiment	1658-05-21	–	1676
Kungl. Norra skånska kavalleriregementet	Royal Northern Scanian Cavalry Regiment	1676-??-??	–	1801-06-04
Kungl. Skånska linjedragonregementet	Royal Scanian Line Dragoon Regiment	1801-06-05	–	1807-05-31
Kungl. Skånska husarregementet	Royal Scanian Hussar Regiment	1807-06-01	–	1927-12-31
Designation		From		To
No. 5		1816-10-01	–	1914
K 5		1914-10-14	–	1927-12-31
Location		From		To
Tomarps Kungsgård Castle		1804-??-??	–	1858-??-??
Herrevad Abbey		1858-??-??	–	1897-10-31
Helsingborg Garrison		1897-11-01	–	1927-12-31

== See also ==
- List of Swedish cavalry regiments
