= Toverud =

Farm in Aurskog, Akershus, Norway

Toverud is a farm in Aurskog in the municipality of Aurskog-Høland in Akershus county, Norway and the site of the Battle of Toverud (Slaget ved Toverud). During 1908 in connection with the centennial of the battle, the Toverud monument (Toverudstøtta) was erected at the site of the battle.

== Battle of Toverud ==
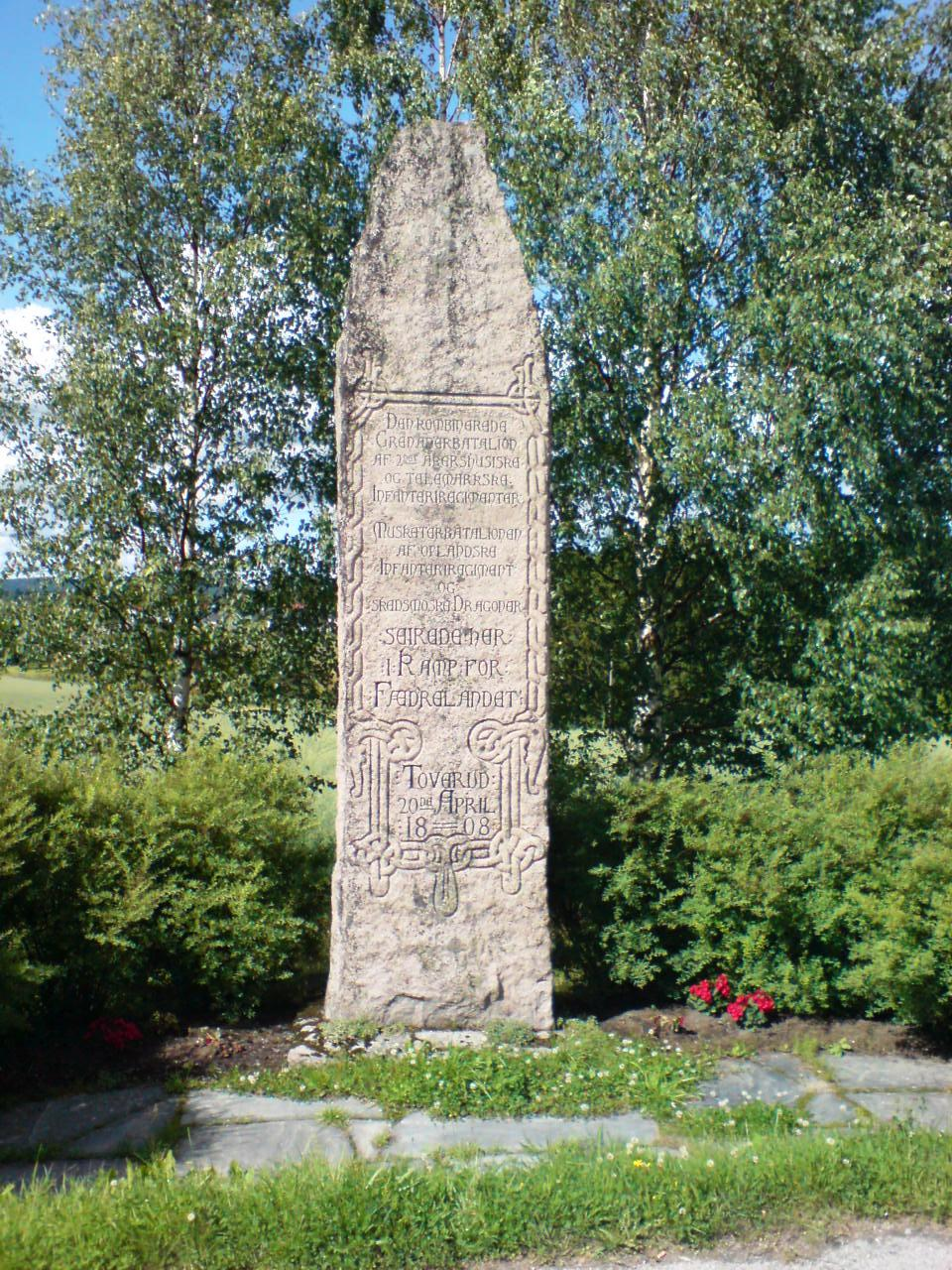
Toverud monument (Toverudstøtta)

In February 1808, Denmark-Norway was forced by Napoleon Bonaparte to declare war on Sweden. On 14 April 1808 a Swedish brigade crossed the border and went west to Aurskog, Norway. After a brief but dramatic battle, Swedish commander Axel Otto Mörner (1774–1852) had to surrender. Danish nobleman Christian August of Augustenborg successfully commanded the army of Norway and compelled the numerically superior Swedish forces to withdraw behind the border after the Battle of Toverud on April 19–20, 1808.

One contributory factor behind the poor performance of the Swedish invasion force in Norway was that Russia had invaded Finland on February 21, 1808, at the start of the Finnish War. The two-front war proved disastrous for Sweden.

The success of Christian August both as a military commander at Toverud and in the subsequent battle on June 10, 1808, at Prestebakke in Østfold, and as leader of the provisional government made him very popular in Norway. In 1808 Christian August was promoted to Field Marshal, and in 1809 he became Governor-general of Norway. Prince Christian August was also held in high esteem within Sweden because he had refrained from pursuing the retreating army of Sweden while that country was hard pressed by Russia in the Finnish War. Consequently, Christian August was elected Crown Prince of Sweden as successor to the Swedish throne after the overthrow of the incompetent King Gustav IV Adolf.

== Other sources ==
- Skar, Johannes Um slaget ved Toverud. Prinsen av Augustenborg (Det Norske Samlaget, Oslo 1897)
- Gjerset, Knut History of The Norwegian People (The Macmillan Company. 1915) ISBN 978-0-217-93246-2
- Elkan, Sophie An Exiled King, Gustaf Adolf IV of Sweden (London: Hutchinson & Co., 1913) ISBN 978-1-177-23318-7
