= Swedish Armed Forces Centre for Defence Medicine =

- Försvarsmedicincentrum
- Active: 1906–present
- Country: Sweden
- Allegiance: Swedish Armed Forces
- Branch: Joint
- Type: Centre
- Role: Military medicine
- Part of: Swedish Armed Forces Headquarters (Note: IV Army Division 1906–1927 Eastern Army Division (1928–1936) IV Army Division (1937–1943) IV Military District (1943–1966) Eastern Military District (1966–1976) Bergslagen Military District (1976–1991) Middle Military District (1991–2000) Joint Forces Command (2000–2005) Swedish Armed Forces Headquarters (2005–present).)
- Garrison/HQ: Gothenburg
- Motto: Vita praeponitu ("We put life first") (Note: The motto was established on 8 January 1998.)
- March: "Donaugruss" (Král) (Note: The march was adopted and established on 9 January 1998. The march was used by Blekinge Battalion and Värmlands fältjägarkår from the end of the 19th century to 1901.)

Commanders
- Current commander: COL Filip Scheynius

The Swedish Armed Forces Centre for Defence Medicine (Swedish: Försvarsmedicincentrum, FömedC) is a tri-service military medicine center in the Swedish Armed Forces. Its staff is made up of officers, civilian specialists, group commanders and officer reservists – tasked with ensuring care is provided during peacetime, on international missions, at times of crisis and in combat.

== History ==
The Swedish Armed Forces Center for Defence Medicine has its roots in the Medical Board of the Royal Swedish Army Materiel Administration (and the Medical Inspectorate), which was established in 1906. On 1 January 1944, the Medical Services Administration of the Swedish Armed Forces (Försvarets sjukvårdsförvaltning) was established. The Medical Services Administration of the Swedish Armed Forces took over tasks that had previously been entrusted to the Royal Swedish Army Materiel Administration, the Royal Swedish Naval Materiel Administration and the Royal Swedish Air Force Materiel Administration. The tasks of the Medical Services Administration of the Swedish Armed Forces were to exercise, in technical and economic terms, the management and oversight of the Swedish Armed Forces's health care. More elaborate were the activities of the Medical Services Administration, military hospitals, health care services, the medical equipment, the medical supplies and medicines, funds management, administrative matters in general, remittance cases from the King in Council or head of ministry and assistant to the Supreme Commander, the chiefs of the Army, Navy and Air Force, etc. in health care issues. The inspection activities within the Army, Navy and Air Force medical services were the responsibility of the Surgeon-in-Chief of the Swedish Army, the Surgeon-in-Chief of the Swedish Navy and the Surgeon-in-Chief of the Swedish Air Force.

On 1 July 1949, the unit was renamed the Medical Board of the Swedish Armed Forces (Försvarets sjukvårdsstyrelse). The name change was not prompted by a changed organization. The Medical Board of the Swedish Armed Forces exercised the management and supervision of the health care within the Swedish Armed Forces. Within the board, a medical corps office was established and for this reason, the SFS 1969:409 instruction from 1 July 1969 meant that the Swedish Army Medical Corps, the Swedish Naval Medical Officers’ Corps and the Swedish Army Veterinary Corps was now referred to as the Medical Corps of the Swedish Armed Forces. From 1 January 1974, there were pharmaceutical expertise on the board which was directly subordinate to the Surgeon-General of the Swedish Armed Forces, when the same SFS 1973:953 instruction for military pharmacies expired. The Medical Board of the Swedish Armed Forces ceased on 30 June 1994. Large parts of the operations were transferred on 1 July of that year to the newly formed Medical Center of the Swedish Armed Forces (Försvarets sjukvårdscentrum, FSC) in Hammarö, Karlstad.

Prior to the Defence Act of 2004, the Swedish government proposed to the Riksdag that the Medical Center of the Swedish Armed Forces should be relocated from Hammarö to Gothenburg. The background was that the Artillery Regiment (A 9) in Kristinehamn was proposed to be relocated to Boden Garrison. Hence, the Medical Center of the Swedish Armed Forces would become a solitaire in Värmland, something the government felt would increase the Swedish Armed Forces' long-term overall operations. In the government's proposal, a disbandment of the 4th Marine Regiment (Amf 4) was proposed, which would allow the Medical Center of the Swedish Armed Forces to utilize the liberated educational capacity in Gothenburg. The fact that Gothenburg was proposed as a new location was also partly due to an inquiry (SOU 1992:101) on the Command and Government Organization for the Swedish Armed Forces (LEMO). The inquiry had, among other things, looked at the Swedish Armed Forces' health and medical care. The arguments put forward at that time the government considered largely valid. Among other things, the argument put forward by the inquiry in 1992 that the operations could be conducted in all the three localities in question, ie Gothenburg, Solna and Karlstad.

From 1 September 2005, the Swedish Armed Forces Medical Center (Försvarsmaktens sjukvårdscentrum) began operating in Gothenburg. Remaining in Hammarö was a decommissioning organization, which operated there until 31 December 2005. From 1 January 2006, the entire center operated in Gothenburg, at the same time the Elfsborg Group (Elfsborgsgruppen) was added as part of the Swedish Armed Forces Medical Center. This was when the Southern Military District was disbanded on 31 December 2005. As a further cost-cutting and coordination, in June 2006, the Swedish Armed Forces proposed that the Swedish Armed Forces Medical Center should be reorganized as the Swedish Air Force Centre for Aviation Medicine (Flygmedicincentrum, FMC) and the Swedish Armed Forces Diving and Naval Medicine Centre be amalgamated into the Swedish Armed Forces Medical Center. The new organization would apply from 1 January 2007, and at the same time, the Swedish Armed Forces Medical Center adopted the name Swedish Armed Forces Centre for Defence Medicine (Försvarsmedicincentrum).

On 1 January 2013, four military regions were formed, in which the Western Military Region was subordinate to the commander of the Skaraborg Regiment, but reported to the Chief of Joint Operations in the Swedish Armed Forces Headquarters regarding territorial command in peace, crisis and war. However, the commander of the Elfsborg Group was still subordinate to the head of the Swedish Armed Forces Centre for Defence Medicine regarding production management of Home Guard units as well as operational command in the geographical area of the training groups. However, on 1 January 2018, the command of Skaraborg Regiment and the Western Military Region was divided, by appointing a separate executive position for the Western Military Region. In addition, the staff of the Western Military Region was directly assigned to the Chief of Joint Operations in the Swedish Armed Forces Headquarters in command issues. In the Swedish Armed Forces' budget for the 2020 government, it was proposed that the four military regional staffs should be set up as their own organizational units from 1 January 2020. The commanders of the military regional staffs were in turn proposed to be subjected to the Chief of Home Guard regarding the production of training groups and Home Guard units. This meant that the training groups were transferred organizationally from a training unit to the four military regional staffs. In the government's proposition, however, the government emphasized that the military regional division could be adjusted, depending on the outcome of the inquiry "Responsibility, leadership and coordination in civil defence" (dir. 2018:79). For the Swedish Armed Forces Centre for Defence Medicine, this change meant that the Elfsborg Group was transferred to the Western Military Region from 1 January 2020.

== Units ==
=== Current units ===
- Defence Medicine Unit (Försvarsmedicinska enheten), is the Swedish Armed Forces functional center for defence medicine, including strategic personnel supply, recruitment, staffing and training of the Swedish Armed Forces' licensed health and medical personnel. There is also defence medical research and ability development. The unit demands, monitors and evaluates the medical capabilities of the service branches, as well as coordinates and focuses on medical operations management, intelligence service and defence medicine training. Part of the operations is located in Linköping.
- 1st and 2nd Hospital Companies (Första och andra sjukhuskompanierna), together with the four Home Guard battalions, constitute the Swedish Armed Forces Centre for Defence Medicine's response units. In principle, there are two complete mobile hospitals that fully extend to the surface of six football pitches each. They are flexible and can be set up anywhere at any place. The companies include officers, soldiers and civilians. The majority are healthcare professionals and there are categories that work full-time, part-time or are duty-placed staff.
  - 1st Hospital Company (Första sjukhuskompaniet), belongs since January 2013 to the Swedish Armed Forces Centre for Defence Medicine. The company has both full and part-time employees with a large number of specialists represented. The 1st Hospital Company has 168 positions, both soldiers, officers and civilians, full or part-time employees. There are a number of specialists in the company: plumber, electrician, chef, pharmacist, X-ray physician, psychiatrist, pastor, surgeon, anesthesiologist, medical secretary, dentist, biomedical analyst, soldier, officer, district nurse, anesthesia nurse, surgery nurse, intensive care nurse, X-ray nurse and general nurse. The company includes a staff platoon, a surgery platoon, a nursing platoon, a medical service squad and a logistics platoon.
  - 2nd Hospital Company (Andra sjukhuskompaniet), belongs since January 2013 to the Swedish Armed Forces Centre for Defence Medicine. The company has both full and part-time employees with a large number of specialists represented. The 2nd Hospital Company has 168 positions, both soldiers, officers and civilians, full or part-time employees. There are a number of specialists in the company: plumber, electrician, chef, pharmacist, X-ray physician, psychiatrist, pastor, surgeon, anesthesiologist, medical secretary, dentist, biomedical analyst, soldier, officer, district nurse, anesthesia nurse, surgical nurse, intensive care nurse, X-ray nurse and general nurse. What distinguishes the 2nd Hospital Company and the 1st Hospital Company is that the 2nd Hospital Company consists of more part-time employees. The company includes a staff platoon, a surgery platoon, a nursing platoon, a medical service squad and a logistics platoon.
- Elfsborg Group (Elfsborgsgruppen), train, exercises and develops the four Home Guard battalions in Gothenburg and the Sjuhärad area and supports the voluntary organizations. Home Guard units are modern war unit with the main task of protecting, monitoring and surface monitoring as well as supporting the Swedish society in times of crisis. The group also has a company that provides basic training to soldiers for war units.
- Local Planning Unit West (Lokalplaneringsenhet Väst), supports units and garrison commanders in the Western Military Region with the acquisition, maintenance and decommissioning of land, facilities and premises. The unit has its management in Gothenburg with staff located at all garrisons in the area.
- Garrison Unit (Garnisonsenheten), supports the garrison with infrastructure, sports and wellness, training areas as well as access control and guarding of objects. There is also the Försvarshälsan Göteborg ("Defence Health Service Gothenburg"), which is tasked with providing health care for soldiers, sailors, recruits and students with recruitment benefits. Occupational health care for all employees and medical preparedness for certain exercises is also included.
- Logistics Unit (Logistikenheten), is responsible for logistics support for all military units and units in the garrison. The support consists, among other things, of stockpiling of war supplies and for daily operations, fuel and ammunition supplies and technical service. The unit also has support responsibility in Skredsvik.

== Locations and training areas ==
=== Barracks ===
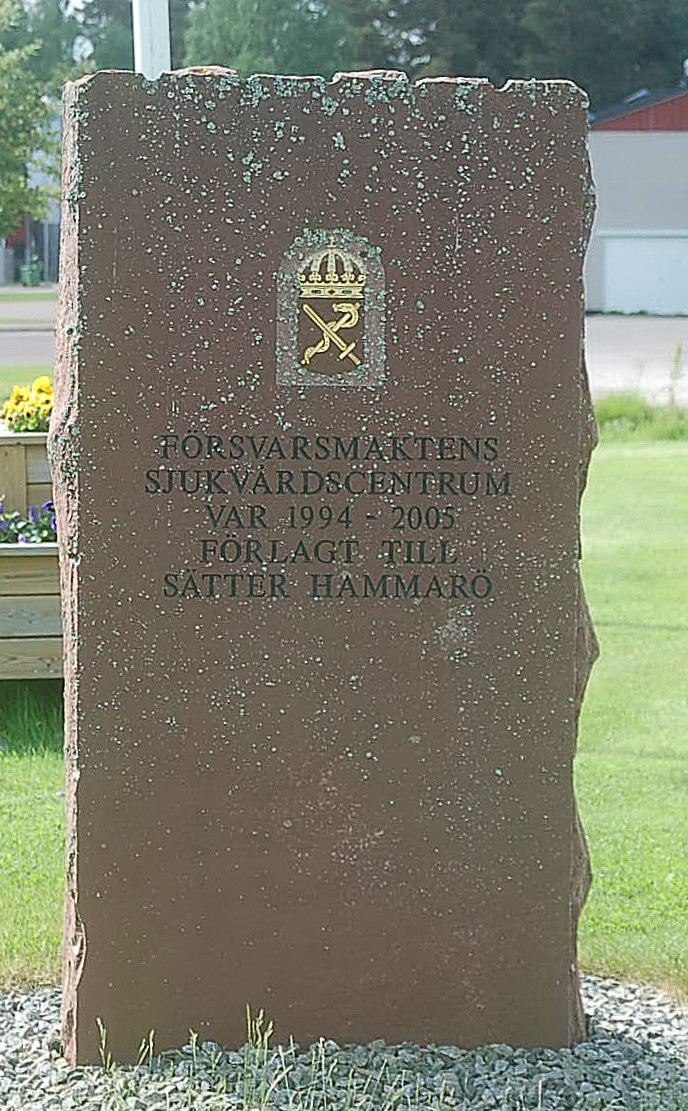
Memorial stone in Hammarö.

Until 1976, the Swedish Armed Forces Centre for Defence Medicine and its predecessors were located in Stockholm Garrison. From 1976, the Medical Board of the Swedish Armed Forces (Försvarets sjukvårdsstyrelse) moved to Karlstad, and was located at the Karolinen property complex in central Karlstad. In connection with the reorganization of the Medical Board of the Swedish Armed Forces and renaming it to the Medical Center of the Swedish Armed Forces (Försvarets sjukvårdscentrum), the center was moved to Sätterstrand in Hammarö Municipality. Sätterstrand had been a nursing home since the 1960s. In Hammarö, the center consisted of about 20 buildings. After the Swedish Armed Forces left the area in Hammarö, the area has been developed into a business park with a focus on business development.

When the center was relocated to Gothenburg, it took over the barracks erected in Västra Frölunda in 1942 for the Älvsborg Coastal Artillery Regiment (KA 4), later used by the 4th Marine Regiment (Amf 4). After the 4th Marine Regiment was disbanded through the Defence Act of 2004, the Swedish Armed Forces Centre for Defence Medicine took over the barracks.

=== Detachment ===
The Swedish Armed Forces Centre for Defence Medicine has since 1 January 2007 a detachment in Linköping. This was after the Swedish Air Force Centre for Aviation Medicine (Flygmedicincentrum, FMC) was disbanded, and its operations were organized into the Swedish Armed Forces Centre for Defence Medicine.

=== Training areas ===
The Swedish Armed Forces Centre for Defence Medicine manages two training areas in the Gothenburg region. However, Sisjön Training Area is managed by Skaraborg Regiment. On 5 September 2019, the commander of the Naval Base, Commander Håkan Nilsson handed over the management responsibility for two training areas and the garrison responsibility for the Gullmars Base (Gullmarsbasen) to the head of the Swedish Armed Forces Centre for Defence Medicine, Colonel Peter Fredriksson. The background and reason was that the nearest unit should be responsible for training areas and have garrison responsibility for units in the geographical area.

== Heraldry and traditions ==
=== Coat of arms ===
A coat of arms was used by the Medical Board of the [Swedish] Armed Forces and Surgeon-General of the Swedish Armed Forces from 1943 to 1994. Blazon: "Azure, the lesser coat of arms of Sweden, three open crowns or placed two and one. The shield surmounting a sword bendwise and a rod of Asclepius bendwise sinister in saltire, all or." Another coat of arms was used by the Medical Center of the Swedish Armed Forces from 1994. Blazon: "Gules, a sword and a rod of Asclepius in saltire, all or. The shield surmounting an erect sword orf the last colour".

Coat of arms used from 1943 to 1994.

Current coat of arms.

=== Colours, standards and guidons ===
The units colour comes in the form of a double swallow-tailed Swedish flag which was presented to FSC in Hammarö by the Supreme Commander, General Johan Hederstedt on 6 June 2002.

=== Traditions ===
The unit retains the traditional heritage primarily from Älvsborg Regiment (I 15), the Swedish Armed Forces Medical Center (FSC) and the Swedish Air Force Centre for Aviation Medicine (Flygmedicincentrum, FMC), and secondarily from the Swedish Armed Forces Medical College (Försvarets sjukvårdshögskola, FSjvHS).

== Commanding officers ==
Until 30 June 1994, the Surgeon-General of the Swedish Armed Forces was also the head of the Medical Corps of the Swedish Armed Forces and head of the Medical Board of the Swedish Armed Forces.

=== Commanders ===
- 1944-01-01 – 1952-10-01: David Lindsjö
- 1952–1964: Carl Erik Groth
- 1964–1974: Carl-Johan Clemedson
- 1975–1981: Åke Lindgren
- 1979–1980: Bo Rybeck (acting)
- 1981–1985: Bo Rybeck
- 1985–1994: Rear Admiral Björn Zetterström
- 1994-07-01 – 1999-04-30: Commander Tomas Wilén
- 1999-05-01 – 2001-06-30: Colonel Tommy W. Johansson
- 2001-07-01 – 2005-05-31: Colonel Eskil Dalenius
- 2005-06-01 – 2006-12-31: Colonel Bo Andersson
- 2007 – 2010-12-31: Commander Lennart Bengtsson
- 2011-01-01 – 2011-03-31: Colonel Leif Härdig (acting)
- 2011-04-01 – 2014-05-28: Colonel Mikael Åkerström
- 2014-05-28 – 2014-09-30: Colonel Leif Härdig (acting)
- 2014-10-01 – 2018-09-30: Colonel Peter Adolfsson
- 2018-09-01 – 2022-10-31: Colonel Peter Fredriksson
- 2022-11-01 – 2023-05-30: Lieutenant colonel Göran Sandström (acting)
- 2023-06-01 – 2025: Colonel Malin J Ekenberg
- 2025-12-11 – present: Colonel Filip Scheynius

=== Deputy commanders ===
- 2019-06-?? – present: Göran Sandström

== Names, designations and locations ==
Name	Translation	From		To
Kungl. Arméförvaltningens sjukvårdsstyrelse	Medical Board of the Royal Swedish Army Materiel Administration	1906-??-??	–	1943-12-31
Försvarets sjukvårdsförvaltning	Medical Services Administration of the [Swedish] Armed Forces	1944-01-01	–	1949-06-30
Försvarets sjukvårdsstyrelse	Medical Board of the [Swedish] Armed Forces; Swedish Armed Forces Medical Board; Swedish Armed Forces Medical Service	1949-07-01	–	1994-06-30
Försvarets sjukvårdscentrum	Medical Center of the Swedish Armed Forces	1994-07-01	–	2000-06-30
Försvarsmaktens sjukvårdscentrum	Swedish Armed Forces Medical Center	2000-07-01	–	2006-12-31
Försvarsmedicincentrum	Swedish Armed Forces Centre for Defence Medicine	2007-01-01	–	
Designation		From		To
KASS		1906-??-??	–	1943-12-31
FSF		1944-01-01	–	1949-06-30
SjvS		1949-07-01	–	1994-06-30
FSC		1994-07-01	–	2006-12-31
FömedC		2007-01-01	–	
Location		From		To
Stockholm Garrison		1906-??-??	–	1976-??-??
Karlstad Garrison/Karolinen		1976-??-??	–	1994-06-30
Karlstad Garrison/Hammarö		1994-07-01	–	2005-12-31
Gothenburg Garrison		2005-09-01	–	
