= Gustav Hesselblad =

Swedish physician

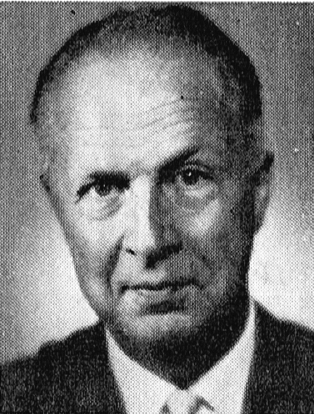
- Born: 29 May 1906; Malmö, Sweden
- Died: 7 March 1989 (aged 82); Stockholm, Sweden
- Education: Lund University
- Years active: 1933–1971
- Medical career
- Profession: Surgeon
- Field: Military medicine
- Institutions: Falköping Hospital, Löwenströmska Hospital, Red Cross Hospital, Norrköping Hospital, Visby Hospital, Sankt Erik Hospital
- Awards: See below

Gustaf (Gustav) Hesselblad (29 May 1906 – 7 March 1989) was a Swedish physician. He served as Surgeon-in-Chief of the Swedish Army from 1960 to 1971 and head of the Swedish Army Medical Corps from 1960 to 1969.

== Early life ==
Hesselblad was born on 29 May 1906 in Malmö Saint Petri Parish (Malmö S:t Petri församling), Skåne County, Sweden, the son of Frans Gustaf Hesselblad, a factory manager, and his wife Elise Josefsson. He received a Licentiate of Medical Science degree from Lund University in 1933.

== Career ==
Hesselblad held various doctor positions between 1933 and 1938, and served as first assistant physician in Visby in 1939 (acting in 1938). He became battalion surgeon in the Swedish Army Medical Corps in 1939 and served in the Svea Logistic Corps in 1940 and as health inspector in 1943. He was appointed army surgeon in the III Military District Staff in 1945 and became byråöverläkare in the Medical Board of the Swedish Armed Forces in 1953 and thus also became a member of the Medical Preparedness Committee of the National Swedish Board of Health (Medicinalstyrelsens sjukvårdsberedskapsnämnd) from the same year.

Hesselblad served as Surgeon-in-Chief of the Swedish Army and head of the Swedish Army Medical Corps from 1960 to 1969 after which he served as Surgeon-in-Chief of the Swedish Army and head of the Medical Corps Office (Medicinalkårsexpeditionen) in the Medical Board of the Swedish Armed Forces from 1969 to 1971.

== Death ==
Hesselblad died on 7 March 1989 in Oscar Parish, Stockholm.

== Awards and decorations ==
- (Sweden) Commander of the Order of the Polar Star (6 June 1961)
- (Sweden) Knight of the Order of the Polar Star (1953)
- (Sweden) Knight of the Order of Vasa (1948)

== Honours ==
- Member of the Royal Swedish Academy of War Sciences (1957)

Military offices
Preceded by Eugén Strömberg	Surgeon-in-Chief of the Swedish Army; 1960–1971	Succeeded by None
Preceded by Eugén Strömberg	Swedish Army Medical Corps; 1960–1969	Succeeded by None
