= Kihlstedt =

Kihlstedt is a surname. Notable people with the surname include:

- Carla Kihlstedt (born 1971), American composer, violinist, vocalist, and multi-instrumentalist
- Magnus Kihlstedt (born 1972), Swedish footballer
- Rya Kihlstedt (born 1970), American actress
- Sigurd Kihlstedt (1897–1953), Swedish military surgeon

== See also ==
- Kohlstedt
