= Gunnar Krantz =

Gunnar Krantz may refer to:

- Gunnar Krantz (artist), artist
- Gunnar Krantz (sailor), sailor
- Gunnar Krantz (veterinarian), veterinarian
