= Troell =

Troell is a Swedish surname. Notable people with the surname include:

- Jan Troell (born 1931), Swedish film director
- Lars Troell (1916–1998), Swedish surgeon
