= Swedish Army Veterinary Corps =

Former administrative corps for veterinarians of the Swedish Army (1887-1969)

- Fältveterinärkåren
- Active: 1887–1969
- Country: Sweden
- Allegiance: Swedish Armed Forces
- Branch: Swedish Army
- Type: Administrative corps/Personnel branch
- Role: Veterinary medicine
- Size: 10-45 people

Commanders
- Notable commanders: Gunnar Krantz

The Swedish Army Veterinary Corps (Swedish: Fältveterinärkåren) was an administrative corps for veterinarians of the Swedish Army from 1887 to 1969. Its task was, in peace as well as in war, to provide army units etcetera with especially trained staff for veterinary positions in the army.

== History ==
=== 1887–1925 ===
The Swedish Army Veterinary Corps was established in 1887 and constituted all veterinarians of the Swedish Army, previously summarized under the common name of the Veterinärstaten. The corps was under the command of the Överfältläkaren ("Surgeon-General") and consisted of a field veterinarian (with the rank of major), 14 regimental veterinarians (with the rank of the captain), 26 battalion veterinarians (with the rank of lieutenant) and 8 veterinarian scholarship recipients (with the rank of underlöjtnant after the officers). The corps had their own military reserve. Positions in the corps were applied to at the National Swedish Medical Services Board (Sjukvårdsstyrelsen), which together with the National Swedish Board of Health delivered proposals to the King in Council. Scholarship was jointly ordered by the National Swedish Medical Board and the National Swedish Board of Health.

In 1923, the staff of the Swedish Army Veterinary Corps was made up of active duty personnel, half-pay officers (reservstat) and military reserve. Active duty personnel occurred both out of and in troop units. Out of troop units: at the National Swedish Board of Health: 1 Veterinary Surgeon-in-Chief of the Swedish Army (Överfältveterinär) and 1 senior clerical officer (regimental veterinarian); at staffs and more: 6 field veterinarians, 1 at each Army Division Staff, 1 regimental veterinarian at Boden Garrison, 1 battalion veterinarians each at the Gotland military commander, Karlsborg Garrison and the Swedish Army Riding and Horse-Driving School at Strömsholm Palace. In troop units: 9 regimental veterinarians and 24 battalion veterinarians. Half-pay officers constituted 1 field veterinarians, 4 regimental veterinarians and 2 battalion veterinarians. These were obliged for military service in war and when conscripts were called in for the defence of the kingdom, as well as in peace for a maximum of 50 days during each 2-year period of service after the age of 48 and for no more than 100 days of each 3-year period up to the age of 48. The reserve staff constituted veterinarians who, with the right to a supplementary pension, resigned from active service or applied to depart from such active service, were admitted to the reserve and veterinarians who received their first employment.

Veterinarians in the military reserve were obliged to service as veterinarian as half-pay officers and, in addition, were required to complete rehearsal training, partly after recruitment, and subsequently every three years until the age of 40 years. Military veterinary posts belonged to the following service classes: Veterinary Surgeon-in-Chief of the Swedish Army (lieutenant colonel), field veterinarian (major), regimental veterinarian (captain), battalion veterinarian (older, captain (conditionally), younger, lieutenant). The Veterinary Surgeon-in-Chief of the Swedish Army could obtain colonels rank, and field veterinarian on active service lieutenant colonel and regimental veterinarian on active service major, respectively after 25 and 20 years of well-documented service. The eldest battalion veterinarian on active service could be assigned the captain's rank. The staff in the Swedish Army Veterinary Corps, as well as the half-pay officers held corresponding employment positions. The staff of the Swedish Army Veterinary Corps were under the supervision of the Medical Board of the Royal Swedish Army Materiel Administration regarding its military-veterinary service and by the National Swedish Medical Board regarding its medical activities.

=== 1925–1937 ===
According to the Defence Act of 1925, the corps would consist of 1 Veterinary Surgeon-in-Chief of the Swedish Army, 4 field veterinarians (division veterinarians), 6 regimental veterinarians and 15 battalion veterinarians. Of the regimental veterinarians, 1 was employed by the commandant in Boden and 1 in each of the Norrland Dragoon Regiment, Svea Artillery Regiment, Göta Artillery Regiment and Wendes Artillery Regiment and the Royal Swedish Army Materiel Administration. Of the battalion veterinarians, 1 was employed at the Swedish Army Riding and Horse-Driving School, 1 at each of the Life Regiment Dragoons, Life Regiment Hussars, Scanian Cavalry Regiment (Skånska kavalleriregementet), all field artillery regiments, Svea Engineer Corps and Göta Engineer Corps, the Field Telegraph Corps and all service troop corps. The relevant division veterinary held the regimental veterinary services at the Life Regiment Dragoons, Life Regiment Hussars, Scanian Cavalry Regiment and Norrland Artillery Regiment.

=== 1937–1969 ===
At the beginning of 1937, all 26 postings on active service, namely 1 Veterinary Surgeon-in-Chief of the Swedish Army, 4 field veterinarians, 6 regimental veterinarians and 15 battalion veterinarians, were filled by ordinary holders. As of 1 July 1937, the Swedish Army Veterinary Corps' part of the Defence Act of 1936 came into force. According to this, the active service staff would constitute 1 Veterinary Surgeon-in-Chief of the Swedish Army, 4 field veterinarians, 8 regimental veterinarians and 11 battalion veterinarians.

Previously, the military veterinary service in Sweden had been placed under the Army's Healthcare Board (Arméns sjukvårdsstyrelse) with the Surgeon-Field General as highest commander, but from 1937 the military veterinary service had been separated from the army's healthcare service as the Field Veterinary Office (Fältveterinärbyrån), previously included in the Healthcare Board, was partly transferred to the newly established Veterinary Inspectorate (Veterinärinspektionen) with the Veterinary Surgeon-in-Chief of the Swedish Army as its head, and partly to the same newly established Horse and Veterinary Office (Häst- och veterinärbyrån) in the Commissariat Department (Intendenturdepartementet). The Inspector of Army Veterinary Service thus became the head of the Swedish Army Veterinary Corps instead of the former Surgeon-Field General. The Veterinary Inspectorate (later the Army Inspectorate's Veterinary Department) handle and settled questions regarding veterinary staff, education, and horse health care, etc., that is, all military veterinary issues. Appropriations related to equipment and horses, remount, horse selection, etc., were handled by the Horse and Veterinary Equipment Office (Häst- och veterinärmaterielbyrån) of the Commissariat Service Department (Intendenturavdelningen) (formerly the Commissariat Department, Intendenturdepartementet) with the Inspector of Army Veterinary Service as director.

In early 1954, the active staff consisted of 1 Inspector of Army Veterinary Service, 7 field veterinarians, 7 regimental veterinarians and 9 battalion veterinarians. The corps ceased in 1969 (SFS 1969:409) by merging the Swedish Army Veterinary Corps, the Swedish Army Medical Corps and the Swedish Naval Medical Officers’ Corps into the Medical Corps of the Swedish Armed Forces.

== Commanding officers ==
The head of the Swedish Army Veterinary Corps was called Överfältläkare ("Surgeon-General") (1887–1914), then Generalfältläkare ("Surgeon-Field General") (23 December 1914–1937), and then Överfältveterinär. (Note: Translated as Veterinary Surgeon-in-Chief of the Swedish Army, Inspector of Army Veterinary Service" or Chief of Veterinary Corps.) He was also head of the Veterinary Inspectorate (Veterinärinspektionen).

=== Surgeons-General of the Swedish Armed Forces ===
- 1914–1917: Anton Nettelblad
- 1917–1930: Fritz Bauer
- 1930–1937: Richard Erhardt

=== Veterinary Surgeons-in-Chief of the Swedish Army ===
- 1919–1921: Peter Schmidt
- 1937–1945: Axel Morén
- 1945–1957: Erik Liljefors
- 1957–1969: Gunnar Krantz
