= Sigurd Kihlstedt =

Swedish physician

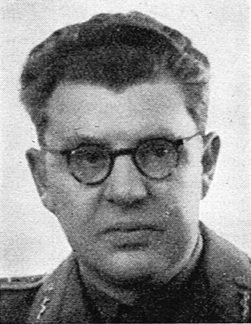
- Born: Sigurd Wilhelm Kihlstedt; 14 March 1897; Östersund, Sweden
- Died: 14 October 1953 (aged 56); Stockholm, Sweden
- Years active: 1922–1953
- Medical career
- Profession: Physician
- Field: Military medicine, neurology, psychiatry
- Institutions: Serafimerlasarettet, Stockholm Hospital, Karlskrona Municipal Mental Hospital
- Awards: See below

Sigurd Wilhelm Kihlstedt (14 March 1897 – 14 October 1953) was a Swedish physician. He served as Surgeon-in-Chief of the Swedish Army and head of the Swedish Army Medical Corps from 1943 to 1953 and Deputy Surgeon-General of the Swedish Armed Forces from 1949 to 1953.

== Early life ==
Kihlstedt was born on 14 March 1897 in Östersund, Sweden, the son of Lieutenant Colonel Erik Alfred Edmund Kihlstedt and his wife Kristiane Marie-Louise (Wiesen) Becker. He passed studentexamen in Stockholm in 1916 and received a Bachelor of Medical Sciences degree in 1920 and a Licentiate of Medical Science degree in Stockholm in 1927.

== Career ==
=== Medical career ===
Kihlstedt held various assistant physician and teaching assistant positions between 1922 and 1928, including at Solna nursing home in Solna in 1924, in neurology at the Serafimerlasarettet's neurology clinic in Stockholm from 1924 to 1926 and in psychiatry at Stockholm Hospital from 1926 to 1928. He served as acting second city physician in Karlskrona from 1930 to 1935, acting first city physician and doctor at Karlskrona birthing center and Epidemic Hospital for a total of 25 months between 1930 and 1938. Kihlstedt worked as a doctor in Karlskrona's southern district between 1935 and 1939, at Karlskrona Municipal Mental Hospital (Karlskrona kommunala sinnessjukhus) between 1931 and 1939, at Ramdala retirement home between 1932 and 1939 and as a prison doctor between 1933 and 1939, as well as a school doctor between 1935 and 1939. Kihlstedt was National Swedish Board of Health's representative in the Southeast Sweden Central Health Insurance Service (Sydöstra Sveriges Centralsjukkassa) from 1933 and 1940.

Kihlstedt belonged to the Karlskrona City Council (Karlskrona stadsfullmäktige) from 1936 to 1939, elected by The Right. He was also a member of the City Public Health Board (Hälsovårdsnämnden), the Temperance Board (Nykterhetsnämnden), the Pension Board (Pensionsnämnden) and the City Building Committee (Byggnadsnämnden) in Karlskrona. Kihlstedt was chairman of Karlskrona Medical Association (Karlskrona Läkareförening) from 1936 to 1937.

=== Military career ===
Kihlstedt began his medical military career in 1924 when he became a fältläkarstipendiat ("field surgeon student") in the reserve. He became the same in the Swedish Army Medical Corps in 1926. Kihlstedt served as a battalion surgeon in Kronoberg Regiment's detachment in Karlskrona from 1928 to 1939. He then served as an army surgeon (fältläkare) in the 1st Army Division (Första arméfördelningen), later the I Military District Staff from 1939 to 1943. In 1943, Kihlstedt was appointed Surgeon-in-Chief of the Swedish Army and head of the Swedish Army Medical Corps. He was thus also a surgeon at the Swedish State Railways, at the National Swedish Railway Board's (Järnvägsstyrelsen) first district for the Machinery Department's staff at Stockholm Central Station, the section superintendents offices in Stockholm and the travel agency. In 1949, he became Deputy Surgeon-General of the Swedish Armed Forces. Kihlstedt served in these positions until his death in 1953.

== Personal life ==
In 1928, Kihlstedt married Annie Emmy Charlotta Scheutz (1898–1986), the daughter of Komminister H. T. S. and Anna Johansson. They had three children: Gunilla Elisabet (born 1930), Ingrid Birgitta (born 1932) and Lars-Erik Herman (born 1936).

== Awards and decorations ==
=== Swedish ===
- (Sweden) Commander 1st Class of the Order of the Polar Star (6 June 1951)
- (Sweden) Commander 2nd Class of the Order of the Polar Star (6 June 1947)
- (Sweden) Knight of the Order of the Polar Star (1945)
- (Sweden) Knight of the Order of Vasa (1940)

=== Foreign ===
- Commander 1st Class of the Order of the Lion of Finland
- (Norway) King Haakon VII Freedom Cross

== Honours ==
- Member of the Royal Swedish Academy of War Sciences (1948)

Military offices
Preceded by None	Surgeon-in-Chief of the Swedish Army; 1943–1953	Succeeded by Eugén Strömberg
