= Surgeon-in-Chief of the Swedish Navy =

Historical head of the Swedish Naval Medical Officers' Corps

The Surgeon-in-Chief of the Swedish Navy (Note: Marinöverläkare is also translated as Surgeon-in-Chief of the [Swedish] Naval Forces; (Br) the Director of the [Swedish] Naval Medical Service; (US) Surgeon General, Royal [Swedish] Navy or Surgeon Admiral of the Navy.) (Swedish: marinöverläkaren, MÖL) was from 1902 to 1969 the senior-most officer and head of the Swedish Naval Medical Officers' Corps, responsible for naval surgeons and the overall medical care in the Swedish Navy and the Swedish Coastal Artillery. The Surgeon-in-Chief was posted to the Naval Staff and reported to the Chief of the Navy.

== History ==
The post of Surgeon-in-Chief of the Swedish Navy was created in connection with the Swedish Naval Medical Officers' Corps' receiving its organization established by a decision of the Riksdag of 1902. The number of staff positions in the corps was then determined to be 39 with the following distribution in ranks, namely 2 first naval surgeons, 7 naval surgeons of the 1st class, 20 naval surgeons of 2nd class, 10 naval surgeons fellows. A first naval surgeon would, on appointment, handle the position as Surgeon-in-Chief and head of the corps. First naval surgeons and naval surgeons of the 1st class were required to serve all year round; naval surgeons of the 2nd class and naval surgeon fellows, on the other hand, only a certain part of the year. In connection with the reorganization of the Royal Swedish Naval Materiel Administration in accordance with the decision of the Riksdag of 1909, the Surgeon-in-Chief position was established as a special position in active service. The Surgeon-in-Chief was head of the corps and its reserve as well as head of the Royal Swedish Naval Materiel Administration's Sanitation Department. He was to assist the National Swedish Board of Health in dealing with matters concerning the health and medical care in the Swedish Navy and in the Swedish Coastal Artillery, with the right to participate in the deliberations of the Board of Directors on these questions. Surgeon-in-Chief was also the first naval surgeon at Stockholm naval station.

The 1937 instructions for the Chief of the Navy and his subordinate bodies for the exercise of the naval military command (SFS 1937:679) stipulated, among other things, that the Surgeon-in-Chief of the Swedish Navy, under the Chief of the Navy, would be an inspector for health care in the navy and in such capacity deal with matters pertaining to this service, insofar as the current regulations concerning the Royal Swedish Naval Materiel Administration or the National Swedish Board of Health did not cause otherwise. He would also be the head of the Swedish Naval Medical Officers' Corps. In cases that could be of significance to the general health and medical care in the country, it was incumbent on him, depending on the nature of the case, to report to or consult with the National Swedish Board of Health. He was to report to the National Swedish Board of Health when one of the Swedish Naval Medical Officers' Corps' staff resigned from the service for reasons other than dismissal. In his office, complete registers would be carried over the staff. He had the right, in accordance with current regulations, to decide matters that fell within the field of medicine. Cases concerning the medical practice of naval surgeons belonged to the National Swedish Board of Health. Regarding the Surgeon-in-Chief of the Swedish Navy's participation in the deliberations of the National Swedish Medical Services Board (Sjukvårdsstyrelsen) and the National Swedish Board of Health, it applied if it was specifically stipulated. With regard to participation in the National Swedish Board of Health's deliberations, it was stipulated by gracious letter on 2 March 1906, that the Surgeon-in-Chief was entitled, when matters concerning the navy and coastal artillery were with the National Swedish Board of Health, to participate in the board's deliberations and have his opinion recorded in the protocols.

The inspection activities within the navy's healthcare were the task of the Surgeon-in-Chief of the Swedish Navy. The duties of the Surgeon-in-Chief were — with some exceptions — of a dual nature and included both a position as a service branch inspector and command of the appropriate administrative corps. As a service branch inspector, he was responsible for the condition of the service in various respects, such as the hygienic conditions, healthcare in general and the professional activities. As administrative corps chief, the Surgeon-in-Chief had to handle any promotion, command, etc. matters concerning the Swedish Naval Medical Officers' Corps. In the navy, matters concerning training in medical service was handled under the Chief of the Navy by the Surgeon-in-Chief in consultation with the Naval Staff's Education Department and the Inspector of the Coastal Artillery. The training responsibilities of the Surgeon-in-Chief also included inspections in professional terms of regionally and locally conducted training of both civilian and military personnel.

On 1 July 1969, the command of the military medical service was reorganized and the Surgeon-in-Chief of the Swedish Navy as an institution ceased to be a name but for the benefit only on 1 September 1969 according to the Medical Board of the Swedish Armed Forces's authorization though the King in Council. The new organization meant that Surgeon-in-Chief's duties as administrative corps chief were transferred to the newly established "Chief of the Medical Board of the Swedish Armed Forces", that matters concerning the service of conscript surgeons were transferred to the Enrollment Administration of the Swedish Armed Forces (Värnpliktsverket) and that matters concerning the Surgeon-in-Chief were otherwise divided into the newly established Marinstabsläkaren ("Naval Staff Doctor") equated with department head included in Section 2 of the Naval Staff.

== Surgeons-in-Chief ==
No.	Portrait	Name	Took office	Left office	Time in office	Chief of the Navy	Ref.
-	Karl Rudberg, M.D.	Karl Rudberg, M.D. (1852–1923); Acting	1902	1917	6–7 years	-	(Note: Rudberg served as Acting Surgeon-in-Chief of the Swedish Navy from 1902 to 1909, then as Surgeon-in-Chief of the Swedish Navy from 1909 to 1917. However, he was Chief of the Swedish Naval Medical Officers’ Corps from 1902 to 1917.)
1	Karl Rudberg, M.D.	Karl Rudberg, M.D. (1852–1923)	1909	1917	7–8 years	-	
2	Gunnar Nilson, M.D.	Gunnar Nilson, M.D. (1872–1951)	1 February 1917	30 September 1937	20 years, 241 days	Charles de Champs	
3	Herbert Westermark, M.D.	Herbert Westermark, M.D. (1891–1981)	1937	1956	18–19 years	Charles de Champs; Fabian Tamm; Helge Strömbäck; Stig H:son Ericson	
4	Lars Troell, M.D.	Lars Troell, M.D. (1916–1998)	1956	1969	12–13 years	Stig H:son Ericson; Åke Lindemalm	

== See also ==
- Surgeon-in-Chief of the Swedish Air Force
- Surgeon-in-Chief of the Swedish Army
- Surgeon-General of the Swedish Armed Forces
