= Bo Rybeck =

Swedish physician and researcher (1935–2019)

Bo Rybeck (21 January 1935 – 16 December 2019) was a Swedish physician and researcher. He served as Surgeon-General of the Swedish Armed Forces (1981–1985) and as Director-General of the Swedish National Defence Research Institute (1985–1994).

== Early life ==
Rybeck was born on 21 January 1935 in Hedvig Eleonora Parish, Stockholm, Sweden, the son of Ebbe Rybeck, an auditor, and his wife Anna-Lisa (née Tidlund).

== Career ==
Rybeck received a Licentiate of Medical Science (Medicine licentiatexamen) degree in Stockholm in 1960 and then worked as an assistant physician (underläkare) at Norrbackainstitutet in Stockholm from 1960 to 1962 and then at the orthopedic clinic at Uppsala University Hospital from 1962 to 1964. Rybeck served as a staff doctor (stabsläkare) in Stockholm Coastal Artillery Defence (Stockholms kustartilleriförsvar, SK) from 1964 to 1967 and in the Coastal Fleet from 1967 to 1969. Rybeck then served as a doctor in the Upper Norrland Military District from 1969 to 1970 and as a Naval Staff doctor in Stockholm from 1970 to 1975.

He received a Doctor of Medicine degree in Gothenburg in 1974 and worked as a Docent in military medicine and disaster medicine at the University of Gothenburg in 1975. Rybeck then served as chief defence physician (försvarsöverläkare) from 1975 to 1976, as an Army Staff doctor from 1976 to 1979 as well as acting Surgeon-General of the Swedish Armed Forces from 1979 to 1980. Rybeck then served as Surgeon-General of the Swedish Armed Forces and head of the Medical Corps of the Swedish Armed Forces from 1981 to 1985 and as Director-General of the Swedish National Defence Research Institute from 1985 to 1994. From 1994 to 1995, Rybeck was the director general of the National Board for Strategic Defence Research (NSF).

Member of the Central Committee of the Swedish Society of Military Medical Officers (Svenska Militärläkareföreningen) from 1969 to 1979, secretary of the Disaster Medicine Organizing Committee of the Defence Medical Research Delegation from 1971 to 1974, medical delegate in Pakistan for the Red Cross in 1972, member of the delegation for the development of international law rules on humanity in war from 1974, medical expert at the Ministry for Foreign Affairs at the diplomatic conference on the laws of war in Geneva from 1973 to 1976, chairman of the UN expert meeting in Geneva on disarmament negotiations on bacteriological weapons in 1987, Nämnden för strategisk försvarsforskning ("Board for Strategic Defense Research") from 1994 to 1995. Rybeck was a member of the board of Bofors AB from 1995 to 1997. He was also part owner of the research company, Hibernon AB that performed brain research.

== Personal life ==
In 1958, Rybeck married Karin Lindahl (born 1932), the daughter of dentist Karl-Axel Lindahl and Ingrid (née Alderin). He had three daughters; Johanna, Susanne and Anna-Karin.

== Death ==
Rybeck died on 16 December 2019. The funeral service was held on 23 January 2020 in Grödinge Church in Botkyrka Municipality.

== Awards, decorations and honours ==
=== Awards and decorations ===
- Michael DeBakey International Military Surgeons Award, USA (1986)
- Title of Professor (Swedish: Professors namn) (1993)
- Commander of the Ordre national du Mérite, France (1994)

=== Honours ===
- Member of the Royal Swedish Society of Naval Sciences (1971)
- Member of the Royal Swedish Academy of War Sciences (1981)
- Member of the American Association for the Surgery of Trauma (1984)
- Honorary doctor of the Russian Military Medical Academy, Saint Petersburg (1997)

Military offices
Preceded by Åke Lindgren	Surgeon-General of the Swedish Armed Forces; 1981–1985	Succeeded by Björn Zetterström
Government offices
Preceded by Björn Zetterström	Director-General of the National Defence Research Institute; 1985–1994	Succeeded by Bengt Anderberg
