= Surgeon-in-Chief of the Swedish Army =

The Surgeon-in-Chief of the Swedish Army (Swedish: arméöverläkaren) was from 1943 to 1969 the senior-most officer and head of the Swedish Army Medical Corps.

== History ==
The decision to establish a Surgeon-in-Chief of the Swedish Army and inspector of the army's healthcare system was made by the Riksdag of 1942. The position was formally established on 1 October 1943 and he was head of the Swedish Army Medical Corps. Subordinate to him in the Swedish Army Medical Corps were 8 field surgeons, 48 regimental surgeons and 47 battalion surgeons. A field surgeon or regimental surgeon in an active state was authorized for the position of Surgeon-in-Chief of the Swedish Army.

The inspection activities within the army's healthcare were the task of the Surgeon-in-Chief of the Swedish Army. The duties of the Surgeon-in-Chief were — with some exceptions — of a dual nature and included both a position as a service branch inspector and command of the appropriate administrative corps. For the Surgeon-in-Chief of the Swedish Army, in addition to the tasks just mentioned, he was head of the Army Inspectorate's (Arméinspektionen) Medical Department. As head of the Army Inspectorate's Medical Department, the Surgeon-in-Chief had to prepare matters concerning such training of personnel intended for health care, which was not military training; to inspect said training; to submit to the Inspector of the Swedish Army Service Troops in respect of military logistics, ordnance and quartermaster troops and to the army inspector in respect of other types of troops proposals for the measures which, with regard to vocational training, etc., are called for; and to keep special registers of certain personnel in accordance with what is specifically stipulated.

In 1949, in connection with a reorganization of the Army Staff, the Army Inspectorate ceased and thereafter the Surgeon-in-Chief was part of the Army Staff. From 1 July 1969, the Surgeon-in-Chief of the Swedish Army was part of the Medical Board of the Swedish Armed Forces as head of the Medical Corps Office (Medicinalkårsexpeditionen).

== Surgeons-in-Chief ==
No.	Portrait	Name	Took office	Left office	Time in office	Chief of the Army	Ref.
1	Sigurd Kihlstedt, L.Med.	Sigurd Kihlstedt, L.Med. (1897–1953)	1943	1953	9–10 years	Ivar Holmquist; Archibald Douglas; Carl August Ehrensvärd	
-	Eugén Strömberg, M.D.	Colonel; Eugén Strömberg, M.D. (1895–1971); Acting	1949	1953	3–4 years	Carl August Ehrensvärd	
3	Eugén Strömberg, M.D.	Colonel; Eugén Strömberg, M.D. (1895–1971)	1953	1960	6–7 years	Carl August Ehrensvärd; Thord Bonde	
4	Gustav Hesselblad, L.Med.	Gustav Hesselblad, L.Med. (1906–1989)	1960	1971	10–11 years	Thord Bonde; Curt Göransson	

== See also ==
- Surgeon-in-Chief of the Swedish Air Force
- Surgeon-in-Chief of the Swedish Navy
- Surgeon-General of the Swedish Armed Forces
