= Kohlstedt =

Kohlstedt is a surname. Notable people with the surname include:

- Martin Kohlstedt (born 1988), German composer, pianist, and record producer
- Sally Gregory Kohlstedt (born 1943), American historian of science

== See also ==
- Kihlstedt
