= Swedish Army Medical Corps =

Former administrative corps for military surgeons of the Swedish Army (1806-1969)

- Fältläkarkåren
- Active: 1806–1969
- Country: Sweden
- Allegiance: Swedish Armed Forces
- Branch: Swedish Army
- Type: Medical corps
- Role: Military medicine
- Size: c. 100–260 people

Commanders
- Notable commanders: Fritz Bauer; Gustav Hesselblad

The Swedish Army Medical Corps (Swedish: Fältläkarkåren, Flk) was from 1806 to 1969 an administrative corps of the Swedish Army, consisting of military surgeons. In 1969 the corps was amalgamated into the Medical Corps of the Swedish Armed Forces.

== History ==
=== 16th century to 18th century ===
Quite late, actual physicians were employed in Sweden by the armed forces, because even in Gustav Vasa's time there were no scientifically trained physicians in the country. The only medical care available at that time was provided by so-called bardskärare (barbers), and in 1556 Gustav I prescribed that barbers should be appointed in the fähnlein's (200–500 men). By the regulations of 1571, the barbers was obliged to provide the army and navy with the required number of feldshers in the event of mobilization and wars. But since no special regulations on any kind of qualification existed, this also explains why the Swedish Army's medical care for such a long time and to such an extent was handled by registered or immigrated more or less unskilled German feldshers. Probably anyone who was somewhat knowledgeable in the profession of bandage and dressing could gain employment as a regimental or company barber. It was not until 1669 that it was decided that they would be examined like other surgeons before admission. That this examination, however, left much to be desired, appears from a letters patent from 1685, in which it is stated:

då Vi förnimme, att barberareämbetet icke härtilldags varit vandt att med samma vikt och sorgfällighet examinera de mästare, som antagas vid vår milis till lands och vatten, som dem hvilka sig i Stockholm nedersätta, hvilket Oss sällsamt förekommer, likasom vore det mindre angeläget att välja och utse välerfarna kirurger för så många tusende Våra brafva officerare och redliga krigsmän, som våga lif och blod för fäderneslandet - - - så befalle Vi, att hädanefter skall brukas samma stränghet och maner i förhören och profven med alla de barberare, som skola antagas vid milisen till lands och vatten, som öfligt är med de andra

— Letters patent of 1685
Translation:

when we perceive that the barber's office has not at this time been accustomed to examine with the same weight and care the masters who are admitted to our militia to land and water, as those who settle in Stockholm, which occurs to us strangely, just as it would be less important to choose and appoint experienced surgeons for so many thousands of our brave officers and honest warriors, who dare life and blood for the fatherland - - - so we commanded that henceforth the same severity and manners should be used in the interrogations and rehearsals with all the barbers who are to be admitted by the militia to land and water, who are common with the others

— Letters patent of 1685

The following year, the barber's office under the name Societas chirurgica received its first royal regulations with the obligation to train feldshers to the needs of the country. During Charles XII's wars, however, it proved impossible for the surgical society to provide the army with the required number of feldshers, why even the resort was resorted to sending students directly to undergo their lessons in the school of war and graduate before a collegium chirurgicum castrense, whose first president became the king's physician Samuel Skragge. But despite this, the supply remained insufficient. Even in qualitative terms, the military medical service continued to be very deficient despite all the repeated tightening of regulations. The reasons were many, not least of an economic and social nature. Wages were small, and in his subordination relations, for example, the company barber was equated with the community, whose uniform he wore. Throughout the 18th century, conditions remained largely unchanged. Sweden's military history from this time carefully shows the unfortunate consequences of the neglected health care in the army and navy. The military companies were often paralyzed by the great morbidity, and the casualties by the enemy's weapons during the Finnish wars in the 18th century constituted a vanishing insignificance against the casualties by diseases. And little or nothing was done to help the shortage of capable military surgeons. It is true that one or more scientifically trained surgeon were sometimes employed at the field hospitals, but since these usually left the military service after the end of the war, the improvements they made were of a temporary nature.

=== 19th century ===
By letters patent of 6 August 1806, however, the Swedish military medical service underwent one of the most important and radical changes, when it was stipulated that all surgeons employed in the army in peace and war would constitute a special establishment, militarily organized and subordinate under its own, only before the king responsible chief; he would be a member of both the War College and the Collegium medicum (National Swedish Board of Health). The more detailed regulatory provisions with stricter requirements for education and more were issued in 1808 during the ongoing Finnish-Russian war, which the new organization unfortunately did not have time to implement. At that time, however, no army in Europe owned a sanitation organization. For a long time, however, this organization did not become permanent. Under the fresh impression of the said war, proposals were made at the Riksdag in 1810 for strong measures to counteract the noted errors in the field administration. The consequences were, among other things, the establishment of Karolinska Institute as an educational institution for the formation of military surgeons, the construction of the General Garrison Hospital (Allmänna garnisonssjukhuset) in Stockholm and the Swedish Army Medical Corps' placement under Collegium medicum. New regulations were issued in 1812, which abolished the military organization of the corps, and its members were placed without their own chief both under the said college and under the authority of the relevant military commander. The military surgeons thus found themselves in a strange position. If one excludes those serving in the same troop unit, they became without any connection with each other. Admittedly, they belonged to the name of a corps, which, in the absence of a chief, was really just a collective term for the surgeons employed by the army.

=== 1900–1969 ===
Subsequently, a large number of committees, which had dealt with the issue of the organization of military health care, had spoken out against such an arrangement, including in 1905, which was appointed to prepare proposals for changes in the organization of the army's central administrative authority. Numerous partial improvements during the early 20th century had been made for the initial transformation of the Swedish Army Medical Corps and the sanitation system. At the Riksdag of 1907, it was decided to reorganize the army's central administrative authority and thus also to establish a Medical Board. In this way, the top management of health care in the Land Defense (Lantförsvaret) and the command of the surgeons employed by the same had been arranged in a more uniform manner. The chief army surgeon, who had previously been a member of the National Swedish Board of Health, now became head of the said health care board.

In 1908, in addition to the chief army surgeon (with the rank of major general), the Swedish Army Medical Corps consisted of 203 members in active service, namely: 1 surgeon (with the rank of lieutenant colonel), rapporteur for sanitary affairs in the Medical Board, 52 regimental surgeons, 90 battalion surgeons and 60 field surgeon students (fältläkarstipendiater); the Army Medical Corps also included 6 assistant surgeons at the General Garrison Hospital in Stockholm. The regimental surgeons (with the rank of major), generally one in each regiment and corps, were responsible for the health care there. Within each army division, a regimental surgeon was appointed to, as a division surgeon (with the rank of lieutenant colonel) before the army division commander, be the rapporteur on matters concerning the medical and veterinary services within the division, to carry out inspections, etc. Battalion surgeons, 2 classes with higher and lower salaries and the rank of captain and lieutenant, generally performed the daily duty (medical care, etc.). A battalion surgeon with the salary of an older battalion surgeons served as an assistant in the National Board of Health. Field surgeon students, 2 classes with different salaries and the rank of lieutenant and underlöjtnant, were commanded for duty, when the need arose. The Army Medical Corps reserve consisted partly of military surgeons who, after reaching retirement age, retired from service with a pension, partly of military surgeons who before reaching retirement age retired from service, and partly of Bachelor of Medical Sciences degree conscripts and Licentiate of Medicine degree conscripts who had completed conscription recruitment school; the staff was obliged to serve even in peacetime. The regular military surgeons were appointed by the king according to a proposal made by the National Swedish Board of Health and the Army Medical Board; students and assistant surgeons were appointed by the latter authorities.

In the field, the regular medical staff was strengthened with extra surgeons, as far as the availability allowed. The field surgery service was organized partly in the battlefield – at the troop units and the staging area service (fältetappväsendet) – and partly in the home district. The surgeons referred to in the mobilization plans for this purpose serve at the various field formations. The army surgeons, who was in charge of health care in its entirety, served at the headquarters; the division surgeons in the army division quarters, the regimental and battalion surgeons at the troop units, the medical companies and the field hospitals; furthermore, in the field staging area service, special staging area surgeons in the headquarters, at the staging area hospitals, the staging area medical cadres, in the sick camps, in medical transport by rail and waterway and more; and finally in the home district deputy military surgeons of various degrees.

From 1 January 1915, the titles surgeon-general (generalfältläkare) were introduced instead of chief army surgeon (överfältläkare), chief army surgeon instead of field surgeon (fältläkare) and field surgeon instead of division surgeon (fördelningsläkare). In the early 1920s, the corps (excluding the reserve) consisted of 1 surgeon-general (major general), 1 chief army surgeon (colonel and lieutenant colonel, respectively), 6 field surgeons (lieutenant colonel), 49 regimental surgeons (majors), 55 battalion surgeons at troop units, hospitals and more (captain), 44 battalion surgeons at the Army Medical Corps (captain, respectively lieutenant) and 24 field surgeon students (fältläkarstipendiater) (lieutenant).

In 1969, the Swedish Army Medical Corps was amalgamated with the Swedish Naval Medical Officers’ Corps and the Swedish Army Veterinary Corps, which formed the Medical Corps of the Swedish Armed Forces.

== Uniforms 1812–1905 ==
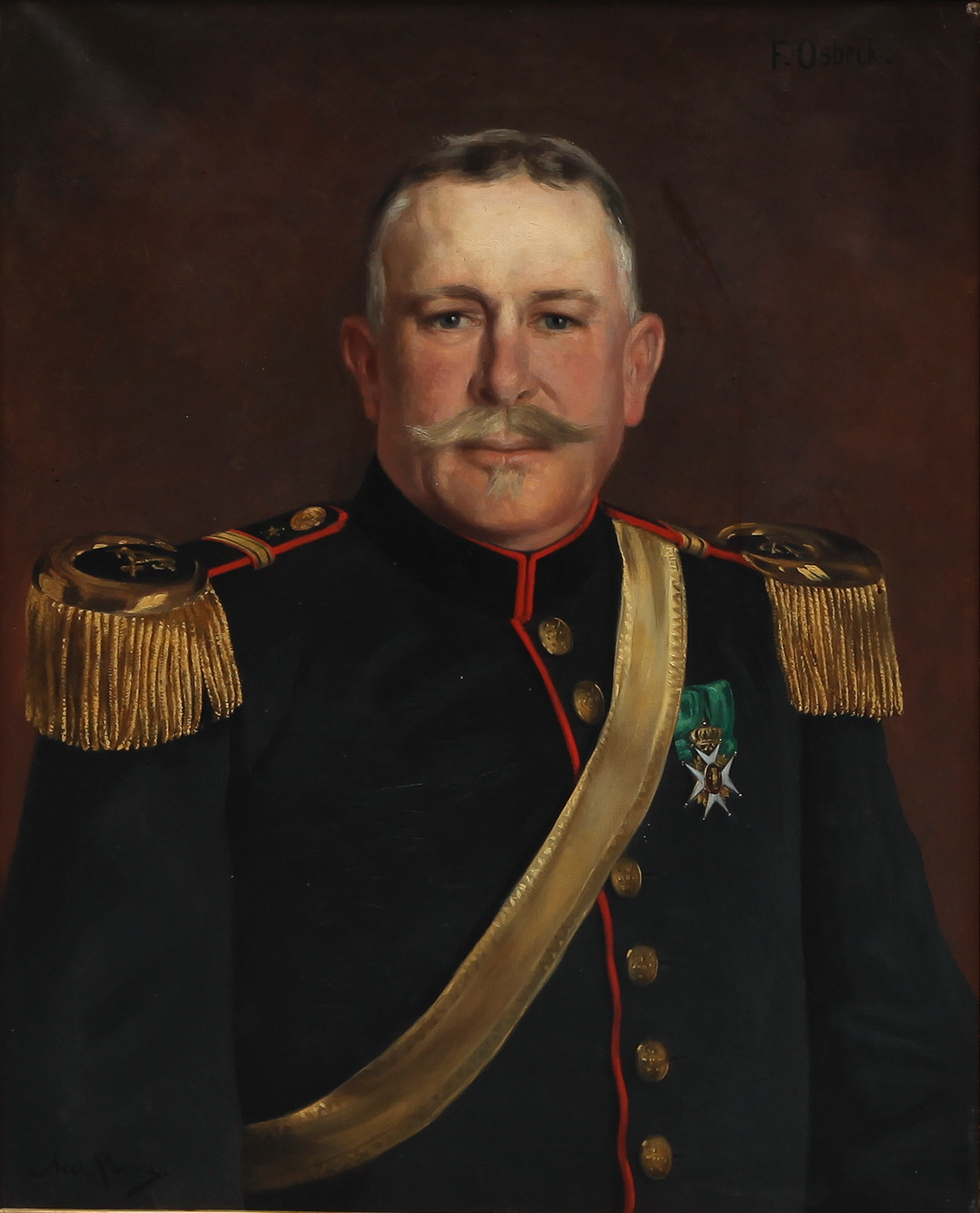
Major Fritz Osbeck (1849–1914) dressed in uniform for a surgeon in the Swedish Army Medical Corps.

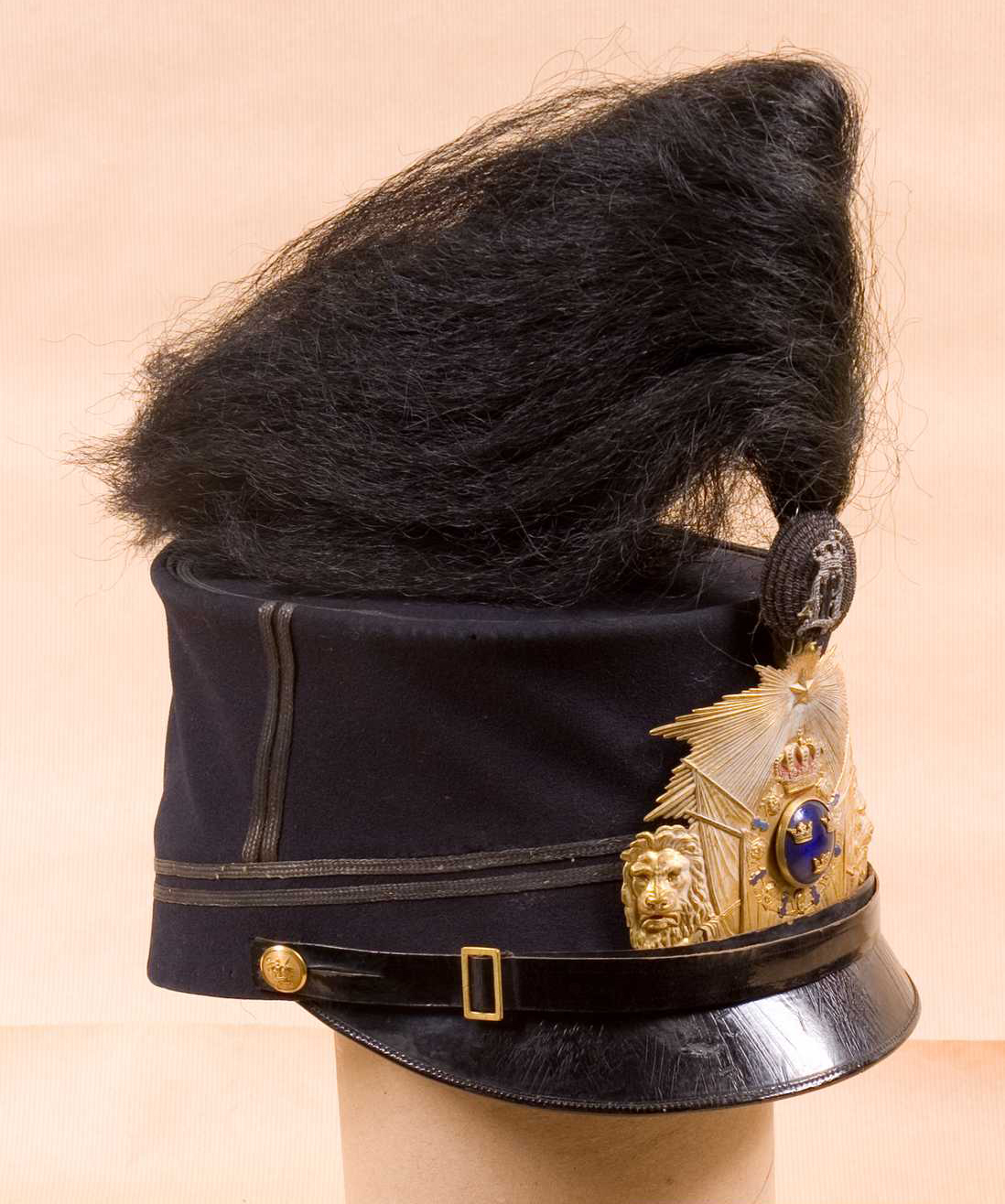
Cap m/1865 for a lieutenant in the Swedish Army Medical Corps with cap plate and plume.

=== Miscellaneous ===
In 1806 a dark blue tunic with turned up tails and two rows of buttons on the chest. In 1845 a tunic of dark blue broadcloth, single breasted with eight buttons, open and slanted Prussian collar with a red flap on each side, red piping in the front from the collar and all the way down, around the cuffs and on the pocket flaps. Epaulettes of earlier model were worn. The trousers were of dark blue broadcloth with a red piping along the outer seam. For summer use, trousers of linen or other white fabric were used. In 1886 military surgeons got tunic m/1886 with black lining, collar and cuffs of black velvet and with three blind button holes on each cuff. Red piping along the front edge of the tunic, on the Prussian collar and around the cuffs. Epaulette straps were of golden braid and lined with red cloth. Alternatively a dark blue coat m/1888, double breasted with five buttons in each row, no cuffs and with pleated gilded shoulder straps or surtout m/1829–1854, double breasted with eight buttons in each row could be worn. Trousers m/1872 had red piping in the outer seams. Greatcoat m/1886 was of grey broadcloth. Later greatcout m/04 of greybrown-green broadcloth and with grey lining might be worn. Cap m/1865–1899 with cockade and cap button m/1865 could at parade be furnished with pom-pom and a drooping plume m/1865 of black horse hair.

=== Arms and strappings ===
Side weapons were sabre circa 1859 and later m/1899 for officer. Cartouche of black leather was carried in a strap of yellow hide over left shoulder.

== Commanding officers ==
The chief of the Swedish Army Medical Corps until 1943 was the Surgeon-General of the Swedish Armed Forces and from 1943 to 1969 the Surgeon-in-Chief of the Swedish Army.

=== Surgeons-General of the Swedish Armed Forces ===
- 1915–1917: Anton Nettelblad
- 1917–1930: Fritz Bauer
- 1930–1939: Richard Erhardt
- 1939–1943: David Lindsjö (acting)
- 1943–1943: Oskar Nordlander

=== Surgeons-in-Chief of the Swedish Army ===
- 1943–1953: Sigurd Kihlstedt
- 1949–1953: Eugén Strömberg (acting)
- 1953–1960: Eugén Strömberg
- 1960–1971: Gustav Hesselblad
