= Gunnar Krantz (veterinarian) =

Swedish veterinarian (1911–2003)

- Born: Gunnar Teodor Krantz; 17 February 1911; Stockholm, Sweden
- Died: 4 March 2003 (aged 92); Stockholm, Sweden
- Occupation: Veterinarian
- Spouse: Anna Lisa Julin (m. 1937)
- Children: 3

Gunnar Teodor Krantz (17 February 1911 – 4 March 2003) was a Swedish veterinarian. He served as the Veterinary Surgeon-in-Chief and head of the Swedish Army Veterinary Corps from 1957 to 1969 and as Director of the Swedish Armed Forces Veterinarian Service from 1969 to 1976.

== Early life ==
Krantz was born on 17 February 1911 in Stockholm, Sweden, the son of Carl Teodor Krantz and his wife Ester (née Kjellin). He passed studentexamen in 1930, obtained his bachelor's degree in veterinary medicine in 1933, and became a licensed veterinarian in 1937.

== Career ==
Krantz began his career as an assistant at the Department of Pathological Anatomy at the Royal Veterinary College of Sweden (Veterinärhögskolan) in 1937. He became battalion veterinary officer in the Life Regiment of Horse in 1939. He served in the Army Command in 1941, as a battalion veterinary officer in the Veterinary Department of the Army Inspectorate (Arméinspektionen) in 1943, as a regimental veterinary officer in the Svea Artillery Regiment in 1944, and as a regimental veterinary officer in the Veterinary Department of the Army Inspectorate in 1944. Krantz attended the Swedish National Defence College in 1953 and served in the Medical Board of the Swedish Armed Forces in 1955. He served as an army veterinary surgeon in the staff of the IV Military District in 1957.

Krantz served as Veterinary Surgeon-in-Chief and head of the Swedish Army Veterinary Corps from 1957 to 1969. In 1969, the veterinary medical activities were transferred from the Army Staff to the Medical Board of the Swedish Armed Forces. From the same year, he became the Director of the Swedish Armed Forces Veterinarian Service (försvarsöverveterinär) in the Veterinary Section of the Health Care Office at the Medical Board of the Swedish Armed Forces. He served in this position until 1976.

Krantz served as secretary and treasurer of the Swedish Veterinary Society (Sveriges veterinärförbund) from 1942 to 1957. He was the chairman of the Swedish Women's Auxiliary Veterinary Corps (Svenska Blå Stjärnan) until April 1962 when he was succeeded by Inga-Lisa Ekstedt. He was the chairman of the Swedish Federation of Animal Welfare Associations (Sveriges djurskyddsföreningars riksförbund) from 1977 to 1985.

== Personal life ==
On 5 September 1937, Krantz married Anna Lisa Julin (1909–2003), the daughter of postmaster Teodor Julin and Elma (née Lindeberg), in Vårdinge Church south of Södertälje, Stockholm County. They had three children: Birgitta (1940–2002), Bengt (born 1942), and Cecilia (born 1947).

== Death ==
Krantz died on 4 March 2003. The funeral service was held on 11 April 2003 at Bromma Church in Stockholm. He was interred on 6 May 2003 at Bromma Cemetery.

== Awards and decorations ==
=== Swedish ===
- (Sweden) Commander 1st Class of the Order of the Polar Star (6 June 1969)
- (Sweden) Commander of the Order of the Polar Star (6 June 1961)
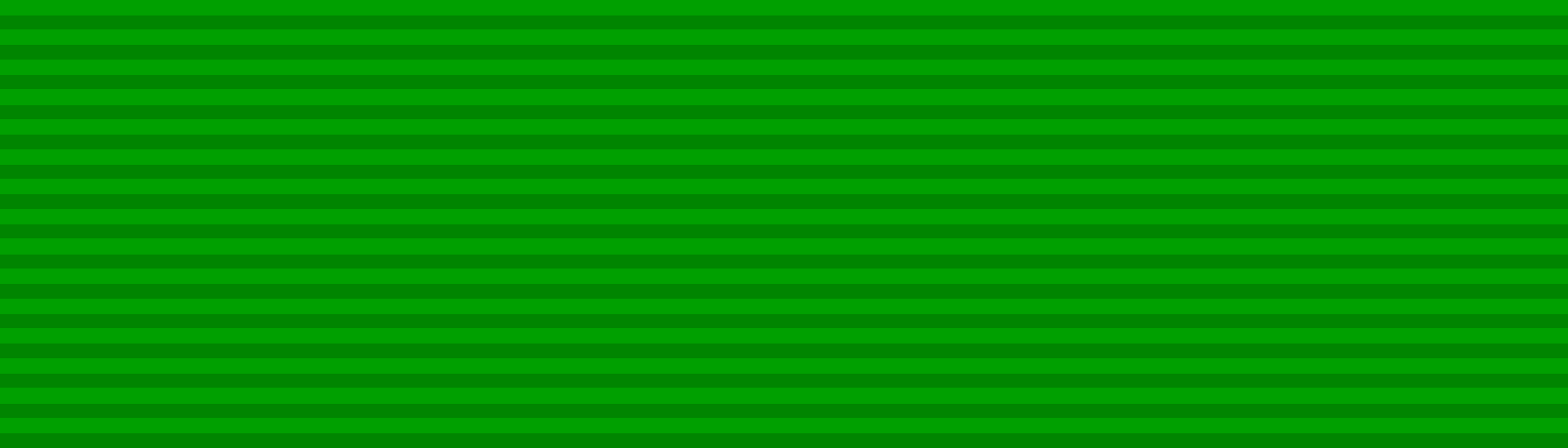
- (Sweden) Knight of the Order of Vasa (1954)
- (Sweden) Swedish Women's Auxiliary Veterinary Corps Medal of Merit in gold (Svenska Blå Stjärnans förtjänstmedalj i guld) (April 1963)
- (Sweden) Swedish Women's Auxiliary Veterinary Corps Medal of Merit in silver (Svenska Blå Stjärnans förtjänstmedalj i silver) (26 May 1961)
- (Sweden) Djurvännernas förening's gold medal (1982)
- (Sweden) Swedish Society for the Protection of Animals (Svenska Djurskyddsföreningen) Medal of Merit (May 1979)

=== Foreign ===
- (Finland) 4th Class of the Order of the Cross of Liberty with sword
- (Finland) Finnish War Commemorative Medal

== Honours ==
- Member of the Royal Swedish Academy of War Sciences (1961)

== Bibliography ==
- Krantz, Gunnar T. (1937). Om s. k. hudtuberkulos hos nötkreatur [In regards to bovine cutaneous tuberculosis]. Meddelande / Sällskapet för veterinärmedicinsk forskning, 99-1768294-5; 7 (in Swedish). Uppsala. SELIBR 2129874.
- Krantz, Gunnar T. (1964). Det militära veterinärväsendet: uppgifter, funktion och utveckling från och med andra världskriget [The military veterinary service: tasks, function, and development from the Second World War onwards]. Meddelande från Rådet för veterinärhistoria och biografisk forskning, 3614474; 21 (in Swedish). Stockholm. SELIBR 9892590.
- Krantz, Gunnar T. (1974). Det tyska militärveterinärväsendet under andra världskriget [The German military veterinary service during the Second World War] (in Swedish). Stockholm. SELIBR 8820893.
- Krantz, Gunnar T. (1990). Hästminne - återblick på en svunnen veterinärverksamhet [Horse Memory - Reflection on a Past Veterinary Practice]. Meddelande från Rådet för veterinärhistoria och biografisk forskning, 3614474; 103 (in Swedish). [s.l.] SELIBR 9892577.
- Krantz, Gunnar T. (1990). "Krigskirurgiska studier": svenska veterinärer i Finland under fortsättningskriget [Surgical Studies in Wartime": Swedish Veterinarians in Finland during the Continuation War]. Meddelande från Rådet för veterinärhistoria och biografisk forskning, 3614474; 104 (in Swedish). [s.l.] SELIBR 9879228.

Military offices
Preceded by Erik Liljefors	Veterinary Surgeon-in-Chief of the Swedish Army; 1957–1969	Succeeded by None
Preceded by None	Director of the Swedish Armed Forces Veterinarian Service; 1969–1976	Succeeded by Viktor Hultsved
