= Ann-Marie Göransson =

- Born: Inger Ann-Marie Göransson; 6 January 1947 (age 79); Malmö, Sweden
- Military career
- Allegiance: Sweden
- Service years: 1978–2004
- Rank: Major General
- Commands: Surgeon-General of the Swedish Armed Forces
- Conflicts: Lebanese Civil War (UNIFIL)

Major General Inger Ann-Marie Göransson (born 6 January 1947) was the first female general in the Swedish Armed Forces. She served as the Surgeon-General of the Swedish Armed Forces from 1997 to 2004.

== Early life and education ==
Göransson was born on 6 January 1947 in Malmö, Sweden, the daughter of Gustav Göransson, a carpenter, and his wife Ida (née Larsson). Göransson worked as a temp in the surgical clinic at Malmö General Hospital and in the surgical, medical, anesthesia, gynecological clinics at Södertälje Hospital from 1971 to 1974. She graduated from Lund University in 1972 with a Licentiate of Medical Science (Medicine licentiatexamen) degree.

== Career ==
Göransson worked in the surgical clinic at Huddinge Hospital from 1974 to 1980. In 1977 she acquired specialized expertise in general surgery, in 1978 she was employed by the Swedish Armed Forces and in 1980 she finish her doctoral dissertation on biliary tract surgery at the Karolinska Institute which gave her a Doctor of Medicine degree.

In 1980 she served as surgeon at the Swedish field hospital in Lebanon, which was part of the Swedish UN operation within the United Nations Interim Force in Lebanon (UNIFIL). In 1980 she was also appointed staff doctor in the Army Staff. In 1981, she was appointed lieutenant colonel and senior defense medical officer (försvarsöverläkare). In the mid-1980s, she was invited to the United States Army for two years working as a teacher in field surgery, and building a laboratory in Washington for wound ballistics research. Göransson attended the Swedish National Defence College in 1984. She then served as medical officer in the Upper Norrland Military District from 1985 to 1990. She was promoted to colonel in 1986. In 1989 she served again in Lebanon, this time as head of the entire Swedish medical operation there. Göransson served in the Defence Staff from 1990.

Göransson was responsible for planning and launching the Swedish field hospitals in Saudi Arabia during the Gulf War and in Somalia in 1993. During her time in the Defence Staff, she was responsible for the coordination of all research within the Swedish Armed Forces, i.e. also outside the medical field. Among other things, the development of a new radar and research into the effects of new weapons systems. In the mid-1990s, Göransson served in the Ministry of Defence with demining issues. On 1 July 1997, she took office as the Surgeon-General of the Swedish Armed Forces.

As Surgeon-General, she led a staff of about 20 people, including doctors, nurses, pharmacists and veterinarians at the Swedish Armed Forces Headquarters in Stockholm. In addition, she was the head of the doctors working at defense facilities around the country. Her responsibilities also included international defense medical commitments, such as Swedish field hospitals, as well as development and research. Göransson left the position as Surgeon-General on 31 December 2004 after a turbulent time, when among other things she was reported to the Swedish Work Environment Authority by several doctors in the Swedish Armed Forces. On 1 May 2004, Göransson assumed the position of Representative for the Swedish National Armaments Director (NAD) at the Swedish EU representation in Brussels, where she was responsible, among other things, for the Swedish participation in the establishment of an EU authority for defense capacity development, research, procurement and defense equipment cooperation.

== Dates of rank ==
- 19?? – Second lieutenant
- 19?? – Lieutenant
- 19?? – Captain
- 19?? – Major
- 1981 – Lieutenant colonel
- 1986 – Colonel
- 19?? – Senior colonel
- 1997 – Major general

Military offices
Preceded by Björn Zetterström	Surgeon-General of the Swedish Armed Forces; 1997–2004	Succeeded by Sture E. Andersson
