= Medal for Noble Deeds (Sweden) =

- Awarded for: Noble deeds
- Country: Sweden
- Presented by: Government of Sweden
- First award: 1832
- Ribbon bar
- Related: Sui memores alios fecere merendo

The Medal for Noble Deeds (Swedish: För berömliga gärningar, GM/SMbg) is a Swedish medal intended to honour personal courage in a civilian context. It is used to honour not only the noble deed of lifesaving but also courage and presence of mind. Since its inception in 1832, the medal has been awarded in gold in two sizes and in silver in one size.

== History ==
Gustav III approved the medal Illis quorum meruere labores, in 1785, but there is no information to indicate that it was awarded until 1787. After Gustav III's death, no awards were given. Gustav IV Adolf took the medal into use in 1798 and it was used relatively extensively during the 19th century. The medal was used for various contributions and for people from large parts of society. Sui memores alios fecere merendo ("To those who affirm their memory in others by doing good deeds") was established in 1805 by Gustaf IV Adolf intended to honor efforts for public benefit activities. It then became a reward for saving human lives.

In 1832, Charles XIV John decided that the medals would be issued in Swedish in the future, but that the variants in Latin would be retained for special cases. This meant that a certain confusion took place between the medals for a number of years. In the 1860s, Illis quorum regained its status as an award for Swedish citizens for civic merit. Illis quorum's equivalent in Swedish, the Medal for Noble Deeds (För medborgerlig förtjänst), therefore became in 1832 an award for long-lasting and solid locally emphasized efforts in the municipal and of a practical nature. Illis quourum was awarded to a large extent for e.g. cultural merits. The Medal for Noble Deeds, which is the Swedish version of Sui memores alios fecere merendo, was also instituted in 1832 to be awarded to Swedes, while the version in Latin is awarded to foreigners.

== Appearance ==
=== Sizes ===
Gold medal of the 8th size (GMbg8), gold medal of the 5th size (GMbg5) and silver medal of the 8th size (SMbg8).

=== Ribbon ===
The ribbon is royal blue with a yellow stripe toward each edge.

== Presenting ==
The medal is rarely awarded, on average less than once a year. Between 1975 and 2005, the medal was awarded only 17 times, and only in gold of the fifth size.

== Selected recipients ==
Year	Size	Medalist & citation	Ministry	Ref
1874	?	Alarik Liedbeck; During the explosion in Vinterviken's factory on 11 June 1868, Liedbeck saved a couple of dozen lives and a lot of property in the 1874 fire.	?	
1905	5th in gold	Anna, Ebba and Thyra Ekwall; On 11 April 1904, the Ekwall sisters, the daughters of Professor Knut Ekwall, with great danger to their own lives, saved their 27-year-old brother Olof Knut Ekwall from drowning in Lake Sommen.	King in Council	
1908	5th in gold	Nils August Lindberg; On 4 April, Lindberg saved the life of a fourteen-year-old chimney sweep apprentice. The apprentice was going to crawl into a chimney at Södra varietén in Stockholm and missed as he crawled into the chimney from the engine room instead of the one from the kitchen and got stuck in it with the fire under his feet and without a view to be able to get up. Lindberg noticed the danger, hurried up to the roof and down into the pipe but could not do anything on that road but had to enter another way. The doors were closed. He broke a window, then came through this, ran straight into the fireplace and managed after a while to pull the boy out, admittedly badly burned but alive.	King in Council	
1908	5th in gold	Eva Emilia Elisabeth von Platen; At the beginning of April, Miss von Platen, at the risk of her own life, rescued a small disabled and frozen 5-year-old, who had come out on a drift ice in Rönne.	King in Council	
1908	8th in gold	Elof Renhuldt; Renhuldt from Skinnskatteberg's mill saved a 6-year-old boy from drowning in the rapids next to the mill. Renhuldt has once before saved a human life.	King in Council	
1915	5th in gold	Styrbjörn von Stedingk; The youth Styrbjörn von Stedingk, son of the director of Djursholms AB, Baron L. von Stedingk, carried out a rescue operation on 16 June at Djursholm's steamboat pier when he saved a 9-year-old boy from drowning by diving after the one who had already disappeared.	King in Council	
1915	5th in gold	Per Elof Munck af Rosenschiöld; The schoolboy Per Elof Munck af Rosenschiöld, son of Mayor M. af Rosenschöld in Landskrona, saved two girls, eleven years old like himself, from drowning when they sank on the weak ice on 7 February in Landskrona harbor. He then pulled one girl up on solid ice and then managed, although he himself got into the water during the rescue attempt, to hold the other up until help arrived and both he and the girl were brought ashore.	?	
27 January 1933	5th in gold	Lieutenant Henrik Lange and conscript J. A. Christensson; For saving a conscript from drowning at Oskarsvärn in Karlskrona in September 1932.	King in Council	
27 January 1933	5th in gold	Customs inspector S. E. E. Jolin; For a rescue feat in the Port of Gothenburg in December 1932.	King in Council	
December 1943	5th in gold	Naval surgeon Lars Troell and furir P. K. Braun; Rescued of the crew of the German steamer Casablanca near Bogskär in the Sea of Åland in November 1943	King in Council	
July 1961	8th in silver	Överfurir Sven Richard Bäckström of Västerbotten Regiment; In October 1960, at the risk of his own life, Bäckström saved a comrade who had fallen on a downed high-voltage power line during a field exercise in the Umeå area	?	
1982	5th in gold	Fanjunkare Stig Bertsand, platoon leader at the Swedish Army Flight School (Arméflygskolan) in Nyköping; Rescued the crew from a burning aircraft wreck on 23 September 1981 at the risk of his own life	Ministry of Defence	
1985	5th in gold	Corporal Hans Gustavsson; When Gustavsson, while on duty as the Royal Guards at Stockholm Palace on 23 April 1985, he saved, at the risk of his own life, a 76-year-old man from drowning in Stockholms ström	Ministry of Defence	
1987	5th in gold	Ivan Hampling, Helena Hampling, Ingvar Bångdahl; This summer, they prevented a serious traffic accident by stopping a bus after the driver became ill	Ministry of Communications	
1991	5th in gold	Hamid Haji-Taheri; For his courageous and resourceful intervention during a bus ride, thereby preventing a major traffic accident	Ministry of Communications	
1992	5th in gold	Lieutenant Kuno Larsson; Who on 7 February 1990, in danger of his own life, saved the life of a conscript in connection with a hand grenade accident	Ministry of Defence	
1992	5th in gold	Birgitta Apelqvist, superintendent, Stefan Karlsson, superintendent For their brave and resourceful intervention in the tram accident in Gothenburg on 12 March 1992, when they drove their police car along the track before a speeding tram	Ministry of Communications	
1993	5th in gold	Lieutenant Mats Rullander; Who, on 27 October 1992, in danger of his own life, saved the life of a conscript in connection with a hand grenade accident	Ministry of Defence	
1994	5th in gold	Jonas Back, conscript For his resourceful and selfless intervention during a battalion exercise in March 1994 in Uppland Regiment for saving a conscript comrade from a fire in a camp tent	Ministry of Defence	
1997	5th in gold	Daniel Müller, conscript, Kasper Pettersson, conscript Resourceful and selfless intervention in a traffic accident during a practice drive in April 1997 at Fårösund Marine Brigade to save a trapped comrade from a burning off-road vehicle	Ministry of Defence	
1998	5th in gold	Thomas Brzezinski, Olav Reppert, Bengt Troberg, Olov Warolin; Because on 8 March, they bravely and resourcefully by helicopter rescued a distressed person from a hole in the ice	Cabinet Office	
