= Herbert Westermark =

Swedish physician and sailor

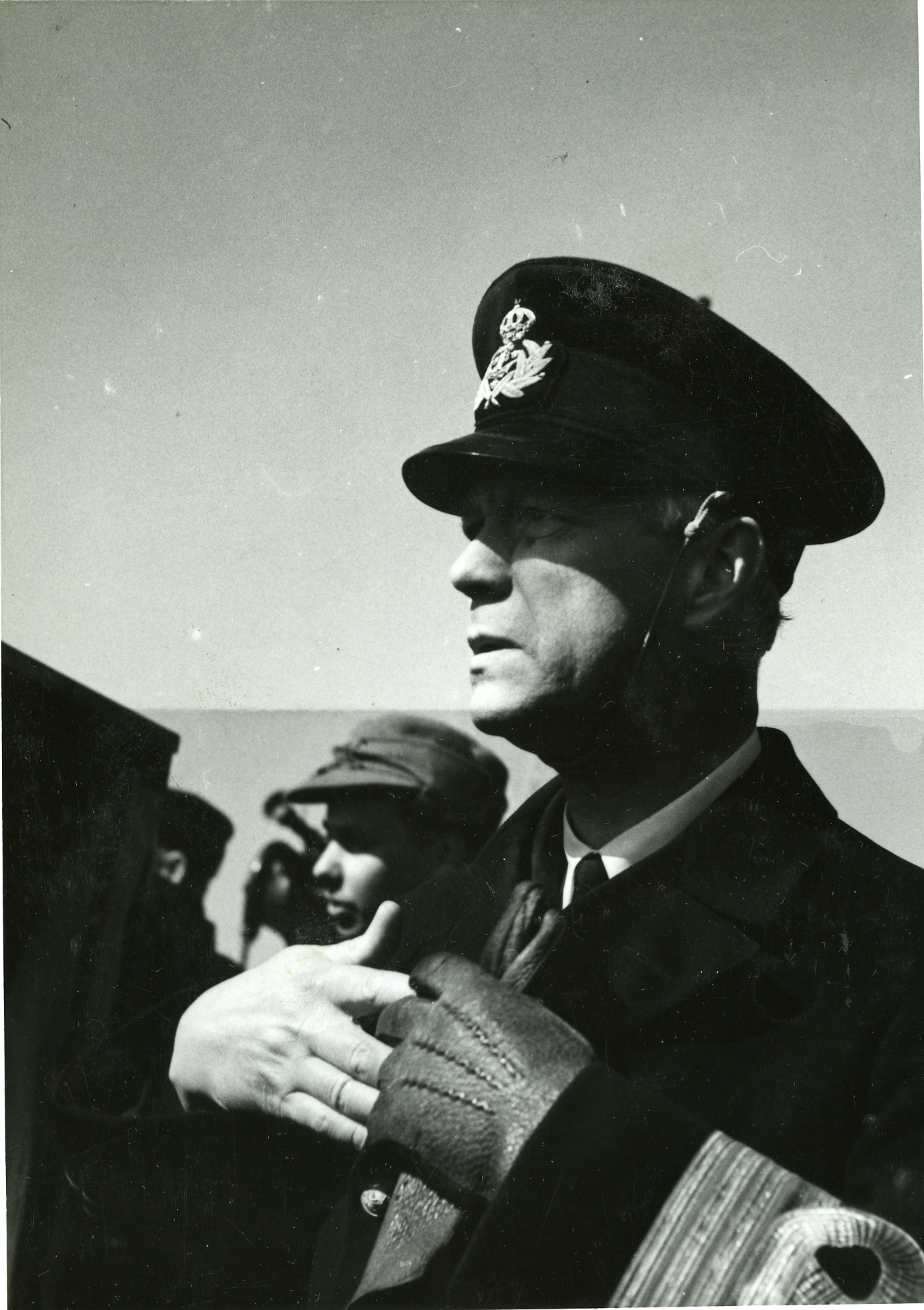
- Westermark in 1943
- Born: Johan Herbert Westermark; 30 August 1891; Stockholm, Sweden
- Died: 29 October 1981 (aged 90)
- Education: Karolinska Institute
- Years active: 1919–1956
- Medical career
- Profession: Naval surgeon
- Field: Naval medicine, obstetrics, gynaecology
- Institutions: Karlskrona Hospital, Allmänna BB, Serafimerlasarettet
- Awards: See below

Johan Herbert Westermark (30 August 1891 – 29 October 1981) was a Swedish physician. Westermark served as Surgeon-in-Chief of the Swedish Navy and head of the Swedish Naval Medical Officers' Corps from 1937 to 1956. He also competed at the 1912 Summer Olympics.

== Early life ==
Westermark was born on 30 August 1891 in Stockholm, Sweden, the son of Professor, M.D. Frans Westermark and his wife Maggie Cnattingius. He was the brother of radiologist Nils Westermark.

== Career ==
=== Medical career ===
Westermark received a Licentiate of Medicine degree in Stockholm in 1918 and then worked as an assistant physician (underläkare) at Karlskrona Hospital in 1919, aman at the obstetrics clinic at Allmänna BB in Stockholm in 1921. Westermark then worked at the gynecological clinic from 1923 to 1924 and as a general practitioner in Stockholm in 1925. He received a Doctor of Medicine degree in 1926 and worked in Bromma from 1926 to 1930.

Westermark became a naval surgeon of the 2nd class in the Swedish Naval Medical Officers' Corps in 1918 and of the 1st class in 1920. Westermark served as a staff doctor in the Coastal Fleet from 1925 to 1930, 1934, and 1935. He was appointed 1st naval surgeon in the Swedish Naval Medical Officers' Corps in 1936. From 1937 to 1956, Westermark served as Surgeon-in-Chief of the Swedish Navy and head of the Swedish Naval Medical Officers' Corps as well as Inspector for the Navy's Medical Service.

Westermark was a member of the board of the Swedish Medical Society (Svenska läkaresällskapets nämnd) from 1930 to 1955 and one of the principals for the Oscar II Jubilee Fund from 1937. Westermark wrote about personal history, naval medicine, obstetrics and gynecology.

=== Sports career ===
Olympic medal record

Men's Sailing
Silver medal – second place	1912 Stockholm	8 metre class

Westermark was also a sailor who competed in the 1912 Summer Olympics. He was a crew member of the Swedish boat Sans Atout, which won the silver medal in the 8 metre class.

== Personal life ==
In 1920, Westermark married Elly Carlström (born 1898), the daughter of Ludvig Carlström and Lisa Andersson. They had three children: Hans (born 1922), Gunnar (born 1926), Lars (born 1929).

== Awards and decorations ==
- (Sweden) Commander 1st Class of the Order of the Polar Star
- (Sweden) Commander of the Order of Vasa
- (Sweden) King Gustaf V's Olympic Commemorative Medal
- (Sweden) Swedish Red Cross Silver Medal
- (Sweden) Trafvenfelt Gold Medal

== Honours ==
- Member of the Royal Swedish Academy of War Sciences
- Member of the Royal Swedish Society of Naval Sciences
- Honorary member of the Association of Military Surgeons of the United States

Military offices
Preceded by Gunnar Nilson	Surgeon-in-Chief of the Swedish Navy Head of the Swedish Naval Medical Officers' Corps; 1937–1956	Succeeded by Lars Troell
