= David Lindsjö =

Swedish physician

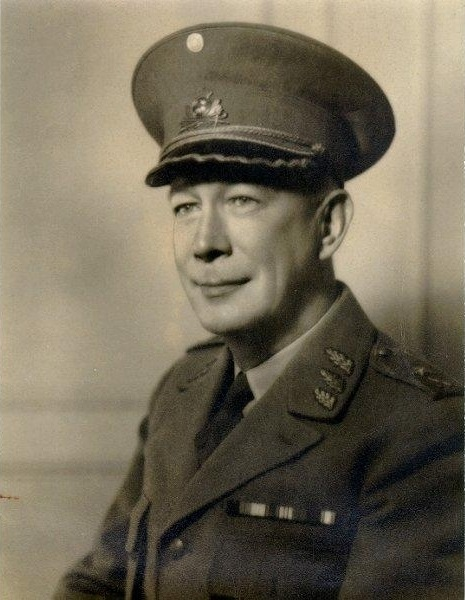
- Lindsjö in 1947
- Born: David Martin Lindsjö; 6 July 1887; Mjäldrunga, Sweden
- Died: 20 October 1952 (aged 65); Stockholm, Sweden
- Education: Karolinska Institute
- Years active: 1913–1952
- Medical career
- Profession: Physician
- Field: Military medicine, pediatrics
- Institutions: Samariten Children Hospital, Allmänna BB, Helsingborg Children Hospital
- Awards: See below

David Martin Lindsjö (6 July 1887 – 20 October 1952), was a Swedish physician. He served as the first Surgeon-General of the Swedish Armed Forces from 1944 to 1952.

== Early life ==
Lindsjö was born on 6 July 1887 in Mjäldrunga, Älvsborg County, Sweden, the son of Alfred Johansson, a clothier, and his wife Hanna Albertina Lindsjö. He passed studentexamen in Uppsala in 1906 and enrolled at Karolinska Institute in 1908. He received a Bachelor of Medical Sciences degree in 1913 and a Licentiate in Medicine degree in 1920.

== Career ==
Lindsjö served as battalion physician in the Swedish Army Medical Corps in 1921. Lindsjö was a member of the International Commission for the Exchange of Greek-Turkish Prisoners of War in 1923. He became battalion physician at the Royal Military Academy in 1925 and served as regimental physician in the North Scanian Infantry Regiment (I 6) in Kristianstad in 1928. Lindsjö then served as field physician in the Southern Army Division (Södra arméfördelningen) the same year. In 1936 he was placed in the reserve with that same position.

Lindsjö worked as physician at Helsingborg Children's Hospital and Childcare Centers from 1929 to 1936 and as chief physician of Stockholm City Volksschule and Childcare Board 1936 to 1943 (on leave from 1939). In 1939, Lindsjö was appointed Acting Surgeon-General of the Swedish Armed Forces and head of the Medical Board of the Royal Swedish Army Materiel Administration. On 2 October 1943 he resigned as Acting Surgeon General, thereby pointing out his dissatisfaction with the need for improved military medical care had not been satisfied. On 17 December 1943, he was appointed Surgeon-General of the Swedish Armed Forces, the first holder of this office. As Surgeon-General, Lindsjö was also head of the Medical Services Administration of the Swedish Armed Forces, from 1947 the Medical Board of the Swedish Armed Forces.

Lindsjö was also a member of the child care board, the volksschule board and the public health committee in Helsingborg. He was also a member of the Sydsvenska pediatriska föreningen ("South Swedish Pediatric Association") and the board of the Skånska barnavårdsförbundet ("Scanian Child Care Association") from 1929 and 1936. Lindsjö was chairman of the Svenska skolläkareföreningen (”Swedish School Doctor Association”) from 1938 to 1942 and Svenska läkaresällskapets sektion för pediatrik och skolhygien ("Swedish Medical Association's Section for Pediatrics and School Hygiene") from 1942 to 1944.

== Personal life ==
Lindsjö married in 1914 to Hedvig Augusta Grass (1890–1917), the daughter of August Grass and Alma Wahlström. They had one child, Anders Ingemar (born 1915). In 1928 he married Anna von Möller (1893–1989), the daughter of Adolf von Möller. They had two children, Agneta Lindsjö-Silfverforsen (1933–2015), who also became a physician, and Birgitta Lindsjö (born 1931) who became a nurse.

== Death ==
Lindsjö died on 20 October 1952 and was buried on 6 November the same year at Djursholm's Cemetery in Djursholm.

== Awards and decorations ==
=== Swedish ===
- (Sweden) Commander Grand Cross of the Order of the Polar Star (15 November 1949)
- (Sweden) Commander 1st Class of the Order of the Polar Star (6 June 1941)
- (Sweden) Knight of the Order of the Polar Star (1936)
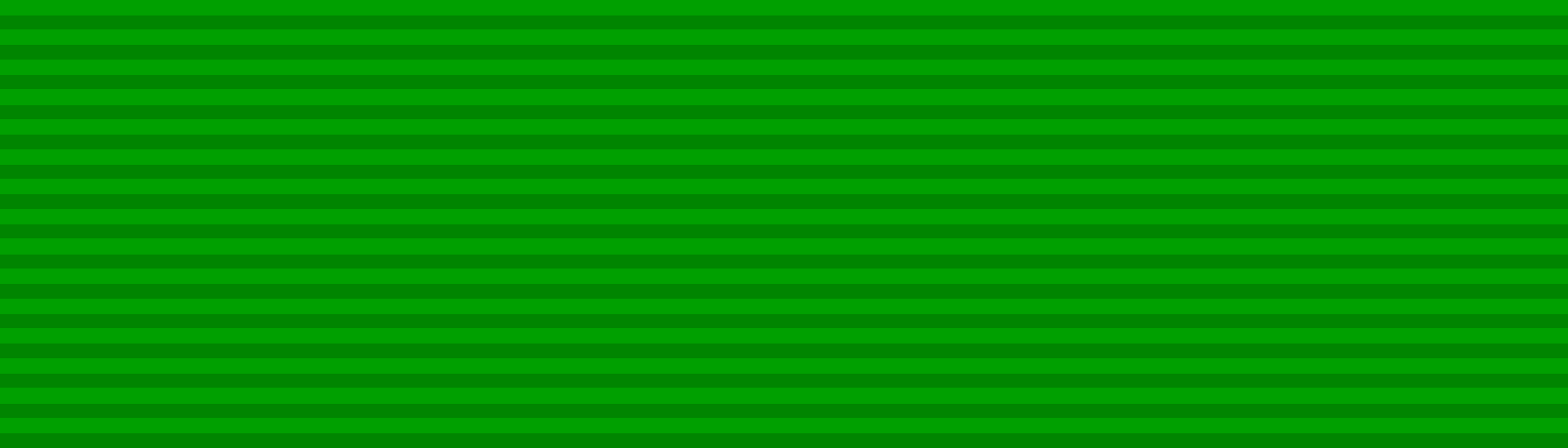
- (Sweden) Knight of the Order of Vasa (1926)
- (Sweden) Home Guard Medal of Merit in Gold (6 June 1950)
- (Sweden) Healthcare Gold Medal (Sjukvårdsguldmedalj) (Swedish Red Cross)

=== Foreign ===
- Commander 1st Class of the Order of the White Rose of Finland
- (Denmark) Commander 1st Class of the Order of the Dannebrog
- (Kingdom of Greece) Commander of the Order of George I
- (France) Commander of the Legion of Honour
- (France) Officer of the Legion of Honour
- (Nazi Germany) Order of the German Eagle with Star
- (Finland) 3rd Class of the Order of the Cross of Liberty with Red Cross
- (Norway) King Haakon VII Freedom Cross

== Honours ==
- Member of the Royal Swedish Academy of War Sciences (1941)
- Honorary Doctor of Medicine, Lund University (31 May 1947)

Military offices
Preceded by None	Surgeon-General of the Swedish Armed Forces; 1944–1952	Succeeded by Carl Erik Groth
