= Lars Troell =

Swedish physician

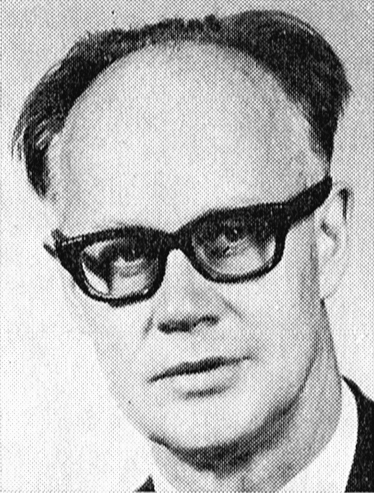
- Born: 21 April 1916; Stockholm, Sweden
- Died: 20 April 1990 (aged 73); Arvika, Sweden
- Education: Karolinska Institute
- Years active: 1941–1981
- Medical career
- Profession: Surgeon
- Field: General surgery, burn treatment, disaster medicine
- Institutions: Karolinska Hospital, Karolinska Institute
- Awards: See below

Lars Troell (21 April 1916 – 20 April 1998) was a Swedish physician. Troell began his medical career as an assistant physician and later became a renowned naval surgeon. He played a crucial role in advancing defense healthcare, contributing to research in areas like diving physiology and burn treatment. His international connections elevated the Swedish Navy's healthcare standards, and he introduced innovative war surgical training methods. Troell's work left a lasting impact on medical research and defense healthcare in Sweden. Troell served as the last Surgeon-in-Chief of the Swedish Navy and head of the Swedish Naval Medical Officers' Corps from 1959 to 1969.

== Early life ==
Troell was born on 21 April 1916 in Stockholm, Sweden, the son of Professor Abraham Troell and his wife Mia (née Gréen). He was the brother of agriculturist Gustav Troell. Lars Troell passed studentexamen in 1934. Immediately after studentexamen, Troell began his studies in medicine. Troell received a Bachelor of Medical Sciences degree in Stockholm in 1937 and a Licentiate of Medicine degree in 1941.

== Career ==
Troell worked as an assistant physician (underläkare) at the surgical clinic at Karolinska Hospital in Stockholm from 1941 to 1956. On 25 November 1943, Troell, aboard the destroyer HSwMS Norrköping, was involved in the rescue of the crew of the German steamer Casablanca near Bogskär in the Sea of Åland. At the time, Troell was serving as a naval surgeon in the 2nd Destroyer Division (2. jagardivisionen). He was awarded the Medal for Noble Deeds in gold for his actions.

Troell was appointed naval surgeon of the 2nd class in 1944, of the 1st class in 1946. He obtained a Doctor of Medicine degree from the Karolinska Institute in Stockholm in 1947 with the dissertation titled Inhalational therapy of experimentally provoked ileus. He became a docent in surgery at the Karolinska Institute in 1951 and served for an extended period in the burn unit. He was appointed as the 1st naval surgeon in 1953 and served as the last Surgeon-in-Chief of the Swedish Navy and head of the Swedish Naval Medical Officers' Corps from 1959 to 1969. Troell was a member of the 1962 Defence Medical Investigation (1962 års försvarssjukvårdsutredning) for the review of the Swedish defence healthcare management and more. Troell was the chief medical officer of the Naval Staff from 1969 to 1971, the chief medical officer at the Medical Corps Office of the Swedish Armed Forces Medical Board from 1971 to 1976, the chief medical officer at the National Swedish Government Employee Administration Board (Statens personalnämnd) from 1976 to 1979, and a senior physician at the National Swedish Labour Market Council (Statens arbetsmarknadsnämnd) from 1979 to 1981.

Troell played a significant role in post-war defence healthcare, which was in a slump after many competent colleagues had left the field following the end of World War II. With considerable effort, he created resources for research in areas such as diving physiology and burn treatment. Through an extensive international network, he enabled the Swedish Navy to benefit from modern military healthcare experiences. This made the navy a leader in the field within Sweden and gave it an international standing in development. It was also he who, based on experiences from the USA, introduced war surgical training on live experimental animals. This activity created a new research area and a training realism that was groundbreaking. He himself published a large number of works on general surgery, burn treatment, and disaster medical organization.

== Personal life ==
In 1939, Troell married Brita Norén (born 1918), the daughter of the dentist Oskar Norén and Karin (née Larsson). They had one son: Staffan (born 1939). In 1945, he married Anna Bernström (born 1919), the daughter of the merchant Bengt Bernström and Elsa (née Gahm). They had three daughters: Héléne (born 1946), Margareta (born 1949), and Cecilia (born 1950).

== Death ==
Troell died on 20 April 1998 in Arvika, Sweden.

== Awards and decorations ==
- (Sweden) Commander of the Order of the Polar Star (4 June 1960)
- (Sweden) Knight of the Order of Vasa (1954)
- (Sweden) Medal for Noble Deeds in gold (December 1943)
- (Finland) 4th Class of the Order of the Cross of Liberty with red cross
- (Finland) Finnish War Commemorative Medal
- (Sweden) Swedish Red Cross Medal of Merit, 5th size (31 January 1972)

== Honours ==
- Member of the Royal Swedish Society of Naval Sciences (1956)
- Member of the Royal Swedish Academy of War Sciences (1959)

== Selected biography ==
- Katastrofmedicinsk organisation i Öst-Pakistan: rapport från en studieresa i maj 1968 [Disaster Medical Organization in East Pakistan: Report from a Study Trip in May 1968.]. Rapport / Försvarsmedicinska forskningsdelegationen och dess katastrofmedicinska organisationskommitté, 99-0153767-3; 11 (in Swedish). Stockholm. 1969. SELIBR 839403.
- Marinens hälso- och sjukvård - en länk i totalförsvarets hälso- och sjukvård: dess mål och medel (in Swedish). Karlskrona. 1960. SELIBR 8816109.
- Birke Gunnar; Liljedahl Sten-Otto; ——, eds. (1957). Studies on burns. 1/3. Acta chirurgica Scandinavica. Supplementum, 0301-1860; 228. Stockholm. SELIBR 459700.
- The treatment of acute intestinal obstruction. Acta chirurgica Scandinavica. Supplementum, 0301-1860; 189. Stockholm. 1954. SELIBR 1433138.
- Studies on experimentally provoked ileus with reference to inhalational therapy. Acta chirurgica Scandinavica. Supplementum, 0301-1860; 122. Stockholm. 1947. SELIBR 1386201.

Military offices
Preceded by Herbert Westermark	Surgeon-in-Chief of the Swedish Navy Head of the Swedish Naval Medical Officers' Corps; 1956–1969	Succeeded by None
