= Gunnar Nilson =

Swedish physician

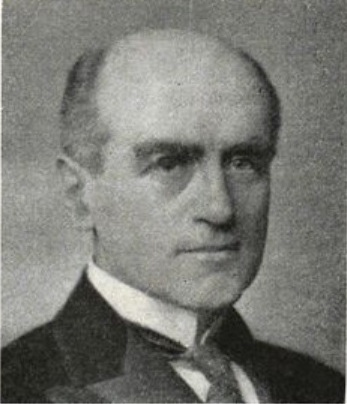
- Born: Lars Gunnar Edvard Nilson; 28 September 1872; Uppsala, Sweden
- Died: 28 March 1951 (aged 78); Stockholm, Sweden
- Education: Karolinska Institute, Lund University
- Years active: 1895–1937
- Medical career
- Profession: Naval surgeon
- Field: Naval medicine
- Institutions: Maria Hospital, Karlskrona Naval Hospital
- Awards: See below

Lars Gunnar Edvard Nilson (28 September 1872 – 28 March 1951) was a Swedish physician. He passed his mogenhetsexamen in 1890 and earned a Bachelor of Medical Sciences degree from Uppsala University in 1895. Nilson conducted study trips across several European countries before becoming a naval doctor for the Swedish Navy from 1898 to 1902. He completed his Licentiate of Medicine at the Karolinska Institute in 1899 and later became a naval surgeon in Karlskrona, where he oversaw the rebuilding of the Navy's hospital between 1906 and 1911.

Nilson earned his Doctor of Medicine degree in 1911 and served as Surgeon-in-Chief of the Swedish Navy from 1917 to 1937 and head of the Swedish Naval Medical Officers' Corps, also holding numerous prestigious positions within the medical and insurance sectors. He represented Sweden at international medical conferences and published around fifty works, focusing on naval surgery and healthcare. He is also known for his opposition to merging the army and navy healthcare systems, promoting specialized medical practices within the navy.

== Early life ==
Nilson was born on 28 September 1872 in Uppsala, Sweden, the son of Professor Lars Fredrik Nilson and his wife Alva Forssman. He passed mogenhetsexamen in 1890. He received a Bachelor of Medical Sciences degree from Uppsala University in 1895 and he performed study trips in Belgium, England, France, the Netherlands, Germany and Austria. Nilson was a doctor exhibitioner in the Swedish Navy from 1898 to 1902 and received a Licentiate of Medicine degree at Karolinska Institute in Stockholm in 1899.

== Career ==
After several medical employments, including from 1900 to 1903 at Maria Hospital in Stockholm, Nilson became naval surgeon of the 2nd class in the reserve in 1903 and served as naval surgeon of the 1st class and hospital doctor in the surgical department at the Navy's Hospital in Karlskrona from 1903 to 1917, whereby he planned and led its rebuilding from 1906 to 1911. Nilson received a Doctor of Medicine degree from Lund University in 1911 and was appointed first naval surgeon in the Swedish Naval Medical Officers' Corps in 1916. Nilson served as Surgeon-in-Chief of the Swedish Navy and head of the Swedish Naval Medical Officers' Corps as well as head of the Royal Swedish Naval Materiel Administration's Sanitation Department from 1917 to 1937.

In addition, he was from 1919 to 1940 the chief physician in the insurance company Lifförsäkrings-aktiebolaget De förenade and chief physician at the Reservespital XV in Vienna in 1916 and the Swedish government representative at the International Red Cross Conferences in Geneva in 1925 and in The Hague in 1928 as well as at the International Congress of Military Medicine and Pharmacy in London in 1929. Among his assignments it may also be mentioned that he was chairman of experts regarding the employment of military doctors at civilian hospitals in 1918 and regarding new regulations for the navy in 1927, board member of the Swedish Insurance Association (Svenska försäkringsföreningen) from 1922 to 1933 and a member of the Executive Board for Allmänna Änke- och Pupillkassan from 1926. He was secretary of the Swedish Medical Society from 1919 to 1940 and in the latter year became an honorary member there.

Nilson acted emphatically against the questionable merger of the army and navy healthcare system. Among other things, he promoted the application of ophthalmology in the navy and took an interest in the medical aspects of the naval air force. Nilson's approximately fifty writings in naval-hygienic, surgical and scholarly-historical subjects includes Sjökrigets kirurgi (1913), Marinens hälso- och sjukvård (1924; 2nd edition 1930), Hälso- och sjukvård till sjöss (1938), Berömda svenska läkare (1945) och Svenska läkaresällskapet 1908–1938 (1947, a continuation of the society's centenary history).

== Personal life ==
In 1906, Nilson married Clara Sofia Naumann (born 20 June 1885), with whom he had the children Gunnar (born 1906), Karin (born 1908), Ingrid (born 1913) and Gertrud (born 1916).

== Awards and decorations ==
- Swedish Red Cross Gold Medal (1923)
- Swedish Medical Society Lennmalm Medal in Gold (1947)

== Honours ==
- Member of the Royal Swedish Society of Naval Sciences (1908; its secretary 1910—13 and 1914)
- Member of the Royal Swedish Academy of War Sciences (1921)

== Selected bibliography ==
- Nilson, Gunnar (1913). Sjökrigets kirurgi ombord å stridsfartygen: föreläsningar vid marinläkarekursen i Stockholm 1912 (in Swedish). Karlskrona: Svenssons eftr.s bokindustri-ab. SELIBR 1637620.
- Nilson, Gunnar (1930). Marinens hälso- och sjukvård. Medicinskt folkbibliotek, 99-1306728-6; 7 (in Swedish) (2nd ed.). Stockholm: Bonnier. SELIBR 1340065.
- Nilson, Gunnar (1938). Hälso- och sjukvård till sjöss (in Swedish). Stockholm: Svensk litteratur i distr. SELIBR 1373963.
- Nilson, Gunnar (1945). Berömda svenska läkare: personhistoriska kulturbilder från trenne sekel (in Swedish). Stockholm: Geber. SELIBR 1411870.
- Nilson, Gunnar (1947). Svenska läkaresällskapets historia D. 2: 1 1908-1938 (in Swedish). Stockholm: Gen.-stab:s lit. anst. SELIBR 1411872.

Military offices
Preceded by Karl Rudberg	Surgeon-in-Chief of the Swedish Navy Head of the Swedish Naval Medical Officers' Corps; 1917–1937	Succeeded by Herbert Westermark
