= Swedish Naval Medical Officers' Corps =

Former administrative corps for military physicians of the Swedish Navy (1902–1969)

- Marinläkarkåren
- Active: 1902–1969
- Country: Sweden
- Allegiance: Swedish Armed Forces
- Branch: Swedish Navy
- Type: Medical corps
- Role: Military medicine
- Size: c. 200 people

Commanders
- Notable commanders: Gunnar Nilson

The Swedish Naval Medical Officers' Corps (Swedish: Marinläkarkåren, MLK) was an administrative corps established in 1902 for military physicians in the Swedish Navy and in the Swedish Coastal Artillery. The corps was amalgamated into the Medical Corps of the Swedish Armed Forces in 1969.

== History ==
The Swedish Naval Medical Officers’ Corps was organized in 1902 and included the military physicians of the Swedish Navy and the Swedish Coastal Artillery. Prior to that, the navy's physicians were subordinate to the National Swedish Board of Health. The navy has, as far as the healthcare is concerned, an identical history as the Swedish Army. As early as 1535, so-called bardskärer ("barbers") are mentioned in the navy; they were usually hired for each sea expeditions, after which they were dismissed. There was no initial healthcare at the shipyards, but the sick were usually sent to the respective home towns to be cared for there. Incidentally, these bardskärer or fältskärer were difficult to obtain (the 1567 sea-going fleet of 47 ships had only 17 fältskärer). Moreover, since they would be rather ignorant and the hygienic devices aboard were particularly deficient, great morbidity and mortality ruled the navy and the army, paralyzing military operations. With the arrangement of medical education in Sweden and the formation of the Swedish Army Medical Corps in the early 1800s, the conditions improved. However, in the context of the navy's renewal and expansion towards the end of the 1800s, the need for more independent orderly healthcare for the same appeared. The same was also true of the other European navies. The sea duty also required more specifically educated physicians. According to the decision of the state authorities in 1902, the Swedish Naval Medical Officers’ Corps was established. Except for the chief (the Surgeon-in-Chief of the Swedish Navy) with captain's rank, there were: 3 first naval surgeons with commander's rank, 12 naval surgeons of the 1st class with lieutenant's rank, or possibly with lieutenant commander's rank, 20 naval surgeons of the 2nd class with sub-lieutenant's rank, or possibly lieutenant's rank, 12 naval surgeon exhibitioners with sub-lieutenant's rank, as well as a reserve with corresponding positions.

By decision of the Riksdag of 1906, the Coastal Artillery's surgeons were transferred to the Swedish Naval Medical Officers’ Corps, whereby the regimental surgeon position at Vaxholm Coastal Artillery Regiment was changed to a first naval surgeon position and the 2 battalion surgeons at the Coastal Artillery were included in the corps as naval surgeon of the 1st class. In addition, grants were granted for a further 2 naval surgeon positions of the 1st class for each of Kungsholm Fortress next to Karlskrona and Fårösund Coastal Position. Another such position, intended for Älvsborg Fortress, was added by decision of the Riksdag of 1907.

In 1925, the corps consisted of the Surgeon-in-Chief of the Swedish Navy, 3 first naval surgeons (1 surgeons each at Karlskrona and Stockholm naval stations, and 1 fortress surgeon at Vaxholm Fortress), 13 naval surgeon of the 1st rank (could after 10 years of well-attended service be appointed first naval surgeon), 20 naval surgeons of the 2nd rank (could after 3 years be appointed naval surgeon exhibitioner of the 1st rank), 10 naval surgeon exhibitioners as well as 10 active duty naval surgeon exhibitioners of military age with a Bachelor of Medical Sciences degree or Licentiate of Medical Sciences degree who thus fulfilled their military service. In addition, there was a reserve of physicians. However, the 1925 Naval Order led to a reduction in the Swedish Naval Medical Officers’ Corps. In accordance with the personnel calculations made for the navy, the need for surgeons with a fixed salary in active service and thus duty of service all year round consisted of, in addition to the Surgeon-in-Chief of the Swedish Navy, 3 first naval surgeons and 6 naval surgeons of 1st class: 1 first naval surgeons at Karlskrona naval station, also fortress surgeons in Karlskrona Fortress, 1 first surgeons at Stockholm station, 1 fortress surgeons in Vaxholm Fortress, also surgeons at Vaxholm Coastal Artillery Regiment; naval surgeon of the 1st class: 5 in Karlskrona, of which 2 hospital surgeons, 2 barracks and district surgeons, 1 surgeon at Karlskrona Coastal Artillery Regiment and 1 barracks and district surgeon in Stockholm.

From 1 July 1961, the corps consisted of the Surgeon-in-Chief of the Swedish Navy, specialist naval surgeon and an ophthalmologist, first naval surgeon and naval surgeon of the 1st class and of naval surgeon of the 2nd class and naval surgeon fellows. In addition, there were staff in corps' reserve. In 1969, the Swedish Naval Medical Officers’ Corps was amalgamated with the Swedish Army Medical Corps and the Swedish Army Veterinary Corps, which formed the Medical Corps of the Swedish Armed Forces.

== Chiefs ==
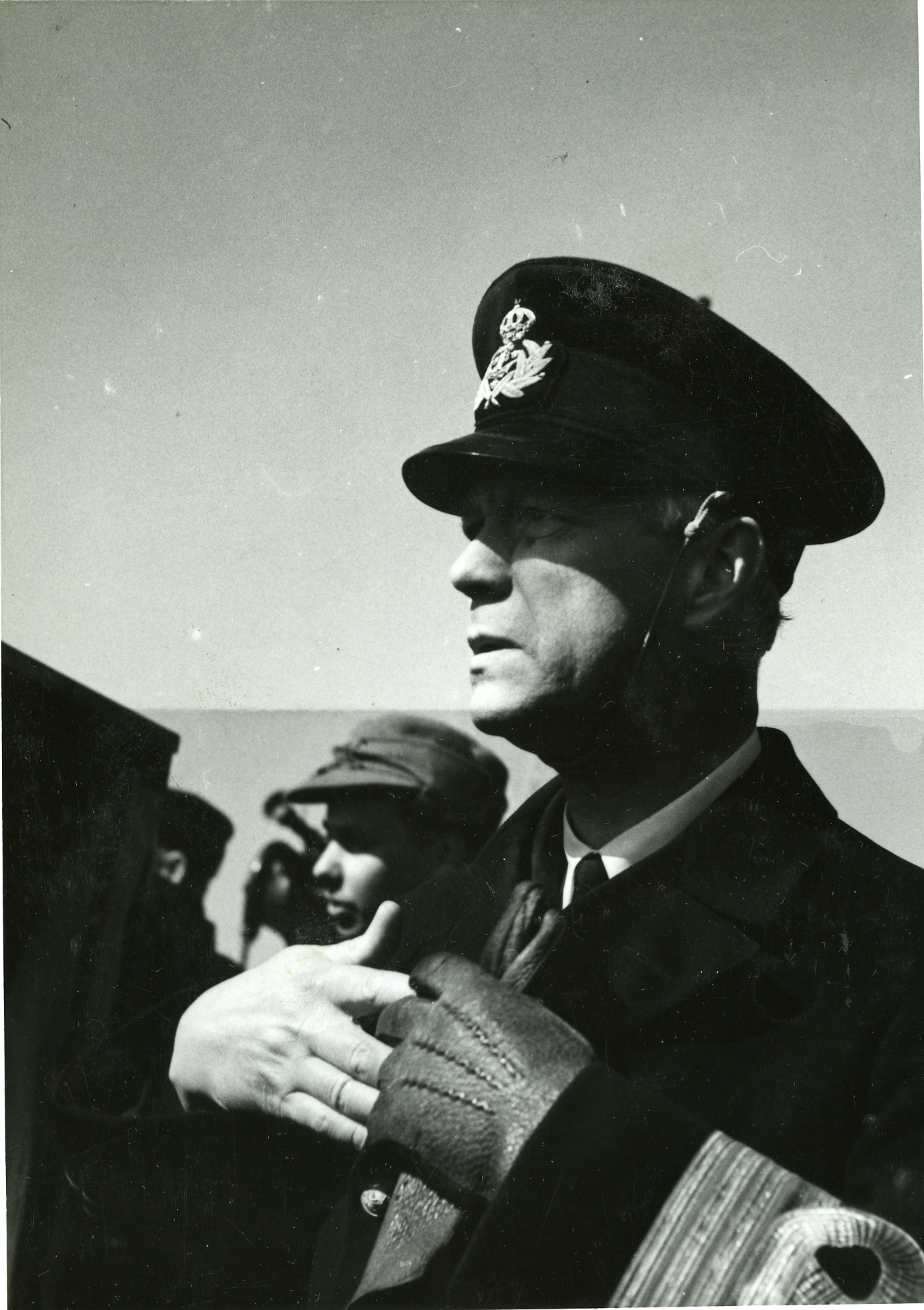
Surgeon-in-Chief of the Swedish Navy Herbert Westermark, head of the corps from 1937 to 1956.

The head of the Swedish Naval Medical Officers’ Corps was the Surgeon-in-Chief of the Swedish Navy and he was commander of the corps and its reserve as well as head of the Royal Swedish Naval Materiel Administration's Sanitation Department. He was to assist the National Swedish Board of Health in dealing with matters concerning the health and medical care in the Swedish Navy and in the Swedish Coastal Artillery, with the right to participate in the deliberations of the Board of Directors on these questions.

- 1902–1917: Karl Leonard Rudberg (Note: Rudberg served as Acting Surgeon-in-Chief of the Swedish Navy from 1902 to 1909, then as Surgeon-in-Chief of the Swedish Navy from 1909 to 1917. However, he was head of the Swedish Naval Medical Officers’ Corps from 1902 to 1917.)
- 1917–1937: Gunnar Nilson
- 1937–1956: Herbert Westermark
- 1956–1969: Lars Troell
