= Axel Höjer =

Swedish physician and public servant

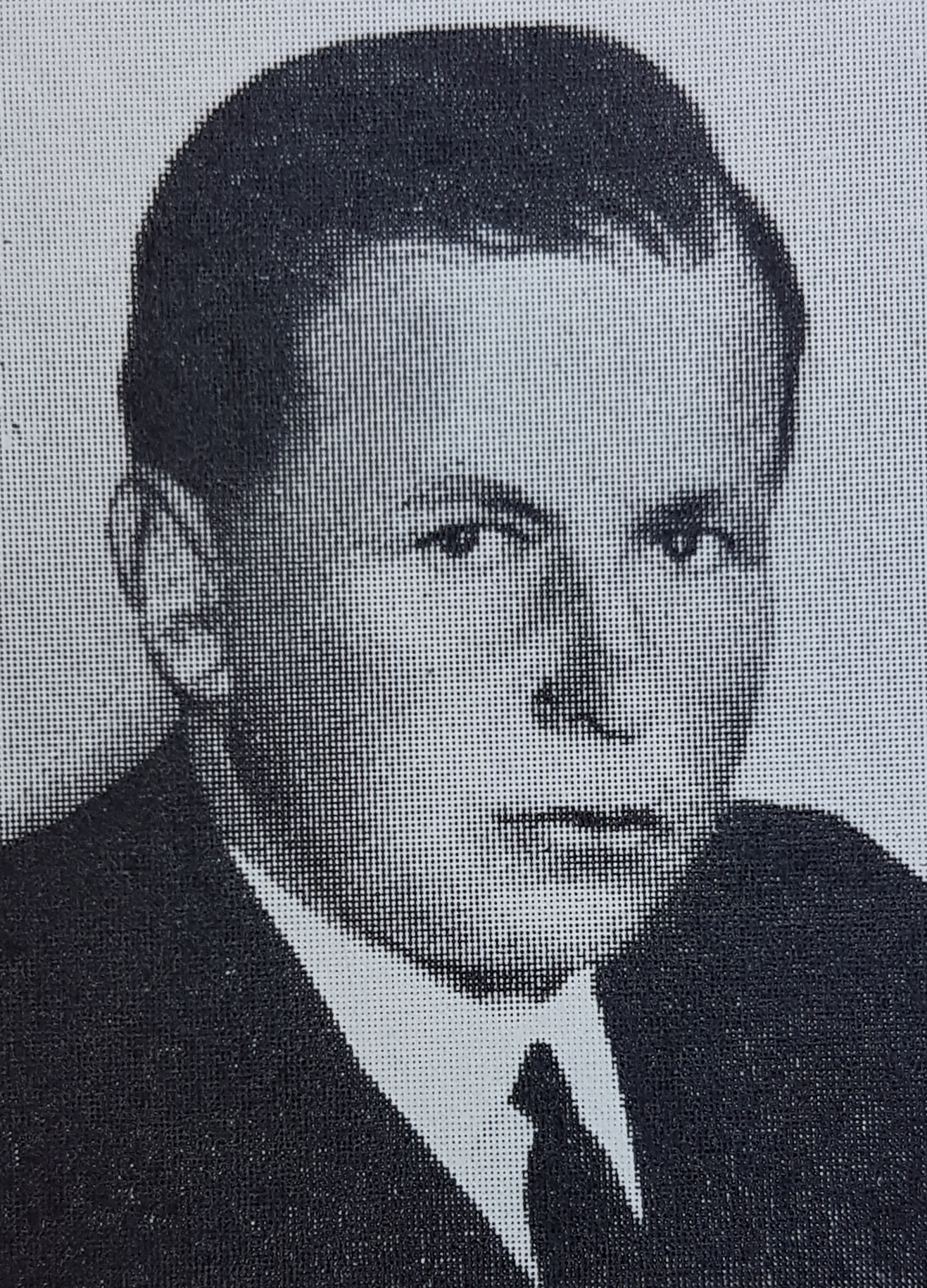
Johan Axel Höjer

Johan Axel Höjer (12 August 1890 – 22 April 1974) was a Swedish physician and public servant.

== Career ==
Höjer was born on 12 August 1890 in Visby, Sweden, the son of Professor Nils Höjer and Emmy Höjer. He began to study medicine at the Karolinska Institute in 1908 and became a Licentiate of Medicine in 1916. He went to Paris in 1919, where he became acquainted with the nurse Signe Dahl and they later married in 1920. In addition to his work and social commitment, in the early 1920s Höjer researched vitamin C and its role in connective tissue cell maturation. He submitted his thesis in Stockholm in 1924 for PhD degree as Studies in scurvy, and then became the associate professor of Hygiene in the Physiological Institute at Lund University.

In 1930, he was appointed as the city physician (stadsläkare) of Malmö and subsequently, in 1935, became Director General of the National Swedish Board of Health, a post he left in 1952. During his time on the Medical Board, he made several reforms in terms of preventive care, including family planning, maternal assistance and care of infants as well as dental services. Additionally during that time, the Vipeholm experiments on dental caries were conducted.

Höjer was appointed to the UN's expert commission for economic affairs and its housing commission. He was sent as a special officer for improving medical education in India at the request of Travancore-Cochin state (present-day Kerala state). Höjer was appointed as the Principal of the Medical College, Thiruvananthapuram in Kerala, a position he held until 1954.

After retirement, he worked on international issues, including the effects of the Vietnam War.

== The Höjer Investigation ==
Höjer led the Board of Health study in 1948 on health care reorganization. The study suggested a focus on preventive care and strengthening of provincial medical offices. The proposal was motivated in particular by the fact that the proportion of primary care physicians had declined because of the sharp increase in hospital doctors. In the study, the Medical Board argued against the Medical Association's view with regard to primary care. The report advocated a polyclinic model, where outpatient health care would be free and community-run.

The Höjer study was the first more comprehensive attempt to analyze the problems in outpatient care. It suggested the establishment of health centers of various kinds. The larger centers would include both specialists and general practitioners and would be located in hospitals. The minor ones would have two or more GPs and be located in the provincial doctors' stations. Höjer encountered considerable resistance from the medical professionals. He was exposed to virulent press campaign from colleagues calling for his resignation. As a result of complaints the commission's proposals could not be realized.

== Controversies ==
Höjer's combination of pacifism, socialism, anti-clericalism, anti-Nazism and temperance led to political persecution in Sydsvenska Dagbladet and Aftonbladet, Swedish newspapers. He was dismissed from a job as a teacher in the Southern Sweden Nursing School on the grounds that he held a lecture on sexual health. As city physician (stadsläkare) in Malmö, he tried to address air pollution from the Scanian Cement factory at Limhamn in Malmö. The company director threatened Malmö municipality, stating the company would move to another location if they followed the doctor's recommendations.

Concerning Jewish refugees, Höjer met stiff resistance from the management of the Swedish medical establishment. When a Jewish ophthalmologist had to leave his home after the German occupation of Danzig and tried to find work in Sweden, the medical professionals in the country sued to stop it, citing various reasons. A campaign with a hint of anti-Semitism was taken up by the medical establishments. When the Medical Board in 1939 planned to invite 12 Jewish specialty physicians to Sweden, the doctors' associations protested, suggesting it would lead to unemployment. Bollhusmötet, a protest arranged by the student body at Uppsala University, also spoke out against accepting Jewish refugees. The royal family intervened, and Höjer was called to the ruler, Crown Prince Gustaf Adolf, with the proposal that Sweden should accept only a small number of Jewish doctors who were fleeing Hitler's persecution. "He asked me pleadingly to refrain from proposals and actions, which could put the unity of the Swedish people in danger. I answered respectfully but firmly – with the Court Marshal listening in the background – that I obviously did not want to increase the government's difficulties, but I found that the request is primarily aimed to appease the anti-Semitic circles. It would be ignominious if Sweden were to betray people in danger. The Crown Prince reiterated his warning. I declared I would keep it in mind the future, and would do it if my conscience allows. We parted without further discussion". Höjer also asked to increase the number of doctors in the country, by importing Austrian physicians in 1950, which again was opposed by the Medical Association.

== Bibliography ==
- Om sjukvårdsväsendet i det finska frihetskriget januari–juni 1918. Tidksr. i militär hälsovård 1919.
- Parissjukhusens utveckling fram mot individuell isolering. 1920.
- Studies in scurvy. 1924.
- Hygieniska synpunkter på barnantalets reglering. 1928.
- Strumaundersökningar. 1928.
- Mjölkdroppar och barnavårdscentraler. 1929.
- Nikotinet och den unga kvinnan: Dialog mellan en rökande ung dam och en hygieniker. 1933.
- Vad jag tänker om öl. 1938.
- Some Aspects of Swedish social welfare. Royal Swedish Commission, the New York World's Fair. 1939.
- En läkares syn på befolkningsfrågorna. 1941.
- Uppgörelse med alkoholen i åtta teser: Ett ord till ungdomen. 1941.
- En maning till unga människor i nykterhetsfrågan. Jönköpings läns nykterhetsförbund. 1944.
- Sinnessjukvården i Sverige förr och nu. 1946.
- Hälsovård och läkarvård: i går — i dag — i morgon. 1949.
- Liv och död i det nya Indien / av J. Axel Höjer. 1955.
- Det fria Indien. 1959.
- Strömkantring i läkaropinionen om tobaken. 1961.
- Axel Höjer, J. (1975). En läkares väg: från Visby till Vietnam. Bonnier. ISBN 91-0-039379-7. (autobiography)

Government offices
Preceded by Nils Hellström	Director General of the National Swedish Board of Health; 1935–1952	Succeeded by Arthur Engel
