= Eugén Strömberg =

Swedish physician

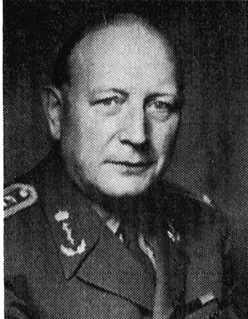
- Born: Osmin Adrian Eugén Strömberg; 4 March 1895; Oskarshamn, Sweden
- Died: 15 January 1971 (aged 75); Stockholm, Sweden
- Years active: 1929–1960
- Medical career
- Profession: Physician
- Field: Military medicine
- Institutions: Karolinska Hospital
- Awards: See below

Osmin Adrian Eugén Strömberg (4 March 1895 – 15 January 1971) was a Swedish physician. He served as Surgeon-in-Chief of the Swedish Army and head of the Swedish Army Medical Corps from 1953 to 1960.

== Early life ==
Strömberg was born on 4 March 1895 in Oskarshamn Parish, Sweden, the son of Håkan Strömberg and his wife Lovisa Jonsson. He passed studentexamen in Kalmar in 1913 and received a Bachelor of Medical Sciences degree in Stockholm in 1918 and a Licentiate of Medical Science degree in 1923 and finally a Doctor of Medicine degree in 1931.

== Career ==
Strömberg held various hospital positions in Uppsala and Gothenburg from 1929 to 1938.

Strömberg became a battalion surgeon in Västmanland Regiment in Västerås in 1923 and regimental surgeon there in 1927 and served in the same position in North Scanian Infantry Regiment in Kristianstad from 1930 to 1934 as well as in Göta Artillery Regiment in Gothenburg from 1934 to 1940. Strömberg served as health inspector from 1940 and 1949 and as an army surgeon in 1942. He became Acting Surgeon-in-Chief of the Swedish Army with the colonel's service class in 1949 and then served as Surgeon-in-Chief of the Swedish Army and head of the Swedish Army Medical Corps from 1953 to 1960.

Strömberg was a member of the 1944 Military Health Care Committee (1944 års militärsjukvårdskommitté), 1946 Eyesight Requirements Committee (1946 års synkravskommitté), the Military Doctor Salary Inquiry (militärläkarlöneutredningen) and an expert in the inquiry into health care during war in 1951.

== Personal life ==
In 1920, Strömberg married Ada Lundmark-Sundström (1895–1960), the daughter of restaurantkeeper Fredrik Sundström and Theresia Sjöblom. They had five children: Bertel (born 1921), Eugen (born 1922), Gunnar (born 1924), Ulf (born 1925), Ånn (born 1937).

== Death ==
Strömberg died on 15 January 1971 in Oscar Parish, Stockholm.

== Awards and decorations ==
=== Swedish ===
- (Sweden) Commander of the Order of the Polar Star (23 November 1953)
- (Sweden) Knight of the Order of Vasa (1938)
- (Sweden) Swedish Red Cross Silver Medal

=== Foreign ===
- Commander 1st Class of the Order of the Lion of Finland
- (Norway) King Haakon VII Freedom Cross

== Honours ==
- Member of the Royal Swedish Academy of War Sciences (1954)

Military offices
Preceded by Sigurd Kihlstedt	Surgeon-in-Chief of the Swedish Army; 1953–1960	Succeeded by Gustav Hesselblad
