= Surgeon-General of the Swedish Armed Forces =

Highest-ranking medical officer of the Swedish Armed Forces

- Försvarsinspektören för hälsa och miljö
- Coat of arms of the Surgeon-General.
- Incumbent; BGen Claes Ivgren since 20 October 2021
- Swedish Armed Forces
- Abbreviation: FIHM
- Reports to: Supreme Commander of the Swedish Armed Forces (Note: The Surgeon-General is directly subordinate to the Supreme Commander of the Swedish Armed Forces in accordance with section 3 of FIB 2020:5. Sections 21 and 21 a of the ordinance (2007:1266) with instructions for the Swedish Armed Forces state that when the Surgeon-General and the Chief of the Safety Inspectorate (Aviation Authority) (Flygsäkerhetsinspektören) exercise their supervisory or control function, the Surgeon-General and the Chief of the Safety Inspectorate (Aviation Authority) are not subordinate to the Supreme Commander.)
- Constituting instrument: FIB 2020:5, Chapter 13, 9 §
- Formation: 1914
- First holder: Anton Nettelblad

The Surgeon-General of the Swedish Armed Forces (Swedish: Generalläkaren, GL, previously Generalfältläkaren, since 2017 called the Försvarsinspektören för hälsa och miljö, FIHM) is the highest-ranking medical officer of the Swedish Armed Forces. The Surgeon-General is responsible for the supervision of the Swedish Armed Forces, the Defence Materiel Administration, the Swedish Fortifications Agency and the National Defence Radio Establishment. This includes supervision in the areas of environment, health, nature, sewage, waste and chemicals.

== History ==
A surgeon is a doctor who performs surgical operations. The Swedish Army's surgeons were named after their military rank: surgeon-captain, surgeon-major, surgeon-general, closest corresponding to the Swedish överfältläkare ("Surgeon-General"), but not generalfältläkare ("Surgeon-Field General"), because there were several surgeons-general within the English Army. In Swedish history, physicians were mentioned for the first time in the 16th century. They were educated at medical schools abroad and were employed partly in the service of the court or the rich nobility, and in the military. They lacked a relationship among themselves and were not subordinate to any medical authority. The beginning of an organized medical system was not noticeable until much later. Some practicing physicians in Stockholm received after subservient request permission to form a Collegium medicorum which was privileged by King Charles XI's regency in 1663. From this initially individual circle of physicians, the authority was developed that was given the task of overseeing the state's health and medical care.

The rank Surgeon-Field General (generalfältläkare) existed according to the 1856 instruction of the Swedish Army Medical Corps, but only during war time. In the Swedish Army Medical Corps on 1 January 1915, the following ranks were added; Surgeon-Field General (generalfältläkare) instead of Surgeon-General (överfältläkare), Surgeon-General (överfältläkare) instead of field surgeon (fältläkare) and field surgeon (fältläkare) instead of division surgeon (fördelningsläkare). The Swedish Army Medical Corps consisted in peace time of (except the reserve) 1 Surgeon-Field General (major general), 1 Surgeon-General (colonel, respectively lieutenant colonels), 6 field surgeons (lieutenant colonels), 49 regimental physicians (majors), 55 battalion physicians in military units, hospitals, etc. (captains), 44 battalion physicians in the Swedish Army Medical Corps (captains and lieutenants) and 24 field medical grantees (lieutenants).

The oversight of the entire Swedish medical administration was carried out for the civilian institutions by the National Swedish Board of Health and for the military by the Medical Board of the Royal Swedish Army Materiel Administration (Arméförvaltningens sjukvårdsstyrelse) and the Sanitary Department of the Royal Swedish Naval Materiel Administration (Marinförvaltningens sanitetsavdelning). The Medical Board consisted of a Director-General and Chief, as well as five directors (byråchef), including four doctors and a veterinarian. The Surgeon-Field General was the head of the Healthcare Board of the Royal Swedish Army Materiel Administration and the Surgeon-in-Chief of the Swedish Navy was the head of the Sanitary Department of the Royal Swedish Naval Materiel Administration. These officials were appointed by the King in Council. The Surgeon-Field General was in charge of the medical care management in the field, and was subordinate to the army's highest commander, and the acting Surgeon-Field General was in charge in the hometown.

On 17 December 1943, the title was changed from Surgeon-Field General (generalfältläkare) to Surgeon-General (generalläkare) when acting Surgeon-Field General David Lindsjö was nominated for this office. From 1969, the Surgeon-General was head of the Medical Board of the Swedish Armed Forces and the Medical Corps of the Swedish Armed Forces. Following the Swedish Armed Forces' reorganization in 1998, the Surgeon-General was part of the Joint Operations Command (Operationsledningen, OPL) as head of the Medical Services Department, but was in his capacity as the supervisory authority for the health service, responsible directly to the government.

On 1 April 2007, the Swedish Armed Forces decided that the Surgeon-General would only have a supervisory role. The functional responsibility for health and medical care was transferred from the Surgeon-General to the logistics function within the Armed Forces. Supervision was transferred to a newly started unit at the Swedish Armed Forces Headquarters. The Surgeon-General was given responsibility for this and also maintained the name. The position of Surgeon-General became civilian, but at the corresponding brigadier general level. The focus of the Surgeon-General's work was shifted from the health care area to the environmental area. The supervisory department was given 17 positions. On 1 October 2017, the regulatory agency Generalläkaren changed name to Försvarsinspektören för hälsa och miljö ("Defence Inspector for Health and Environment").

== Activities ==
The Surgeon-General verifies that the Swedish Armed Forces comply with laws and regulations relating to environmental and health protection, food safety, animal protection, animal welfare, animal health, health and medical care and disease control. In the area of environmental and health protection, the Surgeon-General is also responsible for supervising the activities of the Defence Materiel Administration, the Swedish Fortifications Agency and the National Defence Radio Establishment. Supervision and control involves an independent review of compliance with applicable legislation. Therefore, when the Surgeon-General exercises his supervisory and control function he is not subordinate to the Supreme Commander of the Swedish Armed Forces. Every year, the Surgeon-General carries out about ten inspections and around 400 supervisory and inspection visits to garrisons, units, installations and exercises, both in Sweden and in places where the Swedish Armed Forces operates internationally. The Surgeon-General is appointed by the government. In the Supervisory Department, administrative officers, doctors, nurse, veterinarians, environmental and health protection inspectors, food inspectors, lawyer and department manager work.

== Heraldry ==
The coat of arms of the Surgeon-General of the Swedish Armed Forces which was also used for the Medical Board of the Swedish Armed Forces from 1943 to 1994. Blazon: "Azure, the lesser coat of arms of Sweden, three open crowns or placed two and one. The shield surmounting a sword bendwise and a rod of Asclepius bendwise sinister in saltire, all or".

== List ==
No.	Portrait	Name	Took office	Left office	Time in office	Ref.
Surgeon-Field General (Generalfältläkare)
1	Anton Nettelblad, Hon M.D.	Anton Nettelblad, Hon M.D. (1852–1942)	23 December 1914	16 September 1917	2 years, 267 days	
2	Fritz Bauer, Hon M.D.	Fritz Bauer, Hon M.D. (1864–1956)	1917	1930	12–13 years	-
3	Richard Erhardt, L.Med.	Richard Erhardt, L.Med. (1876–1961)	1930	1939	8–9 years	
–	David Lindsjö, Hon M.D.	David Lindsjö, Hon M.D. (1887–1952); Acting	14 October 1939	1943	3–4 years	
4	Oskar Nordlander, L.Med.	Oskar Nordlander, L.Med. (1884–1953)	1943	1943	0 years	
Surgeon General (Generalläkare)
5	David Lindsjö, Hon M.D.	David Lindsjö, Hon M.D. (1887–1952)	1 January 1944	1 October 1952	8 years, 274 days	
6	Carl Erik Groth, M.D.	Carl Erik Groth, M.D. (1905–1993)	1952	1964	11–12 years	
7	Carl-Johan Clemedson, M.D.	Carl-Johan Clemedson, M.D. (1918–1990)	1964	1974	9–10 years	
8	Åke Lindgren, M.D.	Åke Lindgren, M.D. (1927–2020)	1975	1981	5–6 years	
–	Bo Rybeck, M.D.	Bo Rybeck, M.D. (1935–2019); Acting	1979	1980	0–1 years	
9	Bo Rybeck, M.D.	Bo Rybeck, M.D. (1935–2019)	1981	1985	3–4 years	
10	Björn Zetterström, L.Med.	Rear admiral Björn Zetterström, L.Med. (1937–2011)	1985	1997	11–12 years	
10	Ann-Marie Göransson, M.D.	Major general Ann-Marie Göransson, M.D. (born 1947)	1 July 1997	31 December 2003	6–7 years	
11	Sture Andersson, M.D.	Brigadier general Sture Andersson, M.D. (born 1950)	1 January 2004	31 December 2006	0–1 years	
–	Claes Meijer	Colonel; Claes Meijer (born 1955); Acting	2007	2007	0 years	
12	Siegfried de Joussineau, M.D.	Brigadier general Siegfried de Joussineau, M.D. (born 1949)	2008	2015	6–7 years	
13	Pierre Campenfeldt, M.D.	Brigadier general Pierre Campenfeldt, M.D. (born 1973)	1 October 2016	30 September 2017	364 days	
Defence Inspector for Health and Environment (Försvarsinspektören för hälsa och miljö)
1	Pierre Campenfeldt, M.D.	Brigadier general Pierre Campenfeldt, M.D. (born 1973)	1 October 2017	17 September 2023	5 years, 351 days	
–	Lena Orbelius	Lena Orbelius (born 1959); Acting	17 September 2023	30 September 2024	1 year, 13 days	
2	Daniel Lilja	Daniel Lilja	1 August 2025	Incumbent	1 year, 89 days	

== See also ==
- Surgeon-in-Chief of the Swedish Army
- Surgeon-in-Chief of the Swedish Air Force
- Surgeon-in-Chief of the Swedish Navy
