= Medical Corps of the Swedish Armed Forces =

Joint administrative corps of the Swedish Armed Forces

- Försvarets medicinalkår
- Coat of arms
- Active: 1969–1990
- Country: Sweden
- Allegiance: Swedish Armed Forces
- Branch: Tri-service
- Type: Medical corps
- Role: Military medicine
- Size: c. 780+ (1969)

The Medical Corps of the Swedish Armed Forces (Swedish: Försvarets medicinalkår, Medk) was a joint administrative corps for military physicians and military veterinarians in the Swedish Armed Forces. It was formed in 1969 (SFS 1969:409) by merging the Swedish Army Medical Corps, the Swedish Naval Medical Officers’ Corps and the Swedish Army Veterinary Corps. Its head was the Surgeon-General of the Swedish Armed Forces and was subordinate to the Supreme Commander of the Swedish Armed Forces. The Surgeon-General had at his disposal a staff body, the medical corps office, which was organizationally part of the National Swedish Board of Health (Sjukvårdsstyrelsen). Under the National Swedish Board of Health, the responsibility for the Swedish Armed Forces's health care lied with the military commander.

== Heraldry and traditions ==
=== Coat of arms ===
The coat of the arms of the Medical Corps of the Swedish Armed Forces 1981–1992. Blazon: "Azure, a sword and a rod of Asclepius bendwise sinister in saltire, all or."

== See also ==
- Surgeon-General of the Swedish Armed Forces
