= National Swedish Board of Health =

The National Swedish Board of Health (Swedish: Medicinalstyrelsen) was a Swedish government agency between 1878 and 1968, with responsibility for the health and medical services and the pharmacy services. All the activities in the field of public health in Sweden (including medical care) are either operated or controlled by public authorities. Public health is under the Ministry of Health and Social Affairs, the chief of which is a member of the cabinet. The National Swedish Board of Health was the principal instrument of the State for governing, superintending and promoting the activities and the work of the institutions pertaining to this field. The board supervised the medical personnel, the hospitals and the pharmacies and had the direct control of the State Pharmaceutical Laboratory, the State institutions for forensic medicine, a unit for mass radiofluorography etc. The National Swedish Board of Health was dissolved in 1968 and became the National Board of Health and Welfare.

== History ==
The National Swedish Board of Health originally stemmed from a corporation of physicians in Stockholm, which, under the name Collegium medicorum (later Collegium medicum), was granted certain privileges as early as 16 May 1663. These privileges were later confirmed and expanded, particularly through the so-called Medical Ordinances of 30 October 1688. It was not until a letters patent on 27 January 1813, that the college was transformed into a true administrative authority under the name Sundhetskollegium (the Health Board). Initially, it consisted of one chairman, one vice chairman, two medical councilors, and six assessors. Additionally, the senior physicians and professors who at the time held seats and votes in Collegium medicum were allowed to retain their positions for life. According to an instruction issued on 6 December 1815, Sundhetskollegium was given oversight and administration over all matters concerning public health, medical care, and nursing, both for the general population and within the military forces on land and at sea, in both peacetime and wartime. As early as 1821, two assessor positions were abolished, and in 1841, all remaining assessors, as well as the vice chairman's position, were also removed. However, in the same year, the number of medical councilors was increased to four. Sundhetskollegium had a significantly broader scope of responsibilities than Collegium medicum. Among other duties, it was tasked with providing opinions in forensic medical cases, overseeing veterinary affairs, supervising the dental and barber surgeon professions, and managing variolation, among other responsibilities. However, it was not until 1876 that the oversight of hospitals and mental health care (previously managed by the Serafimerorden's guild, Serafimerordensgillet) was transferred to Sundhetskollegium. From 1878 onward, the authority was officially named the National Swedish Board of Health. The organizational framework for the new institution was established on 1 June 1877, and its formal instructions were issued on 2 November of the same year.

With occasional minor modifications over time, the most significant of which took place on 31 December 1900, this instruction largely remained in effect. However, a proposal for the reorganization of the National Swedish Board of Health was under consideration, based on a report submitted by a special committee on 16 November 1909. The National Swedish Board of Health consisted of one chairman, titled director general, and five medical councilors. The director general and four of the medical councilors were required to be licensed physicians, while the fifth medical councilor had to be a licensed veterinarian. The administrative staff included one secretary, one registrar, and three notaries in the chancellery, as well as two accountants and one treasurer in the financial office. Additionally, the board was assisted by an ombudsman and legal officer, a chief inspector for mental health care, a hospital controller, and an architect, along with the necessary number of assistants and temporary staff. For bacteriological and forensic chemical investigations, the board had at its disposal a State Medical Institute (Statsmedicinska anstalten), which included a bacteriological and a forensic chemical department. The National Swedish Board of Health exercised supreme supervision over public health and medical care in Sweden and handled matters related to the national medical system. It oversaw all individuals engaged in the practice of medicine or pharmacy, except for university professors in their academic roles. It also served as the supervisory authority for the nation's hospitals and had general oversight of mental health care. Furthermore, the board oversaw hospitals, cottage hospitals, bathing facilities, and other similar health institutions, as well as the pharmacy system, midwifery, and the barber surgeon profession. It also supervised practitioners of dentistry and physiotherapy. The National Swedish Board of Health was responsible for providing courts, public and municipal authorities, and officials with the information they required within its area of expertise, as well as investigating forensic medical matters. Finally, the board had a special duty to monitor the management of epidemic disease control and to exercise supreme supervision over variolation in the country and the institutions established to promote it.

The National Swedish Board of Health, which had been under the Ministry of Health and Social Affairs since 1 July 1963, was the highest administrative authority in the field. Its primary task was to oversee the activities of medical personnel, healthcare institutions, and pharmacies, as well as to exercise supreme management of state mental hospitals and other institutions. It was organized into nine bureaus. Alongside the National Swedish Board of Health, there were various advisory bodies and committees for specific issues. In addition to the National Swedish Board of Health, several other central institutions operated in the field of public health and medical care. The National Institute of Public Health (Statens institut för folkhälsan) was primarily responsible for conducting scientific and practical investigations and carrying out research in the areas of general hygiene, food hygiene, and occupational hygiene. It also served as the central investigative body for food control under the Food Ordinance and provided certain educational instruction. Matters concerning occupational health and hygiene were handled by the National Swedish Institute of Occupational Health (Arbetsmedicinska institutet). The Central Board of Hospital Planning and Equipment (Centrala sjukvårdsberedningen) was responsible for providing advice on the planning of hospital buildings and their equipment, as well as promoting standardization and rationalization of hospital supplies and operations. The National Bacteriological Laboratory (Statens bakteriologiska laboratorium) was tasked with research, investigations, and the production of sera, vaccines, and other materials in the fields of bacteriology, virology, and epidemiology within human medicine.

As of 1 January 1968, the highest administrative body for health and medical care was the National Board of Health and Welfare, which was formed through a merger of the National Swedish Board of Health and the old National Board of Health and Welfare.

== Chairman of the Sundhetskollegium ==
- 1813–1822: David von Schulzenheim
- 1822–1841: Christian Ehrenfried von Weigel
- 1841–1849: Erik af Edholm
- 1849–1860: Carl Johan Ekströmer
- 1860–1864: Magnus Huss
- 1864–1873: Nils Johan Berlin (acting)
- 1873–1877: Nils Johan Berlin

== Directors General of the National Swedish Board of Health ==
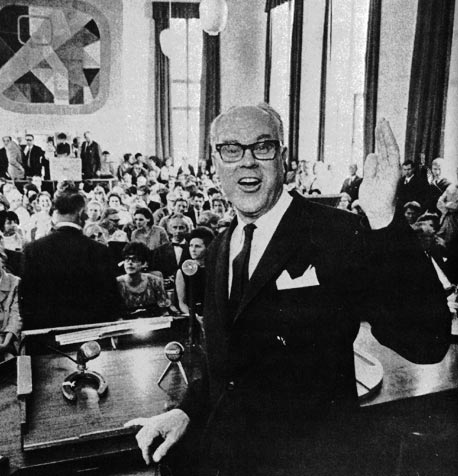
Bror Rexed, the last Director-General of the National Swedish Board of Health.

- 1877–1883: Nils Johan Berlin
- 1883–1898: August Almén
- 1898–1913: Klas Linroth
- 1913–1928: Bertil Buhre
- 1928–1935: Nils Hellström
- 1935–1952: Axel Höjer
- 1952–1967: Arthur Engel
- 1967–1968: Bror Rexed
