= Gösta Odqvist =

Swedish Air Force officer

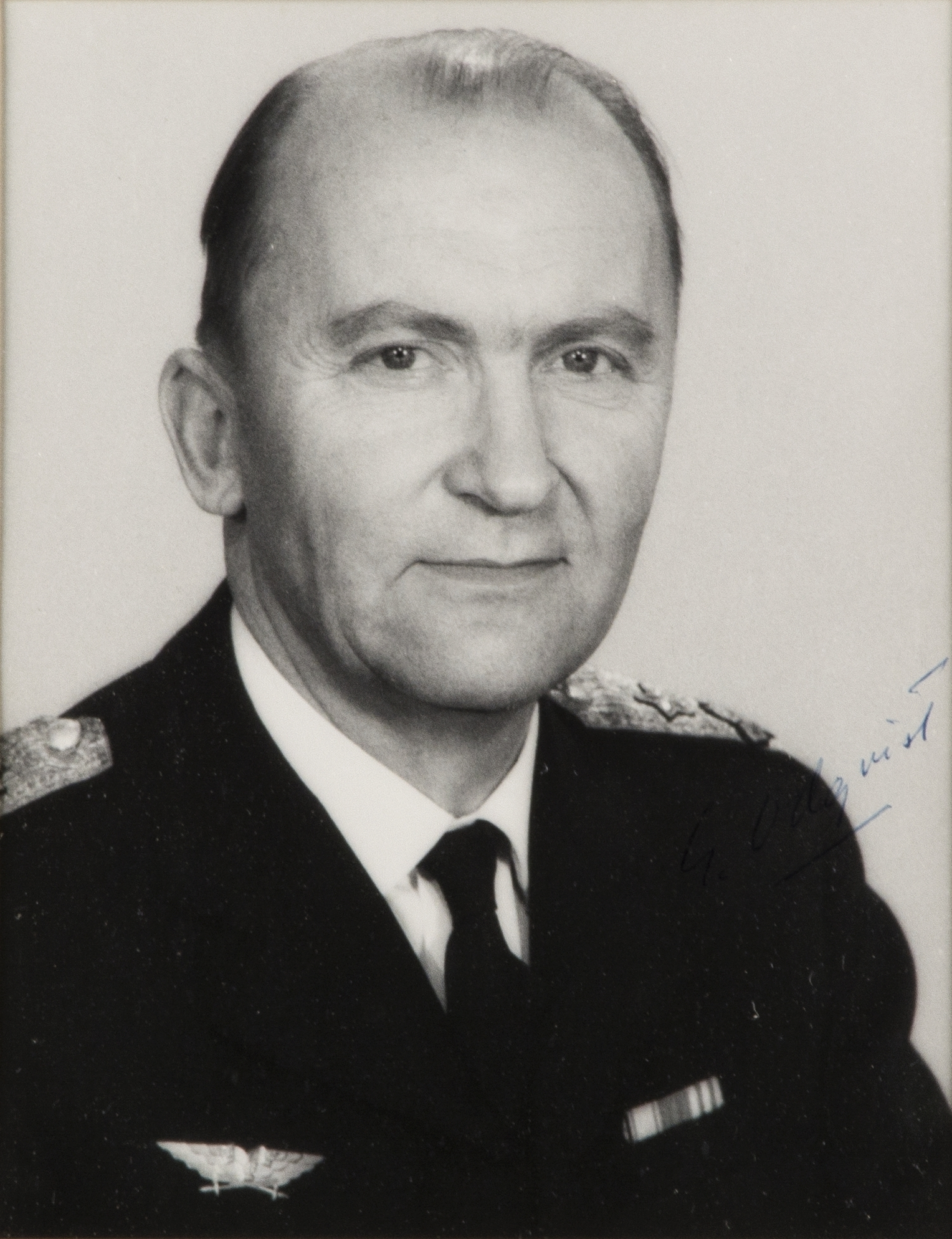
- Born: 9 January 1913; Uppsala, Sweden
- Died: 15 February 2005 (aged 92); Västerås, Sweden
- Military career
- Allegiance: Sweden
- Branch: Swedish Air Force
- Service years: 1935–1973
- Rank: Lieutenant General
- Commands: Swedish Air Force Squadron Leader School; Flygvapnets krigsskola; Västmanland Wing; Vice Chief of the Air Staff; 4th Air Command; Chief of the Air Staff; 1st Air Command

Lieutenant General Gösta Odqvist (9 January 1913 – 15 February 2005) was a Swedish Air Force officer. His senior commands include commanding officer of the Västmanland Wing (F 1), Commanding General of the 4th Air Command (E 4), the Chief of the Air Staff and Commanding General of the 1st Air Command.

== Early life ==
Odqvist was born on 9 January 1913 in Uppsala, Sweden, the son of lieutenant colonel Hjalmar Odqvist and his wife Ella (née Nordlöf). He grew up in Strängnäs where his father was an officer in the Södermanland Regiment (I 10). He passed studentexamen in 1932 and trained as an officer at the Military Academy Karlberg.

== Career ==
Odqvist became an officer in 1935 and was commissioned as second lieutenant and assigned to Södermanland Regiment (I 10). The Swedish Air Force was now under strong construction, which attracted him. He joined the Air Force, underwent pilot training at the Swedish Air Force Flying School, finishing in 1937. He became lieutenant in the Air Force in 1939 and captain in 1942. Odqvist completed the staff course of the Royal Swedish Air Force Staff College from 1944 to 1945 and then served in the Air Staff. He was teacher at the Royal Swedish Air Force Staff College and the Artillery and Engineering College from 1944 to 1949 when he was promoted to major. Odqvist then served as chief of staff in the 1st Air Command from 1949 to 1951 and then as commanding officer of the Swedish Air Force Squadron Leader School (Flygvapnets bomb- och skjutskola, FBS) from 1951 to 1952 when he was promoted to lieutenant colonel.

Odqvist was commanding officer of the Flygvapnets krigsskola (F 20) from 1952 to 1954 and the Västmanland Wing (F 1) from 1954 to 1959. In 1955, Oqvist was promoted to colonel and from 1959 to 1961 he was Vice Chief of the Air Staff. He was appointed Commanding General of the 4th Air Command (Fjärde flygeskadern, E 4) in 1961 and the year after he was promoted to major general. In 1964, Odqvist was appointed Chief of the Air Staff and in 1966 he was appointed Commanding General of the 1st Air Command. He left the position in 1973 and retired from active service and was then also promoted to lieutenant general.

After retirement, Västerås became his home town. He was unanimously elected to chairman of the F 1 Kamratförening, a position he held until 1990, when he became honorary chairman of the association. Odqvist was chairman of the Swedish Aviation Historical Society (Svensk flyghistorisk förening, SFF) from 1974 to 1978 and governor of the Rotary International's district 234 from 1979 to 1980. He became honorary member of the Swedish Aviation Historical Society in 1982.

== Personal life ==
In 1938, Odqvist married Märta Sundell (1911–2003), the daughter of the Ernst Sundell and Elin (née Olsson). He was the father of Eva (born 1941), Kerstin (born 1944), Ulla (born 1946) and Inger (born 1947). His daughter Ulla, a diplomat, was one of the hostages of the 1975 AIA building hostage crisis in Kuala Lumpur.

The farm Kalfsund in Överenhörna socken was acquired by the Odqvist's in 1941.

== Death ==
His wife Märta died on 13 August 2003 and he on 15 February 2005 in Västerås. They are buried at Överenhörna Church, a few kilometers from Kalfsund.

== Dates of rank ==
- 1935 – Second lieutenant (Swedish Army)
- 1939 – Lieutenant (Swedish Air Force)
- 1942 – Captain
- 1949 – Major
- 1952 – Lieutenant colonel
- 1955 – Colonel
- 1962 – Major general
- 1973 – Lieutenant general

== Awards and decorations ==
=== Swedish ===
- (Sweden) Commander Grand Cross of the Order of the Sword (5 June 1971)
- (Sweden) Commander 1st Class of the Order of the Sword (6 June 1962)
- (Sweden) Knight of the Order of Vasa
- (Sweden) Swedish Women's Voluntary Defence Organization Royal Medal of Merit in silver

=== Foreign ===
- Commander of the Order of the Crown of Thailand

== Honours ==
- Member of the Royal Swedish Academy of War Sciences (1960)

== Bibliography ==
- Odqvist, Gösta (1987). Min krönika (in Swedish). [Västerås]: [G. Odqvist]. SELIBR 701124.
- Odqvist, Gösta; Andersson, Uno; Andersson, Stig, eds. (1985). Kungl. Västmanlands flygflottiljs historia. D. 2, 1979-1983(1985) (in Swedish). Västerås: Västmanlands regementes och flygflottiljs kamratfören. SELIBR 604902.
- Odqvist, Gösta, ed. (1979). Kungl. Västmanlands flygflottiljs historia [D. 1] 1929-1979 (in Swedish). [Västerås]: [Komm.] SELIBR 604901.
- Odqvist, Gösta (1965). Svenskt luftförsvar åren 1945-1975 mot bakgrund av utvecklingen i utlandet: årsberättelse av föredraganden i luftkrigsvetenskap (avd III) (in Swedish). Linköping. SELIBR 12032912.

Military offices
Preceded by Ingvar Berg	Västmanland Wing; 1954–1959	Succeeded by Henrik Nordström
Preceded by Stig Möller	Vice Chief of the Air Staff; 1959–1961	Succeeded by Nils Personne
Preceded by Greger Falk	4th Air Command; 1961–1964	Succeeded by Åke Mangård
Preceded by Stig Norén	Chief of the Air Staff; 1964–1966	Succeeded by Claës-Henrik Nordenskiöld
Preceded by Stig Norén	1st Air Command; 1966–1973	Succeeded by Bengt Rosenius
