= Hans Neij =

Swedish Air Force officer

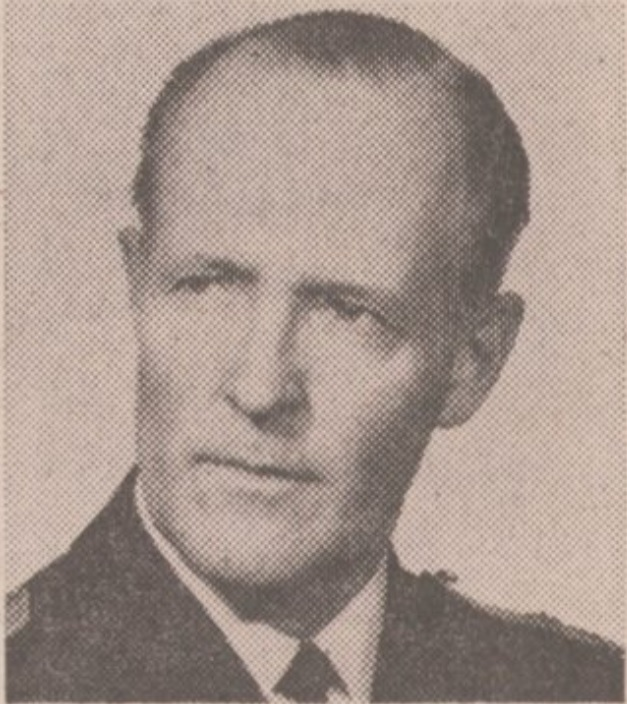
- Born: Arvid Hans Magnus Neij; 22 June 1921; Jönköping, Sweden
- Died: 24 April 1985 (aged 63); Fort Walton Beach, Florida, USA
- Military career
- Allegiance: Sweden
- Branch: Swedish Air Force
- Service years: 1939–1985
- Rank: Major General
- Commands: Bråvalla Wing; Section 2, Air Staff; Chief of Staff, Milo Ö; Chief of the Air Staff

Major General Arvid Hans Magnus Neij (22 June 1921 – 24 April 1985) was a Swedish Air Force officer.

== Early life ==
Neij was born on 22 June 1921 in Jönköping, Sweden, the son of Arvid Neij, an adjunct lecturer, and his wife Elsa (née Lund). He passed studentexamen in 1939 and attended the Swedish Air Force Candidate and Cadet School (Flygvapnets aspirant- och kadettskola) from 1939 to 1942.

== Career ==
Neij was commissioned as an officer in the Swedish Air Force in 1942 and was promoted to lieutenant in 1944. Neij attended the Royal Swedish Air Force Staff College from 1947 to 1948 and its Staff Course from 1948 to 1949. He was promoted to captain in 1949 and to major in 1955. He attended the Swedish National Defence College in 1956 and then served as an Air Force Press Officer from 1955 to 1958.

Neij, then a Captain of Södermanland Wing (F 11) at Nyköping, broke the world speed record with his S-29C on 23 March 1955. Scooting along a 1,000-kilometer closed circuit, Neij and his wingman Birger Eriksson averaged 559.6 miles per hour (900.6 km/h) to better the existing record of 510.8 miles per hour (822.1 km/h) set in 1950 by a Gloster Meteor Mk 8. The distance was covered in 1 hour, 6 min, 37 sec.

In 1959 he was promoted to lieutenant colonel. Neij served as head of the Air Force program within the Swedish Armed Forces Staff College from 1961 to 1964 and he was promoted to colonel in 1963. Neij served as commander of Bråvalla Wing (F 13) from 1964 to 1966 and of Section 2 in the Air Staff from 1966 to 1970 when he was promoted to major general and appointed chief of staff of the Eastern Military District. In 1973, Neij was appointed Chief of the Air Staff. After five years in this position, Neij was appointed defense and air attaché in Washington, D.C. and Ottawa in 1978, serving until his death in 1985.

== Personal life ==
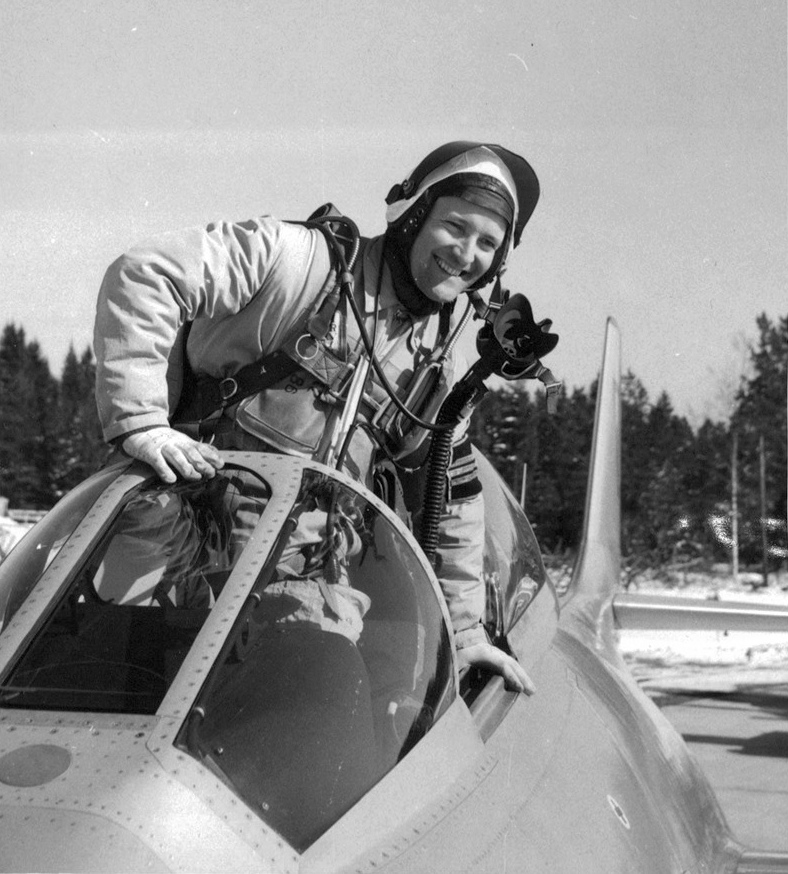
Captain Neij in his S-29C after breaking the world speed record in 1955.

In 1942, he married Kerstin Gyllenberg (born 1922), the daughter of station master Clæs Gyllenberg and Ellen (née Pettersson).

== Death ==
Neij died in a drowning accident during a holiday stay in Fort Walton Beach, Florida. He was interred on 6 May 1985 at Västra Karup Church in Västra Karup.

== Dates of rank ==
- 1942 – Second lieutenant
- 1944 – Lieutenant
- 1949 – Captain
- 1955 – Major
- 1959 – Lieutenant colonel
- 1963 – Colonel
- 1970 – Major general

== Awards and decorations ==
=== Swedish ===
- (Sweden) Commander of the Order of the Sword (6 June 1966)
- (Sweden) Knight of the Order of the Sword
- (Sweden) Royal Swedish Aero Club's Silver Medal
- (Sweden) Air Force Badge in Silver

=== Foreign ===
- (United States) Officer of the Legion of Merit (13 June 1985; posthumously)

== Honours ==
- Member of the Royal Swedish Academy of War Sciences

Military offices
Preceded by Bengt Lundvall	Chief of Staff of the Eastern Military District; 1970–1973	Succeeded by Nils-Fredrik Palmstierna
Preceded by Dick Stenberg	Chief of the Air Staff; 1973–1978	Succeeded by Erik Nygren
