= General Persson =

General Persson may refer to:

- Anders Persson (Swedish Air Force officer) (born 1968), Swedish Air Force brigadier general
- Lars G. Persson (born 1937), Swedish Coastal Artillery lieutenant general
- Lars-Bertil Persson (born 1934), Swedish Air Force major general

== See also ==
- Thomas Person (1733–1800), North Carolina Militia brigadier general in the American Revolutionary War
- Nils Personne (1918–2013), Swedish Air Force lieutenant general
- Wilton Persons (1896–1977), U.S. Army major general
