= Claës-Henrik Nordenskiöld =

Swedish Air Force officer and sailor

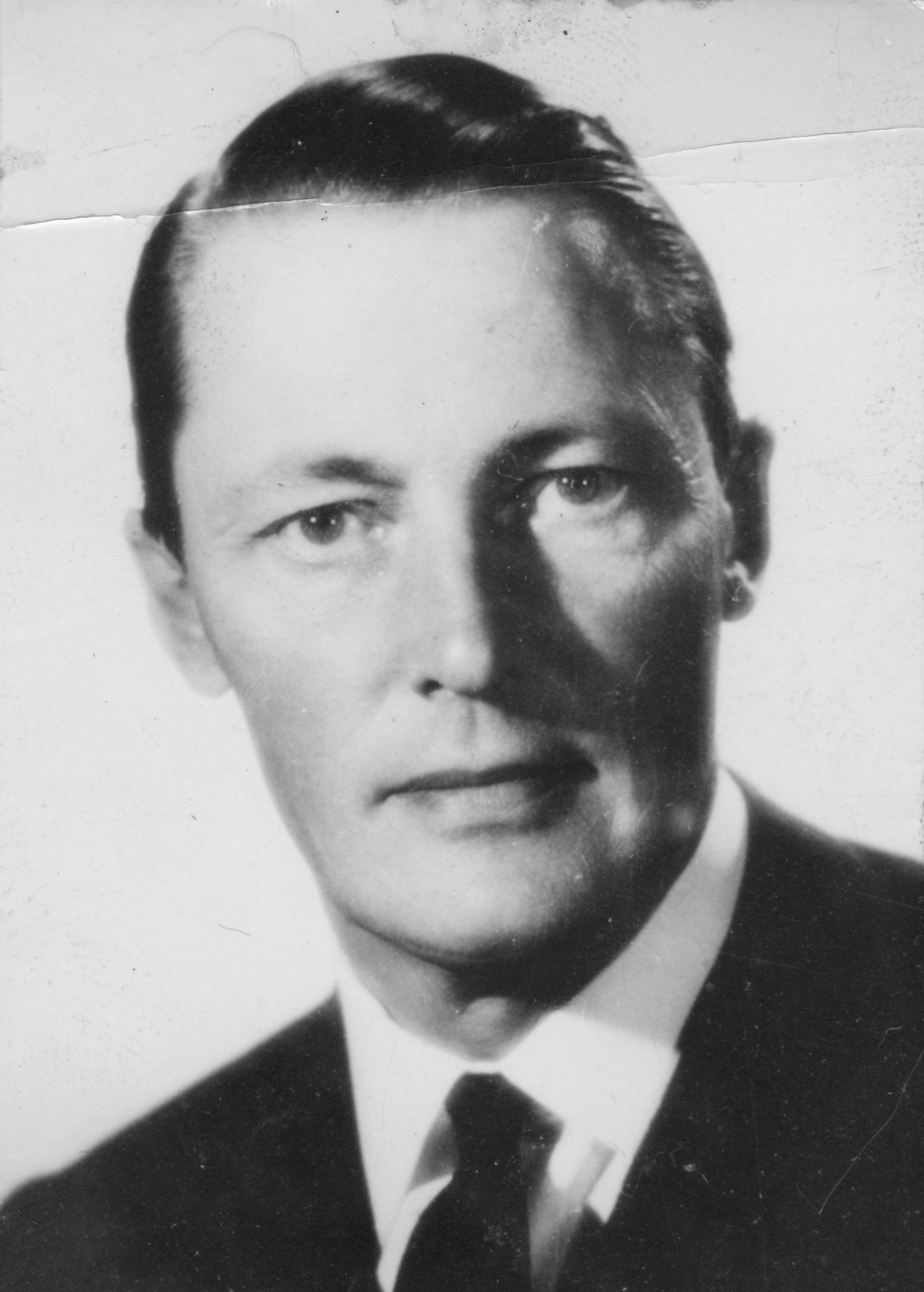
- Born: Claës-Henrik Bengtsson Nordenskiöld; 28 July 1917; Stockholm, Sweden
- Died: 11 November 2003 (aged 86)
- Burial place: Southern Cemetery, Kalmar
- Relatives: Bengt Nordenskiöld (father)
- Military career
- Allegiance: Sweden
- Branch: Swedish Air Force
- Service years: 1941–1970
- Rank: Major General
- Nickname: Kennen
- Commands: Scania Wing; Chief of the Air Staff; Chief of the Air Force (acting)

Major General Claës-Henrik Bengtsson (B:son) Nordenskiöld (28 July 1917 – 11 November 2003) was a Swedish Air Force officer and sailor. He was Chief of the Air Staff from 1966 to 1970 and Acting Chief of the Air Force in 1968.

== Early life ==
Nordenskiöld was born on 28 July 1917 in Stockholm, Sweden, the son of General Bengt Nordenskiöld and his wife Dagmar Werner. After passing studentexamen he enrolled at the Swedish Air Force Flying School where he finished first in his class.

== Career ==
Nordenskiöld was commissioned as an officer with the rank of second lieutenant in the Swedish Air Force in 1941. Nordenskiöld quickly made a career, first as squadron commander at Svea Wing (F 8). He was promoted to lieutenant in 1943 and served as deputy defense attaché in Washington, D.C. from 1943 to 1945 and was promoted to captain in 1948 and to major in 1953. Nordenskiöld also passed the staff course at the Royal Swedish Air Force Staff College. He was head of the Swedish Air Force Squadron Leader School (Flygvapnets bomb- och skjutskola) from 1954 to 1956 and was an expert of the 1955 Defense Preparation.

Nordenskiöld was head of the Operation Department of the Air Staff from 1956 to 1957 when he was promoted to lieutenant colonel. Nordenskiöld was then head of the Planning Department of the Air Staff from 1957 to 1958 and the Planning Department of the Defence Staff from 1958 to 1960 when he was promoted to colonel. Nordenskiöld was commanding officer of the Scania Wing (F 10) from 1960 to 1962. Nordenskiöld became colonel at the Defence Staff in 1962 and was also serving as chairman of the board of Gustaf Werner Group in Gothenburg from 1963. He was promoted to major general in 1966 and was then Chief of the Air Staff from 1966 to 1970 and acting Chief of Air Force in 1968. In 1970, he resigned in protest because of dissatisfaction with the reductions of the air force squadrons that the politicians had decided. Instead he became Special Assistant to the CEO of Saab-Scania AB in 1970.

== Personal life ==
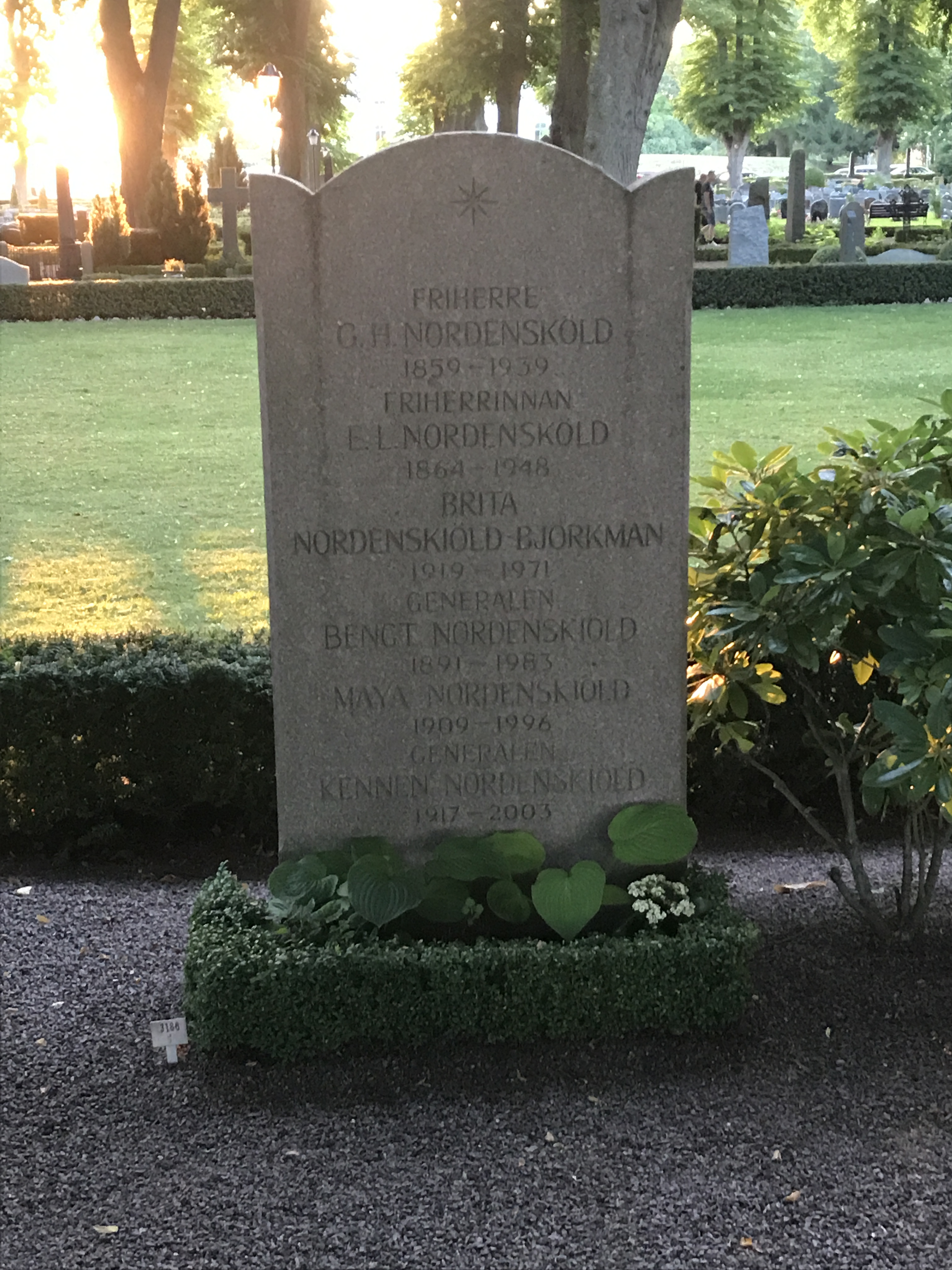
Gravesite of Major General Claës-Henrik Nordenskiöld at the Southern Cemetery in Kalmar.

He was married 1946–1975 to Maj Elvi Gunvor Dahlström (1912–1997), the daughter of manufacturer Dahlström and his wife. He was the father of Monica (born 1946) and Louise (born 1949). In 1975 he married Katarina von Kantzow (née Enell) (1931–1988), the daughter of colonel Harald Enell and Dagny (née Cornéer). In 1989 Nordenskiöld married Mariana von Beck (née Mörner).

After retirement, Nordenskiöld lived in San Pedro de Alcántara, Spain and later in Stockholm. Nordenskiöld was highly competitive and loved challenges, whether it was hunting, sailing or clay pigeon shooting, and he reached both Swedish championship class and a first prize at the 6 Metre World Cup in Newport Harbour, California. He was a member of the Royal Swedish Yacht Club since 1941.

== Death ==
Nordenskiöld died on 11 November 2003 and was buried on 4 June 2004 in the family grave at the Southern Cemetery (Södra kyrkogården) in Kalmar.

== Dates of rank ==
- 1941 – Second lieutenant
- 1943 – Lieutenant
- 1948 – Captain
- 1953 – Major
- 1957 – Lieutenant colonel
- 1960 – Colonel
- 1966 – Major general

== Awards and decorations ==
- (Sweden) King Gustaf V's Jubilee Commemorative Medal (1948)
- (Sweden) Commander 1st Class of the Order of the Sword (11 November 1966)

== Filmography ==
- Första divisionen (1941) - air force officer at the farewell dinner

Military offices
| Preceded by Wilhelm Wagner | Scania Wing; 1960–1962 | Succeeded by Ian Iacobi |
| Preceded by Gösta Odqvist | Chief of the Air Staff; 1966–1970 | Succeeded by Dick Stenberg |
| Preceded by Lage Thunberg | Chief of the Air Force (acting); 1968–1968 | Succeeded by Stig Norén |
