= Nils-Fredrik Palmstierna =

Swedish Air Force officer

Friherre Nils-Fredrik Palmstierna
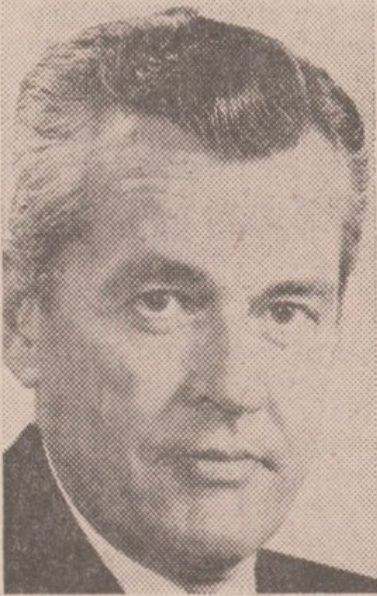
- Born: 8 March 1919; Eksjö, Sweden
- Died: 5 August 1990 (aged 71); Danderyd, Sweden
- Relatives: Anders Wall (son-in-law)
- Military career
- Allegiance: Sweden
- Branch: Swedish Air Force
- Service years: 1942–1984
- Rank: Major General
- Commands: Defence Staff's Planning Department; Svea Air Corps; Vice Chief of the Defence Staff; Chief of Staff, Eastern Military District; Swedish Armed Forces Staff College

Friherre Major General Nils-Fredrik Palmstierna (8 March 1919 – 5 August 1990) was a Swedish Air Force officer. His senior commands include the post of Vice Chief of the Defence Staff, Chief of Staff of the Eastern Military District and head of the Swedish Armed Forces Staff College.

== Early life ==
Palmstierna was born on 8 March 1919 in Eksjö Parish, Jönköping County, the son of Colonel, Friherre Henrik Palmstierna and his wife Inger (née Fåhræus). Palmstierna passed studentexamen in Skövde in 1939.

== Career ==
Palmstierna graduated from the Swedish Air Force Flying School (F 5) in Ljungbyhed and was commissioned as an officer at the Västgöta Wing (F 6) with the rank of second lieutenant. Palmstierna served as a flight instructor at the Swedish Air Force Flying School (F 5) from 1943 to 1946 and was promoted to lieutenant in 1944. He attended the Staff Course at the Royal Swedish Air Force Staff College in 1949 and was appointed captain the same year. From 1953 to 1955, he served as squadron commander at Halland Air Force Wing (Hallands flygflottilj, F 14).

From 1955 he served as Aide-de-camp to Prince Bertil, Duke of Halland and the same year he was promoted to major. He was posted as chief of staff of the 1st Air Command from 1955 to 1959 when he was promoted to lieutenant colonel, and the same year he studied at the Swedish National Defence College. He was then posted to the Defence Staff from 1960 to 1963 as head of the Planning Department during which time he served as an expert in the 1960 and the 1962 Defense Committees.

In 1963, Palmstierna was promoted to colonel and appointed commanding officer of Svea Air Corps (F 8). He was an expert in the 1965 Defense Investigation and in 1967, Palmstierna was appointed chief of Section 4 in the Defence Staff. Three years later, he assumed the position of Vice Chief of the Defence Staff and head of the Operations Command on 1 April 1970 and he was promoted to major general on 1 October the same year. Palmstierna was then chief of staff of the Eastern Military District from 1973 to 1978 and commanding officer of the Swedish Armed Forces Staff College from 1978 to 1984.

Palmstierna was chairman of the boards of the Military Literature Association (Militärlitteraturföreningen), Militärhistoriska Förlaget and the Military History Research Delegation (Delegationen för militärhistorisk forskning, DMF). He was also a member of the boards of directors of the HDF-bolagen in Halmstad, Stafsjö bruk and Starfors skogar.

== Personal life ==
In 1945, he married Louise Cavalli (born 1926), the daughter of colonel Evert Cavalli and Greta (née Berggren). They had two children: Charlotte Marie (born 1946), married in 1985 to Anders Wall, and Klas Henrik (born 1949), who was married 1974–1981 to Countess Ylva Catharina Egilsdotter von Rosen.

Palmstierna died on 5 August 1990 in Danderyd Parish in Danderyd Municipality, Stockholm County. He was buried in Djursholm Cemetery on 17 December 1990.

== Dates of rank ==
- 1942 – Second lieutenant
- 1944 – Lieutenant
- 1949 – Captain
- 1955 – Major
- 1959 – Lieutenant colonel
- 1963 – Colonel
- 1970 – Major general

== Awards and decorations ==
- (Sweden) Commanders 1st Class of the Order of the Sword (6 June 1970)
- (Sweden) Commander of the Order of the Sword (6 June 1967)
- (Sweden) Knight of the Order of the Sword (1960)
- (Sweden) Knight of the Order of Vasa (1965)

== Honours ==
- Member of the Royal Swedish Academy of War Sciences (1962)

Military offices
Preceded by Bengt Lundvall	Defence Staff's Planning Department; 1960–1963	Succeeded by ?
Preceded by Sven Uggla	Svea Air Corps; 1963–1967	Succeeded by Stig Bruse
Preceded by Dick Stenberg	Vice Chief of the Defence Staff; 1970–1973	Succeeded by Sven-Olof Olson
Preceded by Hans Neij	Chief of Staff of the Eastern Military District; 1973–1978	Succeeded by Erik G. Bengtsson
Preceded by Gustaf Peyron	Swedish Armed Forces Staff College; 1978–1984	Succeeded by Evert Båge
