= Dick Stenberg =

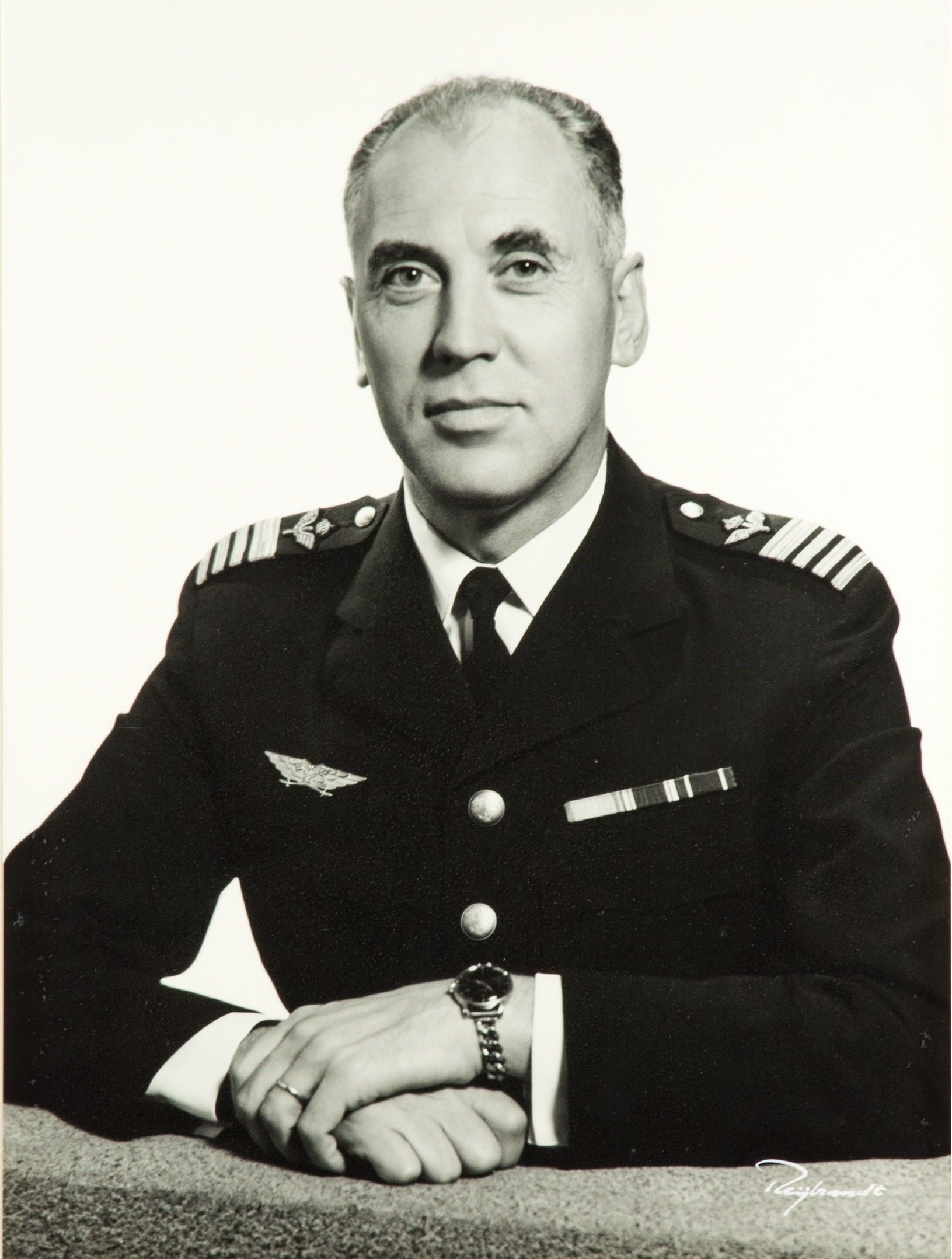
- Stenberg as colonel (1963–1968).
- Born: 21 January 1921; Falun, Sweden
- Died: 27 September 2004 (aged 83); Stockholm, Sweden
- Burial place: Bromma Cemetery
- Military career
- Allegiance: Sweden
- Branch: Swedish Air Force
- Service years: 1942–1982
- Rank: Lieutenant General
- Commands: Södertörn Wing; Chief of the Air Staff; Chief of the Air Force
- Conflicts: Congo Crisis

Lieutenant General Dick Stenberg (21 January 1921 – 27 September 2004) was a Swedish Air Force officer. Stenberg was commissioned as an officer in 1942 and was later the commanding officer of Södertörn Wing and Chief of the Air Staff. Stenberg ended his military career with the position of Chief of the Air Force from 1973 to 1982.

== Early life ==
Stenberg was born on 21 January 1921 in Falun, Sweden, the son of Karl Edvard Stenberg, a foreman, and his wife Karin (née Olofsson). He passed studentexamen at the Higher General Grammar School for Boys in Södermalm (Södra Latin) in Stockholm on 10 May 1939. Stenberg became an officer aspirant in the Swedish Air Force on 16 June 1939 and was commissioned as an officer with the rank of second lieutenant on 24 March 1942.

== Career ==
He was a flight instructor at the Swedish Air Force Flying School (F 5) from 1942 to 1948 and he was promoted to löjtnant on 14 April 1944. Stenberg underwent flight instructor courses at the Royal Air Force Flight Academy from 1944 to 1948 and was admitted to the Royal Swedish Air Force Staff College in Stockholm in 1948 and he was promoted to kapten on 1 April 1949. He was then a fighter pilot and was squadron leader at Svea Wing (F 8) from 1949 to 1954 and became major on 1 October 1954 and was head of the Aviation Department at Södertörn Wing (F 18) in 1955.

Stenberg became chief of staff of the Third Air Group (Tredje flygeskadern, E 3) on 1 May 1957 and was promoted to lieutenant colonel on 1 October 1958 and was appointed head of the Aviation and Air Defence Department at the Defence Staff on 1 April 1960. He was aviation commander of the 22 U.N. Fighter Squadron (F 22) in Congo during the Congo Crisis from November 1962 to April 1963. The core of the Swedish squadron consisted of 11 Saab 29 Tunnan. Stenberg co-operated there with Sven Lampell, his former classmate from Södra Latin. Back in Sweden, he was promoted to colonel and appointed commanding officer of Södertörn Wing on 1 April (took office on 1 May) 1963.

Stenberg was second vice chairman of the Swedish Officers Association from 1963 to 1965, and was appointed aviation inspector and head of the aviation section at the Eastern Military Dustrict Staff on 1 October 1966. He became Vice Chief of the Defence Staff on 1 October 1968, was promoted to major general on 1 November 1968 and was appointed Chief of the Air Staff on 1 April 1970. Stenberg was promoted to lieutenant general and was appointed Chief of the Air Force on 1 October 1973. During his time as Chief of the Air Force, he struggled with the problems surrounding Saab 37 Viggen's successor. Aircraft projects such as B3LA, A 20, Sk 2 and Flygplan 80 were discussed before a political decision of acquiring the Saab JAS 39 Gripen during Stenberg's last year as Chief of the Air Force. Stenberg retired on 30 September 1982.

== Other work ==
Stenberg was the chairman of the Foundation for the Swedish Air Force Museum from 1976 to 1991 and a member of the Military Management Advisory Board between 1 January 1979 and 1982 as well as a member of the Royal Swedish Academy of War Sciences in 1971 (president 1977-1979). In addition to his combat airplane training, Stenberg, during his time as the Chief of the Air Force, also took civilian air certificate. After his retirement in 1982, the Swedish Accident Investigation Authority hired him frequently for several years as a pilot in connection with various assignments in Sweden.

== Personal life ==
On 12 June 1943 in Sundbyberg he married Maj Gunborg Larsson (1921–2007), the daughter of tram driver Sven Erik Larsson and Ida Sofia Lindström. He was the father of Jan (born 1944) and Eva (born 1947).

== Death ==
Stenberg died on 27 September 2004 in Bromma Parish, Stockholm and was buried on 2 November 2004 at Bromma Cemetery.

== Dates of rank ==
- 1942 – Second lieutenant
- 1944 – Lieutenant
- 1949 – Captain
- 1954 – Major
- 1958 – Lieutenant colonel
- 1963 – Colonel
- 1968 – Major general
- 1973 – Lieutenant general

== Awards and decorations ==
- (Sweden) Commander of the Order of the Sword (11 November 1966)
- (Iceland) Knight's Cross of the Order of the Falcon (1 April 1954)
- United Nations Medal

Military offices
Preceded by Erik Raab	Södertörn Wing; 1963–1966	Succeeded by Sven Alm
Preceded by Bo Westin	Vice Chief of the Defence Staff; 1968–1970	Succeeded by Nils-Fredrik Palmstierna
Preceded by Claës-Henrik Nordenskiöld	Chief of the Air Staff; 1970–1973	Succeeded by Hans Neij
Preceded by Stig Norén	Chief of the Air Force; 1973–1982	Succeeded by Sven-Olof Olson
Professional and academic associations
Preceded by Ove Ljung	President of the Royal Swedish Academy of War Sciences; 1977–1979	Succeeded by Gunnar Thyresson
