= Evert Båge =

Swedish air force major-general (1925–2021)

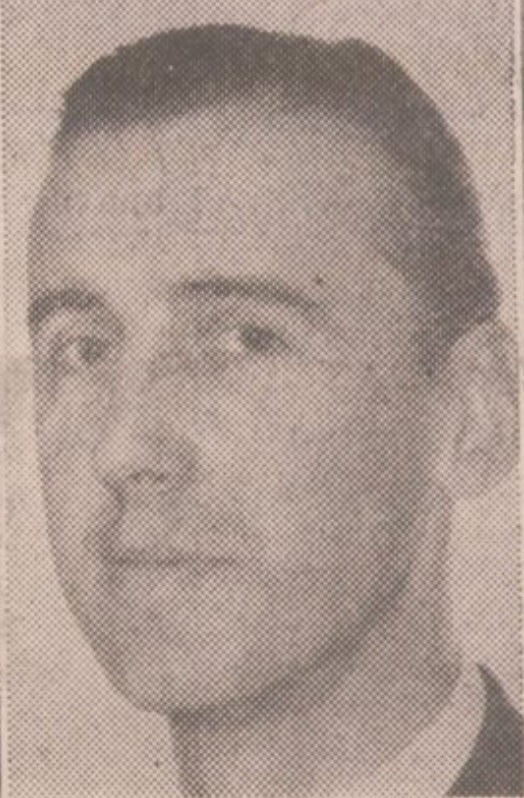
- Båge in the mid-1960s
- Born: Evert Karl Erik Båge; 25 August 1925; Alingsås, Sweden
- Died: 21 January 2021 (aged 95); Arild, Sweden
- Military career
- Allegiance: Sweden
- Branch: Swedish Air Force
- Service years: 1948–1990
- Rank: Major General
- Commands: Jämtland Wing; Operations Command 2, Defence Staff; Chief of Staff, Milo ÖN; Chief of the Air Staff; Swedish Armed Forces Staff College

Major General Evert Karl Erik Båge (25 August 1925 – 21 January 2021) was a Swedish Air Force officer. Båge served as Chief of the Air Staff from 1980 to 1984 and as head of the Swedish Armed Forces Staff College from 1984 to 1990.

== Early life ==
Båge was born on 25 August 1925 in Alingsås Parish, Älvsborg County, Sweden, the son of Erik Båge, a repairer, and his wife Selma. Båge passed studentexamen in 1945.

== Career ==
Båge graduated from the Swedish Air Force Flying School in 1948 and was commissioned as a second lieutenant in Svea Wing. Båge served there from 1948 to 1958 and he was promoted to lieutenant in 1950. In September 1950, he made news after flying the Gothenburg-Stockholm route in a de Havilland Vampire, in a time of 29 minutes, 22 seconds, including takeoff and landing. In 1958, Båge was promoted to captain, whereupon he served in the Third Air Group (Tredje flygeskadern, E 3) and Air Staff from 1958 to 1963. He was promoted to major in 1962. He was head of Operation Command I in the Defence Staff from 1963 to 1966, and was promoted to lieutenant colonel in 1965 and was head of Section 1 of the staff of the Eastern Military District from 1966 to 1968.

In 1969, he was promoted to colonel, after which he was commander of Jämtland Wing from 1969 to 1973. In September 1970, he had his appointment extended until further notice as acting commander of Jämtland Wing. He was promoted to senior colonel on 1 October 1974 after which he served as head of Operations Command 2 in the Defence Staff from 1973 to 1978. On 1 October 1978, Båge was promoted to major general and assumed the position of chief of staff of the Upper Norrland Military District. He then served as Chief of the Air Staff from 1980 to 1984 and head of the Swedish Armed Forces Staff College from 1984 to 1990. When Båge (Class of 1945) retired in the autumn of 1990, with 45 years and 4 months he was the person who served the longest in the Sweden Air Force.

== Personal life ==
In 1948, Båge married Gunnel Brandt (born 1925). Their daughter was born on 30 July 1952 at Karolinska Hospital in Stockholm. Their second daughter was born on 26 January 1958 in Ward 6 at Karolinska Hospital.

== Death ==
Båge died on 21 January 2021 in Arild, Sweden. The funeral service was held in Brunnby Church.

== Dates of rank ==
- 1948 – Second lieutenant
- 1950 – Lieutenant
- 1958 – Captain
- 1962 – Major
- 1965 – Lieutenant colonel
- 1969 – Colonel
- 1 October 1974 – Senior colonel
- 1 October 1978 – Major general

== Awards and decorations ==
- (Sweden) Commander 1st Class of the Order of the Sword (3 December 1974)
- (Sweden) Commander of the Order of the Sword (11 November 1972)
- (Sweden) Knight 1st Class of the Order of the Sword (1965)
- (Iceland) Grand Knight's Cross with Star of the Order of the Falcon (26 October 1981)

== Honours ==
- Member of the Royal Swedish Academy of War Sciences (1981)

Military offices
Preceded by Per Rudberg	Defence Staff's Operations Command 2; 1973–1978	Succeeded by ?
Preceded by Erik Nygren	Chief of Staff of the Upper Norrland Military District; 1978–1980	Succeeded by Bertil Nordström
Preceded by Erik Nygren	Chief of the Air Staff; 1 October 1980–1984	Succeeded by Bengt Lönnbom
Preceded by Nils-Fredrik Palmstierna	Swedish Armed Forces Staff College; 1984–1990	Succeeded by Claes Tornberg
