= Nils Personne =

Swedish Air Force officer

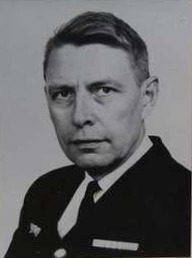
- Born: Nils Birger Valdemar Personne; 29 June 1918; Örebro, Sweden
- Died: 26 August 2013 (aged 95); Nyköping, Sweden
- Burial place: Galärvarvskyrkogården, Stockholm
- Military career
- Allegiance: Sweden
- Branch: Swedish Air Force
- Service years: 1940–1980
- Rank: Lieutenant General
- Commands: Södermanland Wing; Section 2, Air Staff; Vice Chief of the Air Staff; 4th Air Group; Chief of Staff, Milo ÖN; CO, Milo ÖN; CO, Milo V

Lieutenant General Nils Birger Valdemar Personne (29 June 1918 – 26 August 2013) was a Swedish Air Force officer and military commander. Commissioned in 1940, he served in a wide range of operational, staff and command appointments over a four-decade career. After flying bomber aircraft during World War II, he held instructional and staff positions in the Air Staff and at the Royal Swedish Air Force Staff College before commanding the Södermanland Wing (F 11). He later served as Vice Chief of the Air Staff (1961–1966), commander of the 4th Air Group (1966), chief of staff of the Upper Norrland Military District (1966–1972), and Commanding General of the Upper Norrland Military District (1972–1976) and the Western Military District (1976–1980). A pilot who flew 33 different aircraft types during his career, Personne also remained active in Swedish aviation history after his retirement.

== Early life ==
Personne was born on 29 June 1918 in Örebro, Sweden, (Note: Personne was born on 29 June 1918 in Örebro Southern Parish (Örebro södra församling) in Örebro County but was registered in Hudiksvall Parish in Hudiksvall, Gävleborg County.) the son of Birger Personne, a high school principal, and his wife Rut Eriksson. In the autumn of 1936, Personne began to think about the future and in that context it was a friend who suggested that he should apply to the Swedish Air Force, which he also did. Alarmingly poor blood pressure values at the medical examination in connection with the admission tests could have put a stop to continued flight plans. An understanding doctor, however, had Personne repeat the test the next day, when the traces of a "proper" graduation party disappeared from the body. Once at the Swedish Air Force Flying School in Ljungbyhed, Personne flew the Sk 12 and passed training. For a time they were stationed in Trollhättan and flew over the Skagerrak and Kattegat in a 4.5-hour pass over the sea, and witnessed, among other things, how the Gertrud Bratt was sunk by the German submarine U-4 with two torpedoes on 24 September 1939. Personne graduated first in his class at the officer candidate school, first in the cadet school and second at the Swedish Air Force Flying School.

== Career ==
Personne was commissioned as an officer in the Swedish Air Force on 20 April 1940 with the rank of second lieutenant. Personne served within the Västmanland Wing (F 1) from 1940 to 1945, flying the B 3. He was promoted to lieutenant in 1942. He attended the higher course at the Royal Swedish Air Force Staff College from 1945 to 1947 when he was promoted to captain and was posted to the Organizational Department in the Air Staff the same year. Personne was promoted to major in 1951 and served as a teacher at the Royal Swedish Air Force Staff College from 1951 to 1955. In 1953 he was severely affected by that year's polio epidemic. Personne had been one of the 800 in Stockholm who were affected by the last epidemic but nevertheless managed to return as a pilot after just over a year of rehabilitation.

In 1955, Personne attended the Swedish National Defence College and the year after he was promoted to lieutenant colonel. He then served in the Swedish National Defence College from 1956 to 1959 when he was promoted to colonel and appointed commander of the Södermanland Wing (F 11) in Nyköping. Two years later, Personne was appointed head of Section 2 in the Air Staff and Vice Chief of the Air Staff and in 1966 he became commander of the 4th Air Group (Fjärde flygeskadern, E 4). The unit was disbanded the same year and Personne was appointed chief of staff in the Upper Norrland Military District with the rank of major general. He served in this position for 6 years before being promoted to lieutenant general and appointed military commander of the Upper Norrland Military District in 1972. He then served as military commander of the Western Military District in Skövde from 1976 until he left active service in 1980. In total, during his time in the Swedish Air Force, Personne flew 33 types of aircraft, versions not counted. He also flew three types of helicopters and gliders.

== Later life ==
After his retirement from the military, Personne worked for Nyge Aero in Nyköping from 1981 to 1988, to build the target towing for the Swedish Armed Forces. He was one of the initiators of creating F11's aviation museum in Nyköping. Personne was also chairman of the Swedish Aviation Historical Society (Svensk flyghistorisk förening, SFF) for four years and was one of the initiators of the formation of Nyköping's Aviation History Association (NFF) and was the association's first chairman.

== Personal life ==
In 1943, he married Karin Tengstrand (1920–2018). They had two children: Anders (born 1945) and Bo (born 1949).

Personne was a member of the Rotary International.

== Death ==
Personne died on 26 August 2013 in Nyköping Saint Nicholas Parish in Nyköping, Södermanland County. He was interred at Galärvarvskyrkogården in Stockholm on 13 November 2013.

== Dates of rank ==
- 1940 – Second Lieutenant
- 1942 – Lieutenant
- 1947 – Captain
- 1951 – Major
- 1956 – Lieutenant Colonel
- 1959 – Colonel
- 1966 – Major General
- 1972 – Lieutenant General

== Awards and decorations ==
- (Sweden) Commander Grand Cross of the Order of the Sword (6 June 1973)
- (Sweden) Commander 1st Class of the Order of the Sword (6 June 1966)
- (Sweden) Commander of the Order of the Sword (6 June 1964)
- (Sweden) Knight 1st Class of the Order of the Sword (1952)
- (Sweden) Swedish Women's Voluntary Defence Organization Royal Medal of Merit in silver
- (Sweden) Swedish Central Federation for Voluntary Military Training Medal of Merit in silver

== Honours ==
- Member of the Royal Swedish Academy of War Sciences (1963)

== Footnotes ==
Military offices
Preceded by Henrik Nordström	Södermanland Wing; 1959–1961	Succeeded by Bo Lindgren
Preceded by Gösta Odqvist	Vice Chief of the Air Staff; 1961–1966	Succeeded by None
Preceded by Åke Mangård	4th Air Group; 1966–1966	Succeeded by None
Preceded by Bele Jansson	Chief of Staff of the Upper Norrland Military District; 1966–1972	Succeeded by Gösta Hökmark
Preceded by Arne Mohlin	Commanding General, Upper Norrland Military District; 1972–1976	Succeeded by Karl-Gösta Lundmark
Preceded by Lennart Ljung as Acting	Commanding General, Western Military District; 1976–1980	Succeeded by Kjell Nordström
