= Greger Falk =

Swedish Air Force officer

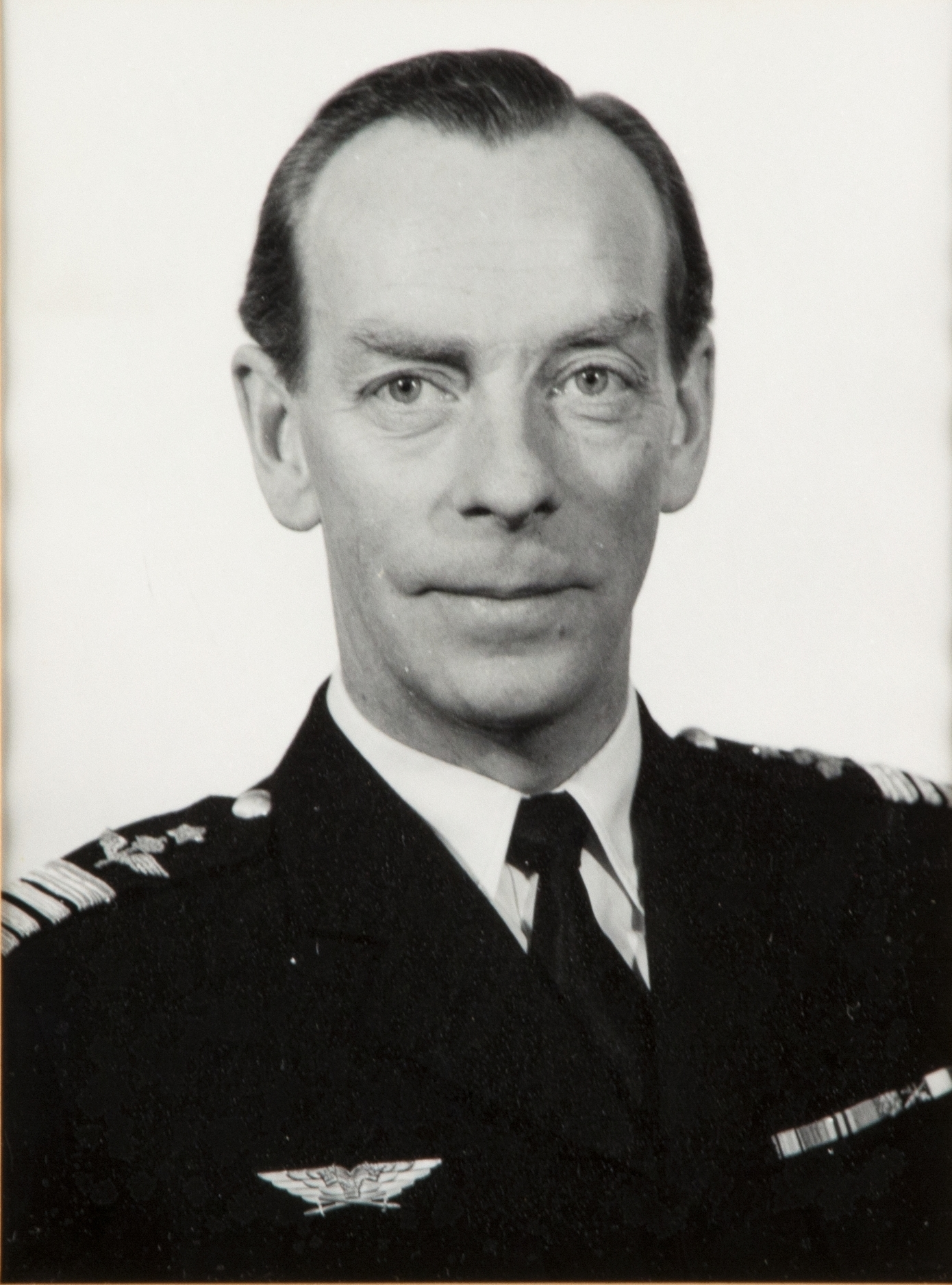
- Falk as colonel (circa 1953–57)
- Born: Kurt Bengt Greger Fredrik H:son Falk; 13 March 1910; Visby, Sweden
- Died: 20 January 1990 (aged 76); Djursholm, Sweden
- Military career
- Allegiance: Sweden
- Branch: Swedish Air Force
- Service years: 1931–1967
- Rank: Major General
- Commands: Södermanland Wing; Vice Chief of the Air Staff; Inspector of the Control and Reporting System; Fourth Air Group; Royal Swedish Air Force Materiel Administration
- Conflicts: Winter War

Major General Kurt Bengt Greger Fredrik H:son Falk (13 March 1910 – 20 January 1990) was a Swedish Air Force officer. His senior commands include positions as the Inspector of the Control and Reporting System (1953–1957), the Vice Chief of the Air Staff (1951–1953), commanding officer of the Fourth Air Group (1957–1961), as well as Vice Chief and then Chief of the Royal Swedish Air Force Materiel Administration (1961–1967).

== Early life ==
Falk was born on 13 March 1910 in Visby, Sweden, the son of Major General Hjalmar Falk and his wife Kerstin Söderberg. He had one sister, Sonja Anne-Louise (born 13 August 1911). He passed studentexamen in Stockholm in 1928.

== Career ==
Falk was commissioned as an officer in 1931 and was assigned as a second lieutenant to Norrbotten Regiment in Boden. He transferred to the Swedish Air Force where he became a lieutenant in 1936, and captain in 1940. During 1939–1940, Falk participated as a volunteer soldier in the Swedish Voluntary Air Force (F 19) at the Salla Front in Finland during the Winter War. Falk attended the Royal Swedish Air Force Staff College in 1943, and served as teacher in the art of air warfare at the Royal Swedish Army Staff College in 1943, and was promoted to major in 1944. He was appointed head of the Organisation Department in the Air Staff in 1944.

Falk was promoted to lieutenant colonel in 1947 and was appointed commanding officer of the Södermanland Wing in 1949. He was promoted to colonel in 1951 and served as Vice Chief of the Air Staff in 1951. Falk was appointed Inspector of the Control and Reporting System of the Swedish Air Force in 1953 and attended the Swedish National Defence College in 1954. He was commanding officer of the Fourth Air Group (Fjärde flygeskadern, E 4) in 1957, attended the Swedish National Defence College in 1959, and was promoted to major general in 1959. He served as Vice Chief of the Royal Swedish Air Force Materiel Administration from 1961 to 1963 and as chief of the same from 1963 to 1967. In his capacity as Vice Chief and Chief of the Royal Swedish Air Force Materiel Administration, he was a member of the Administration Board of the Swedish Armed Forces from 1961 to 1967.

Falk served as military adviser at the Instituut voor Tuinbouwtechniek, the Netherlands from 1967, as board member of the Swedish National Defence Research Institute and National Aeronautical Research Institute from 1961 to 1967. After Falk retired from the air force, he worked as a consultant for Standard Radio & Telefon AB from 1967 to 1975.

== Personal life ==
In 1936, Falk married Margit Holmberg (1917–1994), the daughter of factory manager Harald Holmberg and Annie (née Wersén). They had two children: Monica (born 1938) and Ingela (born 1942).

== Death ==
Falk died on 20 January 1990 in Djursholm, Sweden, and was interred at Djursholm Cemetery in Djursholm.

== Dates of rank ==
- 1931 – Second lieutenant
- 1936 – Lieutenant
- 1940 – Captain
- 1944 – Major
- 1947 – Lieutenant colonel
- 1951 – Colonel
- 1959 – Major general

== Awards and decorations ==
=== Swedish ===
- (Sweden) Commander 1st Class of the Order of the Sword (6 June 1957)
- (Sweden) Commander of the Order of the Sword (5 June 1954)
- (Sweden) Knight of the Order of the Sword (1946)
- (Sweden) Knight of the Order of Vasa (1948)

=== Foreign ===
- (Denmark) Knight of the Order of the Dannebrog
- (Finland) 4th Class of the Order of the Cross of Liberty with swords

== Honours ==
- Member of the Royal Swedish Academy of War Sciences (1952)

== Bibliography ==
- Falk, Greger; Bruun, C-E; Temmes, K J (1988). "En krönika om F19: den svenska frivilliga flygflottiljen i Finland under vinterkriget 1939-1940". Flyghistorisk revy (in Swedish) (33). Stockholm: Svensk flyghistorisk fören. ISSN 0345-3413. SELIBR 8212840.

Military offices
Preceded by Torsten Rapp	Vice Chief of the Air Staff; 1951–1953	Succeeded by Stig Möller
Preceded by Birger Schyberg	Inspector of the Control and Reporting System; 1953–1957	Succeeded by Stig Norén
Preceded by Ingvar Berg	Fourth Air Group; 1957–1961	Succeeded by Gösta Odqvist
Preceded by Lage Thunberg	Vice Chief and Chief of the Royal Swedish Air Force Materiel Administration; 1961–1967	Succeeded by None
