= Bengt Lönnbom =

Swedish Air Force officer (1933–2024)

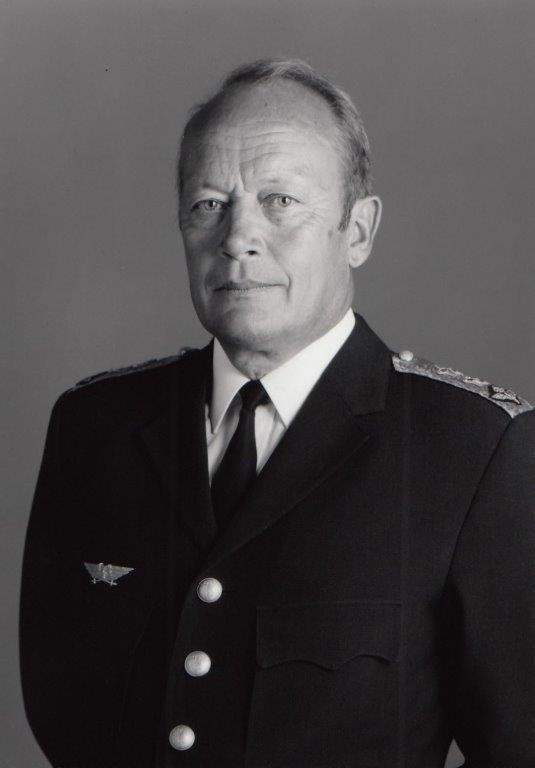
- Born: Bengt Arne Vilhelm Lönnbom; 22 July 1933; Lund, Sweden
- Died: 8 August 2024 (aged 91); Sollentuna, Sweden
- Military career
- Allegiance: Sweden
- Branch: Swedish Air Force
- Service years: 1956–1993
- Rank: Major General
- Commands: Chief of the Air Staff; Milo NN
- Awards: Knight of the Order of the Sword

Major General Bengt Arne Vilhelm Lönnbom (22 July 1933 – 8 August 2024) was a Swedish Air Force officer. Lönnbom served as Chief of the Air Staff from 1984 to 1987 and as military commander of the Lower Norrland Military District from 1987 to 1993.

== Early life ==
Lönnbom was born on 22 July 1933 in Lund's City Parish (Lunds stadsförsamling) in Malmöhus County, Sweden.

== Career ==
=== Military career ===
Lönnbom graduated from the Swedish Air Force Flying School in 1956 and was commissioned as an officer the same year at Scania Wing with the rank of second lieutenant, where he served from 1956 to 1967, including as division commander. He was promoted to lieutenant in 1958 and to captain in 1964. Lönnbom served as head of the office in the Department of Studies in the Defence Staff from 1967 to 1968 and he was promoted to major in 1969. He then served in the Planning Department in the Air Staff from 1971 to 1972 and was promoted to lieutenant colonel in 1972. Lönnbom served in the Planning and Budget Department at the Ministry of Defence from 1972 to 1975 and was head of the office in the Planning Department in the Air Staff from 1975 to 1977.

In 1977, Lönnbom was promoted to colonel, whereupon from 1977 to 1979 he was deputy commander of Bråvalla Wing in Norrköping. After promotion to senior colonel in 1979, he was head of the Aviation Section in the staff of the Upper Norrland Military District from 1979 to 1981. From 1981 to 1982, Lönnbom served as head of the Chief of the Air Force's project group for JAS and from 1982 to 1984 as head of the Systems Department in the Main Department for Aircraft Equipment in the Defence Materiel Administration. Lönnbom was promoted to major general on 1 April 1984 and appointed Chief of the Air Staff from the same date. On 1 November 1987, Lönnbom assumed the position of military commander of Lower Norrland Military District. He became the last holder of this post, serving until 1993.

=== Business career ===
Lönnbom was chairman of the board of Polydisplay AB and chairman of the Swedish part of AFCEA. In 1991 he became CEO of Carubel AB. He became chairman of the board in 2001.

== Death ==
Lönnbom died on 8 August 2024.

== Dates of rank ==
- 1956 – Second Lieutenant
- 1958 – Lieutenant
- 1964 – Captain
- 1969 – Major
- 1972 – Lieutenant colonel
- 1977 – Colonel
- 1979 – Senior colonel
- 1 April 1984 – Major general

== Honours ==
- Member of the Royal Swedish Academy of War Sciences (1980)

== Bibliography ==
- Wickbom, Jan; Lönnbom, Bengt; Gröning, Lotta (2006). Försvara Sverige bättre!: ny strategi för 2000-talet (in Swedish). Stocksund: Ulf Wickbom Media. SELIBR 10376188.
- Wickbom, Jan; Lönnbom, Bengt (2009). Försvara Sverige på nytt! (in Swedish). Stockholm: Ulf Wickbom Media. SELIBR 11366692.

Military offices
Preceded by Evert Båge	Chief of the Air Staff; 1984–1987	Succeeded by Bert Stenfeldt
Preceded by Rolf Wigur	Lower Norrland Military District; 1987–1993	Succeeded by None
