= Chief of the Air Staff (Sweden) =

- Chefen för flygstaben
- Incumbent; Colonel Niclas Magnusson since 1 March 2025
- Ministry of Defence
- Type: Chief of the Air Staff
- Abbreviation: CFS
- Reports to: Chief of Air Force
- Seat: Banérgatan 62-64, Stockholm (1943–1981); Lidingövägen 24, Stockholm (1981–1994); Ärna Air Base (2019–)
- Term length: No fixed term
- Formation: 1936, 2019
- First holder: Lieutenant Colonel Bengt Nordenskiöld (1936); Colonel Anders Persson (2019)
- Final holder: Major General Bernt Östh
- Abolished: 1994
- Unofficial names: Flygstabschef
- Deputy: Vice Chief of the Air Staff (1943–1966)

The Chief of the Air Staff (Swedish: Chefen för flygstaben, CFS, or Flygstabschef) is the professional head of the Swedish Air Staff. The post was created in 1936 with lieutenant colonel Bengt Nordenskiöld as the first incumbent. The post disappeared in 1994 and was reintroduced in 2019 when the new Air Staff was established.

== History ==
The Chief of the Air Staff was from 1936 to 1994 the second most senior member of the Swedish Air Force after the Chief of the Air Force and headed the Air Staff. The position was initially held by a colonel (1937–1943) and later by a major general (1943–1994). When the Air Staff was disbanded in 1994, the office was eliminated. In 2019, the Air Staff was re-established and a Chief of the Air Staff was appointed again, this time held by a colonel.

Between 1943 and 1966, the post of Vice Chief of the Air Staff existed. According to the rules of procedure for the Air Staff issued on 1 March 1962, the Vice Chief of the Air Staff (and the Inspector of the Control and Reporting System and the Inspector of the Flying Safety Service) were given responsibility for various departments and other organizational units within the Air Staff's areas of activity so that these executives in effect subsequently served as section heads.

== Chiefs of the Air Staff ==
=== Chiefs of the Air Staff (1936–1994) ===
No.	Portrait	Chief of the Air Staff	Took office	Left office	Time in office	Chief of the Air Force	Ref.
1	Bengt Nordenskiöld	Colonel (Note: Nordenskiöld was lieutenant colonel when taking office on 1 July 1936 and was promoted to colonel on 1 July 1937 while still in office.); Bengt Nordenskiöld (1891–1983)	1 July 1936	1942	5–6 years	Torsten Friis	
2	Axel Ljungdahl	Major general (Note: Ljungdahl was colonel when taking office in 1942 and was promoted to major general in 1943 while still in office.); Axel Ljungdahl (1897–1995)	1942	1947	4–5 years	Bengt Nordenskiöld	-
3	Gustaf Adolf Westring	Major general (Note: Westring was colonel when taking office in 1947 and was promoted to major general in 1950 while still in office.); Gustaf Adolf Westring (1900–1963)	1947	1957	9–10 years	Bengt Nordenskiöld; Axel Ljungdahl	-
4	Lennart Peyron	Major general Lennart Peyron (1909–1981)	1957	1960	2–3 years	Axel Ljungdahl	-
5	Stig Norén	Major general Stig Norén (1908–1996)	1960	1964	3–4 years	Torsten Rapp; Lage Thunberg	-
6	Gösta Odqvist	Major general Gösta Odqvist (1913–2005)	1964	1966	1–2 years	Lage Thunberg	-
7	Claës-Henrik Nordenskiöld	Major general Claës-Henrik Nordenskiöld (1917–2003)	1966	1970	3–4 years	Lage Thunberg; Stig Norén	-
8	Dick Stenberg	Major general Dick Stenberg (1921–2004)	1 April 1970	30 September 1973	3 years, 182 days	Stig Norén	
9	Hans Neij	Major general Hans Neij (1921–1985)	1973	30 September 1978	4–5 years	Dick Stenberg	
10	Erik Nygren	Major general Erik Nygren (1923–1999)	1 October 1978	30 September 1980	1 year, 365 days	Dick Stenberg	
11	Evert Båge	Major general Evert Båge (1925–2021)	1 October 1980	30 September 1984	3 years, 182 days	Dick Stenberg; Sven-Olof Olson	
12	Bengt Lönnbom	Major general Bengt Lönnbom (1933–2024)	1 April 1984	1987	2–3 years	Sven-Olof Olson	
13	Bert Stenfeldt	Major general Bert Stenfeldt (1933–2023)	1987	30 September 1990	2–3 years	Sven-Olof Olson; Lars-Erik Englund	
14	Bernt Östh	Major general Bernt Östh (born 1936)	1 October 1990	1994	3–4 years	Lars-Erik Englund	
-	Kjell Nilsson	Senior colonel Kjell Nilsson (1943–2018); Acting	1993	1994	0–1 years	Lars-Erik Englund	-

=== Chiefs of the Air Staff (2019–present) ===
No.	Portrait	Chief of the Air Staff	Took office	Left office	Time in office	Chief of Air Force	Ref.
1	Anders Persson	Colonel; Anders Persson (born 1968)	1 January 2019	30 September 2019	272 days	Mats Helgesson	
2	Anders Jönsson	Colonel; Anders Jönsson (born ?)	1 October 2019	31 May 2020	243 days	Carl-Johan Edström	
3	Dennis Hedström	Colonel; Dennis Hedström (born ?)	1 June 2020	28 February 2025	3 years, 272 days	Carl-Johan Edström; Jonas Wikman	
4	Niclas Magnusson	Colonel; Niclas Magnusson (born ?)	1 March 2025	31 March 2028	3 years, 30 days	Jonas Wikman	

== Vice Chiefs of the Air Staff ==
No.	Portrait	Vice/Deputy Chief of the Air Staff	Took office	Left office	Time in office	Chiefs of the Air Staff	Ref.
1	Karl Silfverberg	Colonel; Karl Silfverberg (1899–1978)	1943	1948	4–5 years	Axel Ljungdahl; Gustaf Adolf Westring	-
2	Torsten Rapp	Colonel; Torsten Rapp (1905–1993)	1 October 1948	1951	2–3 years	Gustaf Adolf Westring	
3	Greger Falk	Colonel; Greger Falk (1910–1990)	1951	1953	1–2 years	Gustaf Adolf Westring	-
4	Stig Möller	Colonel; Stig Möller (1911–2002)	1953	1959	5–6 years	Gustaf Adolf Westring; Lennart Peyron	-
5	Gösta Odqvist	Colonel; Gösta Odqvist (1913–2005)	1959	1961	1–2 years	Lennart Peyron; Stig Norén	-
6	Nils Personne	Colonel; Nils Personne (1918–2013)	1961	1966	4–5 years	Stig Norén; Gösta Odqvist	-
