= Bernt Östh =

Swedish Air Force officer

- Born: Bernt Nils Sune Östh; 20 December 1936 (age 89); Värnamo, Sweden
- Military career
- Allegiance: Sweden
- Branch: Swedish Air Force
- Service years: 1959–1997
- Rank: Major General
- Commands: Swedish Air Force Tactical Command School; Flygvapnets Södertörnsskolor; Chief of Staff, Milo B; Chief of the Air Staff; Chief of the Joint Staff, SAFHQ

Major General Bernt Nils Sune Östh (born 20 December 1936) was a Swedish Air Force officer. Östh served as Chief of the Air Staff from 1990 to 1994 and as chief of the Joint Staff (Gemensamma staben) at the Swedish Armed Forces Headquarters from 1994 to 1997.

== Early life ==
Östh was born on 20 December 1936 in Värnamo Parish, Jönköping County, Sweden, the son of Martin Östh and his wife Astrid (née Willstrand). He passed studentexamen in 1956.

== Career ==
Östh was commissioned as an officer in the Swedish Air Force in 1959 with the rank of second lieutenant. He served as a combat control officer at Norrbotten Wing (F 21) from 1959 to 1964 and was promoted to lieutenant in 1961, and served in the Air Staff from 1964 to 1965. Östh attended the Stridsledningslinjen ("Combat Control Program") at the Swedish Armed Forces Staff College from 1966 to 1968 and was promoted to captain in 1967. He was then posted to the Operations Command 3 in the Defence Staff from 1969 to 1972 when he was promoted to major. Östh was promoted to lieutenant colonel in 1972 and was posted to the Swedish Armed Forces Staff College as a teacher of strategy between 1972 and 1975, and he served in Flygvapnets Södertörnsskolor (F 18) from 1975 to 1977, as head of the Swedish Air Force Tactical Command School (Flygvapnets stridsledningsskola, StrilS).

He was head of the Operations Department in the Air Staff from 1977 to 1980 when he was promoted to colonel. In 1979, Östh attended the Swedish National Defence College. He was then head of the Study and Research Coordination in the Central Planning Unit (Enheten för centralplanering) at the Defence Materiel Administration from 1980 to 1981 and from 1981 to 1984 he served as commanding officer of Flygvapnets Södertörnsskolor (F 18). Östh attended the Swedish National Defence College in 1984. On 1 April 1984, Östh was promoted to senior colonel and was appointed head of the Planning Section 3 (Planeringssektion 3) in the Defence Staff. He then served as Chief of Staff of Bergslagen Military District from 1989 to 1990. He was promoted to major general and appointed Chief of the Air Staff from 1 October 1990. Östh served in this position until 1994. His assumed the position of Chief of the Joint Staff (Gemensamma staben) at the Swedish Armed Forces Headquarters on 1 July 1994. He served in this position until 1997.

Östh served as the last Chief of the Air Staff before the Air Staff was disbanded in 1994. On 16 January 2019, Östh was present and gave a speech at the inauguration of the new Air Staff.

== Personal life ==
In 1961, Östh married Margaretha Johansson (born 1936), the daughter of Birger Johansson and Wendela (née Lundberg).

== Dates of rank ==
- 1959 – Second lieutenant
- 1961 – Lieutenant
- 1967 – Captain
- 1972 – Major
- 1972 – Lieutenant colonel
- 1980 – Colonel
- 1 April 1984 – Senior colonel
- 1 October 1990 – Major general

== Awards and decorations ==
- (Sweden) Swedish Air Force Volunteers Association Medal of Merit in silver (1988)

== Honours ==
- Member of the Royal Swedish Academy of War Sciences (1984)

Military offices
Preceded by Lars-Olof Strandberg	Chief of Staff of Bergslagen Military District; 1989–1990	Succeeded by ?
Preceded by Bert Stenfeldt	Chief of the Air Staff; 1990–1994	Succeeded by Kjell Nilsson
Preceded by None	Chief of the Joint Staff, SAFHQ; 1994–1997	Succeeded by Curt Westberg
