= Gustaf Adolf Westring =

Swedish Air Force General

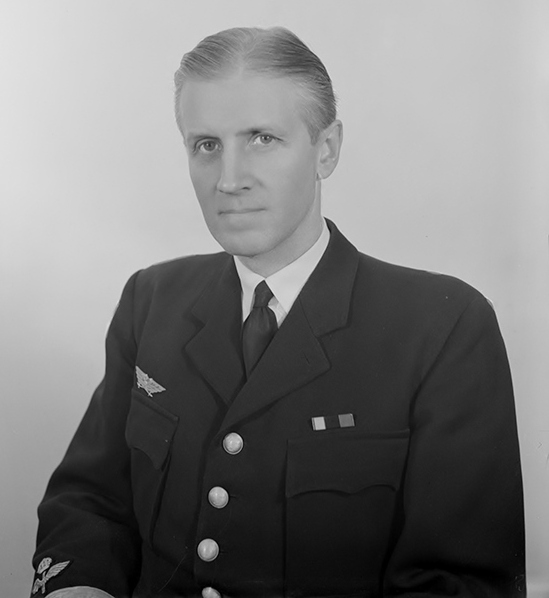
- Born: 2 September 1900; Stockholm, Sweden
- Died: 15 March 1963 (aged 62); Chachacomani, Bolivia
- Relatives: Claes Westring (brother)
- Military career
- Allegiance: Sweden
- Branch: Swedish Air Force
- Service years: 1921–1961
- Rank: Lieutenant General
- Commands: Västmanland Wing; Royal Swedish Air Force Staff College; Chief of the Air Staff; Swedish National Defence College; Swedish contingent to NNSC

Lieutenant General Gustaf Adolf Westring (2 September 1900 – 15 March 1963) was a Swedish Air Force officer. Westring served as commanding officer of Västmanland Wing, as head of the Royal Swedish Air Force Staff College, as Chief of the Air Staff and as head of the Swedish National Defence College. He was also head of the Swedish contingent to the Neutral Nations Supervisory Commission (NNSC).

== Early life ==
Westring was born on 2 September 1900 in Stockholm, the son of president of the Svea Court of Appeal, Hjalmar Westring (1857–1926) and his wife, Countess Adélaïde Stackelberg. His brothers were Claes Westring (1893–1975), a diplomat, and Lennart Westring (1897–1979), a physician.

== Career ==
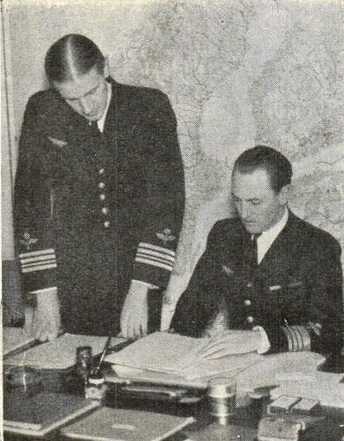
Westring (left) and Bengt Nordenskiöld in 1939.

Westring graduated as a naval officer in 1922 and was commissioned as a fänrik in the Swedish Navy. He underwent flight training in 1924. Westring attended the staff course at the Royal Swedish Naval Staff College from 1928 to 1929. Westring became a lieutenant in the Swedish Air Force in 1929 and served in the Air Staff from 1929 to 1934 and was an expert in the 1930 Defence Commission from 1931 to 1935. In 1936, Westring underwent pilot training for heavy bomber in Royal Air Force. Back in Sweden, he then served in the Air Staff from 1936 to 1940.

He was promoted to major in 1939 and was head of the Operations Department in the Air Staff in 1940. From 1940 to 1942, Westring served as head of the Air Operations Department in the Defence Staff. He was promoted to colonel in 1943 and served as commanding officer of the Västmanland Wing from 1942 to 1945 and then as head of the Royal Swedish Air Force Staff College from 1945 to 1947. Westring was then Chief of the Air Staff for ten years, from 1947 to 1957, and he was promoted to major general in 1950. He was head of the Swedish National Defence College from 1957 to 1960 and of the Swedish Delegation to the Neutral Nations Supervisory Commission (NNSC) in Korea from 1 October 1960 to 31 October 1961. Westring was promoted to lieutenant general in 1961 and retired from the military.

Westring served as a military adviser at the disarmament conference in Geneva in 1962 and he belonged to AB Atlas Copco's Executive Board from 1962 to 1963.

== Personal life ==
In 1927, he married Anna Löfving (1903–1989), the daughter of stationmaster Oscar Löfving and Anna Holmlin. They had four children: Margareta (born 1929), Gösta (born 1931), Elisabeth (born 1938) and Peter (born 1942).

== Death ==
Westring died on 15 March 1963 when Lloyd Aéreo Boliviano Flight 915 from Arica, Chile to La Paz, Bolivia, that was operated by a Douglas DC-6 (registered CP-707) on this day, crashed into Chachacomani mountain, killing all 36 passengers and three crew members. Westring was working for AB Atlas Copco at the time. Another Swede died on the same flight, Lars Gunnar Nilsson, a sales engineer at Atlas Copco's South American subsidiary.

He was buried on 4 May 1963 in Djursholm Cemetery.

== Dates of rank ==
- 1922 – Acting sub-lieutenant (Swedish Navy)
- 1924 – Lieutenant
- 1929 – Lieutenant (Swedish Air Force)
- 1938 – Captain
- 1939 – Major
- 1942 – Lieutenant colonel
- 1943 – Colonel
- 1950 – Major general
- 1961 – Lieutenant general

== Awards and decorations ==
=== Swedish ===
- (Sweden) Commander 1st Class of the Order of the Sword (6 June 1951)
- (Sweden) Commander 1st Class of the Order of Vasa
- (Sweden) Knight of the Order of the Polar Star

=== Foreign ===
- Commander 1st Class of the Order of the White Rose of Finland
- (Norway) Commander with Star of the Order of St. Olav (1 July 1960)
- (Denmark) Commander of the Order of the Dannebrog
- (France) Officer of the Legion of Honour
- (United States) Officer of the Legion of Merit (20 September 1960)

== Honours ==
- Member of the Royal Swedish Academy of War Sciences (1943)

== Bibliography ==
- Carleson, Eric; Westring, Gustaf Adolf, eds. (1939). Sveriges försvar: ett samlingsverk i ord och bild. 5, Flygvapnet (in Swedish). Stockholm: Åhlén & Åkerlund. SELIBR 1935942.
- Westring, Gustaf Adolf (1936). Luftkrig: en sammanställning av "douhetismen" och andra teorier samt några fakta och reflexioner rörande nutida luftförsvar (in Swedish). Stockholm: Norstedt. SELIBR 1381454.

Military offices
Preceded by Folke Ramström	Defence Staff's Air Operations Department; 1940–1942	Succeeded by None
Preceded by Axel Ljungdahl	Västmanland Wing; 1942–1945	Succeeded by Arthur Falk
Preceded by Karl Silfverberg	Royal Swedish Air Force Staff College; 1945–1947	Succeeded by Björn Bjuggren
Preceded by Axel Ljungdahl	Chief of the Air Staff; 1947–1957	Succeeded by Lennart Peyron
Preceded by Ivar Backlund	Swedish National Defence College; 1957–1960	Succeeded by Sam Myhrman
Preceded by Bengt Lind af Hageby	Heads of Swedish Delegation to the NNSC; 1 October 1960 – 31 October 1961	Succeeded by Åke Wikland
