= Karl Silfverberg =

Swedish Air Force officer

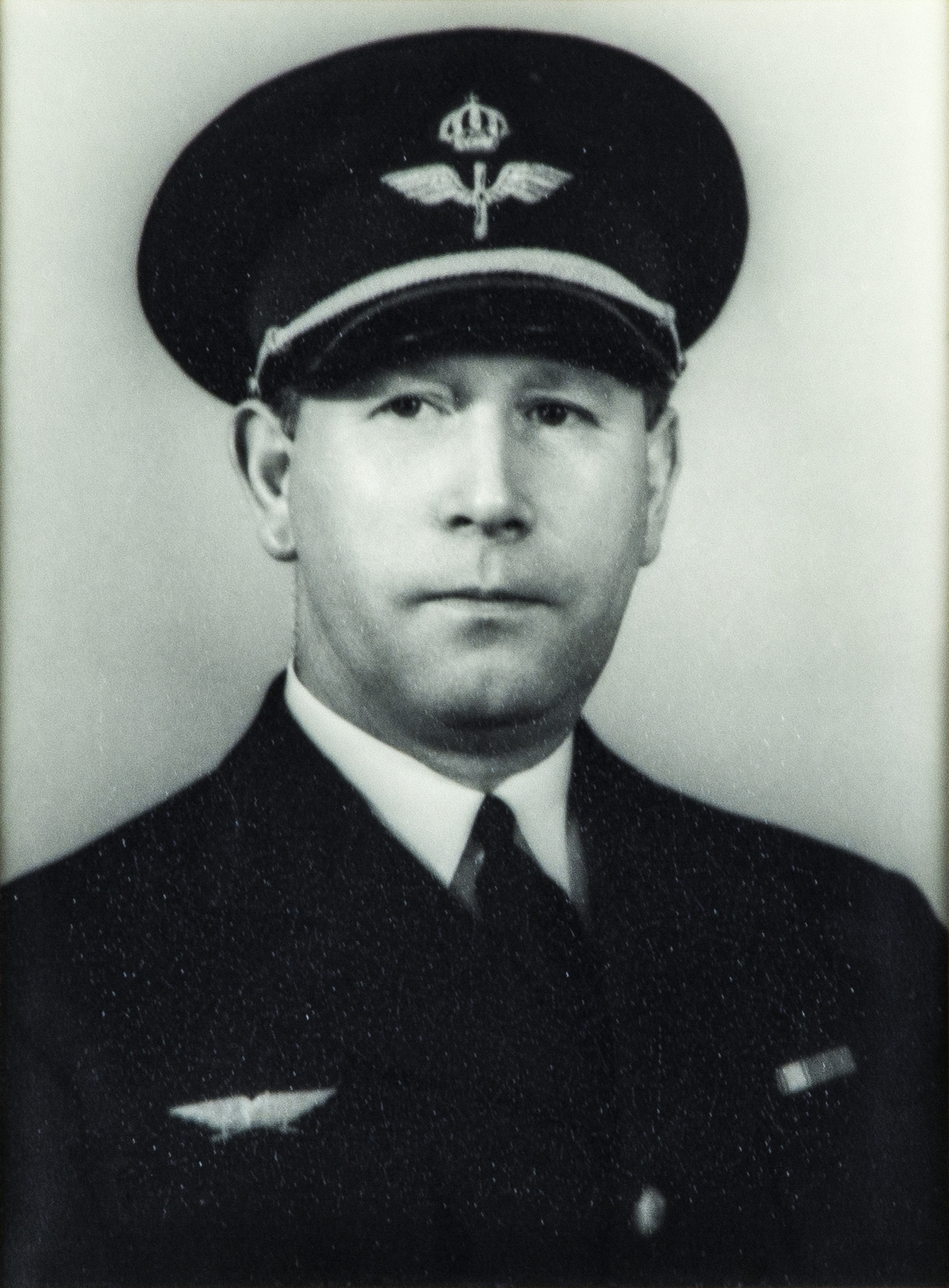
- Silfverberg as lieutenant colonel
- Born: Karl Josef Arnold Silfverberg; 25 July 1899; Karlskrona, Sweden
- Died: 23 October 1978 (aged 79); Stockholm, Sweden
- Burial place: Galärvarvskyrkogården
- Military career
- Allegiance: Sweden
- Branch: Swedish Air Force
- Service years: 1923–1964
- Rank: Major General
- Commands: Royal Swedish Air Force Staff College; Vice Chief of the Air Staff; Swedish Air Force Reorganization Delegation

Major General Karl Josef Arnold Silfverberg (25 July 1899 – 23 October 1978) was a Swedish Air Force officer. In the early 1920s, Silfverberg earned maritime certifications and entered the Swedish Navy Reserve, eventually transitioning to the Swedish Air Force in the late 1920s. He held various positions within the Air Force, including overseeing the Signal Equipment Office and attending the Royal Swedish Naval Staff College. Silfverberg's career advanced through promotions to captain and major. In 1940, he became the head of the Air Staff's Organizational Department and later attained the ranks of lieutenant colonel and colonel. Instead of leading the Blekinge Wing, he became Vice Chief of the Air Staff in 1943 and simultaneously headed the Royal Swedish Air Force Staff College.

Throughout his career, Silfverberg was involved in defense-related investigations and committees, such as the 1941 Defense Investigation and the organization of private aviation. He also held various leadership and advisory roles in military and civilian organizations, including the Swedish Civil Service Board and the Royal Swedish Aero Club. Silfverberg was an honorary member of several associations, including the Royal Swedish Aero Club and the National Swedish Federation of Government Officers.

== Early life ==
Silfverberg born on 25 July 1899 in the Royal Karlskrona Admiralty Parish in Karlskrona, Sweden, the son of K E Silfverberg, a model maker, and his wife (née Svensson). He attended the Cabin Boy Corps (Skeppsgossekåren) in Karlskrona from 1914 to 1917.

== Career ==
Silfverberg obtained his mate's examination (styrmansexamen) in 1921, a master's [certificate] examination (sjökaptenexamen) in 1922, and became a second lieutenant in the Swedish Navy reserve in 1923. He was promoted to underlöjtnant in 1928 and completed his limited studentexamen in 1929, along with supplementary training for naval officer certification in the same year. In 1929/1930, Silfverberg transferred to the Swedish Air Force, where he achieved the rank of lieutenant. Within the Air Force, he assumed leadership of the Swedish Air Board's (Flygstyrelsen) military bureau, specifically overseeing the Signal Equipment Office, in 1931. He attended the Royal Swedish Naval Staff College from 1933 to 1934. His career continued to progress as he was promoted to the rank of captain in 1936 and major in 1940. In 1940, Silfverberg served as the head of the Air Staff's Organizational Department, subsequently attaining the rank of lieutenant colonel in 1942 and colonel in 1943.

Initially, Silfverberg was slated to take over the leadership of Blekinge Wing, but due to an unexpected death, he instead assumed the role of Vice Chief of the Air Staff in 1943, holding this position until 1948. During his time as Vice Chief of the Air Staff, he also served as the head of the Royal Swedish Air Force Staff College from 1944 to 1945. Silfverberg served as the inspector for the Air Force's technical service from 1948 to 1959, when he was promoted to the rank of major general. Following this, he became the head of the Swedish Air Force Reorganization Delegation (flygvapnets personaldelegation) from 1959 to 1964 and concurrently represented the Air Force in the Swedish Armed Forces Reorganization Delegation (försvarets personaldelegation) during the same period.

Silfverberg participated in several investigations concerning the organization and structuring of the Swedish defence system. He was a member of the 1941 Defense Investigation (1941 års försvarsutredning), involved in the organization of private aviation from 1941 to 1943, the military meteorology service's organization in 1943, the Navy's replacement construction (flottans ersättningsbyggnad) in 1943, and military retirement ages in 1944 and 1948. Additionally, he served on the 1945 Defense Committee. Silfverberg held the position of secretary in the parliamentary Special Committee on Defence in 1942, was a member of the Swedish Organization Board (statens organisationsnämnd) from 1944 to 1948, served on the Real Estate Board of the Swedish Armed Forces (Försvarets fastighetsnämnd) from 1954 to 1964, and was the vice chairman of the Swedish Civil Service Board (statstjänstemannanämnden) from 1944 to 1946. Furthermore, he served as the first vice chairman of the National Swedish Federation of Government Officers (Statstjänstemännens riksförbund) from 1946 to 1954 (later becoming chairman from 1955 to 1959). Silfverberg was also a board member of the Royal Swedish Aero Club from 1943 to 1948 and again from 1954 to 1963. He held the position of vice chairman in its executive committee in 1954.

Silfverberg served as the vice chairman of the Swedish Aviators' National Association (Svenska flygares riksförbund) from 1944 to 1947, the chairman of the Swedish Association of Army, Navy and Air Force Officers (Svenska officersförbundet) from 1950 to 1956, and the chairman of the Swedish Association of Voluntary Observers (Sveriges luftbevakningsförbund) from 1959 to 1962. Additionally, he was a member of the military board of the Central Board of the Church of Sweden (Diakonistyrelsen) from 1952 to 1964. Silfverberg held the honorary membership status in several organizations, including the Royal Swedish Aero Club in 1963, the Swedish Association of Army, Navy, and Air Force Officers, the National Swedish Federation of Government Officers, and the National Federation of Swedish Air Force Associations.

== Personal life ==
In 1926, Silfverberg married Karin Andersson (1903–1987), the daughter of the construction master Karl August Andersson and Sigrid Olsson. They had three children: Colonel Percy Silfverberg (1927–2020), Claes-Olof (1929–1984), and Kerstin (born 1932).

== Death ==
Silfverberg died on 23 October 1978 in Hedvig Eleonora Parish, Stockholm. He was interred on 24 November 1978 at Galärvarvskyrkogården in Stockholm.

== Dates of rank ==
- 1923 – Second lieutenant
- 1928 – Underlöjtnant
- 1929/30 – Lieutenant
- 1936 – Captain
- 1940 – Major
- 1942 – Lieutenant colonel
- 1943 – Colonel
- 1959 – Major general

== Awards and decorations ==
=== Swedish ===
- (Sweden) Commander 1st Class of the Order of the Sword (15 November 1949)
- (Sweden) Commander of the Order of the Sword (15 November 1947)
- (Sweden) Knight of the Order of the Sword (1943)
- (Sweden) Knight of the Order of the Polar Star (1946)
- (Sweden) Knight of the Order of Vasa (1942)
- (Sweden) Royal Swedish Aero Club Medal of Merit in gold
- (Sweden) Vasa Medal, 8th size in gold
- (Sweden) SignM

=== Foreign ===
- (Norway) Knight 1st Class of the Order of St. Olav (1936)

== Honours ==
- Member of the Royal Swedish Academy of War Sciences (1943)

Military offices
Preceded by Nils Lindquist	Royal Swedish Air Force Staff College; 1944–1945	Succeeded by Gustaf Adolf Westring
Preceded by None	Vice Chief of the Air Staff; 1943–1948	Succeeded by Torsten Rapp
Professional and academic associations
Preceded by Einar Björk	Chairman of the Swedish Association of Army, Navy and Air Force Officers; 1950–1956	Succeeded by Gustav Lindgren
