= Lennart Peyron =

Swedish Air Force officer

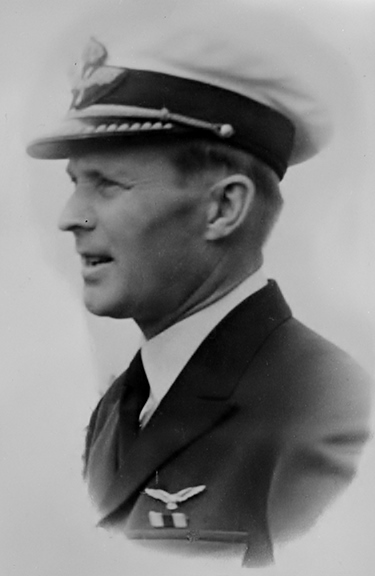
- Born: Knut Lennart Peyron; 19 November 1909; Stockholm, Sweden
- Died: 30 December 1981 (aged 72); Stockholm, Sweden
- Burial place: Norra begravningsplatsen
- Military career
- Allegiance: Sweden
- Branch: Swedish Air Force
- Service years: 1931–1966
- Rank: Major General
- Commands: Flygkadettskolan; Östgöta Wing; Chief of the Air Staff; Third Air Group

Major General Knut Lennart Peyron (19 November 1909 – 30 December 1981) was a Swedish Air Force officer. His senior commands include commanding officer of the Östgöta Wing (F 3), Chief of the Air Staff and the Third Air Group (E 3).

== Early life ==
Peyron was born on 19 November 1909 in Stockholm, Sweden, the son of Major General Henry Peyron and his wife Louise (née Reuterskiöld).

== Career ==
Peyron became an officer in 1931 when he was commissioned as fänrik in the Swedish Navy. He was promoted to lieutenant in 1936 in the Swedish Air Force, captain in 1940 and major in 1944. Peyron served as chief of staff of the Third Air Group (Tredje flygeskadern, E 3) from 1944 to 1947 when he was promoted to lieutenant colonel. He was then commanding officer of the Flygkadettskolan (F 20) from 1947 to 1951 when he was promoted to colonel and appointed commanding officer of the Östgöta Wing (F 3). In 1952, Peyron was appointed Inspector of Flight Safety (Flygsäkerhetstjänsten) and in 1957 Chief of the Air Staff. In 1957, Peyron was also promoted to major general. He served in this position for three years until he was appointed commanding officer of the Third Air Group in 1960.

== Personal life ==
In 1935, he married Birgit Christianson (born 1911), the daughter of banker Johan Christianson and Helga (née Lundqvist).

== Death ==
Peyron died on 30 December 1981 and was buried at Norra begravningsplatsen in Stockholm on 8 April 1982.

== Dates of rank ==
- 1931 – Acting sub-lieutenant (Swedish Navy)
- 1936 – Lieutenant
- 1940 – Captain
- 1944 – Major
- 1947 – Lieutenant colonel
- 1951 – Colonel
- 1957 – Major general

== Awards and decorations ==
- (Sweden) Commander Grand Cross of the Order of the Sword (17 November 1969)
- (Sweden) Commander 1st Class of the Order of the Sword (6 June 1957)
- (Sweden) Knight of the Order of the Polar Star
- (Sweden) Knight of the Order of Vasa

== Honours ==
- Member of the Royal Swedish Academy of War Sciences (1953)

== Filmography ==
- Första divisionen (1941) - air force officer

Military offices
Preceded by Hugo Beckhammar	Östgöta Wing (F 3); 1951–1952	Succeeded by Nils-Magnus von Arbin
Preceded by Gustaf Adolf Westring	Chief of the Air Staff; 1957–1960	Succeeded by Stig Norén
Preceded by Lage Thunberg	Third Air Group; 1960–1966	Succeeded by None
