= Anders Persson (Swedish Air Force officer) =

Swedish Air Force officer (born 1968)

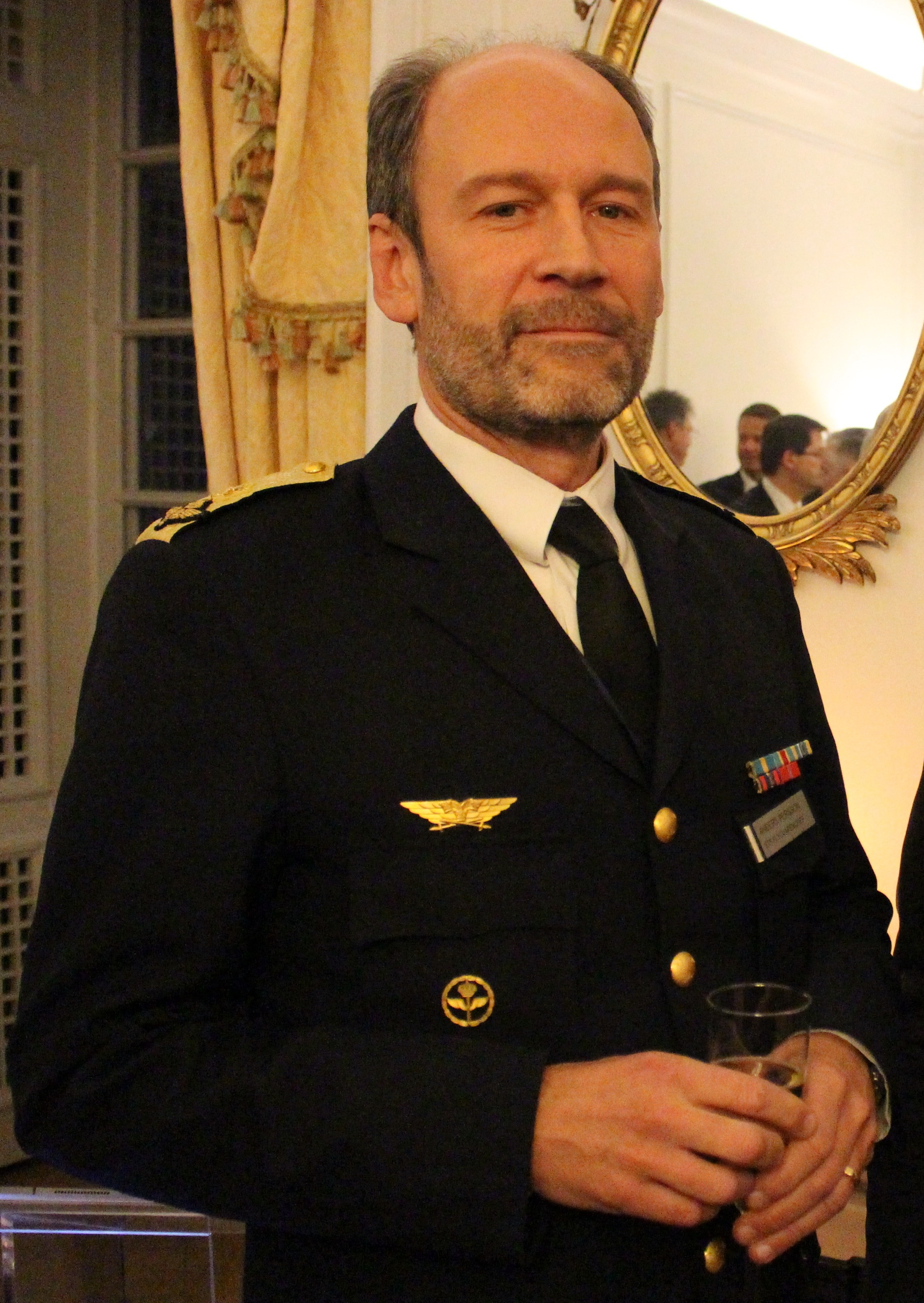
- Persson in 2019.
- Born: Per Anders Rolfson Persson; 18 March 1968 (age 58); Sollentuna, Sweden
- Military career
- Allegiance: Sweden
- Branch: Swedish Air Force
- Service years: 1992–present
- Rank: Brigadier general
- Commands: Air Combat Training School; Uppsala Garrison; Chief of the Air Staff; Deputy Chief of Air Force; Deputy Vice-Chancellor, Defence University

Brigadier General Per Anders Rolfson Persson (born 18 March 1968) is a Swedish Air Force officer. Since August 2023, Persson serves as deputy head of Sweden's military delegation to NATO in Brussels, Belgium.

== Early life ==
Persson was born on 18 March 1968 in Sollentuna, Sweden. He studied mechanics at the Chalmers University of Technology from 1989 to 1990 and attended the Swedish Air Force Flying School in Ljungbyhed from 1990 to 1991.

== Career ==
Persson attended the Swedish Air Force Officers’ College (Flygvapnets officershögskola) from 1991 to 1992 and the Royal Swedish Air Force Staff College (Flygvapnets krigshögskola) from 1995 to 1998. Persson was promoted to lieutenant in 1996 and to captain in 1998. Persson attended the Staff Program of the Swedish Defence University from 1999 to 2000 and its Management Program from 2002 to 2004.

Persson served as Project Manager in the Strategic Plans and Policy Directorate (Strategiledningen) the Strategic Plans & Policy at the Swedish Armed Forces Headquarters in Stockholm from July 2006 to July 2009. He then served as chief of staff of the Swedish Air Combat Training School (Luftstridsskolan) in Uppsala from July 2009 to November 2010 and then as Deputy Commander of the Swedish Air Combat Training School from 2010 to December 2011. Persson was then appointed Defense Attaché posted at the Swedish Embassy in Bern from June 2010 to June 2012. He was then chief of staff of the Air Component Command in Stockholm from January 2012 to May 2014, and as acting commander of the Air Component Command between 14 October 2013 and 31 December 2013, as well as commanding officer of the Swedish Air Combat Training School in Uppsala from 1 June 2014 to June 2017. During this time, Persson was also commander of Uppsala Garrison.

Persson was head of Training and Development (Air Force) (Chef för produktionsledningen för Flygvapnet, C PROD Flyg) at the Swedish Armed Forces Headquarters from June 2017 to December 2018, and as Chief of the newly formed Air Staff from January 2019 to October 2019. He was appointed Deputy Chief of Air Force and promoted to brigadier general on 1 October 2019. On 1 August 2022, Persson assumed the position of Deputy Vice-Chancellor of the Swedish Defence University, and thus the highest-ranking military officer at the university. Persson was placed as deputy head of Sweden's military delegation to NATO in Brussels, Belgium from 1 August 2023.

Persson is regional chairman of the Swedish Air Force Volunteers Association from June 2014.

== Awards and decorations ==
- (Sweden) Swedish Armed Forces Conscript Medal
- (Sweden) Svea Artillery Regiment Commemorative Medal (Svea artilleriregementes minnesmedalj, SveartregSMM)
- (Sweden) Jämtland Wing Commemorative Medal (Jämtlands flygflottiljs minnesmedalj, JämtlffljMSM)
- (Sweden) Uppland Wing Commemorative Medal (Upplands flygflottiljs minnesmedalj, UpplffljSMM)
- (Sweden) Swedish Air Force Volunteers Association Merit Badge
- (Ukraine) Order of Merit, 3rd class

== Honours ==
- Member of the Royal Swedish Academy of War Sciences, Department III, Air Warfare Studies (October 2008)

== Dates of rank ==
- 1992 – Second lieutenant
- 1996 – Lieutenant
- 1998 – Captain
- 19?? – Major
- 20?? – Lieutenant colonel
- 20?? – Colonel
- 2019 – Brigadier general

Military offices
Preceded by None	Chief of the Air Staff; 2019–2019	Succeeded by Anders Jönsson
Preceded by Carl-Johan Edström	Deputy Chief of Air Force; 2019–2022	Succeeded by Tommy Petersson
Preceded by Fredrik Ståhlberg	Deputy Vice-Chancellor of the Swedish Defence University; 2022–2023	Succeeded by Anders Callert
