= Bert Stenfeldt =

Swedish Air Force officer (1933–2023)

- Born: Bert Göran Stenfeldt; 12 August 1933; Malmö, Sweden
- Died: 10 December 2023 (aged 90)
- Military career
- Allegiance: Sweden
- Branch: Swedish Air Force
- Service years: 1958–1994
- Rank: Major General
- Commands: 71st Fighter Division; Helicopter Test Unit; Norrbotten Wing; Chief of the Air Staff; 1st Air Command

Major General Bert Göran Stenfeldt (12 August 1933 – 10 December 2023) was a Swedish Air Force officer. Stenfeldt served as Chief of the Air Staff from 1987 to 1990 and as the Commander General of the 1st Air Command from 1990 to 1994.

== Early life ==
Lönnbom was born on 12 August 1933 in Saint Paul Parish (Sankt Pauli församling) in Malmö, Malmöhus County, Sweden, the son of Harald Persson and his wife Agnes (née Stenfeldt). Stenfeldt became a sergeant pilot in 1951.

== Career ==
Stenfeldt was commissioned as an officer in the Swedish Air Force in 1958 with the rank of second lieutenant, stationed in Blekinge Wing. He initially flew the Saab T18, a torpedo-carrying version of the B18 propeller-driven twin-engine bomber. He was promoted to lieutenant in 1960 and from 1960 to 1966, Stenfeldt was posted at Skaraborg Wing. He attended the General Course at the Swedish Armed Forces Staff College in 1963, and commanded the 71st Fighter Division (71. stridsflygdivisionen) from 1964 to 1966. Stenfeldt was promoted to captain in 1966 and attended the Staff Course at the Swedish Armed Forces Staff College from 1966 to 1968. Stenfeldt served in the staff of the 1st Air Command from 1968 to 1970 and in 1971 he was promoted to major and to lieutenant colonel.

Stenfeldt attended the Air Command and Staff College in United States from 1973 to 1974 and served as head of the Central Department in Section 1 of the Air Staff from 1976. Stenfeldt studied at the Swedish National Defence College in 1978 and in 1982. He was promoted to colonel in 1979 and appointed commander of the Helicopter Test Unit (Helikopterförsöksförbandet, HKP F). In 1982, Stenfeldt was promoted to senior colonel and appointed commander of the Norrbotten Wing and Upper Norrland air defence sector (F 21/Se ÖN). From 1 April 1984, he served as head of the System Section FS2 (Systemsektion FS2) in the Air Staff. On 1 November 1987, Stenfeldt was promoted to major general and assumed the position of Chief of the Air Staff, a post he held for three years. His final assignment before retiring was as Commanding General of the 1st Air Command in Gothenburg from 1 October 1990 to 1994. Stenfeldt retired on 30 September 1994.

== Personal life ==
In 1955, he married Maybritt Christensson.

In 2007, Stenfeldt became chairman of the Swedish Air Force Historic Flight. On 4 April 2019, Stenfeldt became an honorary member of the F 18 Kamratförening ("F 18 Friendship Association").

== Death ==
Stenfeldt 10 December 2023 in Grevie District, Båstad Municipality, at the age of 90. The funeral took place on 17 January 2024 in Förslöv Church in Förslöv, Båstad Municipality.

== Dates of rank ==
- 1958 – Second lieutenant
- 1960 – Lieutenant
- 1966 – Captain
- 1971 – Major
- 1971 – Lieutenant colonel
- 1979 – Colonel
- 1982 – Senior colonel
- 1 November 1987 – Major general

== Awards and decorations ==
- (Sweden) Swedish Air Force Volunteers Association Medal of Merit in silver (1989)

== Honours ==
- Member of the Royal Swedish Academy of War Sciences (1979)

Military offices
Preceded by Lars-Bertil Persson	Norrbotten Wing; 1982–1984	Succeeded by Carl-Johan Rundberg
Preceded by Bengt Lönnbom	Chief of the Air Staff; 1987–1990	Succeeded by Bernt Östh
Preceded by Bertil Nordström	1st Air Command; 1990–1994	Succeeded by Christer Salsing as Acting
