= Axel Ljungdahl =

Swedish Air Force officer

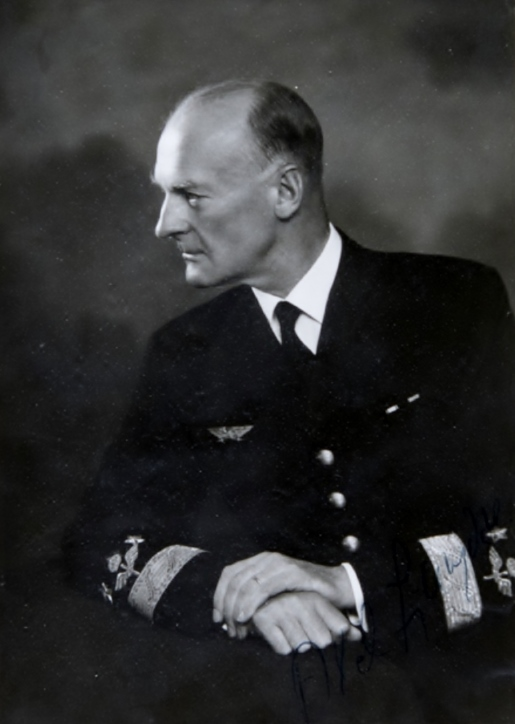
- Born: Axel Georg Ljungdahl; 7 August 1897; Lund, Sweden
- Died: 12 April 1995 (aged 97); Stockholm, Sweden
- Military career
- Allegiance: Sweden
- Branch: Swedish Air Force
- Service years: 1918–1960
- Rank: General
- Commands: Västmanland Wing; Chief of the Air Staff; 3rd Air Command; Chief of the Air Force

General Axel Georg Ljungdahl (7 August 1897 – 12 April 1995) was a Swedish Air Force officer. He was Chief of the Air Force from 1954 to 1960.

== Early life ==
Ljungdahl was born on 7 August 1897 in Lund, Sweden, the son of merchant August Ljungdahl and his wife Clara (née Lundberg) and brother of Karl-Gustaf Ljungdahl, the CEO of ÅF.

== Career ==
Ljungdahl was commissioned as an officer in 1918 and was assigned to the South Scanian Infantry Regiment (I 25) the same year. He trained as a pilot at Malmslätt from 1921 to 1923. Ljungdahl also attended the Royal Central Gymnastics Institute from 1922 to 1924, the Royal Swedish Army Staff College from 1924 to 1926 and the Royal Swedish Naval Staff College from 1926 to 1927. He served as captain of the General Staff in 1930 and as teacher at the Royal Swedish Army Staff College from 1930 to 1937. Ljungdahl was military attaché and air attaché in London from 1935 to 1936 and was promoted to major in the Swedish Air Force the same year.

He was head of the Education Department of the Air Staff from 1936 to 1939 when he was promoted to lieutenant colonel. Ljungdahl was wing commander of the Västmanland Wing from 1939 to 1942 and was promoted to colonel in 1940. He was then Chief of the Air Staff from 1942 to 1947 and was promoted to major general in 1943. Ljungdahl was commanding officer of the 3rd Air Command (Tredje flygeskadern, E 3) from 1947 to 1954 when he was promoted to lieutenant general. In 1954 he was appointed Chief of the Air Force. During Ljungdahl's time as Chief of the Air Force began the necessary modernization and expansion of including base and combat management systems. The Air Force began to bring balance and thus became a more homogenous and enduring force. He retired in 1960 and was then promoted to full general. Ljungdahl conducted his farewell flight as Chief of the Air Force in a J 28 Vampire.

During his career, Ljungdahl was also an expert in the 1930 Defense Commission and a member of the 1931 and the 1933 Air Commission as well as the National Swedish Civil Aviation Administration (Luftfartsstyrelsen) in 1945. He was a board member of the pension insurance company Valand-Pensionsbolaget and chairman of the board of Ostermans Aero AB. Ljungdahl became a member of the Royal Swedish Academy of War Sciences in 1943 and was its president from 1955 to 1957. After retiring from the military, Ljungdahl devoted his time to studies and received a Bachelor of Arts degree in 1965, a Licentiate of Philosophy degree in 1968, a Doctor of Philosophy degree in 1970 and a Bachelor of Theology degree in 1975.

== Personal life ==
In 1938, Ljungdahl married Ruth Hallert (née Johansson, born 1907), the daughter of managing director Axel Johansson and his wife. Ljungdahl was the father of Birgitta (born 1940).

== Death ==
Ljungdahl died on 12 April 1995 in Stockholm. He was interred on 12 July 1995 at Norra begravningsplatsen in Stockholm.

== Dates of rank ==
- 1922 – Lieutenant
- 1930 – Captain
- 1936 – Major
- 1939 – Lieutenant colonel
- 1940 – Colonel
- 1943 – Major general
- 1954 – Lieutenant general
- 1960 – General

== Awards and decorations ==
=== Swedish ===
- (Sweden) Commander Grand Cross of the Order of the Sword (6 June 1953)
- (Sweden) Commander 1st Class of the Order of the Sword (6 June 1945)
- (Sweden) Commander of the Order of the Sword (6 June 1944)
- (Sweden) Knight of the Order of the Sword (1939)
- (Sweden) Knight of the Order of the Polar Star (1943)
- (Sweden) Commander 1st Class of the Order of Vasa (6 June 1947)
- (Sweden) Knight of the Order of Vasa (1938)

=== Foreign ===
- Grand Cross of the Order of the Lion of Finland (before 1962)
- Grand Cross of the Order of the Star of Ethiopia (before 1962)
- (Netherlands) Knight Grand Cross of the Order of Orange-Nassau with swords (18 May 1957)
- (Norway) Grand Cross of the Order of St. Olav (1 July 1957)
- (Italy) 1st Class / Knight Grand Cross of the Order of Merit of the Italian Republic (2 May 1960)
- (Denmark) Commander 1st Class of the Order of the Dannebrog (before 1950)
- Commander 1st Class of the Order of the Lion of Finland (before 1950)
- (Austria) Commander 1st Class of the Order of Merit of the Austrian Republic (before 1962)
- (United Kingdom) Honorary Knight Commander of the Royal Victorian Order (June 1956)
- (United Kingdom) Commander of the Order of the British Empire (before 1950)
- (United States) Commander of the Legion of Merit (15 January 1958)
- (France) Commander of the Legion of Honour (senast 1955)
- (Italy) 2nd Class / Grand Officer of the Order of Merit of the Italian Republic (2 June 1959)
- (Finland) 3rd Class of the Order of the Cross of Liberty with swords (before 1942)

== Bibliography ==
- Ljungdahl, Axel (1985). Samvete och samhällsplikt: en undersökning av värnpliktiga som sökt vapenfri tjänst åren 1967-1976 (in Swedish). SELIBR 786096.
- Ljungdahl, Axel; Nordenskiöld, Bengt (1972). En flygofficers minnen [Memories of an Air Force Officer] (in Swedish). Stockholm: Norstedt. ISBN 91-1-725652-6. SELIBR 7151734.
- Ljungdahl, Axel (1969). Profetrörelser: deras orsaker, innebörd och förutsättningar. Stockholm studies in comparative religion, 0562-1070; 10 (in Swedish). Stockholm. SELIBR 8079115.
- Ljungdahl, Axel (1960). Ett sätt att se på livet: föredrag för Flygvapnets officerare (in Swedish). [Sverige]. SELIBR 12304785.
- Ljungdahl, Axel (1954). Studie över möjligheterna för hemortsbekämpning genom flygstridskrafter mot bakgrunden av erfarenheterna från det andra världskriget: tävlingsskrift, belönad med Kungl. Krigsvetenskapsakademiens medalj 1953 (in Swedish). [Stockholm]: [Krigsvetenskapsakad.] SELIBR 1442414.
- Ljungdahl, Axel (1954). Studie över möjligheterna för hemortsbekämpning genom flygstridskrafter mot bakgrunden av erfarenheterna från det andra världskriget. Kongl. Krigsvetenskapsakademiens handlingar; 1954:2 (in Swedish). Linköping. SELIBR 2100439.

Military offices
Preceded by Gustav Ström	Västmanland Wing; 1939–1942	Succeeded by Gustaf Adolf Westring
Preceded by Bengt Nordenskiöld	Chief of the Air Staff; 1942–1947	Succeeded by Gustaf Adolf Westring
Preceded by Folke Ramström	Third Air Group; 1947–1954	Succeeded by Torsten Rapp
Preceded by Bengt Nordenskiöld	Chief of the Air Force; 1954–1960	Succeeded by Torsten Rapp
Professional and academic associations
Preceded by Stig H:son Ericson	President of the Royal Swedish Academy of War Sciences; 1955–1957	Succeeded by Ivar Gewert
