= Sven-Olof Olson =

Swedish Air Force officer (1926–2021)

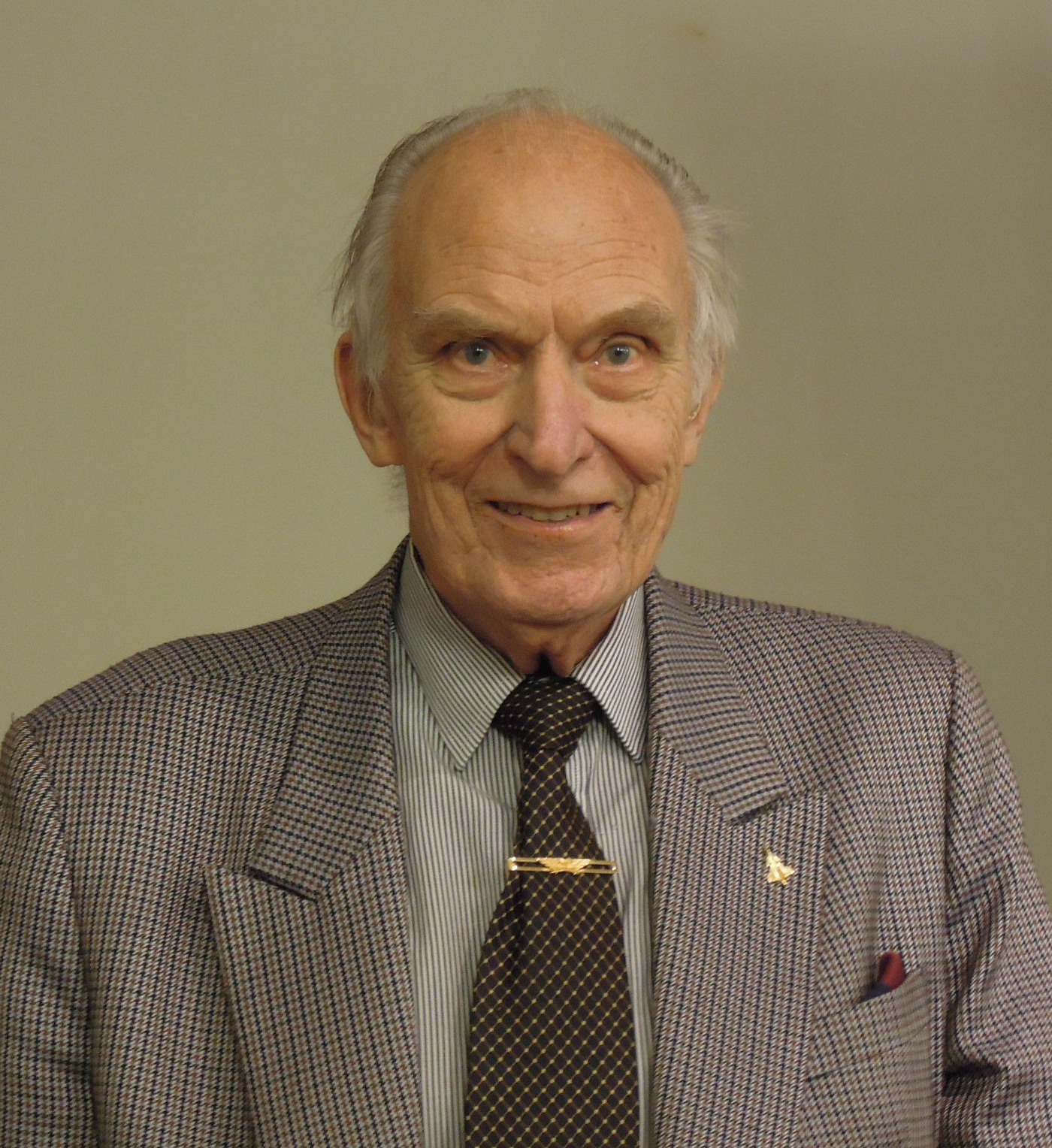
- Olson in 2015
- Born: 26 November 1926; Oskarshamn, Sweden
- Died: 20 April 2021 (aged 94); Sollentuna, Sweden
- Military career
- Allegiance: Sweden
- Branch: Swedish Air Force
- Service years: 1948–1988
- Rank: Lieutenant General
- Nickname: Stril-Olle
- Commands: Flygvapnets krigsskola; Uppland Wing; Vice Chief of the Defence Staff; Attack Command; Southern Military District; Chief of the Air Force
- Awards: Knight of the Order of the Sword

Lieutenant General Sven-Olof Olson (26 November 1926 – 20 April 2021) was a senior Swedish Air Force officer. He served as Commanding General of the Southern Military District from 1980 to 1982 and as Chief of the Air Force from 1982 to 1988.

== Early life ==
Olson was born on 26 November 1926 in Oskarshamn, Sweden, the son of Axel Olson, a furniture dealer, and his wife Ellen (née Ingvarsson). He passed studentexamen in Kalmar in 1945.

== Career ==
=== Military career ===
Olson graduated from the Royal Swedish Air Force College (Kungliga Flygkadettskolan) in 1948 and was commissioned as a second lieutenant at Västmanland Wing (F 1) the same year. As a pilot he flew J 30 and J 33. In 1951 he received the Stockholms-Tidningen's gold medal after having saved a J 30 Mosquito fighter aircraft from a serious situation. Olson was promoted to lieutenant in 1950 and attended the General Course at the Royal Swedish Air Force Staff College from 1953 to 1954, where he attended the Technical Course from 1956 to 1957. He was promoted to captain in 1957 and to major in 1960. Olson was head of the Department of Combat Management System ain he Air Staff's Planning Department from 1957 to 1962. He was responsible for operational planning and construction of STRIL 60 from 1958 to 1962 and was promoted to lieutenant colonel in 1963. He was head of the Planning Department in the Defence Staff from 1963 to 1967 when he was promoted to colonel.

Olson attended the Military Academy Karlberg and the Swedish National Defence College and was head of the Planning Department at the Defence Staff in 1963. Olson was a military expert in the 1965 Defense Investigation from 1965 to 1967 and commanding officer of the Flygvapnets krigsskola (F 20) from 1967 to 1971 and commanding officer of Uppland Wing (F 16) from 1971 to 1973, both in the city of Uppsala. He became major general and Vice Chief of the Defence Staff in 1973 and was Commanding General of the Attack Command (E 1) from 1977 to 1980 when he was promoted to lieutenant general. In 1980-1982 Olson was the military commander of the Southern Military District (Kristianstad) in Sweden. He assumed the position of Chief of the Air Force on 1 October 1982 and left the command on 30 September 1988.

=== Retirement ===
Olson served as president of the Royal Swedish Academy of War Sciences from 1988 to 1991. Olson became CEO of AB Afoma and chairman of the board of Nyge CSE Aviation AB (Saab Nyge Aero AB from 1999) as well as a board member of Volvo lastvagnar AB, Celsius AB and Maynard AB.

== Personal life ==
In 1950 he married the dance teacher Yvonne Jahn (born 1931), the daughter of John Jahn and Birgitta (née Bergman-Olson). He was the father of Tom (born 1951), Ylva (born 1955) and Åsa (born 1966).

== Dates of rank ==
- 1948 – Second lieutenant
- 19?? – Lieutenant
- 1957 – Captain
- 1960 – Major
- 1963 – Lieutenant colonel
- 1967 – Colonel
- 1973 – Major general
- 1980 – Lieutenant general

== Awards and decorations ==
=== Swedish ===
- (Sweden) Commander 1st Class of the Order of the Sword (6 June 1974)
- (Sweden) Commander of the Order of the Sword (18 November 1971)
- (Sweden) Knight 1st Class of the Order of the Sword (1964)
- (Sweden) Swedish Air Force Volunteers Association Medal of Merit in gold (January 1987)
- (Sweden) Swedish Air Force Volunteers Association Shield of Honour (January 1987)
- (Sweden) Swedish Military Sports Association Medal of Merit in gold (The King's Medal) (Sveriges militära idrottsförbund förtjänstmedalj i guld (Kungamedaljen)) (1989)
- (Sweden) Stockholms-Tidningen's gold medal "for Swedish aviation services" (1950)

=== Foreign ===
- Commander Grand Cross of the Order of the Lion of Finland (7 April 1987)

== Honours ==
- Member of the Royal Swedish Academy of War Sciences (1968; president 1988–1991; honorary member in 2011)
- Honorary member of the Swedish Aviation Historical Society (Svensk flyghistorisk förening, SFF)
- Honorary member of the Östergötland Aviation Historical Society (Östergötlands Flyghistoriska Sällskap)

== Bibliography ==
- Olson, Sven-Olof, ed. (1969). Flygvapnets krigsskola, [Uppsala]: [25:e officersexamen F 20, 18.6.69] (in Swedish). Uppsala: Flygvapnets krigsskola.

Military offices
Preceded by Nils-Fredrik Palmstierna	Vice Chief of the Defence Staff; 1973–1977	Succeeded by Bengt Schuback
Preceded by Bengt Rosenius	Attack Command; 1977–1980	Succeeded by Erik Nygren
Preceded by Karl Eric Holm	Southern Military District; 1980–1982	Succeeded by Bengt Schuback
Preceded by Dick Stenberg	Chief of the Air Force; 1982–1988	Succeeded by Lars-Erik Englund
Professional and academic associations
Preceded by Per Sköld	President of the Royal Swedish Academy of War Sciences; 1988–1991	Succeeded by Carl-Olof Ternryd
