= Södermanland Wing =

Coordinates: 58.7847°N 16.9369°E

- Södermanlands flygflottilj
- Active: 1941–1980
- Country: Sweden
- Allegiance: Swedish Armed Forces
- Branch: Swedish Air Force
- Type: Wing
- Part of: Fourth Air Group (1945–1966); Eastern Military District (1966–1980)
- Garrison/HQ: Nyköping/Skavsta
- Mottos: Paci Et Libertati ("For peace and freedom")

Insignia
- Roundel

Aircraft flown
- Bomber: B 3, B 4, B 5, B 17
- Fighter: J 9, J 28B
- Reconnaissance: S 14, S 16, S 18A, S 22, S 31, S 29C, S 32C, S 35E
- Trainer: Sk 11, Sk 12, Sk 14, Sk 15, Sk 16, Sk 50
- Transport: Tp 10, Tp 46, Tp 83
- G 101, Se 102, Se 103, Se 104

Södermanland Wing (Swedish: Södermanlands flygflottilj), also F 11 Nyköping, or simply F 11, is a former Swedish Air Force wing with the main base located in south-east Sweden.

== History ==
The wing was set up outside Nyköping in 1940 as a long range reconnaissance wing with two squadrons of S 16B. After the war, the aircraft were replaced with J 9 from Svea Wing (F 8) and an additional squadron of B 3 from Västmanland Wing (F 1).

In 1946, two additional squadrons of S 18 were added.

In 1948, F 11 became the sole Swedish operator of three squadrons of S 31 when the B 3 and J 9 became obsolete.

In 1953, J 28 jet fighters were used for one year to train pilots for the introduction of the S 29 in 1954.

The S 18 squadrons were replaced by the S 32 in 1958 and the S 29s by J 35s in 1964. These four squadrons served until the decommissioning of the wing in 1980.

The airfield was used as a cargo airport from 1984 and from 1997 serves as Stockholm-Skavsta Airport (IATA: NYO, ICAO: ESKN) for international flights.

== Barracks and training areas ==
Skavsta Airfield outside Nyköping. The new establishment was completed on 14 October 1941. The airfield had two runways, one east-west of 2500 m (longest of the Swedish Air Force) and one north-south of 2000 m.

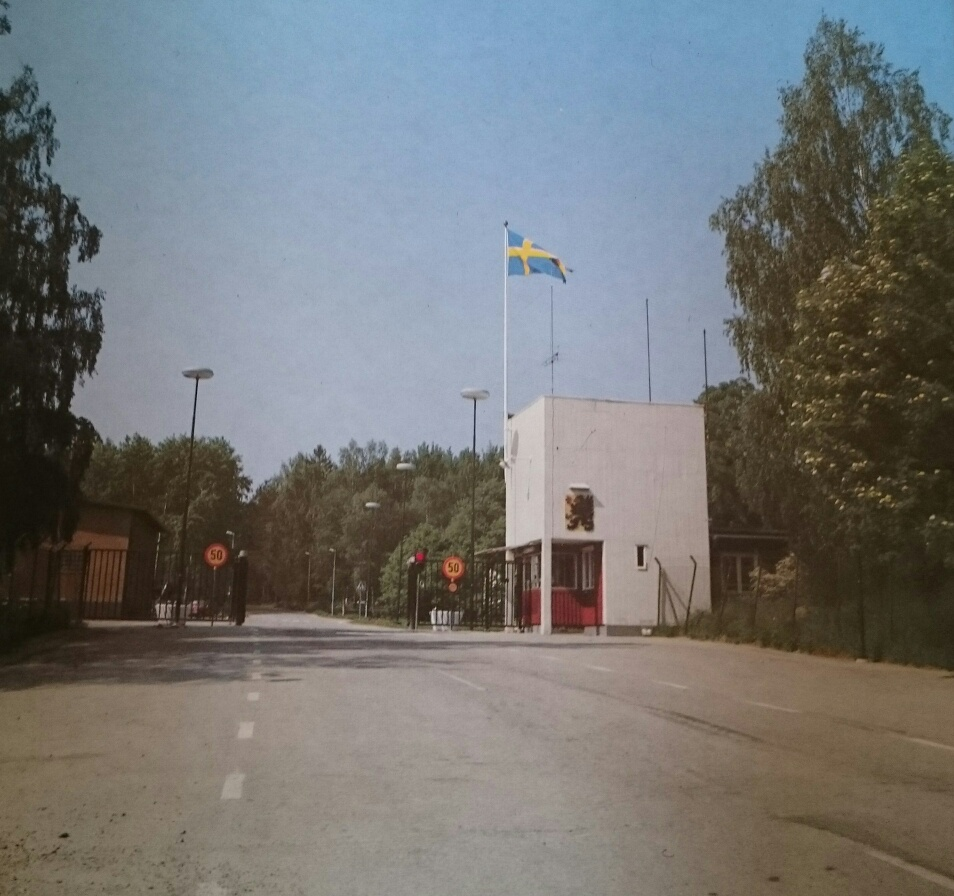
Guardhouse

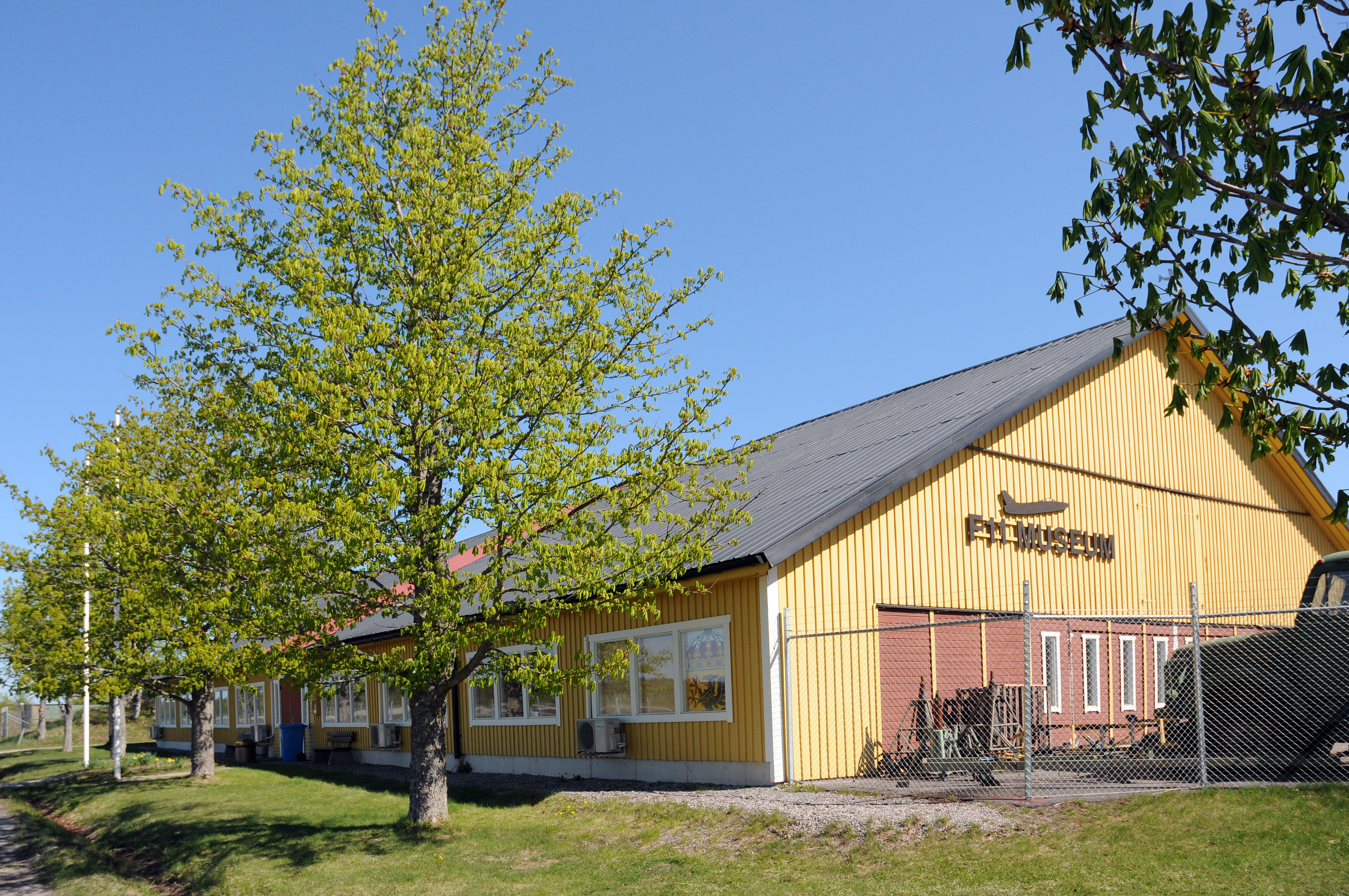
Museum

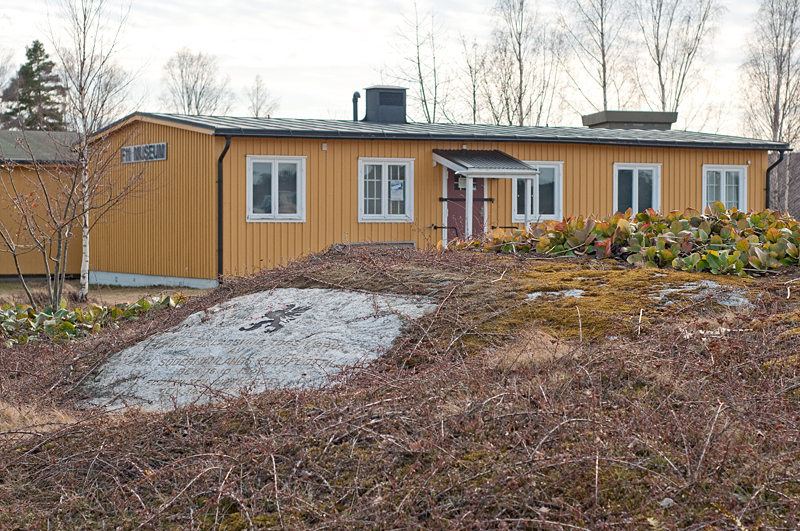
Building and commemorative stone

== Heraldry and traditions ==
=== Coat of arms ===
Blazon: "Or, the provincial badge of Södermanland, a griffon segreant sable, armed and langued gules".

=== Colours, standards and guidons ===
A colour was presented to the wing on 22 May 1942 at Stora torget in Nyköping by His Riyal Highness Crown Prince Gustaf Adolf. The colour is preserved at the Swedish Army Museum. Blazon: "On blue cloth in the centre the badge of the Air Force; a winged two-bladed propeller under a royal crown proper. In the first corner, the provincial badge of Södermanland; a griffon segreant or, armed and langued gules".

== Commanding officers ==
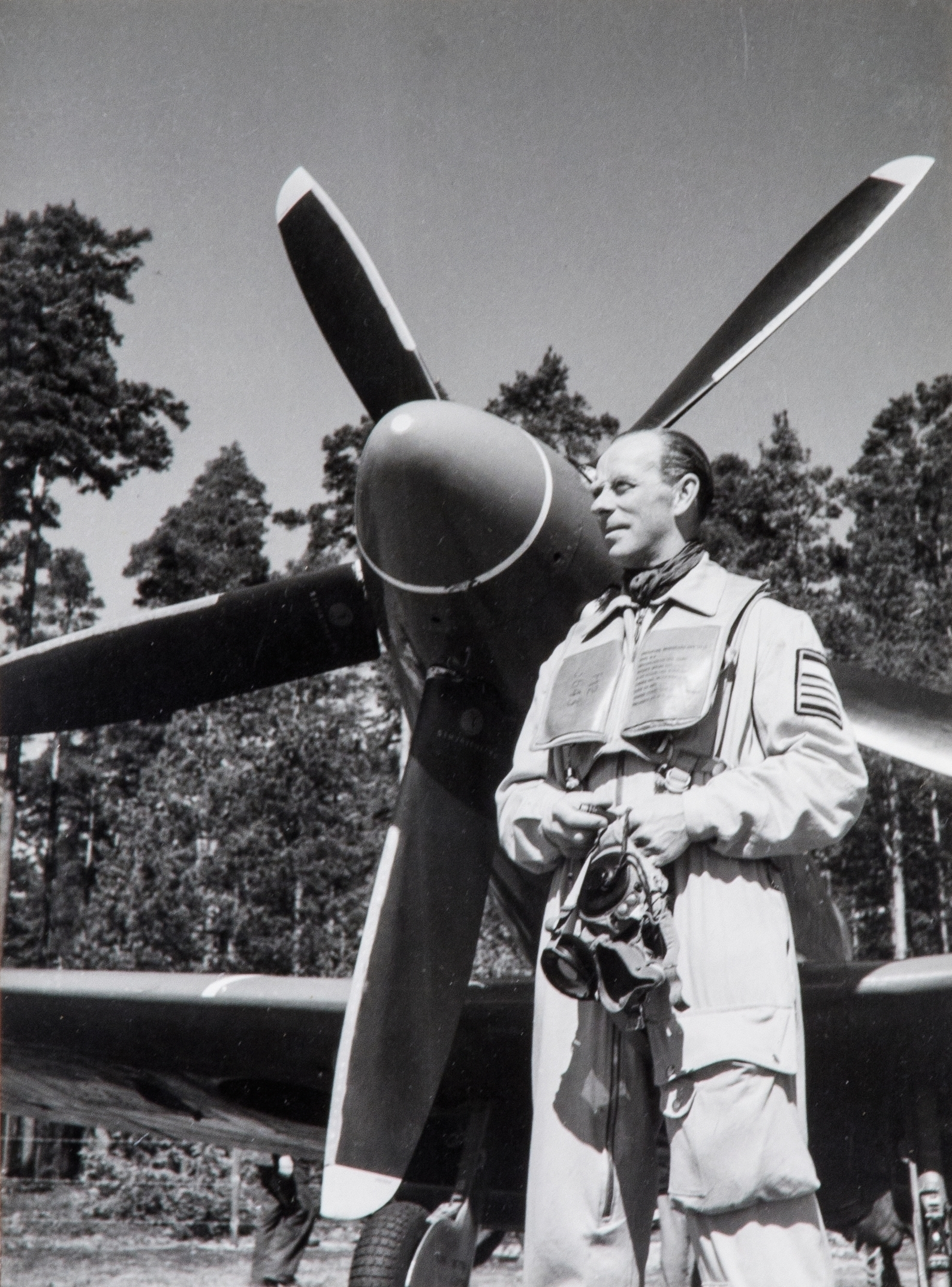
Wing commander 1949–1951, Colonel Greger Falk

Commanding officers from 1941 to 1980. The commanding officer was referred to as "wing commander" and had the rank of colonel.

- 1941–1945: Birger Schyberg
- 1945–1949: Arthur Henricson
- 1949–1951: Greger Falk
- 1951–1959: Henrik Nordström
- 1959–1961: Nils Personne
- 1961–1962: Bo Lindgren
- 1962–1966: Claes-Erik Abramson
- 1966–1980: Kurt Hagerström

== Names, designations and locations ==
Name	Translation	From		To
Första flygkåren	1st Air Corps	1929-07-01	–	1936-06-30
Kungl. Södermanlands flygflottilj	Royal Södermanland Wing	1941-07-01	–	1974-12-31
Södermanlands flygflottilj	Södermanland Wing; Södermanland Air Group	1975-01-01	–	1980-06-30
Designation		From		To
F 11		1941-07-01	–	1980-06-30
Location		From		To
Nyköping		1941-07-01	–	1941-10-13
Skavsta Airport		1941-10-14	–	1980-06-30

== See also ==
- List of military aircraft of Sweden
