= Royal Swedish Air Force Staff College =

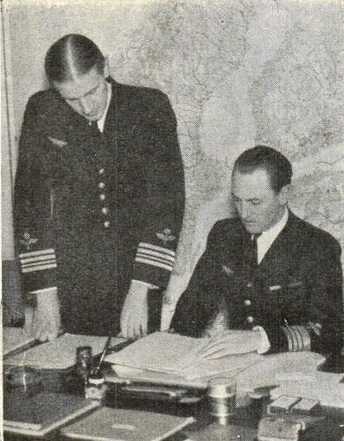
The new chief of the Royal Swedish Air Force Staff College, Colonel Bengt Nordenskiöld (seated) with course director, Major G. A. Westring.

Royal Swedish Air Force Staff College (Swedish: Flygkrigshögskolan, FKHS) was established in 1939 and located in Stockholm. It was under the command of the Chief of the Swedish Air Force.

From the start, one-year higher courses in staff service or technical staff service were given and as well from 1942 a six month long general course. The latter course was mandatory for all officers in the air force (except for commissary staff) and the higher courses gave theoretical eligibility for higher positions.

The Flygkrigshögskolan should not be confused with the Flygvapnets krigshögskola (F 20), from 1982 the name of the Flygkadettskolan at the Swedish Air Force Flying School (F 5) which was established in 1942, which in 1944 moved to Uppsala, and later became the Flygvapnets Uppsalaskolor (F 20).

The Royal Swedish Air Force Staff College was discontinued in 1961 and the Royal Swedish Armed Forces Staff College was formed by merging war colleges of the different military branches, namely the Royal Swedish Army Staff College (established 1878), the Royal Swedish Naval Staff College (established 1898) and the Royal Swedish Air Force Staff College (established 1939).

== Commanders ==
Commanders of FKHS:

- 1939–1941: Bengt Nordenskiöld
- 1941–1942: John Stenbeck
- 1942–1944: Nils Lindquist
- 1944–1945: Karl Silfverberg
- 1945–1947: Gustaf Adolf Westring
- 1947–1949: Björn Bjuggren
- 1949–1957: Björn Lindskog
- 1957–1961: Hugo Svenow
