= Swedish Air Force Flying School =

Coordinates: 56.0781°N 13.2297°E

- Krigsflygskolan
- Active: 1926–1998
- Country: Sweden
- Allegiance: Swedish Armed Forces
- Branch: Swedish Air Force
- Type: School (1926–1976); Wing (1976–1998)
- Part of: Chief of the Air Force (1926–1966); Southern Military District (1966–1998)
- Garrison/HQ: Ljungbyhed
- Mottos: Docendo discimus ("By teaching, we learn")
- March: "Krigsflygskolans marsch" (Hållander) (Note: The march was adopted and established on 20 August 1984.)

Insignia
- Roundels

Aircraft flown
- Trainer: Ö 2, Ö 4, Sk 1, Sk 3, Sk 5, Sk 6, Sk 8, Sk 9, Sk 10, Sk 11, Sk 12, Sk 14, Sk 15, Sk 16, Sk 25, Sk 50, Sk 60, Sk 61, J 28B, J 28C
- G 101, Se 102, Se 103, Se 104, Ö 1, Ö 5, Ö 9, P 1, J 1, J 2, J 3, J 5, J 6, J 7, J 9, S 6B, Fpl 801

Swedish Air Force Flying School (Swedish: Krigsflygskolan), also F 5 Ljungbyhed, or simply F 5, is a former Swedish Air Force training wing with the main base located in Ljungbyhed in southern Sweden.

== History ==
The heath at Ljungby was adopted for military use in 1658 by the Scanian Hussar Regiment as a training ground. In 1910, the first flights were commenced from the grounds.

Enoch Thulin set up a public flying school on June 16, 1915.

In 1926, the newly formed Swedish Air Force set up their flying school at Ljungbyhed.

Between 1983 and 1996 the Air Force school of meteorology was also located at Ljungbyhed.

In 1996, F 5 Ljungbyhed was decommissioned and the pilot training was taken over by the Scania Wing (F 10).

Currently, Lund University School of Aviation has commercial flying training at Ljungbyhed Airport (ICAO: ESTL).

== Heraldry and traditions ==
=== Coat of arms ===
The units first coat of arms was used until 1994. Blazon: "Azure, under three open crowns or placed two and one, an eagle wings elevated and displayed, on its breast a smaller sinister turned eagle, all or". Its second coat of arms was used from 1994 to 1998 and by the Flying School at F 10 from 1998 to 2002, and by the Flying School at F 16 from 2002 to 2003 and by the Flying School at F 17 from 2003. Blazon: "Or, an eagle azure wings elevated and displayed, on its breast a shield or with a smaller sinister turned eagle azure. On a chief azure a winged two-bladed propeller or".

Coat of arms until 1994.

Coat of arms from 1994 to 1998.

=== Colours, standards and guidons ===
The units first colour was presented at F 8 at Barkarby on 6 June 1939 by His Majesty the King Gustaf V. Blazon: "On blue cloth in the centre the badge of the Air Force; a winged two-bladed propeller under a royal crown proper, all or. In the first corner, three yellow open crowns, arranged two and one".

The units second colour was presented at F 5 Ljungbyhed on 25 August 1996 by His Majesty the King Carl XVI Gustaf. The colour was used as school colour at the Scania Wing (F 10) from 1 July 1998 to 31 December 2002 and at the Uppland Wing (F 16) from 1 January 2003 to 31 December 2003. The colour was drawn by Kristina Åkerberg and embroidered by machine in insertion technique by Engelbrektsson flag factory. Blazon: "On blue cloth in the centre the badge of the Air Force; a winged two-bladed propeller under a royal crown proper. In the first corner an eagle, wings elevated and displayed, on its breast an escutcheon with a sinister-turned eagle. All décor in yellow".

=== March ===
”Krigsflygskolans marsch” composed by the headmaster of the municipal music school in Nynäshamn, Sverker Hållander. The march was adopted and established on 20 August 1984.

== Commanding officers ==
Commanding officers from 1926 to 1998. The commanding officer was referred to as skolchef ("chief of school") and had the rank of colonel.

- 1926–1932: Arvid Flory
- 1932–1943: Åge Lundström
- 1943–1952: Ingemar Nygren
- 1952–1957: Knut Lindahl
- 1957–1965: Åke Rehnberg
- 1965–1971: Bengt Bellander
- 1971–1975: Åke Lönnberg
- 1975–1987: Per Widmark
- 1987–1998: Sven Sjöling

== Names, designations and locations ==
Name	Translation	From		To
Flygskolan		1926-07-01	–	1929-??-??
Flygskolkåren		1929-??-??	–	1936-06-30
Kungl. Flygkrigsskolan	Royal [Swedish] Air Force Flying School; Royal Flying School of the [Swedish] Air Force; Royal [Swedish] Air Force Flying Training School	1936-07-01	–	1942-??-??
Kungl. Krigsflygskolan	Royal [Swedish] Air Force Flying School; Royal Flying School of the [Swedish] Air Force; Royal [Swedish] Air Force Flying Training School	1942-??-??	–	1974-12-31
Krigsflygskolan	[Swedish] Air Force Flying School; Flying School of the [Swedish] Air Force [Swedish] Air Force Flying Training School	1975-01-01	–	1998-06-30
Designation		From		To
F 5		1926-07-01	–	1998-06-30
Location		From		To
Ljungbyhed Airport		1926-07-01	–	1998-06-30

== See also ==
- Swedish Air Force
- List of military aircraft of Sweden
