= 2nd Air Command (Sweden) =

- Andra flygeskadern
- Active: 1942–1966
- Country: Sweden
- Allegiance: Swedish Armed Forces
- Branch: Swedish Air Force
- Type: Bomb/fighter (1942–1948); Fighter (1948–1966)
- Size: Group
- Garrison/HQ: Gothenburg (1942-1957); Ängelholm (1957–1966)

Insignia
- Roundel

Aircraft flown
- Bomber: B 3, B 5, B 17
- Fighter: J 21A-2, J 21R, J 22, J 26, J 29, J 32B, J 34

The 2nd Air Command (Swedish: Andra flygeskadern, E 2) was a unit in the Swedish Air Force. The 2nd Air Command was the collective name given to the bomb and fighter wings who would jointly carry out heavier attacks in the event of war. It was active between 1942 and 1966.

== History ==
According to the Defence Act of 1936, a commander would have direct command over the Swedish Air Force units within the air command. In peacetime, his tasks included planning exercises, inspecting wing drills, and leading joint and large-scale applied exercises, meaning he did not have constant command over the wings.

Flygeskadern (the "Air Command") was organized when the state of preparedness was declared in September 1939 and was dissolved (except for the staff) in the latter part of 1940. According to the Defence Act of 1942, four air commands were to be permanently organized, and in peacetime, they were to command their respective wings in terms of tactical and operational exercises. The distribution of wings among the air commands varied after 1 July 1945, when all four air commands had been organized. The 1st Air Command was tasked with attack missions, the 2nd and 3rd with fighter missions, and the 4th with reconnaissance missions.

In 1957, the staff were merged with the staffs of the Southern Air Defence District and the Western Air Defence District and was transferred to Ängelholm. The 2nd, 3rd and 4th Air Commands were disbanded on 1 October 1966 and their duties were taken over by the military district staffs.

== Organisation ==
Organisation between 1942 and 1966.

=== 1942–1948 ===
Wings	Type	Main aircraft
Västgöta Wing (F 6)	Light bomb	B 5 / B 17
Skaraborg Wing (F 7)	Light bomb	B 17
Göta Wing (F 9)	Fighter	J 22
Halland Wing (F 14)	Light bomb	B 3 / B 18

=== 1948–1957 ===
Wings	Type	Main aircraft
Jämtland Wing (F 4)	Fighter	J 26
Göta Wing (F 9)	Fighter	J 28B
Scania Wing (F 10)	Fighter	J 21R / J 28B
Kalmar Wing (F 12)	Fighter	J 21A-2
Hälsinge Wing (F 15)	Fighter	J 21A-2 / J 21 A-3

=== 1957–1966 ===
Wings	Type	Main aircraft
Östgöta Wing (F 3)	Fighter	J 29
Göta Wing (F 9)	Fighter	J 29 Tunnan / J 34
Scania Wing (F 10)	Fighter	J 29 Tunnan / J 34
Kalmar Wing (F 12)	Fighter	J 32B

== Commanding officers ==
=== Commanders ===
- 1 July 1943 – 1947: Major General Åge Lundström
- 1947–1957: Major General Folke Ramström
- 1957–1966: Major General Ingvar Berg

=== Deputy commanders ===
After the air defence districts were decommissioned on 30 September 1957, a deputy commander position was added.

- 1957–1959: Colonel Ingemar Nygren
- 1959–1963: Colonel Gunnar Lindberg
- 1963–1966: Colonel Sten Rydström

== Names, designations and locations ==
Name	Translation	From		To
Andra flygeskadern	2nd Air Command	1942	–	1966
Designation		From		To
E 2		1942	–	1966-09-30
Location		From		To
Gothenburg		1942-??-??	–	1957-??-??
Ängelholm Airbase		1957-??-??	–	1966-09-30
