= Ingvar Berg =

Swedish modern pentathlete

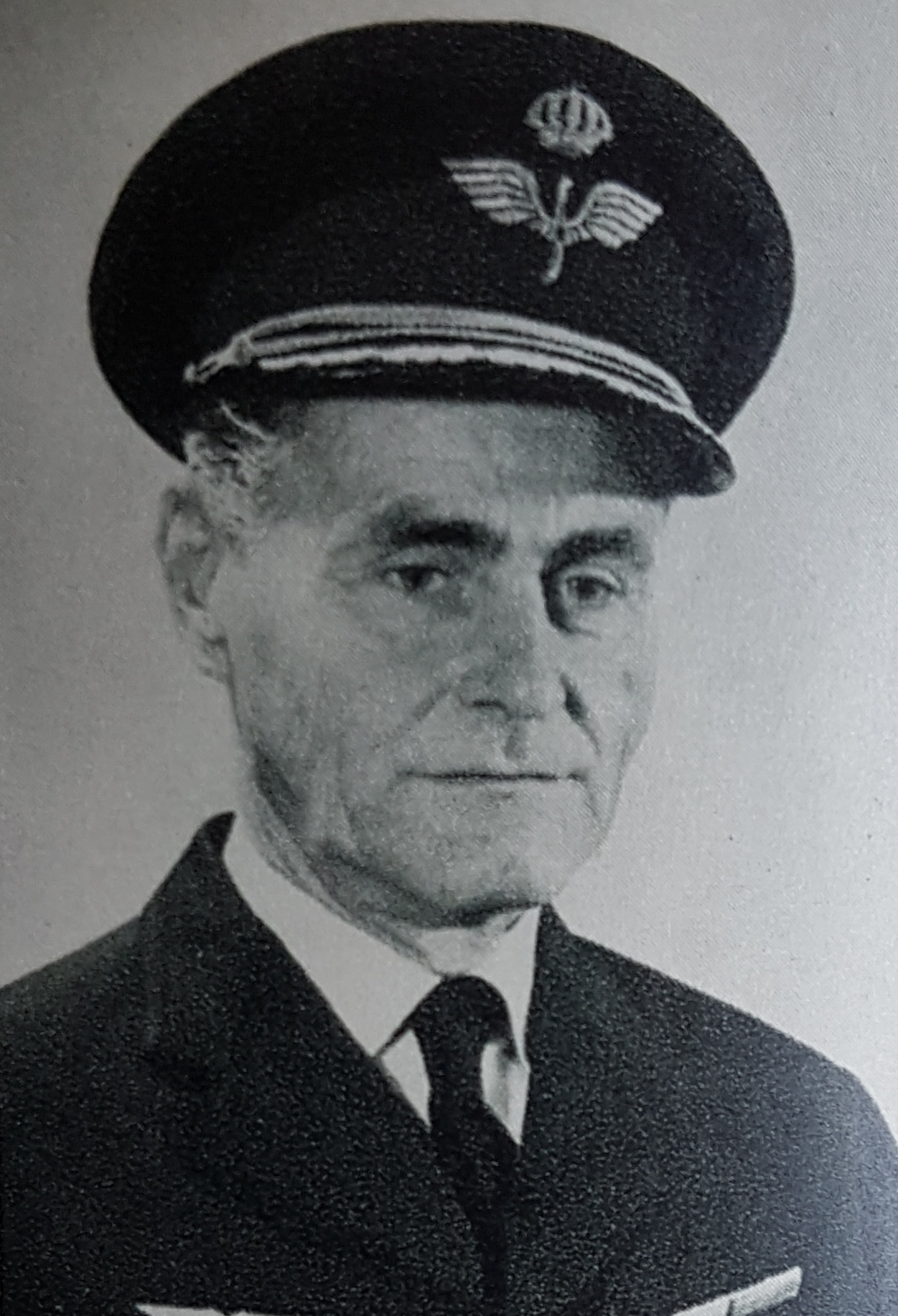
- Born: Ingvar Oskar Daniel Berg; 10 October 1905; Stockholm, Sweden
- Died: 2 July 1993 (aged 87); Haverdal, Sweden
- Military career
- Allegiance: Sweden
- Branch: Swedish Air Force
- Service years: 1926–1967
- Rank: Major General
- Commands: Swedish Air Force Squadron Leader School; Skaraborg Wing; Västmanland Wing; 4th Air Command; 2nd Air Command; Head of Contingent at NNSC

Ingvar Berg
Personal information
- Born: 10 October 1905 Stockholm, Sweden
- Died: 2 July 1993 (aged 87) Haverdal, Sweden

Sport
- Sport: Modern pentathlon
- Club: A1 IF, Stockholm

Major General Ingvar Oskar Daniel Berg (10 October 1905 – 2 July 1993) was a Swedish Air Force officer and modern pentathlete who finished fourth at the 1928 Summer Olympics.

== Early life ==
Berg was born on 10 October 1905 in Stockholm, Sweden, the son of major Rudolf Berg and his wife Ingrid Westermark. Berg passed studentexamen in Karlstad in 1924.

== Career ==
Berg was commissioned as an officer in Svea Artillery Regiment in 1926 with the rank of Fänrik. He attended the higher course at the Artillery and Engineering College from 1930 to 1932 and conducted special studies at the Royal Institute of Technology from 1933 to 1934. Berg then transferred to the newly created Swedish Air Force where he became in lieutenant in 1936. He was promoted to captain in 1937 and served as a teacher at the Artillery and Engineering College from 1938 to 1940. Promoted to major in 1942, Berg then served as a teacher at the Royal Swedish Air Force Staff College from 1943 to 1944 and as commanding officer of the Swedish Air Force Squadron Leader School (Flygvapnets bomb- och skjutskola). He was promoted to lieutenant colonel in 1944.

In 1945, Berg was appointed commanding officer of Skaraborg Wing from 1945 to 1950. He was promoted to colonel in 1947 and served as commanding officer of Västmanland Wing from 1950 to 1954 and of the 4th Air Command (Fjärde flygeskadern, E 4) from 1954 to 1957. In 1957, Berg was appointed commanding officer of the 2nd Air Command and the year after he was promoted to major general. He left the position in 1966 and then from 1966 to 1967, Berg headed the Swedish contingent at the Neutral Nations Supervisory Commission (NNSC) in Korea. Berg retired from the military in 1967 and then headed the Flygvapnets personaldelegation ("Swedish Air Force Personnel Delegation") from 1967 to 1974.

== Personal life ==
In 1933, Berg married Ulla Frydén (born 1907), the daughter of lieutenant colonel Einar Frydén and Gertrud Heyman. They had three children: Ingrid (born 1938), Sven (born 1940) and Eva (born 1944).

== Dates of rank ==
=== Army ===
- 1926 – Second lieutenant
- 1928 – Underlöjtnant
- 1931 – Lieutenant

=== Air Force ===
- 1936 – Lieutenant
- 1937 – Captain
- 1942 – Major
- 1944 – Lieutenant colonel
- 1947 – Colonel
- 1958 – Major general

== Awards and decorations ==
=== Swedish ===
- (Sweden) Commander 1st Class of the Order of the Sword (18 November 1954)
- (Sweden) Knight of the Order of Vasa

=== Foreign ===
- (Liberia) Grand Officer of the Humane Order of African Redemption
- Commander of the Order of the Star of Ethiopia
