= Southern Military Region (Sweden) =

- Södra militärregionen
- Active: 2013–present
- Country: Sweden
- Allegiance: Swedish Armed Forces
- Branch: Joint
- Type: Military region
- Role: Operational, territorial and tactical activities
- Part of: Swedish Armed Forces Headquarters (Note: In the years 2013–2019, the military region staff was subordinate to the commander of the South Scanian Regiment, and since 2020 its directly subordinate to the Chief of Home Guard.)
- Garrison/HQ: Revingeby

Commanders
- Current commander: COL Johan Mohlin (acting)

The Southern Military Region (Swedish: Södra militärregionen, MR S) is a Swedish military region within the Swedish Armed Forces. Established in 2013, the military region staff in based in Revingeby. The military region includes Skåne County, Blekinge County, Kronoberg County, Jönköping County, Kalmar County and Östergötland County.

== History ==
The Southern Military Region was formed on 1 January 2013 as Military Region South, as one of four military regions in Sweden. The military region includes Skåne County, Blekinge County, Kronoberg County, Jönköping County, Kalmar County and Östergötland County. The region's staff is located in Revingeby with the task of leading surveillance and protection tasks, implementing civil-military cooperation and support to society. The Southern Military Region is also responsible for leading the production of the training groups and the Home Guard units in south of Sweden. The responsibility involves both training personnel for the Home Guard units and leading them in operations. The Southern Military Region's Home Guard battalions are 11 in number. On 1 October 2018, a separate command position was appointed for Military Region South. From 2019, the name Southern Military Region was adopted. From 1 January 2020, all military regions are independent units subordinate to the Chief of Home Guard. In doing so, the regions also take over the command in peacetime from the training groups with their Home Guard battalions. Each military region has production management responsibility. This meant that five training groups were transferred to the Southern Military Region. In a government's bill, however, the Swedish government emphasized that the military regional division could be adjusted, depending on the outcome of the investigation Ansvar, ledning och samordning inom civilt försvar ("Responsibility, leadership and coordination in civil defense").

== Units ==
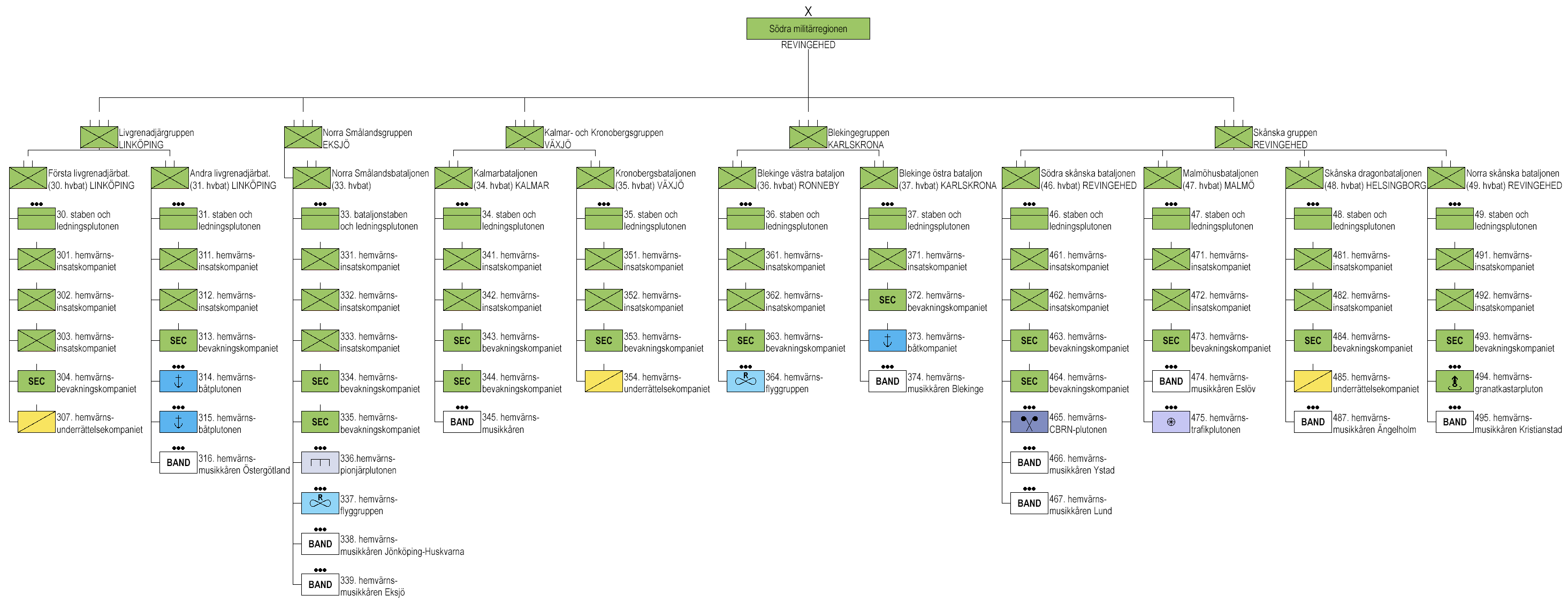
Southern Military Region organization as of April 2026 (click to enlarge)

- Livgrenadjärgruppen (LVG)
  - 30th Home Guard Battalion/1st Life Grenadier Battalion
  - 31st Home Guard Battalion/2nd Life Grenadier Battalion
- Norra Smålandsgruppen (NSG)
  - 33rd Home Guard Battalion/Northern Småland Battalion
- Kalmar och Kronobergsgruppen (KRAG)
  - 34th Home Guard Battalion/Kalmar Battalion
  - 35th Home Guard Battalion/Kronoberg Battalion
- Blekingegruppen (BLG)
  - 36th Home Guard Battalion/Western Blekinge Battalion
  - 37th Home Guard Battalion/Eastern Blekinge Battalion
- Skånska gruppen (SKG)
  - 46th Home Guard Battalion/South Scanian Battalion
  - 47th Home Guard Battalion/Malmöhus Battalion
  - 48th Home Guard Battalion/South Dragoon Battalion
  - 49th Home Guard Battalion/North Scanian Battalion

== Heraldry and traditions ==
=== Coat of arms ===
Blazon of the coat of arms of the Central Military Region: "Azure, a wyvern or, armed and langued gules. The shield surmounting an erect sword or."

== Commanding officers ==
From 2013 to 2017, the military region commander was also commander of the Norrbotten Regiment. From 2018 to 2020, military region commander was subordinate to the Chief of Joint Operations in territorial activities as well as in operations. Furthermore, the military region commander has territorial responsibility over his own military region and leads territorial activities as well as regional intelligence and security services. From 1 January 2020, all military region commanders are subordinate to the Chief of Home Guard.

- 2013–2015: Colonel Michael Nilsson
- 2015–2015: Lieutenant colonel Peter Nilsson (Note: Peter Nilsson took over as acting commander on 3 August 2015, with an appointment no later than 30 September 2015.)
- 2015–2017: Colonel Stefan Smedman (Note: Stefan Smedman took over as commander on 30 September 2015, with an appointment no later than 30 September 2019.)
- 2017–2018: Lieutenant colonel Peter Nilsson (acting) (Note: Peter Nilsson took over as acting commander on 1 September 2017, with an appointment no later than 28 February 2018.)
- 2018–2021: Colonel Jan Pålsson (Note: Pålsson took over as commander on 1 January 2018, with an appointment no later than 30 November 2020.)
- 2021–2025: Colonel Per Nilsson (Note: Nilsson took over as commander on 16 December 2021, with an appointment no later than 31 December 2024.)
- 2025–present: Colonel Johan Mohlin (acting) (Note: Nilsson took over as acting commander on 4 February 2025, with an appointment no later than 31 July 2025.)

== Names, designations and locations ==
Name	Translation	From		To
Militärregion Syd	Military Region South	2013-01-01	–	2018-12-31
Södra militärregionen	Southern Military Region	2019-01-01	–	
Designation		From		To
MR V		2013-01-01	–	
Location		From		To
Revingeby		2013-01-01	–	

== See also ==
- Southern Military District (Milo N)
