= Kalmar Wing =

Coordinates: 56.6761°N 16.2858°E

- Kalmar flygflottilj
- Active: 1942–1980
- Country: Sweden
- Allegiance: Swedish Armed Forces
- Branch: Swedish Air Force
- Type: Wing (1940–1957); Sector wing (1957–1978); Wing (1978–1980)
- Role: Fighter wing
- Part of: 1st Air Command (1942–1948); 2nd Air Command (1948–1966); Southern Military District (1966–1980)
- Garrison/HQ: Kalmar
- March: "Kalmar flygflottiljs marsch" (Hartog) (Note: The march was never officially established for the wing.)

Insignia
- Roundel

Aircraft flown
- Bomber: B 4, B 5, B 17C
- Fighter: J 21A, J 21B, J 29A, J 32B, J 35F
- Reconnaissance: 14
- Trainer: Sk 12, Sk 14, Sk 15, Sk 16 Sk 50
- G 101, S 102, Se 103, Se 104, P 1

Kalmar Wing (Swedish: Kalmar flygflottilj), also F 12 Kalmar, or simply F 12, is a former Swedish Air Force wing with the main base located on the south-east coast of Sweden.

== History ==
The wing started out with three squadrons of B 17C in 1942.

In 1947, F 12 was converted to a fighter wing by replacing the light bombers with the J 21A-2 which were upgraded to -3 before they were obsolete.

Through 1952 to 1953, the three wings replaced the J 21's with J 29As which were only kept for five years until they were replaced by the J 32B Lansen in 1958. However, one of the squadrons were decommissioned after only two years.

In 1962, the Air Force Meteorology School moved to F 12 Kalmar from F 2 Hägernäs.

The two squadrons were upgraded to J 35F in 1968 which were kept until the decommissioning of the wing in 1980.

The base with the meteorology school continued to operate under the F 17K name as a detachment to Blekinge Wing (F 17) until 1983 when the school moved to the Swedish Air Force Flying School.

The airfield has been used for general and commercial aviation as Kalmar Airport (IATA: KLR, ICAO: ESMQ) since 1980.

== Heraldry and traditions ==
=== Coat of arms ===
Blazon: "Argent, the town badge of Kalmar, from a waved base azure a tower embattled gules, gate and window or issuant between two etoiles gules."

=== Colours, standards and guidons ===
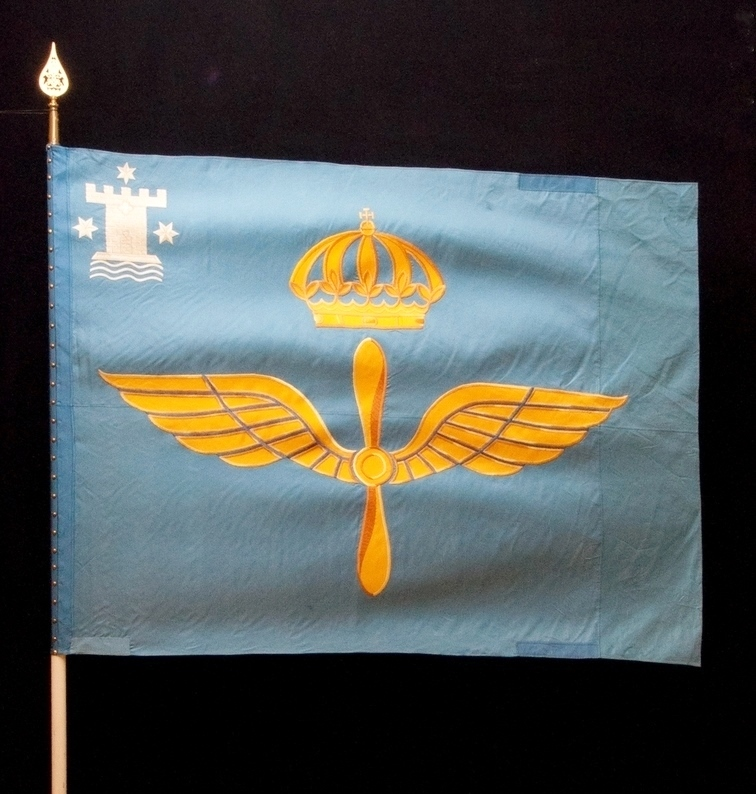
Colour

A colour was presented to the wing on 17 September 1944 at F 8 in Barkarby by His Majesty the King Gustaf V. The colour is preserved at Blekinge Wing. Blazon: "On blue cloth in the centre the badge of the Air Force; a winged two-bladed propeller under a royal crown proper. In the first corner from a waved base a yellow tower embattled issuant between two mullets".

=== March ===
”Kalmar flygflottiljs marsch” was composed by Bo Hartog, the wing's music director. It has not been officially established.

== Commanding officers ==
Commanding officers from 1942 to 1980. The commanding officer was referred to as flottiljchef ("wing commander") and had the rank of colonel. From 1976 to 1978, the wing commander was referred to as sektorflottiljchef ("sector wing commander"). The deputy sector wing commander was sometimes referred to as wing commander.

- 1942–1954: Ragnar Carlgren
- 1954–1966: Thomas Stålhandske
- 1966–1970: Gunnar Rissler
- 1970–1972: Carl-Gustaf Simmons
- 1972–1980: Fritz Crona

== Names, designations and locations ==
Name	Translation	From		To
Kungl. Kalmar flygflottilj	Royal Kalmar Wing	1942-07-01	–	1974-12-31
Kalmars flygflottilj	Kalmar Wing; Kalmar Air Group	1975-01-01	–	1980-06-30
Designation		From		To
F 12		1942-07-01	–	1957-09-30
F 12/Se S2		1957-10-01	–	1978-??-??
F 12		1978-??-??	–	1980-06-30
Location		From		To
Törneby		1942-07-01	–	1980-06-30
Kalmar Airport		1942-07-01	–	1980-06-30

== See also ==
- Swedish Air Force
- List of military aircraft of Sweden
