= Northern Air Defence District =

Air defence district in the Swedish Air Force (1943–1957)

- Norra flygbasområdet
- Active: 1943–1957
- Country: Sweden
- Allegiance: Swedish Armed Forces
- Branch: Swedish Air Force
- Type: Air defence district
- Role: Operational, territorial and tactical operations
- Garrison/HQ: Östersund

The Northern Air Defence District (Swedish: Norra flygbasområdet, Flybo N) was an air defence district within the Swedish Air Force that operated from 1943 to 1957. The unit was based in Östersund. It was responsible for air base and supply service as well as for air defence warning service in Middle Norrland and North Middle Sweden.

== History ==
According to the Defence Act of 1942, Sweden was divided territorially into five air defence districts. The eastern and Upper Norrland air defence districts were established on 1 July 1942, the others a year later. The task of the air defence districts was to be responsible for the air base and supply service within the respective area, after 1948 also for air defence warning service. The task was also to maintain the administration of training sites and wartime airfields as well as facilities and depots at these in peacetime, as well as to prepare the Swedish Air Force's basing in war.

The Northern Air Defence District included Kopparberg County of the V Military District, and the II Military District except Älvkarleby, Lövsta and Tierp police superintendent districts and Umeå Defence District of the VI Military District.

The Northern Air Defence District and the air defence district organisation ceased on 1 October 1957. The duties were taken over by the air commands (flygeskader).

== Tasks ==
The main duties of the air defence district commanders during peacetime were war preparation work, including planning of the base and supply service as well as air defence warning service, as well as voluntary training for the air defence warning service, as well as management of training airfields and certain supply depots.

The main tasks in war were to lead the base and supply service within the air defence district as well as to command the grouped base units, regarding the depots in terms of their use as bases for combat air units, as well as to lead the air defence warning service and to command the air defence warning service units.

Base service operations (mainly ground service) were aimed at ensuring the operations of combat air units and preparing their operations in the air. The base service included station service, air traffic control, ground air defence and ground defence (in cooperation with certain forces from the army), signal service, military camp and provision, medical care, transport and airfield repairs (some) and snow removal.

== Commanding officers ==
Commanding officers:

- 1943–1944: Colonel Björn Bjuggren (acting)
- 1944–1954: Colonel Herman Sundin
- 1954–1956: Colonel Ragnar Carlgren

== Names, designations and locations ==
Name	Translation	From		To
Norra flygbasområdet	Northern Air Defence District	1942-10-01	–	1957-09-30
Designation		From		To
Flybo N		1942-10-01	–	1957-09-30
Location		From		To
Östersund Garrison		1942-10-01	–	1957-09-30
