= Kalmar Airport =

Kalmar Airport Kalmar flygplats

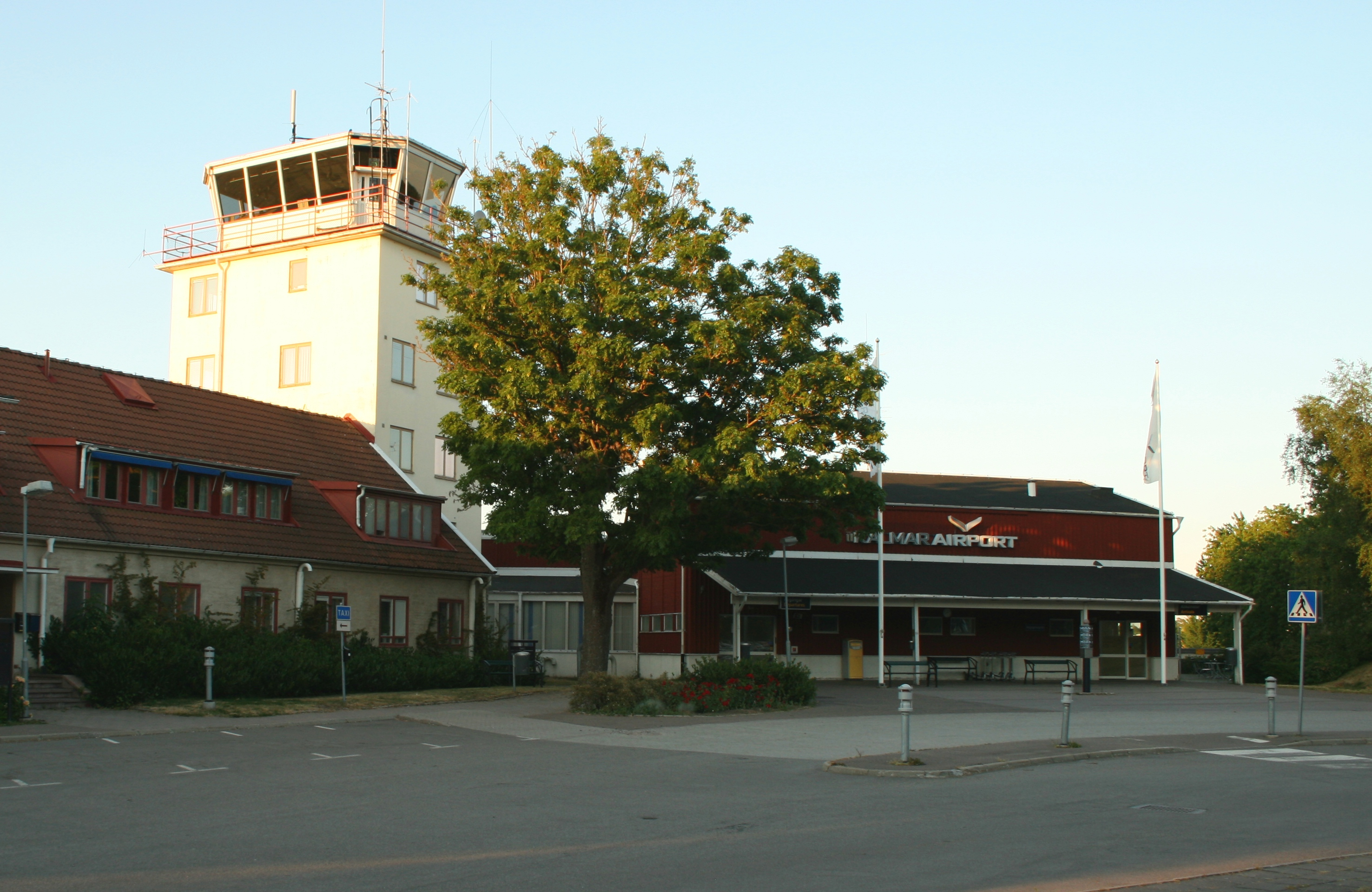
- IATA: KLR; ICAO: ESMQ

Summary
- Airport type: Public
- Operator: Kalmar Municipality
- Serves: Kalmar County and Öland
- Location: Kalmar
- Elevation AMSL: 17 ft (5.2 m)
- Coordinates: 56°41′07″N 16°17′15″E

Map
- Location of airport in Sweden

Runways
Direction	Length		Surface
Direction	ft	m	Surface
05/23	2,179	664	Asphalt
16/34	6,726	2,050	Asphalt

Statistics (2018)
- Passengers total: 243,271
- International passengers: 40,410
- Domestic passengers: 202,861
- Landings total: 5,888

Kalmar Airport (IATA: KLR, ICAO: ESMQ), branded as Kalmar Öland Airport, is an airport in south-eastern Sweden. The airport is located 5 kilometres west of downtown Kalmar. The airfield was originally the home of the Kalmar Wing (F 12). The airport is owned by Kalmar Municipality and Kalmar County.

== Airlines and destinations ==
The following airlines operate regular scheduled and charter flights at Kalmar Airport:

Airlines	Destinations
Scandinavian Airlines	Stockholm–Arlanda
TUI fly Nordic	Seasonal charter: Gran Canaria (begins 29 October 2026)Rhodes (22 April 2026 to 7 October 2026)

== See also ==
- Transport in Sweden
- List of the largest airports in the Nordic countries
