= Military subdivisions of Sweden =

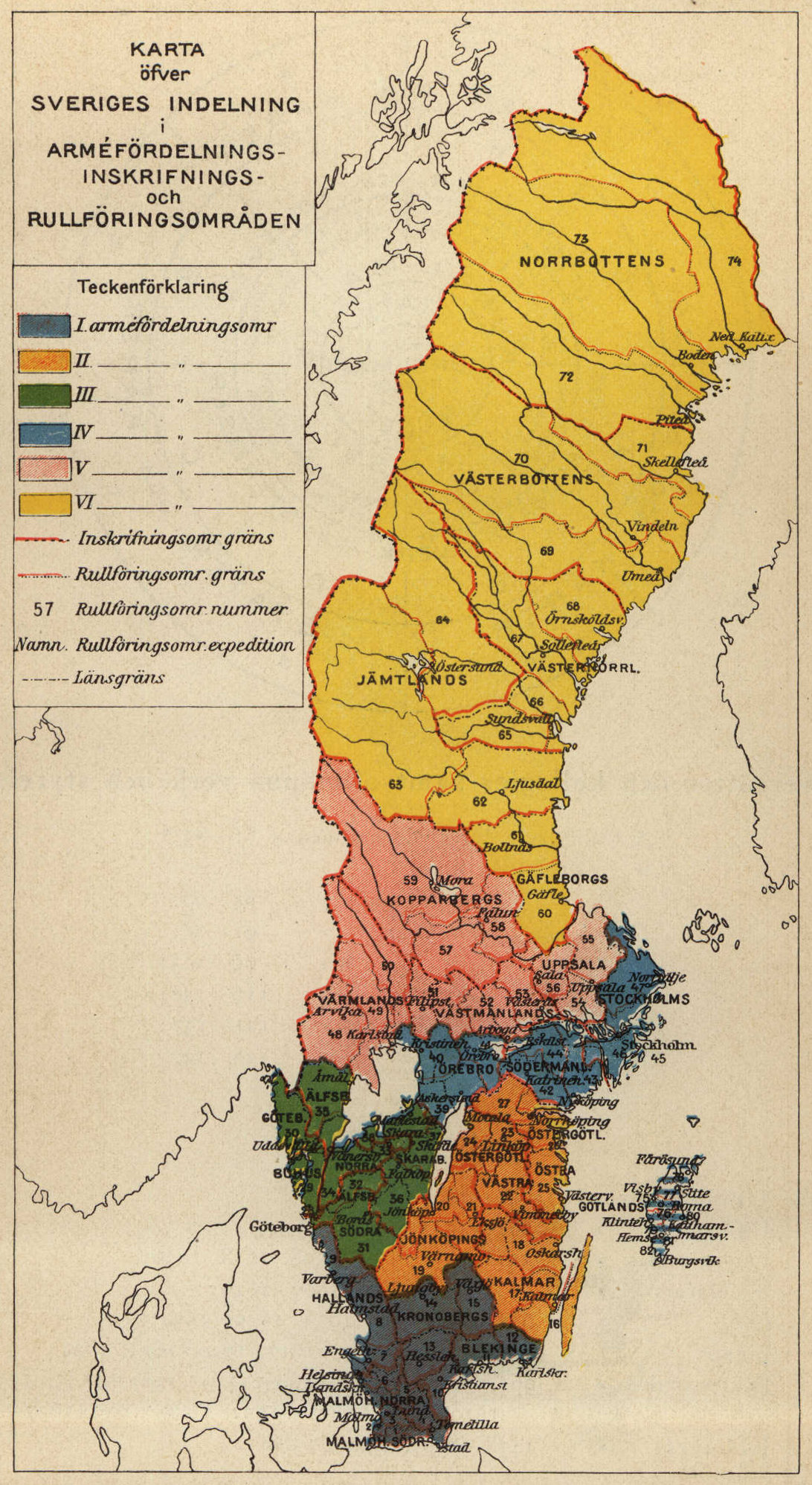
Military subdivisions of Sweden in 1908.

The military subdivisions of Sweden refers to the division of Sweden's territory with regard to the command possibilities, mainly in war. The subdivisions are different depending on Sweden's military doctrine. The subdivision can apply to both land and sea territory. On 1 January 2013, the Swedish Armed Forces re-established regional staffs, dividing the country into four military regions. A fifth military region was formed in 2019.

== Air Force ==
=== Air defence district (1942–1957) ===
Air defence district (Swedish: Flygbasområde, Flybo) was introduced in 1943 when five air defence districts were given responsibility for war-time air bases and storehouses and from 1948 also for air surveillance. The air defence districts were disbanded in 1957 and the tasks were taken over by the air group staffs (eskaderstaberna), whose tasks were in turn taken over by the air defence sectors (luftförsvarssektorerna).

The air defence districts consisted of the Upper Norrland Air Defence District (Flybo ÖN), Northern Air Defence District (Flybo N), Eastern Air Defence District (Flybo O), Western Air Defence District (Flybo V) and the Southern Air Defence District (Flybo S).

=== Air defence sector (1957–1994) ===
Air defence sector (Swedish: Luftförsvarssektor, Lfs) replaced air defence district in 1957. A division of Sweden into 21 air defence sectors was introduced in 1951. It would form the basis for the expansion of the new air surveillance and combat command system, which later came to be called STRIL 50. However, the expansion plan was never implemented but was replaced already in 1954 with a new expansion plan reduced to 11 sectors. On 1 October 1957, an air defence sector organization was introduced with a sector chief and sector staff. The air defence sectors and sector staffs were during peace-time linked to a fighter wing and the wing commander also became sector commander (sector wing commander). In 1981, four "large sectors" were formed instead. These were in turn replaced by three air commands in 1994.

=== Air command (1994–2000) ===
Air command (Swedish: Flygkommando, FK) replaced air defence sectors in 1994. On 1 July 1994, the sector organization was transformed into an air command organization.

The air commands consisted of the Northern Air Command (FKN) - covered former sector NN and ÖN; Central Air Command (FKM) - covered former sector center; Southern Air Command (FKS) - covered former sector south. The Air Force Command (FTK) was formed on 1 July 2000 as part of the Joint Forces Command (OPIL) at the Swedish Armed Forces Headquarters. The commander of FTK was also Inspector General of the Air Force.

== Army ==
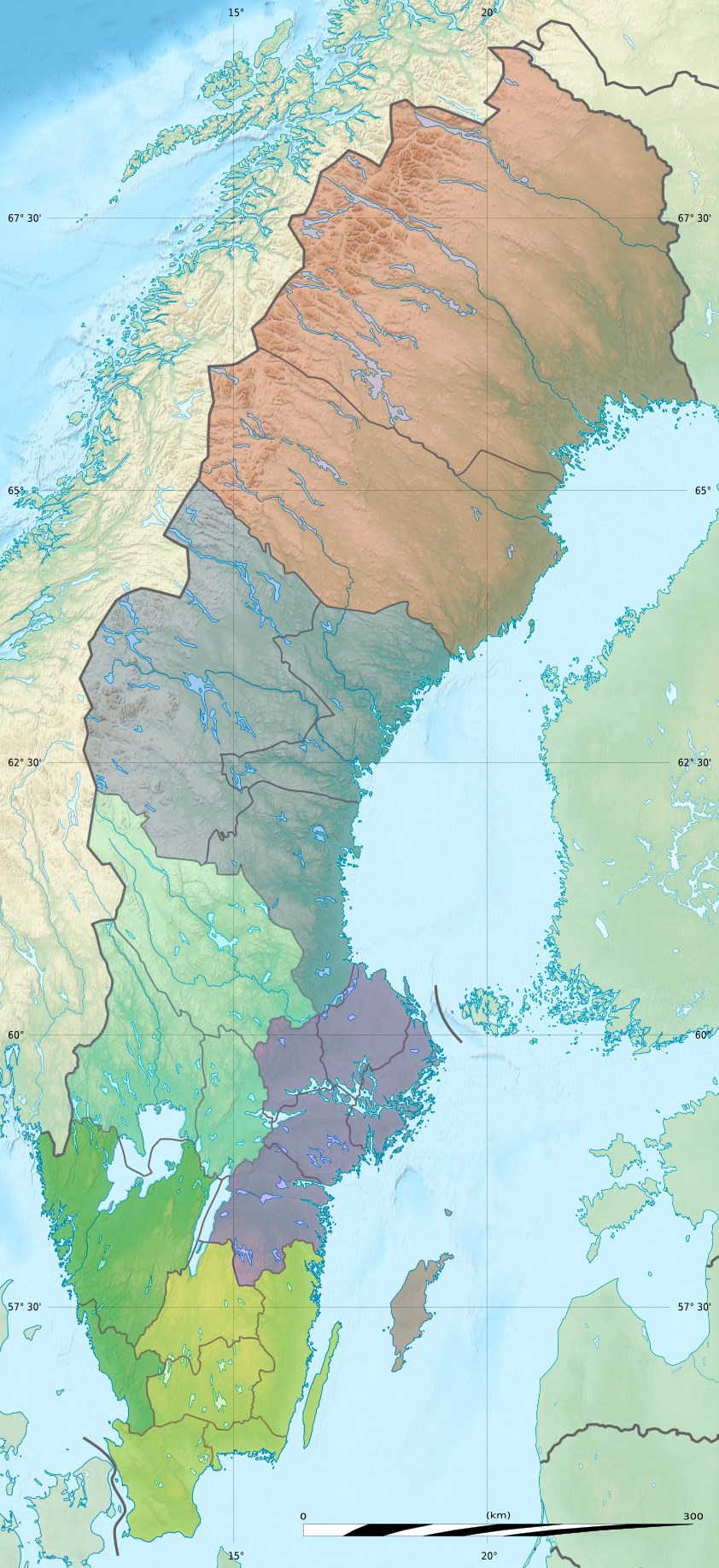
Swedish military districts and military command locations in 1989

=== Defence district (1914–1918, 1939–2000) ===
Defence district (Swedish: Försvarsområde, Fo) was an administrative division of the Swedish Armed Forces, and was a lower regional level subdivision, usually corresponding to a Swedish county. The commander of a defence district was the Defence District Commander, who usually commanded local defence units, including infantry, engineers, air defence and light artillery, as well as any Home Guard units in the district. The commander answered to the larger military district that the defence district was part of.

=== Military district ===
==== Militärdistrikt (1833–1893) ====
Military district (Swedish: Militärdistrikt, MD) is part of Sweden's military-territorial division. The military districts were established in 1833 and were, after several reorganizations (1847, 1867 and 1889), replaced by army divisions in 1893.

==== Militärområde (1942–2000) ====
Military district (Swedish: Militärområde, Milo) (Note: Militärområde is translated as "military district" but also as "military command".) were multi-service commands of the Swedish Armed Forces, created in 1942. The commander of a military district, the Militärområdesbefälhavare (also called Militärbefälhavare (Note: Militärbefälhavare (MB) can be translated as "Commanding General of Military Command", "Military Commander", "Service Commander", or "Commanding General")), commanded the Swedish Army divisions stationed in the region, the regional naval command, the regional air defence sector as well as the lower regional subdivision defence districts that made up the military district. The commander answered directly to the Supreme Commander. The military districts in the modern form were created in 1966, and each district was named according to the geographical district they covered. Several changes were made, such as creating or merging districts, until all military districts were disbanded in 2000.

==== Militärdistrikt (2000–2005) ====
Military district (Swedish: Militärdistrikt, MD) replaced through the Defence Act of 2000 the old organisation on 1 July 2000. It was active until 31 December 2005. The new military districts geographically corresponded to the old military districts, but did not have territorial and operational tasks.

=== Military command (1966–2000) ===
Military command (Swedish: Militärkommando, MK) existed in two forms from 1966 to 2000. Gotland Military Command (MKG) was organized in 1966 as a joint lower regional resource within the Eastern Military District (Milo Ö). The West Coast Military Command with Älvsborg Coastal Artillery Regiment (MKV/KA 4) existed between 1981 and 1986 when it was reorganized into the West Coast Naval Command (MKV).

=== Security and Cooperation Sections (2005–2013) ===
Security and Cooperation Sections (Swedish: Säkerhets- och samverkanssektioner, SäkSam sekt) were organized in 2005 following the disbandment of the military districts. At regional and local level, collaboration would take place through these sections. The sections' tasks include coordinating the military security service regionally and cooperating with regional and local authorities. The sections were located in Stockholm, Gothenburg, Malmö and Boden. The four sections were commanded by the head of the Swedish Armed Forces Headquarters. From 1 January 2013, these sections were replaced by four military regions.

=== Military region (2013–present) ===
Military region (Swedish: Militärregion, MR) replaced the Security and Cooperation Sections. Sweden is divided into four military regions: Northern, Central, Western and Southern. Each region has a staff whose task is to lead efforts in national crisis situations and support to society. In national crisis situations, it is the responsibility of the regional staffs to coordinate the military effort with the rescue efforts of other authorities. Another of the regional staffs' areas of responsibility is to handle surveillance and protection tasks. Both war and Home Guard units can be involved in national efforts and support for society. During the operations, the units are under the regional staff. The staffs, in turn, are subordinated to the Joint Forces Command in the Swedish Armed Forces Headquarters. A fifth military region, Gotland Military Region (Militärregion Gotland, MR G) was formed in 2019.

== Navy ==
=== Naval station/station (1773–1955) ===
Naval station, or Station (Swedish: Örlogsstation, or Station) was a concept used for Karlskrona Station (1773–1937), Karlskrona Naval Station (Karlskrona örlogsstation, ÖSK) (1937–1955), Stockholm Station (1824–1937), Stockholm Naval Station (Stockholms örlogsstation, ÖSS) (1937–1955), Gothenburg Station (Göteborgs station) (1824–1854) and Gothenburg Naval Station (Göteborgs örlogsstation) (1943–1955).

=== Naval district (1928–1957, 1993–2000) ===
Naval district (Swedish: Marindistrikt, MD) was introduced in accordance with the Defence Act of 1925. In 1928, six regional command and maintenance bodies for the navy were organized within each coastal section. The naval districts were transferred to naval commands in 1957 and were given operational responsibility (higher regional level). The naval districts consisted of the South Coast Naval District (MDS), the Öresund Naval District (Öresunds marindistrikt, MDÖS), the West Coast Naval District (MDV), the East Coast Naval District (MDO), Gotland Naval District (MDG) and the Norrland Coast Naval District (Norrlandskustens marindistrikt, MDN).

=== Naval command (1957–1966, 1986–2000) ===
Naval command (Swedish: Marinkommando, MK) replaced naval district in 1957. The naval commands were transferred from the naval districts in 1957 and given operational responsibility (higher regional level) and replaced the naval stations. In 1966, the new and from then on integrated military district (militärområde) were established, which took over some of the tasks of the naval commands. Other tasks were transferred at the same time to the then newly established naval bases (lower regional level). In 1981–1990, the naval bases amalgamated with the coastal artillery defences (kustartilleriförsvar) and formed new naval commands - now, however, at a lower regional level.

The naval commands consisted of Naval Command South (MKS), Naval Command West (MKV), Naval Command East (MKO), Norrland Coast Naval Command (Norrlandskustens marinkommando, MKN).

=== Naval base (1966–1990) ===
Naval base (Swedish: Örlogsbas, ÖrlB) replaced naval command in 1966. In 1966, the new and from then on integrated military district (militärområde) were established, which took over some of the tasks of the naval commands. Other tasks were transferred at the same time to the then newly established naval bases (lower regional level). In 1981–1990, the naval bases amalgamated with the coastal artillery defences (kustartilleriförsvar) and formed new naval commands - now, however, at a lower regional level.

The naval bases consisted of the South Coast Naval Base (ÖrlBS), West Coast Naval Base (ÖrlBV), East Coast Naval Base (ÖrlBO), as well as Naval Base North (Örlogsbas Nord, ÖrlBNO)/Roslagen Naval Base Department (Roslagens örlogsbasavdelning, Örlbavd Ro), Lower Norrland Naval Base (Örlogsbas Nedre Norrland, ÖrlBNN).

=== Marinbas (2000–2004) ===
In 2000, the naval regional structure was dismantled and today it is the Naval Base (MarinB), which in principle has taken over what is left of the lower regional structure's naval tasks.

=== Naval district (1951–1993) ===
Naval district (Swedish: Marint bevakningsområde, Bo) and naval bases, is what the naval commands (formed in 1957) were called 1966–1990. The naval districts consisted of Malmö Naval District (Malmö marina bevakningsområde, BoMö) and Luleå Naval District (Luleå marina bevakningsområde, BoLu).

=== Coastal artillery defence (1942–1994) ===
Coastal artillery defence (Swedish: Kustartilleriförsvar) was created in 1942 and replaced the coastal fortresses with these naval defence district - coastal artillery defence - within each naval defence district as follows: Hemsö Coastal Artillery Defence (Hemsö kustartilleriförsvar), Stockholm Coastal Artillery Defence (Stockholms kustartilleriförsvar, SK), Gotland Coastal Artillery Defence (GK/KA 3), Blekinge Coastal Artillery Defence (Blekinge kustartilleriförsvar, BK) and Gothenburg Coastal Artillery Defence (GbK). The units were as follows: Härnösand Coastal Artillery Detachment (KA 4H), Vaxholm Coastal Artillery Regiment (KA 1), Gotland Coastal Artillery Corps (KA 3), Karlskrona Coastal Artillery Regiment (KA 2) and Älvsborg Coastal Artillery Regiment (KA 4).

The coastal artillery defence was mainly organized on staff and administrative bodies as well as brigades, barrier battalions, artillery batteries, barrier and air defence companies, minelayer divisions, maintenance units and independent troops and platoons. These were usually joined by local defence units from the army. In connection with the formation of the new naval commands in 1981–1990, the coastal artillery defences were integrated with the naval bases and together with these were included in the naval commands.

== Royal Engineers ==
=== Fortress ===
Fortress (Swedish: Fästning), sorted for the most part under the War College (and the Army Materiel Administration after 1865) with the exception of Karlskrona Fortress which belonged to the Swedish Navy (1902–42: the Swedish Coastal Artillery), Vaxholm which in 1662–79 belonged to the Admiralty and 1902–1942 to the Coastal Artillery, and Älvsborg which 1904–1942 also belonged to the Coastal Artillery. Of the smaller ones, Dalarö belonged to the Admiralty in 1662–77 and Fårösund, Hemsö and Hörningsholm to the Coastal Artillery.
