= Haverdal =

- Location within Halland Location within Sweden
- Coordinates: 56°43′N 12°40′E
- Country: Sweden
- Province: Halland
- County: Halland County
- Municipality: Halmstad Municipality

Area
  - Total: 3.64 km^{2} (1.41 sq mi)

Population (31 December 2020)
  - Total: 1,821
  - Density: 500/km^{2} (1,300/sq mi)
- Time zone: UTC+1 (CET)
  - Summer (DST): UTC+2 (CEST)

Haverdal is a locality situated in Halmstad Municipality, Halland County, Sweden, with 1,821 inhabitants in 2020.

Haverdal is a tourist attraction in the summer with a 4 km long beach. There is also a large nature reserve with hiking opportunities and nature views.

== History ==
The first time Haverdal is mentioned was in the 1650s, when there were just five farms in Haverdal. In the 1800s stonemasonry started, which caused the population to go from 30 to 500. The depression in the 1930s, however, ended this, and the people had to get new jobs.

There is a trilogy by Albert Olsson detailing the rural population of Haverdal in the 17th century and their battle against loose sand.

== Gallery ==
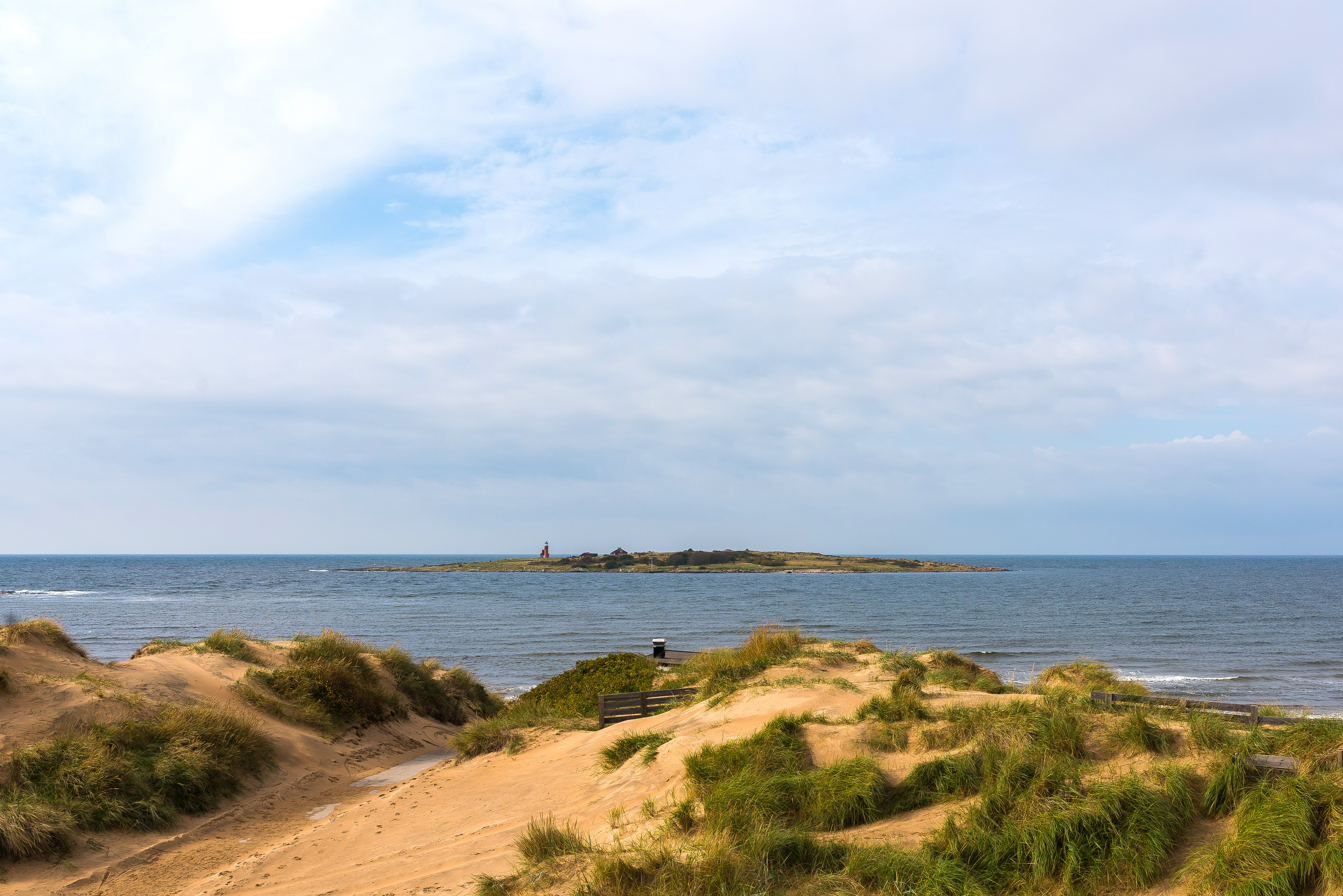

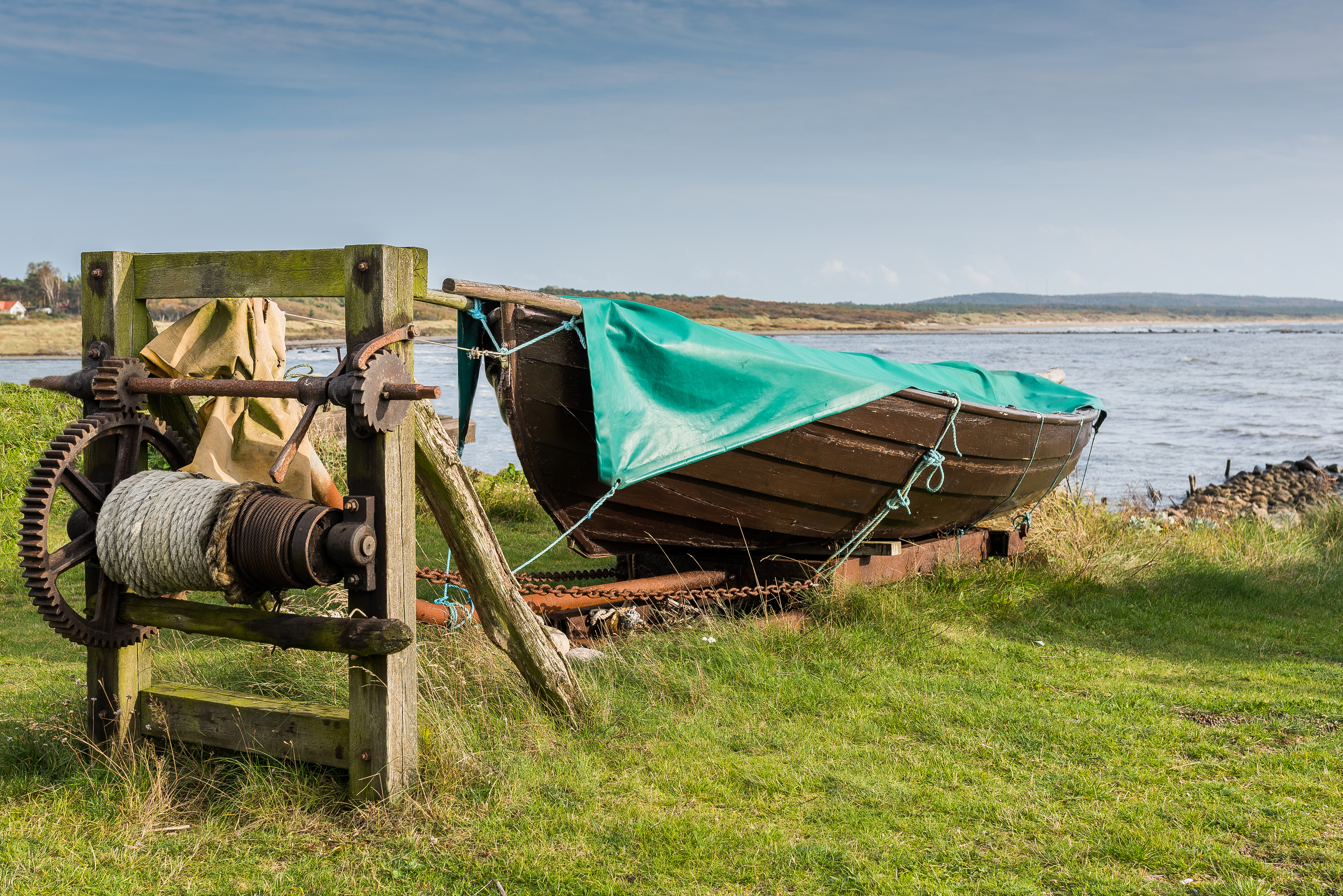

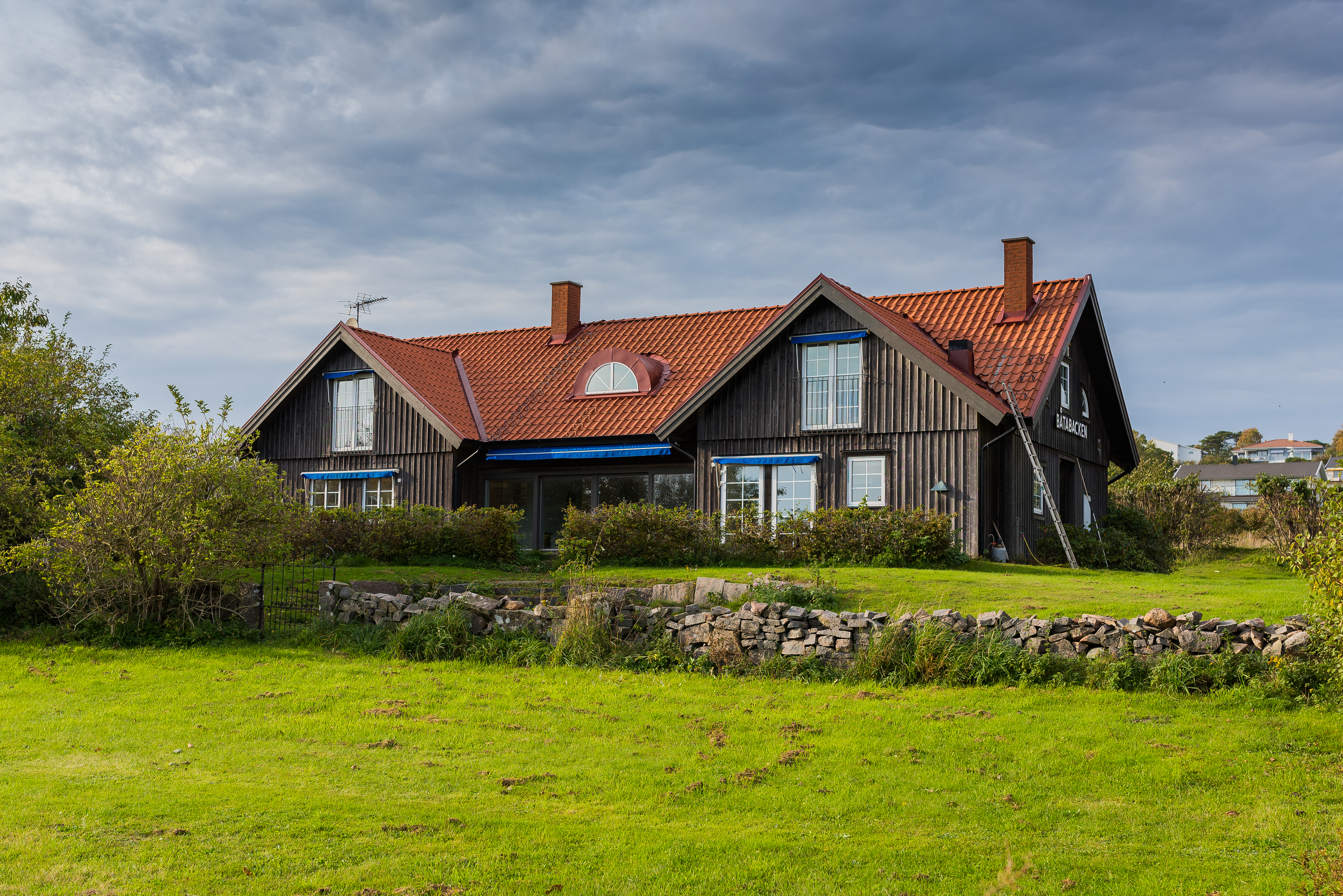

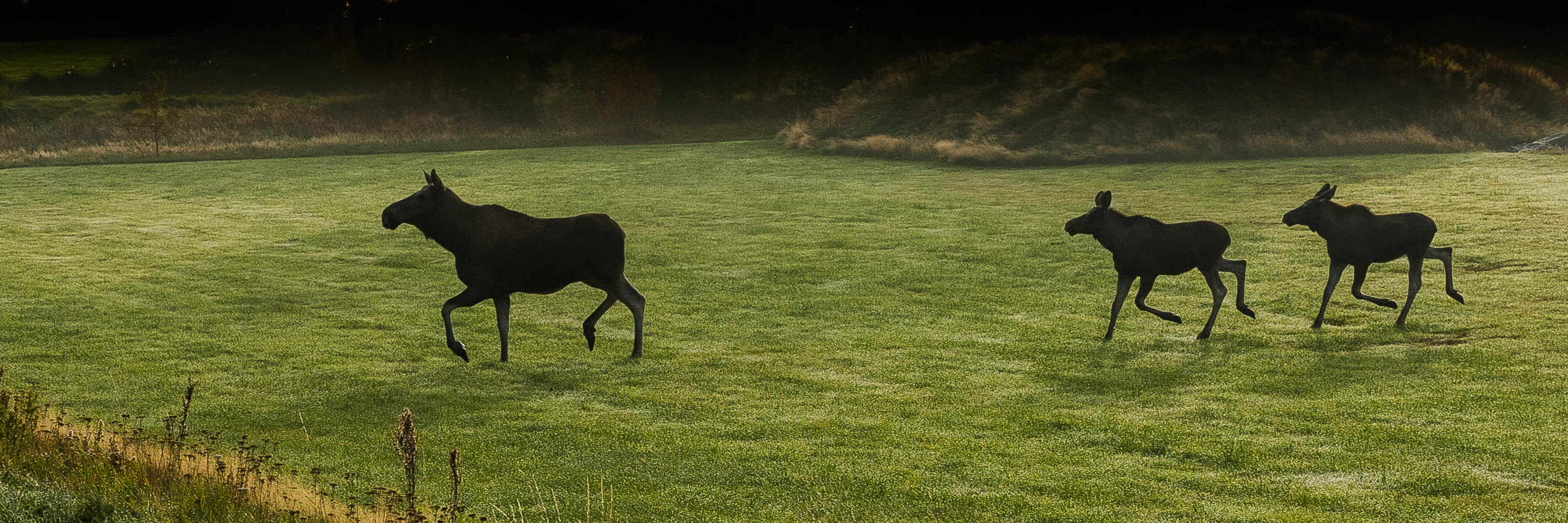

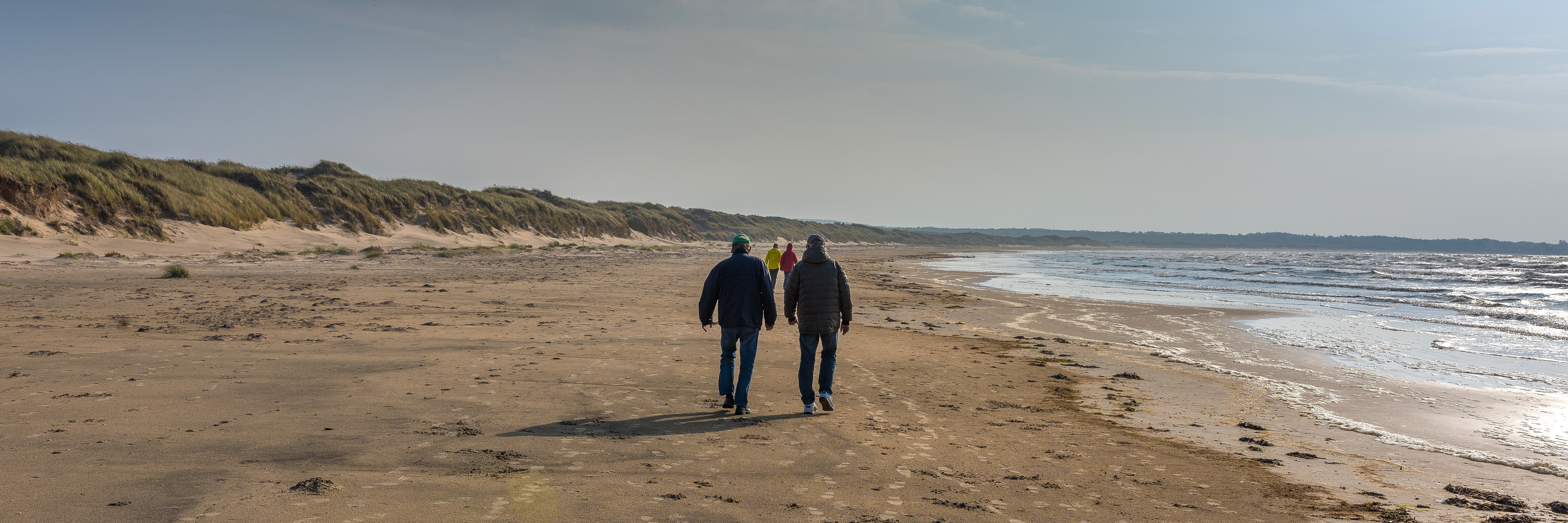
