= Överste =

Swedish and Finnish military rank

Colonel överste
- Country: Sweden
- Service branch: Army; Air Force; Navy (Amphibious Corps)
- Abbreviation: Öv (Swedish), Col (English)
- Rank: Colonel
- NATO rank code: OF-5
- Non-NATO rank: O-6
- Next higher rank: Brigadier general (2000–); Senior colonel (1972–2000); Major general (–1972)
- Next lower rank: Lieutenant colonel
- Equivalent ranks: Captain

Colonel (Col) (Swedish: överste, öv) is the most senior field grade military officer rank in the Swedish Army and the Swedish Air Force, immediately above the rank of lieutenant colonel and just below the rank of brigadier general. It is equivalent to the naval rank of captain in the Swedish Navy.

== History ==
Överste ("Colonel") is the name for the highest regimental officer rank. The name, sometimes in the connection with häröverste ("army colonel") and also generalöverste ("colonel general"), is as old as a standing army, that is, from the end of the Middle Ages. During the 16th and 17th centuries, a famous soldier was commissioned to recruit a regiment and was then appointed colonel at the head of it. The regiment was thus the colonel's belonging; he appointed, among other things, its officers. To the extent that the recruitment was immediately taken over by the state, the colonels began to be appointed by the king as well as the other officers. Even today, the colonel is usually the regimental commander.

The rank of colonel was between the rank of lieutenant colonel and major general until 1972 when senior colonel rank was introduced. Thereafter, colonel was between lieutenant colonel and senior colonel from 1972 to 2000 when the brigadier general rank was introduced. Since 2000, the rank of colonel is between the lieutenant colonel and the brigadier general and the senior colonel (for those who still hold the rank, no new appointments are made) is between colonel and the brigadier general.

== Rank insignia ==
=== Collar patches ===
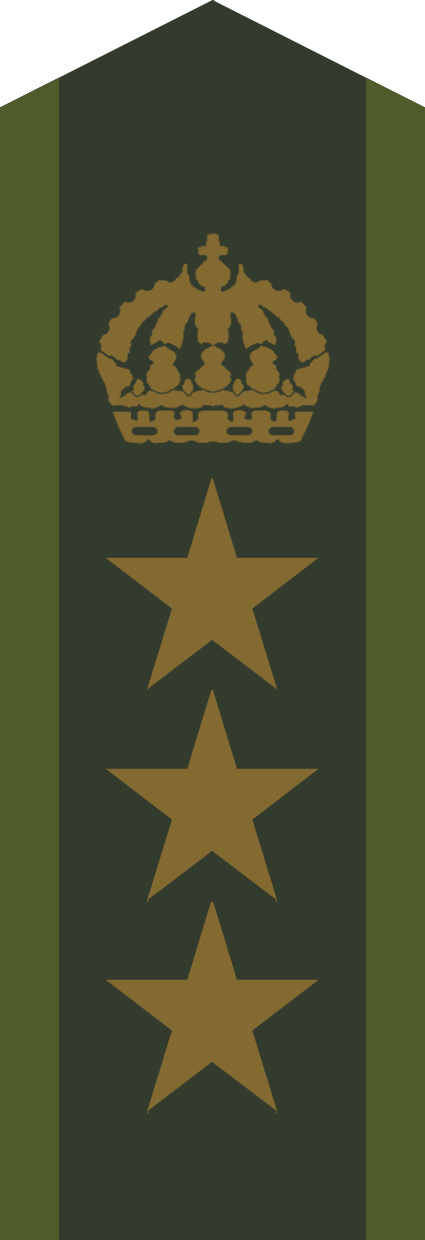
Collar patch m/58 for colonel

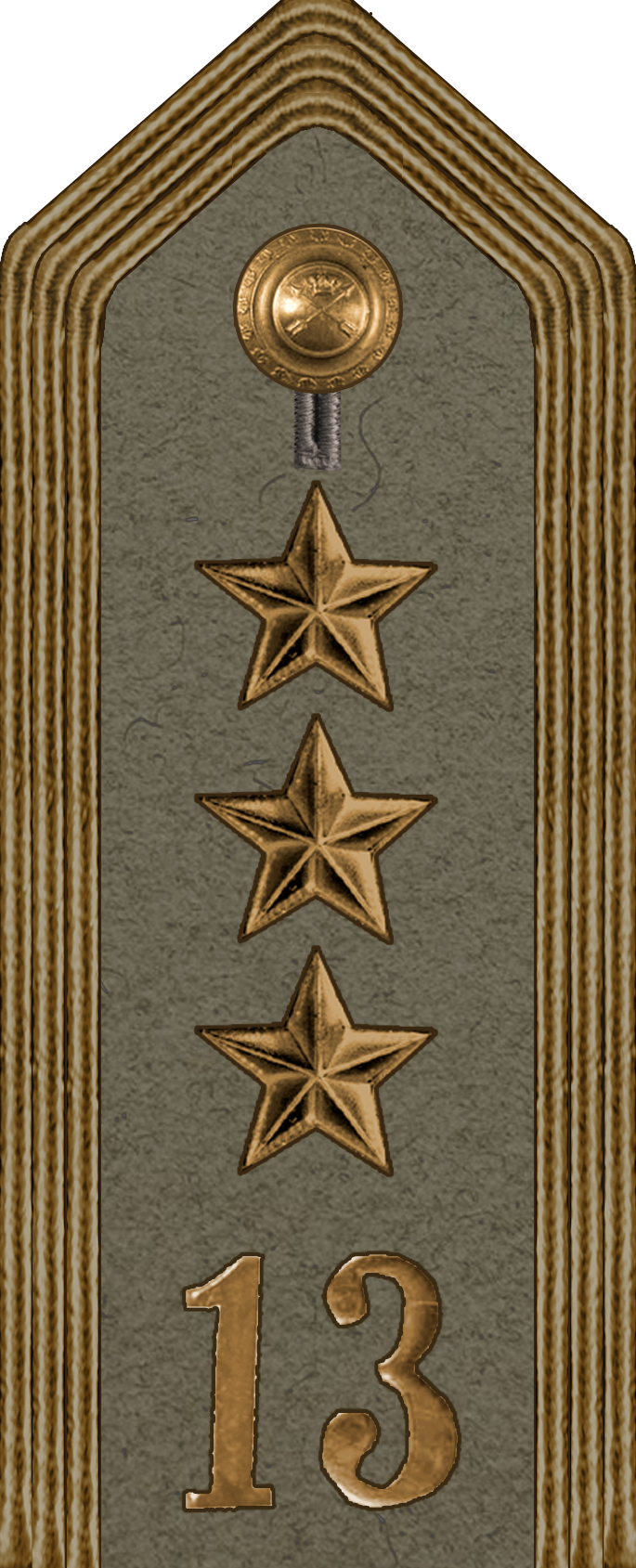
Collar patch

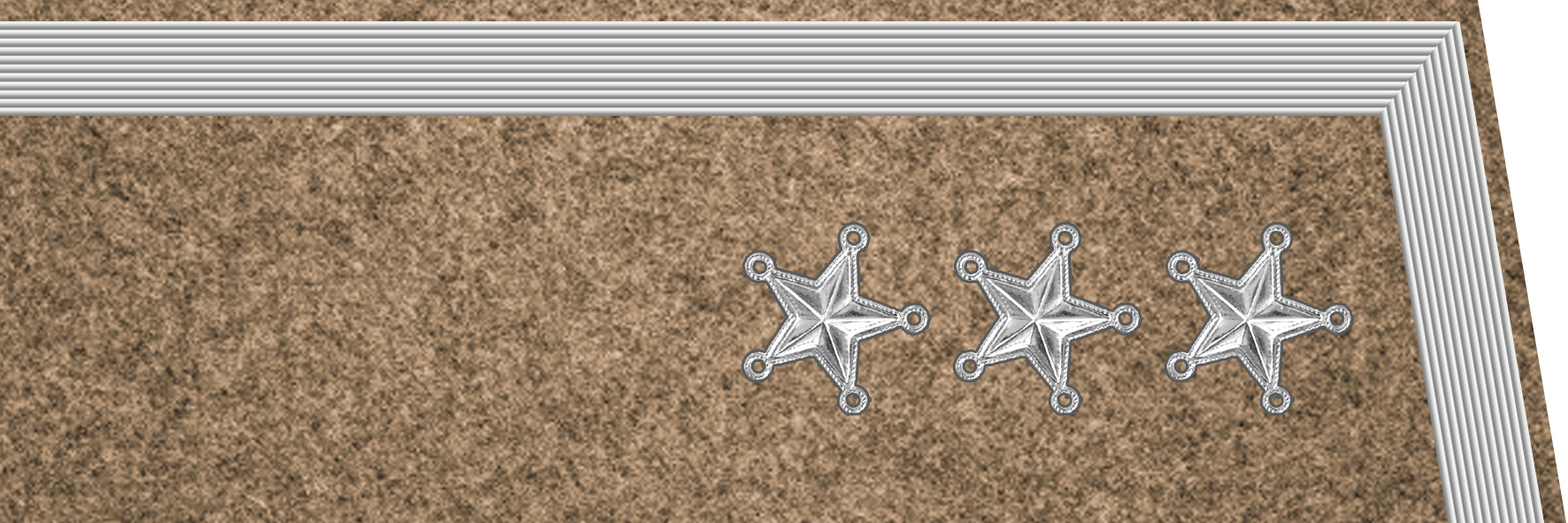
Collar patch

=== Shoulder marks ===
==== Air Force ====
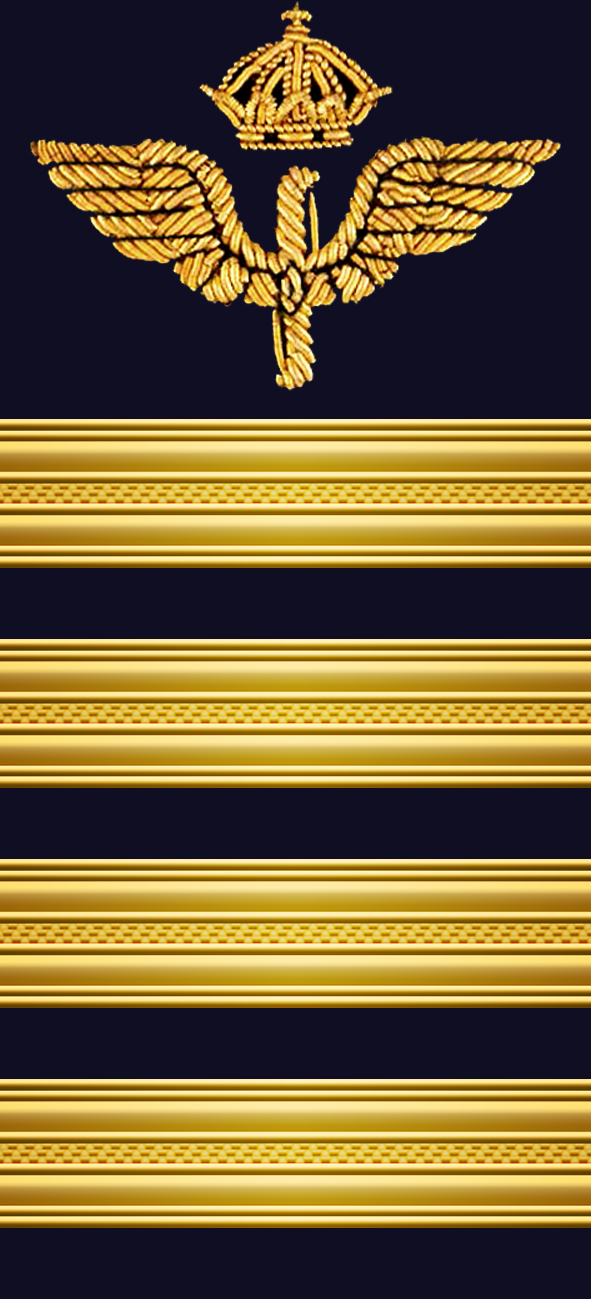
(2000–present)

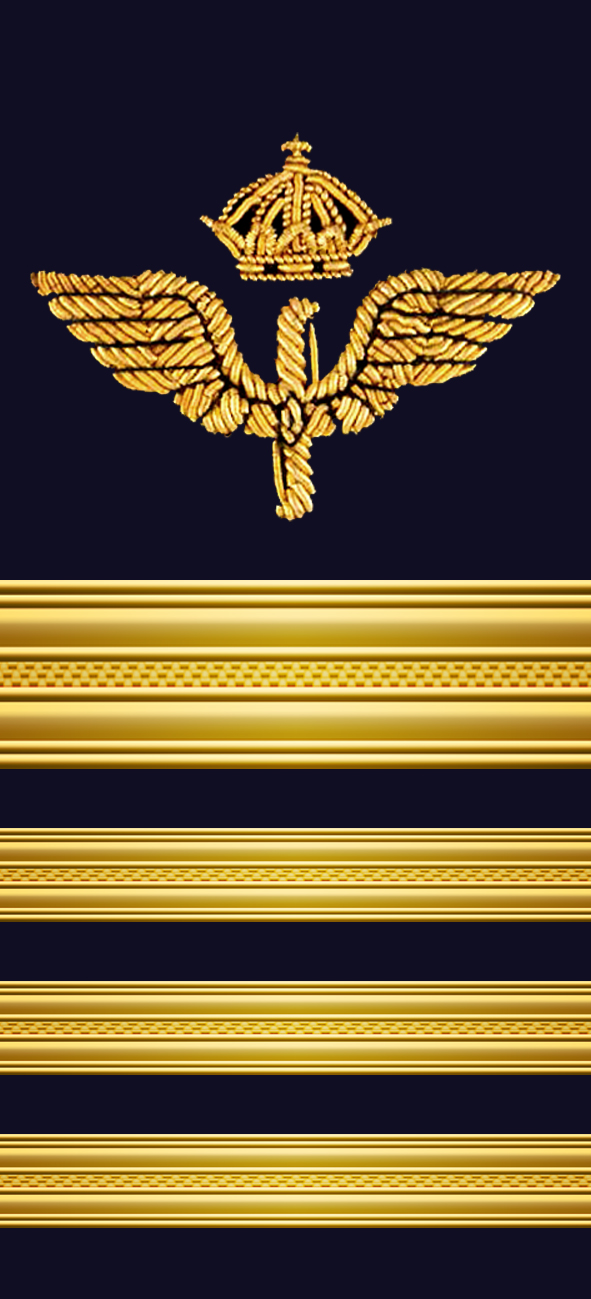
(1987–2000)

==== Army ====
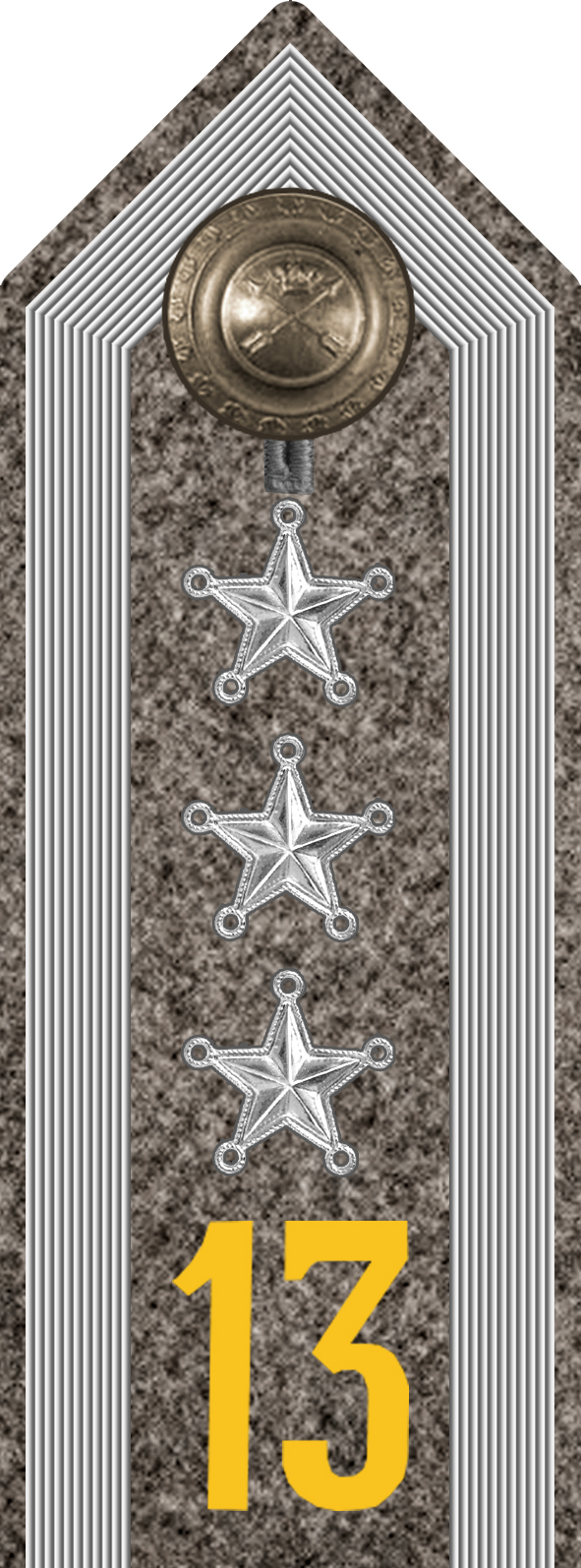
Shoulder mark m/1923
(13 = Dalarna Regiment)

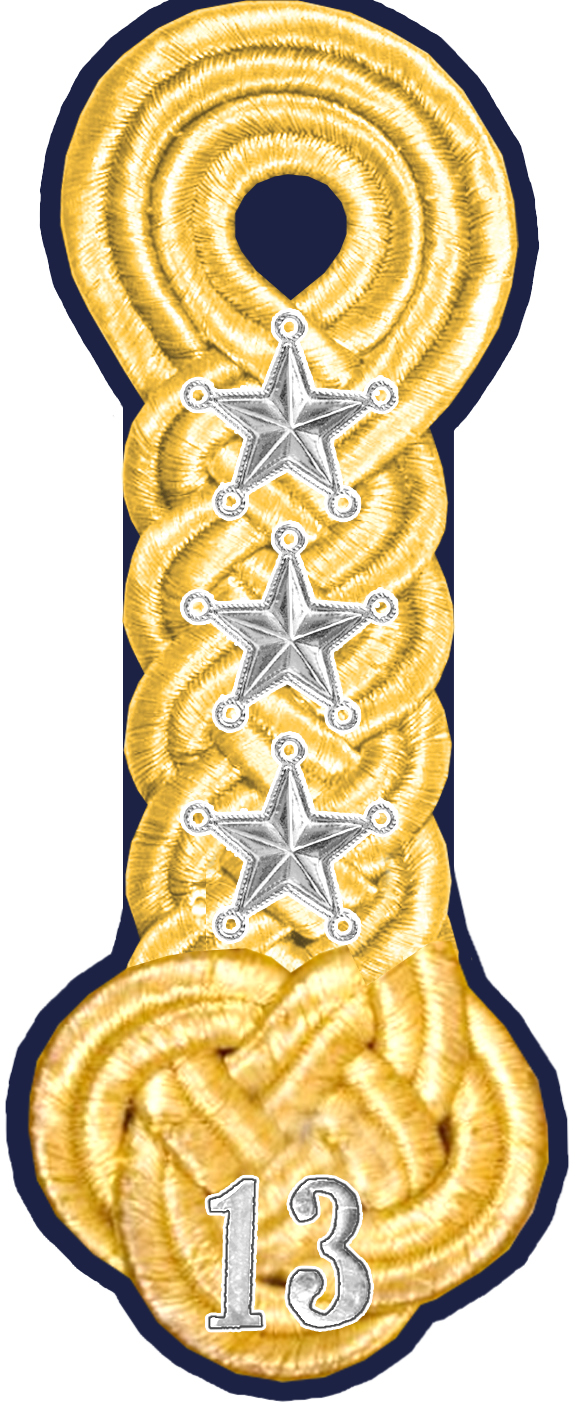
Shoulder mark m/1910
(13 = Dalarna Regiment)

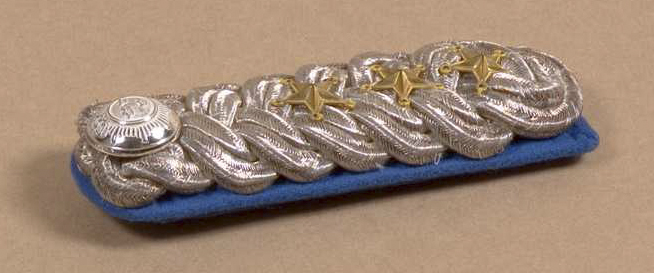
Shoulder mark m/1895 (Service Troops)

==== Navy (Amphibious Corps) ====
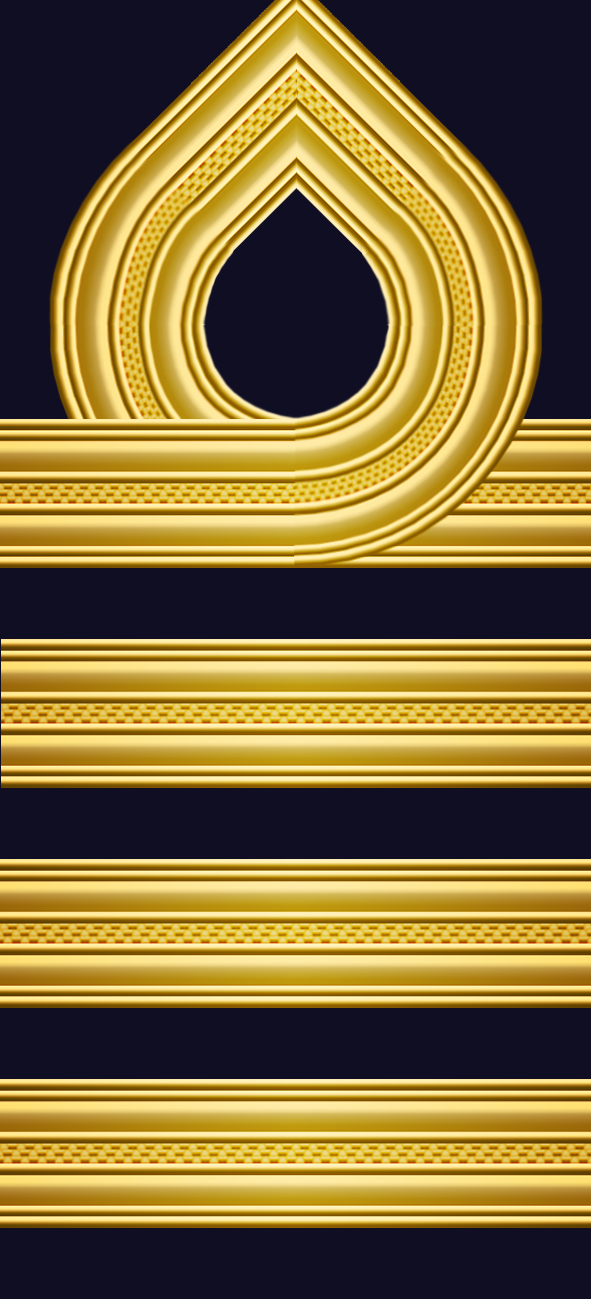
Embroidered shoulder mark (Navy)
(2000–present)

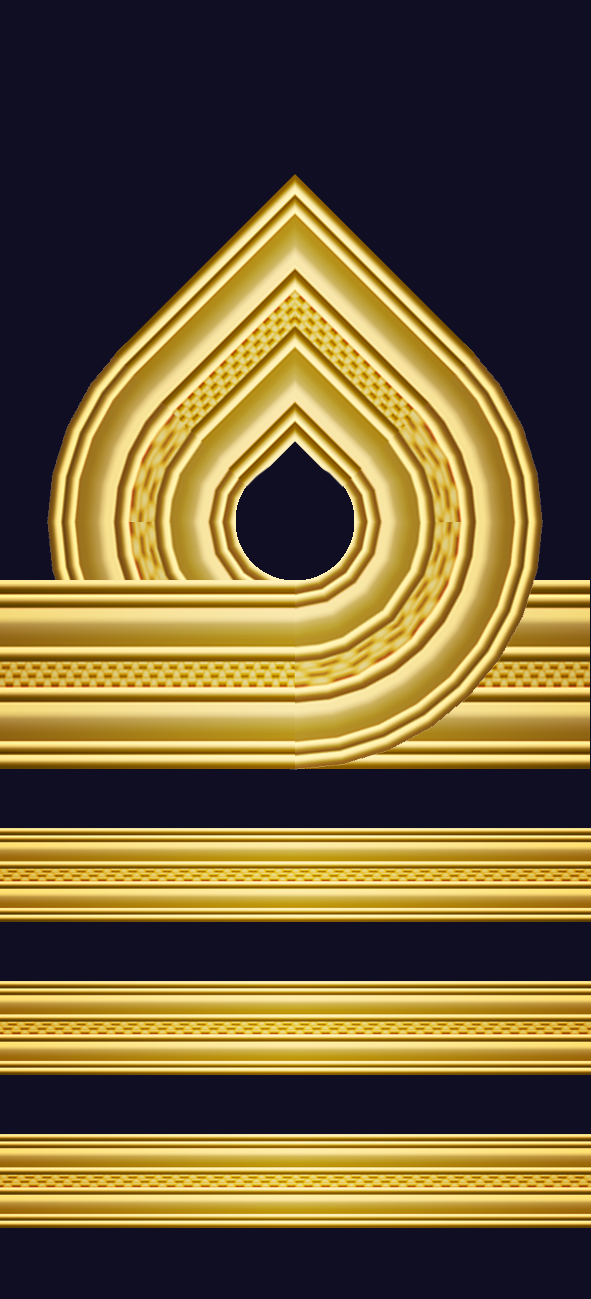
Embroidered shoulder mark (Navy)
(1987–2000)

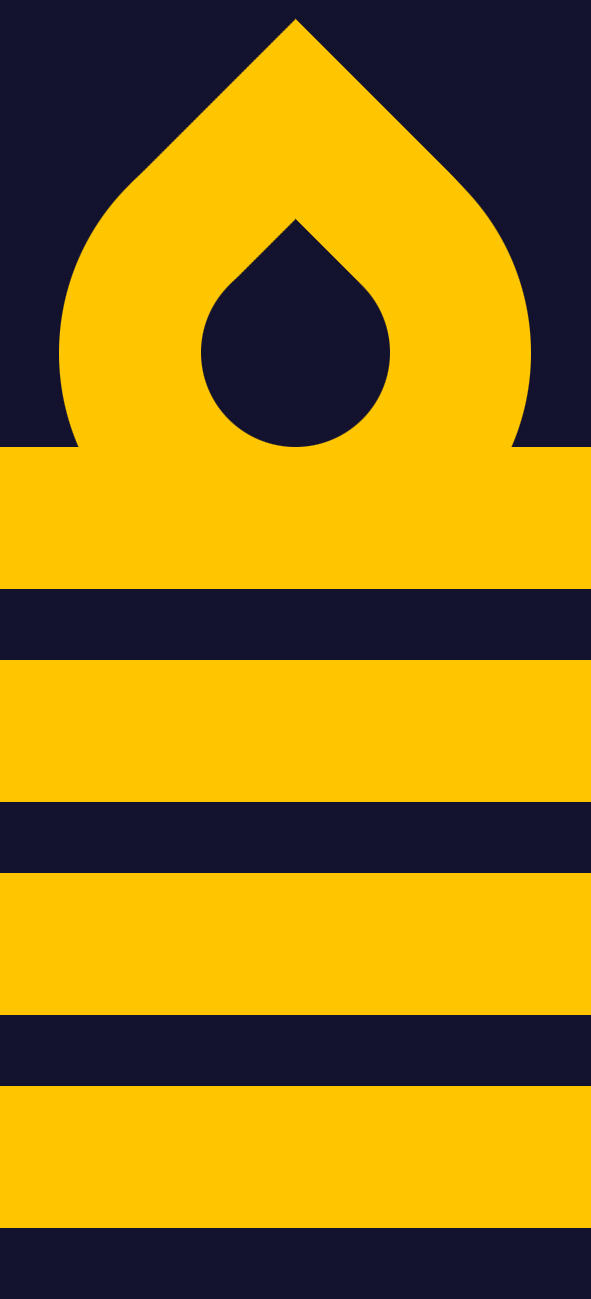
Wowen shoulder mark (2003–present)

=== Sleeve insignias ===
==== Air Force ====
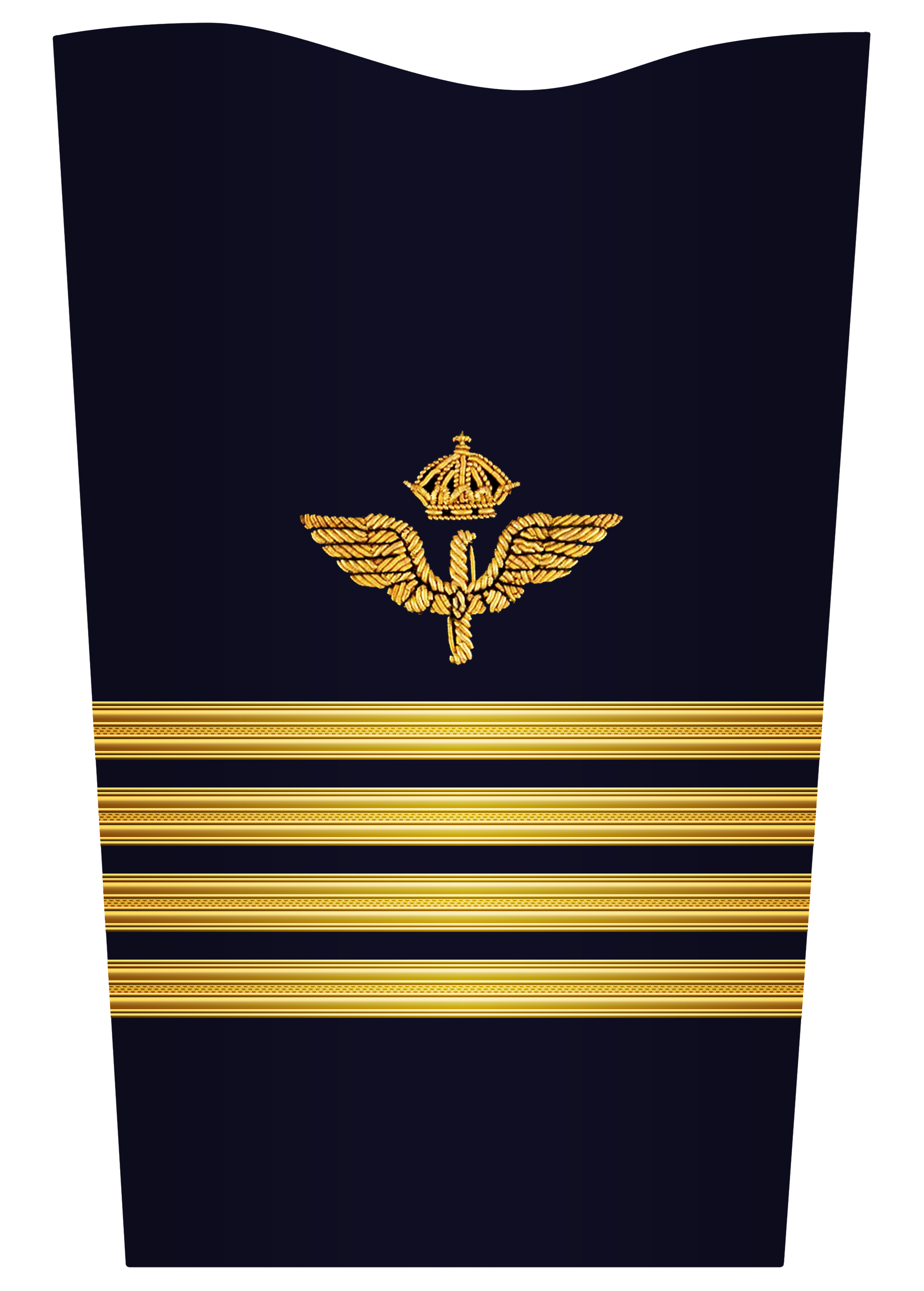
Mess jacket sleeve insignia for a colonel

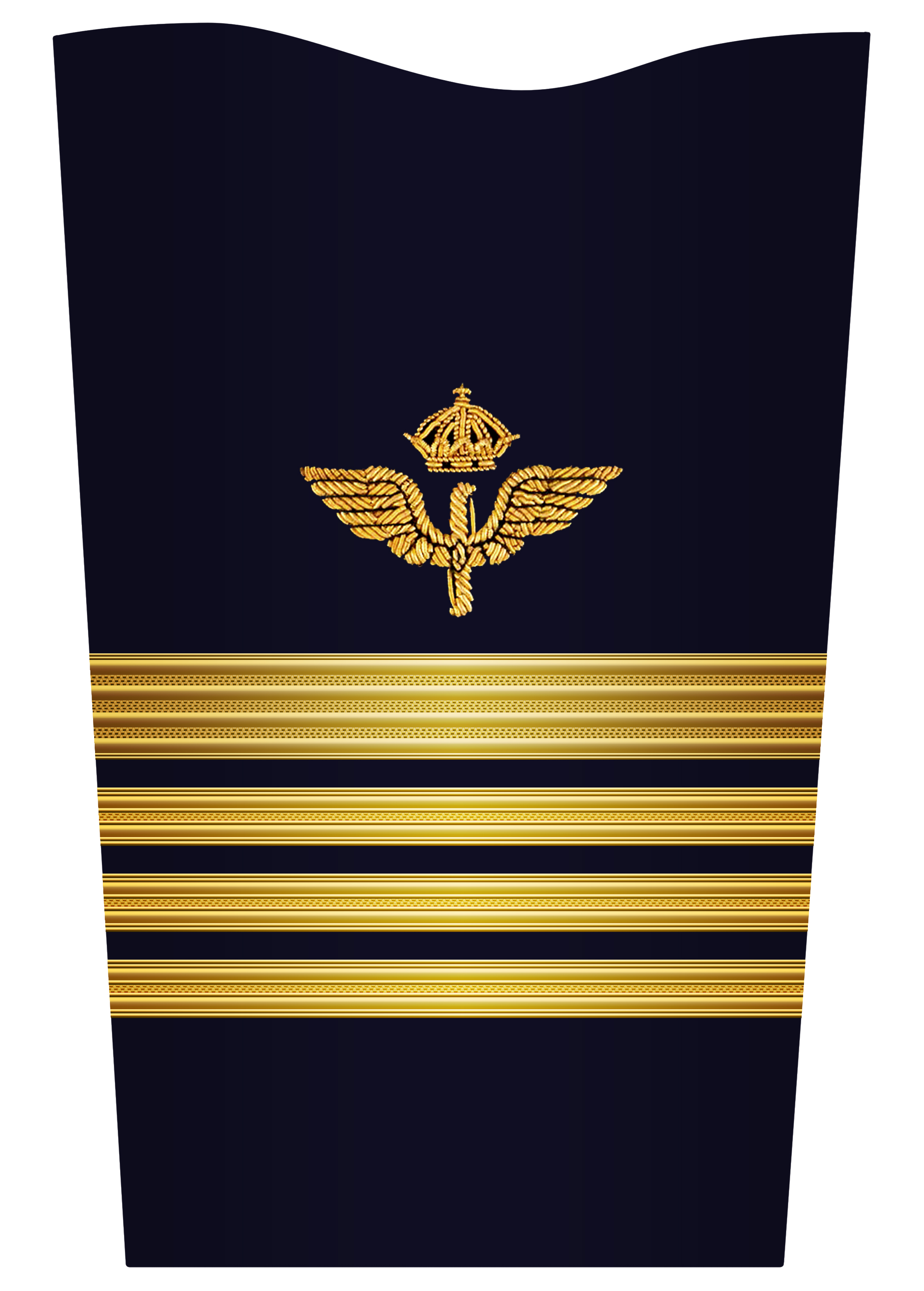
Mess jacket sleeve insignia for a colonel
(–2003)

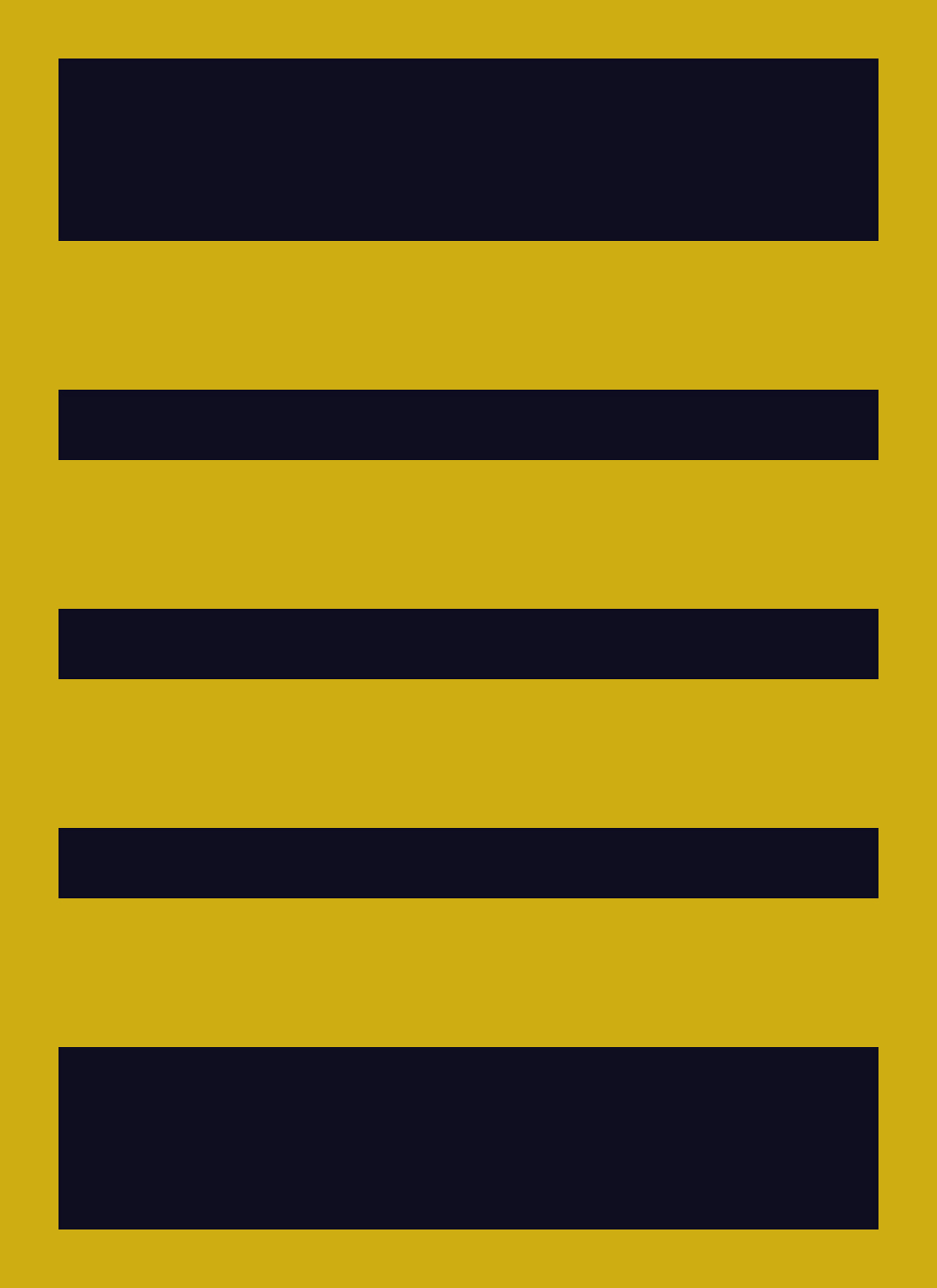
Flight suit sleeve insignia for a colonel
(2000–present)

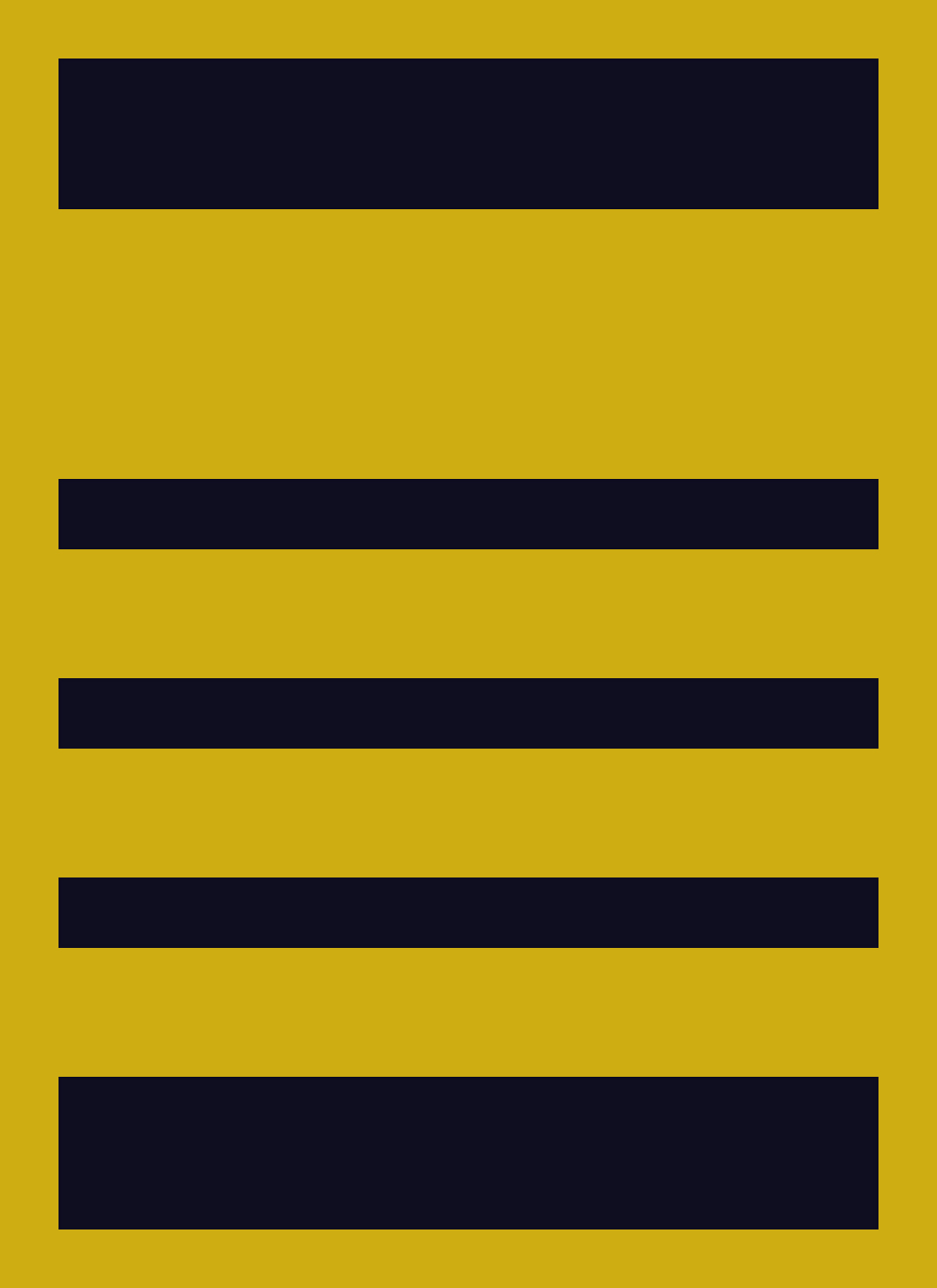
Flight suit sleeve insignia for a colonel
(1987–2000)

==== Army ====
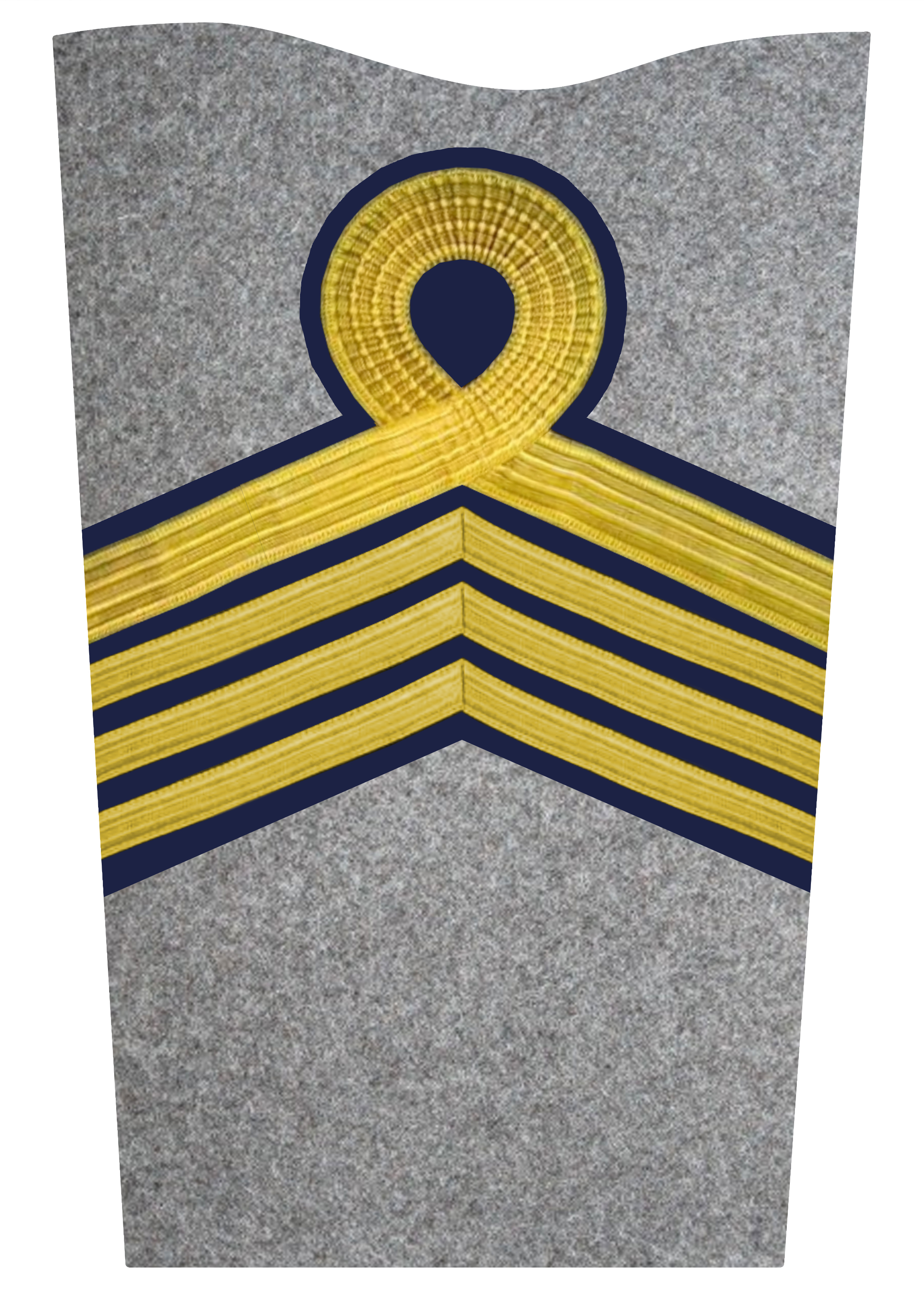
Sleeve insignia on uniform m/1906 for a colonel.

==== Navy (Amphibious Corps) ====
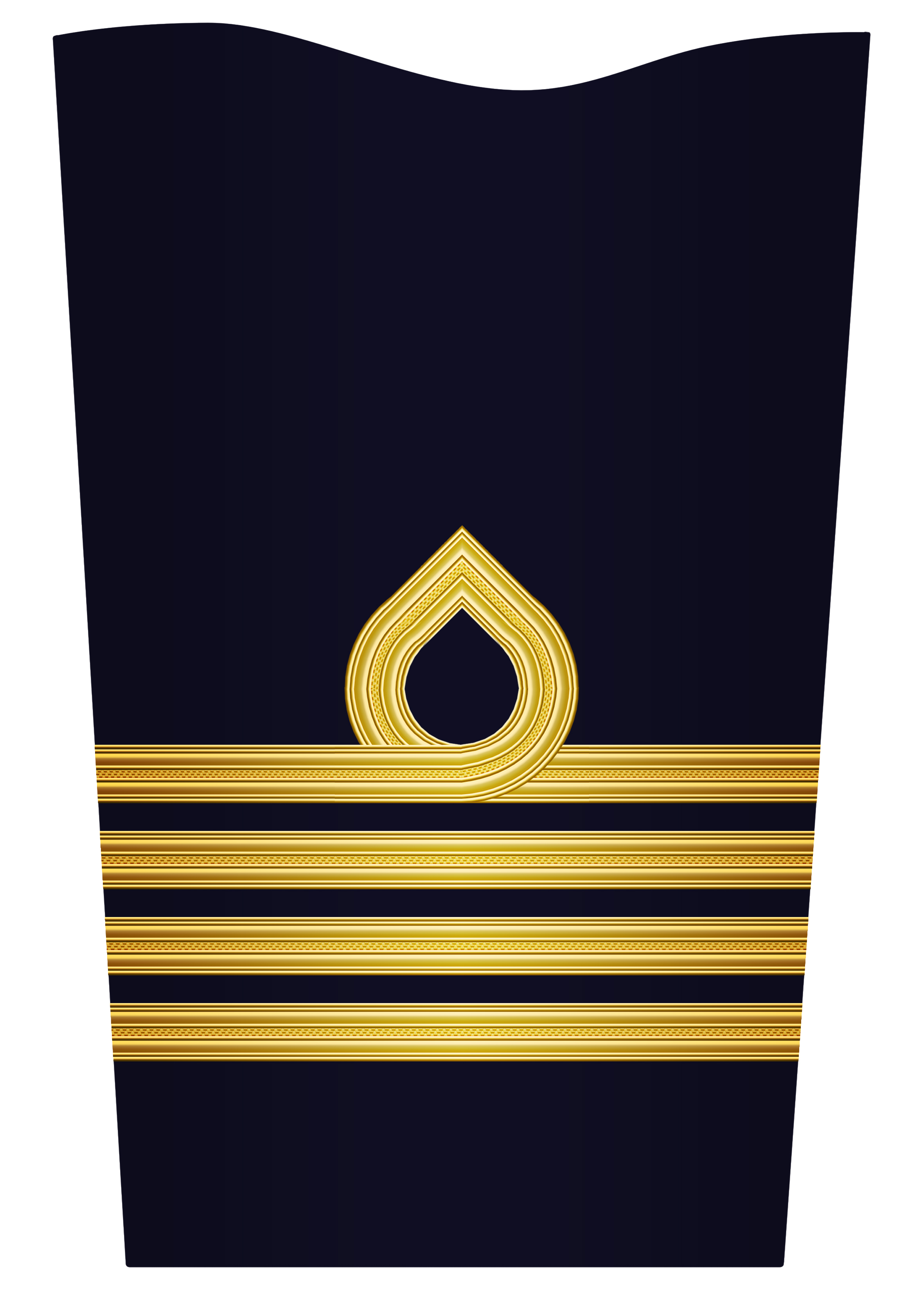
Sleeve insignia on innerkavaj m/48 ("inner jacket m/48") for a colonel.
(2000–present)

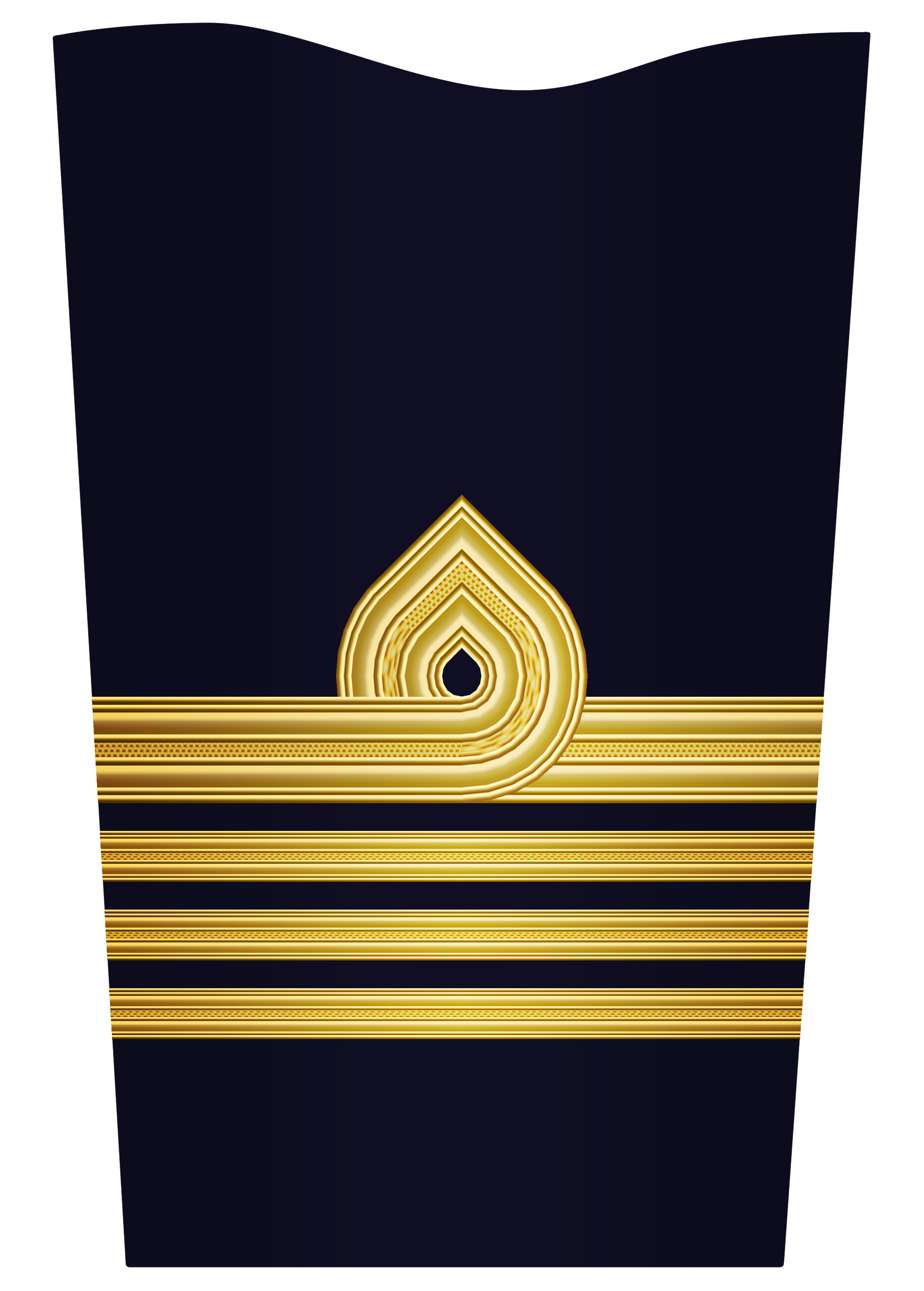
(1987–2000)

=== Hats ===
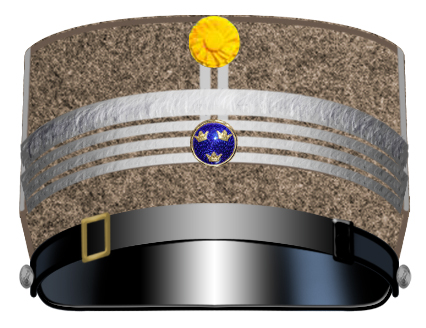
Hat (Mössa m/1923) for a colonel.

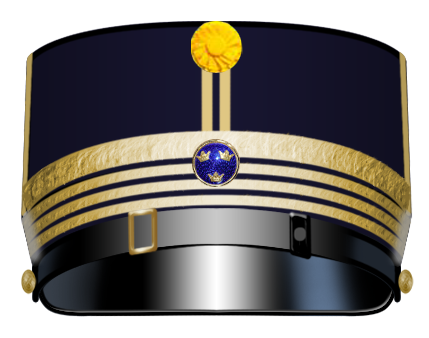
Camp hat (Lägermössa m/1865-99) for a colonel.

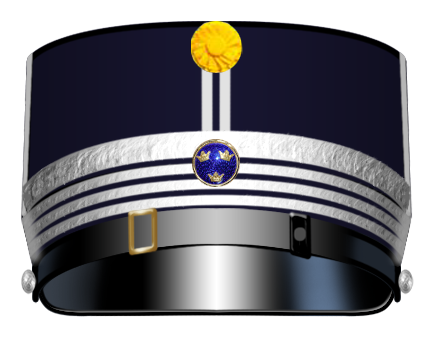
Hat (Mössa m/1865-99) for a colonel in Life Guards infantry.

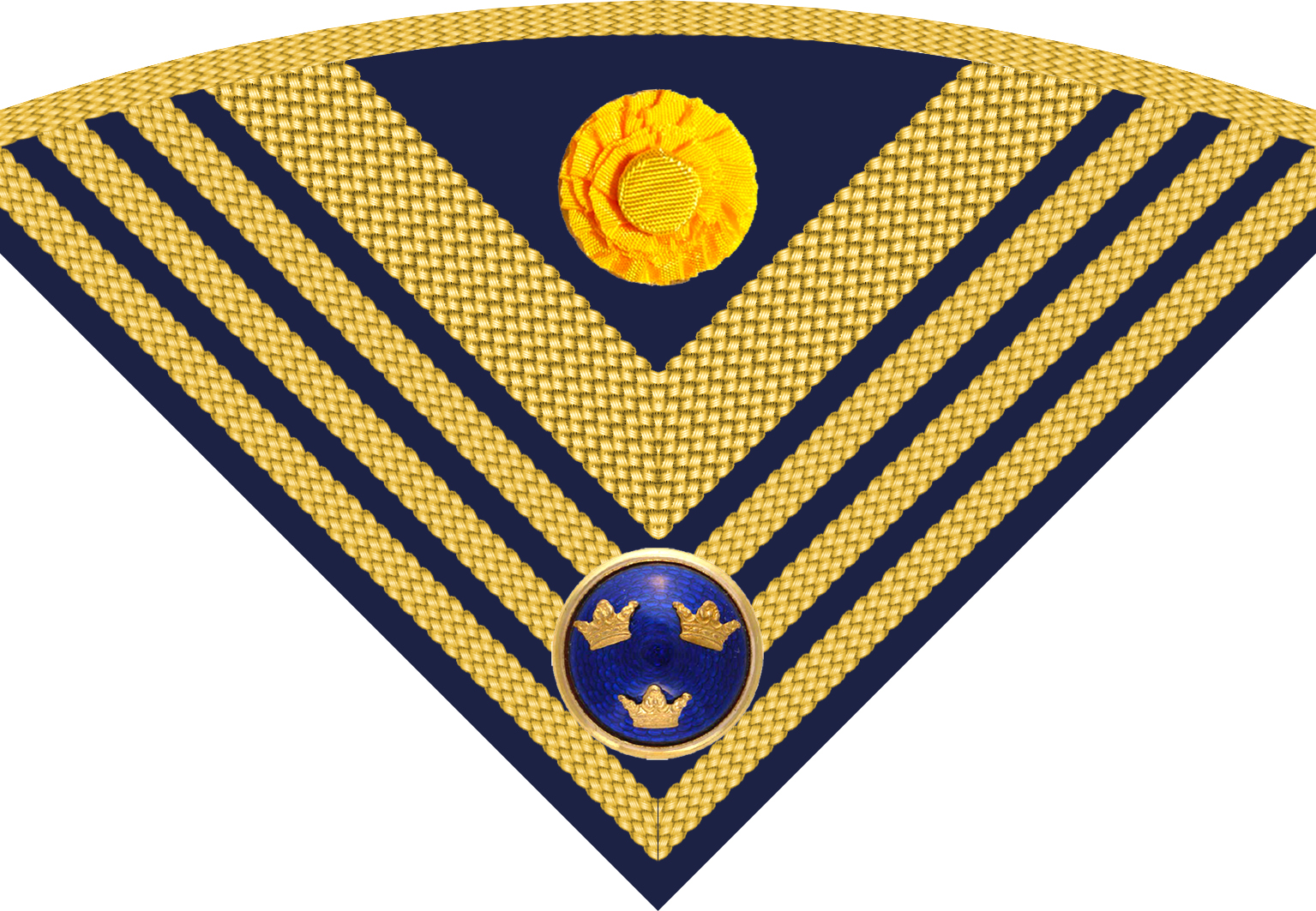
Rank insignia for a colonel on hat (Hatt m/1910-14) in the army.

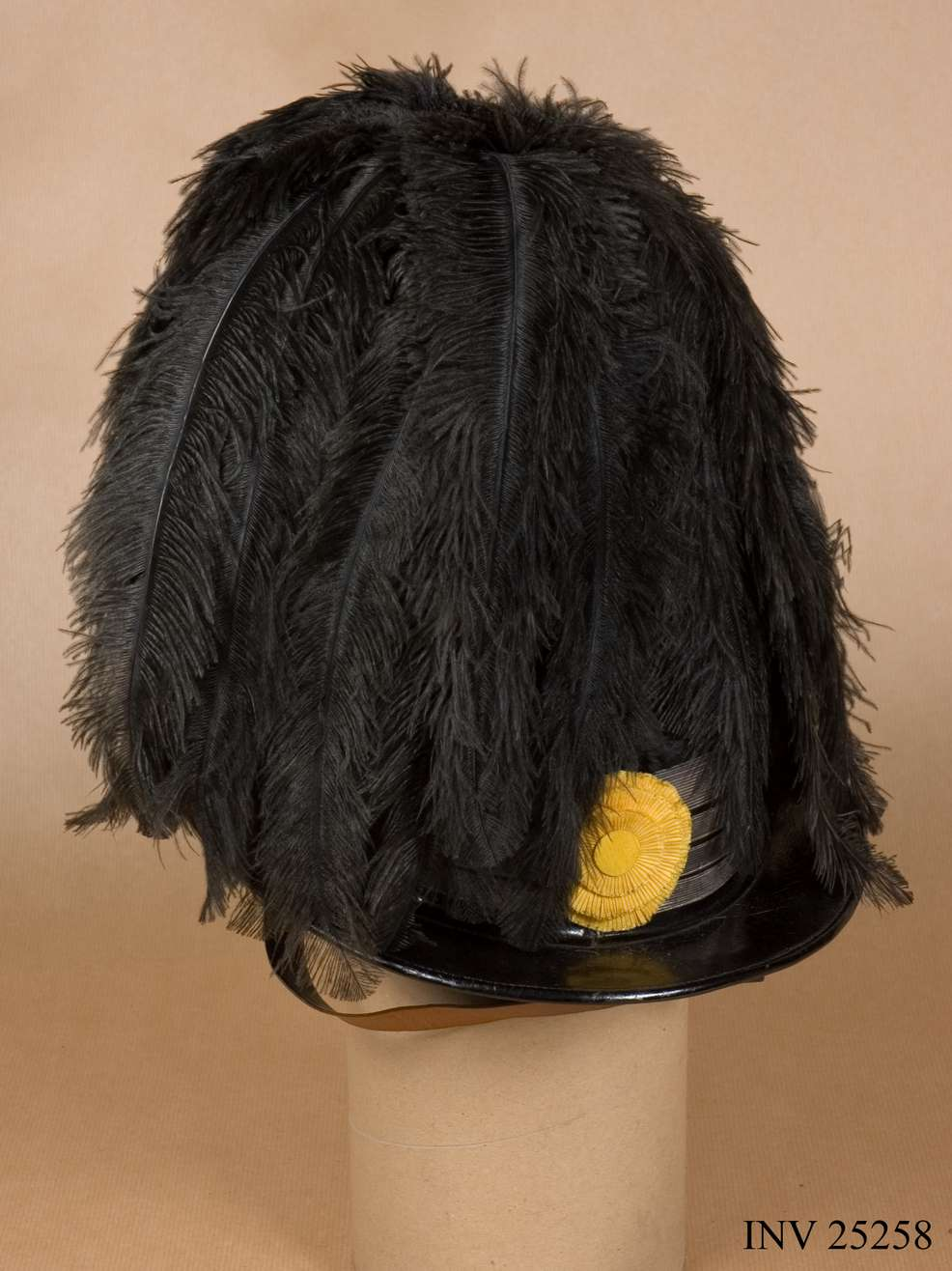
Hatt m/1859 for a colonel in Värmland Ranger Corps (Värmlands fältjägarkår)

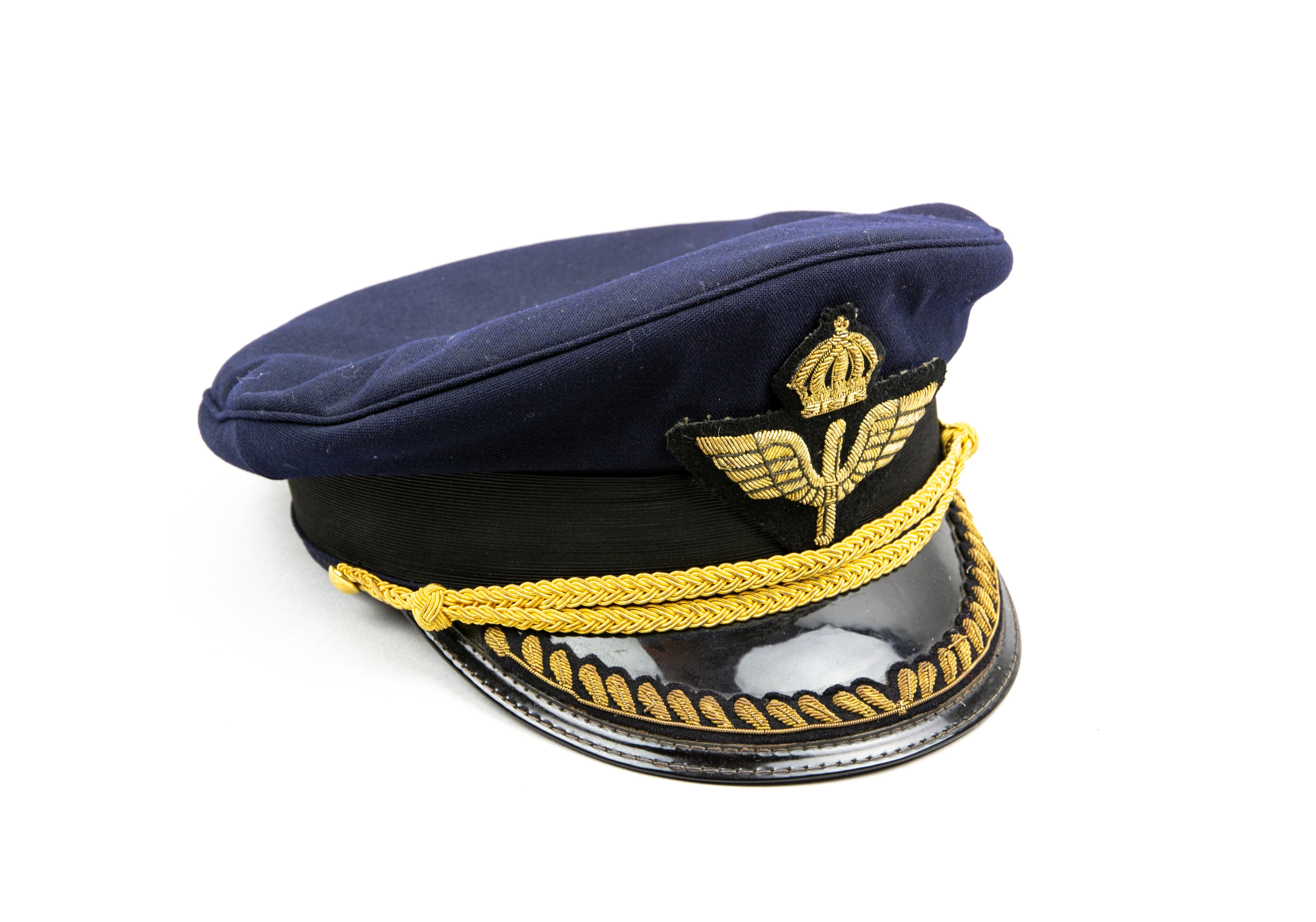
Peaked cap (dark blue) for air force colonel (Skärmmössa m/1930)
(1930–)
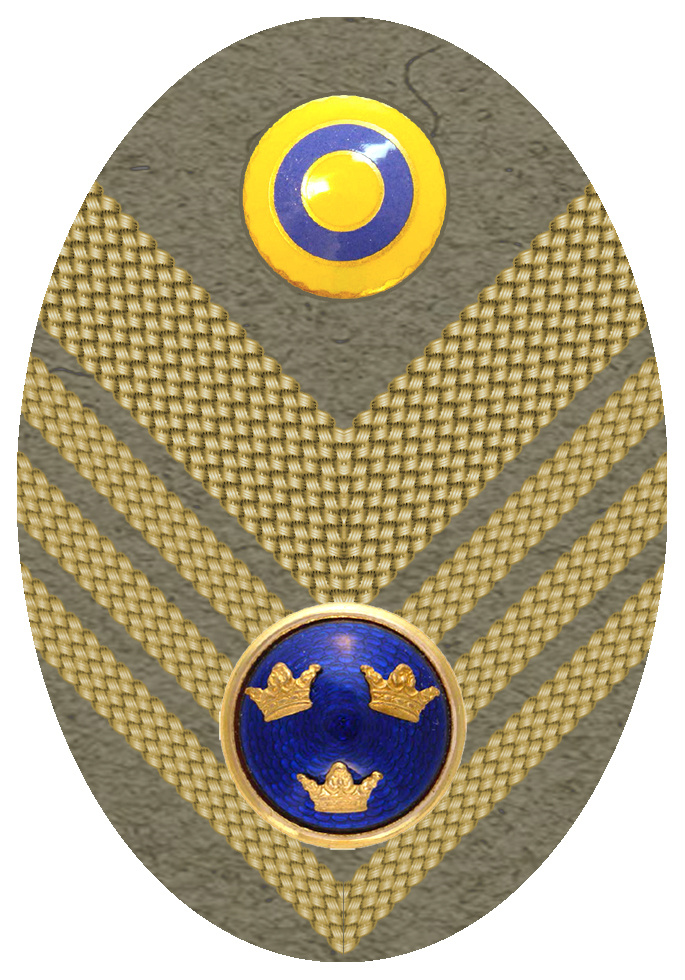
Hat badge (Mössmärke m/1946) for a colonel in the army.

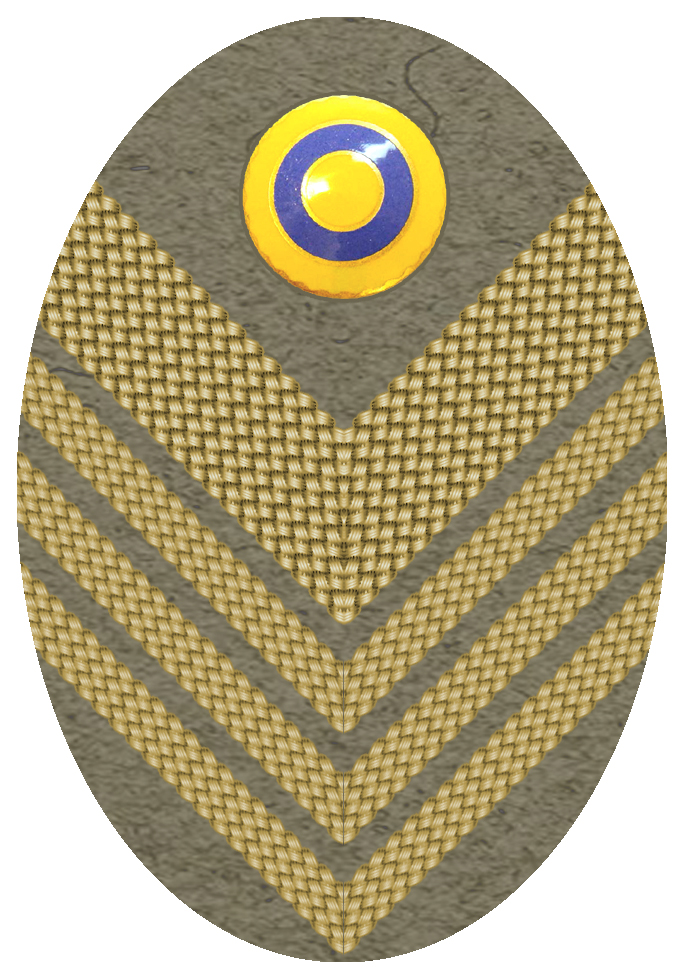
Hat badge (Mössmärke m/1940) for a colonel in the army.

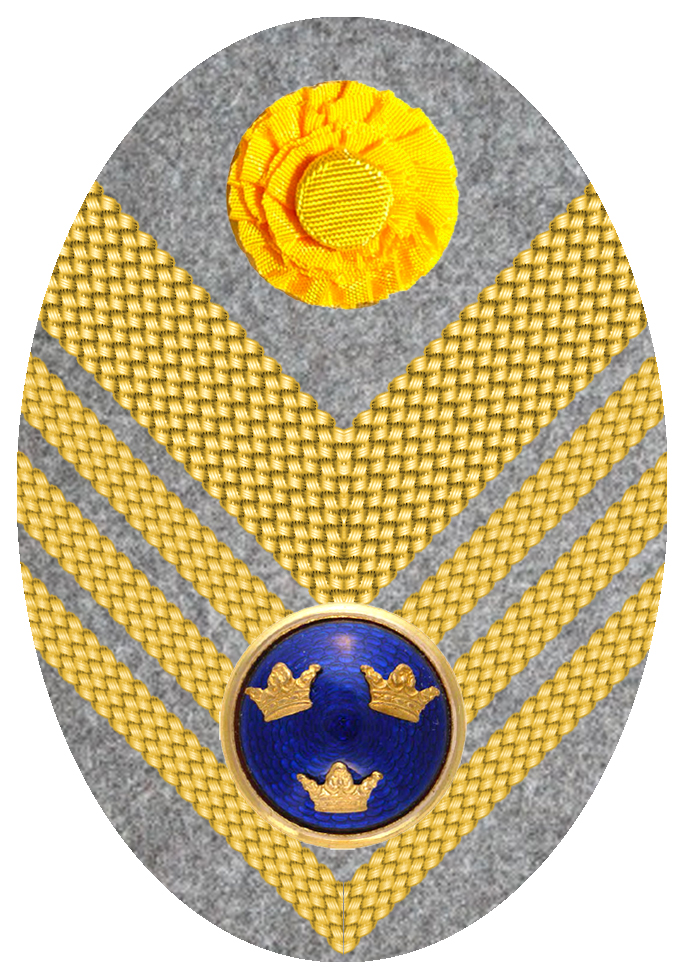
Hat badge (Mössmärke m/1914) for a colonel in the army on fur hat (pälsmössa m/1909-14).
