= Surgeon-in-Chief of the Swedish Air Force =

The Surgeon-in-Chief of the Swedish Air Force (Swedish: flygöverläkaren) was from 1943 to 1969 the senior-most medical service officer in the Swedish Air Force, responsible for flight surgeons and the overall aviation medicine. The Surgeon-in-Chief was posted to the Air Staff and reported to the Chief of the Air Force.

== History ==
The decision to establish a position of Surgeon-in-Chief of the Swedish Air Force was made through the Defence Act of 1942. The Surgeon-in-Chief was posted to the Air Staff. In the 1945 organization, the Surgeon-in-Chief assisted the Chief of the Air Force in inspecting the activities of the Air Force and was the service branch inspector for the Air Force's health care system and in this capacity was directly under the command of the Chief of the Air Force. The Surgeon-in-Chief answered under the Chief of the Air Force for the professional medical training of the surgeons. There was no special medical corps in the air force. The flight surgeons in active service consisted of appointed flight surgeons in the air force and appointed remunerated flight surgeons in the air force. Furthermore, there were flight surgeons in the air force reserve. The Surgeon-in-Chief of the Swedish Air Force was assisted in his work by an assistant (1st flight surgeon), an examination doctor (1st flight surgeon), who was the head of the Air Force's medical examination center, and two specialist flight surgeons, who handled special aviation medical matters.

To be able to be authorized for the position of Surgeon-in-Chief of the Swedish Air Force, one first had to achieve the rank of flygläkare av 1:a graden ("1st flight surgeon"). To gain employment as 1st flight surgeon, the following was required:

- a) to be a licensed physician;
- b) to fulfill the requirements stipulated for eligibility for the position of district medical officer in respect of completed service as a subordinate physician at a health care institution;
- c) to have, as capable of military service in weapons handling, fulfilled service prescribed for conscripts and equals in peacetime;
- d) to have, in his capacity as a battalion surgeon in the Swedish Army Medical Corps or in its reserve, satisfactorily completed at least sixty days' service as a surgeon in an army troop unit or also to have in his capacity as a naval surgeon candidate or naval surgeon of the 2nd rank in the Swedish Naval Medical Officers' Corps or in the Swedish Navy reserve completed at least sixty days' service on a naval ship, at a naval station or in the Swedish Coastal Artillery;
- e) that, in the case of the first employment as a surgeon with the Air Force, at the end of the application period he has not reached the age of 40; and
- f) to fulfill, with regard to the condition of the body, the requirements prescribed for those who apply for permanent employment with the Swedish Armed Forces.

The duties of the Surgeons-in-Chief of the different service branches were — with some exceptions — of a dual nature and included both a position as a service branch inspector and command of the appropriate administrative corps. The exception was that the Surgeons-in-Chief of the Swedish Air Force did not exercise command over an administrative corps, since the air force's surgeons did not form a special administrative corps organizationally. As a branch inspector, each of the three Surgeons-in-Chief were responsible for the condition of the relevant branch in various respects, such as the hygienic conditions, healthcare in general and the professional activities. Although the Surgeons-in-Chief of the Swedish Air Force did not head an administrative corps, he was largely responsible for the duties of the air force surgeons.

In 1969, the Surgeon-in-Chief had seven officials under him. The same year the position was withdrawn.

== Training ==
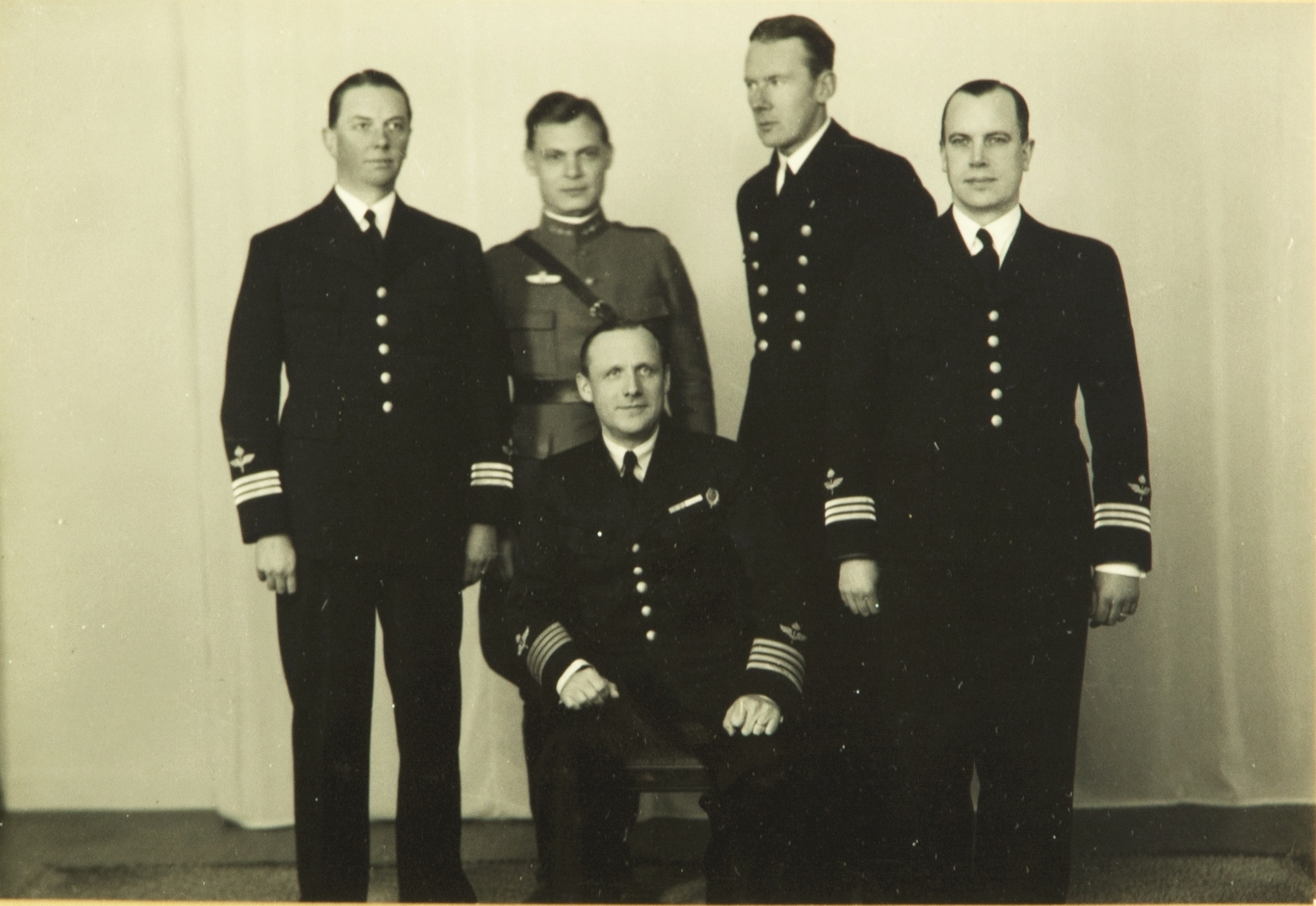
A course for flight surgeons in 1937.

The medical basis formally consists of a Licentiate of Medical Science (Medicine licentiatexamen) degree and an additional eight months of hospital training, which corresponded to the training required for district medical officer qualifications. There was no significant further medical education. The military base consisted of the training provided within the framework of conscription. As a supplement to this, the military surgeons in active service had to undergo a military medical course (respectively aviation medical course) in six to eight weeks. In addition, some training has been announced in connection with unit-specific application exercises as well as field service, field, staff and war unit exercises.

As far as aviation medicine training is concerned, a flight surgeon course was arranged on average every two or three years and included four weeks of training. In these courses, the main emphasis was on aviation medicine, staff and maintenance services as well as base support problems, especially in warfare with ABC weapons. In addition, there were refresher courses (staff courses) for wing surgeons, flight courses for flight surgeons and basic courses. The wing surgeons' refresher courses (staff courses) were arranged annually for two to three days. During this training, new medical and weapons technical aspects were announced as a background for it ongoing planning work within the Air Force's medical organization. The flight course for flight surgeons was divided into two years with the first period of four weeks at the Swedish Air Force Flying School in Ljungbyhed and the second period of likewise four weeks on a wing. The course was voluntary and mainly led to flying in double command on suitable aircraft. The course was organized annually. Basic course was arranged every year or every other year and included one week. This dealt with maintenance and medical tactics and medical technical problems at an air base.

== Surgeons-in-Chief ==
No.	Portrait	Name	Took office	Left office	Time in office	Chief of the Air Force	Ref.
1	Einar Westerberg, Hon M.D.	Einar Westerberg, Hon M.D. (1893–1976)	1940	1952	11–12 years	Torsten Friis; Bengt Nordenskiöld	
2	Gustaf Severin, L.Med.	Gustaf Severin, L.Med. (1906–1973)	1952	1963	10–11 years	Bengt Nordenskiöld; Axel Ljungdahl; Torsten Rapp; Lage Thunberg	
3	Uno Lundberg, M.D.	Uno Lundberg, M.D. (1907–1997)	1963	1969	5–6 years	Lage Thunberg; Stig Norén	

== See also ==
- Surgeon-in-Chief of the Swedish Army
- Surgeon-in-Chief of the Swedish Navy
- Surgeon-General of the Swedish Armed Forces
