= Hugo Sundstedt =

Swedish-American aviation pioneer

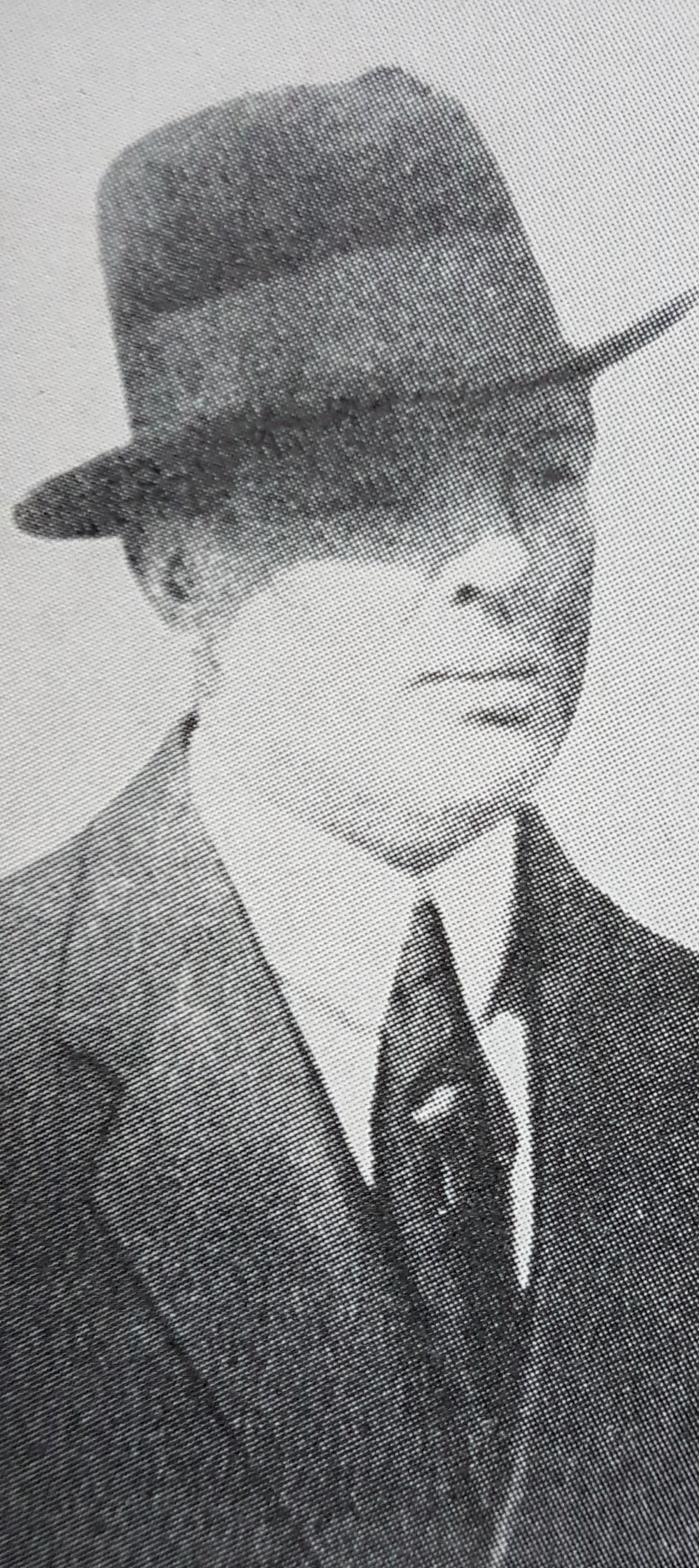
- Born: July 12, 1886; Örebro, Sweden
- Died: July 8, 1966 (aged 79); Liberty, New York
- Occupation: Aviator

Hugo Sundstedt (12 July 1886 - 8 July 1966) was a Swedish-American aviation pioneer.

== Biography ==
Hugo Sundstedt was born Hugo Leonardsson on 12 July 1886 in Örebro, the fourth child to an unmarried woman. The family lived in cramped conditions, and in 1892, he was auctioned off to a shoe dealer for 75 Swedish krona (SEK). In 1897, he was adopted by the businessman Olof Sundstedt. Now he had the opportunity to study, but since the study results were not good, he applied to the Swedish Navy in 1901 as a cadet. After leaving the fleet in 1904, he got a job in an office in Örebro. Because he did not like being behind a desk, he applied for the merchant navy in October 1905, but he disembarked in Cardiff on 19 February 1906. He returned to Sweden, and in 1908 he got a job as a taxi driver in Stockholm, an occupation he held until 1911.

In Stockholm, he got to know the car dealer Carl Cederström, who graduated as an aviator in France in 1910; this aroused Sundstedt's interest. He started helping Cederström with the aircraft for free, with the idea of gaining his own experience of flying, in order to finally obtain a flight certificate himself. He first flew on 1 June 1912 at Ljungbyhed with Cederström's aircraft, a Blériot XI named Nordstjernan (The North Star). With some wealthy businessmen from Örebro as sponsors, he managed to buy Nordstjernan from Cederström. During one of his longer flights, on 21 June 1912, he broke the Scandinavian altitude record, when he reached an altitude of 1,800 metres during a two-and-a-half-hour flight over Malmen.

He also became a pioneer in freight flying, as he transported bundles of newspapers by air. The intention was that he would undergo the certificate tests in July 1912, but an accident occurred when a young woman was fatally hit by his aircraft propeller, and that led to an investigation, so the tests were cancelled. After the investigation showed that he was innocent, the tests were carried out at the beginning of August 1912. He was thus the first Swede to receive his entire flight education in Sweden, and to a large extent completely on his own without an instructor. He was awarded Swedish aviator diploma number 9 from the Swedish Aeronautical Society (SAS) on 2 August 1912.

Sundstedt was very active as a pilot in 1912 and 1913, and he participated in several air shows, and made flights around the country. On 10 August 1913, he completed the first flight between Malmö and Stockholm in 14 hours and 35 minutes. In the autumn of 1913, he sold the Nordstjernan aircraft to Enoch Thulin.

During the winter of 1913/1914, he travelled to France to buy a Farman aircraft, but during the flight test in April 1914 he crashed the aircraft, with the result that he had to stay in hospital for a few weeks, before he could return to Sweden with his new aircraft. He started the journey home in July 1914 from Buc in France, and crash landed on a grass field in Malmö. The aircraft was taken to Södertelge Verkstäder, where it was to be repaired.

When World War I broke out on 1 August 1914, Sundstedt offered the aircraft to the Swedish Navy. Both the aircraft and Sundstedt entered military service. He was appointed lieutenant and was posted to an air reconnaissance unit in Karlskrona. He was active as a marine pilot until 1916, when he resigned as captain. In the autumn of 1916, he left Sweden to work as a pilot in France, but since he failed to get a job offer, he continued his journey to the United States with the French steamship L'Espagnole. He landed in the port of New York on New Year's Day 1917. In the United States, he worked with the construction of seaplanes, floats, transport aircraft and wing construction.

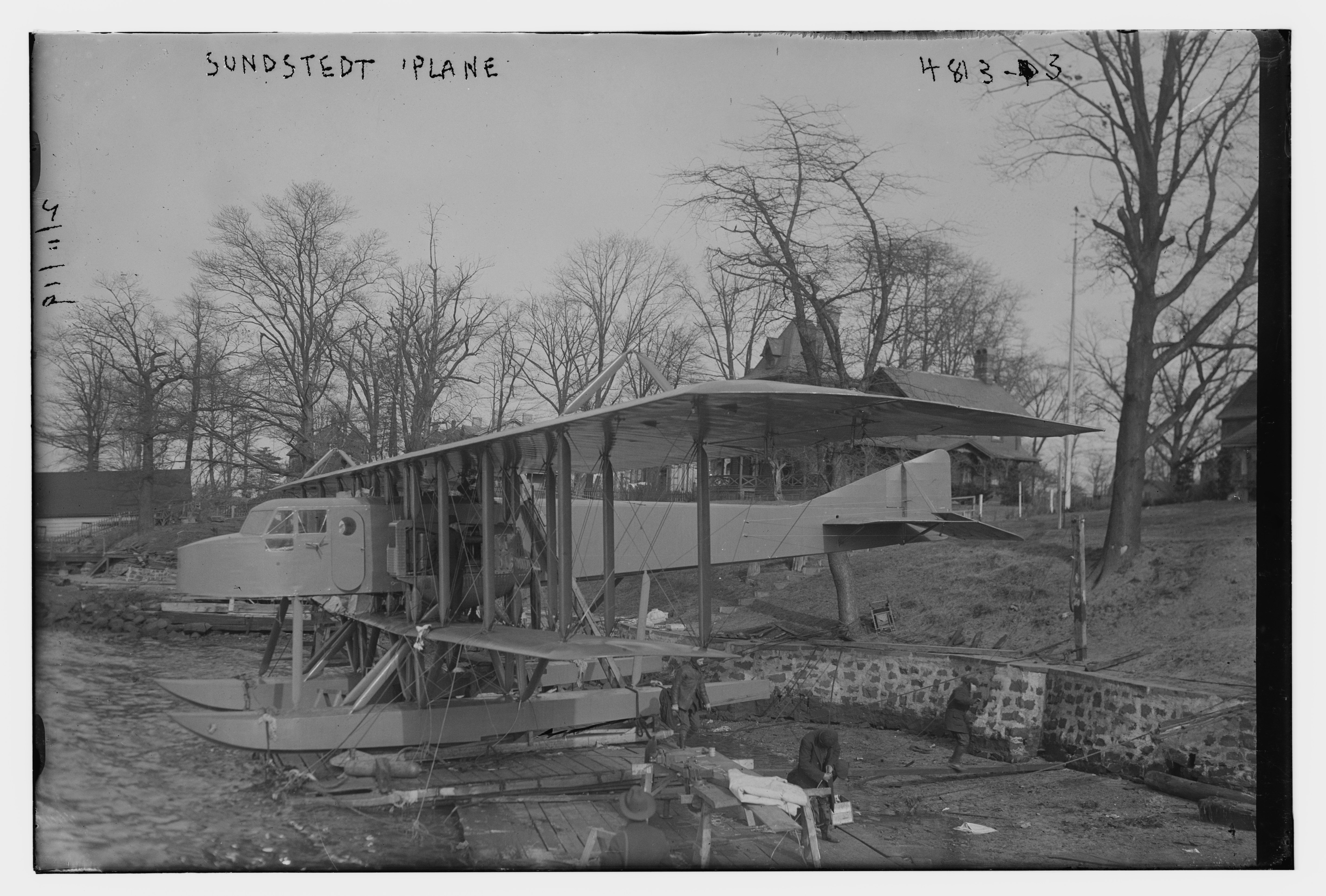
Sundstedt-Hannevig Seaplane

In 1919, after studying meteorology and the winds between America and Europe for a few years, he decided to design the Sundstedt-Hannevig Seaplane (aka Sunrise). With that aircraft, the idea was that he and the pilot Paul Micelli would carry out a Transatlantic flight, with financial support from the banker Christopher Hannevig. While the aircraft was being moved from its construction site, it suffered damage, and the intended departure had to be postponed due to repairs. Lack of funds then put a stop to further attempts for Sundstedt to cross the Atlantic by aircraft.

During the 1920s, Sundstedt worked for a number of different aircraft manufacturers, mainly with float-equipped aircraft. In 1924, he formed the Speed Boat Company. He formed his own consulting company Sundstedt Aircraft Corporation in 1934. The company designed a number of seaplanes for other aircraft manufacturers. He died on 8 July 1966 in Liberty, New York. His surviving writings and letters from 1919 to 1951 are preserved at the Wichita State University Special Archives.
