= Erik Nygren =

Swedish Air Force officer

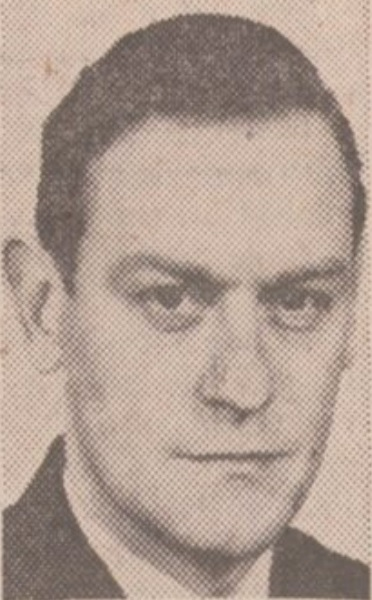
- Nygren c. in the mid-1960s.
- Born: Erik Gustav Vilhelm Nygren; 18 July 1923; Visby, Sweden
- Died: 27 September 1999 (aged 76); Stockholm, Sweden
- Military career
- Allegiance: Sweden
- Branch: Swedish Air Force
- Service years: 1946–1983
- Rank: Major General
- Commands: Jämtland Wing; Chief of Staff, Milo ÖN; Chief of the Air Staff; Attack Command

Major General Erik Gustav Vilhelm Nygren (18 July 1923 – 27 September 1999) was a Swedish Air Force officer. Nygren's senior command was Chief of the Air Staff from 1978 to 1980 and Commanding General of the Attack Command from 1980 to 1983.

== Early life ==
Nygren was born on 18 July 1923 in Visby City Parish (Visby stadsförsamling), Sweden, the son of Artur Nygren, a senior postman, and his wife Ester (née Berg).

== Career ==
Nygren was commissioned as an officer in the Swedish Air Force in 1946 with the rank of second lieutenant. He was promoted to lieutenant in Östgöta Wing (F 3) in 1948 where he served as squadron commander from 1949 to 1954. Nygren attended the General Course at the Royal Swedish Air Force Staff College in 1951 and was promoted to captain in the 2nd Air Command in 1953.

Nygren attended the Staff Course at the Royal Swedish Air Force Staff College from 1954 and 1955 and served as a staff officer from 1956 to 1957. In 1958, Nygren was promoted to major, whereupon he was flight commander at Hälsinge Wing (F 15) from 1958 to 1961 and led training for Austrian pilots in Sweden and served in the Austrian Air Force in 1961. He served as section chief in the 2nd Air Command from 1962 to 1966, and was promoted to Lieutenant Colonel in 1963 and attended the General Course at the Swedish National Defence College in 1964.

In 1966, Nygren was promoted to colonel, whereupon he was commanding officer of the Jämtland Wing from 1966 to 1968. He was promoted to senior colonel in 1969, and then served as air inspector in the staff of the Southern Military District (Milo S) from 1969 to 1974. Nygren then served as system inspector in the Air Staff from 1975 to 1977. In 1977, Nygren was promoted to major general, after which he was Chief of Staff of Upper Norrland Military District (Milo ÖN) from 1977 to 1978. On 1 October 1978, Nygren was appointed Chief of the Air Staff and served until 30 September 1980. On 1 October 1980, Nygren assumed the position of commanding officer of the Attack Command. He left the position three years later on 30 September 1983 and retired from active service.

== Personal life ==
In 1948, Nygren married Elsie Löfveberg (1925–1989), the daughter of Gösta Löfveberg and Ester (née Högstadius).

== Death ==
Nygren died on 27 September 1999 in Saint Göran Parish in Stockholm. He was interred at the Eastern Cemetery in Visby.

== Dates of rank ==
- 1946 – Second lieutenant
- 1948 – Lieutenant
- 1953 – Captain
- 1958 – Major
- 1963 – Lieutenant colonel
- 1966 – Colonel
- 1969 – Senior colonel
- 1977 – Major general

== Awards and decorations ==
- (Sweden) Commander 1st Class of the Order of the Sword (6 June 1972)
- (Sweden) Commander of the Order of the Sword (6 June 1969)
- (Sweden) Knight 1st Class of the Order of the Sword (1964)

Military offices
Preceded by Bengt Schuback	Chief of Staff of the Upper Norrland Military District; 1977–1978	Succeeded by Evert Båge
Preceded by Hans Neij	Chief of the Air Staff; 1978–1980	Succeeded by Evert Båge
Preceded by Sven-Olof Olson	Attack Command; 1980–1983	Succeeded by Bertil Nordström
