= Paulus af Uhr =

Swedish high jumper and air force officer

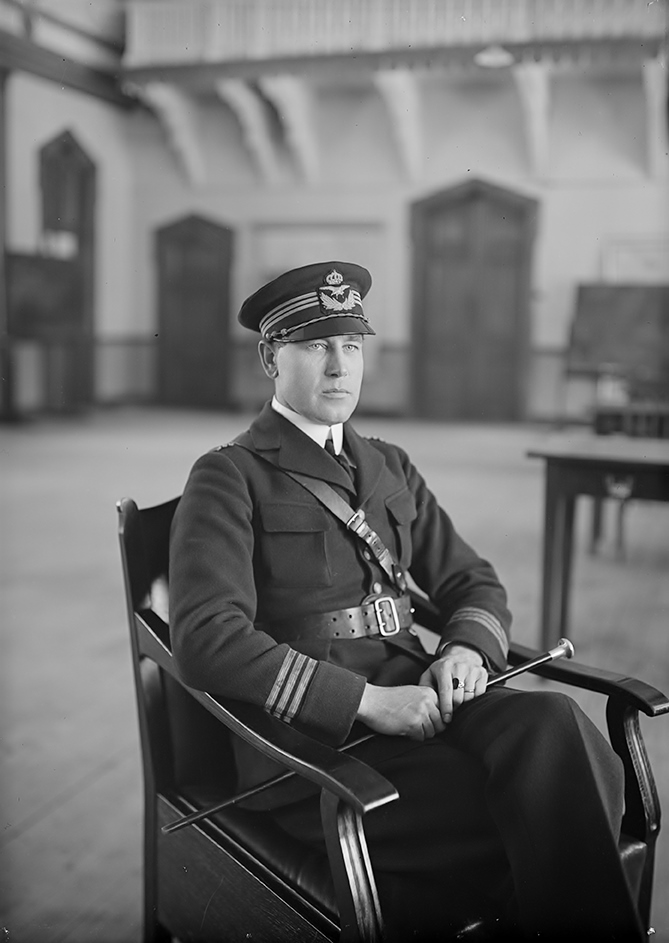
- Born: Paulus Reinhold af Uhr; 25 January 1892; Bondkyrka, Sweden
- Died: 28 April 1972 (aged 80); Uppsala, Sweden
- Military career
- Allegiance: Sweden
- Branch: Swedish Air Force
- Service years: 1913–1952
- Rank: Major General
- Nickname: Paul
- Commands: Military Office of the Air Force; 1st Air Command

Major General Paulus Reinhold af Uhr (25 January 1892 – 28 April 1972) was a Swedish Air Force officer. He also competed at the 1912 Summer Olympics.

== Early life ==
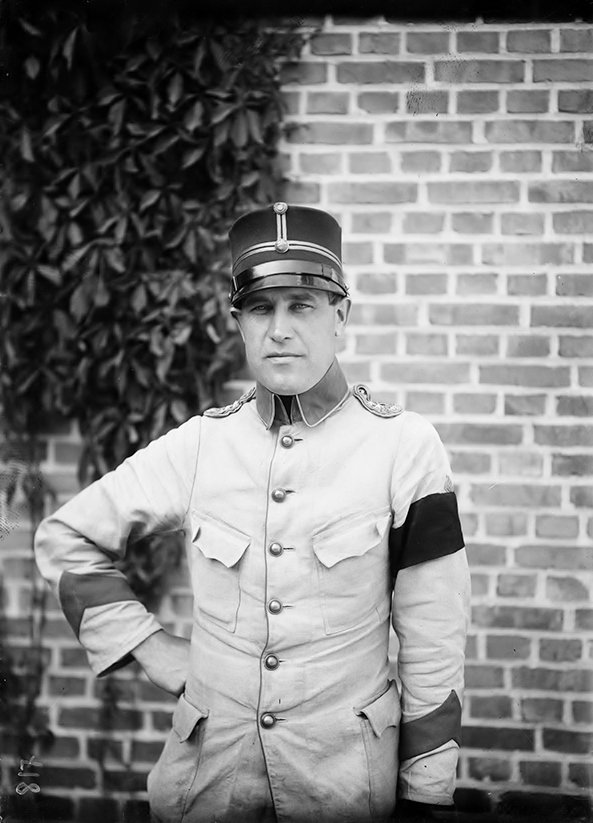
Lieutenant af Uhr.

af Uhr was born on 25 January 1892 in Bondkyrka, Uppsala County, Sweden, the son of builder Otto af Uhr and Anna (née Ferm). He passed studentexamen in Uppsala on 31 May 1911 and became a volunteer in the Life Regiment Grenadiers (I 3) on 2 June 1911. af Uhr was transferred to the Jämtland Ranger Regiment (I 23) on 1 June 1912. About a month later, af Uhr finished 23rd in the high jump competition during the 1912 Summer Olympics.

== Career ==
He became an officer on 18 December 1913 and was commissioned as a underlöjtnant in the Jämtland Ranger Regiment on 31 December the same year. af Uhr participated in the Baltic Games during the Baltic Exhibition in Malmö in 1914. af Uhr was promoted to lieutenant in the Jämtland Ranger Regiment on 11 February 1916 and then served in the aviation services of the Field Telegraph Corps from 1918 to 1919. He then became captain in the newly established Swedish Air Force on 29 June 1926 and in the Jämtland Ranger Regiment on 30 December the same year. af Uhr was educated at the Royal Swedish Army Staff College from 1931 to 1933 and was promoted to major in the Swedish Air Force on 25 July 1934.

af Uhr was appointed head of the Education Department at the Air Staff in 1934 and was then head of the Operation Department at the Air Staff from 1936 to 1937. He was promoted to lieutenant colonel on 30 April 1937 and was appointed chief of the Military Office of the Air Force (Flygvapnets kommandoexpedition) the same year. af Uhr was promoted to colonel on 22 June 1939 (effective from 1 July) and was appointed commanding officer of the 1st Air Command (E 1) on 1 July 1942. He was promoted to major general on 1 April 1946 and left the position at the 1st Air Command in 1952 when he became Vice CEO of Östermans Aero AB. af Uhr left Östermans in 1957.

== Other work ==
He was chairman of executive committee of the Royal Swedish Aero Club in 1939 and vice chairman of Royal Swedish Aero Club in 1954. He became a member of the Royal Swedish Academy of War Sciences in 1944.

== Personal life ==
On 21 August 1919 at Vårdnäs Church in Östergötland County he married Anna Elisabet Gustava (Elsa) Linderstam (born 8 November 1894 in Norrköping), the daughter of the wholesaler Erik Gunnar Linderstam and his wife Anna Maria Elisabet Jansson. They had three children; Jan Olof Reinhold (born 6 December 1920 in Linköping), Anna Ragnhild Gunilla (born 15 July 1924 in Malmslätt) and Elsa Katharina Margareta Ulrika (born 28 December 1927 in Malmslätt).

== Awards and decorations ==
af Uhr's awards:

=== Swedish ===
- (Sweden) Commander 1st Class of the Order of the Sword (6 June 1945)
- (Sweden) Commander 1st Class of the Order of Vasa (5 June 1943)
- (Sweden) Royal Swedish Aero Club's Gold Medal
- (Sweden) Östergötland Rifle Association's Silver Medal (Östergötlands skytteförbunds silvermedalj)
- (Sweden) NAKFSM

=== Foreign ===
- Grand Officer of the Order of the Crown of Italy
- Commander of the Order of the White Rose of Finland
- (Nazi Germany) 1st Class of the Order of the German Eagle
- (Finland) 2nd Class of the Order of the Cross of Liberty with Swords
- (Finland) Finnish commemorative medal Pro benignitate humana
- (Lithuania) Officer of the Order of the Lithuanian Grand Duke Gediminas
- (Denmark) Knight of the Order of the Dannebrog
- (Finland) Finnish Air Force's aviation badge (Finska luftstridskrafternas flygmärke)
- (Italy) Italian Air Force's aviation badge (Italienska luftstridskrafternas flygmärke)
- (Poland) Polish Air Force's aviation badge (Polska luftstridskrafternas flygmärke)

Military offices
Preceded by Harald Enell	Military Office of the Air Force; 1937–1942	Succeeded by Gösta Adolfsson
Preceded by Bengt Nordenskiöld	1st Air Command; 1942–1952	Succeeded by Björn Bjuggren
