= Baron Cederstrom =

Baron Cederstrom may refer to:

- Bror Cederström (1780-1877)
- Carl Cederström (1867-1918)
