= Västgöta Wing =

Coordinates: 58°31′10″N 14°31′25″E

- Västgöta flygflottilj
- Active: 1939–1994
- Country: Sweden
- Allegiance: Swedish Armed Forces
- Branch: Swedish Air Force
- Type: Wing
- Role: Light bomb wing (1939–1946); Attack wing (1946–1994)
- Part of: 2nd Air Command (1942–1948); 1st Air Command (1948–1966); Milo V (1966–1993); Milo S (1993–1994)
- Garrison/HQ: Karlsborg
- Motto(s): Tro och vilja ("Faith and will")
- March: "Victoria-marsch" (Korsgren) (Note: The march was adopted and established on 4 April 1986.)

Insignia
- Roundel

Aircraft flown
- Attack: A 21A, A 29, A32 A, AJ 37
- Multirole helicopter: Hkp 2, Hkp 3, Hkp 9
- Reconnaissance: S 14
- Trainer: Sk 11, Sk 12, Sk 15, Sk 16, Sk 50
- Transport: Tp 5, Tp 83
- G 101, Se 102, Se 103, Se 104

Västgöta Wing (Swedish: Västgöta flygflottilj), also F 6 Karlsborg, or simply F 6, is a former Swedish Air Force wing with the main base located near Karlsborg in south-central Sweden.

== History ==
The airfield Lusharpan had been used by the army air corps of Karlsborg Fortress since 1915 to practice strafing and bombing at the artillery range. In 1936, the first steps was taken towards a permanent base by constructing hangars for two squadrons. In 1937 the grass field was extended to 1600 m x 1200 m and a maintenance shop was also put up.

The Air Wing was officially commissioned on July 1, 1939 but with only 19 staff and three officers with one Sk 9, one Sk 11 trainers and three other aircraft on loan from other wings.

With World War II breaking out on September 1, 1939, Jämtland Wing (F 4) regrouped their B 4 bombers to Karlsborg and transferred them to the F 6 wing at the same rate as the F 4 wing received their new B 5 bombers. The B 4 bombers were kept until 1941 when they were transferred to Skaraborg Wing (F 7) in favor of new B 5 bombers.

Between 1943 and 1947 the wing was equipped with B 17 dive bombers.

In 1947, the wing was redesigned as an attack wing and replaced the B 17s with A 21 aircraft, even though the tactical use of the new aircraft was the same as with the B 17s. Some of the A 21s were transferred from Skaraborg Wing. There were a total of 70 A 21s at F 6, but a staggering 30 planes were lost due to the poor condition of the grass field which was paved in 1950.

The Saab 29 Tunnan was briefly in service for four years from 1954 to 1957 until the Saab 32 Lansen was introduced and served for 20 years until 1977. The jet noise of the Saab 32 Lansen was so high that the base was forced to buy the property of complaining residents.

In 1977 the AJ 37 replaced the A 32 and was in service until the base was decommissioned on June 30, 1994.

The airfield was reopened in 2007 under the control of Life Regiment Hussars (K 3).

== Barracks and training areas ==
=== Barracks ===
Among other things, the wing took over the premises of the Infantry Volunteer School (Infanterivolontärskolan) in Karlsborg. The runway, which runs in a north-south direction, was built in 1936-39 and extended in 1956. New hangars were built in 1961 and 1979.

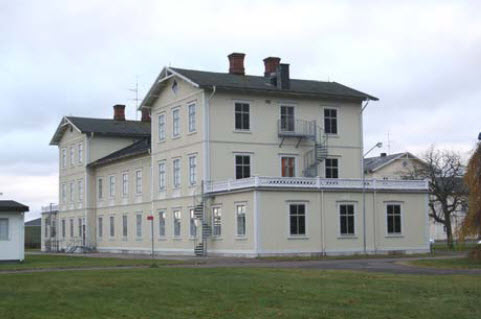
Chancellery building

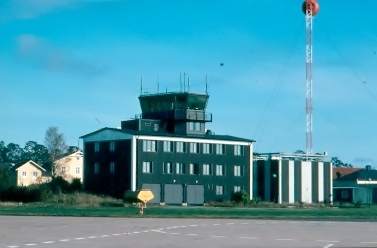
Control tower

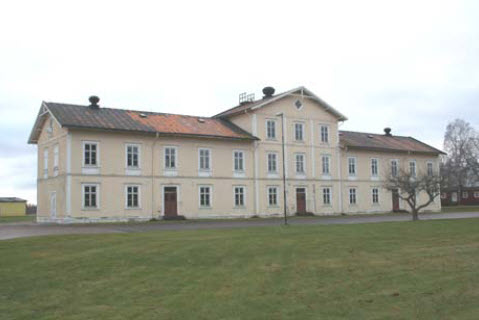
Western barracks

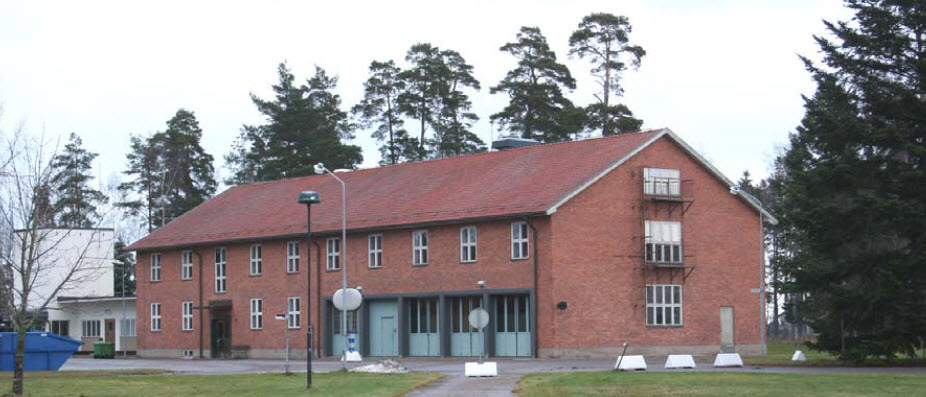
Fire station

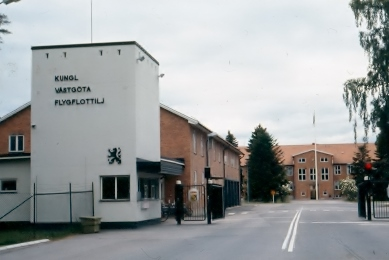
Guardhouse

=== Training areas ===
Rissnäset and Perstorp north of Karlsborg.

== Heraldry and traditions ==
=== Coat of arms ===
The coat of arms of the Västgöta Wing was used from 1939 to 1994. Blazon: "The provincial badge of Västergötland, per bend sinister sable and or, a lion rampant counterchanged, armed and langued gules between two estoiles argent in the first field".

Coat of arms used from 1939 to 1994.

=== Colours, standards and guidons ===
The colour was presented to the wing on 5 December 1940 by His Royal Highness Prince Gustaf Adolf, Duke of Västerbotten. Blazon: "On blue cloth in the centre the badge of the Air Force; a winged two-bladed propeller under a royal crown proper, all yellow. In the first corner the lion of the provincial badge of Västergötland; bended sinister in yellow and white, armed and langued red, between two white estoiles".

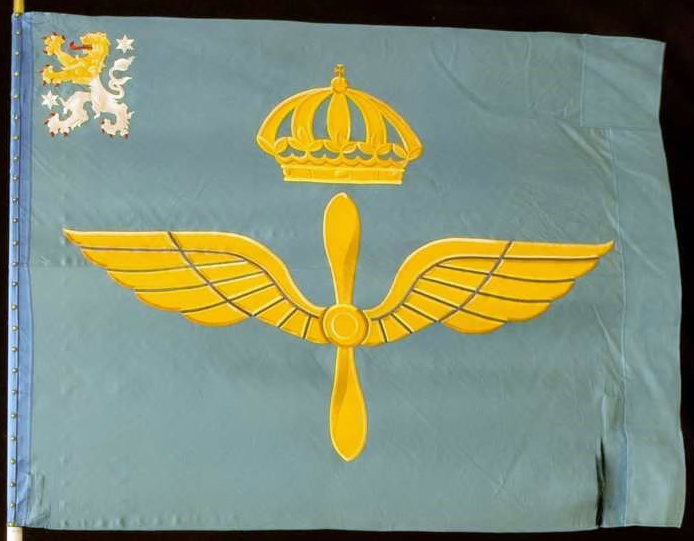
1940 colour

=== March ===
”Victoria-marsch” was composed in the 1890s by the civil engineer Gustaf (Gösta) Korsgren. It was adopted on 4 April 1986. The march is also adopted as march of the Voluntary Officer Training (Frivilliga Befälsutbildningen, FBU) in 1977.

== Commanding officers ==
Commanding officers from 1939 to 1994. The commanding officer was referred to as wing commander and had the rank of colonel.

- 1939–1941: John Stenbeck
- 1941–1950: Gösta Hård
- 1950–1960: Anders ("Ante") Söderlindh
- 1960–1971: Nils Hansson
- 1971–1977: Hans Sjövall
- 1977–1986: Gunnar Hovgard
- 1986–1989: Göran Tode
- 1989–1993: Sten Öhlander
- 1993–1994: Claes Bjärle (acting)

== Names, designations and locations ==
Name	Translation	From		To
Kungl. Västgöta flygflottilj	Royal Västgöta Wing	1939-07-01	–	1974-12-31
Västgöta flygflottilj	Västgöta Wing; Blekinge Air Group	1975-01-01	–	1994-06-30
Designation		From		To
F 6		1939-07-01	–	1994-06-30
Location		From		To
Karlsborg Airport		1939-07-01	–	1994-06-30

== See also ==
- Swedish Air Force
- List of military aircraft of Sweden
