= Björn Bjuggren =

Swedish Air Force officer and aviator

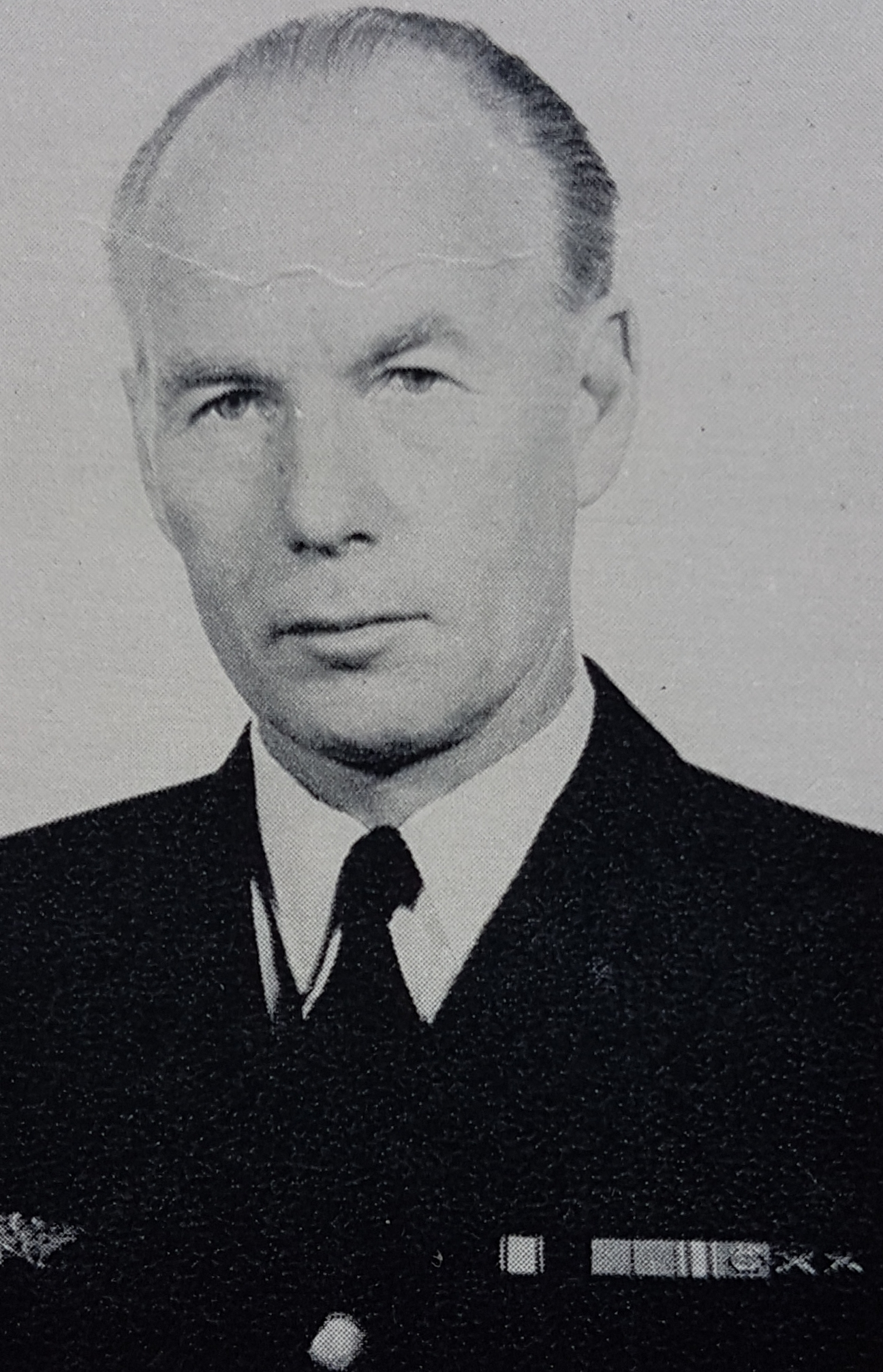
- Born: Björn Gustaf Eriksson Bjuggren; 29 January 1904; Karlsborg, Sweden
- Died: 4 April 1968 (aged 64); Stockholm, Sweden
- Burial place: Lidingö Cemetery
- Military career
- Allegiance: Sweden
- Branch: Swedish Air Force
- Service years: 1924–1964
- Rank: Lieutenant General
- Nickname: Bjuggas
- Commands: Jämtland Wing; Royal Swedish Air Force Staff College; 1st Air Command
- Conflicts: Winter War
- Other work: War Materials Inspector

Lieutenant General Björn "Bjuggas" Gustaf Eriksson Bjuggren (29 January 1904 – 4 April 1968) was a Swedish Air Force officer whose career combined operational command, aviation development, and international cooperation. Commissioned in 1924, he pursued extensive studies in aeronautics in Sweden and across Europe, gaining expertise in dive bombing and aircraft technology. Before and during World War II, he served as an instructor, military aviation expert, and test pilot, including work with the Finnish Air Force during the Winter War (1939–1940) and aircraft procurement missions in Germany, France, the Netherlands, and Italy.

He rose through the ranks to become commander of Jämtland Wing (1943–1947), later serving as head of the Air Force Staff College and Inspector of Flight Safety. In 1952, he was appointed Commanding General of the 1st Air Command, a post he held for over a decade, before becoming War Materials Inspector and head of the National Swedish War Materials Inspectorate (1965–1968). Widely respected for his contributions to aviation strategy and safety, Bjuggren played a central role in shaping Sweden's Air Force during a critical period of modernization and Cold War preparedness.

== Early life ==
Bjuggren was born on 29 January 1904 in Karlsborg, Sweden, the son of Colonel Erik Bjuggren (1874–1963) and his wife Ketty (née Ellsén). He passed studentexamen in Stockholm in 1922.

== Career ==
Bjuggren was commissioned as an officer in 1924. He attended the Artillery and Engineering College from 1926 to 1928 and various flight schools in 1928, 1930 and in 1933. Bjuggren participated in competitions in modern pentathlon in Germany in 1927 and in Finland in 1929. He studied aeronautics at the Royal Institute of Technology from 1931 to 1932 and studied in aircraft industries in Germany, France, Italy, England and in the Netherlands from 1932 to 1933. Bjuggren was an expert in the 1930 Defense Commission from 1933 to 1936 and studied at the Royal Swedish Army Staff College from 1934 to 1936. He also conducted trials and experimentation of dive bombing methods in 1934 and served during French bomb preparations in 1935. Bjuggren was promoted to captain in the Swedish Air Force in 1937 and was a teacher at the Royal Military Academy the same year. He was also an instructor in dive bombing in Finland and Denmark in 1937 and 1939. Bjuggren was also a teacher at the Royal Swedish Air Force Staff College in 1939.

During 1939-1940, he acted as chief of staff to the Flying Regiment 19, Finnish Air Force during the Winter War. In 1940-1941 he conducted test flights of dive bombers in Germany, France and the Netherlands and was headed the Swedish Air Force commission in Italy that carried out purchases of Caproni Ca.313 and Reggiane Re.2000. Bjuggren was promoted to major in 1941 and was head of the Operation Department at the Air Staff from 1941 to 1942. He was promoted to lieutenant colonel in 1943 and was commanding officer of Jämtland Wing (F 4) from 1943 to 1947. Bjuggren became a member of the Royal Swedish Academy of War Sciences in 1945 and was promoted to colonel the following year. He was then head of the Royal Swedish Air Force Staff College from 1947 to 1949 and was Inspector of Flight Security (Inspektör för flygsäkerhetstjänsten) from 1949 to 1952. Bjuggren was Commanding General of the 1st Air Command (E 1) from 1952 to 1964 and was then War Materials Inspector and head of the National Swedish War Materials Inspectorate from 1 January 1965 until his death on 4 April 1968.

== Personal life ==
From 1928–1932 he was married to Ingert Malmberg (1908–1967), the daughter of music writer Helge Malmberg and actress Anna Rosenbaum. In 1933 he married dance artist Jeanna Falk (1901–1980), the daughter of cantor Ferdinand Falk and Ida Rosenberger.

== Death ==
Bjuggren died on 4 April 1968 in Stockholm. He was interred on 29 April 1968 at Lidingö Cemetery.

== Dates of rank ==
- 19?? – Second lieutenant
- 19?? – Lieutenant
- 1937 – Captain
- 1941 – Major
- 1943 – Lieutenant colonel
- 1946 – Colonel
- 1954 – Major general
- 1964 – Lieutenant general

== Awards and decorations ==
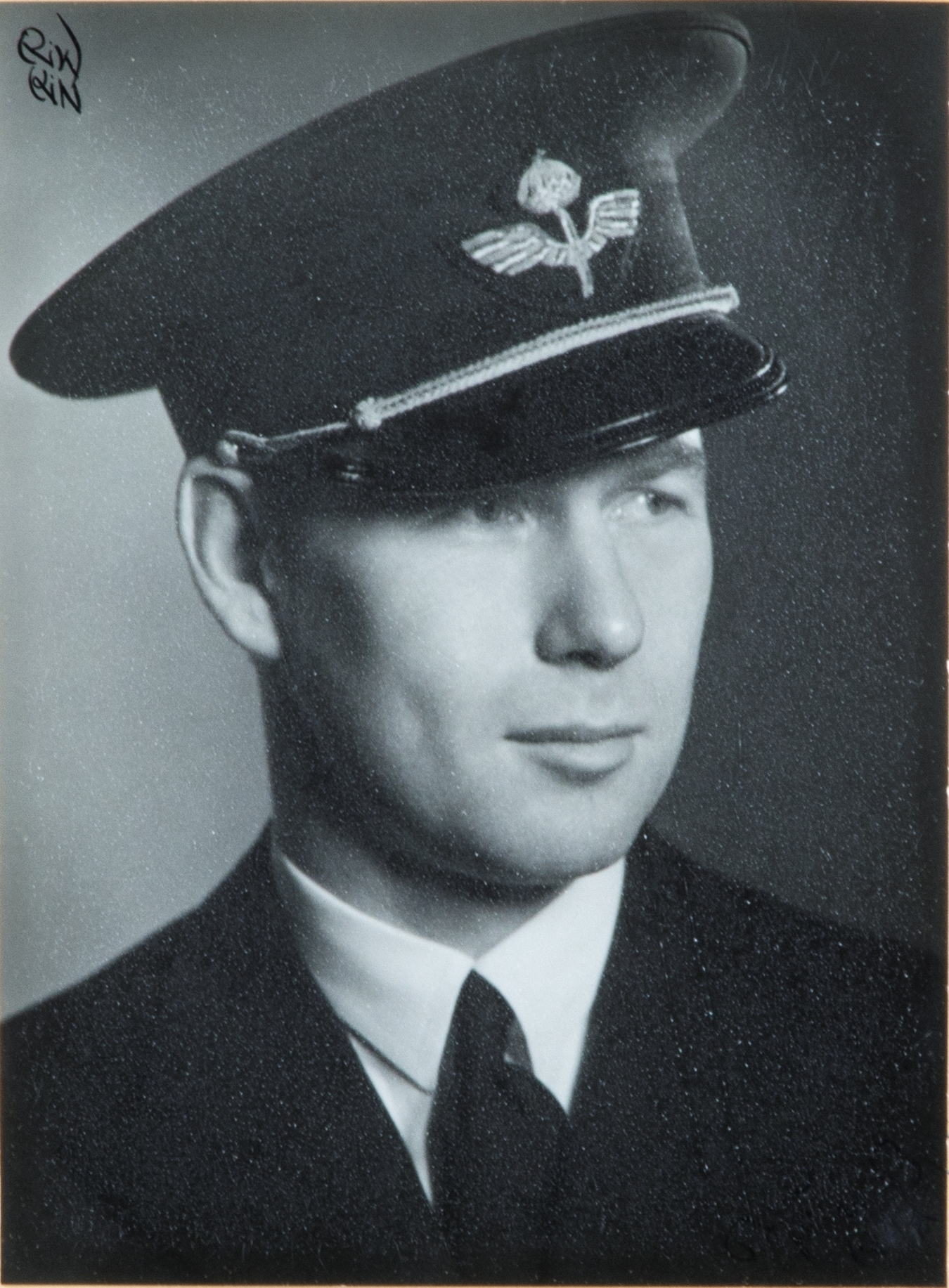
Major Bjuggren in the early 1940s.

=== Swedish ===
- (Sweden) Commander Grand Cross of the Order of the Sword (6 June 1964)
- (Sweden) Knight of the Order of the Polar Star
- (Sweden) Knight of the Order of Vasa
- (Sweden) Vasa Medal in gold

=== Foreign ===
- (Norway) Commander of the Order of St. Olav with Star
- Commander of the Order of the Crown of Italy
- Knight 1st Class of the Order of the White Rose of Finland
- (France) Officer of the Legion of Honour
- (Finland) 4th Class of the Order of the Cross of Liberty with Swords
- (Nazi Germany) 3rd Class of the Order of the German Eagle
- (Finland) Finnish War Memorial Medal (Finsk krigsminnesmedalj)
- (Finland) Finnish Air Force's aviation badge (Finska luftstridskrafternas flygmärke)
- (France) French Air Force's aviation badge (Franska luftstridskrafternas flygmärke)
- (Poland) Polish Air Force's aviation badge (Polska luftstridskrafternas flygmärke)
- (Italy) Italian Air Force's aviation badge (Italienska luftstridskrafternas flygmärke)

== Bibliography ==
- Bjuggren, Björn (1965). Attack: minnen från trettiofem års flygtjänst (in Swedish). Stockholm: Norstedt. SELIBR 8074958.
- Bjuggren, Björn (1942). Svenska flygare i österled (in Swedish). Stockholm: Bonnier. SELIBR 1389361.
- Bjuggren, Björn (1936). Bombflyget: uppträdande : verkan : möjligheter. Skrifter / Militärlitteraturföreningens förlag, 99-0578882-4; 178 (in Swedish). Stockholm. SELIBR 1373406.

Military offices
Preceded by Egmont Tornberg	Jämtland Wing; 1943–1947	Succeeded by Hugo Svenow
Preceded by Gustaf Adolf Westring	Royal Swedish Air Force Staff College; 1947–1949	Succeeded by Björn Lindskog
Preceded by Paulus af Uhr	1st Air Command; 1952–1964	Succeeded by Stig Norén
Government offices
Preceded by Carl Årmann	War Materials Inspector; 1965–1968	Succeeded by Bo Gejrot
