= Jämtland Wing =

Coordinates: 63.1900°N 14.4950°E

- Jämtlands flygflottilj
- Active: 1926–2004
- Country: Sweden
- Allegiance: Swedish Armed Forces
- Branch: Swedish Air Force
- Type: Corps (1926–1936); Wing (1936–1981); Sector wing (1981–1994); Wing (1994–2004)
- Role: Recon wing (1926–1948); Bomb wing (1936–1946); Fighter wing (1946–2004)
- Part of: 1st Air Command (1938–40, 1942–48); 2nd Air Command (1948–1957); 4th Air Command (1957–1966); Milo NN (1966–1993); Milo N (1993–2000); OPIL (2000–2004)
- Garrison/HQ: Östersund/Frösön
- Motto: Semper vigilans ("Always vigilant")
- March: "Fjärde flygkårens marsch" (Lindström) (Note: The march was established on 1 December 1972.)

Insignia
- Roundel

Aircraft flown
- Attack: A 1
- Bomber: B 4, B 5, B 17A
- Electronic warfare: Sk 37E
- Fighter: J 3, J 26, J 28B, J 29F, J 32B, J 35D, JA 37
- Multirole helicopter: Hkp 2, Hkp 3, Hkp 10
- Reconnaissance: S 1, S 6, S 14
- Trainer: Sk 11, Sk 12, Sk 15, Sk 16, Sk 50, Sk 37
- Transport: Tp 1, Tp 2, Tp 4, Tp 5, Tp 78, Tp 83
- G 101, Se 102, Se 103, Se 104, JAS 39A

Jämtland Wing (Swedish: Jämtlands flygflottilj), also F 4 Frösön, or simply F 4, is a former Swedish Air Force wing with the main base located at Åre Östersund Airport outside Östersund on Frösön in the middle of Sweden.

== History ==
The airbase was set up in 1926 as the 4th Air Corps at the old base of Jämtland Ranger Regiment at Frösö läger (Frösö camp). The main task was to perform reconnaissance for army units.

In 1930, the duties were extended to bombing with B 4 and later B 5 planes.

In 1936, the Flying Corps was reorganized as its own branch (the Air Force) and the unit was renamed Jämtlands Flygflottilj (Jämtland Wing).

In 1947, the wing was yet again redesigned as a fighter wing and received surplus P-51 Mustangs designated as J 26. These were only kept for five years until they were replaced by J 28A jets in 1952. Again, after only four years, they were in turn replaced by J 29A in 1956.

In 1967, the J 32B entered service at the wing only to be replaced again in 1969 by J 35D. These served until 1984 when the Saab 37 Viggen was introduced, and served the wing for 20 years.

Former Swedish Prime Minister Stefan Löfven famously served as a Munitions Systems specialist Conscript with the F 4 Wing for the duration of his 1-year compulsory military service in 1976-77.

The JAS 39 Gripen served briefly for only a year as a replacement for the Viggens until the wing was decommissioned in 2005.

The airfield is known today as Åre Östersund Airport (IATA: OSD, ICAO: ESNZ).

== Barracks and training areas ==
In the rangers' old camp below Frösö Church on Frösön outside Östersund. The wing had a runway in the north-west-southeast direction.

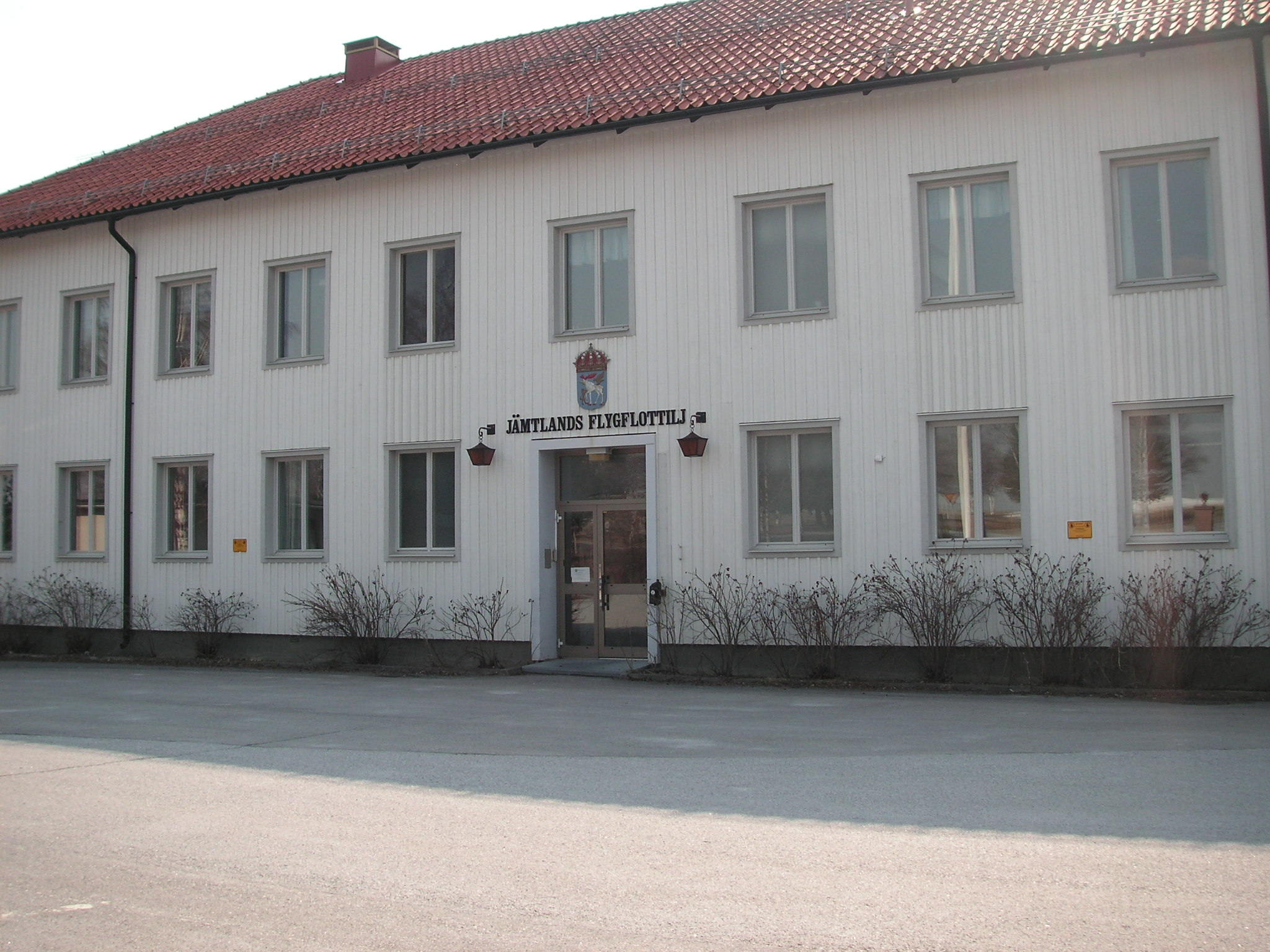
Chancellery building

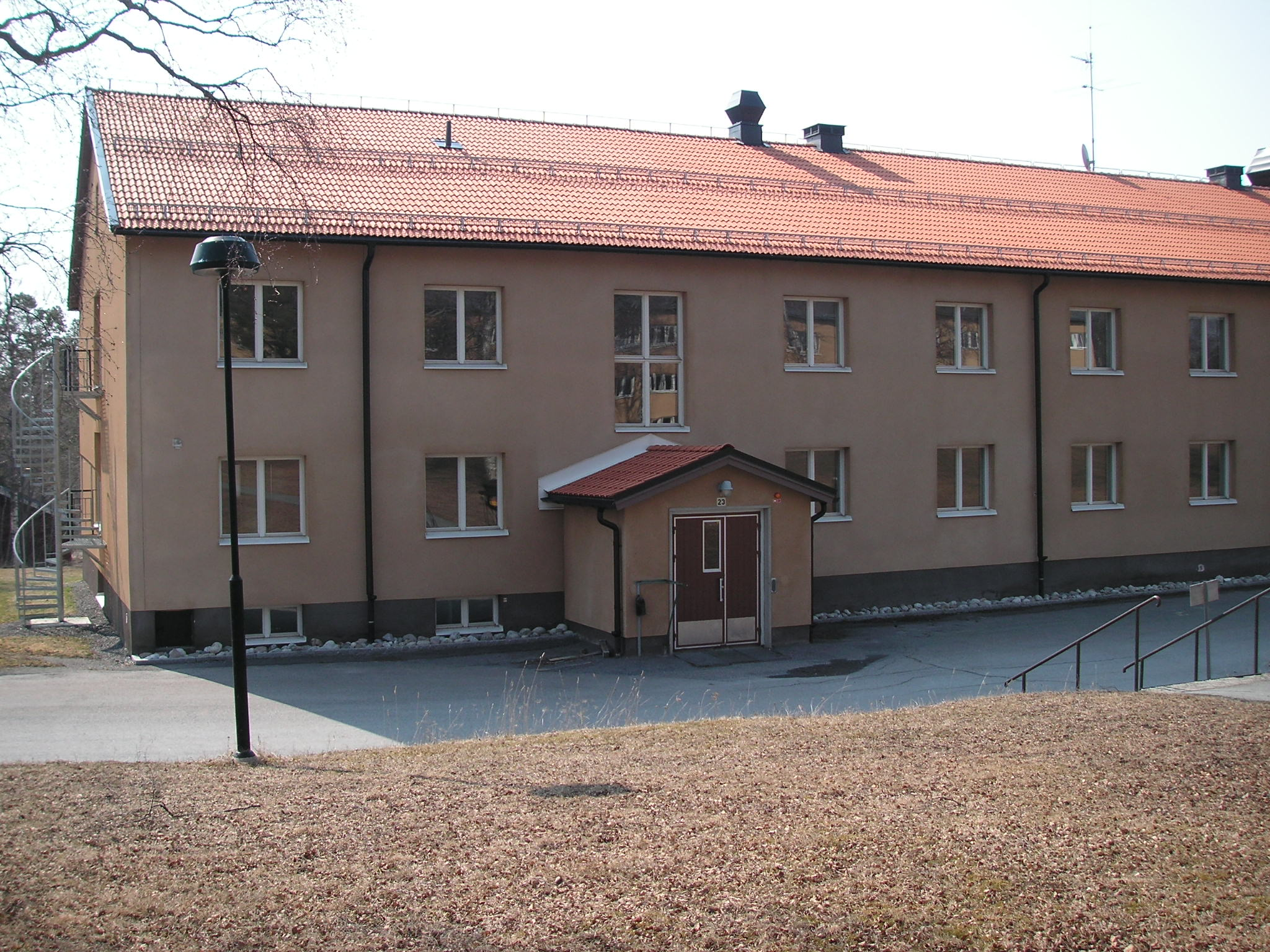
Barracks

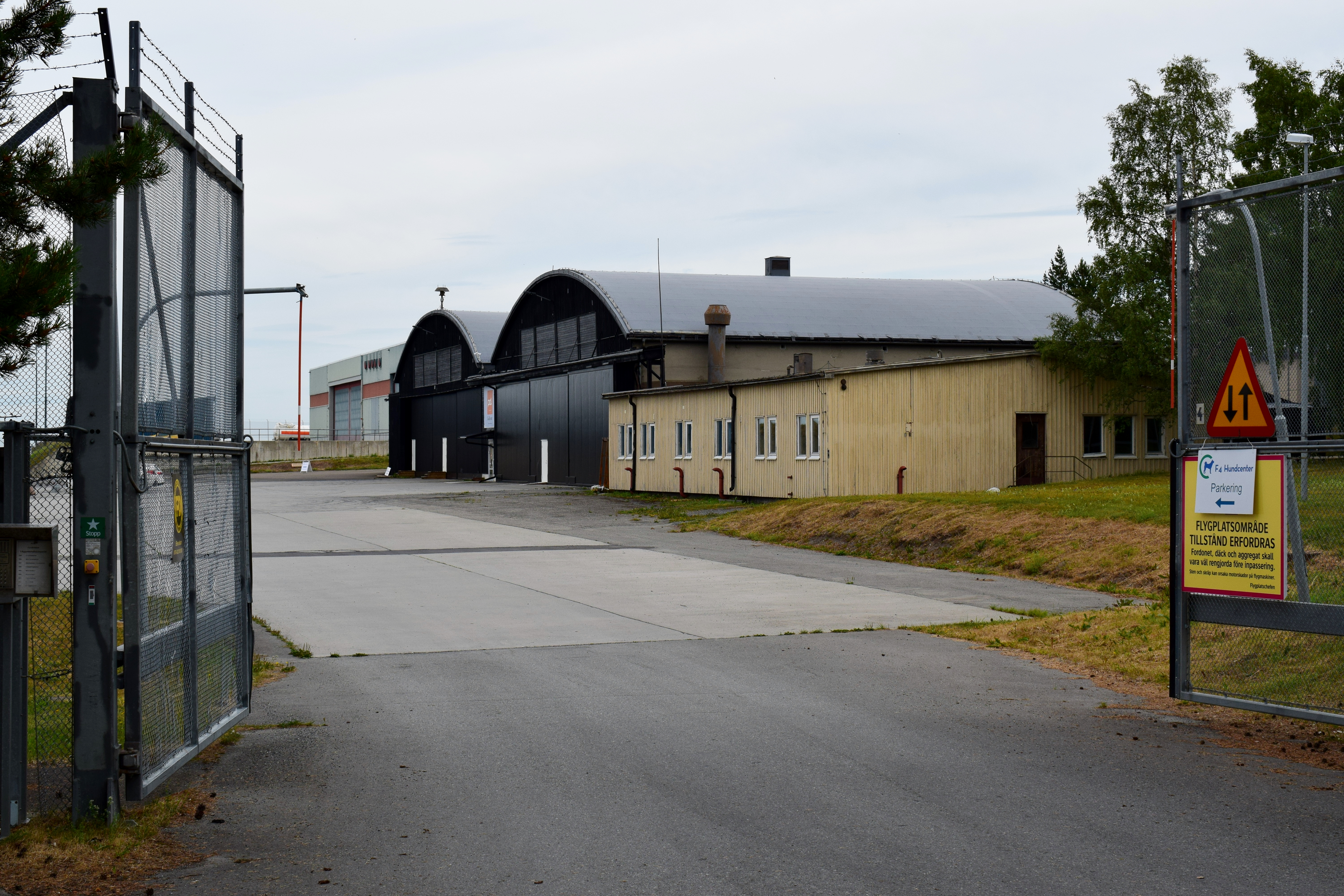
Hangar in 2018

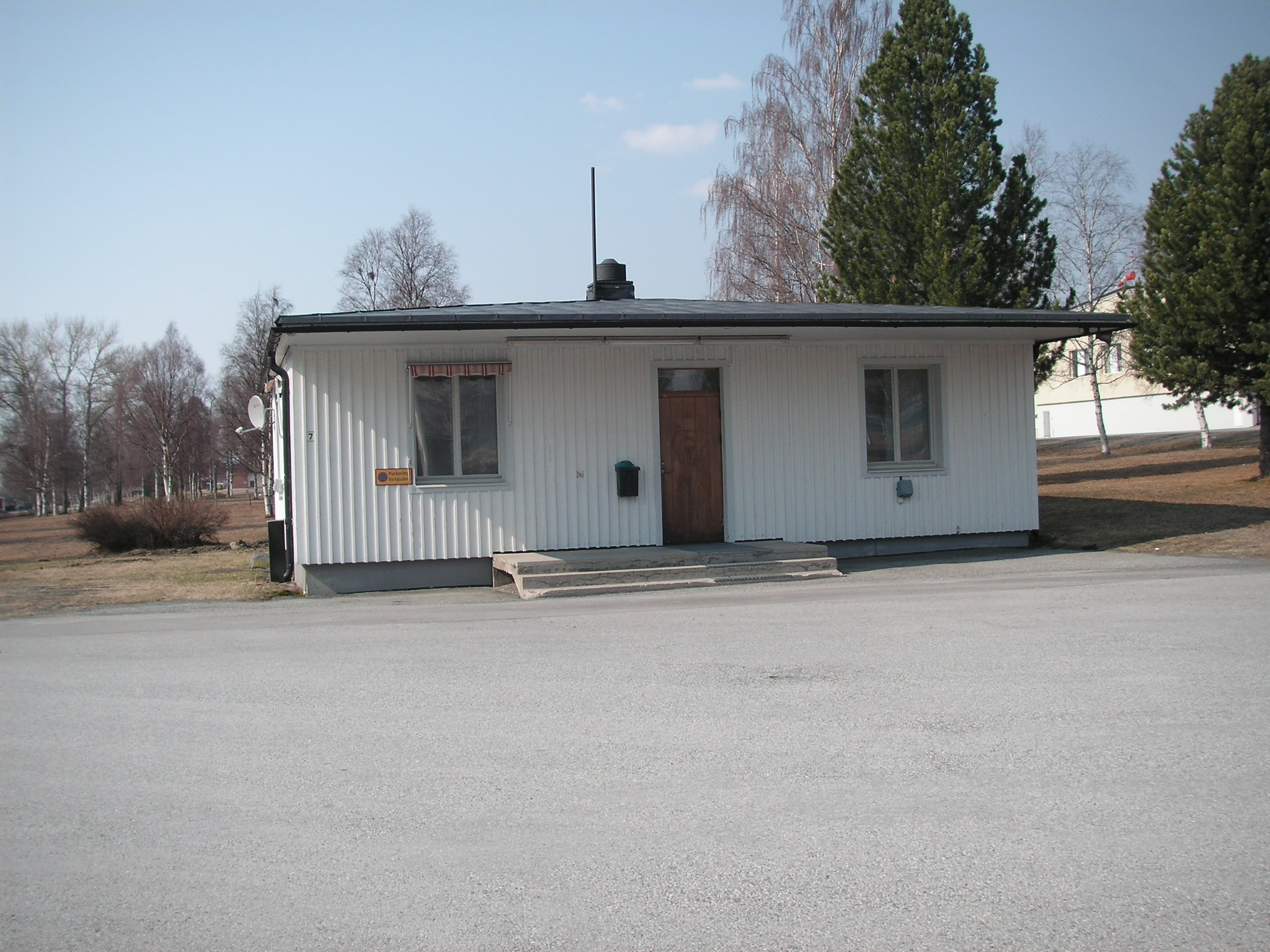
Old guardhouse

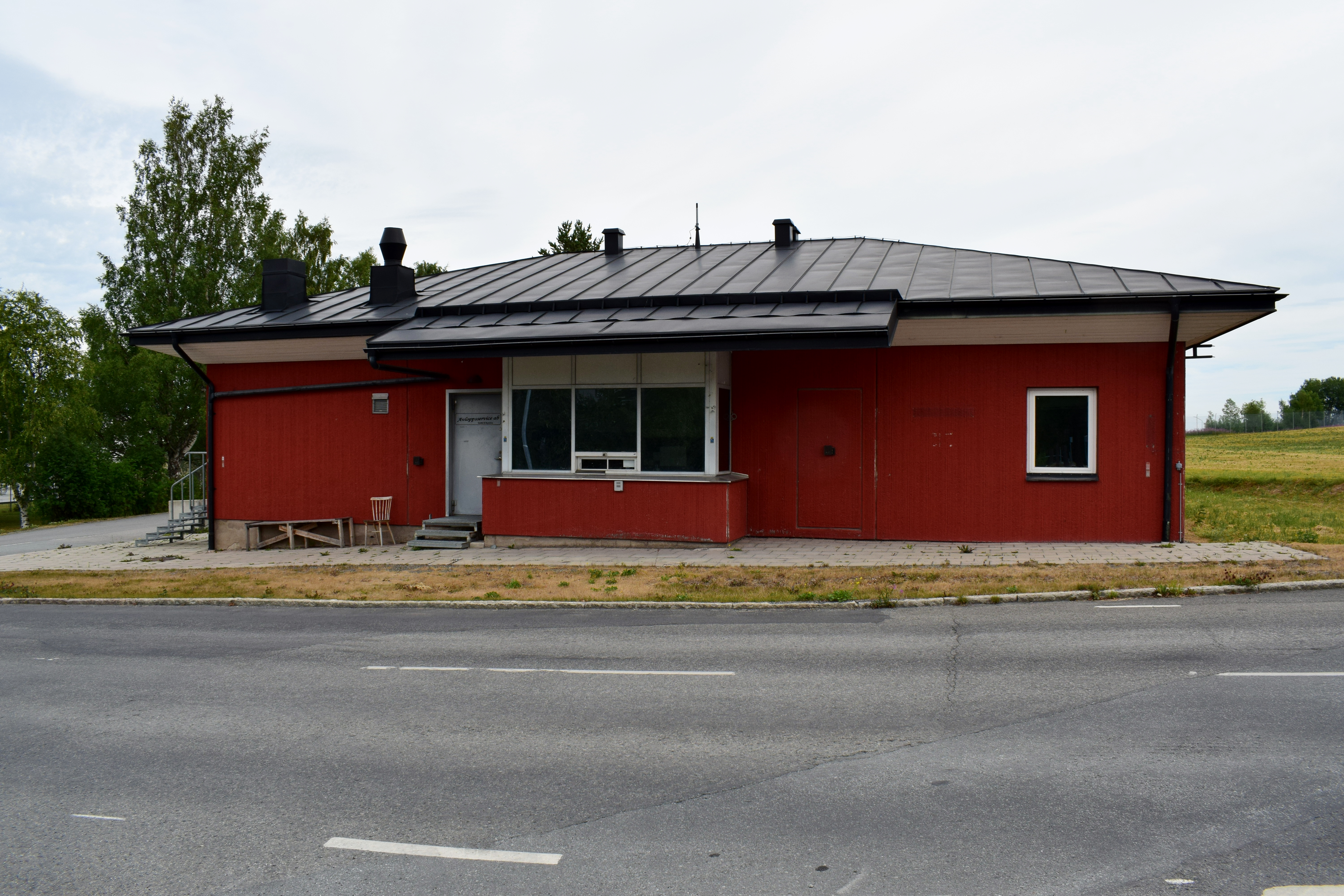
New guardhouse

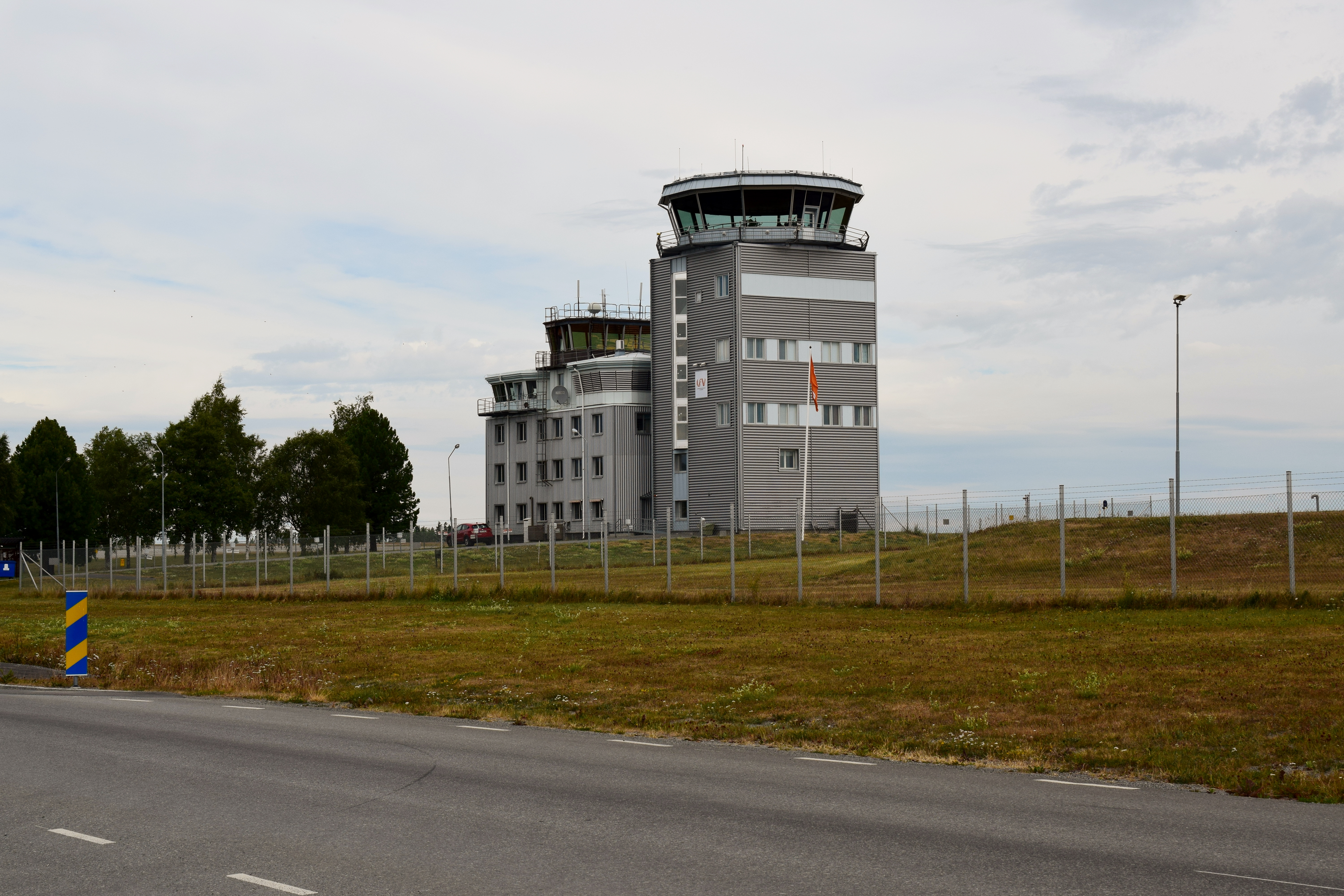
Control tower

== Heraldry and traditions ==
=== Coat of arms ===
The first coat of arms of the Jämtland Wing was used from 1944 to 1994. Blazon: "Azure, the provincial badge of Jämtland, an elk passant argent, attacked on the back by a rising falcon and in the front by a rampant dog both or; all animals armed and langued gules." The second coat of arms was used from 1994 to 2004. Blazon: "Azure, the provincial badge of Jämtland, an elk passant argent, attacked on the back by a rising falcon and in the front by a rampant dog both or; all animals armed and langued gules, a chief azure over a string or, charged with a winged two-bladed propeller or."

Coat of arms used from 1926 to 1994.

Coat of arms used from 1994 to 2004.

=== Colours, standards and guidons ===
The units first colour was presented to the wing on 6 June 1939 at F 8 at Barkarby by His Majesty the King Gustaf V. Blazon: "On blue cloth in the centre the badge of the Air Force; a winged two-bladed propeller under a royal crown proper, all or. In the first corner the provincial badge of Jämtland; an elk passant, attacked on its back by a rising falcon and in the front by a rampant dog, all or. This colour was transferred to the Statens försvarshistoriska museer.

The units last colour was presented to the wing at Frösö by His Majesty the King Carl XVI Gustaf on 2 September 2001. The colour is drawn by Kristina Holmgård-Åkerberg and embroidered by machine and hand in insertion technique by the company Libraria. Blazon: "On blue cloth in the centre the badge of the Air Force; a winged two-bladed propeller under a royal crown proper, all in yellow. In the first corner the provincial badge of Jämtland; a white elk passant, attacked on its back by a rising falcon and in the front by a rampant dog, both yellow; all animals armed red. In the second corner the provincial badge of Hälsingland; a yellow buck rampant, armed and langued red (a legacy from the former Hälsinge Wing, F 15).

=== March ===
"Fjärde flygkårens marsch" was composed by Verner Lindström, music director at Jämtland Ranger Regiment. It was originally established on 1 December 1972 by the Chief of the Air Force.

=== Medals ===
In 1999, the Jämtlands flygflottiljs (F 4) förtjänstmedalj ("Jämtland Wing (F 4) Medal of Merit") in gold and silver (JämtlffljGM/SM), of the 8th size and oval in shape, was established. The medal ribbon is blue with a moiré with broad yellow edges and a green line in the middle, followed on each side by a white stripe.

In 2005, the Jämtlands flygflottiljs (F 4) minnesmedalj ("Jämtland Wing (F 4) Commemorative Medal") in silver (JämtlffljMSM) of the 8th size was established. The medal ribbon is of blue moiré with broad yellow edges and a green line in the middle, followed on both sides by a white stripe. A miniature of the coat of arms of the wing is attached to the ribbon.

Ribbon bar of the medal of merit

Ribbon bar of the commemorative medal

== Commanding officers ==
From 1926 to 1936, the commanding officer was referred to as kårchef ("corps commander") and had the rank of major. When the wing organization was introduced in 1936, the commanding officer was referred to as flottiljchef ("wing commander"), and had the rank of lieutenant colonel. At the end of the 1940s, the wing commander got the rank of colonel. From 1980 to 1994, the wing commander was referred to as sektorflottiljchef ("sector wing commander") and had the rank of senior colonel. From 1994 to 2006, the commanding officer was again referred to as flottiljchef ("wing commander"), and had the rank of colonel.

=== Corps, wing and sector wing commanders ===
- 1926–1934: Gösta von Porat
- 1931–1932: Åge Lundström (acting)
- 1934–1937: Georg Gärdin
- 1937–1943: Egmont Tornberg
- 1943–1947: Björn Bjuggren
- 1947–1961: Carl Otto Hugosson
- 1961–1966: Kjell Rasmusson
- 1966–1968: Erik Nygren
- 1969–1973: Evert Båge
- 1973–1977: Harry Winblad
- 1977–1985: Rolf Gustafsson
- 1985–1990: Svante Liljedahl
- 1990–1994: Gunnar Ståhl
- 1994–1996: Tord Karlsson
- 1996–1998: Frank Fredriksson
- 1998–2000: Ola Gynäs
- 2000–2003: Jan Salestrand
- 2003–2005: Tommy Bengtsson
- 2005–2006: Hans Hansson
- 2006–2006: Lena Hallin

=== Deputy sector wing commanders ===
In order to relieve the sector wing commander, a deputy sector wing commander position was added in 1980. Its task was to lead the unit procurement, a task largely similar to the old wing commander position. Hence, he was also referred to as flottiljchef ("wing commander"). The deputy sector wing commander had the rank of colonel. On 30 June 1994, the deputy sector wing commander position was terminated.

- 1980–1983: Robert Gustafsson
- 1983–1984: Owe Wiktorin
- 1984–1987: Michael von Rosen
- 1987–1989: Lennart Brodin
- 1989–1993: Bert Darby

== Names, designations and locations ==
Name	Translation	From		To
Fjärde flygkåren	4th Air Corps	1926-07-01	–	1936-06-30
Kungl. Jämtlands flygflottilj	Royal Jämtland Wing	1936-07-01	–	1974-12-31
Jämtlands flygflottilj	Jämtland Wing; Jämtland Air Group	1975-01-01	–	2004-12-31
Avvecklingsorganisation F 4	Decommissioning Organization F 4	2005-01-01	–	2006-06-30
Designation		From		To
F 4		1926	–	1957-09-30
F 4/Se N3		1957-10-01	–	1981-06-30
F 4/Se NN		1981-07-01	–	1994-06-30
F 4		1994-07-01	–	2004-12-31
AO F 4		2005-01-01	–	2006-06-30
Location		From		To
Frösö Airport		1926-07-01	–	2006-06-30

== See also ==
- Swedish Armed Forces
- Swedish Air Force
- List of military aircraft of Sweden
