= Jeanna Falk =

Swedish expressionist dancer & dance teacher

Jeanna Bjuggren, known by her maiden name Jeanna Falk (15 August 1901 – 16 July 1980) was a Swedish dancer and dance teacher.

Falk was born in Stockholm, Sweden. She studied dance and music in Hellerau, Dresden, she studied under Jaques-Dalcroze from 1920 to 1921 and Mary Wigman from 1921 to 1923, where she was teaching a diploma. Jeanna Falk debuted after dancing evenings on the continent in Stockholm in 1924. She learned the art of expressive movement at the plastic Institute. She undertook study trips to Germany, Austria and Italy. Falk became a teacher at the Royal Dramatic Theatre on the topic of dance in 1926 and at the Royal College of Music, Stockholm from 1939. She performed dance pieces of a Midsummer Night’s Dream at the Royal Dramatic Theatre in 1927, and the Merchant of Venice at the Royal Swedish Opera in 1930, and inside the gates at Vasateatern in 1936.

Jeanna Falk, whose parents were Ferdinand Falk and Ida Rosenberger, married Björn Bjuggren (1904–1968) in 1933. She died in 1980 in Stockholm and was buried at Lidingö Cemetery.
