= 1st Air Command (Sweden) =

- Första flygeskadern
- Active: 1938–1995
- Country: Sweden
- Allegiance: Swedish Armed Forces
- Branch: Swedish Air Force
- Type: Mixed (1938–1948); Attack (1948–1995)
- Size: Group
- Part of: Southern Military District
- Garrison/HQ: Karlsborg (1938-1942); Stockholm (1942–1957); Gothenburg (1957–1995)
- Nickname: ÖB:s klubba

Insignia
- Roundel

Aircraft flown
- Attack: A 21A-3; A 32A Lansen; AJ 37 Viggen
- Bomber: B 3 Junkers; B 4 Hawker Hart; B 17; B 18; B 18B
- Fighter: J 8 Gloster Gladiator; J 21; J 21R
- Reconnaissance: S 6 Fokker
- T 18B

The 1st Air Command (Swedish: Första flygeskadern, E 1), previously named Air Command (Swedish: Flygeskadern) and later named Attack Command (Swedish: Attackeskadern) was an air group unit in the Swedish Air Force. The 1st Air Command was the collective name given to the attack wings who would jointly carry out heavier attacks in the event of war. It was active in various formations from 1938 to 1995. It was directly subordinate to the Supreme Commander of the Swedish Armed Forces and therefore nicknamed ÖB:s klubba ("Supreme Commander's club").

== Naming ==
Since its foundation in 1926, the Swedish Air Force grouped its aircraft into Flygkår (Air Corps, like the Första flygkåren, Andra flygkåren, Tredje flygkåren - the First, the Second, the Third Air Corps etc.), this being the aviation equivalent of an army regiment. In 1936 the Swedish Air Force switched from army-like to navy-like naming of its flying units. Thus the "air corps" became "flying flotillas" (flygflottiljer, sing. flygflottilj) with the respective geographic region added as an official name, thus the Second Air Corps (Andra Flygkår) established in 1926 became the Second Royal Roslagen Flying Flotilla (Andra Kungliga Roslagens Flygflottilj) in 1936. Following the naval nomenclature these flying flotillas were further divided into divisions (divisioner, sing. division) like the navy's destroyer divisions.

In the end of 1938, the Swedish Air Force formed an air squadron (flygeskader) in the end of 1938. In 1942, it became the 1st Air Squadron (Första Flygeskadern, E 1), with the 2nd and 3rd to follow in 1943 and the 4th in 1945. So the traditional Swedish naming of air units is as follows:

- Eskader or Flygeskader - USAF Air Division or RAF Air Group equivalent
- Flottilj or Flygflottilj - USAF Air Wing or RAF Station equivalent
- Division - Air Squadron
- Grupp - Flight

== History ==
According to the Defence Act of 1936, an air group commander would in case of war carry out the immediate command of the Swedish Air Force units that were part of the air command. In peacetime, his duties were to plan exercises, inspect wing exercises, and conduct co-exercises and major practical exercises, that is, not to have constant command of Swedish Air Force wings. Flygeskadern (the "Air Command") was organized in response to the emergency preparedness in September 1939 and was resolved (except for the staff) in the latter part of 1940. According to the Defence Act of 1942, four air commands would be permanently organized and in peacetime command the constituent wings regarding tactical and operational exercises. Its staff was located in Karlsborg from 1939 to 1942. In 1942, the Swedish Air Force expanded its war organization into four air commands and the Air Command was renamed 1st Air Command (Första flygeskadern, E 1), with its staff in Stockholm. The distribution of the Swedish Air Force wings to the air commands varied from 1 July 1945, when all four air commands had been organized. The 1st Air Command had attack duties, the 2nd and 3rd Air Command had fighter duties and the 4th Air Command had reconnaissance duties.

The staff were merged with the staff of the Western Air Defence District (Flybo V) on 1 October 1957, and was placed in Gothenburg. This air command was meant to have attack duties. Its command center Björn, was located south of Skara. In 1966, the 1st Air Command became the only air command in the Swedish Air Force, when the three others were decommissioned. The commander of the 1st Air Command was subordinate to the Supreme Commander of the Swedish Armed Forces according to instruction by the King in Council. Issues concerning unit training and production, the commander of the 1st Air Commandwas subordinate to the Chief of the Air Force. The 1st Air Command was then renamed Attackeskadern ("Attack Command") and was led by a joint staff based in Gothenburg until it was decommissioned in 1995. The decommissioning decision came in conjunction with the Defence Act of 1992, in which it was decided that three geographic air commands were to be established on 1 July 1993 and subsequently retrieved the duties from the 1st Air Command. At the decommissioning, the traditions and history of the 1st Air Command were transferred to the Chief of Air Force Staff, which on 30 June 1998 handed them over to the Air Force Center.

== Organisation ==
=== 1938–1940 ===
Wings	Type	Main aircraft	Comment
F 1 Hässlö	Medium bomber	B 3 Junkers	
F 3 Malmslätt	Reconnaissance	S 6 Fokker	
F 4 Frösön	Light bomber / Dive bomber	B 4 Hawker Hart	
F 8 Barkarby	Fighter	J 8 Gloster Gladiator	

=== 1942–1948 ===
Wings	Type	Main aircraft	Comment
F 1 Hässlö	Bomber	B 18	
F 4 Frösön	Light bomber	B 17	
F 12 Kalmar	Light bomber	B 17	
F 15 Söderhamn	Day-time fighter	J 21	

=== 1948–1957 ===
Wings	Type	Main aircraft	Comment
F 6 Karlsborg	Attack	A 21A-3	
F 7 Såtenäs	Attack	J 21R / B 18B	
F 14 Halmstad	Attack	B 18B	
F 17 Kallinge	Attack	T 18B	

=== 1957–1966 ===
Wings	Type	Main aircraft	Comment
F 6 Karlsborg	Attack	A 32A Lansen	
F 7 Såtenäs	Attack	A 32A Lansen	
F 14 Halmstad	Attack	A 32A Lansen	Removed in 1961, and replaced by F 15
F 15 Söderhamn	Attack	A 32A Lansen	Added in 1961, and replaced F 14
F 17 Kallinge	Attack	A 32A Lansen	

=== 1966–1995 ===
Wings	Type	Main aircraft	Comment
F 6 Karlsborg	Attack	A 32A Lansen. AJ 37 Viggen from 1977	
F 7 Såtenäs	Attack	A 32A Lansen. AJ 37 Viggen from 1973	
F 15 Söderhamn	Attack	A 32A Lansen. AJ 37 Viggen from 1974	
F 17 Kallinge	Attack	A 32A Lansen until 1975	Removed from E 1 after rearmament to fighter wing

== Commanding officers ==
Between 1938 and 1941 and 1994 to 1995 the commander had the rank of colonel. Between 1941 and 1994, the commander had the rank of major general.

=== Commanders ===
List of commanders:

- 1938-01-07 – 1942-06-30: Major General Bengt Nordenskiöld
- 1942-07-01 – 1952-03-31: Major General Paulus af Uhr
- 1952-04-01 – 1964-03-31: Major General Björn Bjuggren
- 1964-04-01 – 1966-09-30: Major General Stig Norén
- 1966-10-01 – 1973-03-31: Major General Gösta Odqvist
- 1973-04-04 – 1977-06-30: Major General Bengt Rosenius
- 1977-07-01 – 1980-09-30: Major General Sven-Olof Olson
- 1980-10-01 – 1983-09-30: Major General Erik Nygren
- 1983-10-01 – 1990-09-30: Major General Bertil Nordström
- 1990-10-01 – 1994-10-01: Major General Bert Stenfeldt
- 1994-10-01 – 1995-06-30: Colonel Christer Salsing (acting)

=== Deputy commanders ===
After the air defence districts were decommissioned on 30 September 1957, a deputy commander position was added. The deputy commander had the rank of colonel. When all the air groups (except the 1st Air Command) were decommissioned in 1966, the deputy commander position disappeared.

- 1957–1964: Lieutenant Colonel Gösta Sandberg (acting)
- 1964–1966: Colonel Karl-Erik Karlsson

== Names, designations and locations ==
Name	Translation	From		To
Flygeskadern	Air Command	1938	–	1942
Första flygeskadern	1st Air Command	1942	–	1966
Attackeskadern	Attack Command	1966	–	1995-06-30
Designation		From		To
E 1		1938	–	1995-06-30
Location		From		To
Karlsborg		1938	–	1942
Stockholm		1942	–	1957
Gothenburg		1957-10-01	–	1995-06-30
