= Einar Westerberg =

Swedish physician (1893–1976)

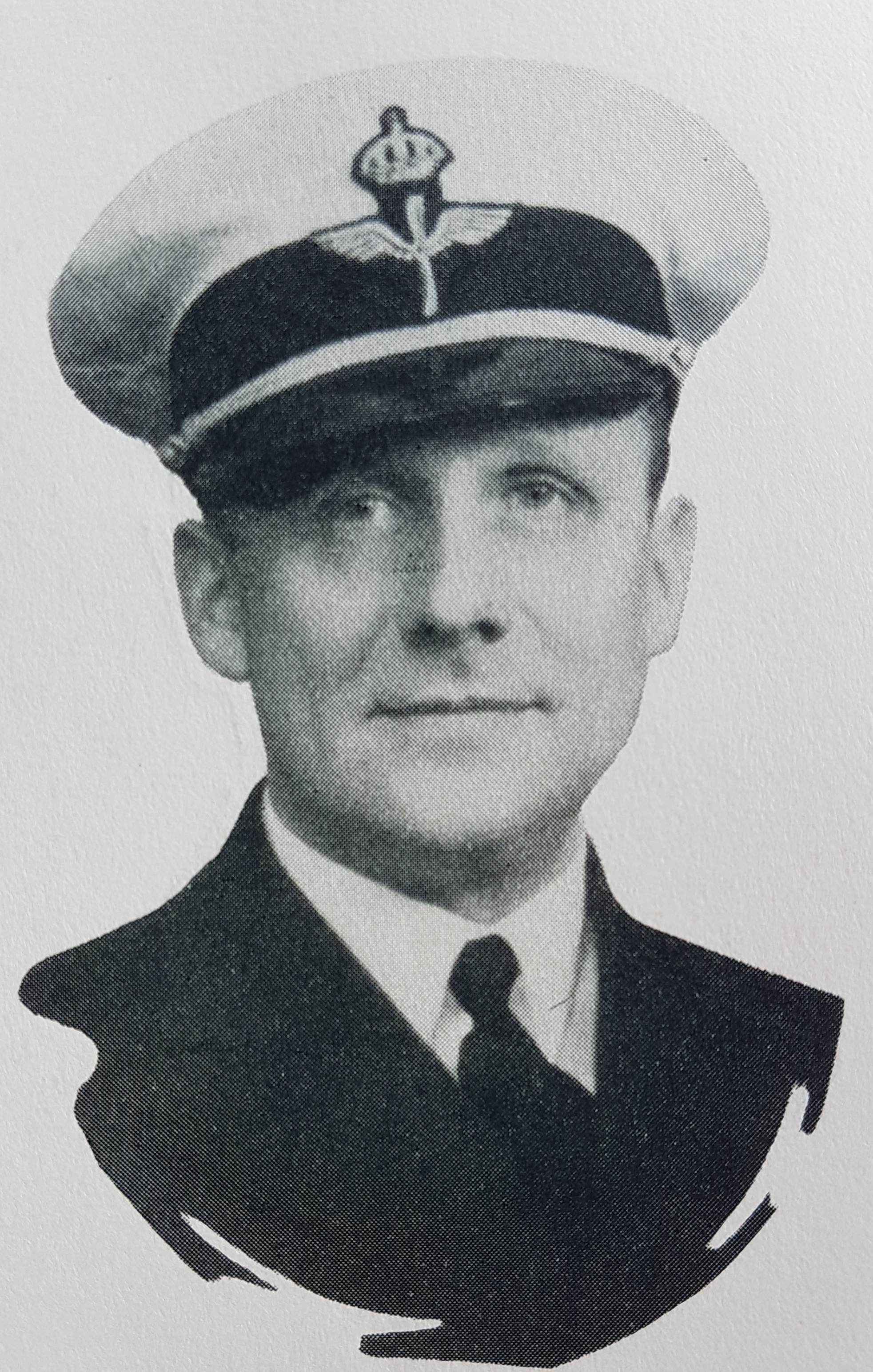
- Born: Claes Einar Westerberg; 28 October 1893; Stockholm, Sweden
- Died: 8 December 1976 (aged 83); Stockholm, Sweden
- Years active: 1916–1952
- Medical career
- Profession: Flight surgeon, naval surgeon
- Field: Aviation medicine, naval medicine
- Awards: See below

Claes Einar Westerberg (28 October 1893 – 8 December 1976) was a Swedish physician. He served as Surgeon-in-Chief of the Swedish Air Force from 1940 to 1952.

== Early life ==
Westerberg was born on 28 October 1893 in Hedvig Eleonora Parish, Stockholm, Sweden, the son of Claes Westerberg and his wife Constance (née Löfgren). He passed studentexamen in Stockholm in 1911 and received a Bachelor of Medical Sciences degree in Stockholm in 1914.

== Career ==
Westerberg received a Licentiate of Medical Science degree in Stockholm in 1919 and had various appointments as assistant physician between 1916 and 1922. He joined the Swedish Naval Medical Officers' Corps in 1917 and became a naval surgeon of the 2nd class in 1919 after which he had different positions such as ship's doctor and more between 1917 and 1919. Westerberg was appointed naval surgeon of the 1st class in the Naval Medical Officers' Corps in 1920, and served as assistant doctor in Vaxholm Coastal Artillery Regiment (KA 1) from 1920 to 1929, as acting battalion doctor in Vaxholm Grenadier Regiment (I 26) from 1922 to 1926, acting regimental physician from 1926 to 1927, physician in Göta Life Guards (I 2) from 1928 to 1931. Westerberg was appointed 1st naval surgeon in 1929 and 1st flight surgeon the same year. He then served as doctor at Vaxholm Fortress from 1929 to 1931 when he was appointed as the first Surgeon-in-Chief of the Swedish Air Force in the Swedish Air Force. He would serve in this position until 1952 when he entered the air force reserve.

Westerberg undertook study tours to various countries' air forces; to Switzerland in 1921, Germany, Czechoslovakia and Poland in 1934, Belgium and Germany in 1935, England and Germany in 1938. He was a practicing physician in Stockholm from 1931. Westerberg was chief physician at the insurance company Holmia from 1931 to 1965, Haand i Haand and National from 1932, and in Zurich from 1939 to 1967, as well as in Northern Europe from 1949.

Westerberg also served as the Swedish government's representative at the III International Congress on Sanitary Aviation in Brussels in 1935 and at the 16th International Red Cross Conference in London in 1938. He was also the Swedish government's representative at the congress in Stockholm in 1948, member and vice-chairman of the National Swedish Research Committee on Aviation and Naval Medicine (Flyg- och navalmedicinska nämnden) from 1946 to 1953, and chairman of the Scandinavian Association for Aviation Medicine (Skandinavisk förening för flygmedicin) from 1952 to 1954. Westerberg was a member of the Statistical Table Commission (Statistiska tabellkommissionen) from 1932.

== Personal life ==
In 1920, Westerberg married Seidi Vilhelmina Lindblad (1893–1972), the daughter of station inspector Fingal Lindblad and Olga Wisselqvist. They had three children: Bertil (1921–2005), Göran (1923–2010), and Kerstin (born 1926).

== Death ==
Westerberg died on 8 December 1976 in Stockholm. He was interred on 27 January 1977 at Galärvarvskyrkogården in Stockholm.

== Awards and decorations ==
=== Swedish ===
- (Sweden) Commander 1st Class of the Order of the Polar Star (15 November 1949)
- (Sweden) Knight of the Order of the Polar Star (1938)
- (Sweden) Knight of the Order of Vasa (1932)
- (Sweden) Swedish Red Cross Silver Medal
- (Sweden) Stockholms fmflSM

=== Foreign ===
- (Norway) Commander of the Order of St. Olav with Star (1 July 1952)

== Honours ==
- Member of the Royal Swedish Academy of War Sciences (1944)
- Honorary Doctor of Medicine at Stockholm University College (1954)

== Bibliography ==
- Westerberg, Einar (1952). Några nyare rön inom flygmedicinen [Some recent findings in aviation medicine] (in Swedish). Stockholm: Kungl. Krigsvetenskapsakademien. SELIBR 12108109.
- Westerberg, Einar (1948). Flygtjänstgöringen som kroppsligen och själsligen förslitande faktor [Flight duty as a physically and mentally exhausting factor] (in Swedish). Stockholm. SELIBR 12050760.

Military offices
Preceded by None	Surgeon-in-Chief of the Swedish Air Force; 1940–1952	Succeeded by Gustaf Severin
