= Stig Norén =

Swedish Air Force officer

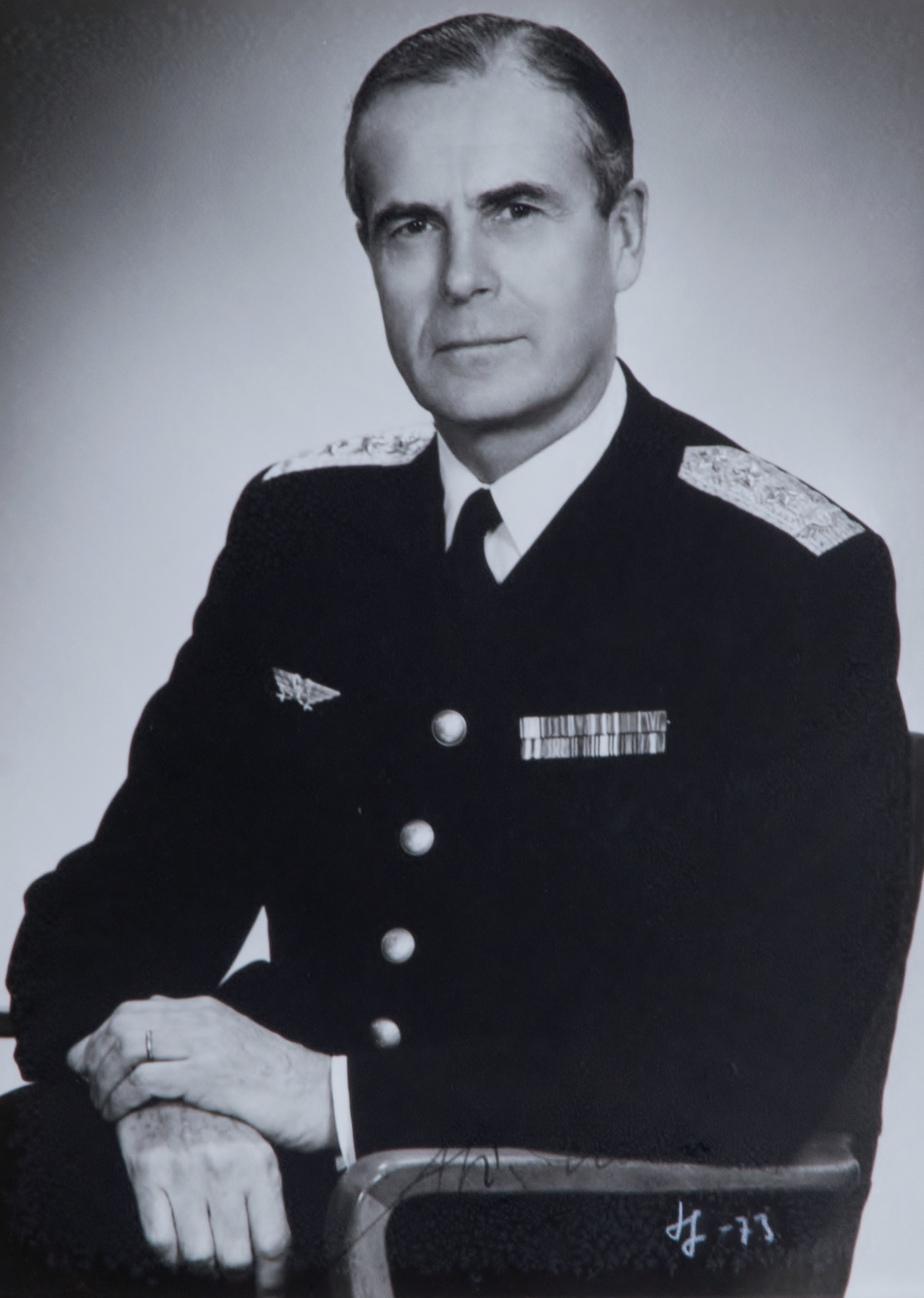
- Born: Carl Stig Norén; 10 May 1908; Stockholm, Sweden
- Died: 10 September 1996 (aged 88); Stockholm, Sweden
- Burial place: Norra begravningsplatsen
- Military career
- Allegiance: Sweden
- Branch: Swedish Navy (1930–36); Swedish Air Force (1936–73)
- Service years: 1930–1973
- Rank: General
- Commands: Skaraborg Wing; Inspector, Control and Reporting System; Chief of the Air Staff; 1st Air Command; Southern Military District; Chief of the Air Force

General Carl Stig Norén (10 May 1908 – 10 September 1996) was a Swedish Air Force officer. Norén started his military career in the Swedish Navy and was after a few years transferred to the Swedish Air Force where he would remain for over 30 years. Norén finished his career by being the Chief of the Air Force from 1968 to 1973.

== Early life ==
Norén was born on 10 May 1908 in Stockholm, Sweden, the son of the commander of the 1st rank Karl Norén and his wife Marianne (née af Sillén). He passed studentexamen in Gothenburg in 1927.

== Career ==
Norén was commissioned as an officer in the became Swedish Navy in 1930 with then rank of acting sub-lieutenant. Norén served aboard aircraft cruiser HSwMS Gotland, the Swedish Navy so far the only aircraft-carrying ship. Thus, he was also one of the few Swedish pilots who had experience in aircraft starting with aircraft catapult. Norén belonged to the group of young naval officers who early made their way over to the young and growing Swedish Air Force. Norén was promoted to underlöjtnant in 1932 and underwent flight training from 1932 to 1933 and was promoted to löjtnant in 1934. He was then transferred to the Swedish Air Force where he became löjtnant in 1936. Norén underwent the general course of the Royal Swedish Naval Staff College from 1937 to 1938 and served mainly at the Air Staff from 1938 to 1943.

Norén was promoted to kapten in 1940 and underwent the staff course of the Royal Swedish Air Force Staff College from 1941 to 1942. He was a teacher at the Royal Swedish Air Force Staff College from 1943 and was promoted to major in 1944. Norén was promoted to lieutenant colonel in 1947 and was head of the Operation Department at the Air Staff from 1947 to 1949 and was appointed commanding officer of the Skaraborg Wing (F 7) the following year. He was promoted to colonel in 1951. Norén was commanding officer of Skaraborg Wing from 1950 to 1957 and Inspector of the Control and Reporting System of the Swedish Air Force (Inspektören för luftbevakningen) from 1957 to 1960. As Inspector of the Control and Reporting System he contributed to the realization of the construction of the modern combat management and air surveillance system called STRIL 60.

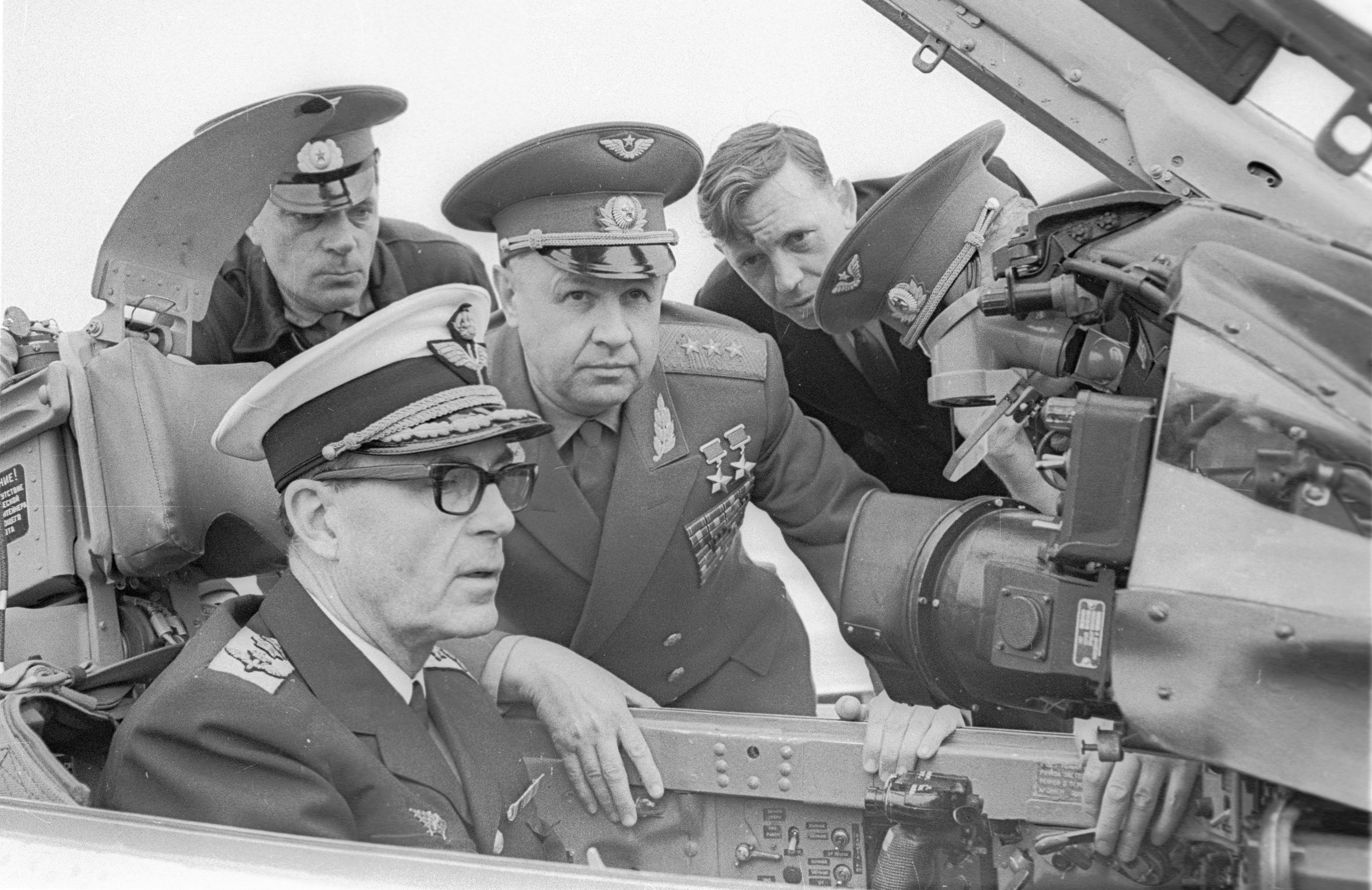
Lieutenant General Norén test a MiG-21 aircraft in the Soviet Union in 1972.

In 1960 Norén was promoted to major general and appointed Chief of the Air Staff. As Chief of the Air Staff, he was one of the promoters of a joint executive management of the entire Swedish defence. Norén stayed as Chief of the Air Staff until 1964 when he was appointed Commanding General of the 1st Air Command (E 1). After two years Norén was promoted to lieutenant general and was appointed military commander of the Southern Military District (Milo S). He was the first military commander of Milo S with overall responsibility for the army, navy and air force under the new military area organisation. Norén was appointed Chief of the Air Force in 1968 and was then faced with several difficult decisions. Increased financial resources coupled with increasing demands on the aircraft's performance and the effects of weapons imbued the defense debate. In the military command he conveyed his views in a way that created respect. He was then able to fulfill the Air Force's requirements, so that the Swedish air defense still would remain a significant factor in the Swedish defense. Norén would remain as Chief of the Air Force until 1973 when he retired and was promoted to full general.

== Personal life ==
In 1935 he married Ulla Nordenson (1910–1996), the daughter of Göran Nordenson and Märta Bagge. He was the father of Märta (born 1938) and Ebba (born 1939). Norén died on 10 September 1996, a few months after his wife, and they were both buried on 18 October 1996 buried at Norra begravningsplatsen in Stockholm.

== Dates of rank ==
- 1930 – Acting sub-lieutenant (Swedish Navy)
- 1932 – Underlöjtnant (Swedish Navy)
- 1934 – Lieutenant (Swedish Navy)
- 1936 – Lieutenant (Swedish Air Force)
- 1940 – Captain
- 1944 – Major
- 1947 – Lieutenant colonel
- 1951 – Colonel
- 1960 – Major general
- 1966 – Lieutenant general
- 1973 – General

== Awards and decorations ==
=== Swedish ===
- (Sweden) Commander Grand Cross of the Order of the Sword (6 June 1968)
- (Sweden) Commander 1st Class of the Order of the Sword (6 June 1957)
- (Sweden) Knight of the Order of Vasa
- (Sweden) Swedish Women's Voluntary Defence Organization Royal Medal of Merit in silver
- (Sweden) Swedish Association of Voluntary Observers Medal of Merit in silver
- (Sweden) Royal Swedish Aero Club's Gold Medal (Kungliga Svenska Aeroklubbens guldmedalj)

=== Foreign ===
- Commander Grand Cross of the Order of the Lion of Finland (December 1974)
- (Denmark) Grand Cross of the Order of the Dannebrog (August 1973)
- (Norway) Commander with Star of the Order of St. Olav (1 July 1961)
- (France) Aeronautical Medal

== Honours ==
- Member of the Royal Swedish Academy of War Sciences (1948)
- Honorary member of the Royal Swedish Society of Naval Sciences (1971)

Military offices
Preceded by Ingvar Berg	Skaraborg Wing; 1950–1957	Succeeded by Åke Sundén
Preceded by Greger Falk	Inspector of the Control and Reporting System; 1957–1960	Succeeded by Wilhelm Wagner
Preceded by Lennart Peyron	Chief of the Air Staff; 1960–1964	Succeeded by Gösta Odqvist
Preceded by Björn Bjuggren	1st Air Command; 1964–1966	Succeeded by Gösta Odqvist
Preceded by Tage Olihn	Southern Military District; 1966–1968	Succeeded by Oscar Krokstedt
Preceded by Claës-Henrik Nordenskiöld	Chief of the Air Force; 1968–1973	Succeeded by Dick Stenberg
Professional and academic associations
Preceded by Carl Eric Almgren	President of the Royal Swedish Academy of War Sciences; 1971–1975	Succeeded by Ove Ljung
