= Bengt Nordenskiöld =

Swedish Air Force officer

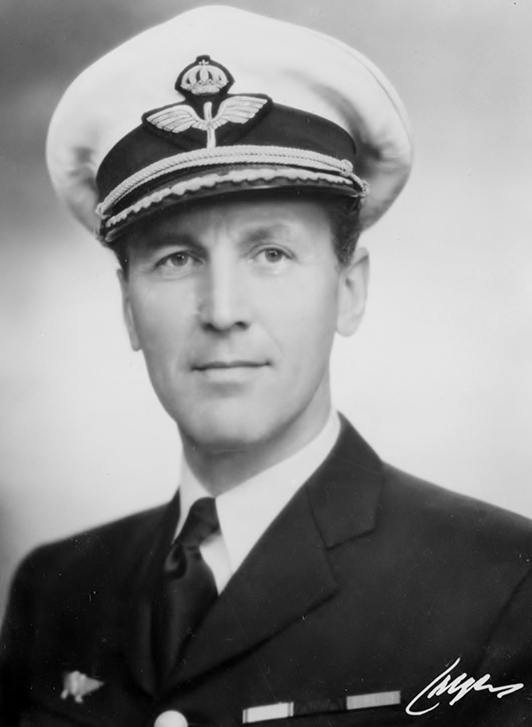
- Born: Bengt Gustafsson Nordenskiöld; 6 September 1891; Sundsvall, Sweden
- Died: 28 January 1983 (aged 91); Österhaninge, Sweden
- Relatives: Claës-Henrik Nordenskiöld (son)
- Military career
- Allegiance: Sweden
- Branch: Swedish Air Force
- Service years: 1910–1954
- Rank: General
- Commands: Chief of the Air Staff; Royal Air Force Staff College; Air Command; Chief of the Air Force

General Bengt Gustafsson Nordenskiöld (6 September 1891 – 28 January 1983) was a Swedish Air Force officer who served as Chief of the Air Force from 1942 to 1954. In 1910, Nordenskiöld started his military career as a volunteer in the Svea Life Guards (I 1), later attending the Royal Swedish Army Staff College. In 1928, he was made a captain in the General Staff. During 1931 he went through aircraft recognition training at the Swedish Air Force Flying School, after which he was trained as a pilot. In 1936, Nordenskiöld started to serve in the recently created Air Staff under Lieutenant General Torsten Friis, later becoming a lieutenant general. He was appointed Chief of the Swedish Air Force in 1942 as the first Chief of Air Force with pilot training. Nordenskiöld was promoted general and retired from active service in 1954.

== Early life ==
Nordenskiöld was born on 6 September 1891 in Sundsvall, Sweden, the son of managing director, Baron Henrik Nordensköld and his wife Ester Laura (née Andersson). He was a sea cadet from 1907 to 1908 and passed mogenhetsexamen at Lunds privata elementarskola on 10 June 1910 before enlisting as a volunteer at the Svea Life Guards (I 1) the day after.

== Career ==
=== Military career ===
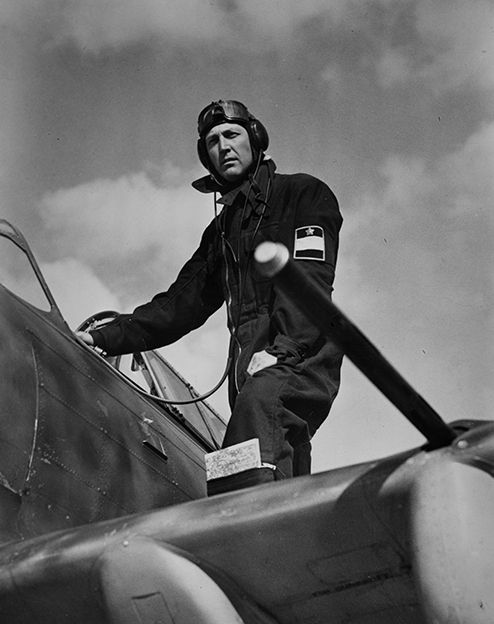
Nordenskiöld in 1941, just before an exercise that he led from his airplane.

Nordenskiöld enrolled at the Royal Military Academy on 19 October 1911 and graduated and became an officer of 19 December 1912. Nordenskiöld became an underlöjtnant in the Svea Life Guards on 31 December 1912 and lieutenant there on 28 November 1916. He was then educated at the Royal Swedish Army Staff College from 1922 to 1924, where he graduated first in his class in the staff course. He was an aspirant in the General Staff from 15 April 1925 to 1927 and was promoted to captain at the Svea Life Guards on 9 December 1927. Nordenskiöld served in the General Staff from 1 January 1928 and was trained in aerial reconnaissance in 1931 and served as a General Staff officer in the Eastern Military Division (Östra militärfördelningen) from 9 October 1931 to 1933. He served as a teacher of tactics at the Royal Swedish Army Staff College from 28 December 1933 to 1934 and became major in the General Staff from 27 April 1934 and underwent sergeant pilot training from 1934 to 1936. Nordenskiöld was promoted to lieutenant colonel in the Swedish Air Force and was appointed Chief of the Air Staff on 1 July 1936.

Nordenskiöld was promoted to colonel on 1 July 1937 and served as head of the Royal Swedish Air Force Staff College from 1 October 1939 to 30 September 1941 and commanding officer of the Air Command (E 1) from 1939 to 1942. He was promoted to major general on 6 June 1941 – as the youngest officer in modern Swedish history – which received great attention in the media. Nordenskiöld was promoted to lieutenant general and appointed Chief of the Air Force on 1 July 1942. He was the first pilot trained Chief of the Air Force and during the air wing visits, he flew a J 9 aircraft no. 19, which was to become his "personal" aircraft. It was with this aircraft he crashed during a start from the Swedish Air Force Flying School (F 5), and was badly injured but survived. When the post of Supreme Commander of the Swedish Armed Forces would be appointed in 1951, Nordenskiöld was one of the candidates that were considered by the government. According to Prime Minister Tage Erlander's diaries, his name was dropped because of his impetuous temper and his propensity to make own foreign policy statements. Instead the army general Nils Swedlund became the new supreme commander. Air Vice Marshal Ralph Cochrane visited Nordenskiöld and the Swedish Air Force 8–13 June 1952. What was discussed during the visit are not known. Cochrane left Svea Air Force Wing (F 8) north of Stockholm in an English Electric Canberra on the morning of 13 June, the same day as a Swedish radio and radar signals intelligence-gathering DC-3 aircraft was shot down by Soviet Air Force fighter jets. Nordenskiöld was promoted to general on 30 April 1954, two months before his retirement on 30 June 1954.

=== Other work ===
Nordenskiöld was vice chairman of the Royal Swedish Aero Club from 1937 to 1944 and board member of Skånska cement AB and AB Iföverken from 1939 to 1966. He was also chairman of the board of AB Salén & Wicander and Wiklunds bil AB from 1954 to 1972 and AB Godslagring from 1960 to 1972. Nordenskiöld was vice chairman of the board of AB Ekensbergs varv from 1955 to 1972.

== Personal life ==
On 16 October 1916, Nordenskiöld married Dagmar Werner (1897–1978), the daughter of the wholesaler Carl Linus Werner and Severina (Inez) Natalia (née Jehander). They had two children, Claës-Henrik Nordenskiöld (1917–2003), who also became an air force general, and Brita Christina (1919–1971) who was married 1940–1948 to Prince Ferdinand of Liechtenstein (1901–1981), a descendant of Prince Eduard Franz of Liechtenstein. Brita later remarried to Air Force Lieutenant Colonel Ulf Björkman.

Nordenskiöld and Dagmar Werner divorced on 12 September 1934 and on 31 October 1934, he married Marie-Louise Elsa Eva Hanna Augusta Lambert-Meuller (1909–1996), the daughter of managing director August Fredrik Lambert Meuller and Elsa (née Flygare). The marriage was childless. He was the grandfather of Louise Nordenskiöld and grandfather of Prince Hanno von Liechtenstein.

== Death ==
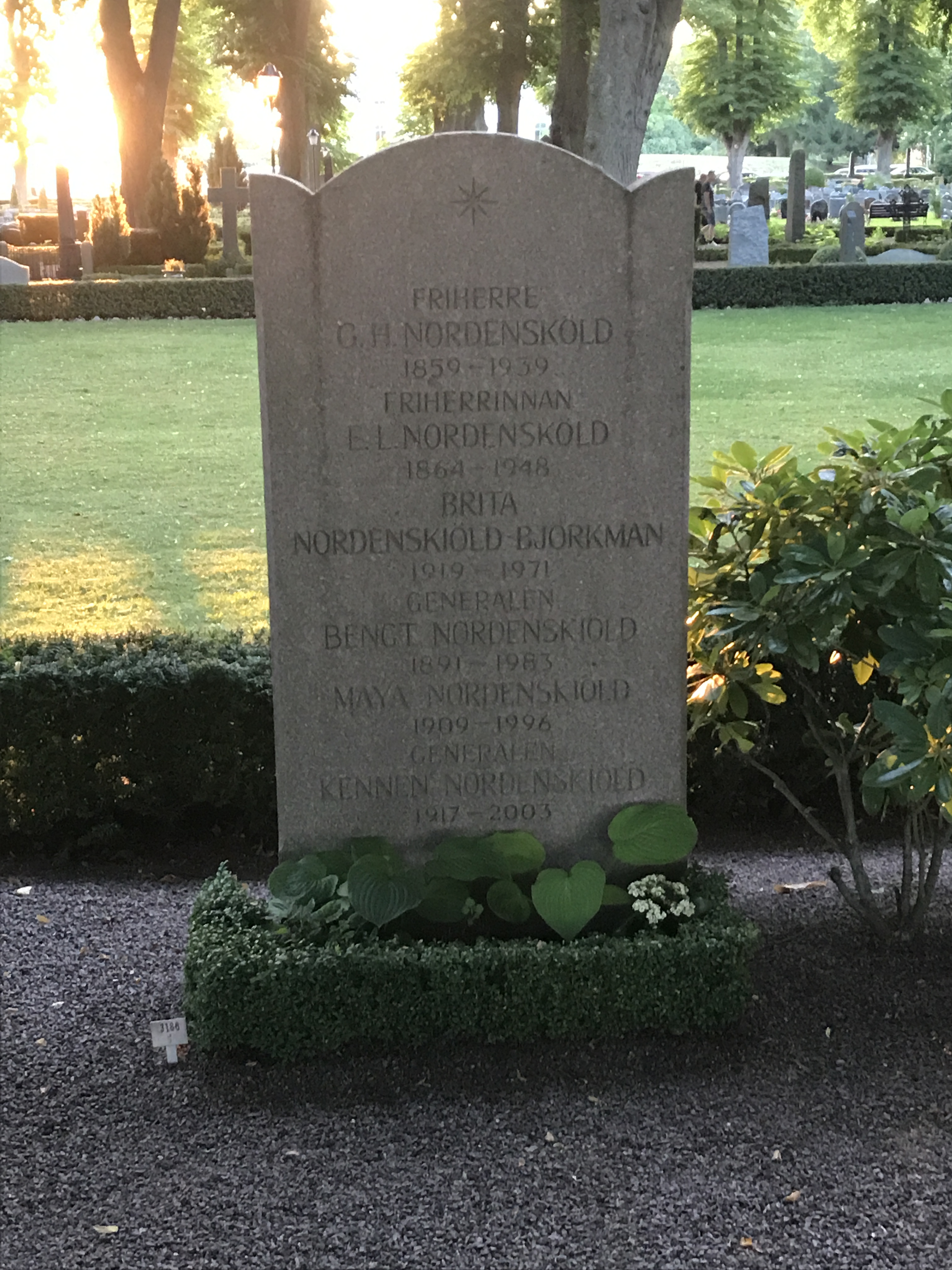
Gravesite of General Bengt Nordenskiöld at the Southern Cemetery (Södra kyrkogården) in Kalmar.

Nordenskiöld died on 28 January 1983 in Österhaninge Parish in Haninge Municipality, Stockholm County. He was buried on 21 June 1983 in the Southern Cemetery next to Kalmar Castle accompanied by his parents and later his two children.

== Dates of rank ==
Nordenskiöld's dates of rank:

Rank	Date
Volunteer	11 June 1910
Underlöjtnant	31 December 1912
Lieutenant	28 November 1916
Captain	9 December 1927
Major	27 April 1934
Lieutenant Colonel	1 July 1936
Major General	6 June 1941
Lieutenant General	1 July 1942
General	30 April 1954

== Awards and decorations ==
=== Swedish ===
- (Sweden) King Gustaf V's Jubilee Commemorative Medal (1948)
- (Sweden) Commander Grand Cross of the Order of the Sword (5 June 1943)
- (Sweden) Commander 1st Class of the Order of the Sword (15 November 1941)
- (Sweden) Commander of the Order of the Sword (15 November 1940)
- (Sweden) Knight of the Order of the Sword (16 June 1933)
- (Sweden) Knight of the Order of the Polar Star (15 November 1938)
- (Sweden) Knight of the Order of Vasa (30 June 1936)
- (Sweden) ? (SLGM)
- (Sweden) Royal Swedish Aero Club's medal of merit in gold (Kungliga Svenska Aeroklubbens förtjänstguldmedalj)
- (Sweden) ? (SvARHt)

=== Foreign ===
- (Denmark) Grand Cross of the Order of the Dannebrog
- (Ethiopian Empire) Grand Cross of the Order of Menelik II
- (Netherlands) Grand Cross of the Order of Orange-Nassau with swords
- (Norway) Grand Cross of the Order of St. Olav
- (Norway) Knight 2nd Class of the Order of St. Olav (1926)
- (Finland) 1st Class of the Order of the Cross of Liberty
- (France) Grand Officer of the Legion of Honour
- Grand Officer of the Order of the Crown of Italy
- (United Kingdom) Commander 1st Class of the Order of the British Empire
- (United States) Commander of the Legion of Merit (9 July 1946)
- Commander of the Order of the White Rose of Finland
- 1st Class Knight of the Order of the White Rose of Finland (1919)
- (Italy) Commander of the Order of Saints Maurice and Lazarus
- (Nazi Germany) 1st Class of the Order of the German Eagle
- (Spain) Knight 1st Class of the Crosses of Military Merit, with White Decoration (1926)
- (France) Knight of the Order of the Black Star (1926)
- (Poland) Cross of Merit (1928)
- (Denmark) Danish Medal of Freedom (Dansk Frihetsmedalj)

== Honours ==
- Member of the Royal Swedish Academy of War Sciences (1936; president 1948–1949)
- Honorary member of the Royal Swedish Society of Naval Sciences (1954)

Military offices
Preceded by None	Chief of the Air Staff; 1936–1942	Succeeded by Axel Ljungdahl
Preceded by None	Royal Swedish Air Force Staff College; 1939–1941	Succeeded by John Stenbeck
Preceded by None	Commander, Air Command; 1939–1942	Succeeded by Paulus af Uhr
Preceded by Torsten Friis	Chief of the Air Force; 1942–1954	Succeeded by Axel Ljungdahl
Professional and academic associations
Preceded by Archibald Douglas	President of the Royal Swedish Academy of War Sciences; 1948–1949	Succeeded by Helge Strömbäck
