= Hälsinge Wing =

Coordinates: 61.2744°N 17.0933°E

- Hälsinge flygflottilj
- Active: 1945–1998
- Country: Sweden
- Allegiance: Swedish Armed Forces
- Branch: Swedish Air Force
- Type: Wing
- Role: Fighter wing (1945–1961); Attack wing (1962–1993); Attack/Recon wing (1993–1998)
- Part of: 3rd Air Command (1945–1948); 2nd Air Command (1948–1961); 1st Air Command (1961–1966); Milo Ö (1966–1982); Milo NN (1982–1993); Milo M (1993–1998)
- Garrison/HQ: Söderhamn/Sandarne
- March: "When the Saints" (Lidberg) (Note: The march was adopted and established on 15 August 1967.)

Insignia
- Roundels

Aircraft flown
- Attack: A 32A, AJ 37,
- Bomber: B 5, B 17
- Fighter: J 21A, J 28B, J 29
- Multirole helicopter: Hkp 3, Hkp 4, Hkp 10
- Trainer: Sk 12, Sk 14, Sk 15, Sk 16, Sk 50, Sk 60 Sk 61, Sk 37
- Transport: Tp 83
- J 32B, AJS 37, AJSF 37, AJSH 37

Hälsinge Wing (Swedish: Hälsinge flygflottilj), also F 15 Söderhamn, or simply F 15, is a former Swedish Air Force wing with the main base located near Söderhamn in northern Sweden.

== Heraldry and traditions ==
=== Coat of arms ===
The first coat of arms of the Hälsinge Wing was used from 1945 to 1994. Blazon: "Sable, the provincial badge of Hälsingland, a buck rampant or, armed and langued gules." The second coat of arms was used from 1994 to 1997. Blazon: "Sable, the provincial badge of Hälsingland, a buck rampant or, armed and langued gules, a chief azure over a barrulet or, charged with a winged twobladed propeller of the last colour."

Coat of arms used from 1945 to 1994.

Coat of arms used from 1994 to 1997.

=== Colours, standards and guidons ===
A colour was presented to the wing in Söderhamn in March 1949 by the Chief of the Air Force, Lieutenant General Bengt Nordenskiöld. Blazon: "On blue cloth in the centre the badge of the Air Force; a winged two-bladed propeller under a royal crown proper, all yellow. In the first corner the provincial badge of Hälsingland; a yellow buck rampant, armed and langued red."

=== March ===
"Hälsinge flygflottiljs marsch" by Jörgen Lidberg. It's a march arrangement of "When the Saints Go Marching In". The march was established on 15 August 1967.

== Commanding officers ==
Commanding officers from 1945 to 1997. The commanding officer was referred to as "wing commander" and had the rank of colonel.

- 1945–1960: Gösta Seth
- 1960–1965: Olof Knutsson
- 1965–1972: Sven Lampell
- 1972–1975: Ingvar Hedin
- 1975–1978: Gunnar Unell
- 1978–1981: Åke Sjögren
- 1981–1987: Roland Magndahl
- 1987–1994: Sven Borgvald
- 1994–1997: Christer Hjort
- 1998–1998: Sture Gafvelin (acting)

== Names, designations and locations ==
Name	Translation	From		To
Kungl. Hälsinge flygflottilj	Royal Hälsinge Wing	1945-07-01	–	1974-12-31
Hälsinge flygflottilj	Hälsinge Wing; Hälsinge Air Group	1975-01-01	–	1998-06-30
Designation		From		To
F 15		1945-07-01	–	1998-06-30
Location		From		To
Söderhamn Airport		1948-??-??	–	1998-06-30

== See also ==
- Swedish Air Force
- List of military aircraft of Sweden
