= Carl Cederström =

Swedish aviator (1867–1918)

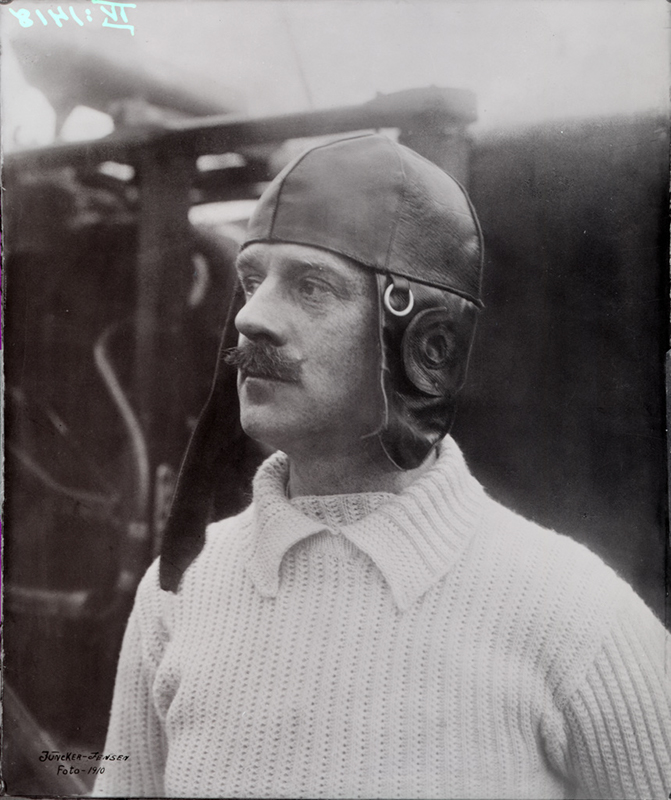
- Carl Cederström in 1910
- Born: Carl Gustav Alexander Cederström; 5 March 1867; Södertälje, Sweden
- Died: 29 June 1918 (aged 51); Gulf of Bothnia
- Occupation: Aviator
- Spouses: Marika Stiernstedt (m. 1900–1906) Minna Poppius (m. 1909–1918)
- Parent(s): Maria Cecilia Wennerström; Anders Cederström

Friherre Carl Gustav Alexander Cederström (5 March 1867 – 29 June 1918) was a pioneering Swedish aviator, known as "the flying Baron".

== Biography ==
He was born on 5 March 1867 to the Baron Anders Cederström and the Baroness Maria Cecilia Wennerström in Södertälje, Sweden, and he was baptized in Stockholm.

Cederström completed the program at the Blériot flying school in 1910. He became the 74th pilot in the world and the first to receive a certificate in Sweden. The next person in Sweden to qualify was Henrik David Hamilton. Cederström began teaching others to fly himself in 1912, opening a flying school near Linköping.

Cederström died on 29 June 1918 with Carl Gustaf Krokstedt when their plane crashed in the Gulf of Bothnia.
