= Royal Swedish Aero Club =

Swedish organisation of flying clubs

Royal Swedish Aero Club (Swedish: Kungliga Svenska Aeroklubben, KSAK, previously Svenska Aeronautiska Sällskapet, SAS), established in 1900, is today the national organization for Sweden's over 150 flying clubs and has been authorized by the Swedish Transport Agency administer ultralight aviation in Sweden. The Royal Swedish Aero Club has a wholly owned service company, located at Bromma Airport, which sells aeronautical maps and other aviation accessories.

== History ==
When the Swedish Aeronautical Society (Svenska Aeronautiska Sällskapet, SAS) was established in Stockholm on 15 December 1900, there were only one predecessor in the world, the Aéro-Club de France. The purpose of the society was "to its ability encourage the art of ballooning in Sweden in all its branches", and the first years until about 1910 were mostly about aerostats (balloons). It later turned to aerodynes (aircraft).

At the society's initiatives a large number of balloon flights were conducted during the first decade of the 1900s. During the early years, a time record was set by Karl Amundson in 1903 at 26 hours from Stockholm, Sweden, to Randers, Denmark, and a length record was set by Erik Unge in 1902 when he flew 730 km from Stockholm to Lake Ilmen, Russia; both with the balloon Svenske (Swede). The observation results from some of the society's expeditions were compiled by the Royal Swedish Academy of Sciences in its documents and were published in German.

After 1910 the society's interest was dedicated almost entirely to aircraft rather than on balloons. From 1910–1912 "fly weeks" were organized in Stockholm, as well as competitions and air shows around the country, where especially Baron Carl Cederström's ("The Flying Baron") shows attracted great interest. Through the society's activities, the first ever aircraft in Sweden was built, and this was donated to the state. In the spring of 1915 an exposition in Stockholm was organized, which highlighted the domestic aircraft manufacturing's position and wishes for its future development. World War I meant greatly increased interest in military aviation, but the society also worked during this era to establish civilian aviation operations. Among other things, the society worked to bring about airports at various locations in Sweden and thus create conditions for scheduled air services.

Oscar II of Sweden was the society's guardian, and in December 1910 the Crown Prince of Sweden succeeded him. In connection with the 20th anniversary in 1920 the name was changed to the current Kungliga Svenska Aeroklubben (KSAK). King Carl XVI Gustaf became in autumn 1974 the organization's guardian after his grandfather's death.

== Secretaries general ==
- 1937–1939: Carl Petersén
- 1939–1941: ?
- 1941–1941: Harald Enell
- 1941–1954: ?
- 1954–1964: Nils Söderberg
- 1965–1969: Björn Lindskog
- 1970–1972: Kjell Rasmusson
- 1972–1976: Tore Lundberg
- 1976–1981: Wilhelm Wagner
- 1981–1989: Sven Hugosson
- 1989–1996: Sven Kamsén
- 1996–1998: Carl-Johan Rundberg
- 1998–2017: Rolf Björkman
- 2017–present: Lars-Christer Andersson
