= Central Air Command (Sweden) =

- Mellersta flygkommandot
- Active: 1994–2000
- Country: Sweden
- Allegiance: Swedish Armed Forces
- Branch: Swedish Air Force
- Type: Air command
- Role: STRIL
- Garrison/HQ: Bålsta
- March: "Den svenske flygsoldaten" (Per Berg) (Note: The unit march was adopted in 1994 and was established on 13 June 1996.)

Aircraft flown
- Attack: Sk 60C
- Electronic warfare: J 32E
- Fighter: JA 37
- J 32D (target aircraft)

The Central Air Command (Swedish: Mellersta flygkommandot, FKM) was an air command within the Swedish Air Force that operated from 1994 to 2000. The unit was based in Bålsta in Uppsala Garrison. It was responsible for air surveillance over Central Sweden.

== History ==
The Central Air Command was an air command within the Swedish Air Force with an area of responsibility for air surveillance within the Middle Military District (Milo M). The history of the Central Air Command goes back to 1957, when the concept of air defence sector was established, which were added by assigning responsibility to ten wings over eleven air defence sectors. In 1981, the number of sectors was reduced to four where Uppland Wing (F 16) became a large sector wing, with the designation F 16/Se M, and was responsible for air surveillance over Central Sweden.

In connection with the Defence Act of 1992, it was decided that the four air defence sector units would be disbanded, and instead reorganized into regular wings. In its place, responsibility for the air defence sectors would be assigned to three newly established air commands.

On 1 July 1993, three new regional command organizations were formed – for northern, central, and southern Sweden. With it, the air defence sector staff at F 16 was reorganized and formed the embryo of the Central Air Command. Initially, the staff was integrated into F 16, which was designated F 16/FKM. On 1 July 1994, the staff was separated from the wing, and at the same time became a cadre-organized war unit within the Middle Military District (Milo M).

In the years 1993–1995, tasks from 1st Air Command (E 1) were also transferred to the three air commands. This was because the Defence Act of 1992 also included that the 1st Air Command was to be disbanded.

Prior to the Defence Act of 2000, the Swedish government proposed in its bill for the Riksdag that the tactical level should be reduced by disbanding division and military district staffs as well as naval commands and air commands. This was to design an Army Command, Navy Command and Air Force Command which would be co-located with the Joint Operations Command (Operationsledningen, OPL). The proposal meant that all territorial staffs would be disbanded, which meant, among other things, that the three air command staffs were disbanded on 30 June 2000.

In its place, the Air Force Command was formed on 1 July 2000, which geographically encompassed the three former air commands.

== Units ==
From 1 July 1994, the following combat and ground aviation units were part of the Central Air Command:

- Uppland Wing
  - 162nd Fighter Division (JA 37 Viggen)
  - 163rd Fighter Division (JA 37 Viggen)
  - 165th Light Attack Division (Sk 60C)
  - Målflygdivisionen (J 32D/J 32E)
- Flygvapnets Uppsalaskolor
  - Flygvapnets flygbefälsskola
  - Swedish Air Force Staff College (Flygvapnets krigshögskola)
  - Flygvapnets underrättelseskola
  - Swedish Air Force Tactical and Air Defence Control School (Flygvapnets stridslednings- och luftbevakningsskola)
- Tactical Command Center – Puman

== Aircraft ==
The aircraft that were part of the air command formally belonged to the wings involved.

Fighter aircraft

- 1994–2000: JA 37

Attack aircraft

- 1994–1996: Sk 60C

Electronic-warfare aircraft and target aircraft

- 1994–1997: J 32D
- 1994–1997: J 32E

== Heraldry and traditions ==
=== Coat of arms ===
The coat of the arms of the Central Air Command (FKM) from 1994 to 2000. Blazon: "Or, the coat of arms of Stockholm, the crowned head of Saint Eric couped azure, a chief azure charged with a winged twinbladed propeller or. The shield surmounting an erect sword or."

Coat of arms of the Central Air Command (FKM) from 1994 to 2000.

=== March ===
The march of the Central Air Command, "Den svenske flygsoldaten", was composed by music director Per Berg.

=== Traditions ===
The traditions of the Central Air Command are today continued by the Swedish Air Combat Training School (Luftstridsskolan) in Uppsala.

== Commanding officers ==
Commanding officers and chiefs of the staff: The commander was subordinate to the military commander of Middle Military District.

=== Commanders ===
- 1994–1995: Senior Colonel Stig Dellborg
- 1995–1997: Senior Colonel Kjell Koserius
- 1997–1998: Senior Colonel Bo Waldemarsson
- 1998–2000: Senior Colonel Ulf Sveding

=== Chiefs of staff ===
- 1994–1995: Colonel Robert Palmgren
- 1995–1997: Colonel Bo Waldemarsson
- 1997–2000: Colonel Nils Ullgren

== Names, designations and locations ==
| Name | Translation | From | | To |
|---|---|---|---|---|
| Mellersta flygkommandot | Central Air Command | 1994-07-01 | – | 2000-06-30 |
| Designation | | From | | To |
| FKM | | 1994-07-01 | – | 2000-06-30 |
| Location | | From | | To |
| Uppsala Garrison/Bålsta | | 1994-07-01 | – | 2000-06-30 |
| Air bases | | From | | To |
| Tullinge Airport | | 1994-07-01 | – | ? |
| Ärna Airport | | 1994-07-01 | – | 2000-06-30 |
| Tierp Airbase | | 1994-07-01 | – | 2000-06-30 |
| Rommehed Airport | | 1994-07-01 | – | 2000-06-30 |
| Visby Airport | | 1994-07-01 | – | 2000-06-30 |
| Kjula Air Base | | 1994-07-01 | – | 2000-06-30 |
| Gimo Airbase | | 1994-07-01 | – | 2000-06-30 |
| Malmby Airbase | | 1994-07-01 | – | 2000-06-30 |
| Malmen Airbase | | 1994-07-01 | – | 2000-06-30 |
| Bråvalla Airport | | 1994-07-01 | – | 2000-06-30 |

== See also ==
- Northern Air Command
- Southern Air Command
