= Bo Waldemarsson =

Swedish Air Force officer

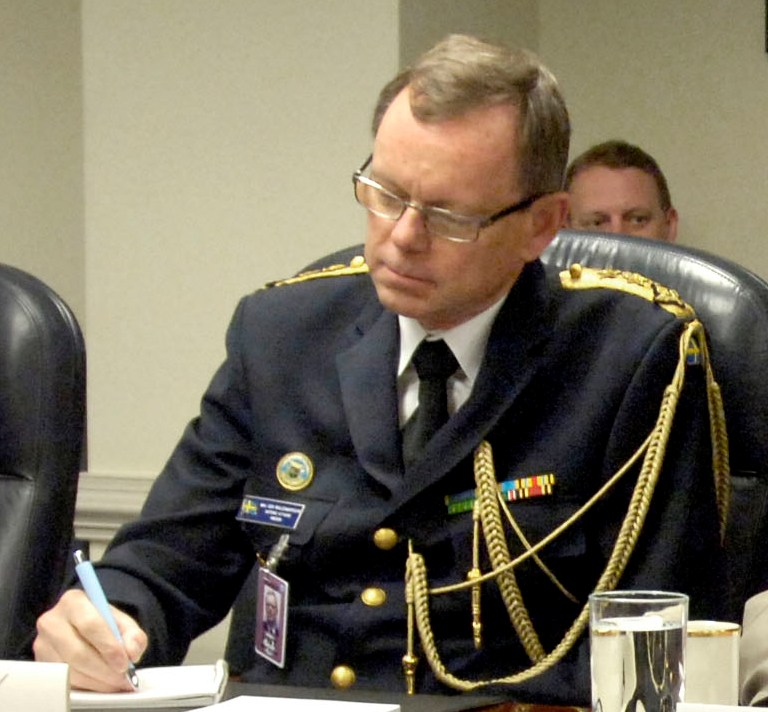
- Waldemarsson in 2007.
- Born: Bo Erik Siwer Waldemarsson; 28 November 1949 (age 76); Billinge, Sweden
- Military career
- Allegiance: Sweden
- Branch: Swedish Air Force
- Service years: 1973–2010
- Rank: Major General
- Commands: Central Air Command; Central Military District; Commandant General in Stockholm

Major General Bo Erik Siwer Waldemarsson (born 28 November 1949) is a retired officer of the Swedish Air Force. His senior commands include commanding officer of the Central Air Command and the Central Military District. Waldemarsson also served as the Commandant General in Stockholm for two years.

== Early life ==
Waldemarsson was born on 28 November 1949 in Billinge Parish, Malmöhus County, Sweden, the son of Waldemar Waldemarsson and his wife Ewy (née Olin). He passed studentexamen in 1968.

== Career ==
Waldemarsson was commissioned as an officer after graduating from the Royal Swedish Air Force Academy (Flygvapnets krigsskola, F 20) in 1973 and he was appointed lieutenant the same year at the Kalmar Wing, where he served from 1973 to 1976. In 1976, he was promoted to captain and served from 1976 to 1982 at the Blekinge Wing, where he was Radar Intercept Controller from 1976 to 1979 and company commander from 1980 to 1982. Waldemarsson attended the General Course at the Swedish Armed Forces Staff College from 1978 to 1979 and the Senior Course from 1982 to 1984. He was promoted to major in 1983 and then served as head of the Education Department in the Air Staff from 1984 to 1985. Waldemarsson served as head of the Planning Department in the Defence Staff from 1985 to 1986 and was combat control commander at the Blekinge Wing from 1986 to 1989. He was promoted to lieutenant colonel in 1987 and then served again in the Planning Department in the Defence Staff from 1989 to 1990. Waldemarsson was appointed with lieutenant colonel with special position (Överstelöjtnant med särskild tjänsteställning) and was Director, Short Term Planning Department from 1991 to 1994. He attended the Higher Operational Management Course at the Swedish Armed Forces Staff College in 1993.

Waldemarsson was promoted to colonel in 1994 and was educated at the Air War College in Alabama, United States from 1994 to 1995. He served as Chief of Staff of the Central Air Command from 1995 to 1996 and attended the Main Course and Management Course at the Swedish National Defence College in 1996 and in 1997. In 1997, Waldemarsson was promoted to senior colonel and then he served as commanding officer of the Central Air Command from 1997 to 1998. He was promoted to major general in 1998 and was head of the Planning Staff at the Swedish Armed Forces Headquarters from 1 July 1998 to 2000. In 1999, he attended the Senior International Defence Management Course at the Naval Postgraduate School in Monterey, California. Waldemarsson was military advisor in the Swedish Parliamentary Defence Commission (Försvarsberedningen) from 1999 to 2000. He was deputy director-general (departementsråd) and deputy head of the Security Policy and International Affairs Unit at the Ministry of Defence from 2000 to 2002. On 1 January 2003, Waldemarsson assumed the position of commanding officer of the Central Military District. He served in this position until 2005. He was then military attaché at the Embassy of Sweden, Washington, D.C. from 2005 to 2008. After that he was an adviser on export issues regarding aircraft equipment at the Ministry of Defence from 2008 to 2010. Waldemarsson retired from the Swedish Armed Forces in 2010.

== Personal life ==
In 1981, Waldemarsson married Gerd Olsson (born 1952), the daughter of Malte Olsson and Anna-Lisa (née Svensson).

== Dates of rank ==
- 1973 – Lieutenant
- 1976 – Captain
- 1983 – Major
- 1987 – Lieutenant colonel
- 1991 – Överstelöjtnant med särskild tjänsteställning
- 1994 – Colonel
- 1997 – Senior colonel
- 1998 – Major general

== Awards and decorations ==
=== Swedish ===
- (Sweden) For Zealous and Devoted Service of the Realm
- (Sweden) Swedish Armed Forces Conscript Medal
- (Sweden) Royal Swedish Academy of War Sciences's Reward Medal in Gold, 8th size (2017)
- (Sweden) Central Military District Medal of Merit
- (Sweden) Association of Home Guard Officers Merit Badge

=== Foreign ===
- Knight Commander's Cross of the Order of Merit of the Federal Republic of Germany
- (United States) Officer of the Legion of Merit

== Honours ==
- Member of the Royal Swedish Academy of War Sciences (1997)
- Chairman, Air Warfare Department, Royal Swedish Academy of War Sciences (2012–2014)
- Vice President of the Royal Swedish Academy of War Sciences (2014–2017)
- Senior Fellow of the New Westminster College (2013)

Military offices
| Preceded by Kjell Koserius | Central Air Command; 1997–1998 | Succeeded by Ulf Sveding |
| Preceded by Curt Westberg | Central Military District; 2003–2005 | Succeeded by Bengt Degerman |
| Preceded by Curt Westberg | Commandant General in Stockholm; 2003–2005 | Succeeded by Jan Jonsson |
