= Kjell Koserius =

Swedish Air Force officer

- Born: Kjell Bertil Ingvar Koserius; 26 October 1943; Kinna, Sweden
- Died: 4 December 2002 (aged 59); Enköping, Sweden
- Burial place: Enköpings-Näs Cemetery
- Military career
- Allegiance: Sweden
- Branch: Swedish Air Force
- Service years: 1962–2002
- Rank: Major General
- Commands: Central Air Command; Chief of Staff, Middle Military District; Middle Military District; Central Military District; Commandant General in Stockholm; NNSC

Major General Kjell Bertil Ingvar Koserius (26 October 1943 – 4 December 2002) was a Swedish Air Force officer.

== Early life ==
Koserius was born on 26 October 1943 in Kinna Parish, Älvsborg County, Sweden.

== Career ==
Koserius graduated from the Swedish Air Force Flying School in 1962 and was commissioned as an officer with the rank of second lieutenant. He was promoted to lieutenant in 1964. On 21 June 1978, Koserius graduated from Flygvapnets Krigsskola (F 20) in Uppsala, and was awarded commanding officer of F 20's silver plaque and the Swedish Association of Army, Navy and Air Force Officers's (Svenska officersförbundet) book prize for good study achievements. He completed the Higher Course at the Swedish Armed Forces Staff College from 1981 to 1983 and was promoted to major in 1983. Koserius served in the Defence Staff and in the Air Staff from 1983 to 1985. He was head of Section 1 at Uppland Wing from 1986 to 1988, and was promoted to lieutenant colonel in 1987 and served in the Air Staff from 1988.

Koserius was promoted to colonel on 15 May 1991. He was at the time maintaining a long-term substitute as head of the unit for human resource management (C FS/Persl) in the Air Staff. On 1 April 1992, Koserius was appointed permanent head of the same unit in the Air Staff and on 1 July the same year, he was promoted to senior colonel. He was succeeded by colonel Nils Ullgren on 1 January 1993 when Koserius was posted to staff of the Middle Military District (Milo M) as chief of the Operations Command.

On 1 October 1995, Koserius took command of the Central Air Command, a position he held until 1996. He was promoted to major general in 1997 and served as chief of staff of the Middle Military District from 1997 to 2000 when he was appointed commanding officer of the newly formed Central Military District in Strängnäs. Koserius was at the same time Commandant General in Stockholm. Koserius served in these positions until 30 June 2001. From 27 June 2001 to 11 June 2002, Koserius served as head of the Swedish Delegation to the Neutral Nations Supervisory Commission (NNSC).

== Death ==
Koserius died on 4 December 2002 in Enköpings-Näs Parish, Uppsala County. He was buried on 23 May 2003 in Enköpings-Näs Cemetery.

== Dates of rank ==
- 1962 – Second lieutenant
- 1964 – Lieutenant
- 19?? – Captain
- 1983 – Major
- 1987 – Lieutenant colonel
- 15 May 1991 – Colonel
- 1 July 1992 – Senior colonel
- 1997 – Major general

Military offices
Preceded by Stig Dellborg	Central Air Command; 1995–1996	Succeeded by Bo Waldemarsson
Preceded by Anders Lindström	Chief of Staff of Middle Military District; 1997–2000	Succeeded by None
Preceded by Percurt Green	Middle Military District; 2000–2000	Succeeded by None
Preceded by None	Central Military District; 2000–2001	Succeeded by Bo Waldemarsson
Preceded by Percurt Green	Commandant General in Stockholm; 2000–2001	Succeeded by Curt Westberg
Preceded by Peter Hammarström	Head of Swedish Delegation to NNSC; 27 June 2001 – 11 June 2002	Succeeded by Björn Elmer
