= Southern Air Command (Sweden) =

- Södra flygkommandot
- Active: 1994–2000
- Country: Sweden
- Allegiance: Swedish Armed Forces
- Branch: Swedish Air Force
- Type: Air command
- Role: STRIL
- Garrison/HQ: Ängelholm
- March: "Flygkadetten" (Melin/Persson) (Note: The unit march was adopted in 1994 and was established on 13 June 1996.)

Aircraft flown
- Attack: AJ 37
- Fighter: JA 37
- Multirole helicopter: AJS 37, AJSF 37, AJSH 37, JAS 39A/B
- Reconnaissance: SF 37, SH 37
- Trainer: Sk 35, Sk 60A/B/C
- Transport: TP 84

The Southern Air Command (Swedish: Södra flygkommandot, FKS) was an air command within the Swedish Air Force that operated from 1994 to 2000. The unit was based in Ängelholm. It was responsible for air surveillance over South Sweden.

== History ==
The Southern Air Command was an air command within the Swedish Air Force with an area of responsibility for air surveillance within the Southern Military District (Milo S). The history of the Southern Air Command goes back to 1957, when the concept of air defence sector was established, which were added by assigning responsibility to ten wings over eleven air defence sectors. In 1981, the number of sectors was reduced to four where Scania Wing (F 10) became a large sector wing, with the designation F 10/Se S, and was responsible for air surveillance over South Sweden.

In connection with the Defence Act of 1992, it was decided that the four air defence sector units would be disbanded, and instead reorganized into regular wings. In its place, responsibility for the air defence sectors would be assigned to three newly established air commands.

On 1 July 1993, three new regional command organizations were formed – for northern, central, and southern Sweden. With it, the air defence sector staff at F 4 was disbanded and staff at F 21 was reorganized and formed the embryo of the Southern Air Command. Initially, the staff was integrated into F 10, which was designated F 10/FKS. On 1 July 1994, the staff was separated from the wing, and at the same time became a cadre-organized war unit within the Southern Military District (Milo S).

In the years 1993–1995, tasks from 1st Air Command (E 1) were also transferred to the three air commands. This was because the Defence Act of 1992 also included that the 1st Air Command was to be disbanded.

Prior to the Defence Act of 2000, the Swedish government proposed in its bill for the Riksdag that the tactical level should be reduced by disbanding division and military district staffs as well as naval commands and air commands. This was to design an Army Command, Navy Command and Air Force Command which would be co-located with the Joint Operations Command (Operationsledningen, OPL). The proposal meant that all territorial staffs would be disbanded, which meant, among other things, that the three air command staffs were disbanded on 30 June 2000.

In its place, the Air Force Command was formed on 1 July 2000, which geographically encompassed the three former air commands.

== Units ==
From 1 July 1994, the following combat and ground aviation units were part of the Southern Air Command.

- Flygvapnets Halmstadsskolor
  - Flygvapnets basbefälsskola
  - Flygvapnets sambands- och stabstjänstskola
  - Swedish Air Force Technical School (Flygvapnets tekniska skola)
  - Swedish Air Force Officer's School (Flygvapnets officershögskola)
  - Swedish Air Force Ground Telecommunications School (Flygvapnets markteletekniska skola)
- Swedish Air Force Flying School
  - 51st Attack Division (Sk 60)
  - 52nd Attack Division (Sk 60)
  - 53rd Attack Division (Sk 60)
  - 55th Attack Division (Sk 60)
- Skaraborg Wing
  - 71st Attack Division (AJ 37 Viggen, JAS 39 Gripen)
  - 72nd Attack Division (AJ 37 Viggen, JAS 39 Gripen)
- Scania Wing
  - 101st Reconnaissance Division (AJS 37, AJSF 37, AJSH 37 Viggen)
  - 102nd Fighter Division (J 35J Draken)
  - 103rd Fighter Division (J 35J Draken)
- Blekinge Wing
  - 171st Fighter Division (JA 37 Viggen)
  - 172nd Fighter Division (JA 37 Viggen)
  - 173rd Helicopter Division (JA 37 Viggen)

== Aircraft ==
Fighter aircraft

- 1994–2000: JA 37

Attack aircraft

- 1994–1995: AJ 37

Trainer aircraft

- 1994–1997: Sk 35C
- 1994–2000: Sk 60

Multirole combat aircraft

- 1995–2000: AJS 37
- 1995–2000: AJSF 37
- 1995–2000: AJSH 37
- 1996–2000: JAS 39

== Heraldry and traditions ==
=== Coat of arms ===
The coat of the arms of the Southern Air Command (FKS) from 1994 to 2000. Blazon: "With waves six times divided bends sinister azure and argent, charged with a double tailed crowned lion rampant or, armed and langued gules, a chief azure charged with a winged twinbladed propeller over a string, all or. The shield surmounting an erect sword or.

Coat of arms of the Southern Air Command (FKS) from 1994 to 2000.

=== March ===
The march of the Southern Air Command, "Flygkadetten", was composed by the music director Kurt Melin and the leader of the Färe music choir in Sibbhult Sture Persson.

=== Traditions ===
The traditions of the Southern Air Command are today continued by the Blekinge Wing in Ronneby.

== Commanding officers ==
The commander was subordinate to the military commander of Southern Military District.

=== Commanders ===
- 1994–1995: Senior Colonel Mats Hugosson
- 1995–1997: Senior Colonel Arne Hansson
- 1997–1998: Senior Colonel Jan Jonsson
- 1998–2000: Senior Colonel Robert Palmgren

=== Chiefs of staff ===
- 1995–1997: Colonel Christer Salsing
- 1997–2000: Colonel Lars Lundell

== Names, designations and locations ==
Name	Translation	From		To
Norra flygkommandot	Southern Air Command	1994-07-01	–	2000-06-30
Designation		From		To
FKS		1994-07-01	–	2000-06-30
Location		From		To
Ängelholm Garrison		1994-07-01	–	2000-06-30
Air bases		From		To
Såtenäs Airport		1994-07-01	–	2000-06-30
Ronneby Airport		1994-07-01	–	2000-06-30
Halmstad Airport		1994-07-01	–	2000-06-30
Ljungbyhed Airport		1994-07-01	–	2000-06-30
Björka Air Base		1994-07-01	–	2000-06-30
Byholma Air Base		1994-07-01	–	2000-06-30
Eneryda Air Base		1994-07-01	–	2000-06-30
Knislinge Air Base		1994-07-01	–	2000-06-30
Hovby Air Base		1994-07-01	–	2000-06-30
Moholm Air Base		1994-07-01	–	2000-06-30
Säve Air Base		1994-07-01	–	2000-06-30

== See also ==
- Central Air Command
- Northern Air Command
