= EKT =

EKT may refer to:

== Music ==
- EKT Gdynia, a Polish shanty band
- "Everyone Knows That", a 1986 song by Christopher and Philip Booth

== Organisations ==
- Epsilon Kappa Theta, a sorority at Dartmouth College, New Hampshire, US
- European Central Bank (Greek: Ευρωπαϊκή Κεντρική Τράπεζα)
- National Documentation Centre (Greece), a public research archive (Greek: Εθνικό Κέντρο Τεκμηρίωσης)

== Transport ==
- Eskilstuna Airport, Sweden (IATA:EKT)
