= Curt Westberg =

Swedish Air Force officer

- Born: 14 September 1943 (age 83); Mörsil, Sweden
- Military career
- Allegiance: Sweden
- Branch: Swedish Air Force
- Service years: 1970–2003
- Rank: Major General
- Commands: Norrbotten Wing; Gotland Military District; Central Military District; Commandant General in Stockholm

Major General Curt Westberg (born 14 September 1943) is a retired Swedish Air Force officer. His senior commands include commanding officer of the Gotland Military District, Central Military District as well as Commandant General in Stockholm.

== Career ==
Westberg was commissioned as an officer in the Swedish Air Force in 1970 with the rank of second lieutenant after graduating from the Swedish Air Force Flying Training School (Flygvapnets flygskola). He was promoted to lieutenant in 1972, to captain in 1975 and to major in 1983. Until 1983 he served most of the time at Norrbotten Wing (F 21), where he, among other things, served as squadron commander and flight commander. He flew AJ 37 Viggen (attack and light attack) and later in the 1990s, JA 37 Viggen (interceptor). He was promoted to lieutenant colonel in 1985 and then served as deputy commander of Norrbotten Wing from 1 October 1991. He was promoted to colonel on 1 April 1992.

Westberg served as wing commander of Norrbotten Wing from 1993 to 1994. He then served as deputy commander of the Northern Air Command in Luleå in 1994 and was promoted to colonel the same year, and to senior colonel in 1995. On 1 October 1995, Westberg took command of the Production Department (Produktionsavdelningen) in the Air Force Command (C FVL PROD). There he was responsible for combat unit production, which included the development of both the war organization and the peace organization. Westberg was at the same time acting chief of the Air Force Command.

On 1 April 1997, Westberg was promoted to major general and appointed chief of the Joint Staff (Gemensamma staben, Gems) in the Swedish Armed Forces Headquarters. He then served at the disposal of the Supreme Commander from 1998 to 1999. In 2000, Westberg was appointed commanding officer of Gotland Military District. On 1 July 2001, Westberg took command as commanding officer of the Central Military District. He took office the same year as Commandant General in Stockholm. Westberg retired in 2003.

Westberg has also been chairman of the Swedish Armed Forces Personnel Responsibility Committee (Försvarsmaktens personalansvarsnämnd) and an expert in the Utredningen om Försvarsmaktens skolverksamhet ("The Investigation of the Swedish Armed Forces' School Activities").

== Personal life ==
He is married to Marianne (born 1943), with whom he has two children.

== Dates of rank ==
- 1970 – Second lieutenant
- 1972 – Lieutenant
- 1975 – Captain
- 1983 – Major
- 1985 – Lieutenant colonel
- 1 April 1992 – Colonel
- 1995 – Senior colonel
- 1 April 1997 – Major general

Military offices
Preceded by Kent Harrskog	Norrbotten Wing; 1993–1994	Succeeded by Roland Sterner
Preceded by Kjell Nilsson	Production Department in the Air Force Command; 1995–1997	Succeeded by Ulf Sveding
Preceded by Bernt Östh	Joint Staff (Gemensamma staben); 1997–2000	Succeeded by None
Preceded by None	Gotland Military District; 2000–2001	Succeeded by Bengt Jerkland
Preceded by Kjell Koserius	Central Military District; 2001–2003	Succeeded by Bo Waldemarsson
Preceded by Kjell Koserius	Commandant General in Stockholm; 2001–2003	Succeeded by Bo Waldemarsson
