= Central Air Command =

Central Air Command may refer to:

- Central Air Command (India), one of five operational commands of the Indian Air Force
- Central Air Command (Pakistan), one of five operational commands of the Pakistan Air Force
- Central Air Command (Sweden), one of three former air commands of the Swedish Air Force

== See also ==
- Central Command (disambiguation)
