= Gimo =

Gimo may refer to:

== Places ==
- Gimo, Sweden
  - Gimo Air Base

== People ==
- Guillermo C. de Vega (1931–1975), nicknamed Gimo, Philippine politician
- Chiang Kai-shek (1887–1975), nicknamed Gimo, Chinese politician and former leader of the Kuomintang
