= Central Military District (Sweden) =

Coordinates: 59°23.136′N 17°0.619′E

- Mellersta militärdistriktet
- Active: 2000–2005
- Country: Sweden
- Allegiance: Swedish Armed Forces
- Branch: Joint service
- Type: Military district
- Role: Operational, territorial and tactical operations
- Part of: Swedish Armed Forces Headquarters
- Garrison/HQ: Strängnäs
- Colors: Yellow, red and black
- March: "I parad" (Trobäck) (Note: The unit march was adopted in 2000 and was established on 27 November 2002.)

The Central Military District (Swedish: Mellersta militärdistriktet, MD M) was a military district within the Swedish Armed Forces from 2000 to 2005. Its staff was located in Strängnäs, Sweden. The military district included Stockholm, Uppsala, Södermanland, Östergötland, Värmland, Örebro, Västmanland, Dalarna and Gävleborg counties.

== History ==
Prior to the Defence Act of 2000, the Swedish government proposed that the tactical level should be reduced by disbanding divisional and defence district staffs as well as naval commands and air commands. This was to design an Army Command, Navy Command and Air Force Command, respectively, which would be co-located with the new Joint Forces Command (OPIL) at the Swedish Armed Forces Headquarters. The proposal meant that all territorial staffs would be disbanded, which meant, among other things, that the military district (militärområde) staffs were disbanded on 30 June 2000. Instead, on 1 July 2000, four new military districts (militärdistrict) were formed with ground territorial tasks, which in principle corresponded geographically to the former military districts. The big difference was that the military districts were the lowest level where the commander was territorially responsible. Through the Defence Act of 2000, the Middle Military District (Milo M) was disbanded and replaced to some extent by the Central Military District (MD M), which geographically corresponded to the former military district. Within the military district, military district groups (militärdistriktsgrupper) were organized according to the previous division of military district (militärområde), which within the Central Military District corresponded to ten military district groups.

Prior to the Defence Act of 2004, the government proposed to the Riksdag, following a proposal from the Swedish Armed Forces, to reduce the number of military district groups, where the military district groups in Kristinehamn and Västerås within the Central Military District were proposed to be disbanded. Then, according to the Swedish Armed Forces, fewer Home Guard units would be organized, but better trained and fulfilled units. The defence act meant that Västmanlandsgruppen and Värmlandsgruppen were disbanded on 30 June 2005, and its tasks were taken over on 1 July 2005 by Livregementets grenadjärgrupp and Upplandsgruppen, respectively. Furthermore, Gotland Military District, among other things, was disbanded, which meant that Gotlandsgruppen was transferred from 1 January 2005 to the Central Military District. Prior to the defence act, the Swedish Armed Forces had proposed three alternatives to a changed military district organization. The first course of action was to maintain the military district organization. The second course of action would be to unite the military district staffs with a training unit. The third course of action was to disband the military district organization, and to transfer responsibility for territorial operations to the Joint Forces Command (OPIL). That a change in the military district organization was necessary was shared by both the government, the Swedish Armed Forces and the Swedish Defence Commission (Försvarsberedningen). Both the government and the Defence Commission considered that the issue needed further consideration before a Riksdag decision was possible. The government's main alternative, however, was for the organization to be disbanded.

On 2 June 2005, the Swedish government presented its bill (2004/05:160) regarding the disbanding of the military district organization. In the bill, the government referred to the fact that "In the future operational defence and the decided operational organization, there are no longer requirements or needs for regional or territorial command that justify a special command organization". Thus, the government considered that the military district organization could be disbanded, something that the Swedish Armed Forces also proposed in a petition to the government on 7 March 2005. In its place, four Security and Cooperation Sections would be established, located in Boden, Stockholm, Gothenburg and Malmö.

On 16 November 2005, the Riksdag decided to disband the military district organization. The Central Military District Staff in Strängnäs, as well as the military district staffs in Gothenburg and Boden, would be disbanded on 31 December 2005. The Ledningsgrupp Stockholm, which was part of the Central Military District was also disbanded. The military district groups in the counties, which were responsible for training the Home Guard, was to be called training groups (utbildningsgrupper) from 31 December 2005 and the main leadership for these was intended to be transferred to different units at the same time. Within the Central Military District, a transfer of the groups to the Life Guards, Life Regiment Hussars, Uppland Regiment, 1st Marine Regiment 1 and the Swedish Armed Forces Helicopter Wing was planned. Until 21 December, the military districts had continued territorial responsibility with, among other things, responsibility for preparedness and support to society - after which this was handed over to the Swedish Armed Forces Headquarters/Chief of the Joint Forces Command (in Uppsala). The tasks of the military district staffs regarding collaboration with county administrative boards, municipalities, rescue services and other community bodies was proposed to be taken over by newly established so-called Security and Cooperation Sections in Malmö (Revingeby), Gothenburg, Stockholm and Boden. A smaller decommissioning force at the military district staff was established during the period 1 January-30 June 2006.

A decommissioning ceremony was held in the gym at Södermanland Regiment (P 10) on Monday 19 December at 11.30. The Royal Swedish Army Drum Corps was responsible for the music. The military district command flag was lowered and returned to the Supreme Commander of the Swedish Armed Forces's representative, the Chief of Operations, and then handed over to the Swedish Army Museum. The Central Military District in Strängnäs was disbanded on 31 December 2005. The military district groups was handed over at the ceremony on 19 December to the commanders of the Life Guards, the Life Regiment Hussars, the Uppland Regiment, the 1st Marine Regiment and the Swedish Armed Forces Helicopter Wing.

== Units ==
=== 2000–2004 ===
- Dalregementsgruppen, Falun
- Gävleborgsgruppen, Gävle
- Livgardesgruppen, Stockholm
- Livgrenadjärgruppen, Linköping
- Livregementets grenadjärgrupp, Örebro
- Södermanlandsgruppen, Strängnäs
- Södertörnsgruppen, Muskö
- Upplandsgruppen, Enköping
- Västmanlandsgruppen, Västerås
- Värmlandsgruppen, Kristinehamn

=== 2005–2005 ===
On 1 January 2005, the military district group in Visby was added. A new organization was adopted on 1 July 2005, when the military district groups in Karlstad and Västerås were disbanded on 30 June 2005.

- Dalregementsgruppen, Falun
- Gotlandsgruppen, Visby
- Gävleborgsgruppen, Gävle
- Livgardesgruppen, Stockholm
- Livgrenadjärgruppen, Linköping
- Örebro-Värmlandsgruppen, Örebro
- Södermanlandsgruppen, Strängnäs
- Södertörnsgruppen, Muskö
- Upplands- och Västmanlandsgruppen, Enköping

== Location ==
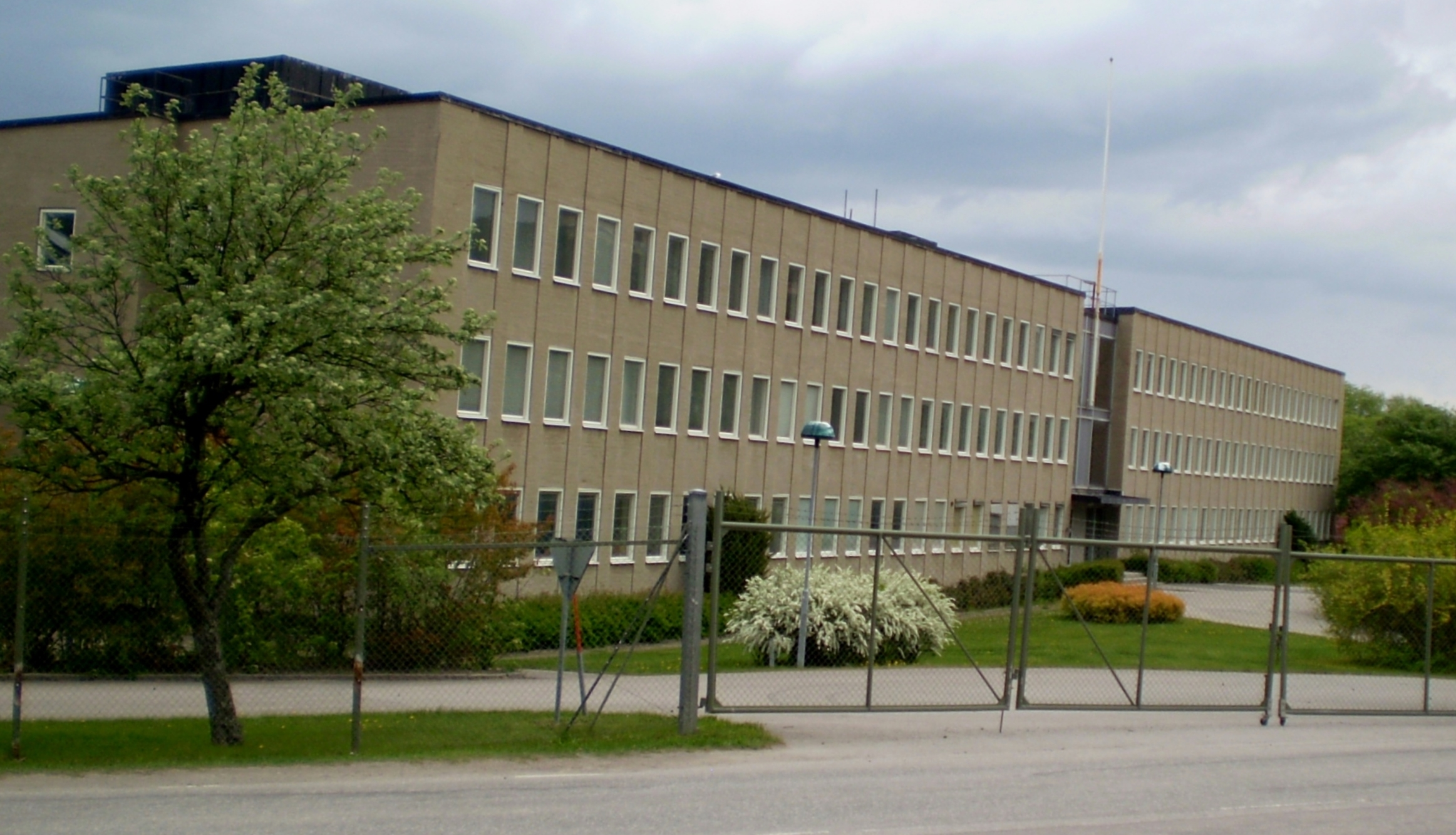
Building pictured in 2009.

The staff was located at Regementsgatan 48–50 in Strängnäs. In connection with the formation of the Central Military District on 1 July 2000, it took over the staff building erected in 1963 for the then Eastern Military District (Milo Ö) which were moved to Strängnäs on 12 June 1963. The staff building was erected directly adjacent to Södermanland Regiment (P 10). In 1966, another building was erected next to the main building. When the Eastern Military District (Milo Ö) and Bergslagen Military District (Milo B) merged, the property was taken over by the Middle Military District (Milo M). On 1 July 2000, the property was taken over by the Central Military District. After the Central Military District was disbanded in 2005, the property was vacated on 30 June 2007. In the spring of 2015, the property was demolished with the two office complexes. The property included a boat dock and a heliport.

== Heraldry and traditions ==
=== Coat of arms ===
The coat of the arms of the Middle Military District Staff (Milo S) 1991–2000, and the Central Military District Staff (MD N) 2000–2005. Blazon: "Or, the provincial badge of Södermanland, a griffon segreant sable, armed and langued gules, on a chief azur three open crowns fesswise or. The shield surmounting an erect sword of the last colour.".

=== Colours, standards and guidons ===
The command flag of the commanding officer of the Central Military District is drawn by Kristina Holmgård-Åkerberg and embroidered by hand in insertion technique by Sofie Thorburn. Blazon: "On blue cloth an erect yellow sword; in the first corner a griffon segreant under three open crowns fesswise, all yellow".

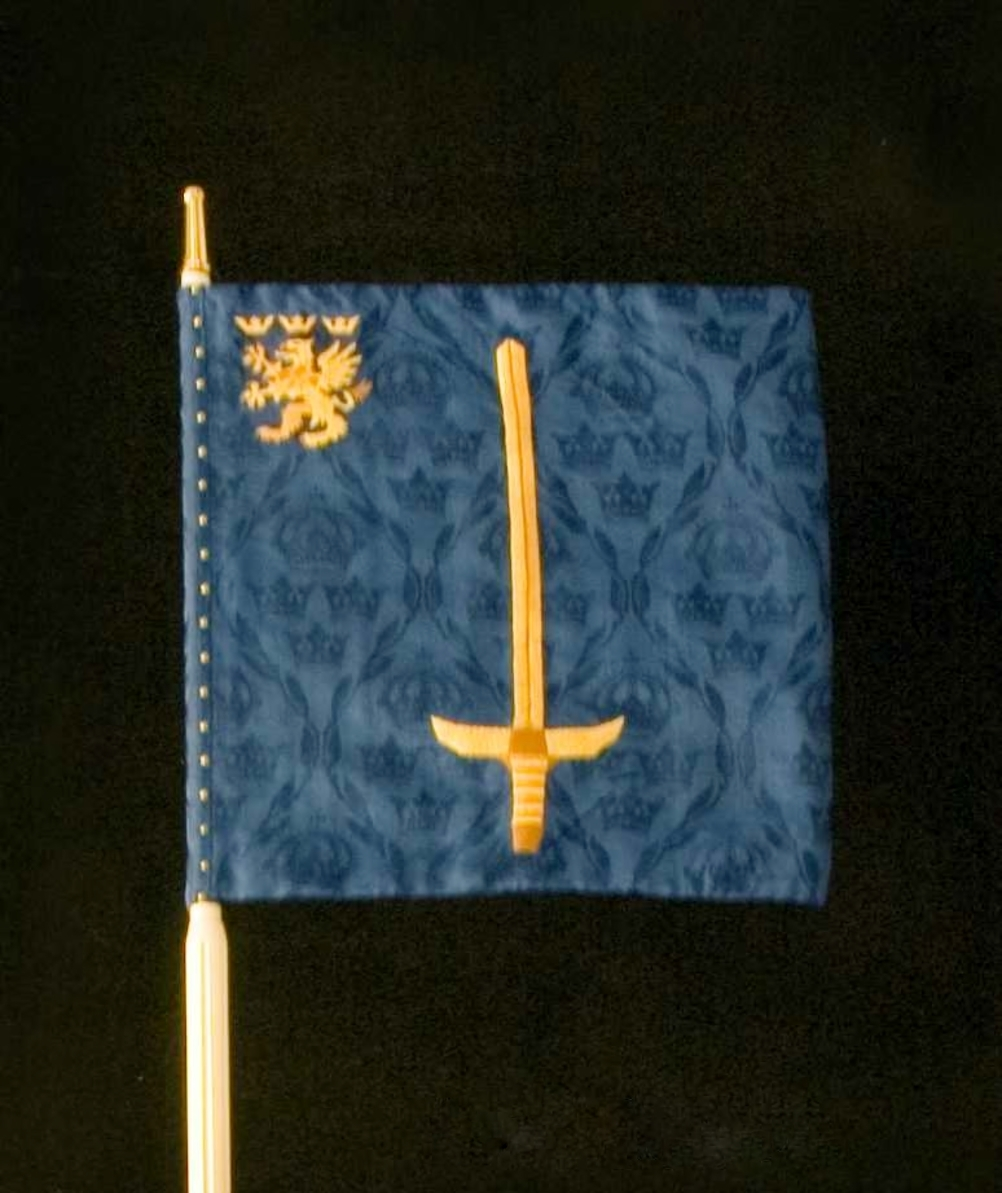
Command flag

=== Medals ===
In 2003, the Mellersta militärdistriktets (MD M) förtjänstmedalj ("Central Military District Medal of Merit") in gold and silver (MDMGM/SM) of the 8th size was established. The medal ribbon is of yellow moiré with a narrow blue and a narrow black stripe on each side and a broad red stripe on the middle.

In 2005, the Mellersta militärdistriktets (MD M) minnesmedalj ("Central Military District Commemorative Medal") in silver (MDMMSM) of the 8th size was established. The medal ribbon is of yellow moiré with a narrow red stripe on each side and a black stripe on the middle.

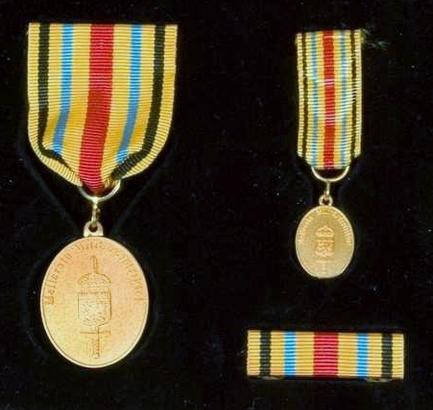
Medal of Merit in gold

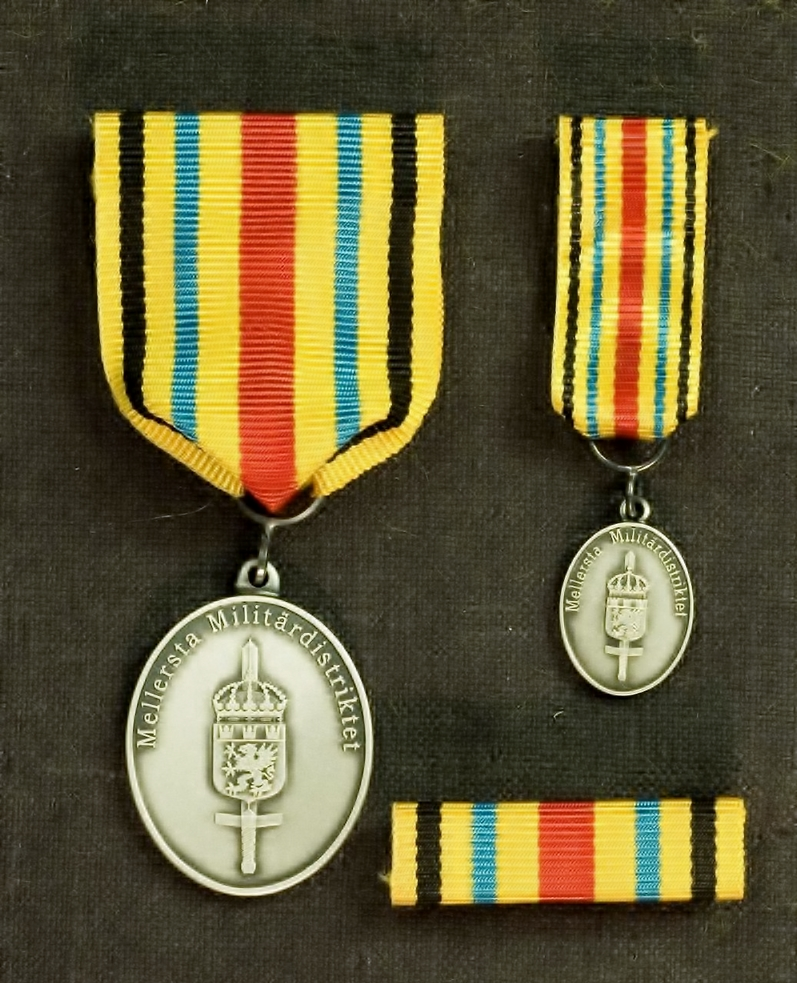
Medal of Merit in silver

Ribbon bar of the medal of merit

Ribbon bar of the commemorative medal

== Commanding officers ==
The commander of the Central Military District was also the Commandant General in Stockholm. The Garrison Department was part of the Life Guards.

=== Military district commanders ===
- 2000–2001: Major general Kjell Koserius
- 2001–2002: Major general Curt Westberg
- 2002–2005: Major general Bo Waldemarsson
- 2005–2005: Colonel Bengt Degerman

=== Chiefs of staff ===
- 2000–2004: Senior colonel Knut Einar Henning Jonasson
- 2004–2005: Lieutenant colonel Ulf Robert Johansson

=== Deputy Chiefs of Staff ===
- 2004–2005: Lieutenant colonel Bertil Nils Dahlrot

== Names, designations and locations ==
Name	Translation	From		To
Mellersta militärdistriktet	Central Military District	2000-07-01	–	2005-12-31
Avvecklingsorganisation	Decommissioning Organisation	2006-01-01	–	2006-06-30
Designation		From		To
MD S		2000-07-01	–	2005-12-31
Ao MD M		2006-01-01	–	2006-06-30
Location		From		To
Strängnäs Garrison		2000-07-01	–	2006-06-30
