= Commandant General in Stockholm =

Official post

- Överkommendanten i Stockholm

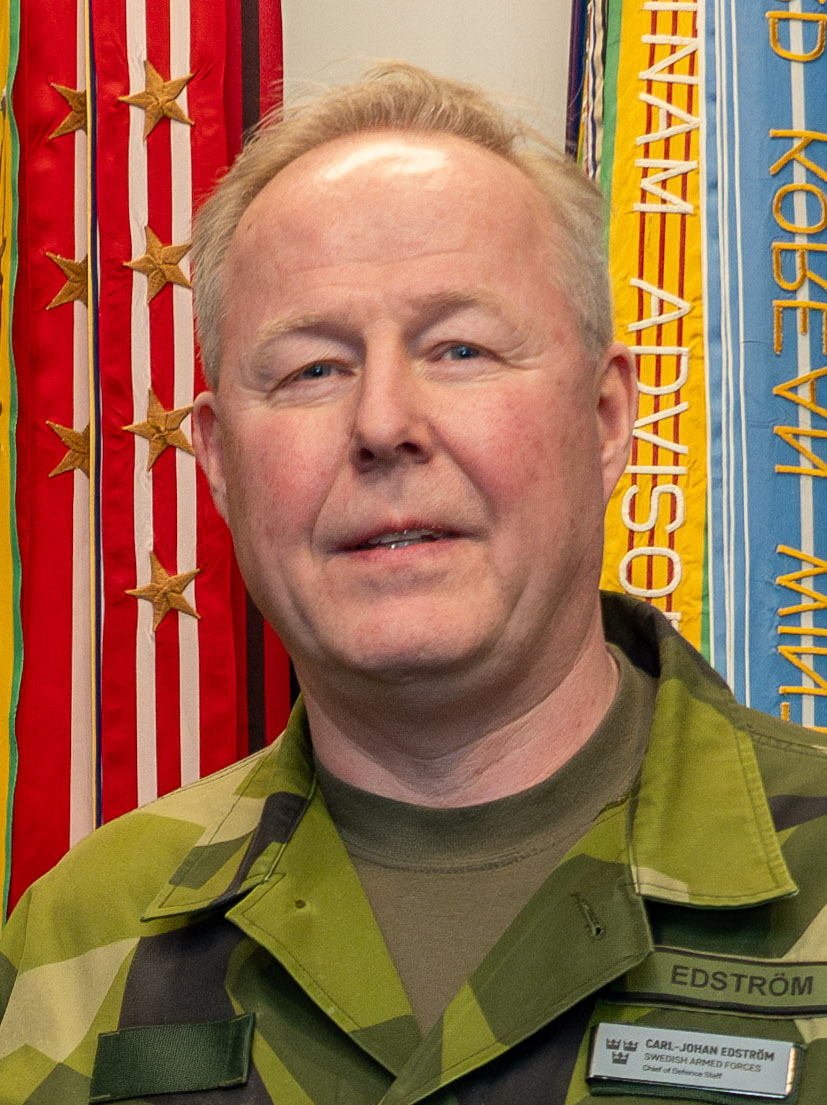
- Incumbent; LTG Carl-Johan Edström, Swedish Air Force since 1 October 2024
- Reports to: Supreme Commander
- Seat: Stockholm Palace
- Appointer: Supreme Commander
- Constituting instrument: FFS 2018:3; FFS 2018:6
- Formation: 1818
- First holder: Georg Henrik Jägerhorn
- Deputy: Commandant of Stockholm

The Commandant General in Stockholm (Swedish: Överkommendanten i Stockholm) is a military position in Sweden with responsibility for state ceremonial activities. Lieutenant General Carl-Johan Edström, Chief of Defence Staff is the Commandant General in Stockholm since 1 October 2024.

== History ==
The King's Adjutant General was tasked with, among other things, commanding the troops in Stockholm. In 1810 a commanding Adjutant General of Stockholm Garrison was appointed. In 1818, this position was referred to as the Commandant General of Stockholm Garrison (Swedish: Överkommendant för Stockholms garnison). Prior to November 1905, the Commandant General was a specially appointed general officer, after which the position was taken over by the commanding officer of the IV Army Division (1905–1927), Eastern Army Division (1928–1936), IV Army Division (1937–1942), then by the military commander of the Eastern Military District (Milo Ö) (1942–1991), then by the commanding officer of the Middle Military District (Milo M) (1991–2000), and finally by the commanding officer of the Central Military District (MD M) (2000–2005). After 2005, when the military districts were discontinued, a three-star general or flag officer of the Swedish Armed Forces has held the position as the Commandant General. The position was held by the Chief of Joint Operations (2005–2012) and by the Chief of Defence Staff (2012–2018). Since 30 November 2018, the Supreme Commander has appointed the Commandant General in Stockholm.

== Tasks ==
=== 2005–2018 ===
According to the Swedish Armed Forces Code of Statutes 2005:6, the Commandant General in Stockholm is the chief representative of the state ceremonial activities of the Swedish Armed Forces. The Commandant General shall advise the Supreme Commander in matters relating to state ceremonial activities. The Commandant General is appointed by Supreme Commander and must be a minimum of major general. The Commandant General in Stockholm and the Commandant of Stockholm are:

1. The Commandant General or the Commandant of Stockholm shall, if necessary, participate in state ceremonies or at other ceremonies organized in conjunction with national ceremonies or foreign official visits in Sweden or on similar occasions. They will also participate in receptions or visits if the King, the Regent ad interim, the Speaker of the Riksdag, the Prime Minister, the Marshal of the Realm, a cabinet minister or the Swedish Armed Forces Headquarters request it.
2. It is the responsibility of the Commandant General or when he is prevented from attending, the Commandant of Stockholm, to receive such heads of foreign states' military units on an official visit in Stockholm, in the Royal Guards Wing of the Stockholm Palace.

=== 2018–present ===
According to the Swedish Armed Forces Code of Statutes 2018:3, the Commandant General shall:

1. brief the Supreme Commander on matters relating to state ceremonial activities
2. coordinate the Swedish Armed Forces' participation in state ceremonial activities
3. at the request of the Speaker of the Riksdag, the Prime Minister, the Marshal of the Realm, a cabinet minister or the Swedish Armed Forces Headquarters, give the Commandant Staff (Kommendantstaben) the task of planning and implementing the participation of the Royal Guards, honorary forces, parading troops and military music
4. cooperate with the Speaker of the Riksdag, the Prime Minister, the Marshal of the Realm and the Chief of His Majesty's Military Staff in matters concerning state ceremonies
5. collaborate with other authorities and organizations in joint ceremonies
6. establish rules of procedure for the Commandant Staff
7. if necessary, attend state ceremonies and ceremonies organized in connection with domestic ceremonies or foreign official visits or on similar occasions
8. participate in receptions or visits if the head of state, Deputy Regent (Riksföreståndare), the Speaker of the Riksdag, the Prime Minister, the Marshal of the Realm, a cabinet minister or the Swedish Armed Forces Headquarters so request
9. in the Royal Guards Wing at Stockholm Palace receive heads of foreign states' military units who are on an official visit to Stockholm.

The Commandant General in Stockholm may delegate the tasks to the Commandant of Stockholm.

== Uniform ==
The Commandant General is wearing a staff (m/1793) that is steel blue and sprinkled with gold crowns and fitted with a gold knob and chape. The staff is provided with a twist in gold and black silk with a hard braided tuft. At the deposing of King Gustav IV Adolf in March 1809, the staff played an important symbolic role as the one who held the staff is also associated with the person who was in charge in Stockholm.

== Heraldry ==
The coat of arms of the Commandant General in Stockholm. Blazon: "Azure, powdered with open crowns and charged with the badge of Stockholm, the crowned head of Saint Eric couped, all or. The shield surmounted a sword bendwise and a baton bendwise sinister in saltire, both or, the baton charged with open crowns azure placed two and one".

== List of officeholders ==
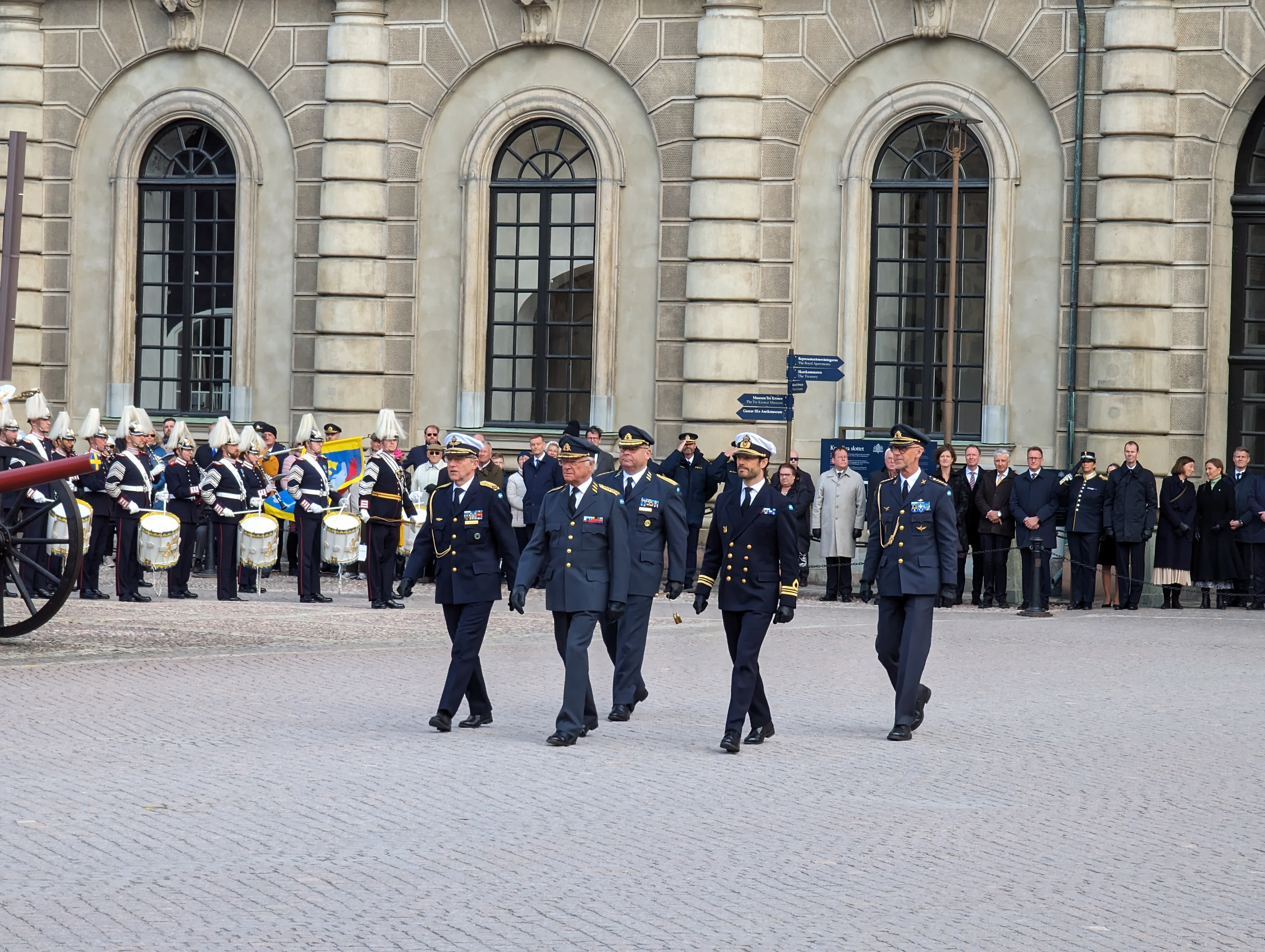
The Commandant General, Lieutenant General Michael Claesson (center) in 2023.

Portrait	Name	Took office	Left office	Time in office	Defence branch	Ref.
Georg Henrik Jägerhorn	Lieutenant general Georg Henrik Jägerhorn (1747–1826)	1812	1812	0 years	Army	-
Carl Fredrik Lorichs	Major general (Note: Promoted to lieutenant general 6 months later, on 1 December 1838.); Carl Fredrik Lorichs (1780–1851)	28 May 1838	?	-	Army	
Johan Lefrén	Lieutenant general Johan Lefrén (1784–1862)	25 November 1852	16 December 1857	5 years, 21 days	Army	
Samuel Wilhelm Nauckhoff	Major general Samuel Wilhelm Nauckhoff (1795–1889); Acting	1857	1866	8–9 years	Army	
Ulrik Fabian Sandels	Major general Ulrik Fabian Sandels (1812–1898)	1866	1871	4–5 years	Army	-
Samuel August Sandels	Major general Samuel August Sandels (1810–1892); Acting	25 September 1871	16 January 1882	10 years, 113 days	Army	
Sven Lagerberg	Major general Sven Lagerberg (1822–1905); Acting	14 July 1876	?	-	Army	
Sven Lagerberg	Lieutenant general Sven Lagerberg (1822–1905)	21 January 1882	25 March 1905	23 years, 63 days	Army	
Hemming Gadd	Lieutenant general Hemming Gadd (1837–1915)	March 1905	November 1905	0 years	Army	
Carl Warberg	Lieutenant general Carl Warberg (1845–1910)	November 1905	16 October 1910	4–5 years	Army	
Hugo Jungstedt	Major general Hugo Jungstedt (1854–1936)	28 October 1910	1916	5–6 years	Army	
J.G.F. Wrangel	Major general J.G.F. Wrangel (1858–1923)	1 January 1917	1918	0–1 years	Army	
Karl Toll	Major general Karl Toll (1862–1936)	3 September 1918	31 December 1927	9 years, 119 days	Army	
Ludvig Hammarskiöld	Major general Ludvig Hammarskiöld (1869–1958)	1928	1929	0–1 years	Army	-
Bo Boustedt	Major general Bo Boustedt (1868–1939)	1929	1930	0–1 years	Army	
Gösta Lilliehöök	Major general Gösta Lilliehöök (1871–1952)	23 April 1930 (Note: Appointed on 16 April 1930.)	1936	5–6 years	Army	
Erik Testrup	Major general Erik Testrup (1878–1972)	1936	1943	5–6 years	Army	-
Gösta Lilliehöök	Major general Gösta Lilliehöök (1871–1952)	April 1940	December 1940	0 years	Army	
Helge Jung	Major general Helge Jung (1886–1978)	1943	1944	0–1 years	Army	-
Axel Rappe	Major general Axel Rappe (1884–1945)	1 April 1944 (Note: Rappe was appointed on 21 February 1944 and was supposed to take command on 1 April 1944. However, the nomination was recalled, most likely to keep Rappe on the post as commanding officer of the I Army Corps (Första armékåren))	-	-	Army	
Arvid Moberg	Major general Arvid Moberg (1885–1949); Acting	1944	1945	0–1 years	Army	
Gustaf Dyrssen	Major general Gustaf Dyrssen (1891–1981)	1945	1957	11–12 years	Army	-
Bert Carpelan	Major general Bert Carpelan (1895–1981)	1957	1961	3–4 years	Army	-
Gustav Åkerman	Major general Gustav Åkerman (1901–1988)	1961	1966	4–5 years	Army	-
Carl Eric Almgren	Lieutenant general Carl Eric Almgren (1913–2001)	1967	1969	1–2 years	Army	-
Ove Ljung	Lieutenant general Ove Ljung (1918–1997)	1969	1974	4–5 years	Army	-
Nils Sköld	Lieutenant general Nils Sköld (1921–1996)	1974	1976	1–2 years	Army	-
Gunnar Eklund	Lieutenant general Gunnar Eklund (1920–2010)	1976	1982	5–6 years	Navy (Coastal Artillery)	-
Bengt Lehander	Lieutenant general Bengt Lehander (1925–1994)	1982	1988	5–6 years	Air Force	-
Bror Stefenson	Vice admiral Bror Stefenson (1929–2018)	1988	1991	2–3 years	Navy	-
Torsten Engberg	Lieutenant general Torsten Engberg (1934–2018)	1991	1994	2–3 years	Navy (Coastal Artillery)	-
Dick Börjesson	Vice admiral Dick Börjesson (born 1938)	1994	1998	3–4 years	Navy	-
Percurt Green	Lieutenant general Percurt Green (1939–2025)	1998	2000	1–2 years	Army	-
Kjell Koserius	Major general Kjell Koserius (1943–2002)	2000	2001	0–1 years	Air Force	-
Curt Westberg	Major general Curt Westberg (born 1943)	2001	2003	1–2 years	Air Force	-
Bo Waldemarsson	Major general Bo Waldemarsson (born 1949)	2003	2005	1–2 years	Air Force	-
Jan Jonsson	Lieutenant general Jan Jonsson (1952–2021)	2006	2007	0–1 years	Air Force	-
Anders Lindström	Lieutenant general Anders Lindström (born 1955)	2008	2011	2–3 years	Army	-
Jan Salestrand	Lieutenant general Jan Salestrand (born 1954)	2012	2014	1–2 years	Air Force	-
Dennis Gyllensporre	Lieutenant general Dennis Gyllensporre (born 1964)	2014	2018	3–4 years	Army	-
Jonas Haggren	Vice admiral Jonas Haggren (born 1964)	2018	2019	0–1 years	Navy	-
Jan Thörnqvist	Vice admiral Jan Thörnqvist (born 1959)	2019	2020	0–1 years	Navy	-
Michael Claesson	Lieutenant general Michael Claesson (born 1965)	10 September 2020	30 September 2024	4 years, 20 days	Army	
Carl-Johan Edström	Lieutenant general Carl-Johan Edström (born 1967)	1 October 2024	Incumbent	1 year, 341 days	Air Force	-
