= Defence Act of 2000 (Sweden) =

The Defence Act of 2000 (prop. 1999/2000:30) was a defence act passed by the Swedish Riksdag on 30 March 2000, and the largest reorganisation of the Swedish Armed Forces since the Defence Act of 1925. The act was a continuation of the policies set in motion by the Defence Act of 1996: shifting the military's focus from the defence of Swedish territory to a more flexible "operational defence" (Swedish: insatsförsvar) for smaller-scale peacekeeping operations in foreign nations. Many military formations were disbanded as a result.

== Summary ==
The future organisation decided by the act included, up until 2004, the following military units:

- A headquarters, an operational command, and four military district commands.
- An army divisional command, formed of an NBC task force and two rifle battalions.
- 6 army brigade commands, 16 mechanised battalions, 4 air defence battalions, 4 howitzer battalions, 4 pioneer battalions, 4 maintenance battalions, 6 urban warfare battalions and 1 battalion of paratroopers.
- 2 surface flotillas with a combined total of 12 surface vessels.
- 1 submarine flotilla with 5 submarines.
- A minesweeper flotilla.
- An amphibious brigade command and 3 amphibious battalions.
- 8 divisions of JAS 39 Gripen jets.
- 2 helicopter battalions, one with a focus on ground operations and another with a focus on naval operations.
- National Defence Troops, including among others 12 ground combat battalions and elements of the Home Guard.

Percentage of the Swedish GDP spent on the Armed Forces during the years following the Defence Act
Year	Percent of GDP
2001	1,7
2002	1,6
2003	1,6
2004	1,4
2005	1,4

== Disbanded units, commands and academies ==
=== Armed Forces Commands ===
Military districts (Militärområden)

- Milo N - Northern Military District, Boden.
- Milo M - Middle Military District, Strängnäs.
- Milo S - Southern Military District, Kristianstad.
- MKG - Gotland Military Command, Visby.

Divisions

- Eastern Army Division, Strängnäs.
- Northern Army Division, Boden.
- Southern Army Division, Kristianstad

Service Branch Commands (försvarsgrensstaber)

- AC - Army Center, Enköping.
- FC - Air Force Center, Uppsala.
- MC - Navy Center, Haninge/Berga.

=== Army ===
Infantry regiments

- I 1 - Svea Life Guards, Upplands-Bro. (Reorganised into the Life Guards)
- I 2 - Värmland Regiment, Kristinehamn.
- I 3 - Life Regiment Grenadiers, Örebro.
- I 12 - Småland Regiment, Eksjö.
- I 13 - Dalarna Regiment, Falun.
- I 16 - Halland Regiment, Halmstad.
- I 20 - Västerbotten Regiment, Umeå.
- I 21 - Västernorrland Regiment, Sollefteå.
- I 22 - Lapland Ranger Regiment, Kiruna.

Infantry Brigades/Norrland Brigades

- IB 1 - Life Guard Brigade, Upplands-Bro.
- IB 2 - Värmland Brigade, Kristinehamn.
- NB 5 - Field Rifle Brigade, Östersund. (Reorganised into I 5 Field Rifle Regiment)
- IB 12 - Småland Brigade, Eksjö.
- NB 13 - Dala Brigade, Falun.
- IB 16 - Halland Brigade, Halmstad.
- NB 21 - Ångermanland Brigade, Sollefteå.

Cavalry

- K 1 - Life Guard Dragoons, Stockholm. (Today part of LG - Life Guards)

Armoured troops

- P 2 - Scanian Dragoon Regiment, Hässleholm.

Mechanised brigades

- MekB 7 - Southern Scanian Brigade, Revingehed.
- MekB 8 - Scanian Dragoon Brigade, Hässleholm.
- MekB 9 - Skaraborg Brigade, Skövde.
- MekB 10 - Södermanland Brigade, Strängnäs.
- MekB 18 - Gotland Brigade, Visby.
- MekB 19 - Norrbotten Brigade, Boden.

Artillery

- ArtSS - Artillery Combat School, Kristinehamn. (Today part of the Artillery Regiment)
- A 3 - Wendes Artillery Regiment, Hässleholm.
- A 7 - Gotland Artillery Regiment, Visby.
- A 8 - Norrland Artillery Regiment, Boden. (Today a battalion of the Norrbotten Regiment)
- A 9 - Bergslagen Artillery Regiment, Kristinehamn. (Reorganised into the Artillery Regiment)

Air Defence troops

- LvSS - Air Defence Combat School, Norrtälje. (Relocated to Halmstad and part of the Air Defence Regiment).
- Lv 2 - Gotland Anti-Aircraft Corps, Visby.
- Lv 3 - Roslagen Anti-Aircraft Corps, Norrtälje.
- Lv 6 - Göta Anti-Aircraft Corps, Halmstad. (Reorganised into the Air Defence Regiment)
- Lv 7 - Norrland Anti-Aircraft Corps, Luleå. (Today part of the Norrbotten Regiment)

Combat engineers

- Ing 3 - Boden Engineer Regiment, Boden. (Today a battalion of the Norrbotten Regiment)

Signal troops

- S 3 - Norrland Signal Regiment, Boden. (Today a battalion of the Norrbotten Regiment)

Army Service Troops (trängtrupperna)

- T 2 - Göta Logistic Corps, Skövde. (Reorganised into Göta Logistic Regiment)
- T 3 - Norrland Logistic Corps, Boden. (Today a battalion of the Norrbotten Regiment)

=== Air Force ===
- FKN - Northern Air Command, Luleå.
- FKM - Middle Air Command, Upplands-Bro.
- FKS - Southern Air Command, Ängelholm.
- F 10 - Scania Wing. (Disbanded by 2002)
- F 16 - Uppland Wing. (Disbanded by 2004)
- 1. hkpbat - Norrland Helicopter Battalion, Boden. (Reorganised into a squadron)
- 3. hkpbat - Göta Helicopter Battalion, Säve. (Reorganised into a squadron)

=== Navy ===
- MKN - Norrland Coast Naval Command, Härnösand.
- MKO - East Coast Naval Command, Haninge/Muskö.
- MKS - South Coast Naval Command, Karlskrona.
- MKV - West Coast Naval Command, Gothenburg.
- KA 1 - Vaxholm Coastal Artillery Regiment. (Reorganised into Amf 1)
- KA 2 - Karlskrona Coastal Artillery Regiment.
- KA 3 - Gotland Coastal Artillery Regiment.
- KA 4 - Älvsborg Coastal Artillery Regiment. (Reorganised into Amf 4)

=== Defence districts (försvarsområden) ===
(Note: A defence district (Försvarsområde, shortened Fo) was the command level below military district (militärområde). Every defence district was part of a defence district group (Fogrupp), which was a part of a combined combat group which had the same strength as a brigade, as it was composed of between one and four battalions. A defence district was commanded by the Defence District Commander, who was simultaneously the commander of a Defence District Regiment.)

- Fo 14 Defence District Kristianstad, Hässleholm
- Fo 15 Karlskrona
- Fo 17 Eksjö
- Fo 23 Sollefteå
- Fo 31 Halmstad
- Fo 32 Gothenburg
- Fo 43 Strängnäs
- Fo 44 Kungsängen
- Fo 47 Enköping
- Fo 51 Örebro
- Fo 52 Kristinehamn
- Fo 53 Falun
- Fo 61 Umeå
- Fo 63 Boden
- Fo 66 Kiruna (GJ 66)
- Fo 67 Kalix (GJ 67)

== Established units, commands and academies ==
=== Armed Forces Commands ===
- ATK - Army Tactical Command, Uppsala.
- FTK - Air Force Tactical Command, Uppsala.
- MTK - Naval Tactical Command, Uppsala.
- OPIL - Joint Forces Command, Uppsala.
- 1. Mekdiv - Mechanised Division, Stockholm.

=== Army ===
Artillery

- A 9 - Artillery Regiment, Kristinehamn (in 2005 moved to Boden).

Infantry/Cavalry

- LG - Life Guards, Kungsängen/Upplands-Bro.
- I 19 - Norrbotten Regiment, Boden.
- P 4 - Skaraborg Regiment, Skövde.
- P 7 - South Scanian Regiment, Revingehed/Lund.

=== Navy ===
Fleet

- MarinB O - East Coast Naval Base, Muskö.
- MarinB S - South Coast Naval Base, Karlskrona.
- 2.ysflj - Second Surface Combat Flotilla, Berga.

Amphibious Corps

- Amf 1 - Vaxholm Amphibian Regiment, Vaxholm.
- Amf 4 - Älvsborg Amphibian Regiment, Gothenburg.
- AmfSS - Amphibious Combat School, Vaxholm.

=== Military districts ===
- MD N - Northern Military District, Boden.
- MD M - Central Military District, Strängnäs.
- MD S - Southern Military District, Gothenburg.
- MD G - Gotland Military District, Visby.

Military district groups

- Blekinge Group, Karlskrona.
- BohusDal Group, Uddevalla.
- Dal Regimental Group, Falun.
- Gotland Group, Visby.
- Gävleborg Group, Gävle.
- Gothenburg Group, Gothenburg.
- Halland Group, Halmstad.
- Härnösand Group, Härnösand.
- Jämtland Group, Östersund.
- Kalmar Group, Kalmar.
- Kronoberg Group, Växjö.
- Lappland Rifle Group, Kiruna.
- Life Guards Group, Stockholm.
- Life Grenadier Group, Linköping.
- Life Regimental Grenadier's Group, Örebro.
- Northern Småland Group, Eksjö.
- Norrbotten Group, Boden.
- Norrbotten Border Rifles Group, Kalix.
- Skaraborg Group, Skövde.
- Scanian Dragoon Group, Hässleholm.
- Södermanland Group, Strängnäs.
- Södertörn Group, Muskö.
- Southern Scanian Group, Revingehed.
- Uppland Group, Enköping.
- Värmland Group, Kristinehamn.
- Västerbotten Group, Umeå.
- West Norrland Group, Sollefteå.
- Västmanland Group, Västerås.
- Älvsborg Group, Borås.
