= Central Command =

Central Command may refer to:

- United States Central Command
- AFP Central Command (Philippines)
- Central Command (India)
- Central Command (Israel)
- Central Command of the Arab Socialist Ba'ath Party – Syria Region
- Central Command for Maritime Emergencies (Germany)

== See also ==
- Central Air Command (disambiguation)
