= Gotland Military District =

Swedish Military District

Coordinates: 57°36′57.2″N 18°16′57.3″E

- Gotlands militärdistrikt
- Active: 2000–2004
- Country: Sweden
- Allegiance: Swedish Armed Forces
- Branch: Joint
- Type: Military district
- Role: Operational, territorial and tactical operations
- Part of: Swedish Armed Forces Headquarters
- Garrison/HQ: Visby
- Colors: Blue and yellow
- March: "General Wahlgrens marsch" (Sjölin) (Note: The march was adopted in 2000 and established on 27 November 2002.)

Gotland Military District (Swedish: Gotlands militärdistrikt, MD G) was a military district within the Swedish Armed Forces active between 2000 and 2004. The staff was located within Gotland Garrison in Visby on Gotland.

== History ==
Gotland Military District was formed on 1 July 2000 and was one of four military districts, which were added in connection with the three military regions was decommissioned on 30 June 2000 as a result of the Defence Act of 2000. When the formation of the Gotland Military District occurred, the traditions and heraldic arms of the former Gotland Military Command was taken over.

Gotland Military District was later decommissioned in connection with the Defence Act of 2004. On 17 December 2004 the decommissioning was manifested through a closure and handover ceremony and on 31 December 2004 the district was officially ceased. Its territorial tasks and responsibilities were then transferred from 1 January 2005 to the Central Military District in Strängnäs. Remaining on Gotland was a decommissioning organization until 31 December 2005.

== Operations ==
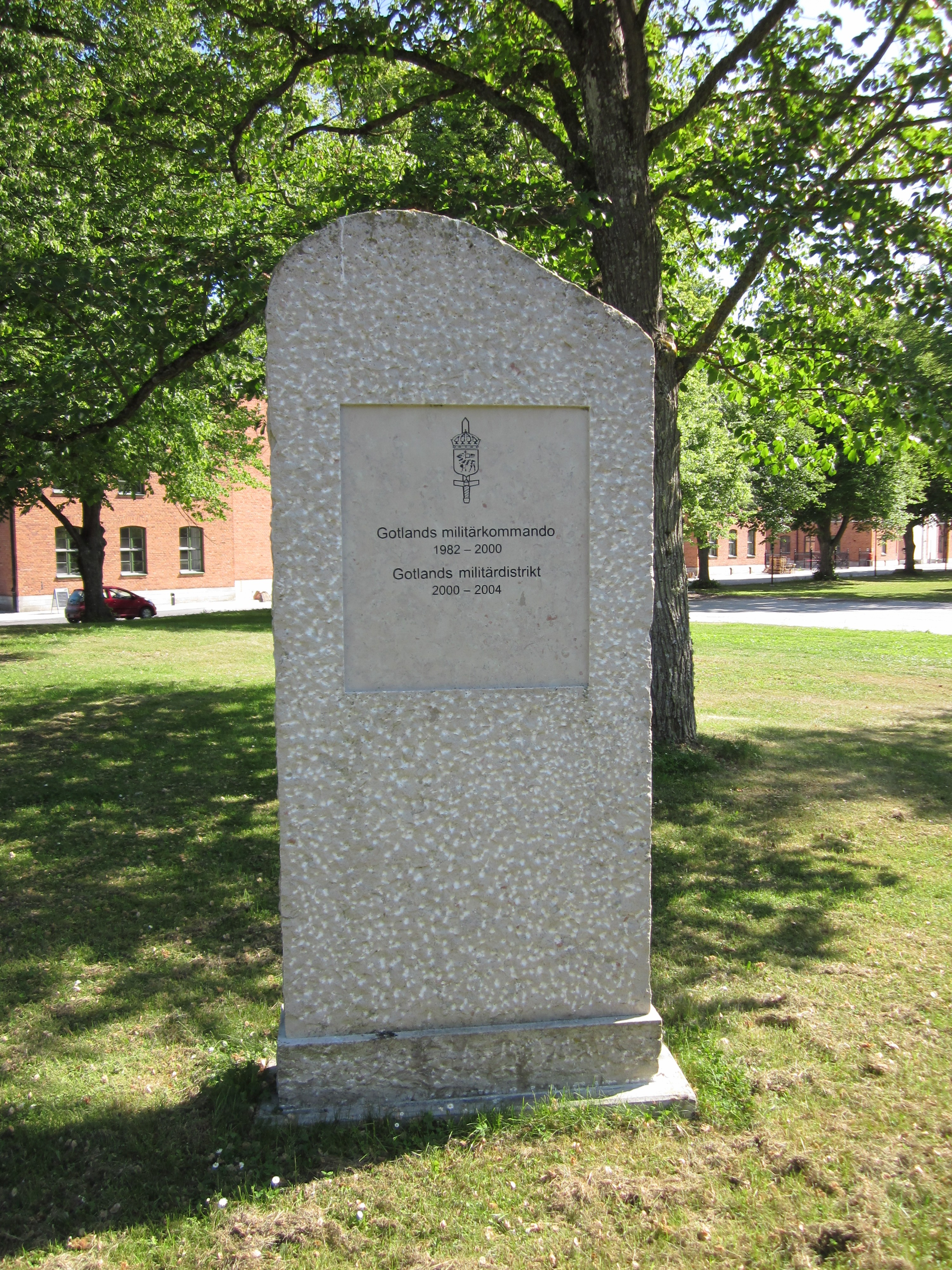
Memorial stone at P 18. Inscription reads: "Gotland Military Command 1982–2000. Gotland Military District 2000–2004."

Gotland Military District consisted of a commanding officer, a staff and a military district group (a total of about 40 employees). The military districts was the regional level in the Swedish Armed Forces' organization and had the following tasks: territorial operations, defense planning, mobilization preparations, intelligence and security service, Home Guard training, voluntary defense activities, physical planning, staff service and operations. This means that the Swedish Armed Forces' contacts with civil authorities and organizations on Gotland largely were handled through the Gotland Military District. Among other things, the military district represented the Swedish Armed Forces in the government pledged assignment on civil-military cooperation, i.e. the crisis cooperation called "Collaboration on Gotland" (Samverkan på Gotland, GotSam).

Each military district consisted of a number of military districts groups. Within the Gotland Military District was the Home Guard unit called the Gotland Group. I connection of the decommissioning of the Gotland Military District, the territorial responsibility and responsibility of the Gotland Group, was transferred on 1 January 2005 to the Central Military District.

== Heraldry and traditions ==
=== Coat of arms ===
The coat of arms of the Gotland Military District Staff was used by the Gotland Military Command Staff from 1994 to 2000. Blazon: "Azure, the provincial badge of Gotland, a ram passant argent, armed or, cross and banner gules, staff, edging and five flaps or. The shield surmounted an erect sword or".

=== Colours, standards and guidons ===
The command flag of the commanding officer of Gotland Military District is drawn by Kristina Holmgård-Åkerberg and embroidered by hand in insertion technique by Maj Britt Salander/company Blå Kusten. Blazon: "On blue cloth an erect yellow sword; in the first corner a white ram passant armed yellow and a crosstaff and a banner with edging and five flaps, all yellow".

=== Medals ===
In 2005, the Gotlands militärdistriktets (MD G) minnesmedalj ("Gotland Military District (MD G) Commemorative Medal") in silver (MDGMSM) of the 8th size was established. The medal was oval and the medal ribbon is divided in blue, yellow and blue moiré. The district coat of arms is attached to the ribbon.

== Commanding officers ==
=== Military district commanders ===
- 2000–2001: Major general Curt Westberg
- 2001–2004: Brigadier general Bengt Jerkland
- June 2004 – January 2005: Colonel Karl Engelbrektson (acting)

=== Chiefs of Staff ===
- 2000–2004: Colonel Anders EK

== Names, designations and locations ==
| Name | Translation | From | | To |
|---|---|---|---|---|
| Gotlands militärdistrikt | Gotland Military District | 2000-07-01 | – | 2004-12-31 |
| Avvecklingsorganisation | Decommissioning Organisation | 2005-01-01 | – | 2005-12-31 |
| Designation | | From | | To |
| MD G | | 2000-07-01 | – | 2004-12-31 |
| Location | | From | | To |
| Visby Garrison | | 2000-07-01 | – | 2005-12-31 |
