= Billinge, Sweden =

Billinge
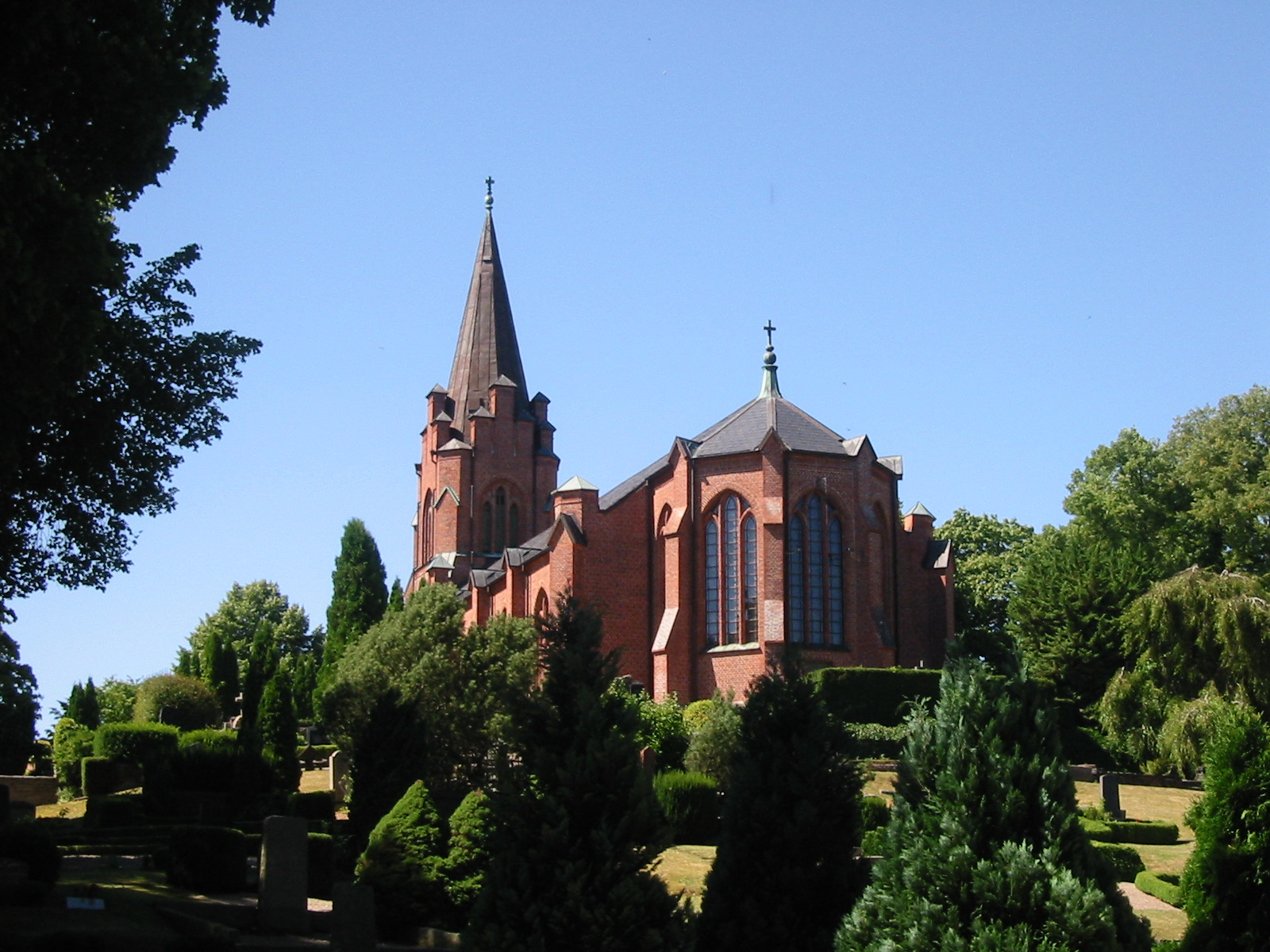
- Billinge Church in July 2008

- Location within Skåne Location within Sweden
- Coordinates: 55°58′N 13°20′E
- Country: Sweden
- Province: Skåne
- County: Skåne County
- Municipality: Eslöv Municipality

Area
  - Total: 0.59 km^{2} (0.23 sq mi)

Population (31 December 2010)
  - Total: 415
  - Density: 704/km^{2} (1,820/sq mi)
- Time zone: UTC+1 (CET)
  - Summer (DST): UTC+2 (CEST)

Billinge is a locality situated in Eslöv Municipality, Skåne County, Sweden with 415 inhabitants in 2010.
