= EKT Gdynia =

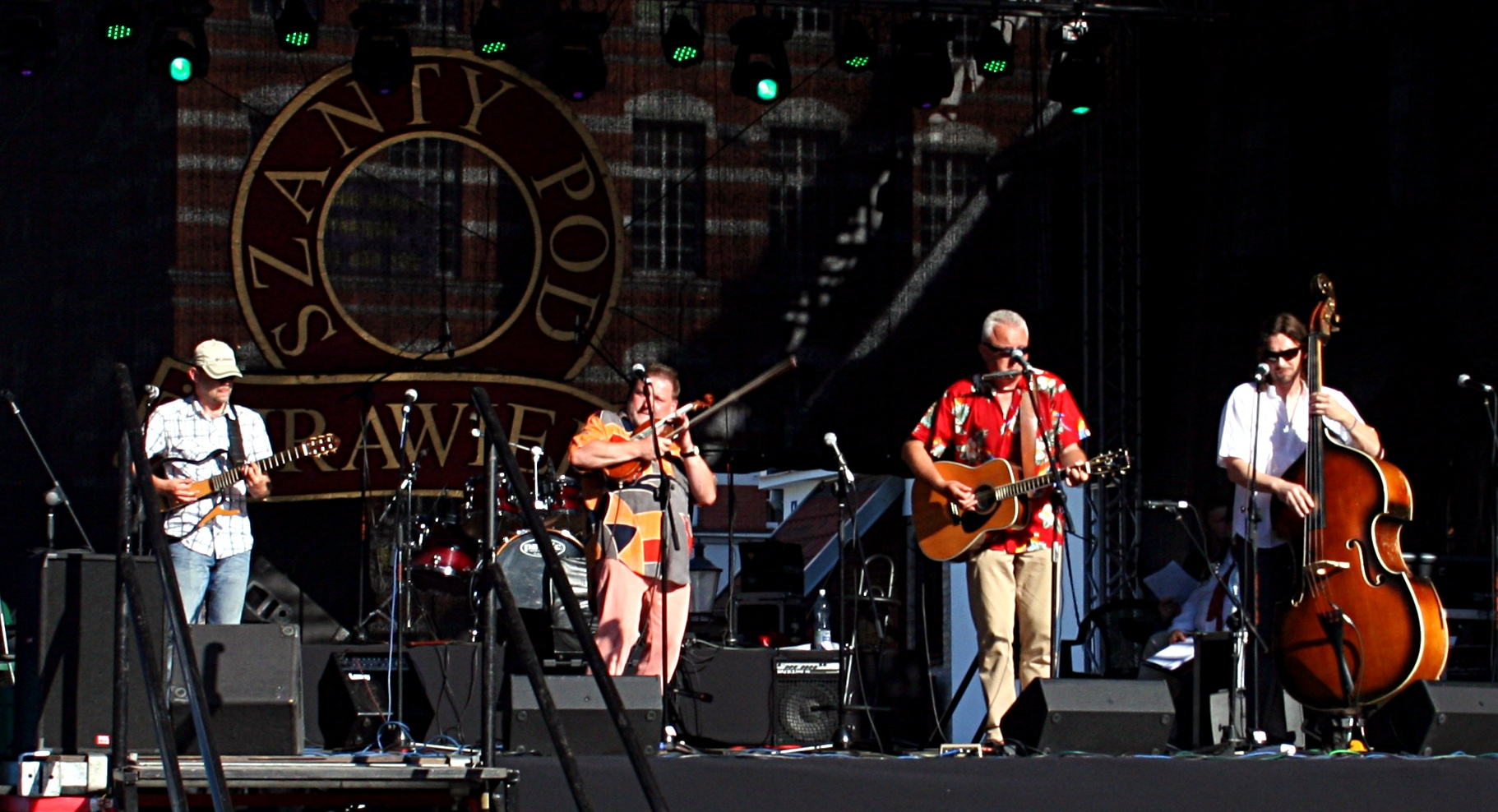
- The band performing near the Crane in Gdańsk in 2010

Background information
- Origin: Gdynia, Poland
- Genres: Sea shanty
- Years active: 1986-present
- Members: Jan Wydra; Ireneusz Wójcicki; Jacek Fimiak; Kamil Szewczyk; Krzysztof Kowalewski

EKT Gdynia - one of the most popular Polish shanty-bands, created by the guitarist and vocalist Jan Wydra in 1986. Ireneusz Wójcicki joined the group in 1987. From the first group the drummer, Jacek Fimiak, has also been playing. During the past 20 years of the existence EKT Gdynia has won many distinctions in sea shanties festivals in Poland and abroad (f.e. in Canada), and hits like 24 February (pol: 24 lutego), The Beskid Pub (pol: Bar w Beskidzie) or People don't sell your dreams (pol: Ludzie, nie sprzedawajcie swych marzeń) have contributed to the sea shanty achievements.

== Lineup ==
- Jan Wydra - vocal, acoustic guitar
- Ireneusz "Messalina" Wójcicki - vocal, tambourine
- Jacek Fimiak - drums, vocal
- Kamil Szewczyk - bass guitar,
- Krzysztof Kowalewski - electric guitar, vocal

== Discography ==
- 1990 Ja stawiam (I'll pay)
- 1994 Oczywiście (Certainly)
- 1998 Wreszcie płynę (I'm sailing at last)
- 1999 Pójdę przez morze (I'll come beyond the sea)
