= Enköpings-Näs Church =

Coordinates: 59°33′37″N 17°00′36″E

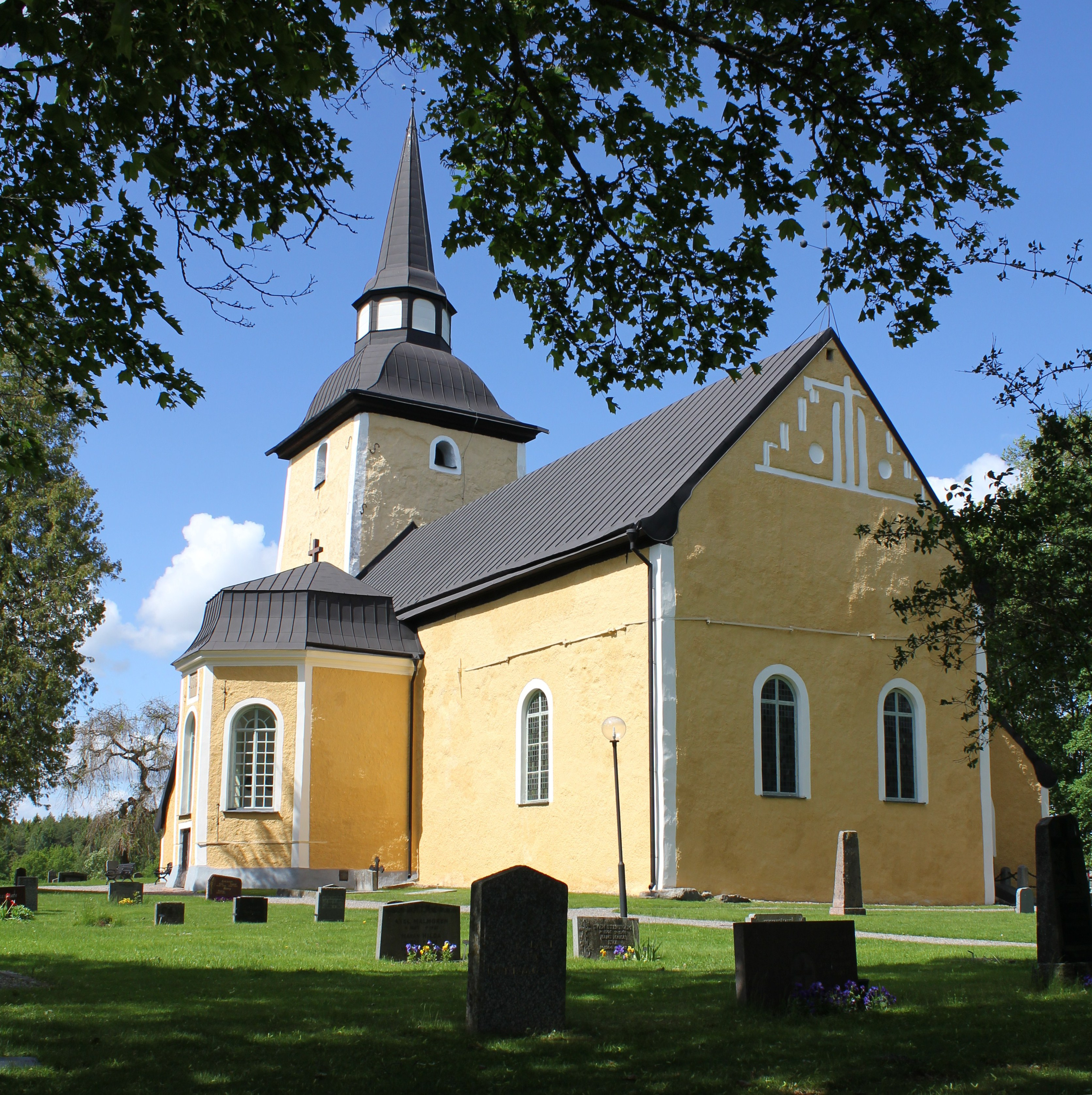
Enköpings-Näs Church, view from the east. To the left is the burial chapel of the Gyllenanckar family

Enköpings-Näs Church (Swedish: Enköpings-Näs kyrka) is a medieval church approximately 10 kilometres (6.2 miles) south of Enköping in Uppsala County, Sweden. It belongs to the Church of Sweden.

== History and architecture ==
The oldest parts of the church are the tower, the northern wall of the nave and parts of the northern wall of the choir. These date from circa 1200, and are all that remains of an earlier, Romanesque church. It was heavily rebuilt in stages from around 1300 to the second half of the 15th century, when the church acquired the present look. The only substantial alteration that has been made since is the addition of the burial chapel of the aristocratic family Gyllenanckar (1623). The spire of the church tower dates from the first half of the 18th century.
