= Gimo Air Base =

Lunda Airfield Lunda flygfält
- IATA: none; ICAO: ESKA

Summary
- Airport type: Public
- Operator: Alliansen för Lunda flygfält
- Location: Gimo
- Elevation AMSL: 75 ft (23 m)
- Coordinates: 60°07′47″N 18°05′50″E
- Website: https://www.lundaalliansen.se/
- Interactive map of Lunda Airfield

Runways
Direction	Length		Surface
Direction	ft	m	Surface
05/23	2,625	800	Asphalt

Gimo Air Base is a former military airfield near the town of Gimo in Sweden. It is no longer used by the military and is now known as Lunda flygfält (Lunda Airfield). Of the 2,000 metres (6,600 ft) of runway only 800 metres (2,600 ft) now remain available for aircraft use. Today, the airfield is mostly used for motorsport events. Aircraft may still use the airfield but this requires prior permission from the operator.
