= Military district (Sweden) =

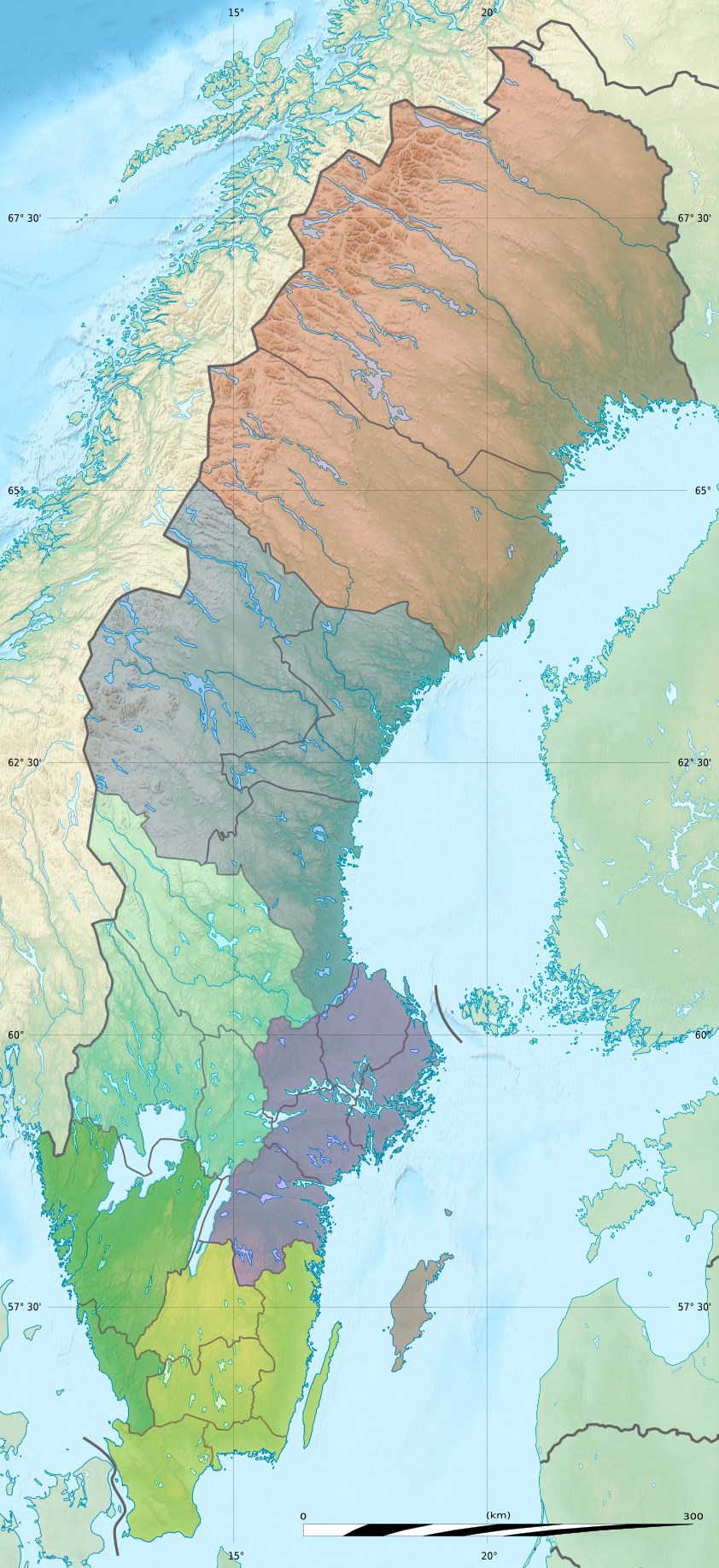
Swedish military districts and military command locations in 1989

In Sweden, a military district was a military subdivision and part of Sweden's military-territorial division. The military districts were established in 1833 and were, after several reorganizations (1847, 1867 and 1889), replaced by army divisions in 1893. In 1942, the military districts (Swedish: Militärområde, Milo) were established as multi-service commands of the Swedish Armed Forces. The military districts in the modern form were created in 1966, and each was named after the geographical area it covered. Several changes were made, such as creating or merging districts, until all military districts were disbanded in 2000 and replaced by another military district (Swedish: Militärdistrikt, MD) organization, which was active until 31 December 2005.

== History ==
Military district in Sweden, was from 1833 to 1892 the highest unit in which the Swedish Army troops were divided into during peace-time. The division, which was made in 1833, replaced the former division of "inspections" and "brigades". The military districts were initially six, but were reduced to five in 1847, after which the 1st Military District included Skåne, Blekinge and Kronoberg counties, the 2nd included Östergötland and the remainder of Småland, the 3rd included Västergötland, Halland, Bohuslän, Dalsland and Värmland, the 4th included Stockholm, Uppland, Södermanland, Västmanland and Närke and 5th included Dalarna and Norrland. The command in a military district was exercised by a Commanding General (general officer). All permanently or temporarily located troops of the army in the district, with the exception of the guard regiments, as well as the fortresses existing within the district, was under his command. In the re-splitting of the army into 6 divisions in 1888, the division into military districts was changed, whereupon the term covered only the territorial division. In the re-splitting of 1892, the designation also fell away and was replaced by arméfördelningsområde ("army division area").

In 1942, the military district (Note: Militärområde is translated as "military district" but also as "military command".) (Swedish: Militärområde, Milo) were established who were multi-service commands of the Swedish Armed Forces. The commander of a military district, the Militärområdesbefälhavare (also called Militärbefälhavare (Note: Militärbefälhavare (MB) can be translated as "Commanding General of Military Command", "Military Commander", "Service Commander", or "Commanding General")), commanded the Swedish Army divisions stationed in the region, the regional naval command, the regional air defence sector as well as the lower regional subdivision defence districts that made up the military district. The commander answered directly to the Supreme Commander. The military districts in the modern form were created in 1966, and each district was named according to the geographical district they covered. Several changes were made, such as creating or merging districts, until all military districts were disbanded in 2000.

Through the Defence Act of 2000, on 1 July 2000, the military districts were replaced by another military district (Swedish: Militärdistrikt, MD) organization, which was active until 31 December 2005. The new military districts geographically corresponded to the old military districts, but did not have territorial and operational tasks. Following the disbandment of the military districts, four Security and Cooperation Sections (Säkerhets- och samverkanssektioner, SäkSam sekt) were organized. The sections were led by the Swedish Armed Forces Headquarters, and had the task of coordinating the military security service and cooperating with regional authorities. From 1 January 2013, these sections were replaced by four military regions (Swedish: Militärregion, MR). The military regions are intended to be subordinated to the Swedish Armed Forces Headquarters and coordinate the land-territorial operations. The military regions can to a certain extent be equated with the former military districts.

== Military districts ==
=== 1833–1847 ===
The military district was established in 1833. Blekinge County stood outside the division and constituted the Flottans militärdistrikt ("Navy's Military District"), as did the island of Gotland. Gotland had an independent military organization, separated from the mainland, of which the highest military as well as civilian authority was exercised by the Governor of Gotland, who also was military commander and commanding officer of Gotland National Conscription.

English name	Swedish name	Location	Active
1st Military District	1. militärdistriktet	Landskrona	1833–1847
2nd Military District	2. militärdistriktet	Växjö	1833–1847
3rd Military District	3. militärdistriktet	Gothenburg	1833–1847
4th Military District	4. militärdistriktet	Stockholm	1833–1847
5th Military District	5. militärdistriktet	Arboga	1833–1847
6th Military District	6. militärdistriktet	Stockholm	1833–1847

=== 1847–1867 ===
In the 1847 subdivision, Blekinge County stood outside the division and constituted the Flottans militärdistrikt ("Navy's Military District").

English name	Swedish name	Location	Active
1st Military District	1. militärdistriktet	Landskrona; Malmö; Helsingborg	1847–1863; 1863–1864; 1864–1867
2nd Military District	2. militärdistriktet	Mariefred; Stockholm; Linköping	1847–18?? 18??–1863; 1863–1867
3rd Military District	3. militärdistriktet	Karlstad; Alingsås; Töreboda	1847–1862; 1862–1864; 1864–1867
4th Military District	4. militärdistriktet	Stockholm	1847–1867
5th Military District	5. militärdistriktet	Gävle; Söderhamn; Stockholm; Gävle	1847–1856; 1856–1861; 1861–1866; 1866–1867

=== 1867–1889 ===
The 1867 subdivision was operational from 1 April of that year.

English name	Swedish name	Location	Active
1st Military District	1. militärdistriktet	Helsingborg; Kristianstad	1864–1887; 1887–1889
2nd Military District	2. militärdistriktet	Jönköping; Linköping; Eksjö	1867–1873; 1873–1888; 1888–1889
3rd Military District	3. militärdistriktet	Mariestad; Karlstad; Stockholm; Karlstad; Skövde	1867–1873; 1873–1878; 1878–1882; 1882–1885; 1885–1889
4th Military District	4. militärdistriktet	Stockholm	1867–1889
5th Military District	5. militärdistriktet	Gävle; Stockholm; Gävle	1866–1878; 1878–1888; 1888
Gotland Military Command (Note: Gotland Military Command was also the name of the VII Military District from 1966 to 2000.)	Gotlands militärbefäl	Visby	1873–1889

=== 1889–1893 ===
The 1889 subdivision was operational from 1 January of that year.

English name	Swedish name	Location	Active
1st Military District	1. militärdistriktet	Kristianstad; Helsingborg	1887–1888; 1888–1893
2nd Military District	2. militärdistriktet	Eksjö	1889–1893
3rd Military District	3. militärdistriktet	Skövde	1889–1893
4th Military District	4. militärdistriktet	Stockholm	1889–1893
5th Military District	5. militärdistriktet	Stockholm	1889–1893
6th Military District	6. militärdistriktet	Gävle	1889–1893
Gotland Military Command (Note: Gotland Military Command was also the name of the VII Military District from 1966 to 2000.)	Gotlands militärbefäl	Visby	1889–1893

=== 1893–1942 ===
Between 1893 and 1942, the military district concept was called army division.

=== 1942–1966 ===
From 1942, Sweden was divided into seven military districts (numbered I–VII). In connection with an organizational change in 1966, a name change was also implemented. The military districts took over the operational command, that is, the military district was responsible for the war planning in its district in the event of war.

English name	Swedish name	Location	Active
I Military District	I. militärområdet	Kristianstad	1942–1966
II Military District	II. militärområdet	Östersund	1942–1966
III Military District	III. militärområdet	Skövde	1942–1966
IV Military District	IV. militärområdet	Stockholm Strängnäs	1942–1963 1963–1966
V Military District	V. militärområdet	Stockholm Karlstad	1942–1942 1942–1966
VI Military District	VI. militärområdet	Boden	1942–1966
VII Military District	VII. militärområdet	Visby	1942–1966

=== 1966–1990s ===
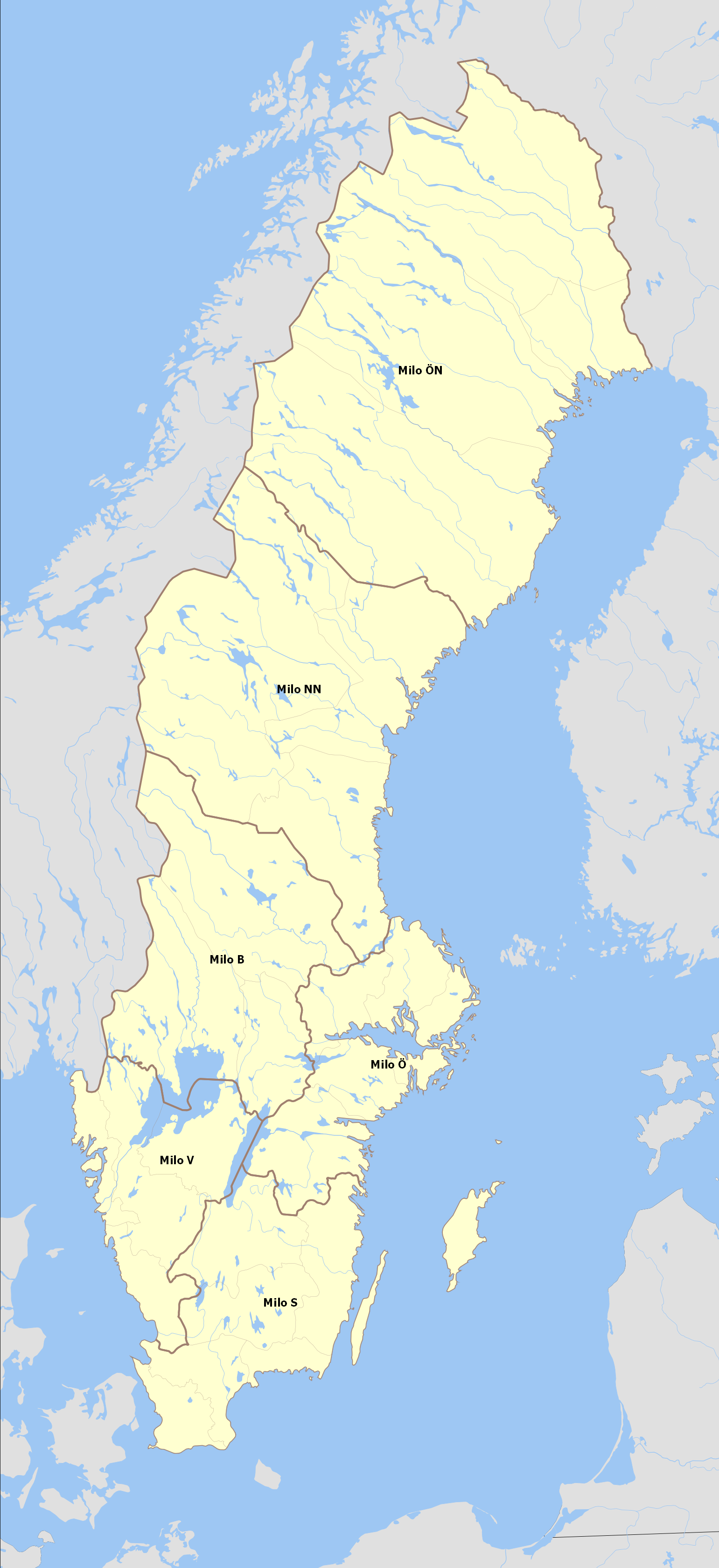
Map over military districts 1966–1990s.

In connection with an organizational change in 1966, a name change was carried out in the military districts. The military districts took over the operational command, that is, the military district was responsible for war planning in the district in the event of war. Furthermore, the number of military districts was reduced when the VII Military District, which included Gotland, amalgamated into a command within the Eastern Military District.

Designation	English name	Swedish name	Location	Active	Note
Milo S	Southern Military District	Södra militärområdet	Kristianstad	1966–2000	Previously the I Military District
Milo NN	Lower Norrland Military District	Nedre Norrlands militärområde	Östersund	1966–1993	Previously the II Military District
Milo V	Western Military District	Västra militärområdet	Skövde	1966–1993	Previously the III Military District
Milo Ö	Eastern Military District	Östra militärområdet	Strängnäs	1966–1991	Previously the IV Military District
Milo B	Bergslagen Military District	Bergslagens militärområde	Karlstad	1966–1991	Previously the V Military District
Milo ÖN	Upper Norrland Military District	Övre Norrlands militärområde	Boden	1966–1993	Previously the VI Military District
MKG	Gotland Military Command	Gotlands militärkommando	Visby	1966–2000	Previously the VII Military District; Incorporated into Milo Ö, but remains as a staff.

=== 1990s–2000 ===
The 1966 organization lasted until the years 1991 and 1993, when the six military districts were amalgamated and formed three districts and a command.

Designation	English name	Swedish name	Location	Active	Note
Milo S	Southern Military District	Södra militärområdet	Kristianstad	1966–2000	Milo V was incorporated in Milo S in 1993.
Milo M	Middle Military District	Mellersta militärområdet	Strängnäs	1991–2000	Formed by merging of Milo B and Milo Ö.
Milo N	Northern Military District	Norra militärområdet	Boden	1993–2000	Formed by merging of Milo NN and Milo ÖN.
MKG	Gotland Military Command	Gotlands militärkommando	Visby	1966–2000	Transferred to Milo M in 1991.

=== 2000–2005 ===
Through the Defence Act of 2000, the military districts were disbanded and replaced another military district organisation. The new military districts geographically corresponded to the old military districts, however, they did not have the same territorial and operational tasks. These tasks were transferred to the newly established Joint Forces Command (OPIL). The military districts instead became the lowest level where the commander was territorially responsible, instead of the former defence district. Their main task was territorial activities, training of Home Guard and voluntary staff, and operations, primarily within the framework of community support. Within each military district, military district groups (militärdistriktsgrupper) were organized, a total of 29, which in principle took over the old division of the defence district, which largely followed the Swedish county division. The districts were disbanded in 2005 after the Defence Act of 2005.

English name	Swedish name	Designation	Location	Active	Note
Southern Military District	Södra militärdistriktet	MD S	Gothenburg	2000–2005	Formerly Southern Military District (Milo S)
Central Military District	Mellersta militärdistriktet	MD M	Strängnäs	2000–2005	Formerly Middle Military District (Milo M)
Northern Military District	Norra militärdistriktet	MD N	Boden	2000–2005	Formerly Northern Military District (Milo N)
Gotland Military District	Gotlands militärdistrikt	MD G	Visby	2000–2004	Formerly Gotland Military Command (MKG)

== See also ==
- Military subdivisions of Sweden
- List of Swedish defence districts
