= Eskilstuna Airport =

Eskilstuna Airport Eskilstuna-Kjula flygplats

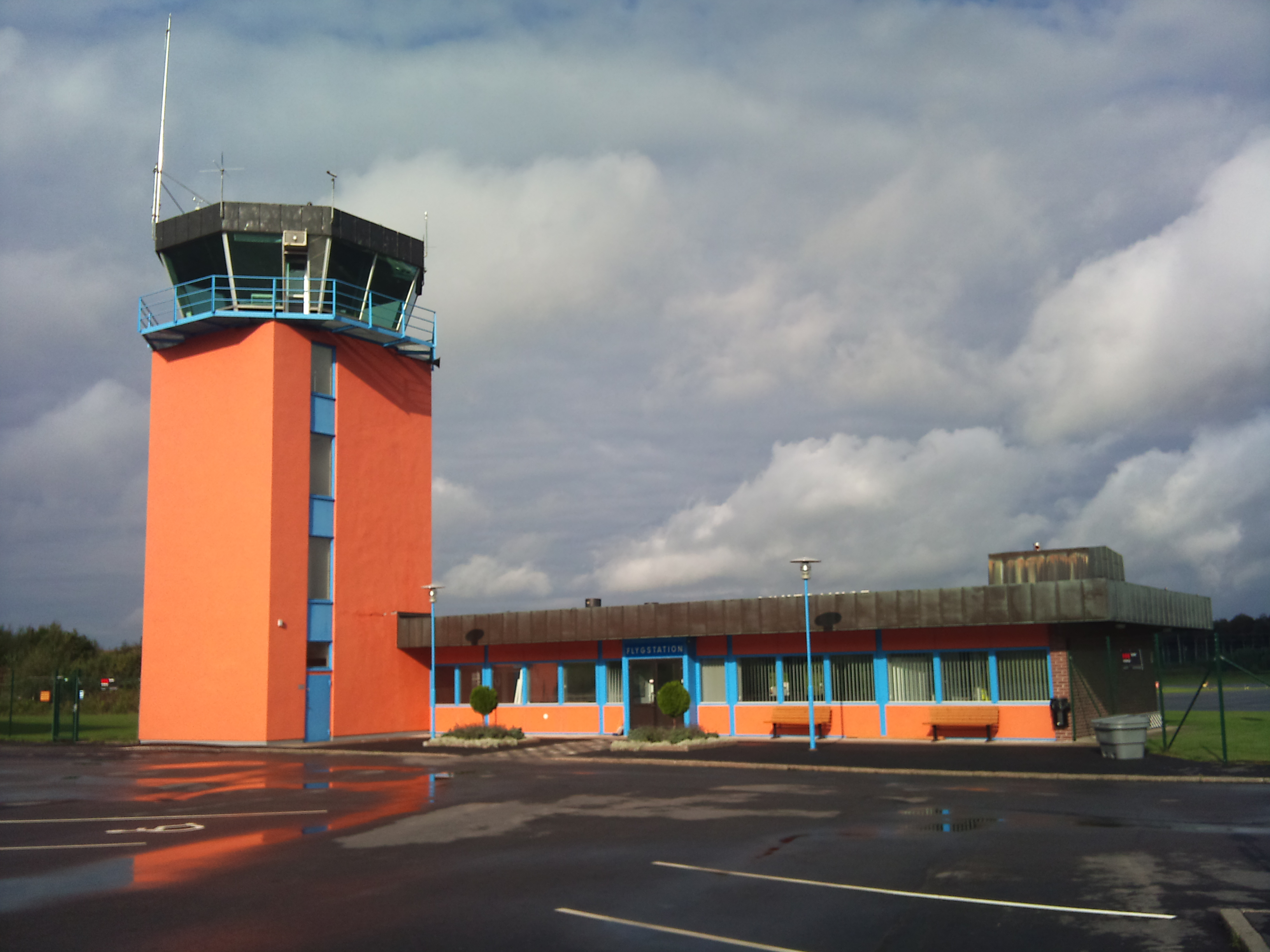
- IATA: EKT; ICAO: ESSU

Summary
- Owner: Eskilstuna city
- Location: Eskilstuna, Sweden
- Elevation AMSL: 139 ft (42 m)
- Coordinates: 59°21′0″N 16°42′30″E
- Website: https://www.eskilstunaflygplats.se/
- Interactive map of Eskilstuna Airport

Runways
| Direction | Length | | Surface |
| Direction | ft | m | Surface |
|---|---|---|---|
| 18/36 | 7,218 | 2,200 | asphalt |

Eskilstuna Airport is an airport in Eskilstuna, Sweden. It is located 13 km east of Eskilstuna and 97 km away from Stockholm.

== History ==
The airport's runway, measuring 2,176 meters in length, was originally constructed as the main runway for one of the Swedish Air Force's war air bases within the Base 60 system and was later adapted to the Base 90 system.

The runway was opened for military air traffic in 1963. From 1969 to 1972, it facilitated civil passenger traffic, including scheduled flights to Malmö and charter services to destinations such as Visby and the Canary Islands. Following the Defence Decision of 2004, it was determined that all military operations at the airfield would cease by December 31, 2005. Subsequently, Eskilstuna Municipality acquired the airport from the Swedish Fortifications Agency on December 31, 2007.

The Svealand railway line runs south of the airport's runway, providing opportunities for rapid transport on existing infrastructure in the event of future expansion. The airport currently serves taxi flights, air ambulance services, private aviation, and charter flights. Additionally, flight training activities are conducted in association with Kjula.
