= Middle Military District =

Former military district of Sweden

- Mellersta militärområdet
- Active: 1991–2000
- Country: Sweden
- Allegiance: Swedish Armed Forces
- Branch: Multi (Sea, Air and Land)
- Type: Military district
- Role: Operational, territorial and tactical operations
- Garrison/HQ: Strängnäs
- March: "I parad" (Trobäck) (Note: The march was adopted in 1994 and was established on 13 June 1996. It was used by the Central Military District from 2000 to 2005.)

Middle Military District (Swedish: Mellersta militärområdet, Milo M) was a Swedish military district, a command of the Swedish Armed Forces that had operational control over Middle Sweden, for most time of its existence corresponding to the area covered by the counties of Östergötland, Södermanland, Stockholm, Uppsala, Västmanland, Örebro, Värmland, Kopparberg (now Dalarna County) and Gävleborg. The headquarters of Milo M were located in Strängnäs.

== History ==
Milo M was created in 1991 when the number of military districts of Sweden was decreased to five, and as a consequence of that, the Eastern Military District (Milo Ö) was merged with Bergslagen Military District (Milo B) to create this new military district. In 1993, the number of military districts of Sweden was decreased to three, and as a consequence of that, the territory of Gävleborg County formerly part of Lower Norrland Military District (Milo NN), was merged into the military district. In 2000, these last three military districts were disbanded and the command for the whole of Sweden was placed at the Swedish Armed Forces Headquarters, in accordance with the Defence Act of 2000.

== Heraldry and traditions ==
=== Coat of arms ===
The coat of arms of the Middle Military District Staff 1991–2000. It was also used by the Central Military District Staff 2000–2005. Blazon: "Or, the provincial badge of Södermanland, a griffon segreant sable, armed and langued gules, on a chief azur three open crowns fesswise or. The shield surmounting an erect sword of the last colour."

=== Medals ===
In 2000, the Mellersta militärområdesstabens (MilostabM) minnesmedalj ("Middle Military District Staff (MilostabM) Commemorative Medal") in silver (MiloMSMM) of the 8th size was established. The medal ribbon is of yellow moiré with a black stripe on each side and a broad red stripe on the middle.

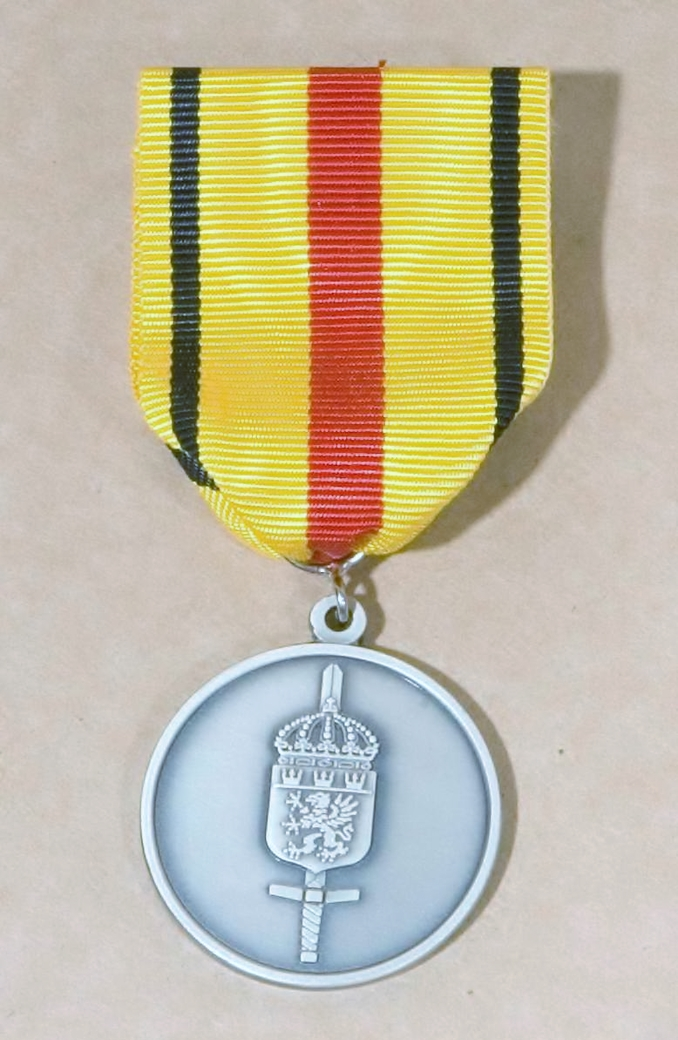
The commemorative medal

Ribbon bar

== Commanding officers ==
=== Military commanders ===
- 1991–1994: Torsten Engberg
- 1 July 1994 – 1998: Dick Börjesson
- 1998–2000: Percurt Green
- 2000–2000: Kjell Koserius

=== Chiefs of Staff ===
- 1991–1992: Bengt Anderberg
- 1992–1993: Svante Bergh
- 1994–1995: Lennart Rönnberg
- 1995–1997: Anders Lindström
- 1997–2000: Kjell Koserius

== Names, designations and locations ==
Name	Translation	From		To
Middle Military District	Mellersta Military District	1991-07-01	–	2000-06-30
Avvecklingsorganisation	Decommissioning Organisation	2000-07-01	–	2001-03-31
Designation		From		To
Milo M		1991-07-01	–	2000-06-30
Location		From		To
Strängnäs Garrison		1991-07-01	–	2001-03-31

== See also ==
- Military district (Sweden)
