= Överste av 1. graden =

Rank in the Swedish Army

- Country: Sweden
- Service branch: Army; Air Force; Amphibious Corps (from 2000); Coastal Artillery (until 2000)
- Abbreviation: Öv 1.gr
- Rank: Senior colonel
- NATO rank code: OF-5+
- Non-NATO rank: OF-6+
- Formation: 1972
- Abolished: 2000
- Next higher rank: Major general (1972–2000); Brigadier general (2000–)
- Next lower rank: Colonel
- Equivalent ranks: Kommendör av 1. graden

Överste av 1. graden (Note: Överste av 1. graden is literally translated as colonel of the 1st degree or colonel 1st class. Some sources translates it as Brigadier (British English), Air Commodore (British English, airforce) or Brigadier General (American English); a somewhat misleading translation given that the purpose of the introduction of the rank was that the Swedish government did not want to contribute to an increase in the number of generals in the Swedish Armed Forces. The rank is rather a senior colonel rank then a brigadier/brigadier general rank.) was a senior colonel rank of the Swedish Army, Swedish Air Force and Swedish Amphibious Corps, ranking below major general (1972–2000) and brigadier general (since 2000), and above colonel.

== History ==
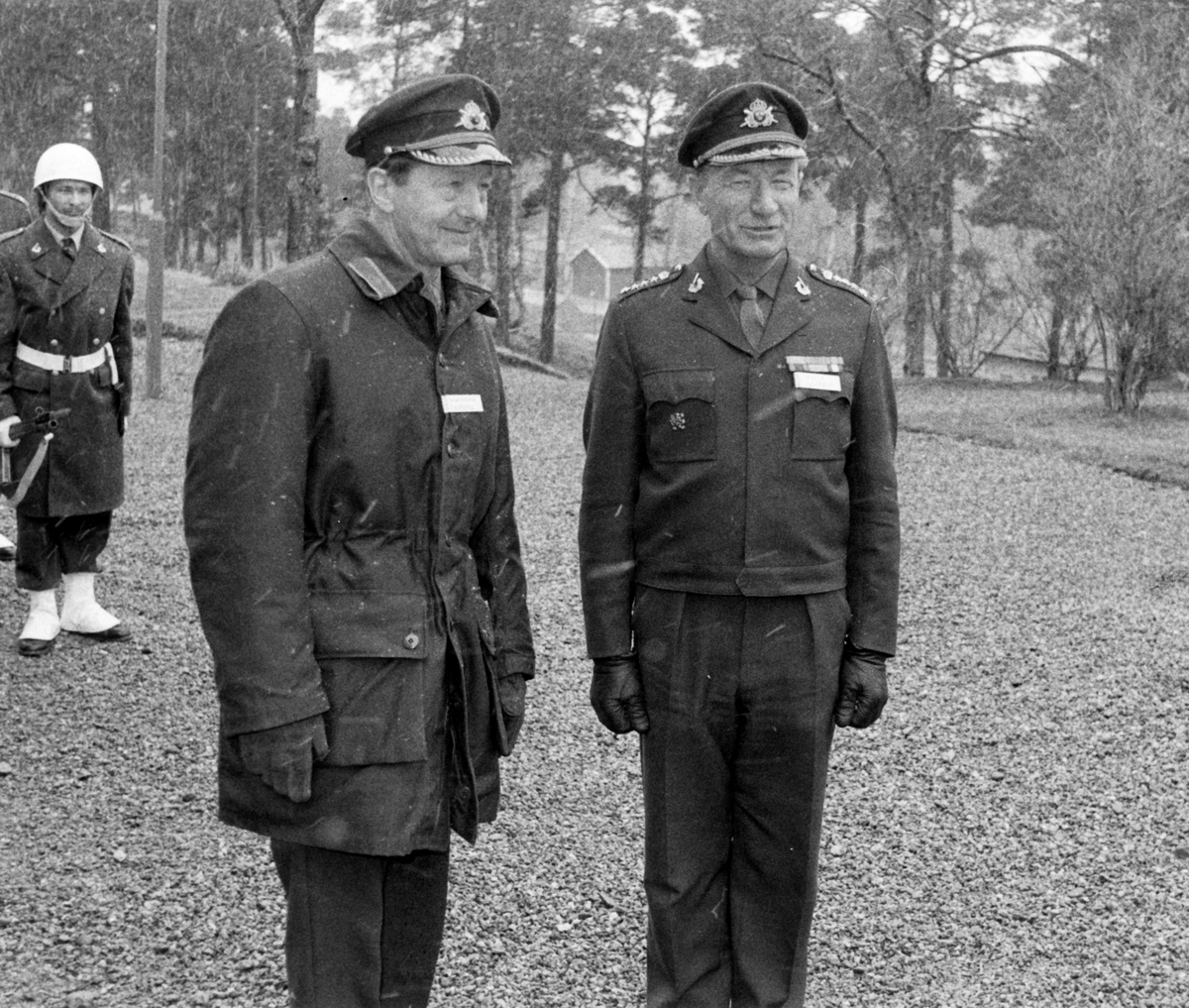
Two senior colonels in 1976: Stig Colliander, commander of P 10/Fo 43 and Per Björkman, armor inspector in the Army Staff.

In 1972, the so-called employment reform (tjänstställningsreformen) was implemented. In connection with the Swedish Armed Forces' increasing involvement in international operations with UN battalions and observers, it became increasingly clear that the Swedish service system did not quite correspond to what was common in other countries. A Swedish captain had basically the same training and service as a major in other countries' defense forces. In many cases, a Swedish colonel had tasks that in other armed forces were performed by brigadier generals. During the 1960s, this was solved many times by the Swedish officers being given a higher rank during their service abroad. The Supreme Commander suggested to the Swedish government that the Swedish service system should be changed, so that the captains would receive the rank of major and the majors would receive the rank of lieutenant colonel. He further proposed that a new general, brigadier general, be introduced. The government approved the Supreme Commander's proposal regarding captains and majors. No new general rank was introduced. The motivation for the government not following the Supreme Commander's proposal in this respect was that it did not want to contribute to an increase in the number of generals and admirals in the Swedish Armed Forces. However, the government decided to introduce the rank of överste av 1. graden (senior colonel) for the army and kommendör av 1. graden (senior captain) for the navy. The reform was implemented on 1 July 1972.

During the 1990s, the Swedish government raised the issue of introducing a rank for professional officers called brigadier general and rear admiral (lower half), respectively, and stated there, among other things, the following. For a few years, the Swedish Armed Forces had in various ways announced that they wished to change the current rank level system for professional officers. The idea was that the rank of överste 1. graden (senior colonel) and kommendör av 1. graden (senior captain) would be abolished and instead replaced with the rank of brigadier general and rear admiral (lower half). The reason for this was stated to be that then almost only Sweden did not have this rank. The increased international cooperation was thus considered to have been made more difficult. Denmark, Norway and Finland had recently introduced the brigadier general's rank. The government stated in the same bill that the issue should be prepared further before a position was taken on the proposal. In 1999, the government stated that the said rank should now be introduced and intended to make changes to the bill (1994:642) with instructions for the Swedish Armed Forces and the Officers Ordinance (1994:882) with effect from 1 July 2000.

The brigadier general rank was finally introduced in 2000 and replaced the old rank of överste av 1. graden. Anyone who, according to older regulations, held the rank of överste av 1. graden would continue to hold that rank until otherwise decided. Thus, the rank of överste av 1. graden was placed between the rank of brigadier general and the rank of colonel.

== Rank insignia ==
=== Collar patches ===
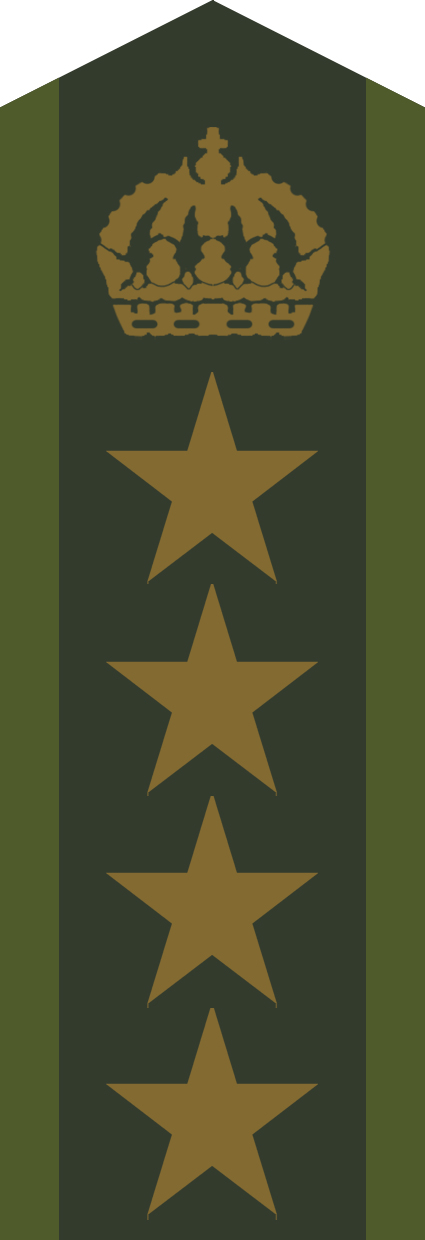
Collar patch m/58 on uniform m/58-m/59 and field uniform M90

=== Shoulder marks ===
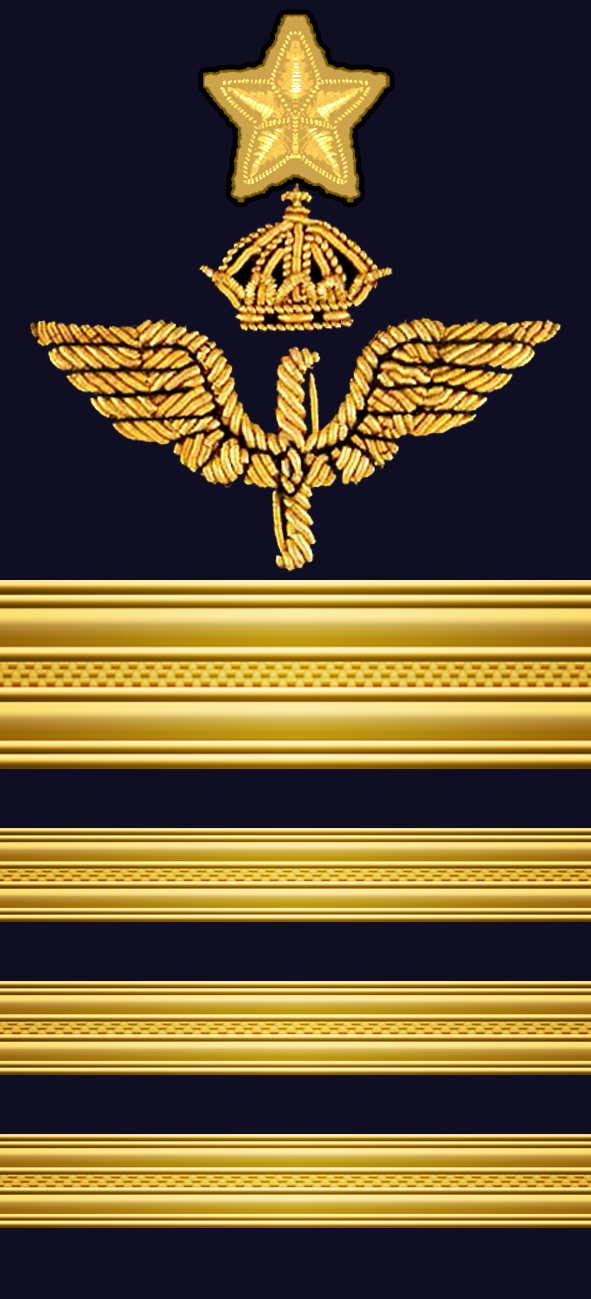
Shoulder mark
(Air Force)

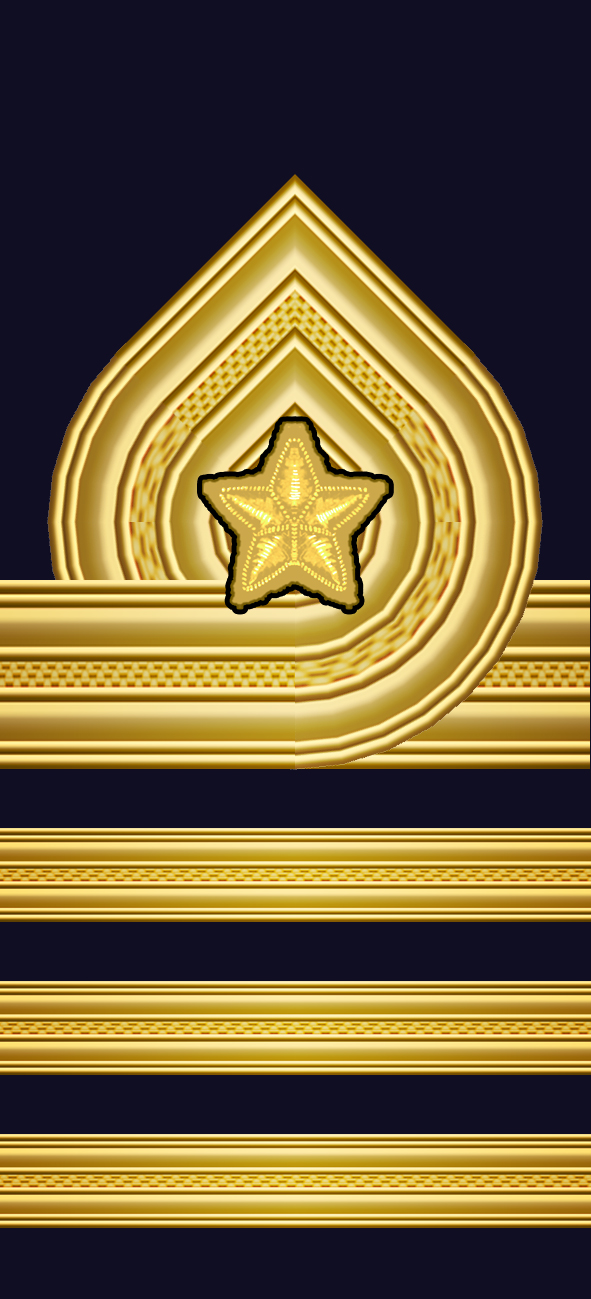
Shoulder mark (embroidered)
(Coastal Artillery/Amphibious Corps)

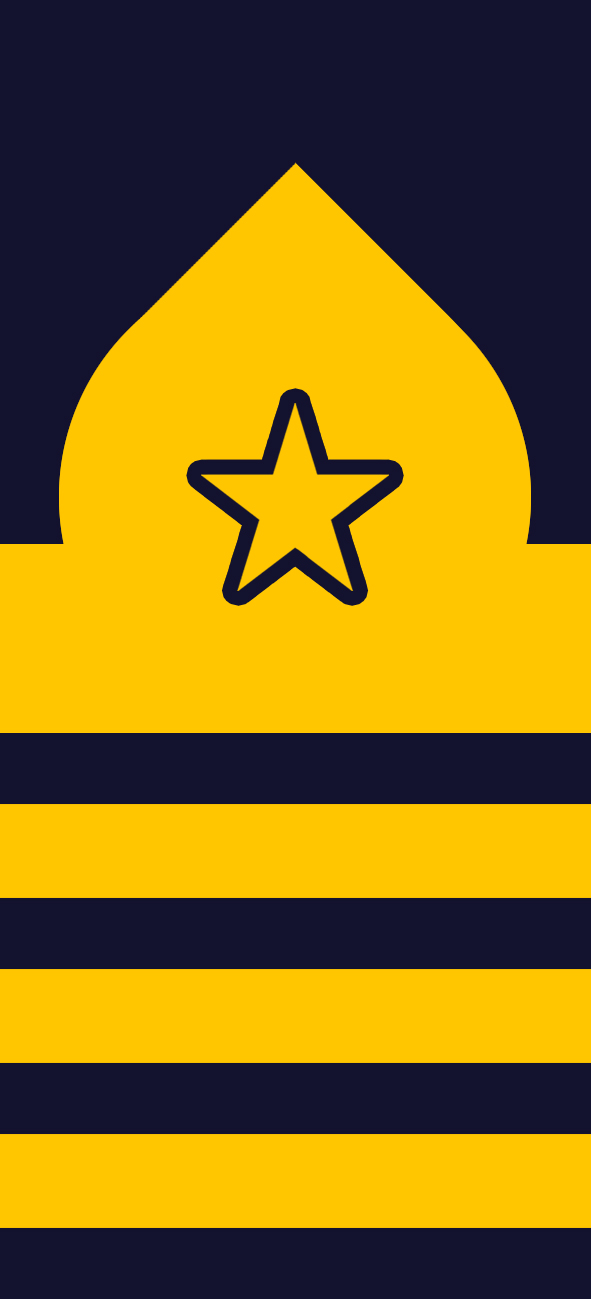
Shoulder mark (inwrought)
(Coastal Artillery/Amphibious Corps)

=== Sleeve insignias ===
==== Air Force ====
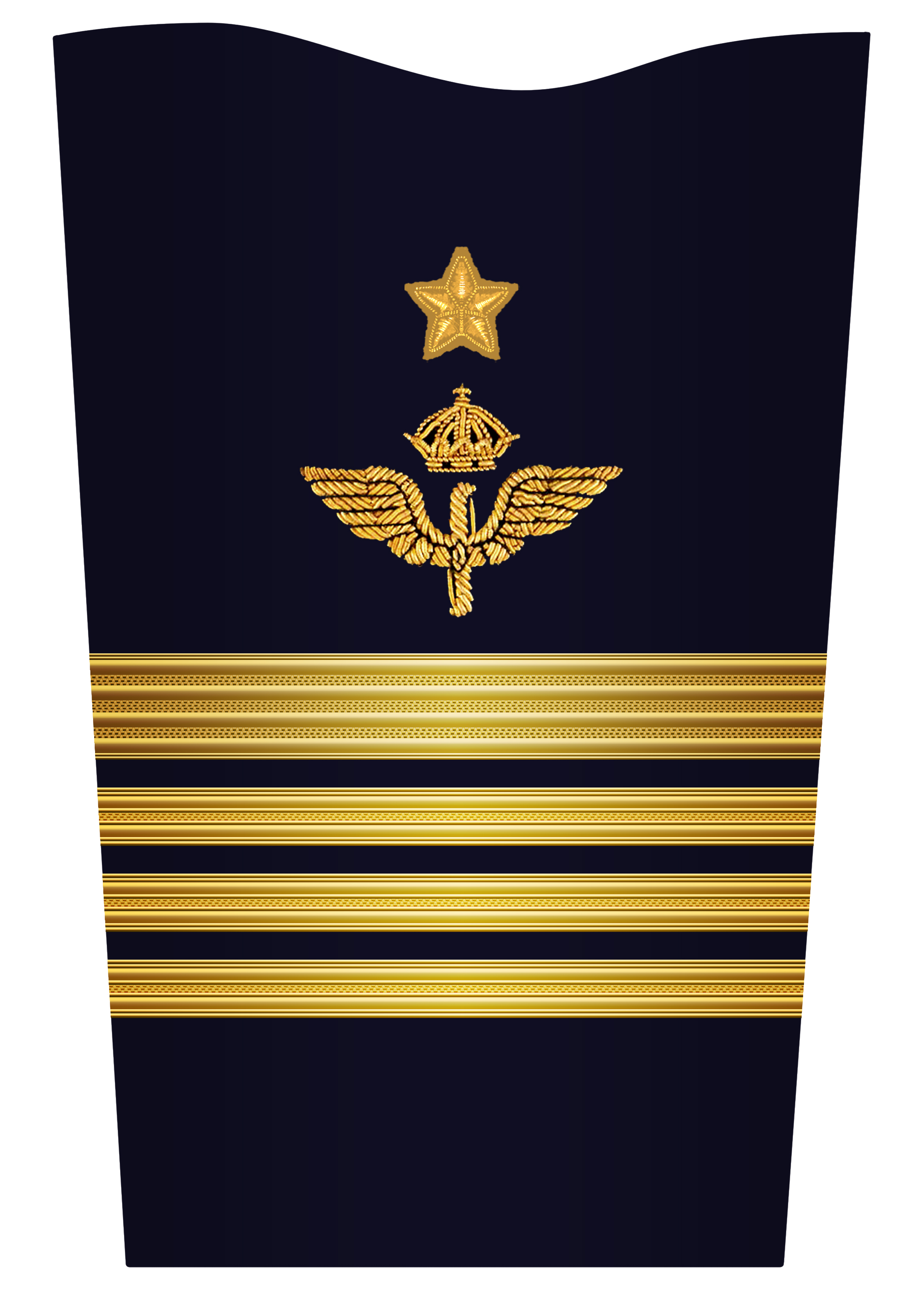
Mess jacket sleeve insignia

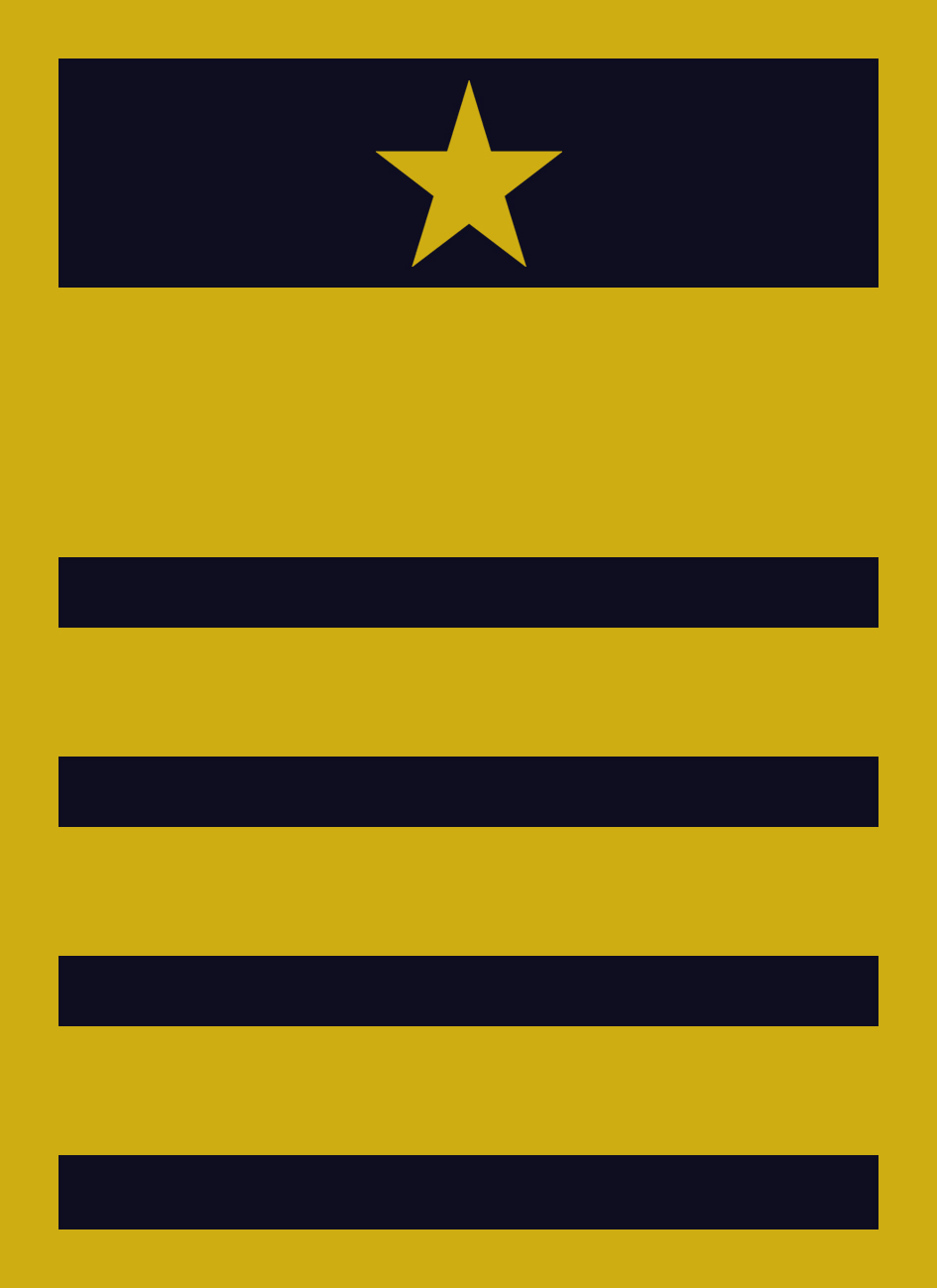
Flight suit sleeve insignia

==== Coastal Artillery/Amphibious Corps ====
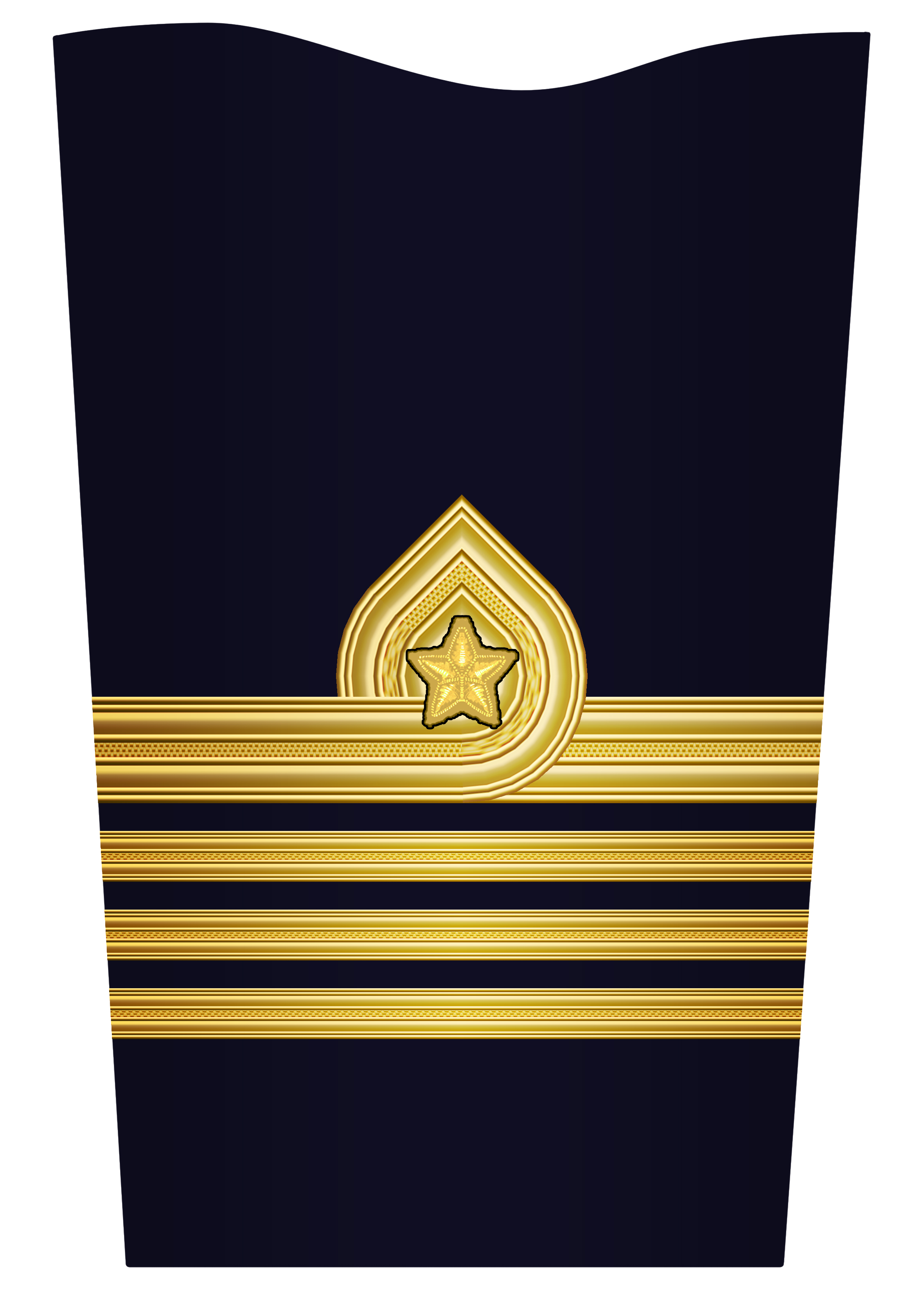
Sleeve insignia
