= Mats Nilsson (Swedish Air Force officer) =

Swedish Air Force officer (born 1956)

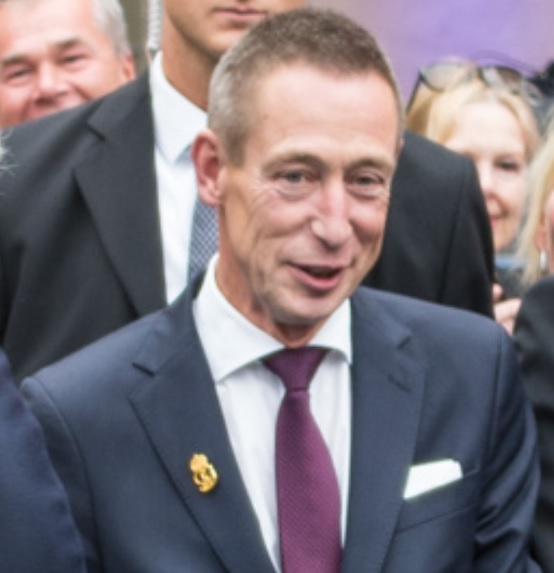
- Nilsson in 2013.
- Born: Mats Evald Nilsson; 30 December 1956 (age 69); Västerås, Sweden
- Military career
- Allegiance: Sweden
- Branch: Swedish Air Force
- Service years: 1979–2012
- Rank: Lieutenant General
- Commands: Uppland Wing; Inspector General of the Air Force; Air Force Tactical Command; Joint Forces Directorate; Chief of Defence Staff
- Conflicts: U 137
- Other work: First Marshal of the Court

Lieutenant General Mats Evald Nilsson (born 30 December 1956) is a Swedish Air Force officer. He served as Inspector General of the Air Force from 2000 to 2002, as head of the Joint Forces Directorate from 2002 to 2007 and as Chief of Defence Staff in 2007. Nilsson served as the First Marshal of the Court from 2012 to 2022.

== Early life ==
Nilsson was born in Västerås, Sweden and grew up in Lomma, Scania, having moved there with his parents when he was three years old. Nilsson started gliding when he was 15-year-old. Nilsson was also a talented high school student, and as such also an exchange student in the United States. At this time he was thinking of becoming a pediatrician or a chef. Back in Sweden, Nilsson passed studentexamen at Katedralskolan in Lund in 1976 and was supposed to do his military service in Karlskrona Coastal Artillery Regiment (KA 2) in Karlskrona but instead, two weeks after graduation from Katedralskolan, he enrolled at the Swedish Air Force Flying School in Ljungbyhed.

== Career ==
After becoming an officer at an official exam at Uppland Wing (F 16), Nilsson learned to fly the Saab 37 Viggen at Hälsinge Wing (F 15) in Söderhamn, before transferring in 1979 to Blekinge Wing (F 17) near Ronneby. There he served as a Tactical Reconnaissance Pilot and flew Saab 37 Viggen as a lieutenant. Nilsson was stationed in Blekinge when the Soviet submarine U 137 ran aground on 27 October 1981 southeast of Karlskrona.

In 1982, Nilsson transferred to Linköping to become a test pilot at Defence Materiel Administration's Swedish Center for Experimental Research (Försökscentralen, FC) at Malmen Airbase. He then completed the General Course at the Swedish Armed Forces Staff College from 1983 to 1984 and the young captain's success was rewarded with pilot training at the United States Naval Test Pilot School at the Naval Air Station Patuxent River in Maryland from 1984 to 1985, where he finished first in his class. During his career, Nilsson has tested 35 different aircraft types, Swedish and foreign, including, among others F-16 Fighting Falcon, F/A-18 Hornet and the Sukhoi Su-30. He left Linköping in 1991 after nine years and then completed the Higher Course at the Swedish Armed Forces Staff College from 1991 to 1993. Nilsson then served in the Air Staff's Coordination Department in Stockholm from 1993 to 1995 and as chief of flight operations at Uppland Wing (F 16) near Uppsala from 1995 to 1997 as well as commanding officer of the wing from 1997 to 1999. In addition to his regular positions, he has also served as aide-de-camp to King Carl XVI Gustaf.

In early 2000, Nilsson served as head of the Planning Department of the Joint Operations Command (Operationsledningen, OPL) in the Swedish Armed Forces Headquarters in Stockholm. Nilsson was appointed Inspector General of the Air Force on 30 June 2000 and head of the Air Force Tactical Command. As the air force chief, Nilsson in 2001 launched an open dispute with the Social Democrats regarding the disbandments of air force wings. He left the position of Inspector General of the Air Force on 1 December 2002 and took charge of the Joint Forces Directorate (Krigsförbandsledningen) in the Swedish Armed Forces Headquarters. He was at the same time promoted to lieutenant general. Nilsson later served as the Chief of Training & Development (Produktionschef) and as Chief of Defence Staff where he was replaced by Sverker Göranson on 1 November 2007. On 18 October 2007, Nilsson was appointed head of the Unit for Military Defense in the Ministry of Defence, the unit which prepares cases and questions on planning, managing and monitoring the military defense's tasks, ability, and operations. Nilsson was appointed First Marshal of the Court on 1 January 2012, in charge of planning the Swedish royal family's official program and representation.

== Personal life ==
In 1987, Nilsson married Anna, a nurse, and together they have two children.

== Dates of rank ==
Nilsson's dates of rank:

- 1979 – Lieutenant
- 1982 – Captain
- 1987 – Major
- 1994 – Lieutenant Colonel with special position
- 1995 – Colonel
- 1997 – Brigadier General
- 2000 – Major General
- 2002 – Lieutenant General

== Awards and decorations ==
=== Swedish ===
- (Sweden) H. M. The King's Medal, 12th size gold (silver-gilt) medal worn around the neck on the Order of the Seraphim ribbon (2017)

=== Foreign ===
- Grand Cross of the Order of the White Rose of Finland (3 March 2015)
- (Italy) 1st Class / Knight Grand Cross of the Order of Merit of the Italian Republic (14 January 2019)
- (Iceland) Grand Cross of the Order of the Falcon (17 January 2018)
- (Iceland) Grand Knight's Cross of the Order of the Falcon (24 November 1998)

Military offices
Preceded by Jan Jonsson	Inspector General of the Air Force; 2000–2002	Succeeded by Jan Andersson
Preceded by Lennart Brodin	Air Force Tactical Command; 2000–2002	Succeeded by Lennart Pettersson
Preceded by Folke Rehnström	Joint Forces Directorate (Krigsförbandsledningen); 2002–2005	Succeeded by None
Preceded by None	Chief of Defence Staff; 1 April 2007–30 October 2007	Succeeded by Sverker Göranson
Court offices
Preceded by Lars-Hjalmar Wide	First Marshal of the Court; 2012–2022	Succeeded by Göran Lithell
