= Carl-Johan Edström =

Swedish Air Force officer

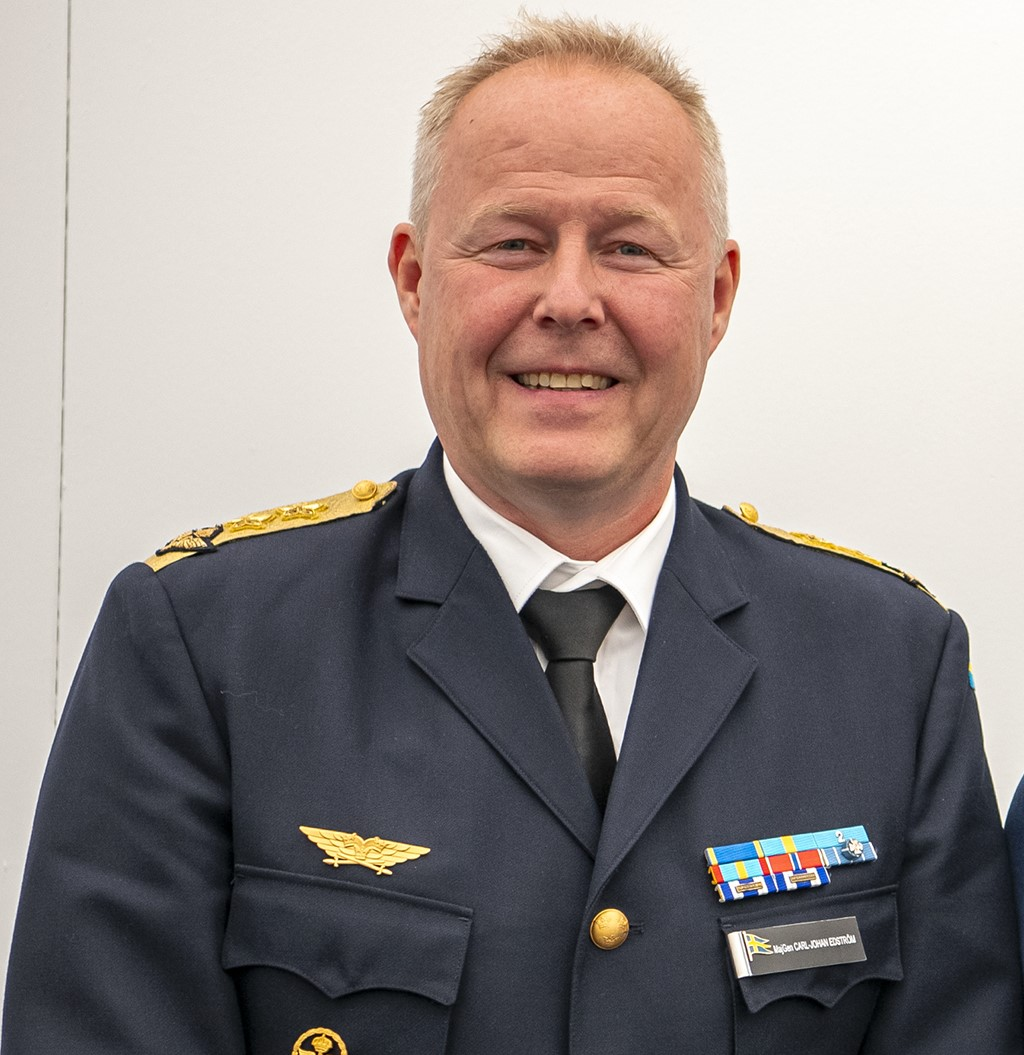
- Edström in 2022
- Born: 21 May 1967 (age 59); Nora, Sweden
- Military career
- Allegiance: Sweden
- Branch: Swedish Air Force
- Service years: 1989–present
- Rank: Lieutenant general
- Nickname: "Klute" (call sign)
- Commands: Norrbotten Wing; Air Component Command; Deputy Chief of Air Force; Chief of Air Force; Chief of Joint Operations; Commandant General in Stockholm; Chief of the Defence Staff
- Conflicts: Libyan Civil War (Operation Unified Protector); Resolute Support Mission (TAAC – Air)

Lieutenant General Carl-Johan Edström (born 21 May 1967) is a Swedish Air Force officer. He currently serves as Chief of the Defence Staff since 1 October 2024. Prior to that Edström served as Chief of Joint Operations from 2023 to 2024, and Chief of Air Force from 2019 to 2022.

== Early life ==
Edström was born on 21 May 1967 in Nora, Sweden, and was raised in Klutmark, a village 10 kilometers west of Skellefteå. Carl-Johan Edström is twin brother of Swedish Air Force colonel Carl-Fredrik Edström. Carl-Johan Edström started his military career as platoon leader in the Norrland Brigade in Västerbotten Regiment (I 20) in Umeå in 1988.

== Career ==
Edström trained as a pilot at the Swedish Air Force Flying School in Ljungbyhed and was commissioned as an officer in 1989 with the rank of second lieutenant in Norrbotten Wing. There he was promoted to lieutenant in 1995 and to captain in 1998. In 1996, Edström served as squad leader in the 212th Fighter Squadron (212. stridsflygdivisionen). During the Swedish flight operation over Libya in 2011, he was operations commander for the Swedish flight contingent FL02, part of the Operation Unified Protector. In Afghanistan, he served as senior adviser and planning manager for Train Advise Assist Command – Air (TAAC – Air). Edström served as a staff officer in the Policy and Plans Department in the Defence Staff (Ledningsstabens inriktningsavdelning, LEDS INRI) until he on 16 January 2015 took command as wing commander of Norrbotten Wing and commander of Luleå Garrison.

In addition to Swedish officer training, in 2014 he received a master's degree in strategy from the Air War College in the USA. He attended a Higher Management Course at the Swedish Defence University in 2015 and at Solbacka in 2016 as well the Common Security and Defence Policy High Level Course at the European Security and Defence College in Brussels from 2016 to 2017. From the re-establishment of the Air Staff on 1 January 2019, Edström served as Deputy Chief of Air Force until 4 September 2019 when he was appointed Chief of Air Force, taking office on 1 October 2019. He was promoted to major general at the same date.

On 30 June 2022, the Swedish government appointed Edström lieutenant general and chief of the new Joint Operations Unit from 1 January 2023, succeeding Lieutenant General Michael Claesson as Chief of Joint Operations. From 15 December 2022 to 31 December 2022, Edström was placed at the disposal of the Chief of Joint Operations. On 1 October 2024, he succeeded Lieutenant General Michael Claesson as Chief of the Defence Staff.

== Personal life ==
Edström is married to Ulrika and they have two sons, Gustav and Oscar.

== Dates of rank ==
- 1989 – Second lieutenant
- 1995 – Lieutenant
- 1998 – Captain
- 2001 – Major
- 2006 – Lieutenant colonel
- 16 January 2015 – Colonel
- 1 October 2018 – Brigadier general
- 1 October 2019 – Major general
- 1 January 2023 – Lieutenant general

== Awards and decorations ==
=== Swedish ===
- (Sweden) For Zealous and Devoted Service of the Realm
- (Sweden) Swedish Armed Forces Conscript Medal
- (Sweden) Swedish Armed Forces International Service Medal
- (Sweden) Home Guard Silver Medal (5 September 2022)
- (Sweden) Swedish Air Force Volunteers Association Merit Badge
- (Sweden) Norrbotten Wing Medal of Merit (Norrbottens flygflottiljs (F 21) förtjänstmedalj, NorrbffljGM)

=== Foreign ===
- (Brazil) Grand Officer of the Order of Aeronautical Merit (22 October 2020)
- (United States) Bronze Star Medal (24 October 2019)
- NATO Non-Article 5 medal for Operation Unified Protector (2011)
- NATO Non-Article 5 medal for Operation Resolute Support (2018)

Military offices
Preceded by Fredrik Bergman	Norrbotten Wing; 2015–2018	Succeeded by Claes Isoz
Preceded by Gabor Nagy	Air Component Command; 2018–2019	Succeeded by None
Preceded by None	Deputy Chief of Air Force; 2019–2019	Succeeded by Anders Persson
Preceded by Mats Helgesson	Chief of Air Force; 2019–2022	Succeeded by Jonas Wikman
Preceded by Michael Claesson	Chief of Joint Operations; 2023–2024	Succeeded by Ewa Skoog Haslum
Preceded by Michael Claesson	Commandant General in Stockholm; 2024–present	Succeeded by Incumbent
Preceded by Michael Claesson	Chief of the Defence Staff; 2024–present	Succeeded by Incumbent
