= Mats Helgesson =

Swedish Air Force officer

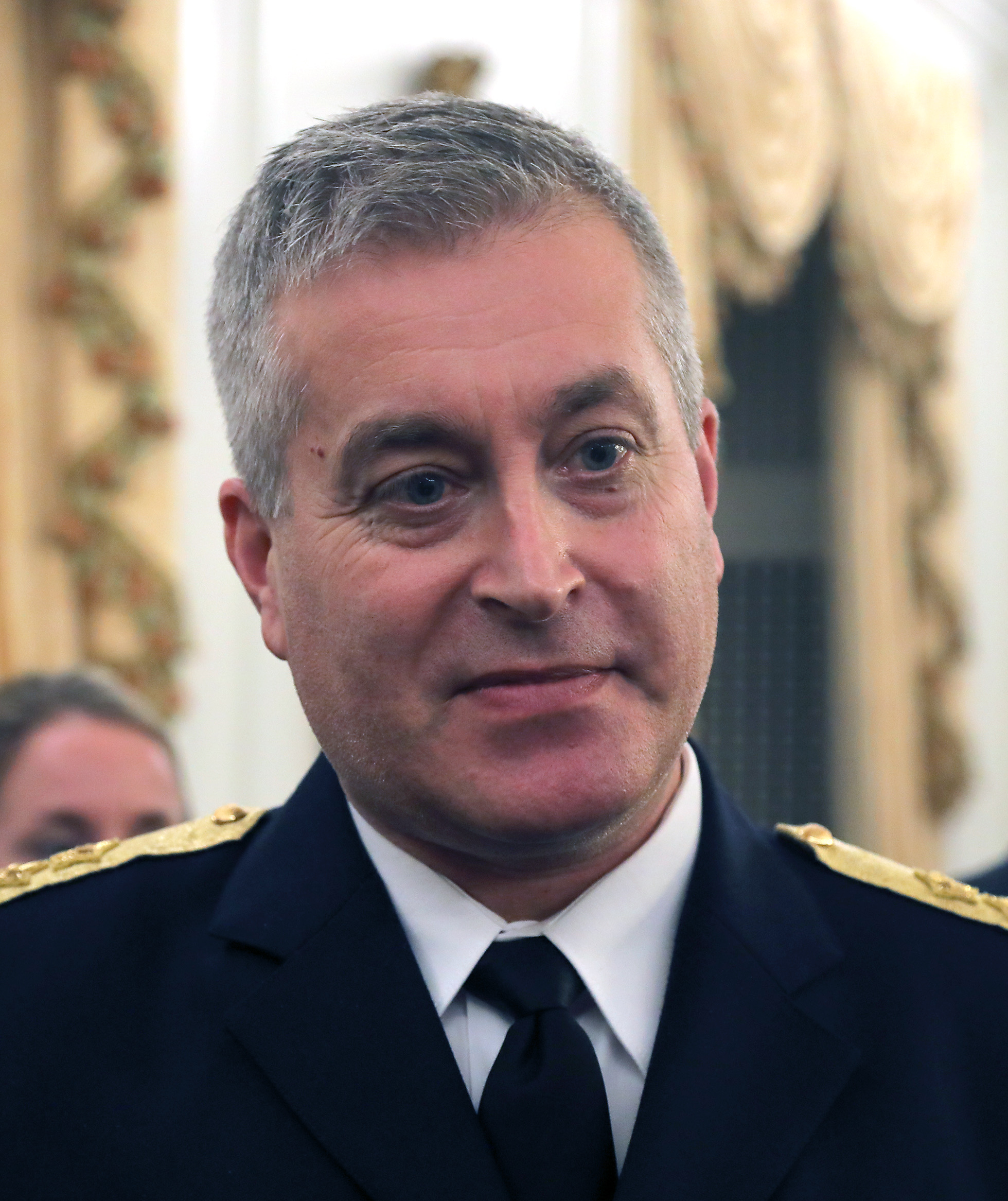
- Helgesson in uniform, 2018
- Born: Mats Eric Helgesson; 7 May 1964 (age 62); Gothenburg, Sweden
- Military career
- Allegiance: Sweden
- Branch: Swedish Air Force
- Service years: 1988–2019
- Rank: Major general
- Nickname: "Boss" (call sign)
- Commands: Blekinge Wing; Chief of Air Force
- Conflicts: War in Afghanistan

Major General Mats Eric Helgesson (born 7 May 1964) is a retired Swedish Air Force officer. He served as commanding officer of the Blekinge Wing and as Chief of Air Force from 2015 to 2019.

== Early life ==
Helgesson was born on 7 May 1964 in Lundby Parish, Gothenburg, Sweden. He did his military service in Norrland Dragoon Regiment (K 4) in Arvidsjaur between 1983 and 1985 where he also became a reserve officer. Helgesson then trained as a pilot at the Swedish Air Force Flying School in Ljungbyhed from 1985 to 1987.

== Career ==
Helgesson was commissioned as an officer at the Hälsinge Wing (F 15) in 1988 with the rank of second lieutenant. He served at F 15 between 1987 and 1996, flying Saab 105, AJS 37 Viggen and Saab JAS 39 Gripen totaling 2,100 flight hours. During this time, Helgesson was promoted to captain there in 1992 and to major in 1995. During this time, Helgesson also attended the Basic Course at Flygvapnets Uppsalaskolor in Uppsala in 1990 and the Advanced Course in 1992, as well as the Staff Course at the Swedish National Defence College from 1994 to 1995. He then attended the Advanched Command Course at the Swedish National Defence College from 1996 to 1998. Helgesson served as squadron commander at Skaraborg Wing (F 7) from 1998 to 2002, being promoted to lieutenant colonel in 1999. He then served as instructor at the Air Combat Training School from 2002 to 2004.

Helgesson then served as head of Flight Operations in the Training & Procurement Staff (Air Force) at the Swedish Armed Forces Headquarters in Stockholm from 2004 to 2007 then he was promoted to colonel and head of Air Operations. Also in 2007, Helgesson attended the Advanced Strategic Command Course at the Swedish National Defence College. In 2009, he attended the Swedish Civil Contingencies Agency's National and International Crisis Management Course in Stockholm and was appointed wing and air base commander of F 17. Between 2010 and 2011, he was assigned to the ISAF Joint Command in Kabul, Afghanistan. In 2012, Helgesson attended the Civil/Military Senior Command Course at Solbacka and was appointed as head of J 0 at the Swedish Joint Force Command's (Insatsstaben) Development Department at the Swedish Armed Forces Headquarters. In 2013, he was promoted to brigadier general and appointed head of Test and Evaluation (T&E) at the Defence Materiel Administration. Helgesson was appointed Chief of Air Force and was promoted to major general on 17 September 2015 and took office on 1 October 2015. On 1 October 2019, Helgesson retired and became a reserve officer. He was succeeded as Chief of Air Force by Carl-Johan Edström.

== Personal life ==
Helgesson is married and has three children.

== Dates of rank ==
- 1987 – Second lieutenant
- 1990 – Lieutenant
- 1992 – Captain
- 1995 – Major
- 1999 – Lieutenant colonel
- 2007 – Colonel
- 2013 – Brigadier general
- 2015 – Major general

== Awards and decorations ==
=== Swedish ===
- (Sweden) For Zealous and Devoted Service of the Realm
- (Sweden) Swedish Armed Forces Conscript Medal
- (Sweden) Swedish Armed Forces International Service Medal
- (Sweden) Swedish Air Force Volunteers Association Medal of Merit
- (Sweden) Swedish Air Force Volunteers Association Merit Badge
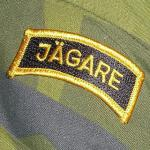
- (Sweden) K 4 Ranger Tab

=== Foreign ===
- (Brazil) Grand Officer of the Order of Aeronautical Merit (13 October 2016)
- NATO's ISAF Medal

== Honours ==
- Member of the Royal Swedish Academy of War Sciences (2018)

Military offices
Preceded by Micael Bydén	Chief of Air Force; 2015–2019	Succeeded by Carl-Johan Edström
