= Jan Jonsson (Swedish Air Force officer) =

Swedish Air Force officer (1952–2021)

- Born: Jan Bertil Gustav Johnsson; 22 September 1952; Bräcke, Sweden
- Died: 11 November 2021 (aged 69); Linköping, Sweden
- Military career
- Allegiance: Sweden
- Branch: Swedish Air Force
- Service years: 1970–2007
- Rank: Lieutenant General
- Nickname: Pinnen
- Commands: Air Force Tactical Center; Southern Air Command; Inspector General of the Air Force; Joint Forces Command; Chief of Joint Operations; Commandant General in Stockholm

Lieutenant General Jan Bertil Gustav Jonsson (Note: Johnsson in the Population registration in Sweden.) (22 September 1952 – 11 November 2021) was a senior Swedish Air Force officer. Jonsson served as Inspector General of the Air Force from 1998 to 2000, as head of the Joint Forces Command from 2000 to 2007 as well as the Commandant General in Stockholm from 2006 to 2007.

== Early life ==
Jonsson was born on 22 September 1952 in Bräcke, Sweden, the son of captain Bertil Jonsson and his wife Yvonne (née Ölund). He was gliding as a 15-year-old in Halmstad and enrolled at the Swedish Air Force Flying School in Ljungbyhed in 1970.

== Career ==
=== Military career ===
Jonsson served as sergeant pilot (fältflygare) and was assigned to Skaraborg Wing (F 7) from 1971 to 1978. Jonsson was promoted to second lieutenant in 1975 during his time at the Swedish Armed Forces School for Secondary Education in Uppsala. Jonsson then attended the Royal Swedish Air Force Academy (Flygvapnets krigsskola, F 20), also in Uppsala, from 1976 to 1978. At graduation, Jonsson was awarded the Chief of the Air Force's honorary gift as best student and F 20's sports shield for best athletic performance. Jonsson was assigned to Hälsinge Wing (F 15) from 1978 to 1986 and served as a sergeant pilot flying Saab 32 Lansen and Saab 37 Viggen. At Hälsinge Wing, Jonsson later became squadron commander of the 151st Attack Aircraft Squadron (151. attackflygdivisionen). Jonsson was assigned to the Air Staff's JAS Department from 1987 to 1989.

Jonsson was head of the tactical testing of Saab JAS 39 Gripen and was the head of the Air Force Tactical Center in Linköping from 1994 to 1997. He then served as commanding officer of the Southern Air Command from 1997 to 1998. Jonsson was then appointed Inspector General of the Air Force and head of the Air Force Center on 1 July 1998. He left the post in 2000 when he was appointed head of the Joint Forces Command (OPIL). On 18 December 2003 his appointment was prolonged. On 1 September 2004, Tony Stigsson succeeded Jonsson. Jonsson then became available to the Supreme Commander for special assignments. From 2005 to 2007, he served as commander of the Insatsprocessen (which in 2007 was renamed Joint Forces Command (Note: Not to be confused with the Joint Forces Command which existed from 2000 to 2005.)) at the Swedish Armed Forces Headquarters. The Chief of Joint Operations was created in 2007 and Jonsson served in this position until 31 October 2007 when he left his position at his own request.

=== Other work ===
Jonsson was a board member of the Civil Aviation Administration from 1999. He was a consultant of Hägglunds through the Svennerstål & Partners lobby company throughout 2008 and early 2009. In 2009 he was appointed head of the Norrköping Fire Department and Linköping Rescue Service.

== Personal life ==
In 1983, Jonsson married Anneli Viitanen (born 1956), the daughter of Arto and Yvonne Viitanen. They had three sons; Richard, Patrik and Christoffer.

== Death ==
Jonsson died at the age of 69 after a long illness. He was living in Linköping at the time of his death. The funeral service was held at Vreta Kloster Church northwest of Linköping on 9 December 2021.

== Dates of rank ==
- 1975 – Second lieutenant
- 19?? – Lieutenant
- 19?? – Captain
- 19?? – Major
- 19?? – Lieutenant colonel
- 19?? – Colonel
- 19?? – Senior colonel
- 1998 – Major general
- 2000 – Lieutenant general

== Footnotes ==
Military offices
Preceded by None	Air Force Tactical Center; 1994–1997	Succeeded by Anders Johansson
Preceded by Arne Hansson	Southern Air Command; 1997–1998	Succeeded by Robert Palmgren
Preceded by Kent Harrskog	Inspector General of the Air Force; 1998–2000	Succeeded by Mats Nilsson
Preceded by None	Air Force Center; 1998–2000	Succeeded by None
Preceded by None	Joint Forces Command; 2000–2004	Succeeded by Tony Stigsson
Preceded by None	Insatsprocessen; 2005–2007	Succeeded by None
Preceded by None	Chief of Joint Operations; 1 April 2007–31 October 2007	Succeeded by Anders Lindström
Preceded by Bo Waldemarsson	Commandant General in Stockholm; 2006–2007	Succeeded by Anders Lindström
