= Owe Wagermark =

Swedish Air Force senior colonel

- Born: Rolf Nils Ove Wagermark; 23 September 1951 (age 75); Stockholm, Sweden
- Military career
- Allegiance: Sweden
- Branch: Swedish Air Force
- Service years: 1973–2001
- Rank: Senior colonel
- Commands: Chief of Information; Deputy Inspector of the Air Force; Deputy Chief of the Air Component Command

Senior Colonel Rolf Nils Ove (Owe) Wagermark (born 23 September 1951) is a retired Swedish Air Force officer. Wagermark commenced his military journey in the Swedish Air Force, starting at Roslagen Air Corps. Graduating from the Royal Swedish Air Force Academy in 1973, he served in various capacities, including Tactical and Air Defence Control System units. Noteworthy achievements include ranking top in advanced courses at both the French military schools, École militaire and École supérieure de guerre interarmées, marking the first time a Swedish officer claimed the top position in France. Wagermark served as ADC to Prince Bertil, Duke of Halland, and held significant roles in recruitment and information management within the Swedish Armed Forces. He served as Deputy Inspector of the Air Force from 1998 to 2000.

Transitioning from the military, Wagermark assumed roles in the private sector, notably with AT&T Nordics AB. He later served in senior positions within Saab AB, including chief of staff and senior adviser to the CEO. Currently, he holds the position of special adviser to the president and CEO of Saab AB within the CEO Office, alongside serving as a board member of the Swedish Indian Business Council (SIBC).

== Early life ==
Wagermark was born on 23 September 1951 in German Saint Gertrude Parish in the City of Stockholm. In 1967, during high school in Gävle, Wagermark and a classmate each won a trip to the Soviet Union as a prize for the best essays in an annual competition about the Soviet Union, organized by the Sweden-Soviet Union Association. Between 23 July and 13 August 1969, he participated as a flight cadet in the International Air Cadet Exchange in the United States. Wagermark passed gymnasieexamen in 1970.

== Career ==
=== Military career ===
Wagermark began his career in the Swedish Air Force at the now-defunct Roslagen Air Corps. He graduated from the Royal Swedish Air Force Academy (Flygvapnets krigsskola, F 20) in 1973 and was appointed lieutenant at Norrbotten Wing in Luleå the same year, where he served in the Tactical (Fighting Command) and Air Defence Control System unit from 1973 to 1977, promoted to captain in 1975. Wagermark was the course director for the Air Force Cadet and Aspirant School for the Ground Program (Flygvapnets kadett- och aspirantskola för marklinjen, KAS/M) and also served as chief of staff at the Air Force Södertörn Schools (Flygvapnets Södertörnsskolor) from 1977 to 1980. He attended the General Course on the Air Program at the Swedish Armed Forces Staff College from 1979 to 1980 and the Officer Course at the Swedish Parachute Ranger School in 1981, and served in the Air Staff from 1980 to 1982. He was promoted to major in 1983.

In 1983, Wagermark emerged as the top student, competing against 57 peers, in the advanced course at the French military school, École militaire, in Paris. He was congratulated by France's Defense Minister, Charles Hernu. Wagermark arrived in Paris from the Swedish Armed Forces Staff College's advanced course, where he also ranked first. The following year, he graduated as the top student among 77 peers from 33 countries at the French War College, École supérieure de guerre interarmées, in Paris, after nearly two years of study. This marked the first time a Swedish officer had achieved the top position in France.

Wagermark served as ADC to Prince Bertil, Duke of Halland between 1984 and 1997. He served as the head of the Recruitment Section in the Selection Commission of the Air Staff from 1984 to 1986. He attended the Air Force Advanced Staff Course (Högre stabskurs 1) at the Swedish Armed Forces Staff College from 1986 to 1987, where he was awarded a jeton for being the top student in the Air Force Staff Course. Wagermark served as a staff officer and section chief in the Operations Command of the Defence Staff from 1987 to 1989. In 1988, he completed the Orientation Course at the Swedish National Defence College and was promoted to lieutenant colonel the same year.

He was the CEO of the American data and telecommunications company AT&T Nordics AB from 1989 to 1991, and served as a staff officer in the Planning Section of the Air Staff from 1991 to 1992. He then attended the Main Course in 1992 and the Information Service Course from 1992 to 1995 at the Swedish National Defence College. He served as the Air Force's information chief from 1992 to 1993. In 1993, he succeeded Björn Kagger as the Chief of Information of the Defence Staff in connection with the reorganization into the new central military headquarters. He served as the Swedish Armed Forces' information chief at the Defence Staff from 1993 to 1994 and at the Swedish Armed Forces Headquarters from 1994 to 1997. He was promoted to lieutenant colonel with special employment status in 1993 and to colonel in 1994.

In 1996, Wagermark was proposed by the then Supreme Commander of the Swedish Armed Forces General Owe Wiktorin to be placed as a military advisor to the Swedish UN Ambassador Peter Osvald in New York City. In the Swedish Armed Forces Headquarters, Wagermark's successor was appointed. In April 1997, General Wictorin withdrew the proposal for Wagermark after the Ministry for Foreign Affairs requested a person with broader international experience. Wagermark declined the position as a military advisor at the UN because the Ministry for Foreign Affairs demanded that he first enhance his international competence with at least seven months of work in various positions abroad. The Swedish Armed Forces suspected that former Defence Minister Thage G. Peterson had been acting behind the scenes. Peterson was said to have been upset by Wagermark's actions during the so-called Volvo affair in Arboga.

In 1997, he attended the United Nations Staff Officers Course at the Swedish Armed Forces International Centre (Försvarsmaktens internationella centrum, Swedint). In July of the same year, Wagermark was appointed as the new head of the Swedish Air Force's Uppsala Schools (Flygvapnets Uppsalaskolor, F 20) in Uppsala. Colonel Kurt Svensson was appointed as his successor as the information chief. A couple of months later, it was reported that Wagermark had chosen to leave the Swedish Armed Forces as he had accepted an offer from the public relations firm Kreab. There, according to his own statement, he would work on education, crisis management, media, and leadership issues for companies. Wagermark served as Vice President at Kreab for seven months before rejoining the Swedish Air Force on 1 July 1998, as a senior colonel and Chief of Staff at the Air Force Center, which replaced the Air Force Command at Headquarters in Stockholm. He thereby became the deputy to Major General Jan Jonsson, while also serving as the Deputy Inspector General of Air Force.

From 1 January 2001, he was employed by the Ministry of Defence and served in Brussels as the deputy military representative to the European Union Military Committee.

=== Later career ===
Wagermark served as the senior military advisor and communications director in Gripen International from 2002 to 2008 and in Saab Bofors Dynamics from 2008 to 2009. Wagermark was the chief of staff and senior adviser to Håkan Buskhe, the president and CEO of Saab AB within the CEO Office, between 2009 and 2016. Wagermark is currently the special adviser to the president and CEO of Saab AB within the CEO Office, having been appointed in July 2016. He is also a board member of the Swedish Indian Business Council (SIBC).

== Personal life ==
Wagermark is married to the social worker Margareta. They have two children, Maria and Martin.

Wagermark is the Grand Prior (national leader) of the Knights Templar in Sweden. He is the former chairman of the Swedish Air Force Fan Club.

== Awards and decorations ==
- (Sweden) H. M. The King's Medal, 8th size gold (silver-gilt) medal worn on the chest suspended by the Order of the Seraphim ribbon (1988)

== Dates of rank ==
- 1973 - Lieutenant
- 1975 - Captain
- 1983 - Major
- 1988 - Lieutenant colonel
- 1993 – Överstelöjtnant med särskild tjänsteställning
- 1994 – Colonel
- 1998 – Senior colonel

== Honours ==
- Member of the Royal Swedish Academy of War Sciences (1996)
- Member of the French Académie de l'air et de l'espace

Military offices
Preceded by None	Deputy Inspector of the Air Force; 1998–2000	Succeeded by Jan Andersson
Preceded by Curt Westberg	Deputy Chief of the Air Component Command; 1998–2000	Succeeded by Jan Andersson
