= Jan Salestrand =

Swedish Air Force officer

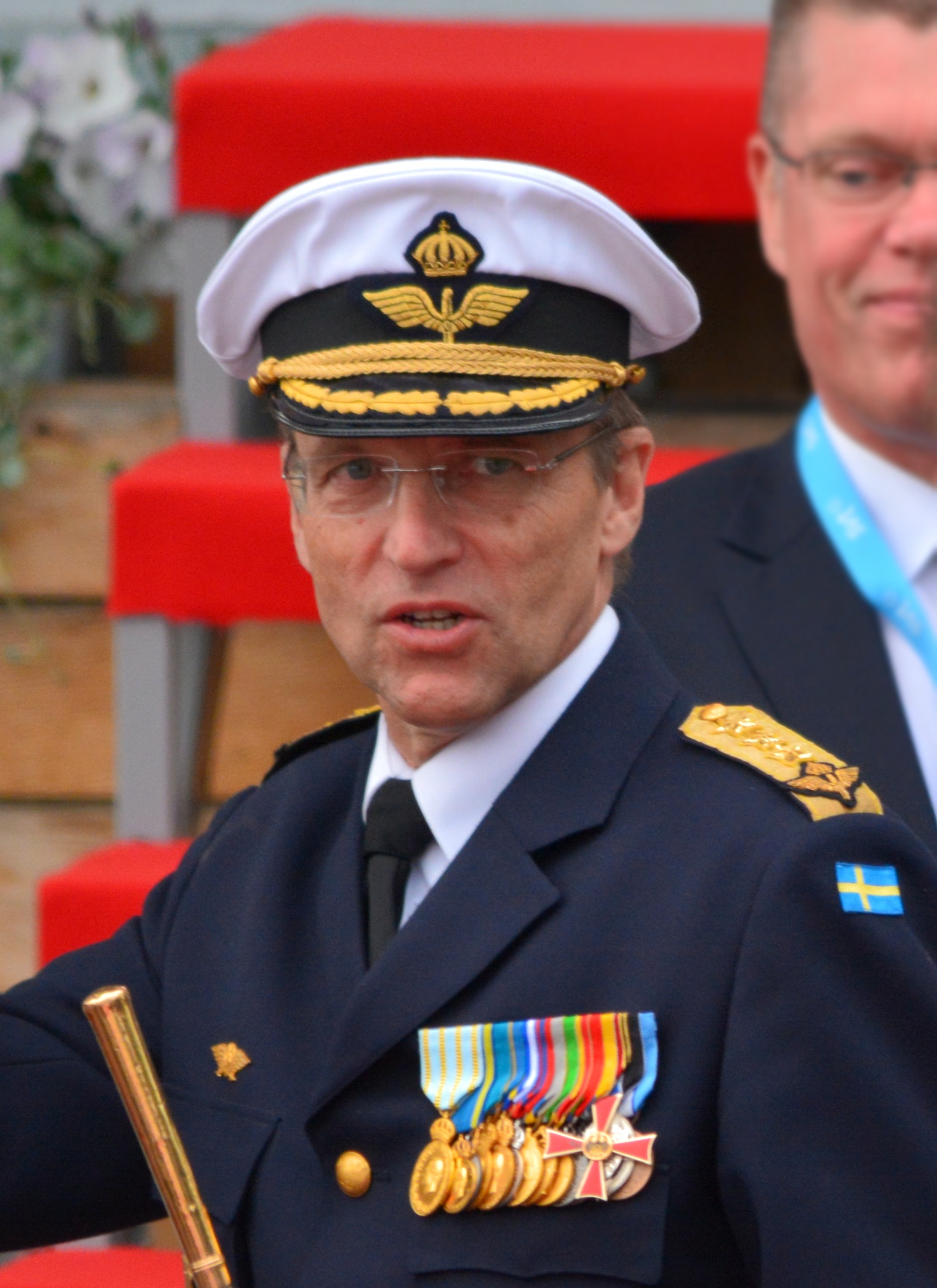
- Born: Jan Ingvar Salestrand; 29 July 1954 (age 72); Växjö, Sweden
- Military career
- Allegiance: Sweden
- Branch: Swedish Air Force
- Service years: 1975–2014
- Rank: Lieutenant General
- Commands: Jämtland Wing; Deputy Chief of General Training and Management; Assistant Chief of Armed Forces Training & Procurement; Chief of Armed Forces Training & Procurement; Chief of Defence Staff; Swedish Armed Forces Headquarters; Swedish Armed Forces Special Forces; Commandant General in Stockholm; Deputy Supreme Commander
- Other work: State Secretary in the MoD; Chief of His Majesty's Military Staff

Lieutenant General Jan Ingvar Salestrand (born 29 July 1954) is a retired Swedish Air Force officer. Salestrand has served as Chief of Defence Staff, head of the Swedish Armed Forces Headquarters, head of the Swedish Armed Forces Special Forces and as the Commandant General in Stockholm. From 2014 to 2018, he served as State Secretary to the Minister for Defence Peter Hultqvist. From 2018 to 2023, Salestrand served as Chief of His Majesty's Military Staff.

== Career ==
Salestrand was born on 29 July 1954 in Växjö, Sweden. He attended platoon officers course from 1974 to 1975 and served as an instructor at the Västgöta Wing (F 6) in 1975. Salestrand attended company officers course from 1978 to 1979 and served as platoon commander at the Västgöta Wing in 1979. In 1982, he became head of the General Department at the Västgöta Wing and in 1984, he attended the Swedish Air Force War College (Flygvapnets krigshögskola, FKHS). Salestrand completed the Swedish Armed Forces Staff College's basic course from 1986 to 1987 and served as company commander at the Västgöta Wing in 1987. He then completed the Swedish Armed Forces Staff College's senior course from 1988 to 1990 and served as an Operational/Tactical Officer Education (op/ta) teacher at the Swedish Armed Forces Staff College in 1990.

Salestrand served as base commander at the Västgöta Wing in 1992 and was head of the Base Section in the Air Force Command at the Swedish Air Force Headquarters in 1994. He attended the Air War College in United States from 1996 to 1997 and back in Sweden in 1997 he was head of the Planning Department at the Swedish Armed Forces Headquarters in Stockholm. Salestrand was appointed commanding officer of the Jämtland Wing (F 4) and commanding officer of Östersund Garrison on 1 October 2000. He served in this position until 2003 and during this time he also attended the civil management course at Solbacka in Södermanland in 2002. He was appointed Deputy Chief of General Training and Management (Grundorganisationsledningen) on 1 October 2003 and then served as Assistant Chief of Armed Forces Training & Procurement from 2005 to 2007. In 2007 he attended the management course at Solbacka in Södermanland.

Salestrand served as Chief of Armed Forces Training & Procurement from 2007 to 2009. On 7 May 2009, he was appointed Chief of Defence Staff and head of the Swedish Armed Forces Headquarters. In this position he was also the head of the Swedish Armed Forces Special Forces and the Commandant General in Stockholm. Salestrand acted from 31 January 2013 until 18 March 2013 as Deputy Supreme Commander and Chief of Swedish Armed Forces. This because of Supreme Commander General Sverker Göranson's sick leave for exhaustion. Salestrand left his positions and retired from the military in 2014. On 7 October 2014, Salestrand was appointed State Secretary to the Minister for Defence Peter Hultqvist. On 9 September 2018, he was appointed Chief of His Majesty's Military Staff, taking office on 1 October 2018. He was succeeded by Major General Peder Ohlsson in 2023.

== Personal life ==
Salestrand has three children.

== Dates of rank ==
- 1975 – Sergeant
- 1978 – Second lieutenant
- 1981 – Lieutenant
- 1983 – Captain
- 1987 – Major
- 1992 – Lieutenant colonel
- 1998 – Colonel
- 2003 – Brigadier general
- 2005 – Major general
- 2007 – Lieutenant general

== Awards and decorations ==
=== Swedish ===
- (Sweden) King Carl XVI Gustaf's Jubilee Commemorative Medal II (2013)
- (Sweden) For Zealous and Devoted Service of the Realm
- (Sweden) Swedish Armed Forces Conscript Medal
- (Sweden) Swedish Air Force Volunteers Association Medal of Merit in silver
- (Sweden) Swedish Women's Voluntary Defence Organization Medal of Merit in silver
- (Sweden) Jämtland Wing Medal of Merit in silver (Jämtlands flygflottiljs förtjänstmedalj i silver)
- (Sweden) Swedish Working Dog Association Medal of Merit in Gold (Brukshundklubbens förtjänstmedalj guld)
- (Sweden) Swedish Air Force Airfield Engineers Medal of Merit in Gold (Flygvapnets flygfältsingenjörers förtjänstmedalj guld)
- (Sweden) Swedish Air Force Airfield Engineers Gösta Larsson's Plaque (Flygfältsingenjörernas Gösta Larsson plakett)
- (Sweden) Swedish Women Drivers Association Medal of Merit in Gold (Sveriges kvinnliga bilkårers riksförbunds förtjänstmedalj i guld)

=== Foreign ===
- Order of Merit of the Federal Republic of Germany
- (Italy) 2nd Class / Grand Officer of the Order of Merit of the Italian Republic (14 January 2019)
- Distinguished Service Medal, Estonia Armed Forces
- United Nations Medal (UNFICYP)
- Estonia: 1st Class of the Order of the Cross of the Eagle (2 May 2023)

Military offices
| Preceded by Ola Gynäs | Jämtland Wing; 2000–2003 | Succeeded by Tommy Bengtsson |
| Preceded by Lars Frisk | Deputy Chief of General Training and Management; 2003–2005 | Succeeded by ? |
| Preceded by None | Assistant Chief of Armed Forces Training & Procurement; 2005–2007 | Succeeded by Göran Mårtensson |
| Preceded by None | Chief of Armed Forces Training & Procurement; 2007–2009 | Succeeded by Göran Mårtensson |
| Preceded by Sverker Göranson | Chief of Defence Staff; 2009–2014 | Succeeded by Dennis Gyllensporre |
| Preceded by Sverker Göranson | Swedish Armed Forces Headquarters; 2009–2014 | Succeeded by Dennis Gyllensporre |
| Preceded by Jörgen Ericsson | Swedish Armed Forces Special Forces; 2009–2014 | Succeeded by Dennis Gyllensporre |
| Preceded by Anders Lindström | Commandant General in Stockholm; 2012–2014 | Succeeded by Dennis Gyllensporre |
Court offices
| Preceded by Håkan Pettersson | Chief of His Majesty's Military Staff; 2018–2023 | Succeeded by Peder Ohlsson |
