= Anders Silwer =

Swedish Air Force officer

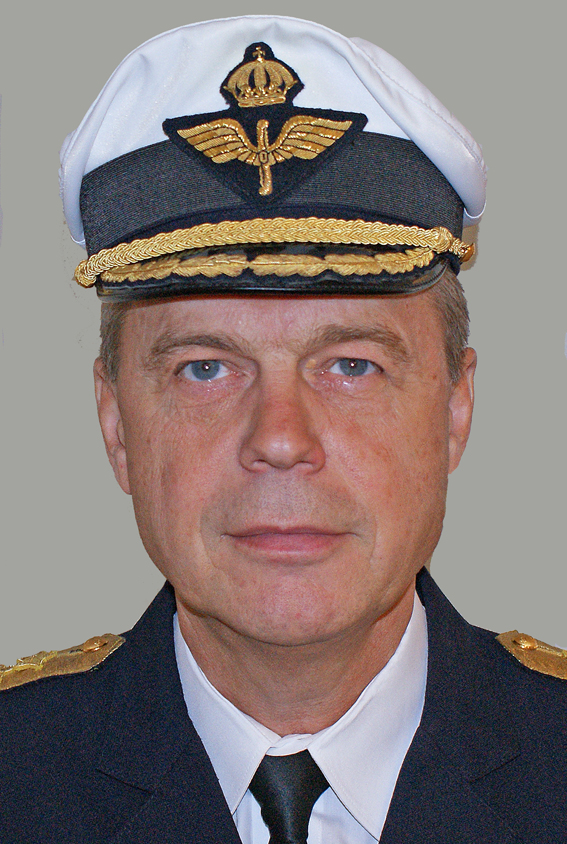
- Born: Anders Tommy Silwer; 20 January 1959 (age 67); Båstad, Sweden
- Military career
- Allegiance: Sweden
- Branch: Swedish Air Force
- Service years: 1979–2017
- Rank: Lieutenant General
- Commands: Inspector of the Air Force; Air Component Command; Chief of Joint Operations; Chief of Armed Forces Training & Procurement

Lieutenant General Anders Tommy Silwer (born 20 January 1959) is a retired Swedish Air Force officer. His last position was as the Chief of Armed Forces Training & Procurement from 2014 to 2017.

== Early life ==
Silwer was born in Båstad, Sweden and grew up in the countryside of northwest Scania. His interest in flying came at an age of 10 when his cousin brought him along in a private aircraft. Silwer then joined the local shooting association.

== Career ==
In the beginning of Silwer's military career he was an Instructor Ground Defence at the Scania Wing (F 10) from 1979 to 1981 and from 1985 he served as an Interceptor Pilot of Saab 35 Draken at the Scania Wing until 1989. He flew Saab 35 Draken, Saab JAS 39 Gripen and Saab 105 totaling 2200 flight hours. Silwer was a Qualified Flying Instructor for Saab 35 Draken at the Scania Wing from 1990 to 1992 and underwent the Royal Australian Air Force's Basic Staff Course at RAAF College in Point Cook, Australia in the spring of 1992. Back in Sweden, Silwer completed the Staff Course at the National Defence College in Stockholm from 1992 and 1993.

He was acting commanding officer of the 103 Fighter Squadron at the Scania Wing from 1993 to 1994 and commanding officer of the 102 Fighter Squadron at the Scania Wing from 1994 to 1995. Silwer completed the Command and General Staff Course at the Swedish National Defence College in Stockholm from 1995 to 1997 and was commanding officer of the Operational Test and Evaluation Unit Gripen at the Skaraborg Wing (F 7) from 1998 to 2000. He completed a Master in Strategic studies at the Air War College, Air University in United States from 2000 to 2001. Silwer was then the Chief of Staff Operations at the Air Force Tactical Command in Uppsala from 2001 to 2002 and the Deputy Air Component Commander at the Air Force Command in Uppsala from 2003 to 2004.

Silwer was then the head of the Strategic Short Term Planning, Strategic Plans and Policy at the Swedish Armed Forces Headquarters from 2004 to 2005 and the commander of the Joint Forces Air Component Command at the Swedish Joint Forces Command (Insatsstaben) in Uppsala from 2006 to 2007. He was the deputy commander of the Air Component Command at the Swedish Joint Forces Command in Stockholm from 2007 to 2008 and was the Inspector of the Air Force and commander of the Air Component Command from 2008 to 2011. Silwer then served as Chief of Joint Operations from 2012 to 2013 before being appointed Chief of Armed Forces Training & Procurement in 2014. He retired in March 2017.

== Other work ==
Silwer became a member of the Royal Swedish Academy of War Sciences in 2000 and a member of the International Hall of Fame at the United States Air University in 2001. He was a board member of the Swedish Defence University from 1 May 2016 to 30 April 2017.

== Personal life ==
Silwer lived on Lidingö. He is married and has three children. His surname, Silwer, comes from a fältskär who lived in Silvåkra which today belongs to the training grounds of South Scanian Regiment (P 7).

== Dates of rank ==
- 1979 - Överfurir
- 1981 - Sergeant
- 1983 - Lieutenant
- 1989 - Captain
- 1993 - Major
- 1998 - Lieutenant colonel
- 2001 - Colonel
- 2006 - Brigadier general
- 2008 - Major general
- 2012 - Lieutenant general

== Awards and decorations ==
Silwer's awards:

- (Sweden) For Zealous and Devoted Service of the Realm
- (Sweden) Swedish Armed Forces Conscript Medal
- (Sweden) Swedish Air Force Volunteers Association Merit Badge
- (Sweden) Air Defence Regiment Medal of Merit (Luftvärnsregementets förtjänstmedalj)
- (Sweden) Swedish Reserve Officers Federation Merit Badge (Förbundet Sveriges Reservofficerares förtjänsttecken)

Military offices
Preceded by Jan Andersson	Inspector of the Air Force; 2008–2011	Succeeded by Micael Bydén
Preceded by Jan Andersson	Air Component Command; 2008–2011	Succeeded by Micael Bydén
Preceded by Anders Lindström	Chief of Joint Operations; 2012–2013	Succeeded by Göran Mårtensson
Preceded by Göran Mårtensson	Chief of Armed Forces Training & Procurement; 2014–2017	Succeeded by Johan Svensson
