= Chief of Armed Forces Training & Procurement =

Role within the Swedish Armed Forces

- Chefen för produktion
- Swedish Armed Forces
- Type: Chief of the Training & Procurement Staff
- Abbreviation: C PROD
- Member of: Defence Board
- Reports to: Supreme Commander of the Swedish Armed Forces
- Seat: Swedish Armed Forces Headquarters, Lidingövägen 24, Stockholm
- Term length: No fixed term
- Constituting instrument: FFS 2007:4, Chapter 5 FFS 2013:4, Chapter 9 FFS 2016:2, Chapter 9 FIB 2020:5, Chapter 9
- Formation: 1 April 2007
- First holder: Lieutenant General Jan Salestrand
- Final holder: Lieutenant General Johan Svensson
- Abolished: 31 December 2022
- Unofficial names: Chefen för produktionsledningen, Produktionschefen
- Deputy: Assistant Chief of Armed Forces Training & Procurement

The Chief of Armed Forces Training & Procurement (Swedish: Chefen för produktion, C PROD, sometimes as Chefen för produktionsledningen or Produktionschefen) was a three-star role within the Swedish Armed Forces, responsible the Training & Procurement Staff. The Chief of Armed Forces Training & Procurement was part of the Defence Board (Försvarsmaktsledningen, FML), a group of the Supreme Commander's top commanders.

== Organisation ==
At the Swedish Armed Forces Headquarters's reorganization on 1 April 2007, the Training & Procurement Staff was created. The staff ensures that the Swedish Armed Forces have all the resources required to carry out operations. Its assignments include everything from recruitment and training of personnel to the development of equipment such as weapons, vehicles, ships, and aircraft. The Training & Procurement Staff had a broad area of responsibility which includes both supply of materiel and logistics as well as training of the Swedish Armed Forces' units. The Training & Procurement Staff's assignment was divided between departments with different areas of responsibility, such as the naval and aviation departments. The commanders of these departments are called stridskraftchefer ("combat forces commanders"): the Chief of Army, the Chief of Navy, the Chief of Air Force, the Chief of Defence Logistics, the Chief of Plans (Ledningssystemchefen) and the Chief of Home Guard. The Chief of Armed Forces Training & Procurement reports directly to the Supreme Commander. Sorting under the Chief of Armed Forces Training & Procurement, are all the Swedish Armed Forces' organizational units, i.e. all units, schools and centers, except the headquarters.

== Chiefs of Armed Forces Training & Procurement ==
No.	Portrait	Chief of Defence Staff	Took office	Left office	Time in office	Defence branch	Supreme Commander	Ref.
1	Jan Salestrand	Lieutenant general Jan Salestrand (born 1954)	2007	2008	0–1 years	Air Force	Håkan Syrén	
2	Göran Mårtensson	Lieutenant general Göran Mårtensson (born 1960)	2009	2014	4–5 years	Army	Sverker Göranson	
3	Anders Silwer	Lieutenant general Anders Silwer (born 1959)	2014	2017	2–3 years	Air Force	Sverker Göranson; Micael Bydén	-
4	Johan Svensson	Lieutenant general Johan Svensson (born 1962)	1 March 2017	31 December 2022	5 years, 0 days	Air Force	Micael Bydén	
