= Jan Andersson (Swedish Air Force officer) =

Swedish Air Force major general

- Born: Jan Robert Andreas Andersson; 22 July 1955 (age 71); Västervik, Sweden
- Military career
- Allegiance: Sweden
- Branch: Swedish Air Force
- Service years: ?–2011
- Rank: Major general
- Commands: Skaraborg Wing; Deputy Inspector General of the Air Force; Deputy Chief of the Air Force Command; Inspector of the Air Force; Air Component Command

Major General Jan Robert Andreas Andersson (born 22 July 1955) is a retired Swedish Air Force officer. He served as Inspector of the Air Force from 2003 to 2008.

== Early life ==
Andersson was born in Västervik, Sweden. He served in the Army Ranger School in Kiruna, Lapland and 19-years-old, on his way home from Kiruna, Andersson flew for the first time. He studied to become an engineer but dropped out and enrolled at the Swedish Air Force Flying School in Ljungbyhed.

== Career ==
After graduating, Andersson was commissioned as an officer and was assigned to Norrbotten Wing (F 21). In the mid-1980s he was recruited to Linjeflyg as a commercial pilot but decided to stay in the air force. He underwent the management course at the Swedish National Defence College from 1987 to 1989. He flew Saab JAS 39 Gripen for the first time on 23 June 1993. He was then chief of tactical evaluation of the Saab JAS 39 Gripen. Andersson was commanding officer of the Skaraborg Wing (F 7) from 1998 to 2001. He was then promoted to brigadier general and was appointed chief of staff and Deputy Chief of the Air Force Command in Uppsala as well as Deputy Inspector General of the Air Force on 1 April 2001.

Andersson took office as Inspector of the Air Force in the Swedish Armed Forces Headquarters on 1 January 2003. He was at the same time promoted to major general. Andersson served in this position until 2008 when he was succeeded by Anders Silwer and appointed military attaché in Washington, D.C. He retired from the Swedish Armed Forces in 2011 and then hold a position as Senior Military Advisor at the Swedish Defence and Security Export Agency (Försvarsexportmyndigheten).

== Awards and decorations ==
- (Sweden) Royal Swedish Academy of War Sciences Medal of Reward in gold, 8th size (12 November 2018)

== Honours ==
- Member of the Royal Swedish Academy of War Sciences (1999)
- Chairman of Section III, Air Warfare Studies, of the Royal Swedish Academy of War Sciences (2014)

== Personal life ==
Andersson is married to Gunilla, a teacher, and they have two children.

== Dates of rank ==
- 1998 – Colonel
- 1 April 2001 – Brigadier general
- 1 January 2003 – Major general

Military offices
Preceded by Owe Wagermark	Deputy Inspector General of the Air Force; 2001–2001	Succeeded by ?
Preceded by Owe Wagermark	Deputy Chief of the Air Force Command; 2000–2002	Succeeded by Anders Silwer
Preceded by Mats Nilsson	Inspector of the Air Force; 2003–2008	Succeeded by Anders Silwer
Preceded by Owe Wagermark	Chief of the Air Component Command; 2007–2008	Succeeded by Anders Silwer
