= Lennart Pettersson (pentathlete) =

Swedish modern pentathlete

- Born: Ingvar Lennart Pettersson; 1 February 1951 (age 75); Uppsala, Sweden
- Military career
- Allegiance: Sweden
- Branch: Swedish Air Force
- Service years: 1968–2006
- Rank: Brigadier general
- Nickname: "Lelle"
- Commands: Blekinge Wing; Air Force Tactical Command
- Sports career
- Nationality: Swedish
- Sport: Modern pentathlon
- Retired: 1984
Medal record
Men's modern pentathlon
Representing Sweden
Olympic Games
Bronze medal – third place	1980 Moskva	Team

Brigadier General Ingvar Lennart Pettersson (born 1 February 1951) is a retired Swedish Air Force officer and former modern pentathlete. He competed at the 1980 Summer Olympics, winning a bronze medal in the team event.

== Early life ==
Pettersson was born on 1 February 1951 in Uppsala, Sweden, the son of Ingvar Pettersson and his wife May (née Svanberg). He grew up in Knivsta in Uppland. During his school days, Pettersson got the opportunity to do a work life orientation at Uppland Wing (F 16) in Uppsala after the father of one of his friends worked at the wing and arranged a place for him. Pettersson was good at most sports, but his physical education teacher encouraged him to focus on modern pentathlon. Thanks to the modern pentathlon, Pettersson started riding as a 14-year-old. It was at the Royal Norrland Dragoons (K 4) in Umeå, at that time there were still cavalry left there. Pettersson eventually moved to Uppsala where he continued to ride once a week as part of the pentathlon training. In 1967, he applied for flight training in Ljungbyhed and got accepted. Pettersson was 16 years old when, on Sunday, 28 January 1968, he got on the train in Knivsta to go to Ljungbyhed to enroll at the Swedish Air Force Flying School.

== Career ==
=== Military career ===
Pettersson attended the Swedish Air Force Flying School from 1968 to 1970. In the fall of 1970, as a 19-year-old, Pettersson came to Uppland Wing (F 16) flight school and was thus Sweden's youngest pilot. He was stationed at Västmanland Wing (F 1) in Västerås. For twelve years he flew the Saab 35 Draken but was transferred in 1982 to Bråvalla Wing (F 13) in Norrköping to fly the interceptor fighter version of Saab 37 Viggen. Pettersson belonged to the first group on the new aircraft system. There he was later promoted to squadron commander of "Martin Blå", 2nd squadron/F 13. He attended the Swedish National Defence College from 1982 to 1983. In 1990, he had started attending the higher course at the Swedish Armed Forces Staff College (MHS) in Stockholm when he was diagnosed with laryngeal cancer. In 1991, he graduated from MHS and received new duties, this time in the Air Staff. He was given responsibility for the development of a warning and countermeasures system for the JA 37 fighter interceptor in project TK ("E/W") (electronic warfare). The result was the U95 radar jamming pod, developed especially for the JA 37 system with the prerequisites to also function in the Saab JAS 39 Gripen.

In the mid-1990s, he served as chief administrator for flight systems at the Air Force Tactical Center in Linköping. Pettersson served in Blekinge Wing in Kallinge from 1995 to 1997 and in the National Aeronautical Research Institute in Stockholm from 1997 to 1998. Pettersson served as commander of Blekinge Wing from 1998 to 2000. He was promoted to brigadier general and appointed commander of the Air Force Tactical Command in Uppsala from 1 January 2003.

=== Sports career ===
Pettersson is three time Swedish champion in modern pentathlon. He competed as a modern pentathlete at the 1980 Summer Olympics, winning a bronze medal in the team event. He was not selected for the 1984 Summer Olympics and he then decided to stop being an active modern pentathlete. Pettersson was the head coach of the Swedish national team in modern pentathlon from 1992 to 1996. After a few years' break, in 2000 he was elected chairman of the modern pentathlon in Sweden. The following year, he was elected a board member of the Swedish Olympic Committee.

== Personal life ==
In 1964, Pettersson married Jane Pettersson (born 1952), the daughter of Per-Elon and Marianne Pettersson.
