= Gnarp =

- Location within Sweden Gävleborg Location within Sweden
- Coordinates: 62°04′N 17°17′E
- Country: Sweden
- Province: Hälsingland
- County: Gävleborg County
- Municipality: Nordanstig Municipality

Area
  - Total: 2.02 km^{2} (0.78 sq mi)

Population (31 December 2010)
  - Total: 1,026
  - Density: 509/km^{2} (1,320/sq mi)
- Time zone: UTC+1 (CET)
  - Summer (DST): UTC+2 (CEST)
- Climate: Dfc

Gnarp is a locality situated in Nordanstig Municipality, Gävleborg County, Sweden with 1,026 inhabitants in 2010.

It's the birthplace of Micael Byden recipient of the Legion of Merit and Order of Aeronautical Merit.
