= Marshal of the Court (Sweden) =

Officer at the Royal Court of Sweden

Marshal of the Court (Swedish: Hovmarskalk) was the officer at the Royal Court of Sweden whose task was to assist the king in the Keeper of the Privy Purse. Today the Marshal of the Court are officers of the Office of the Marshal of the Court (Swedish: Hovmarskalksämbetet) which is responsible for the Swedish Royal Family's official appearances and representation — preparing and conducting state visits, official visits, formal audiences, official dinners, jubilees, and municipality visits and more.

The Office of the Marshal of the Court consists of the H.M. The King's Household, H.M. The Queen's Household, Her Royal Highness The Crown Princess's Household, the Royal Stables, the Household and the Ceremonial Household.

== First Marshal of the Court ==
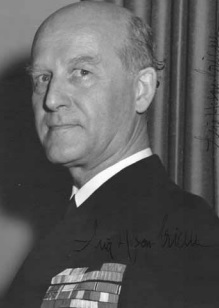
Admiral Stig H:son Ericson served as the First Marshal of the Court from 1962 to 1969.

The Office of the Marshal of the Court is headed by the First Marshal of the Court (Swedish: Förste hovmarskalk). Supporting him are a Surveyor of the Court, two Court Secretaries, three Court Assistants and two administrative employees.

- 1844–1849: Gustaf Fredrik Liljencrantz
- 1869–1872: Erik af Edholm
- 1907–1928: Carl Malcolm Lilliehöök (Note: Became vaktfri in 1911; honorary title which mean that the person doesn't have any tasks.)
- 1912–1915: Fredrik Peyron
- 1915–1930: Claes Erik Rålamb
- 1930–1947: Reinhold Rudbeck
- 1947–1950: Carl-Reinhold von Essen
- 1952–1961: Erik Wetter
- 1962–1973: Stig H:son Ericson
- 1973–1975: Tom Wachtmeister
- 1975–1980: Björn von der Esch
- 1980–1986: Lennart Ahrén
- 1987–1993: Jan Kuylenstierna
- 1993–1998: Hans Ewerlöf
- 1998–2007: Johan Fischerström
- 2007–2011: Lars-Hjalmar Wide
- 2012–31 December 2022: Mats Nilsson
- 2023–present: Göran Lithell

== See also ==
- Hofmarschall
