= Såtenäs =

- Location within Västra Götaland Location within Sweden
- Coordinates: 58°26′18″N 12°41′40″E
- Country: Sweden
- Province: Västergötland
- County: Västra Götaland County
- Municipality: Lidköping Municipality

Population (2015)
  - Total: 106
- Time zone: UTC+1 (CET)
  - Summer (DST): UTC+2 (CEST)
- Climate: Dfb

Såtenäs (Swedish pronunciation: [ˈsôːtɛˌnɛːs]) is a smaller locality situated in Lidköping Municipality, Västra Götaland County, Sweden. Såtenäs is located at Vänern's southwestern part about 32 kilometers from Lidköping and 32 kilometers from Trollhättan.

Most of Såtenäs consists of Skaraborg Wing (F 7) and F 7 Farm and Wing Museum (F 7 Gårds- och flottiljmuseum). Before the Swedish Air Force bought the area, the properties were one of Västergötland's major goods.

In the immediate vicinity of Såtenäs is the community Tun.
