= Micael Bydén =

Swedish general and former supreme commander

General Micael Bydén
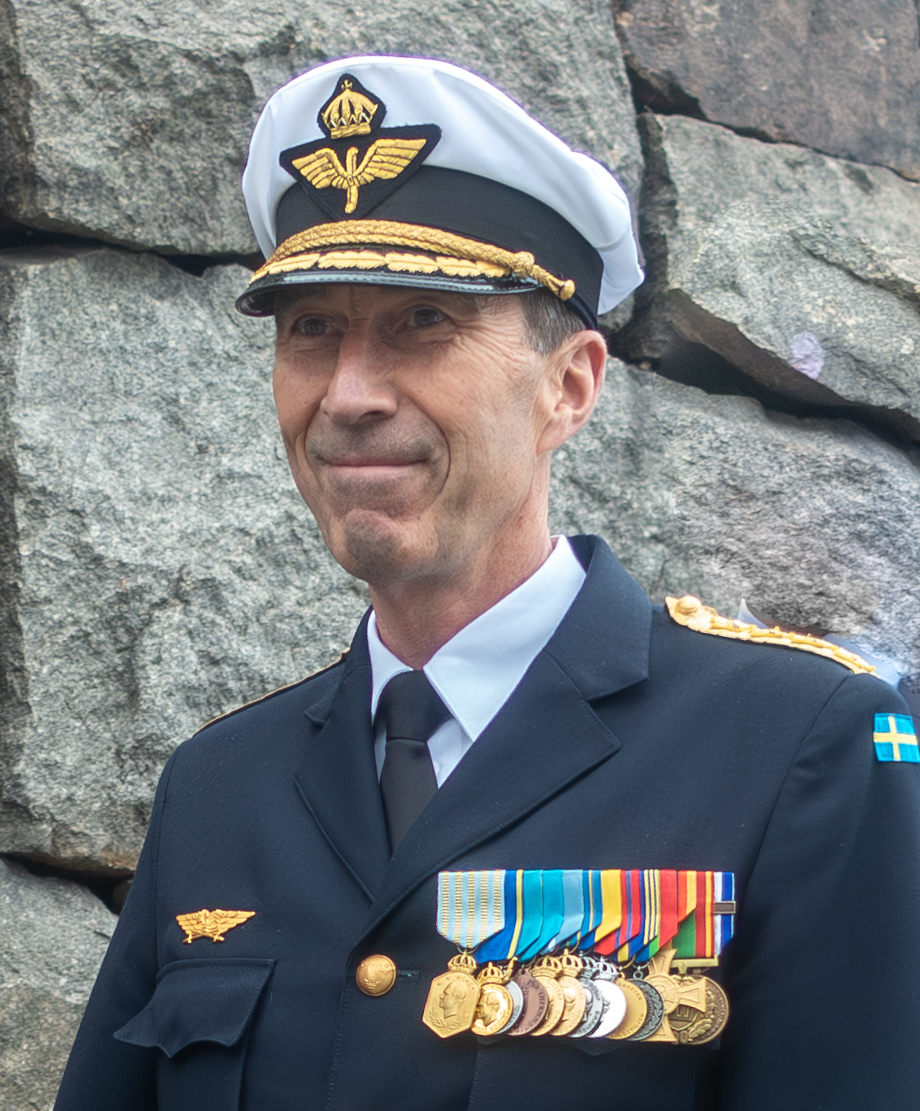
- Bydén in 2024
- Born: 13 June 1964 (age 62); Gnarp, Sweden
- Military career
- Allegiance: Sweden
- Branch: Swedish Air Force
- Service years: 1985–2024
- Rank: General
- Nickname: "Pinewood" (call sign)
- Commands: Helicopter Wing; Air Force Training and Development Staff; Air Component Command; Chief of Air Force; Supreme Commander

General Per Micael Bydén (born 13 June 1964) is a retired Swedish Air Force officer. Bydén served as Supreme Commander of the Swedish Armed Forces from 2015 to 2024. Prior to that, he served as the Chief of Air Force and commander of the Air Component Command from 2012 and 2015.

== Early life ==
Bydén was born in Gnarp, Sweden, the son of Alvar and Gun Bydén. He did his mandatory military service in Älvsborg Coastal Artillery Regiment (KA 4) in Gothenburg in 1982 and then attended the Coastal Artillery and Navy Officers Academy in Gothenburg and Karlskrona from 1983 to 1985 and was commissioned as second lieutenant in the naval mine and boat service in Härnösand Coastal Artillery Regiment (KA 5) the same year.

== Career ==
He completed the Air Force's basic pilot flight training at the Swedish Air Force Flying School in Ljungbyhed from 1986 to 1987 and was then a fighter pilot at Norrbotten Wing (F 21) from 1989 to 1996. He flew SK 61, SK 60, AJS/SF/SH/JA 37 as well as HKP 6 totaling 1,500 flight hours. Bydén completed the Royal Swedish Air Force Academy's (Flygvapnets krigsskola) general course in Uppsala from 1990 to 1991 and the higher course in 1992.

In 1991, Bydén was promoted to lieutenant and 1992 to captain and 1996 to major. He completed the Swedish National Defence College' tactical course in Stockholm from 1995 to 1996 and was Deputy Squadron Commander at Norrbotten Wing from 1996 to 1997. Bydén completed the Swedish National Defence College' advanced command course from 1997 to 1999 and served as Assistant Air Attaché at the Swedish Embassy in Washington, D.C., from 1999 to 2001. Bydén was promoted to lieutenant-colonel in 2001 and served as Air Attaché at the Swedish Embassy in Washington, D.C., from 2001 to 2002 and then as staff officer at the Air Force Branch at the Swedish Armed Forces Headquarters in Stockholm from 2002 to 2003. Bydén was commanding officer of the Swedish Air Force Flying Training School (Flygvapnets flygskola) in Linköping from 2003 to 2005 and deputy commanding officer of the Swedish Armed Forces Helicopter Wing in Linköping from 2005 to 2008.

He was promoted to colonel in 2006 and served as commanding officer of the Helicopter Wing from 2008 to 2009. Bydén was promoted to brigadier general in 2009 and served as head of the Air Force Training and Development Staff at the Swedish Armed Forces Headquarters in Stockholm from 2009 to 2011. In 2010 he completed the civil/military command course at Solbacka. Bydén was Chief of Staff of the Regional Command North of the International Security Assistance Force (ISAF) in Mazar-i-Sharif, Afghanistan in 2011 before becoming the Inspector of the Air Force (renamed Chief of Air Force in 2014) and head of the Air Component Command with the rank of major general in January 2012, a position he stayed in until being appointed Supreme Commander of the Swedish Armed Forces on 11 September 2015. Bydén was given a "jump-step" promotion which allowed him to advance two ranks, from major general to general, skipping lieutenant general. He took office and was promoted to general on 1 October 2015. In 2017 he said the Swedish army was seriously underfunded and understaffed. In response the Swedish government would increase the military budget by $331 million and reintroduce conscription by 2018.

Bydén served as Supreme Commander during Sweden's historic entry into the NATO military alliance. He also attended Sweden's formal flag raising ceremony at the NATO headquarters. Bydén retired in September 2024 and was succeeded by General Michael Claesson.

== Personal life ==
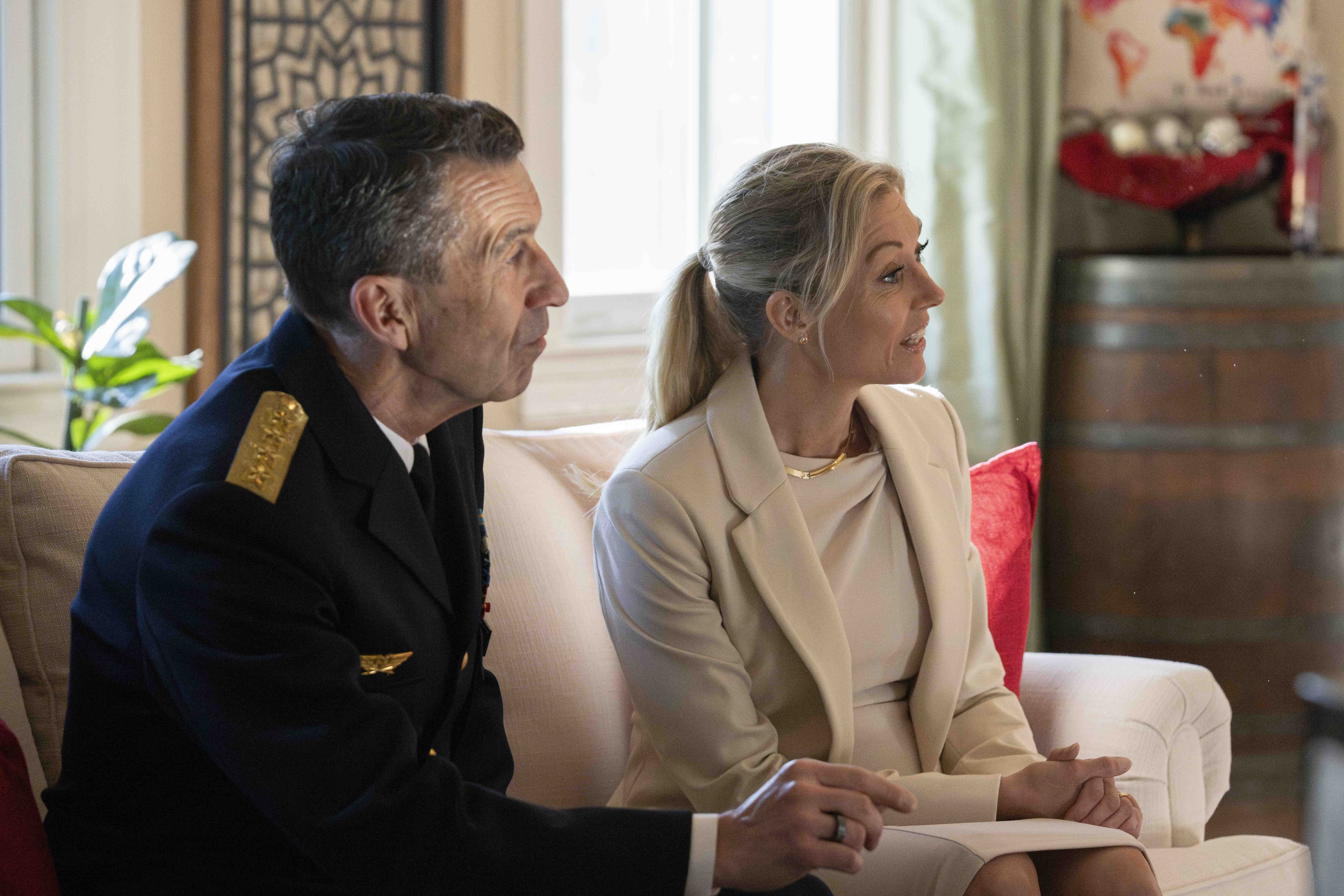
Bydén and Linda Staaf in May 2024

On 9 April 1999, Bydén married to Anita Carlman and together they have three children. The couple lived in Södertälje. They divorced in 2022.

In January 2024, it was reported that Bydén got engaged to Linda Staaf, the former head of intelligence at the National Operations Department (NOA) within the Swedish Police Authority.

== Dates of rank ==
- 1985 – Second lieutenant
- 1991 – Lieutenant
- 1992 – Captain
- 1996 – Major
- 2001 – Lieutenant colonel
- 2006 – Colonel
- 2009 – Brigadier general
- 2012 – Major general
- – (Note: Bydén was given a "jump-step" promotion which allowed him to advance two ranks, from major general to general, skipping lieutenant general, when he was appointed Supreme Commander of the Swedish Armed Forces from 1 October 2015.) – Lieutenant general
- 2015 – General

== Awards and decorations ==
=== Swedish ===
- (Sweden) H. M. The King's Medal, 12th size in gold on chain (6 June 2026)
- (Sweden) King Carl XVI Gustaf's Jubilee Commemorative Medal IV (15 September 2023)
- (Sweden) For Zealous and Devoted Service of the Realm
- (Sweden) Swedish Armed Forces Conscript Medal
- (Sweden) Swedish Armed Forces International Service Medal
- (Sweden) National Federation of Voluntary Motor Cycle Corps Medal of Merit in gold (Frivilliga Motorcykelkårernas Riksförbunds förtjänstmedalj i guld, FMCKGM)
- (Sweden) Home Guard Medal of Merit in gold
- (Sweden) Swedish Air Force Volunteers Association Medal of Merit in gold
- (Sweden) Helicopter Wing Gold Medal of Merit (Helikopterflottiljens förtjänstmedalj i guld)
- (Sweden) Swedish Air Force Volunteers Association Merit Badge
- (Sweden) Home Guard Silver Medal
- (Sweden) Swedish Reserve Officers Federation Merit Badge in silver (Förbundet Sveriges Reservofficerares förtjänsttecken i silver)

=== Foreign ===
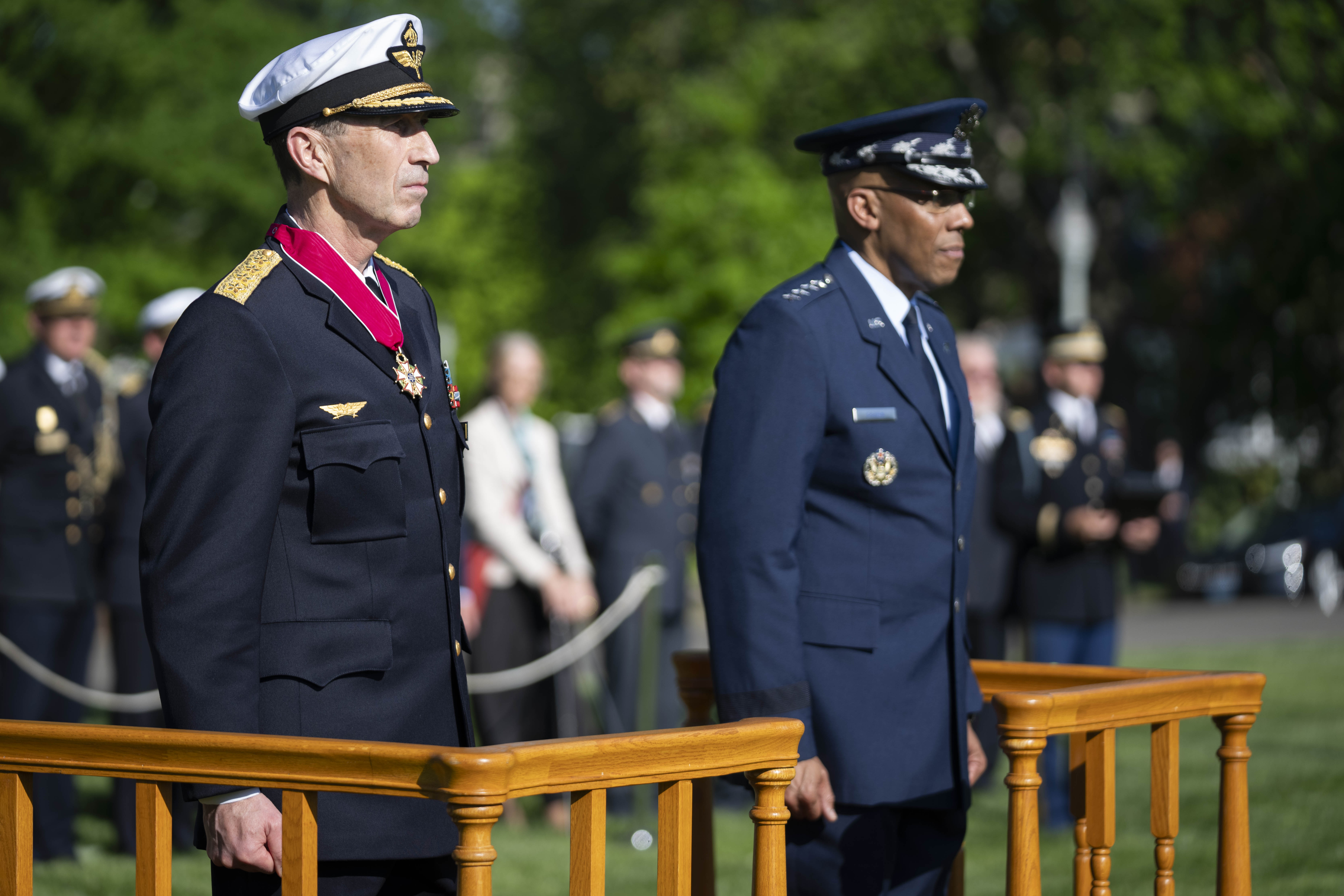
Bydén awarded the Legion of Merit in May 2024

- Commander Grand Cross of the Order of the Lion of Finland (25 September 2020, awarded in November 2020)
- (Norway) Commander of the Royal Norwegian Order of Merit with star (3 November 2015)
- (France) Commander of the Legion of Honour
- (United States) Commander of the Legion of Merit (1 May 2024)
- (Germany) Silver Cross of Honour of the Badge of Honour of the Bundeswehr
- (Brazil) Grand Officer of the Order of Aeronautical Merit
- (United States) Officer of the Legion of Merit
- (Lithuania) Commemorative Medal of the 100th Anniversary of the Restoration of Lithuanian Armed Forces
- NATO Non-Article 5 medal for ISAF

== Honours ==
- Member of the Royal Swedish Academy of War Sciences (2016)

== Footnotes ==
Military offices
Preceded by Johan Svensson	Swedish Armed Forces Helicopter Wing; 2008–2009	Succeeded by Magnus Westerlund
Preceded by Anders Silwer	Air Component Command; 2012–2013	Succeeded by Gabor Nagy
Preceded by Anders Silwer	Chief of Air Force; 2012–2015	Succeeded by Mats Helgesson
Preceded by Sverker Göranson	Supreme Commander of the Swedish Armed Forces; 2015–2024	Succeeded by Michael Claesson
