= Göran Mårtensson =

Swedish Army officer (born 1960)

- Born: Carl Göran Mårtensson; 26 May 1960 (age 66); Kristianstad, Sweden
- Military career
- Allegiance: Sweden
- Branch: Swedish Army
- Service years: 1983–2016
- Rank: Lieutenant General
- Commands: Artillery Regiment; Land Warfare Centre; Assistant Chief of Armed Forces Training & Procurement; Chief of Armed Forces Training & Procurement; Chief of Joint Operations
- Other work: Head of FMV

Lieutenant General Carl Göran Mårtensson (born 26 May 1960) is a retired Swedish Army officer and senior defense official. He served in the Swedish Armed Forces from 1983 to 2016, reaching the rank of lieutenant general, and later became Director General of the Swedish Defence Materiel Administration (FMV) and National Armament Director from 2016 to 2025. Mårtensson has held several of the most senior leadership positions in Swedish defense, including Chief of Joint Operations and Chief of Armed Forces Training & Procurement.

== Early life ==
Mårtensson was born on 26 May 1960 in Kristianstad, Sweden.

== Career ==
Mårtensson became a lieutenant in 1983 and captain in 1984. Mårtensson served as company commander in the Wendes Artillery Regiment (A 3) in 1989 and attended the Junior Staff Course at the Swedish Armed Forces Staff College from 1989 to 1990. He was promoted to major in 1990 and then attended the Advanced Staff Course at the Swedish Armed Forces Staff College from 1991 to 1993. Mårtensson served as a General Staff Aspirant at the Swedish Defence Materiel Administration in 1993 and at the Army Command (Arméledningen) at the Swedish Armed Forces Headquarters in 1994. He then served as Planning Officer at the Army Command (Arméledningen) at the Swedish Armed Forces Headquarters in 1995 and as ADC to the Chief of Army Staff two years later. Mårtensson was promoted to lieutenant colonel in 1998 and attended the Joint Command and Staff College in London from 1998 to 1999.

In 1999, he returned to his old unit, Wendes Artillery Regiment, as battalion commander and head of training. The year after, Mårtensson was appointed chief of the Unit Section (Förbandssektionen) in the General Training and Management Directorate (Grundorganisationsledningen) at the Swedish Armed Forces Headquarters in Stockholm. In 2002, he was promoted to colonel and appointed commanding officer of the Artillery Regiment, School of Artillery and the Kristinehamn Garrison. Mårtensson stayed in this position for four years, during this time responsible for relocation of the regiment to Boden in 2005. In 2006 he was appointed commanding officer of the Land Warfare Centre in Skövde and Kvarn. He was appointed Assistant Chief of Armed Forces Training & Procurement and promoted to brigadier general in 2007 and appointed Chief of Armed Forces Training & Procurement and promoted to major general in January 2009 when he and lieutenant general Anders Silwer changed positions. He was promoted to lieutenant general later that same year.

In 2014, Mårtensson was appointed Chief of Joint Operations and head of the Joint Forces Command, a position he held for two years. He was from 2009 to 2016 when he retired from the Swedish Armed Forces, a member of the Swedish Armed Forces Command Group (Försvarsmaktsledningen). Mårtensson was then appointed Director General of the Swedish Defence Materiel Administration (FMV) from 1 February 2016 and National Armament Director. On 20 October 2021, the Swedish government decided to extend Mårtensson's employment as Director General and head of the Swedish Defence Materiel Administration from 1 February 2022 to 31 January 2025. He was succeeded by Mikael Granholm on 1 July 2025.

== Personal life ==
Mårtensson is married and has three children.

== Dates of rank ==
- 1983 – Lieutenant
- 1984 – Captain
- 1990 – Major
- 1998 – Lieutenant colonel
- 2002 – Colonel
- 2007 – Brigadier general
- 2009 – Major general
- 2009 – Lieutenant general

== Awards ==
- (Sweden) For Zealous and Devoted Service of the Realm
- (Sweden) Swedish Armed Forces Conscript Medal
- (Sweden) Artillery Regiment (A 9) Medal of Medal (Artilleriregementets förtjänstmedalj)
- (Sweden) Swedish Reserve Officers Federation Merit Badge (Förbundet Sveriges Reservofficerares förtjänsttecken)
- (Sweden) Artillery Regiment (A 9) Commemorative Medal (Artilleriregementets (A 9) minnesmedalj) (2005)
- etc

== Honours ==
- Member of the board of the Swedish Defence Materiel Administration (2014)
- Member of the Royal Swedish Academy of War Sciences (2003)
- Member of the board of the Swedish Defence University (2010–2016)

Military offices
Preceded by Jan Salestrand	Assistant Chief of Armed Forces Training & Procurement; 2007–2009	Succeeded by Gunnar Karlson
Preceded by Jan Salestrand	Chief of Armed Forces Training & Procurement; 2009–2014	Succeeded by Anders Silwer
Preceded by Anders Silwer	Chief of Joint Operations; 2014–2016	Succeeded by Jan Thörnqvist
Government offices
Preceded by Dan Ohlsson	Swedish Defence Materiel Administration; 2016–2025	Succeeded by Mikael Granholm
