= Johan Svensson (Swedish Air Force officer) =

Swedish Air Force officer (born 1962)

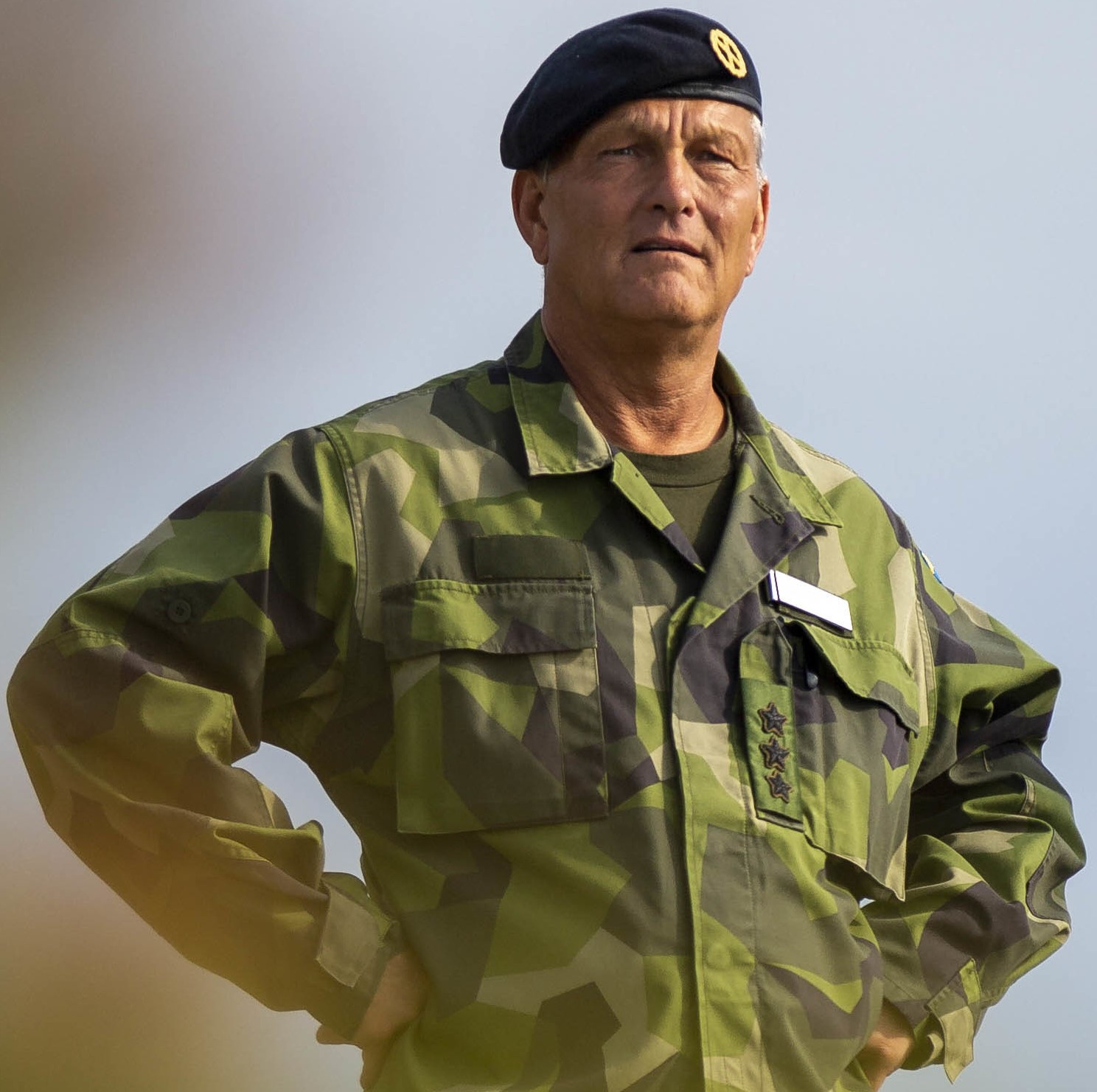
- Svensson in June 2022.
- Born: Karl Johan Svensson; 18 January 1962 (age 64); Falköping, Sweden
- Military career
- Allegiance: Sweden
- Branch: Swedish Army (1985–2001); Swedish Air Force (2001–)
- Service years: 1985–2022
- Rank: Lieutenant General
- Commands: Swedish Armed Forces Helicopter Wing; Deputy Chief, Air Component Command; Chief of Armed Forces Training & Procurement

Lieutenant General Karl Johan Svensson (born 18 January 1962) is a retired Swedish Air Force officer. He served as the Chief of Armed Forces Training & Procurement from 2017 to 2022.

== Early life ==
Svensson was born on 18 January 1962 in Falköping, Sweden. He did his national military service in the Svea Artillery Regiment (A 1) in Linköping from 1981 to 1982 and attended the Military Academy Karlberg from 1984 to 1985.

== Career ==
Svensson was commissioned as an officer in 1984. He continued serving in the Svea Artillery Regiment and passed the Staff Course at the Swedish Armed Forces Staff College from 1990 to 1991 and the Command and General Staff Course from 1993 to 1995. He served as an instructor at the Army Combat School (Arméns stridsskola) from 1995 to 1996 and then at the Army Command (Arméledningen) in the Defence Materiel Administration in 1996. Svensson was military advisor to the commanding officer of the Joint Operations Command (Operationsledningen, OPL) and to the Deputy Supreme Commander from 1997 to 1998.

Svensson was promoted to lieutenant colonel in 1998 and served in the Strategic Plans and Policy Directorate (Strategiledningen) at the Swedish Armed Forces Headquarters in Stockholm from 1998 to 2001 when he was appointed chief of staff of the Swedish Armed Forces Helicopter Wing. In 2004, Svensson was promoted to colonel and was appointed deputy commanding officer of the Swedish Armed Forces Helicopter Wing and a year later he was appointed commanding officer of the same wing. In 2008, Svensson was promoted to brigadier general and was appointed deputy chief of the Air Component Command at the Swedish Armed Forces Headquarters. In July 2009, Svensson was appointed head of Core Planning Team and Exercise Director for Exercise VIKING 11 at the Swedish Armed Forces Headquarters and in June 2011 he became acting commanding officer of Air Force Department of the Swedish Armed Forces Training & Development Staff (Produktionsledningens flygvapenavdelning).

In 2012, Svensson was appointed commanding officer of the Air Force Department of the Swedish Armed Forces Training & Development Staff and in 2013 he was promoted to major general and in October 2013 he was appointed director of the Systems and Production Management Division and Deputy National Armaments Director at the Defence Materiel Administration. On 14 December 2016, Svensson was appointed Chief of Armed Forces Training & Procurement at the Swedish Armed Forces Headquarters and took office on 1 March 2017. He was at the same time promoted to lieutenant general.

== Personal life ==
Svensson is married to Gita and they have two sons.

== Dates of rank ==
- 1984 – Second lieutenant
- 1985 – Lieutenant
- 1988 – Captain
- 1991 – Major
- 1998 – Lieutenant colonel
- 2004 – Colonel
- 2008 – Brigadier general
- 2013 – Major general
- 1 March 2017 – Lieutenant general

== Awards and decorations ==
- (Sweden) For Zealous and Devoted Service of the Realm
- (Sweden) Swedish Armed Forces Conscript Medal
- (Sweden) Home Guard Medal of Merit
- (Sweden) Helicopter Wing Gold Medal of Merit (Helikopterflottiljens förtjänstmedalj i guld)
- (Sweden) Svea Artillery Regiment Medal of Merit (Svea artilleriregementes förtjänstmedalj, SveaartregGM/SM)
- (Sweden) Svea Artillery Regiment Commemorative Medal (Svea artilleriregementes minnesmedalj, SveartregSMM)

etc

== Honours ==
- Member of the Royal Swedish Academy of War Sciences (17 May 2017)

Military offices
Preceded by Mats Westin	Swedish Armed Forces Helicopter Wing; 2005–2008	Succeeded by Micael Bydén
Preceded by Anders Silwer	Deputy Chief, Air Component Command; 2008–2009	Succeeded by None
Preceded by Anders Silwer	Chief of Armed Forces Training & Procurement; 2017–2022	Succeeded by None
