= Air Component Command =

- Flygvapnets taktiska stab
- Active: 1994–2018
- Country: Sweden
- Allegiance: Swedish Armed Forces
- Branch: Swedish Air Force
- Type: Military staff
- Role: Operational, territorial and tactical operations
- Size: Staff
- Part of: Swedish Armed Forces Headquarters
- Garrison/HQ: Stockholm
- March: "Flygvapnets paradmarsch" (Sernklef)

The Air Component Command (Swedish: Flygvapnets taktiska stab, FTS) was a part of the Joint Forces Command of the Swedish Armed Forces. The staff was located at the Swedish Armed Forces Headquarters in Stockholm. The Air Component Command commanded the operations of the Swedish Air Force.

== History ==
On 30 June 1994, the Air Staff was dissolved and ceased as a staff and authority. In its place, on 1 July 1994, the Air Force Command (Flygvapenledningen) was formed in the newly established Swedish Armed Forces Headquarters and the Air Tactical Center (Flygvapnets taktiska centrum) in Linköping. The Air Force Command, which was part of the newly established Swedish Armed Forces Headquarters, was a production unit which sorted directly under the authority of the head of the agency, that is, the Supreme Commander. The Air Force Tactical Center was in turn directly subordinate of the military commander of the Middle Military District (Milo M).

On 1 July 1998, the Air Force Tactical Center, along with the Air Force Command, was reorganized and formed the Air Force Center (Flygvapencentrum, FlygvapenC) and the Chief of Air Force Staff position was replaced by the Inspector General of the Air Force position on 30 June 1998 who became the commander of the Air Force Center. The Swedish Air Force' highest command was now localized to Uppsala.

The Defence Act of 2000 meant that more than 20 units and some 20 staffs were disbanded which were reduced to six. The Defence Act also resulted in the Air Force Center being disbanded as an independent staff, and instead, the Air Force Center, as of 1 July 2000, came to operate as the Air Force Tactical Command (Flygvapnets taktiska kommando, FTK). The Air Force Tactical Command was one of three tactical commands within the Joint Forces Command (OPIL). On 1 January 2003, the position the Inspector General of the Air Force position was changed to Inspector of the Air Force.

On 1 April 2007, the command was reorganized, and it received it current name was the Air Component Command (Flygvapnets taktiska stab, FTS). The Air Component Command was then organized under Joint Forces Command. In 2007, the Swedish Air Force's highest command was again re-located to Stockholm. Since 1 January 2014, there is once again a position like Chief of Air Force, this time in the Swedish Armed Forces Headquarters's Training & Procurement Staff (Produktionsstaben).

In February 2018, the Swedish Armed Forces proposed in its budget for 2019 to the Government a reorganization of the command structure. The proposal was, among other things, designed with a new command and new organizational units in new locations. This was to provide better conditions for a robust and sustainable command. The new organizational units that the Swedish Armed Forces wanted to form were proposed to be named the Army Staff, the Air Staff and the Naval Staff. These would be formed by a merger of the Training & Procurement Staff and the Joint Forces Command, as well as other complementary parts from the Swedish Armed Forces Headquarters and the Defence Materiel Administration. The staffs were proposed to be formed on 1 January 2019 and commanded by an army chief, a naval chief and an air force chief.

== Heraldry and traditions ==
=== Coat of arms ===
The coat of the arms of the Air Tactical Center 1994–1997. Blazon: "Chequey or and azure, a chief azure charged with a winged two-bladed propeller or."

The coat of the arms of the Air Component Command 2007–2018. It was used by Air Staff 1937–1994, the Air Force Command 1994–1997, the Air Force Tactical Center 1997–1998, the Air Force Center 1998–2000 and the Air Force Tactical Command 2000–2007. Blazon: "Azure, a winged two-bladed propeller or".

Coat of the arms of the Air Force Tactical Center (FTC) 1994–1997.

Coat of arms of the Air Staff 1979–1994, the Air Force Command 1994–1997, the Air Force Tactical Center 1997–1998, the Air Force Center 1998–2000, the Air Force Tactical Command 2000–2007 and the Air Component Command 2007–2018.

== Commanding officers ==
=== Flygvapenledningen (1994–1998) ===
==== Chiefs ====
- 1 July 1994–30 30 September 1994: Lieutenant general Lars-Erik Englund
- 1 October 1994–30 June 1998: Lieutenant general Kent Harrskog

==== Deputy Chiefs ====
- 1995–1997: Senior colonel Curt Westberg

=== Flygvapnets taktiska centrum (1994–1998) ===
==== Chiefs ====
- 1994–1997: Jan Jonsson
- 1997–2000: Anders Johansson
- 2000–2000: Lennart Brodin

=== Flygvapencentrum (1998–2000) ===
==== Chiefs ====
- 1 July 1998–30 June 2000: Major general Jan Jonsson

==== Deputy Chiefs ====
- 1998–2000: Senior colonel Owe Wagermark (Note: Also Deputy Inspector General of Air Force.)

=== Flygtaktiska kommandot (2000–2007) ===
==== Chiefs ====
- 1 July 2000–1 December 2002: Major general Mats Nilsson
- 1 January 2003–2006: Brigadier general Lennart Pettersson
- 2006–2007: Brigadier general Anders Silwer

==== Deputy Chiefs ====
- 2000–2002: Brigadier general Jan Andersson (Note: Also Deputy Inspector General of Air Force until 2001.)
- 2003–2004: Colonel Anders Silwer
- 2004–2007: Colonel Bengt Christer Olofsson

=== Flygtaktiska stabsledningen (2007–2018) ===
==== Chiefs ====
- 2007–2008: Major general Jan Andersson
- 2008–2011: Major general Anders Silwer
- 2012–2013: Major general Micael Bydén
- 2013–2013: Colonel Anders Persson (acting between 14 October 2013 and 31 December 2013)
- 2013–2018: Brigadier general Gabor Nagy
- 2018–2018: Brigadier general Carl-Johan Edström

==== Deputy Chiefs ====
- 2007–2008: Major general Anders Silwer
- 2008–2009: Brigadier general Johan Svensson

== Names, designations and locations ==
Name	Translation	From		To
Flygvapenledningen	Air Force Command	1994-07-01	–	1998-06-30
Flygvapnets taktiska centrum	Air Force Tactical Center	1994-07-01	–	1998-06-30
Flygvapencentrum	Air Force Center	1998-07-01	–	2000-06-30
Flygvapnets taktiska kommando	Air Force Command	2000-07-01	–	2007-03-31
Flygvapnets taktiska stab	Air Component Command	2007-04-01	–	2018-12-31
Designation		From		To
FVL/FTC		1994-07-01	–	1998-06-30
FlygvapenC		1998-07-01	–	2000-06-30
FTK		2000-07-01	–	2007-03-31
FTS		2007-04-01	–	2018-12-31
Location		From		To
Stockholm Garrison		1994-07-01	–	1997-12-31
Linköping Garrison		1998-01-01	–	1998-06-30
Uppsala Garrison		1998-07-01	–	2007-??-??
Stockholm Garrison		2007-??-??	–	2018-12-31
