= Chief of Air Force (Sweden) =

Most senior appointment in the Swedish Air Force

- Flygvapenchef
- Command flag of the Chief of Air Force.

- Incumbent; Major General Jonas Wikman since 14 December 2022
- Swedish Air Force
- Abbreviation: FVC
- Reports to: Chief of Armed Forces Training & Procurement
- Seat: Lidingövägen 24, Stockholm, Sweden
- Nominator: Minister for Defence
- Appointer: The Government
- Constituting instrument: FIB 2020:5, Chapter 13 a
- Formation: 1 July 1926
- First holder: Karl Amundson
- Deputy: Deputy Chief of Air Force

Chief of Air Force (Swedish: Flygvapenchef, FVC) is the most senior appointment in the Swedish Air Force. The position Chief of Air Force was introduced in 1926 and the current form in 2014.

== History ==
The position and the staff agency "Chief of the Air Force" (Swedish: Chefen för flygvapnet, C FV) was created for a central leadership of the Air Force in peacetime through the formation of the Swedish Air Force as an independent military branch which took place on 1 July 1926. Following a larger reorganization of the Swedish Armed Forces in 1994, the staff agency Chief of the Air Force ceased to exist as an independent agency. Instead, the post Chief of Air Force Command (Swedish: Chefen för flygvapenledningen, C FVL) was created at the then newly instituted Swedish Armed Forces Headquarters. In 1998, the Swedish Armed Forces was again reorganized. Most of the duties of the Chief of Air Force Command were transferred to the newly instituted post of "Inspector General of the Air Force" (Swedish: Generalinspektören för flygvapnet, GI FV). The post is similar to that of the "Inspector General of the Army" (Swedish: Generalinspektören för armén) and the "Inspector General of the Navy" (Swedish: Generalinspektören för marinen).

The Inspector General had two roles, partly to be head of the Air Force Center, and partly to be the main representative of the Air Force. The meaning of the latter task was that the Inspector General was the air force's figurehead both towards the air force personnel and within the Swedish Armed Forces in general and towards society and the outside world. As commander, he would represent everyone who has their work in the air force. To be able to solve this task, the Inspector General was part of the Swedish Armed Forces' senior command – the Military Command (Militärledningen). In this he represented the air force but also had an important role as an "independent" adviser to the Supreme Commander of the Swedish Armed Forces. The Inspector General also played an important representative role in connection with the then increasing international operations. He represented the air force in connection with various forms of high-level visits within and outside the country. He also served as host when other nations' air force commanders visited Sweden.

The Inspector General was later renamed "Inspector of the Air Force" (Swedish: Flygvapeninspektören, FVI). On 1 January 2014, the "Chief of Air Force" (Swedish: Flygvapenchefen, FVC) position was reinstated in the Swedish Armed Forces. The position has not the same duties as before.

== Tasks ==
Tasks of the Chief of Air Force:

- Lead the units which the Chief of Swedish Armed Forces Training and Development has distributed
- To the Chief of Swedish Armed Forces Training and Development propose the development of the units' abilities
- Being the foremost representative of the units
- Represent the units and the area of ability in international contacts

== Heraldry ==
The command flag of the Chief of Air Force is drawn by Brita Grep and embroidered by hand by the company Libraria. Blazon: "Fessed in yellow and blue; on yellow two blue batons of command with sets of open yellow crowns placed two and one in saltire, on blue a winged two-bladed yellow propeller."

== List of chiefs ==
No.	Portrait	Name	Took office	Left office	Time in office	Ref.
Chief of the Air Force (Chefen för flygvapnet, C FV)
1	Karl Amundson	Major general Karl Amundson (1873–1938)	1 July 1926	25 February 1931	4 years, 239 days	-
2	Eric Virgin	Major general Eric Virgin (1876–1950)	26 February 1931	30 June 1934	3 years, 124 days	-
3	Torsten Friis	Major general Torsten Friis (1882–1967)	1 July 1934	30 June 1942	7 years, 364 days	-
4	Bengt Nordenskiöld	Lieutenant general Bengt Nordenskiöld (1891–1983)	1 July 1942	30 June 1954	11 years, 364 days	
5	Axel Ljungdahl	Lieutenant general Axel Ljungdahl (1897–1995)	1 July 1954	30 June 1960	5 years, 365 days	-
6	Torsten Rapp	Lieutenant general Torsten Rapp (1905–1993)	1 July 1960 (Note: Appointed on 15 January 1960 but didn't take office until 1 July 1960.)	30 September 1961	1 year, 91 days	
7	Lage Thunberg	Lieutenant general Lage Thunberg (1905–1977)	1 October 1961	30 September 1968	6 years, 273 days	
-	Claës-Henrik Nordenskiöld	Major general Claës-Henrik Nordenskiöld (1917–2003); Acting	1 July 1968	30 September 1968	91 days	-
8	Stig Norén	Lieutenant general Stig Norén (1908–1996)	1 October 1968	30 September 1973	4 years, 364 days	-
9	Dick Stenberg	Lieutenant general Dick Stenberg (1921–2004)	1 October 1973	30 September 1982	8 years, 364 days	
10	Sven-Olof Olson	Lieutenant general Sven-Olof Olson (1926–2021)	1 October 1982	30 September 1988	5 years, 365 days	
11	Lars-Erik Englund	Lieutenant general Lars-Erik Englund (1934–2010)	1 October 1988	30 June 1994	5 years, 272 days	
Chief of Air Force Command (Chef för flygvapenledningen, C FVL)
11	Lars-Erik Englund	Lieutenant general Lars-Erik Englund (1934–2010)	1 July 1994	30 September 1994	91 days	
12	Kent Harrskog	Lieutenant general Kent Harrskog (born 1944)	1 October 1994	30 June 1998	3 years, 364 days	
Inspector General of the Air Force (Generalinspektör för flygvapnet, GI FV)
13	Jan Jonsson	Major general Jan Jonsson (1952–2021)	1 July 1998	30 June 2000	1 year, 365 days	
14	Mats Nilsson	Major general Mats Nilsson (born 1956)	1 July 2000	1 December 2002	2 years, 153 days	
Inspector of the Air Force (Flygvapeninspektör, FVI)
15	Jan Andersson	Major general Jan Andersson (born 1955)	1 January 2003	29 February 2008	5 years, 59 days	
16	Anders Silwer	Major general Anders Silwer (born 1959)	1 March 2008	31 December 2011	3 years, 305 days	
17	Micael Bydén	Major general Micael Bydén (born 1964)	1 January 2012	2014	1–2 years	
Chief of Air Force (Flygvapenchef, FVC)
17	Micael Bydén	Major general Micael Bydén (born 1964)	2014	30 September 2015	0–1 years	-
18	Mats Helgesson	Major general Mats Helgesson (born 1964)	1 October 2015	1 October 2019	4 years, 0 days	
19	Carl-Johan Edström	Major general Carl-Johan Edström (born 1967)	1 October 2019	13 December 2022	3 years, 73 days	
20	Jonas Wikman	Major general Jonas Wikman (born 1972)	14 December 2022	Incumbent	3 years, 267 days	

== List of deputy chiefs ==
Portrait	Name	Took office	Left office	Time in office	Ref.
Deputy Inspector General of Air Force (Ställföreträdande generalinspektör för flygvapnet)
Owe Wagermark	Senior colonel Owe Wagermark (born 1951)	1998	31 December 2000	1–2 years	
Jan Andersson	Brigadier general Jan Andersson (born 1955)	1 April 2001	31 December 2002	1–2 years	
Deputy Chief of Air Force (Ställföreträdande flygvapenchef)
Carl-Johan Edström	Brigadier general Carl-Johan Edström (born 1967)	1 January 2019	30 September 2019	272 days	
Anders Persson	Brigadier general Anders Persson (born 1968)	1 October 2019	August 2022	2–3 years	
Tommy Petersson [sv]	Brigadier general Tommy Petersson (born 1970)	1 August 2022	Incumbent	4 years, 37 days	

== See also ==
- Chief of Army (Sweden)
- Chief of Navy (Sweden)
