= Order of Aeronautical Merit (Brazil) =

- Type: State Order
- Awarded for: Distinguished service and exceptional contributions to the Brazilian Air Force.
- Country: Brazil
- Presented by: Brazilian Air Force
- Established: 1 November 1943

The Order of Aeronautical Merit (Portuguese: Ordem do Mérito Aeronáutico) is an award of the Brazilian Air Force, established on 1 November 1943 by President Getúlio Vargas. The order is presented in five grades and recognizes distinguished service and exceptional contributions to the Brazilian Air Force.

== Grades ==
The order is awarded in the following grades:

- Grand Cross (Grã-Cruz)
- Grand Officer (Grande Oficial)
- Commander (Comendador)
- Officer (Oficial)
- Knight (Cavaleiro)

== Notable recipients ==
- Air Chief Marshal Tanvir Mehmood Ahmed, Chief of Air Staff (2006–09), Pakistan Air Force
- Stéphane Abrial, French
- Micael Bydén, Sweden
- Ira C. Eaker, American
- Dwight D. Eisenhower, American, Grand Cross (August 5, 1946)
- Yuri Gagarin, Soviet
- Leonard T. Gerow, American
- Bruce K. Holloway, American
- Michael J. Hood, Canadian
- Jonas H. Ingram, American
- Jacques Paul Klein, American
- Curtis LeMay, American
- Luiz Inácio Lula da Silva, Brazilian
- Donald A. Quarles, American
- Guido Manini Ríos, Uruguay
- John Dale Ryan, American
- Michael E. Ryan, American
- Henri Sauvan, French

== See also ==
- List of aviation awards
