= Skaraborg Wing =

Coordinates: 58.4361°N 12.7200°E

- Skaraborgs flygflottilj
- Active: 1940–present
- Country: Sweden
- Allegiance: Swedish Armed Forces
- Branch: Swedish Air Force
- Type: Wing
- Role: Bomb wing (1943–1951); Attack wing (1951–1998); Fighter wing (1998–2004); School wing (2005–2015); Fighter wing (2016–)
- Garrison/HQ: Såtenäs
- Mottos: Vilja, kunnande, ära ("Will, knowledge, honor") (Note: The motto was adopted on 30 September 1985 by then wing commander, Colonel Björn Amelin. The Transport Squadron (Transportdivisionen) has a motto of their own; Vart som helst när som helst ("Anywhere anytime").)
- March: "The Solitaire" (Hållander) (Note: The march was adopted and established on 1 December 1972.)
- Engagements: Icelandic Air Policing
- Website: Official website

Commanders
- Current commander: COL Mattias Ottis

Insignia
- Roundel

Aircraft flown
- Attack: ~~A 21A~~, ~~A 21RA/B~~, ~~A 29B~~, ~~A 32A~~, ~~AJ 37~~, ~~AJS 37~~
- Bomber: ~~B 3~~, ~~B 5~~, ~~B 16~~, ~~B 17A/B/C~~, ~~B 18B~~
- Multirole helicopter: ~~Hk 2~~, ~~Hkp 9B~~, ~~Hkp 10A~~
- Trainer: ~~Sk 11~~, ~~Sk 12~~, ~~Sk 15~~, ~~Sk 16~~, ~~Sk 50~~, ~~Sk 60~~
- Transport: ~~Tp 9~~, ~~Tp 55~~, ~~Tp 79~~, ~~Tp 83~~, TP 84, TP 101
- ~~G 101~~, ~~Se 102~~, ~~Se 103~~, ~~Se 104~~, ~~JAS 39A/B~~, JAS 39C/D

Skaraborg Wing (Swedish: Skaraborgs flygflottilj), also F 7 Såtenäs, or simply F 7, is a Swedish Air Force wing with the main base located near Lidköping in south-central Sweden.

== History ==
The decision to set up the air wing was made in 1936, but disagreements in choosing a location delayed the commissioning. The Såtenäs estate was chosen for its good location and close proximity to suitable target ranges, and was purchased for 685,000 Swedish krona in 1938.

The first squadrons were set up with B 16A Caproni purchased from Italy at the start of World War II. These wooden framed aircraft were not suitable for the Nordic climate and soon got the nickname "flying coffins". They were replaced in 1941 by the Swedish B 17A that served throughout the war.

In 1946, the three bomber squadrons were converted to attack squadrons with the introduction of A 21, although for a brief number of years between 1948 and 1951, B 18 medium bombers were transferred from the Västmanland Wing (F 1).

The wing converted to jet aircraft in 1951 receiving A 21R converted from fighter to attack role from the Scania Wing (F 10). These were only kept for three years until the introduction of A 29B Tunnan in 1954. After only two years, they were in turn replaced by the new A 32A in 1956.

In 1964, a new transport squadron was set up with the introduction of the Tp 84 Hercules. Initially, only one aircraft was purchased, but a total of eight were introduced between 1965 and 1985. They are currently being used in international transport of Swedish Armed Forces. The first example acquired (84001) was withdrawn from use on 9 June 2014, with the second scheduled to follow within the year.

In 1973 the AJ 37 Viggen replaced the A 32, and the number of attack squadrons was reduced from three to two. The Viggens served until 1993, when one squadron was converted to the new JAS 39 Gripen. The second squadron followed suit in 1998.

F 7 is the main center for the entire Gripen system, and all training of pilots (including that of foreign operators) is carried out here.

== Barracks and training areas ==
=== Barracks ===
The former privately owned estate Tun in Såtenäs on the southeastern part of Lake Vänern was purchased by the state in 1938. Later, additional land was purchased. The wing has two crossing runways.

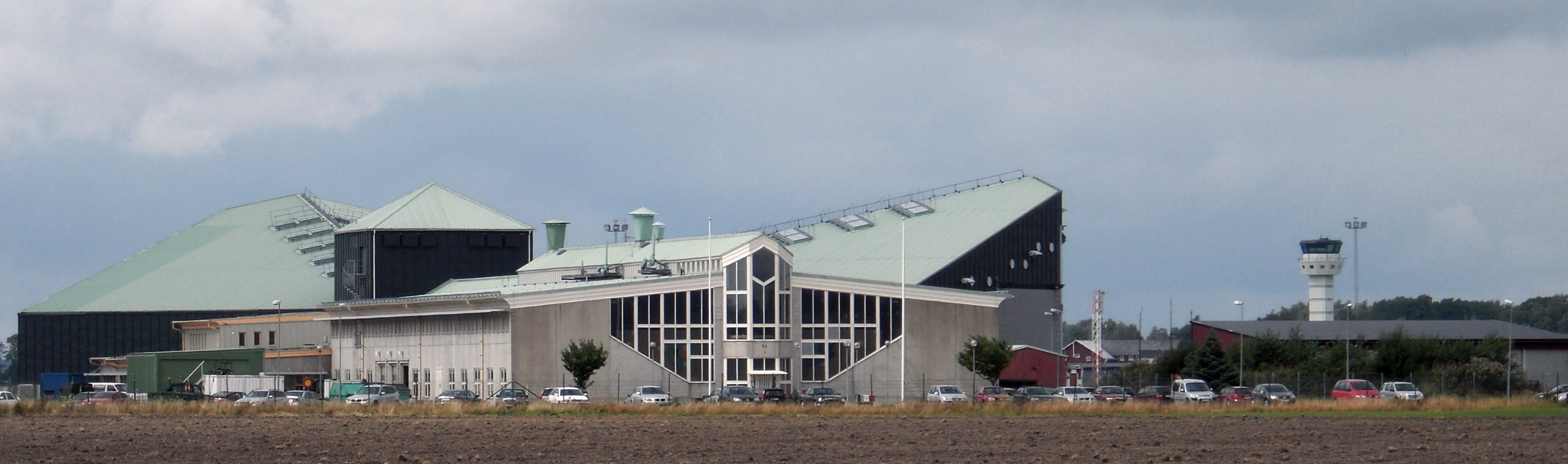
The main hangar

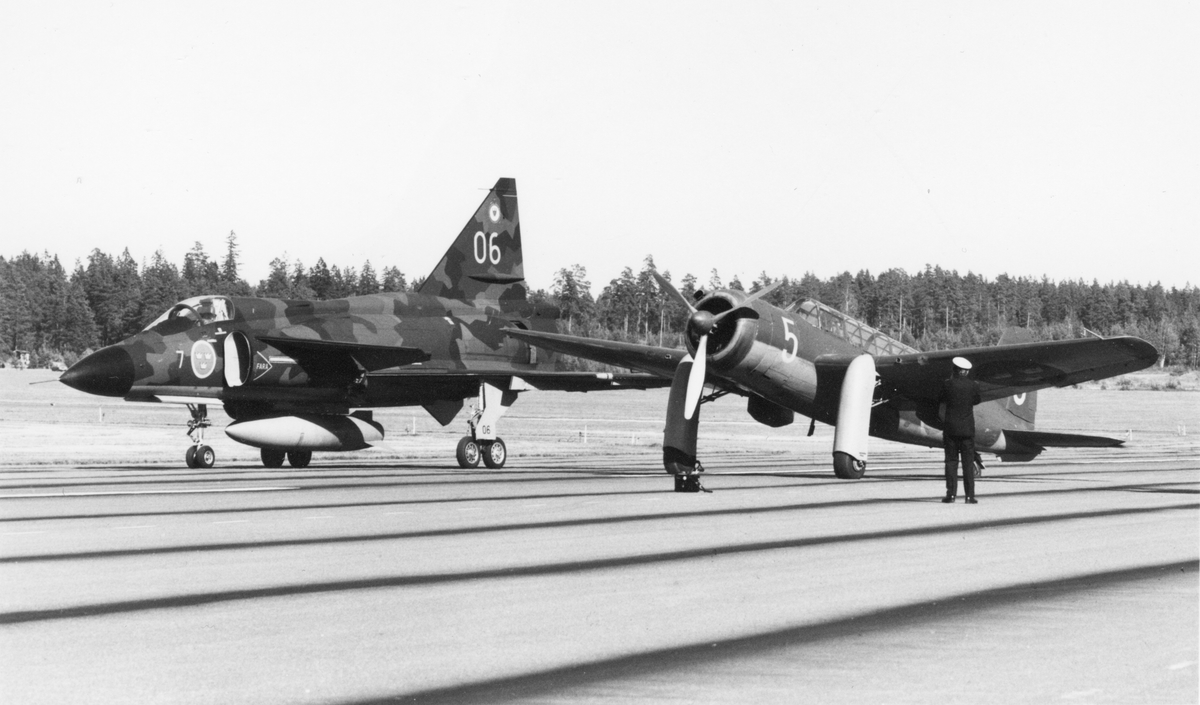
A Saab 37 Viggen and a Saab 17 in 1975

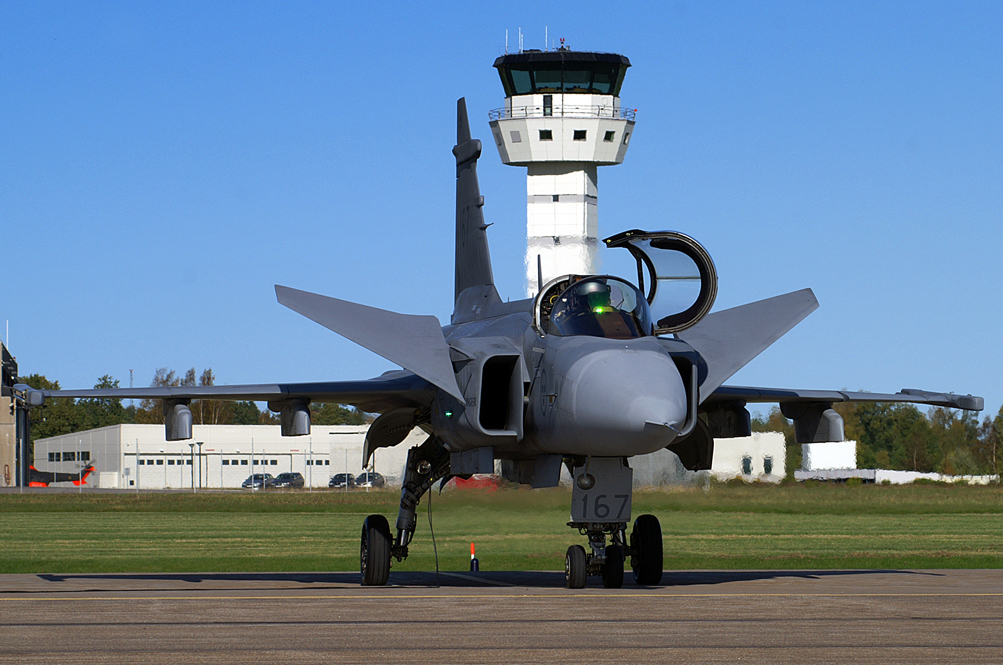
A Saab JAS 39 Gripen and the control tower

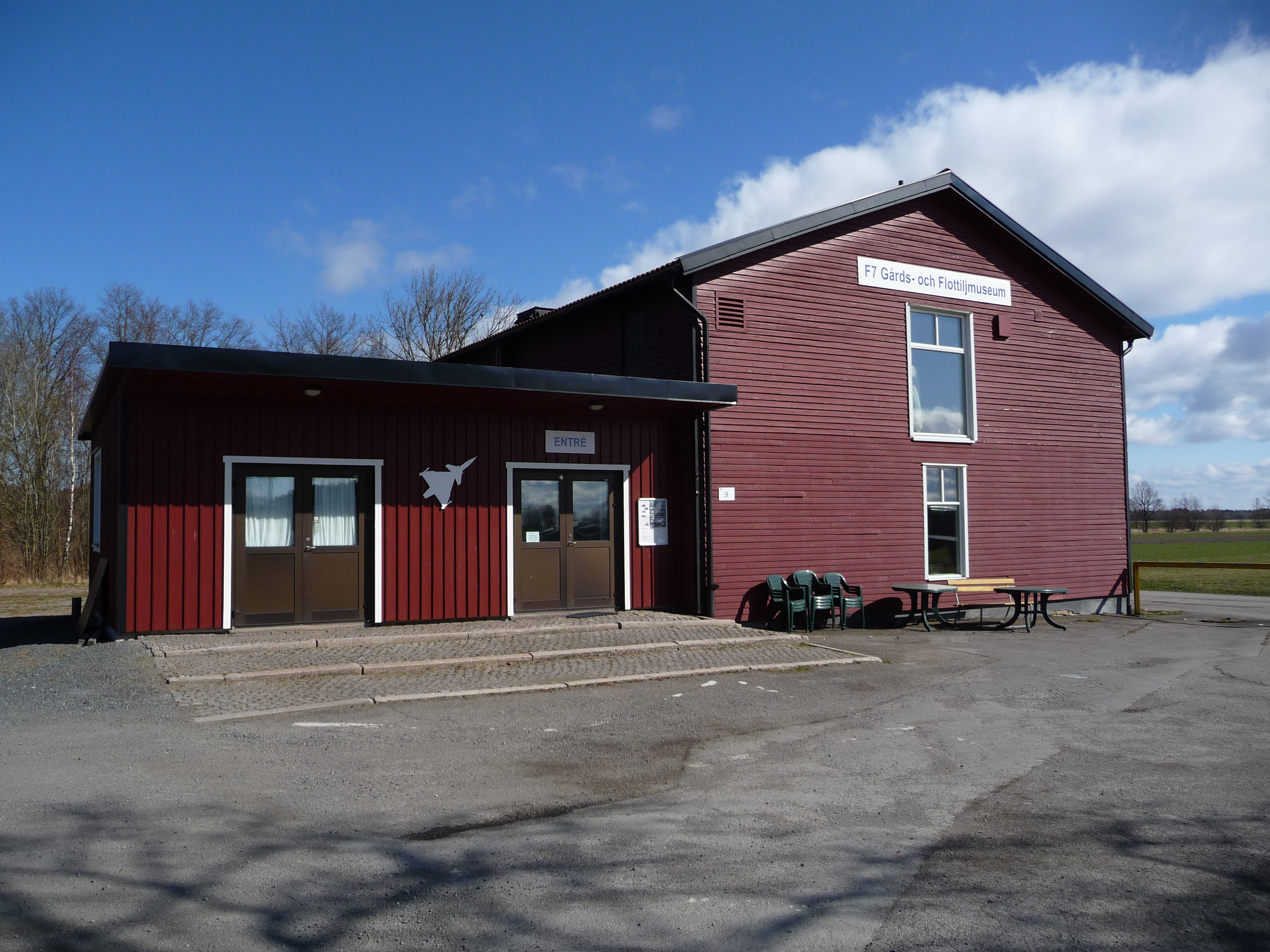
Museum

=== Training areas ===
Hattefuran in Lake Vänern.

== Heraldry and traditions ==
=== Coat of arms ===
The first coat of arms of the Skaraborg Wing was used from 1940 to 1994. Blazon: "Per bend sinister sable and or a lion rampant counterchanged, armed and langued gules." The current coat of arms has been used since 1994. Blazon: "The provincial badge of Västergötland, per bend sinister sable and or, a lion rampant counterchanged, armed and langued gules between two estoiles argent in the first field, a chief azure over a string or, charged with a winged two-bladed propeller or.

Coat of arms used from 1940 to 1994.

Coat of arms since 1994.

=== Colours, standards and guidons ===
The colour was presented to the wing at Såtenäs by His Royal Highness Prince Gustaf Adolf in 1943. The colour is drawn by Brita Grep and embroidered by hand in insertion technique by the Kedja studio. Blazon: "On blue cloth in the centre the badge of the Air Force; a winged two-bladed propeller under a royal crown proper, all in yellow. In the first corner the lion of the provincial badge of Västergötland; bended sinister in yellow and white, armed and langued red."

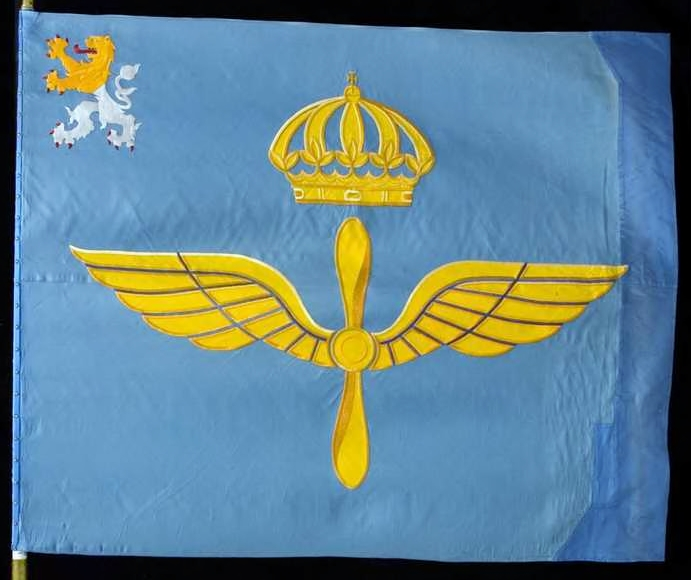
Colour model 1939

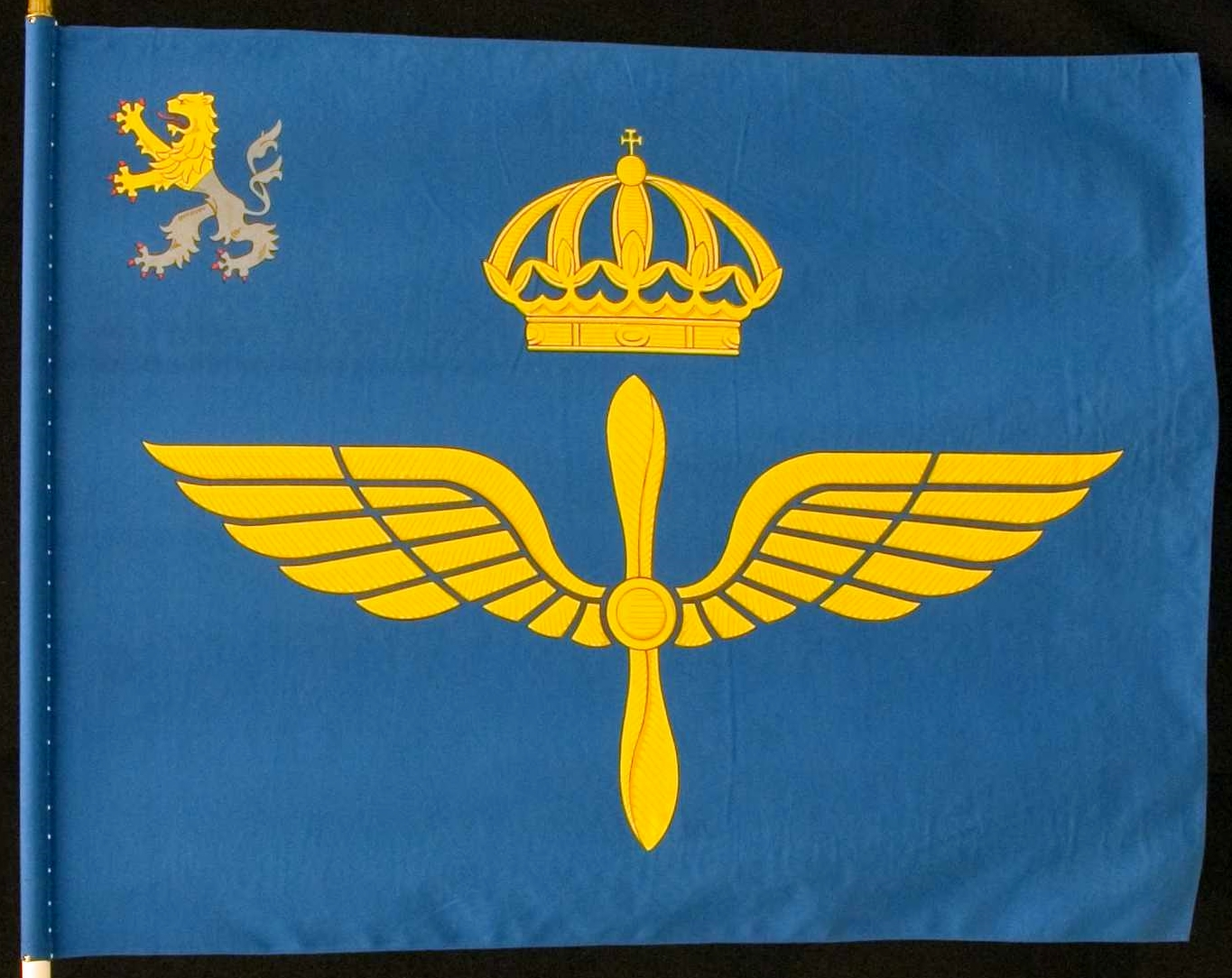
The 1986 colour.

=== March ===
”The Solitaire” was composed by Sverker Hållander and was adopted on 1 December 1972. One unofficial march, the ”Transportflygenhetens marsch” was composed by Kurt Westerling.

== Commanding officers ==
The commanding officer was referred to as flottiljchef ("wing commander") from 1940 to 1974 and had the rank of colonel. The commanding officer was referred to as sektorflottiljchef ("sector wing commander") from 1976 to 1981 and had the rank of senior colonel. His deputy was sometimes referred to as flottiljchef ("wing commander"). These latter are not listed in the list below. The commanding officer is since 1994 referred to as flottiljchef ("wing commander") and has the rank of colonel.

=== Commanders ===
- 1940–1945: Folke Ramström
- 1945–1950: Ingvar Berg
- 1950–1957: Stig Norén
- 1957–1958: Åke Sundén
- 1958–1968: Folke Barkman
- 1968–1972: Bengt Lehander
- 1972–1978: Karl-Erik Fernander
- 1978–1985: Björn Amelin
- 1985–1993: Stig Abrahamsson
- 1993–1998: Krister Backryd
- 1998–2001: Jan Andersson
- 2001–2005: Fredrik Hedén
- 2006–2008: Ingemar Adolfsson
- 2009–2013: Ingela Mathiasson
- 2013–2013: Per Danielsson
- 2013–2016: Michael Cherinet
- 2016–2019: Lars Helmrich
- 2019–2022: Malin Persson
- 2022–2025: Adam Nelson
- 2025–20xx: Mattias Ottis

=== Deputy commanders ===
- 2003 – 2003-12-31: Colonel Ingela Mathiasson
- 2004-01-01 – 2006: Lieutenant colonel Ingemar Adolfsson
- 2019–2022: Colonel Adam Nelson
- 2022–2025: Colonel Mattias Ottis
- 2025–20xx: Colonel Niclas Berger

== Names, designations and locations ==
Name	Translation	From		To
Kungl. Värmlands flygflottilj	Royal Värmland Wing	1936-??-??	–	1938-??-??
Kungl. Göta flygflottilj	Royal Göta Wing	1938-??-??	–	1940-??-??
Kungl. Skaraborgs flygflottilj	Royal Skaraborg Wing	1940-07-01	–	1974-12-31
Skaraborgs flygflottilj	Skaraborg Wing; Skaraborg Air Group	1975-01-01	–	
Designation		From		To
F 7		1940-07-01	–	1969-06-30
F 7/Se W2		1969-07-01	–	1981-06-30
F 7		1981-07-01	–	
Location		From		To
Såtenäs Airport		1940-07-01	–	

== See also ==
- Swedish Armed Forces
- Swedish Air Force
- List of military aircraft of Sweden
