= Air Staff (Sweden) =

Headquarters and staff of the Chief of the Swedish Air Force

- Flygstaben
- Coat of arms of the Swedish Air Staff.
- Active: 1936–1994, 2019–present
- Country: Sweden
- Allegiance: Swedish Armed Forces
- Branch: Swedish Air Force
- Type: Staff
- Role: Operational, territorial and tactical operations
- Garrison/HQ: Uppsala
- March: "Vingar av frihet" (Jerker Johansson) (Note: The Air Staff's newly composed march, "Vingar av frihet" by Jerker Johansson is from 2020. Until 1994, the Air Staff's marsch was "Flygvapnets paradmarsch" by Sernklef.)

Commanders
- Chief of Staff: Col Niclas Magnusson

Air Staff (Swedish: Flygstaben, FS) is the staff of the Chief of the Swedish Air Force. It was officially established in 1936 due to the Defence Act of 1936 and would handle matters of a general nature. The Air Staff's duties included, among other things, assisting the Chief of the Air Force with the leadership of the Air Force's mobilization, training, tactics, organization, equipment, and personnel to the extent that such activity was not directly related to operational activities, which the Defence Staff then handled. In 1994, the Swedish Armed Forces Headquarters took over the Air Staff's duties. In 2019, the Air Force Staff was re-established in Uppsala Garrison.

== History ==
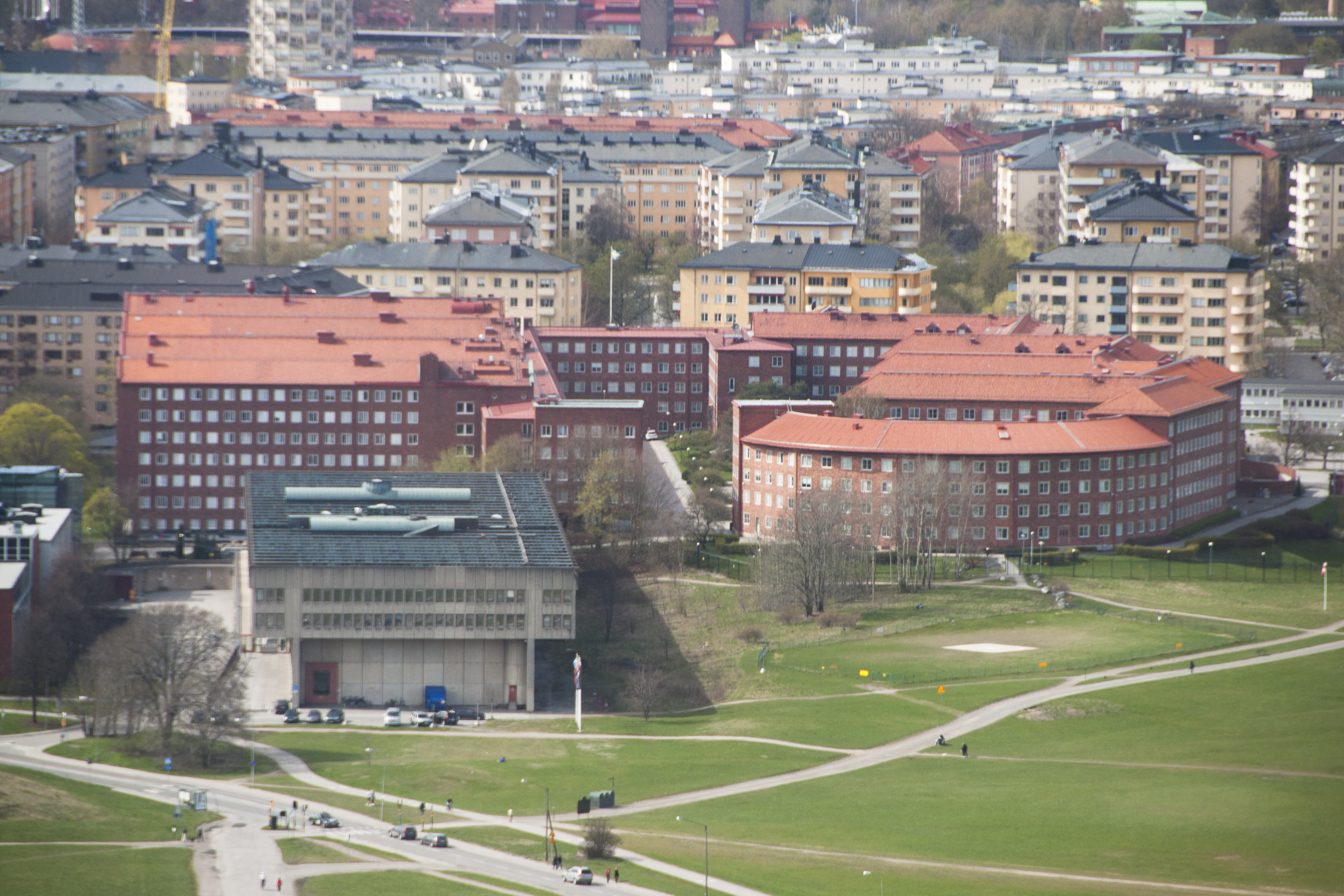
The Air Staff was located in these red buildings at Banérgatan 62-64 from 1943 to 1981.

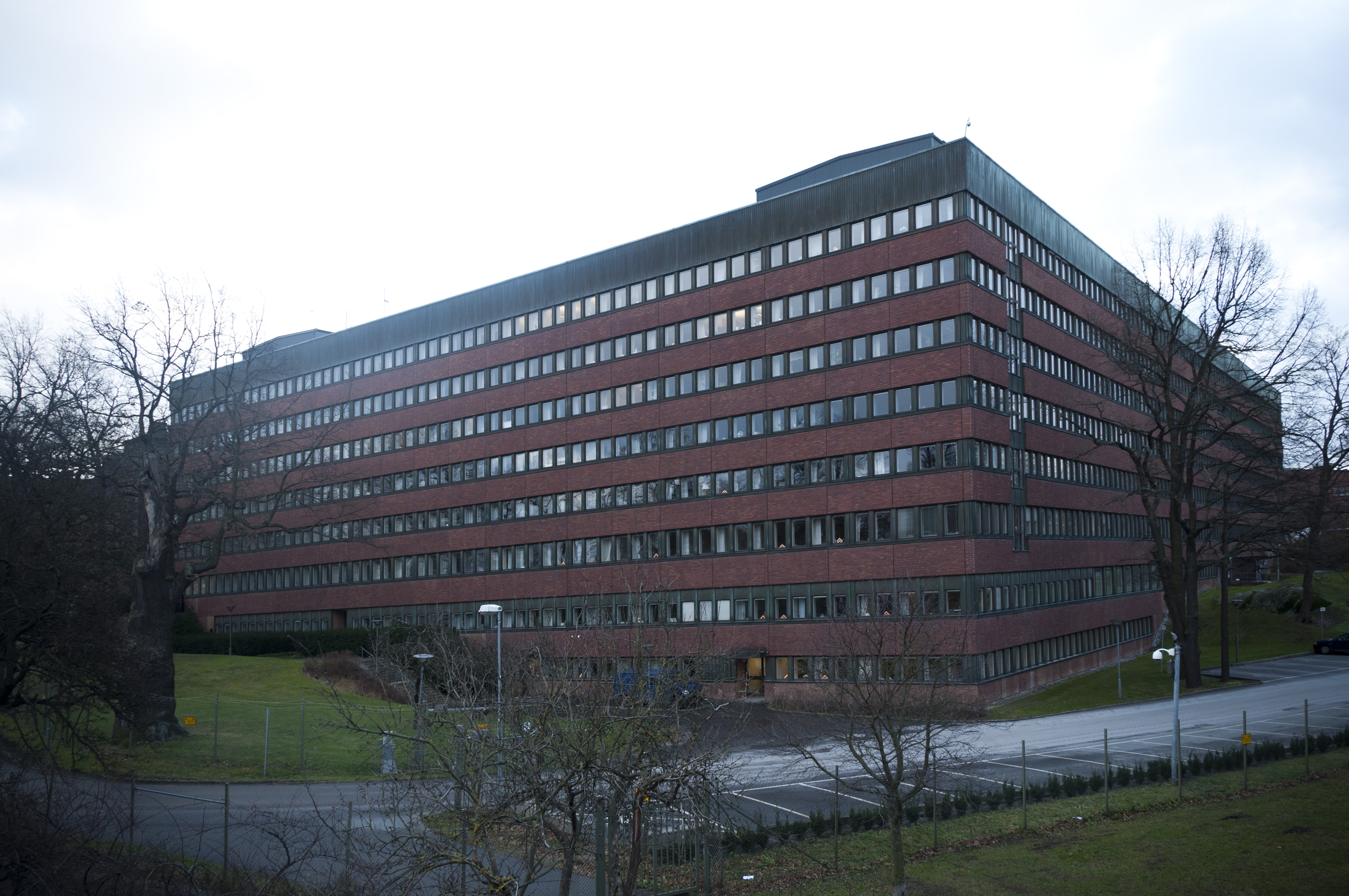
It was located at Lidingövägen 24 from 1981 to 1994.

When the position of the Chief of the Air Force was created in 1925, it had several officers at its disposal. The Chief of the Air Force's staff was organized in 1933 into three departments: I (organization, air forces use), II (training and personnel matters), and III (intelligence about foreign air forces, etc.). The Air Staff was organized on 1 July 1936 with the following organizations: Office (1936–1964), Organization Department (1936–), Education Department (1936–), Operation Department (1936–), Operation Department (1936–1964), Aviation Department (1936–1938) and the Intelligence Department (from 1936 to 1937, when its duties were transferred to the Defence Staff). In 1937, a press officer was added; in 1942, a Press Section; in 1957, a Press Detail; and in 1964, a Press Department.

In 1942, a Flight Safety and Accident Department (1942–1964) was added, then transferred to the Inspector of Flight Security (Inspektören för flygsäkerhetstjänsten) and a Signal and Weather Department (1942–1944). The latter was divided 1944 into a Signal Department (1944–1957) and a Weather Department (1944–) for the Armed Forces, a joint weather center. In 1945, a Human Resources Department (1945) was added, and in 1948, a Cash Department (1948–1957). The Signal Department was 1957 renamed the Telecom Department (1957–1964). A Planning Department (1957–) and an Intelligence Department were added the same year.

In July 1964, the Air Staff was reorganized, and sections were introduced. Subordinate to the Chief was the Chief Head Office (1964–1975), the Planning Department, and the Weather Department (in 1968 transferred to the Inspector of the Weather Service). Section 1 consisted of the Central Department, Signal Communications Department, Traffic Department, and the Intelligence Department (from circa 1975 the Intelligence Department (from circa 1975 the Intelligence and Security Department). Section II consisted of the Organizational Department, Education Department, Personnel Department, and the Press Department (from 1973 the Information Department) and from 1968 by an ADB (EDP) Department and from 1976 of the Land (Warfare) Inspection (1976–).

The next major reorganization was in July 1981. The Air Staff was, from now on, called the Chief of the Air Force (Chefen för flygvapnet, CFV). After this reorganization, the Air Staff comprised the Chief, Planning Section FS1, System Section FS2, Human Resources Section FS3 and Education Section FS4, Organic Unit Inspection, Flight Safety Section, Weather Service Management and Administration Department. The Air Staff has also included other units: the Surgeon-in-Chief of the Swedish Air Force with predecessors (1931–1969), Inspector of the Flying Safety Service (flygsäkerhetsinspektören) (1949–), Inspection of Air Surveillance (1948–1964), Inspection for Technical Services (1948–1960), Land Warfare Inspection (1956–1964), the Inspection of Base Service (1960–1964), the Inspection of the Air Force's Volunteer Activities (1961–1964), the Air Force Personnel Delegation (1959–1964), the System Inspector (1964–1981), the Inspector of Weather Service (1968–1981) and the Organic Unit Inspection (1981–).

In March 1976, the Air Staff had about 370 employees. Because of the reorganization in 1981, the Air Staff's workforce declined from approximately 315 to 225. he last management meeting of the Air Staff occurred on 26 March 1993. The Air Staff was, in connection with the Swedish Armed Forces restructuring on 1 July 1994, amalgamated into the Swedish Armed Forces Headquarters as the Air Force Command.

== Location ==
The main part of the Air Staff was from 1943 to 1981, located in the building Tre Vapen at Banérgatan 62-64 and at six other places in the Stockholm area. In 1981, it moved to the building Bastionen at Lidingövägen 24 in Stockholm.

The location of the new Air Staff was proposed by the Swedish Armed Forces to be established in Uppsala garrison. The staff will move into three larger white buildings in the area's southern part, initially erected in the 1940s for the Royal Swedish Air Force College (Flygkadettskolan, F 20). There were two wings with cadet dwellings and a building with lecture halls and administrative premises. Upstairs there was a hall which was also used for parties. A few hundred meters north of the schoolhouse lay the cadet mess, a low white building.

== Heraldry ==
The coat of arms of the Air Staff was used from 1937 and 1994. It was later used by the Air Force Command 1994–1997, Air Force Tactical Center 1997–1998, Air Force Center 1998–2000 and the Air Force Tactical Command, 2000–2018. Blazon: "Azure, a winged two-bladed propeller or".

== Chiefs of the Air Staff ==
List of Chiefs of the Air Staff:

- 1936–1942: Bengt Nordenskiöld
- 1942–1947: Axel Ljungdahl
- 1947–1957: Gustaf Adolf Westring
- 1957–1960: Lennart Peyron
- 1960–1964: Stig Norén
- 1964–1966: Gösta Odqvist
- 1966–1970: Claës-Henrik Nordenskiöld
- 1970–1973: Dick Stenberg
- 1973–1978: Hans Neij
- 1978–1980: Erik Nygren
- 1980–1984: Evert Båge
- 1984–1987: Bengt Lönnbom
- 1987–1990: Bert Stenfeldt
- 1990–1994: Bernt Östh
- 1993–1994: Kjell Nilsson (acting)
- 2019–2019: Anders Persson
- 2019–2020: Anders Jönsson
- 2020–2025: Dennis Hedström
- 2025–present: Niclas Magnusson

== Vice Chiefs of the Air Staff ==
- 1943–1948: Karl Silfverberg
- 1948–1951: Torsten Rapp
- 1951–1953: Greger Falk
- 1953–1959: Stig Möller
- 1959–1961: Gösta Odqvist
- 1961–1966: Nils Personne

== Names, designations and locations ==
| Name | Translation | From | | To |
|---|---|---|---|---|
| Flygstaben | Air Staff | 1936-07-01 | – | 1994-06-30 |
| Flygstaben | Air Staff | 2019-01-01 | – | |
| Designation | | From | | To |
| FS | | 1936-07-01 | – | 1994-06-30 |
| FS | | 2019-01-01 | – | |
| Location | | From | | To |
| Stockholm Garrison | | 1936-07-01 | – | 1994-06-30 |
| Uppsala Garrison | | 2019-01-01 | – | |
