= Ljungbyhed =

- Location within Skåne Location within Sweden
- Coordinates: 56°04′N 13°13′E
- Country: Sweden
- Province: Skåne
- County: Skåne County
- Municipality: Klippan Municipality

Area
  - Total: 2.97 km^{2} (1.15 sq mi)

Population (31 December 2010)
  - Total: 2,046
  - Density: 689/km^{2} (1,780/sq mi)
- Time zone: UTC+1 (CET)
  - Summer (DST): UTC+2 (CEST)

Ljungbyhed is a locality situated in Klippan Municipality, Skåne County, Sweden, with 2,046 inhabitants in 2010.

== History ==
Ljungbyhed was and is located in Riseberga socken and was part of the Riseberga landskommun after the municipal reform of 1862. In this, Ljungbyheds municipalsamhälle was established on 21 December 1934, which was then dissolved on 31 December 1962.

Ljungbyhed was training ground for the North Scanian Infantry Regiment until 1923 and for the Scanian cavalry regiments. From 1925, Ljungbyhed became location for the 5th Air School Corps (5:e flygskolekåren). From 1926 to 1998, the Swedish Air Force Flying School was located in Ljungbyhed.

The Ljungbyheds Motorbana is a motorsport racetrack opened in 2016 at the airbase.
