= Brigadgeneral =

One-star commissioned officer rank in the Swedish Army

Brigadier General Brigadgeneral
- Country: Sweden
- Service branch: Army; Air Force; Amphibious Corps
- Abbreviation: Bgen (Swedish), BGen (English)
- Rank: One-star (Note: Major general was a one-star rank in the Swedish Armed Forces rank structure until 1972.)
- NATO rank code: OF-6
- Non-NATO rank: O-7
- Formation: 1 July 2000
- Next higher rank: Major general
- Next lower rank: Colonel (Note: Senior colonel is the actually the next lower rank but its obsolete since the introduction of the brigadier general rank in 2000.)
- Equivalent ranks: Rear admiral (lower half)

Brigadier General (BGen) (Swedish: Brigadgeneral, Bgen) is a one-star commissioned officer rank in the Swedish Army, Swedish Air Force and Swedish Amphibious Corps. A Brigadier general ranks immediately above a colonel and below a major general. The rank is equivalent to rear admiral (lower half) in the Swedish Navy.

== History ==
In 1972, the so-called employment reform (tjänstställningsreformen) was implemented. In connection with the Swedish Armed Forces' increasing involvement in international operations with UN battalions and observers, it became increasingly clear that the Swedish service system did not quite correspond to what was common in other countries. A Swedish captain had the same training and service as a major in other countries' defense forces. In many cases, a Swedish colonel had tasks that in other armed forces were performed by brigadier generals. During the 1960s, this was solved many times by the Swedish officers being given a higher rank during their service abroad. The Supreme Commander suggested to the Swedish government that the Swedish service system should be changed, so that the captains would receive the rank of major and the majors would receive the rank of lieutenant colonel. He further proposed that a new general, brigadier general, be introduced. The government approved the Supreme Commander's proposal regarding captains and majors. No new general rank was introduced. The motivation for the government not following the Supreme Commander's proposal in this respect was that it did not want to contribute to an increase in the number of generals and admirals in the Swedish Armed Forces. However, the government decided to introduce the rank of överste av 1. graden (senior colonel) for the army and kommendör av 1. graden (senior captain) for the navy. The reform was implemented on 1 July 1972.

During the 1990s, the Swedish government raised the issue of introducing a rank for professional officers called brigadier general and flotilla admiral, respectively, and stated there, among other things, the following. For a few years, the Swedish Armed Forces had in various ways announced that they wished to change the current rank level system for professional officers. The idea was that the rank of överste av 1. graden and kommendör av 1. graden would be abolished and instead replaced with the rank of brigadier general and rear admiral (lower half). The reason for this was stated to be that then almost only Sweden did not have this rank. The increased international cooperation was thus considered to have been made more difficult. Denmark, Norway and Finland had recently introduced the brigadier general's rank. The government stated in the same bill that the issue should be prepared further before a position was taken on the proposal. In 1999, the government stated that the said rank should now be introduced and intended to make changes to the bill (1994:642) with instructions for the Swedish Armed Forces and the Officers Ordinance (1994:882) with effect from 1 July 2000.

The rank was finally introduced in 2000 and replaced the old rank of överste av 1. graden. Anyone who, according to older regulations, held the rank of överste av 1. graden would continue to hold that rank until otherwise decided. Thus, the rank of överste av 1. graden was placed between the rank of brigadier general and the rank of colonel. Unlike major generals, lieutenant generals, vice admirals and rear admirals which are appointed by the government, brigadier generals are appointed by the Swedish Armed Forces. In everyday speech, generals of all ranks are addressed as generals.

The rank is translated officially by the Swedish Armed Forces to Brigadier General. However, almost all officers in this rank do not command brigades, regiments or battalions; but take up senior tasks related to administration, staff, education, and planning. Each of the (F)HQ units available (see Swedish Armed Forces) supports a unit which is commanded by a Brigadier General.

== Rank insignia ==
=== Collar patches ===
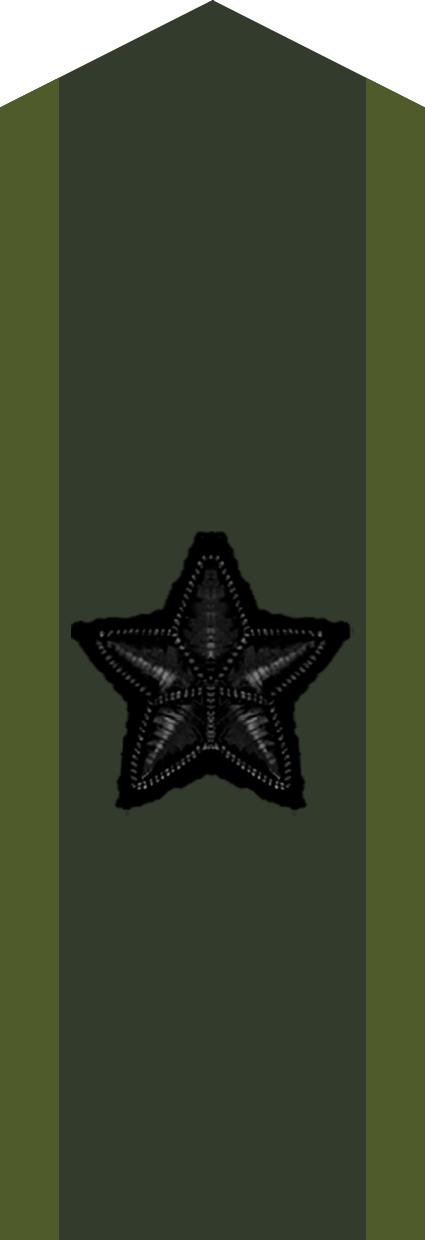
Collar patch on field uniform M90 for a brigadier general (Note: A brigadier general attaches 1 black star m/02 on KRAGSPEGEL M/58 ("Collar patch M/58"). The rank insignia is worn on the left collar (seen from the wearer) on a field jacket m/90 (armor and helicopter). Rank insignia is worn on the left side (seen from the wearer) of the chest on a field shirt with collar, t-shirt, warm jacket 90 and some special uniforms.)
(2002–present)

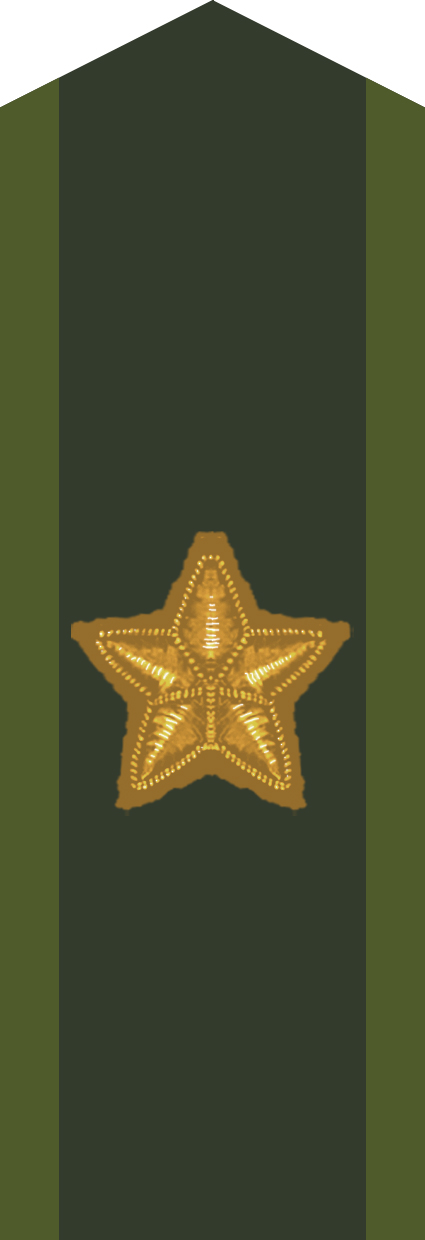
Collar patch m/58 (gold) on uniform m/58-m/59 and field uniform M90
(2000–2002)
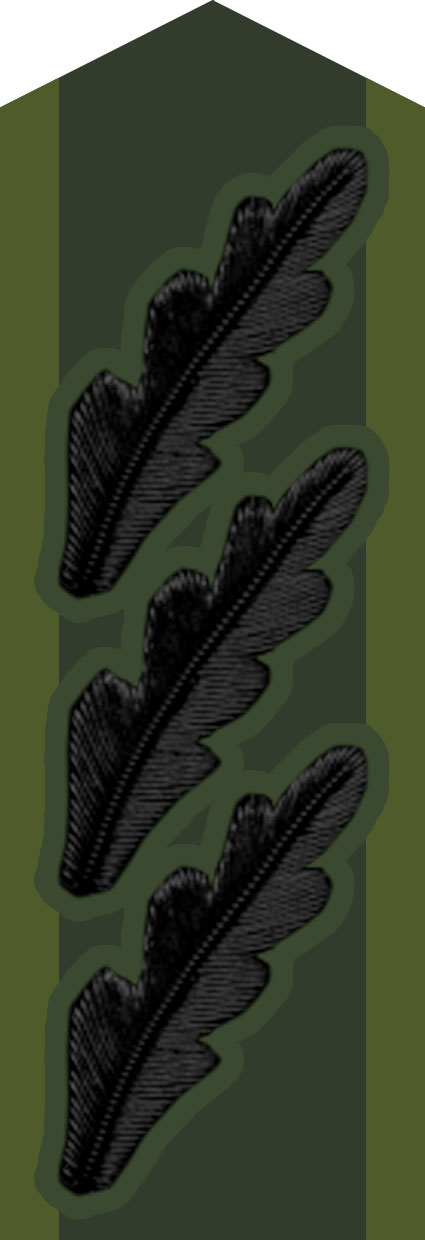
Collar patch on field uniform M90 for a general of any rank (Note: Three black oak leaves M/39-02 are worn on the right collar patch by a general officer and flag officer.)
(2002–present)

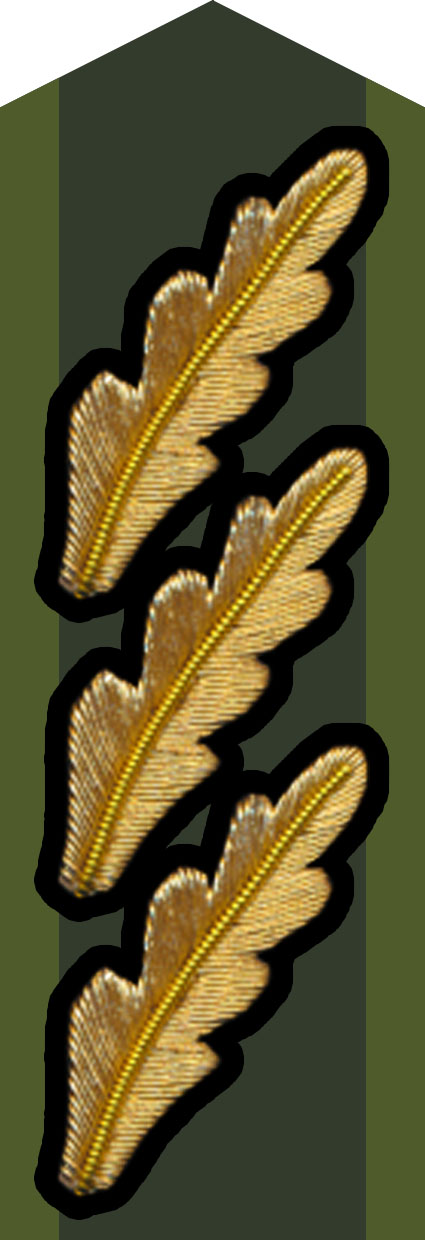
Collar patch on field uniform M90 for a general of any rank
(?–2002)

=== Shoulder marks ===
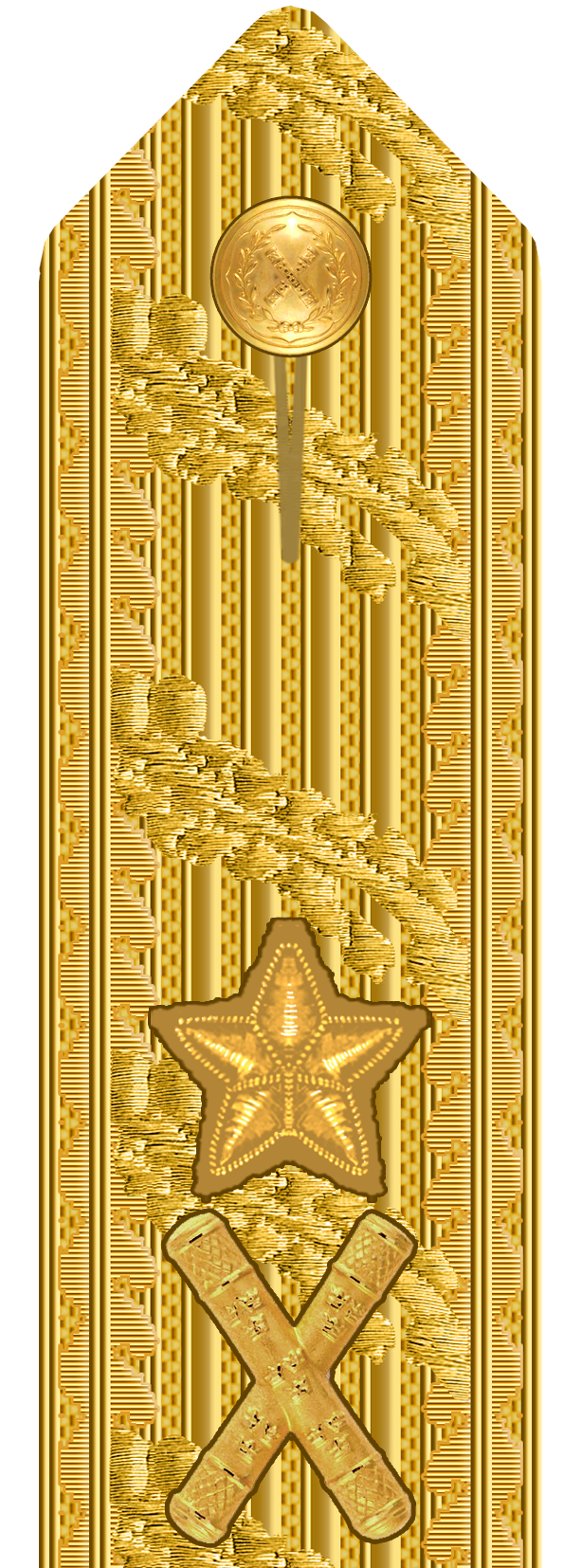
Shoulder mark (Army) (Note: The shoulder straps/casings are covered by a 45 mm gallon m/51. A brigadier general attaches one star M/1860. The distance between the star and the command badge m/39-60 (chefsgruppsemblem m/39-60) must be 5 mm. Rank insignia is worn on both shoulder straps for tunic, jacket and coat m/87 gray and mess jacket m/86. Rank insignia is worn on casings on m/87 (gray) to blue wool sweater m/87(S), trench coat m/84, sea coat 93, raincoat m/87 and white shirt m/78 (gray shirt m/87). The insignias are made of gold-colored metal/embroidery.)
(2000–present)

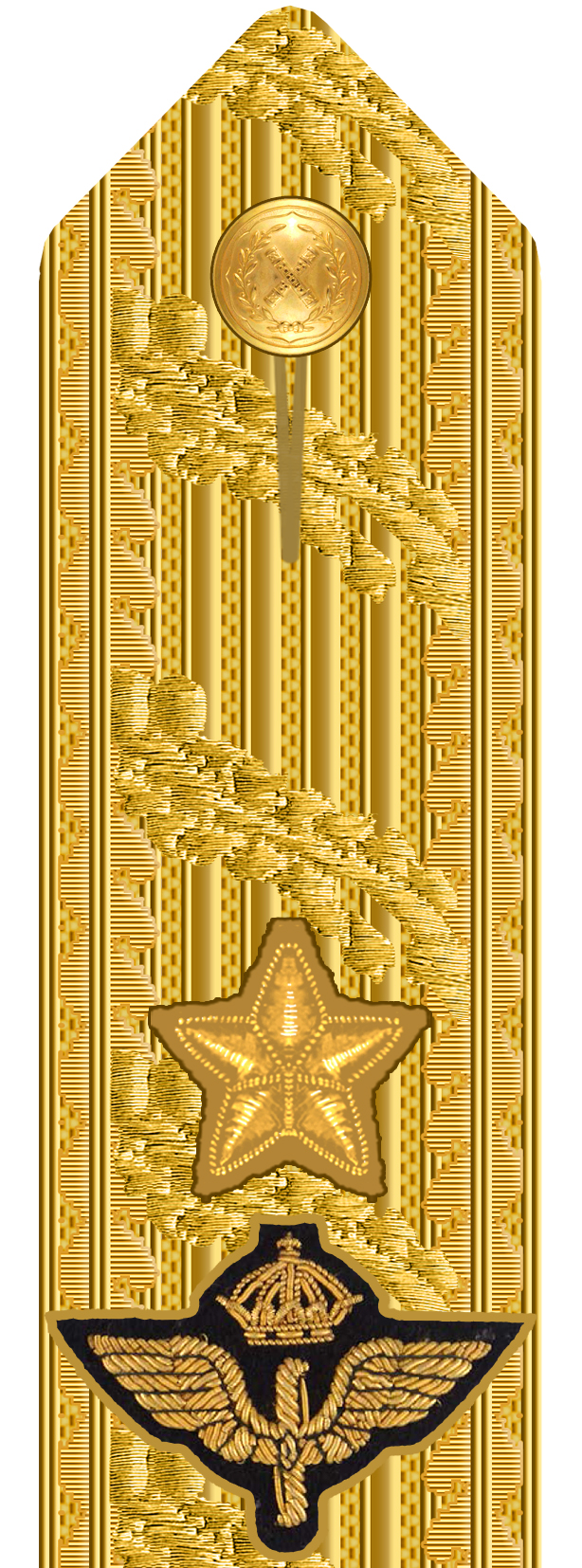
Shoulder mark (Air Force)
(2000–present)

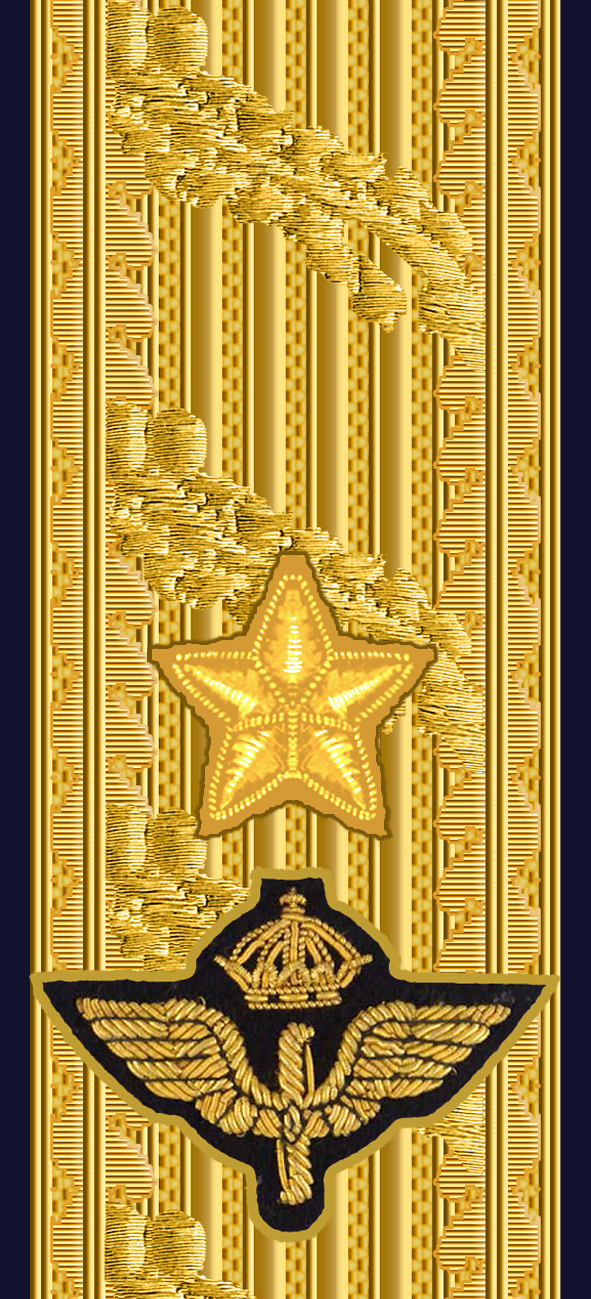
Shoulder mark (Air Force) (Note: A brigadier general wears on casings a 45 mm gallon m/51 and rank insignia in the form of 1 mm star m/30 in gold embroidery and 45 mm air badge m/51. The distance from the lower edge of the casing to the air badge m/51 must be 8 mm. The distance from the top of the air badge to the downward angles of the first star should be 5 mm.)
(2000–present)

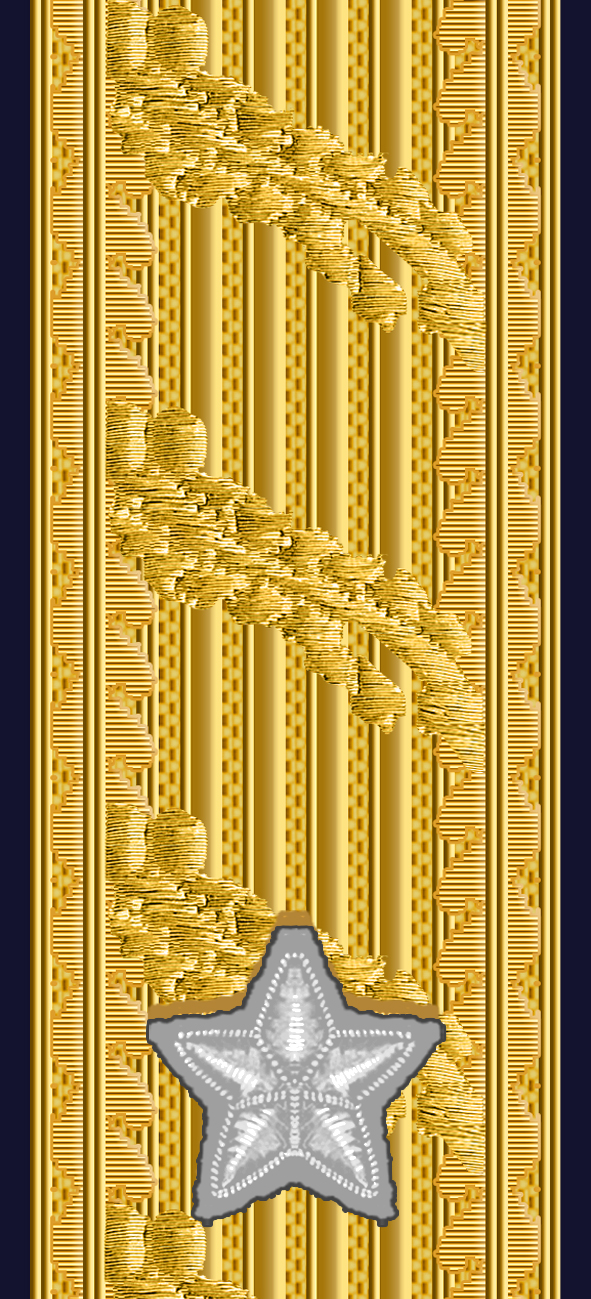
Shoulder mark (Navy) (Note: A brigadier general wear on casings a 45 mm gallon m/51 and one 25 mm star m/30 in silver embroidery on a white background. The rank insignia on casing (02B) is worn on all garments with shoulder straps.)
(2000–present)

=== Sleeve insignias ===
==== Amphibious Corps ====
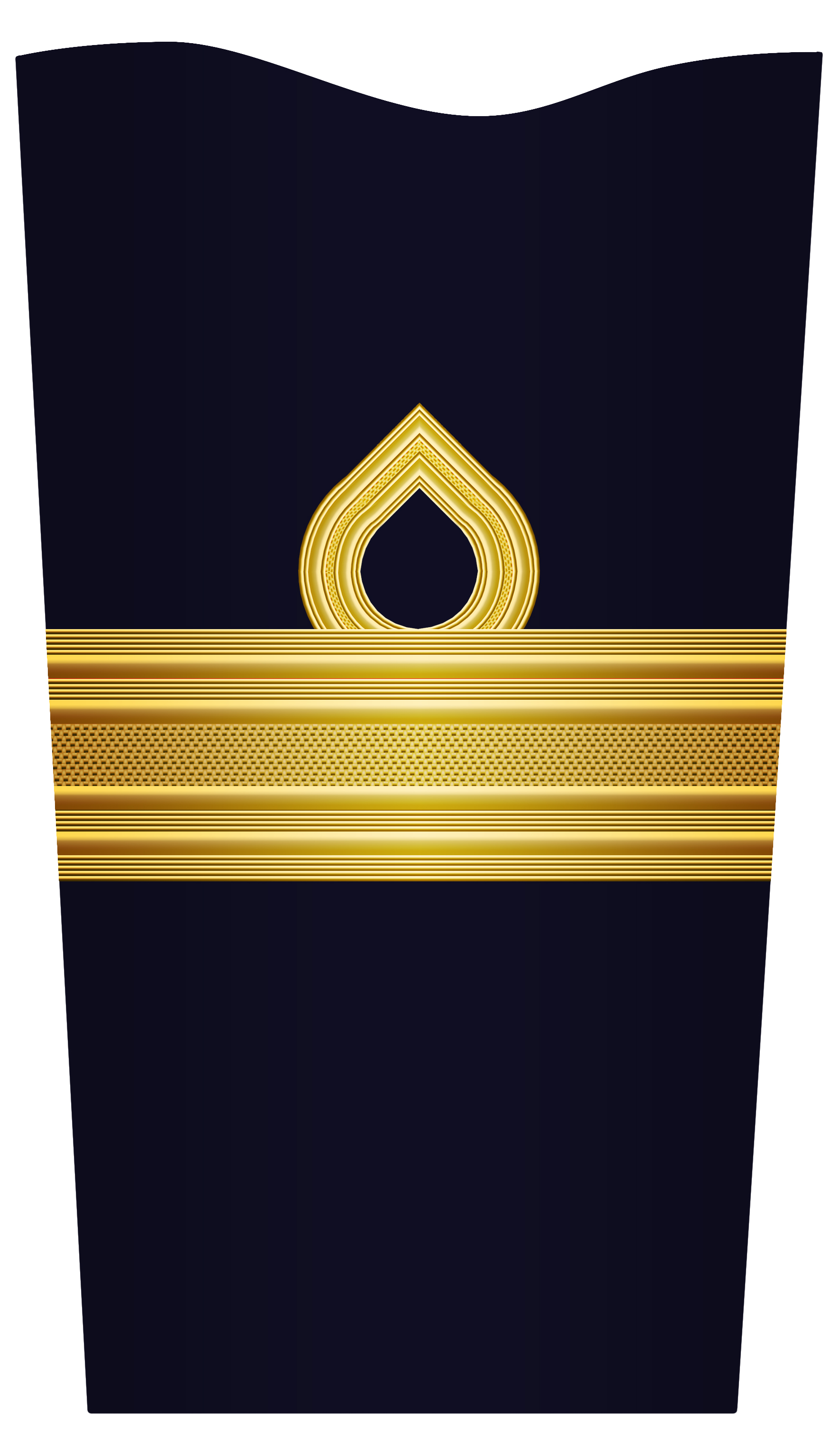
Sleeve insignia for a brigadier general (Note: A brigadier general wears sleeve insignia in the form of a galloon M/51 45MM K and rank designation sleeve 02 (GRADBET 02 ÄRM AMF, pointed loop). The loop should be directly attached to the 45 mm gallon.)
(2003–present)

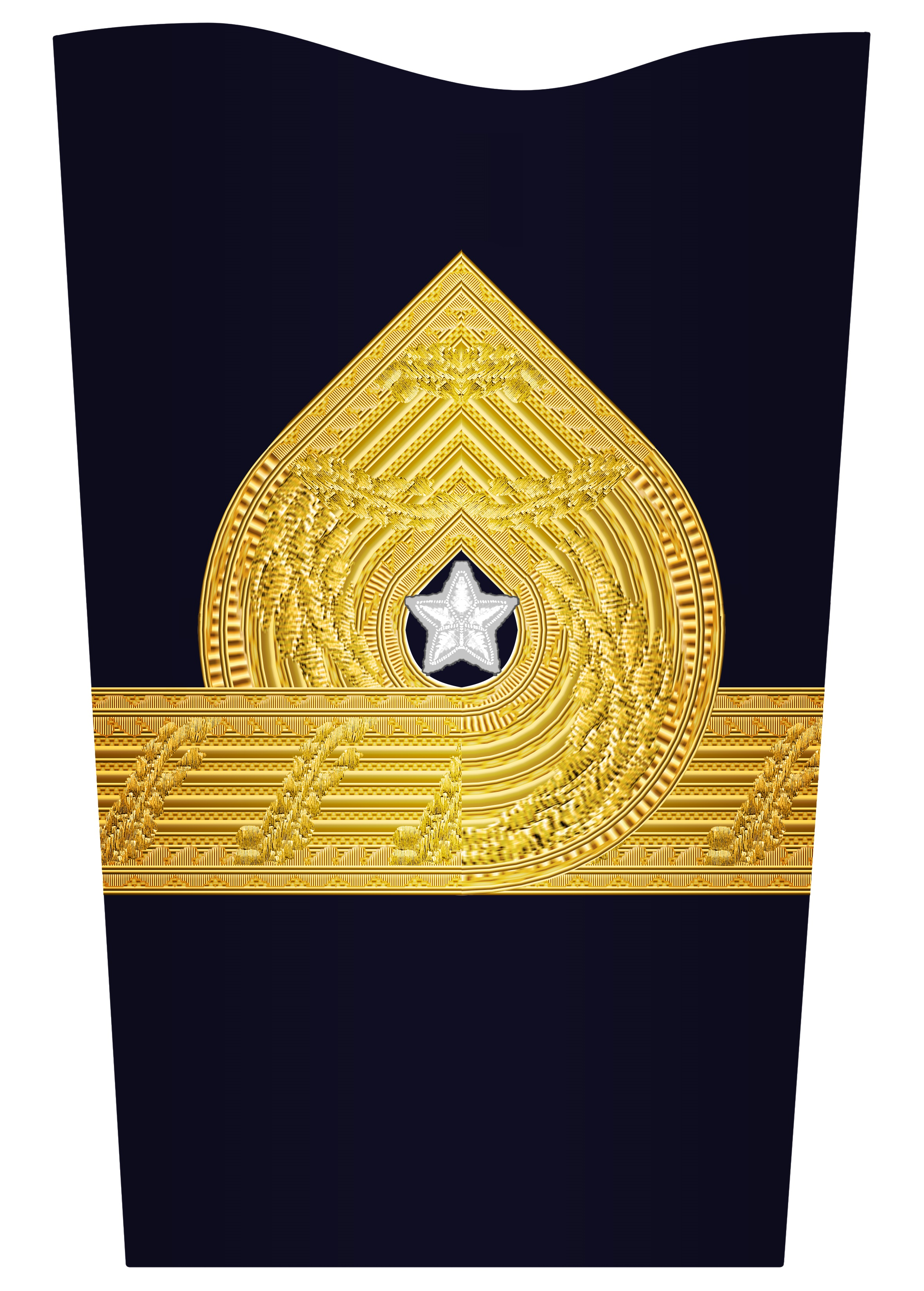
Sleeve insignia for a brigadier general
(2000–2003)

==== Air Force ====
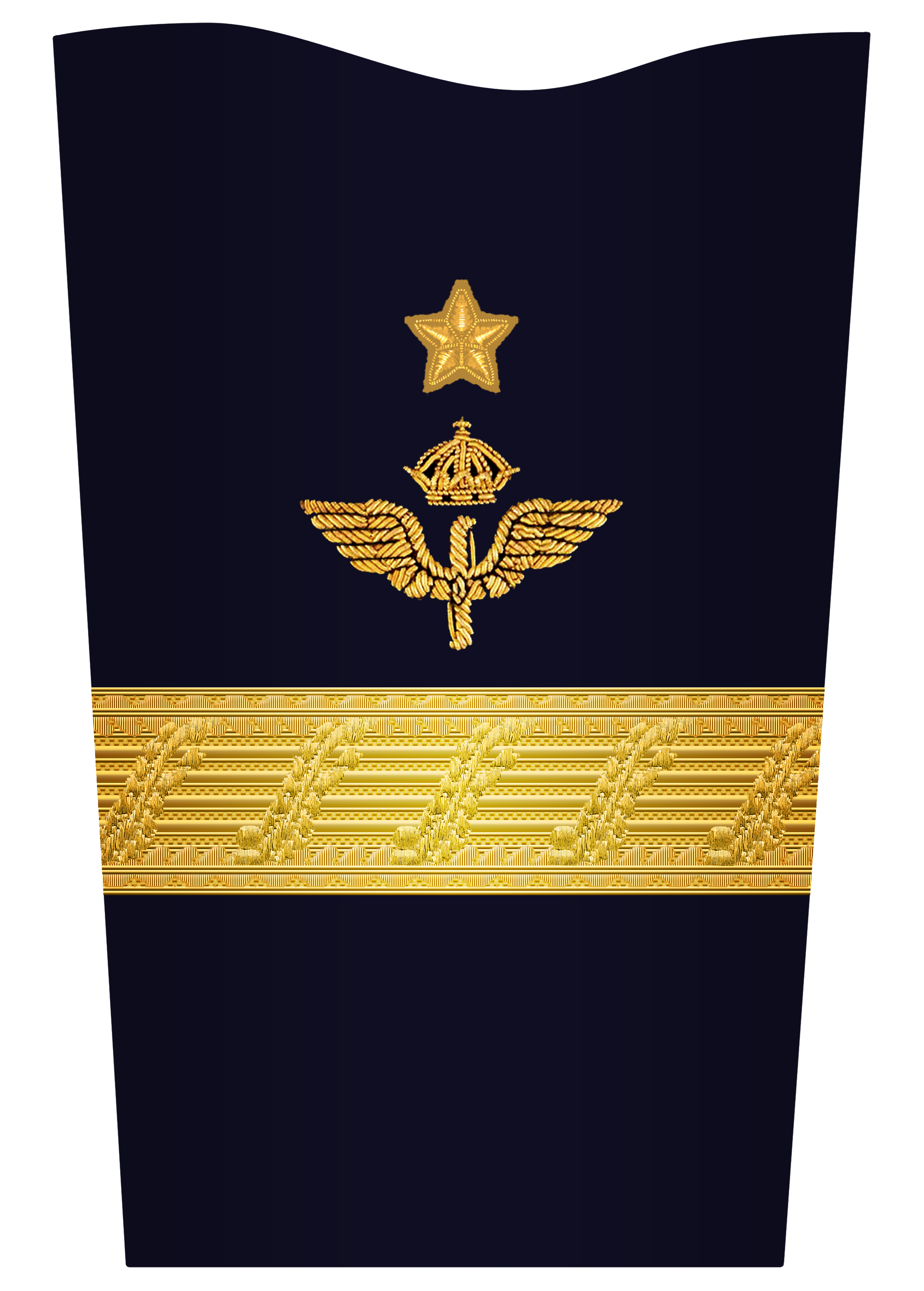
Mess jacket sleeve insignia for a brigadier general (Note: A brigadier general wears sleeve insignia in the form of a 25 mm star m/30 in gold embroidery around 70 mm air badge m/51 in gold embroidery over 45 mm galloon m/51 on mess jacket m/38. The distance from the lower edge of the sleeve to the lower edge of the gallon must be 80 mm. A brigadier general places 1 star 5 mm above the middle tip of the air badge.)

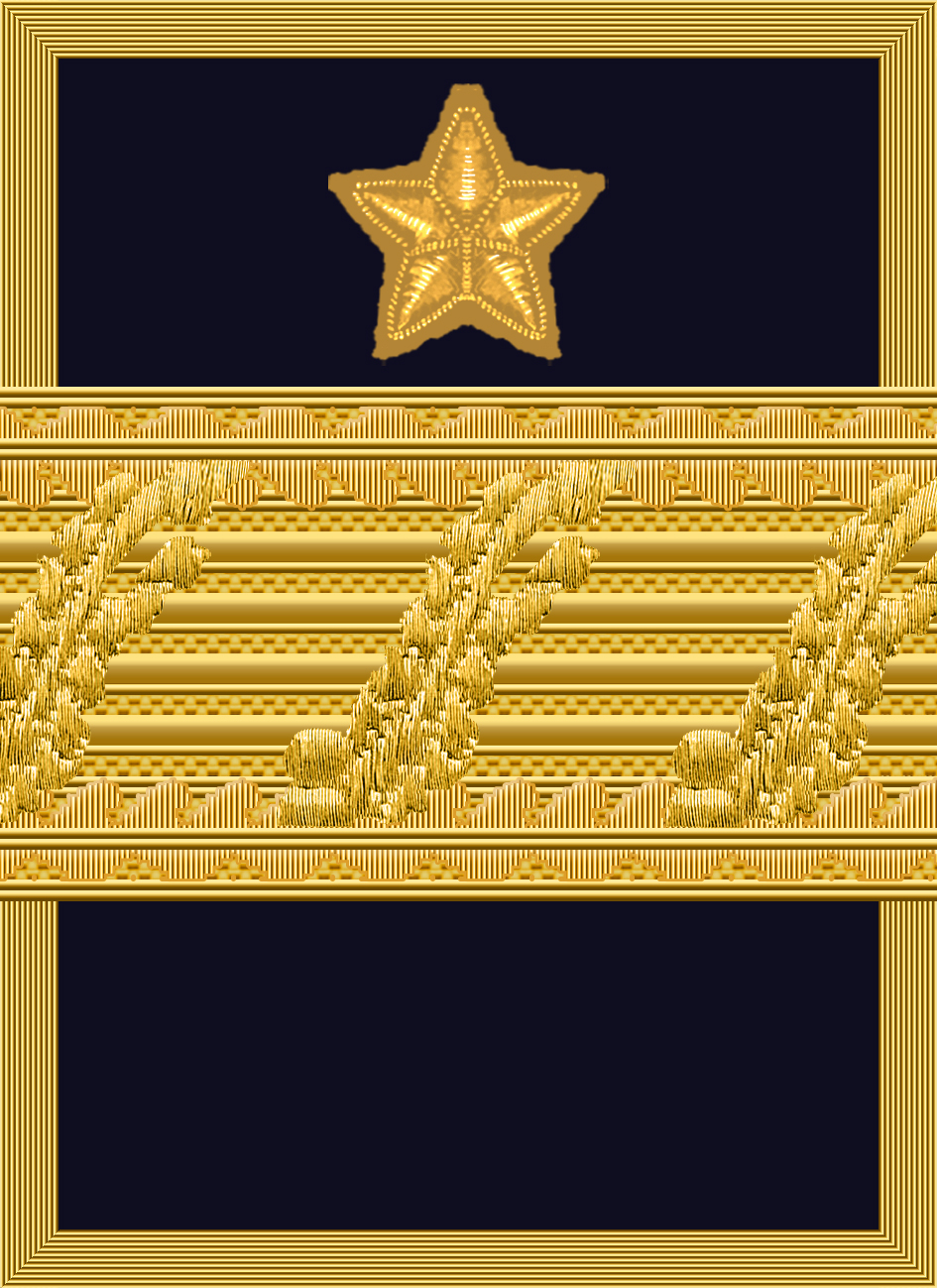
Flight suit sleeve insignia for a brigadier general (Note: A brigadier general wears this sleeve insignia on a flight suit. A brigadier general wears sleeve insignia (ärmmatta) m/02 composed of 5 mm gallon in gold, 1 star for brigadier general and 45 mm gallon. The sleeve insignia is attached with velcro to the left sleeve (seen from the wearer).)
(2000–present)

=== Hat insignia ===
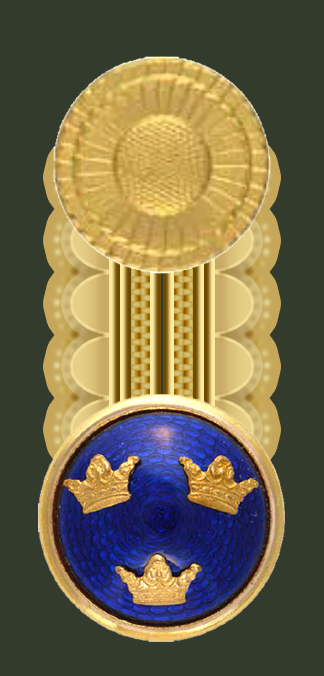
Clasp (agrafe) for a general of any rank (Note: Hat badge for a general of any rank for winter hat m/87. Cockade m/1865-1960 and button m/1865 for general officer, two parallel 10 mm hat gallons m/60 in gold embroidery with 2 mm intervals.)
(?–2002)

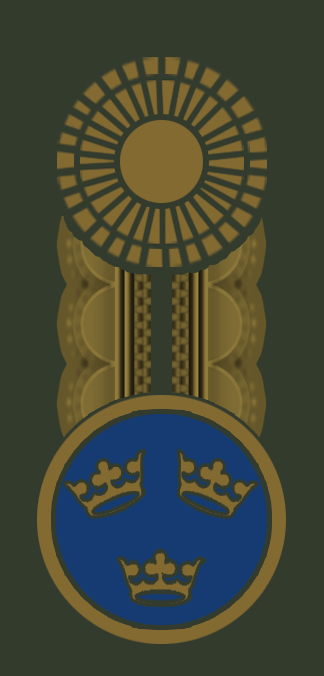
Clasp (agrafe) for a general of any rank (Note: Clasp (agrafe) of textile is worn on field cap m/90, field hat m/90 beige and fur hat m/59. On the field hat, the clasp is attached centered in the front direction at the bottom (approx. 3-5 mm above) of the visors mount. On the fur hat m/59, the clasp is attached centered in the front direction close to the edge of the band that separates the visor attachment to the hat hump.)
(c. 2002–2009)

== Personal flags ==
The command flag of a brigader general (and a rear admiral (lower half)) is a double swallowtailed Swedish flag. In the first blue field 1 five-pointed white star.

Brigadier general/rear admiral (lower half) flag (Note: This one-star flag was used for a rear admiral between 1905 and 1972.)
(2000–present)
