= Generalmajor (Sweden) =

Military rank in Sweden

Major General generalmajor
- Country: Sweden
- Service branch: Army; Air Force; Amphibious Corps (from 2000); Coastal Artillery (until 2000)
- Abbreviation: Genmj (Swedish), MajGen (English)
- Rank: Two-star (Note: Major general was a one-star rank until 1972 and lieutenant general was the two-star rank in the Swedish Armed Forces rank structure.)
- NATO rank code: OF-7
- Non-NATO rank: O-8
- Next higher rank: Lieutenant general
- Next lower rank: Brigadier general (2000–); Senior colonel (1972–2000); Colonel (–1972)
- Equivalent ranks: Rear admiral

Major General (MajGen) (Swedish: generalmajor, genmj) is a two-star commissioned officer rank in the Swedish Army, Swedish Air Force and Swedish Amphibious Corps. Major general ranks immediately above brigadier general and below a lieutenant general. The rank is equivalent to rear admiral in the Swedish Navy.

== History ==
Historically, the major general assumed approximately the same position as a Chief of General Staff did in the latter part of the 19th century and the beginning of the 20th century. The major general was usually the commander of a brigade.

The rank of major general was between the rank of colonel and lieutenant general until 1972 when the senior colonel rank was introduced. Thereafter, major general was between the senior colonel and the lieutenant general from 1972 to 2000 when the brigadier general rank was introduced. Since 2000, major general has been between brigadier general and lieutenant general.

Following a proposal from the Swedish Armed Forces, the Government of Sweden decides on employment as a general of any rank.

In everyday speech, generals of all ranks are addressed as generals.

== Rank insignia ==
=== Collar patches ===
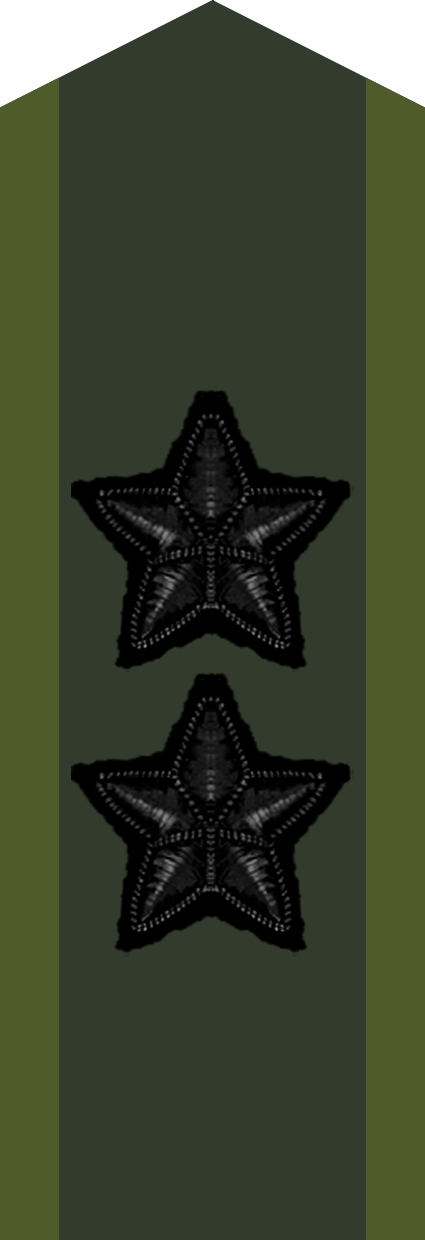
Collar patch m/58 (black m/02) on field uniform M90
(2002–present)

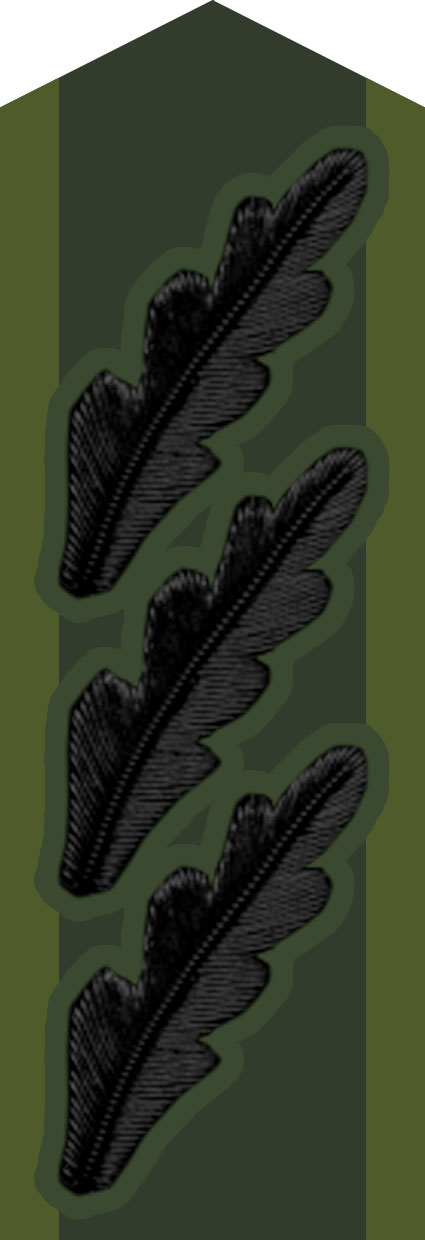
Collar patch m/58 (black m/02) on field uniform M90
(2002–present)

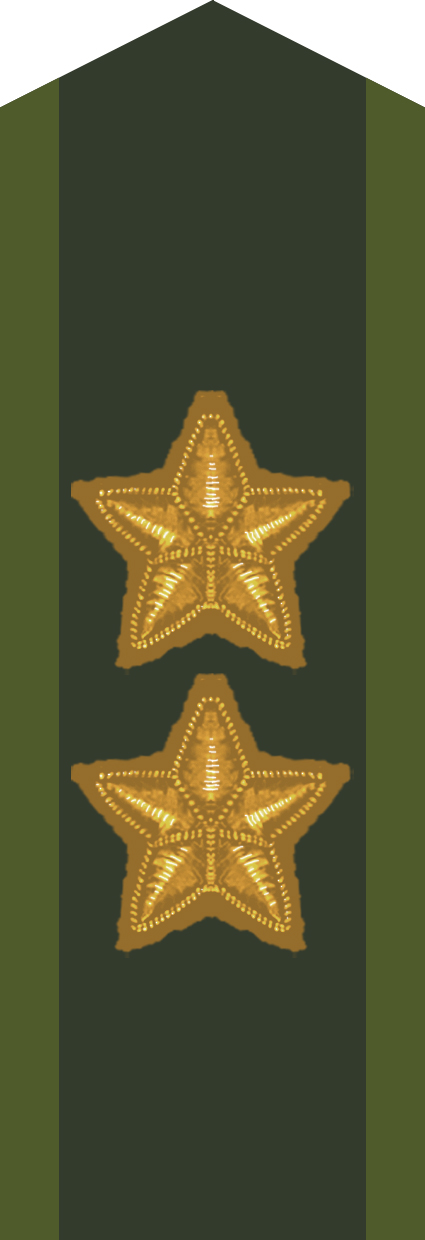
Collar patch m/58 (gold) on uniform m/58-m/59 and field uniform M90
(1983–2002)

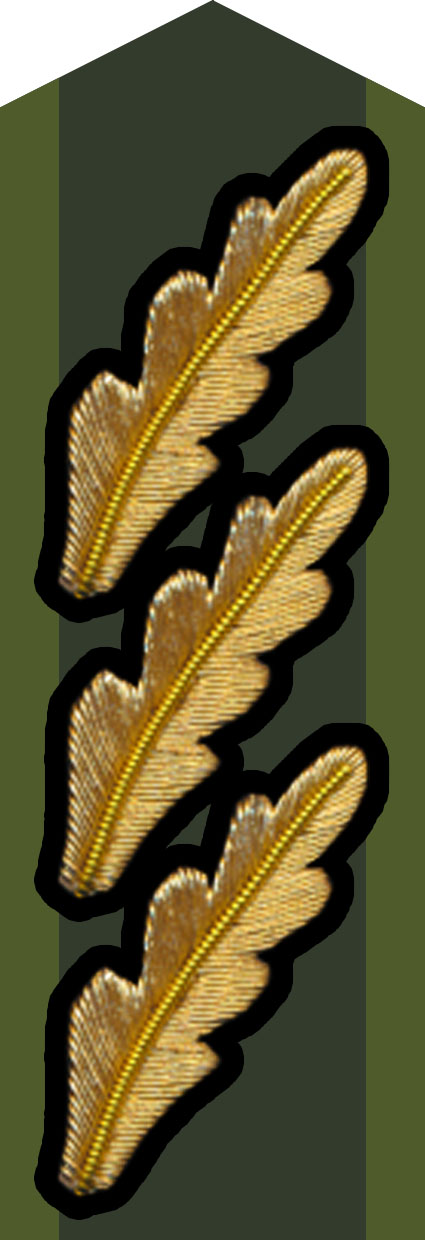
Collar patch m/58 (gold) on uniform m/58-m/59 and field uniform M90
(–2002)

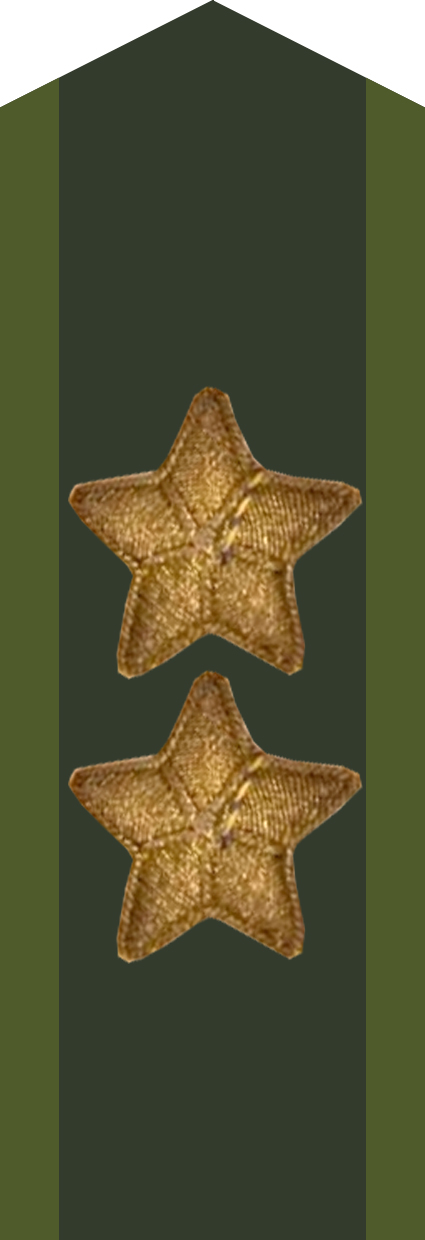
Collar patch m/58 (bronze) on uniform m/58-m/59
(1972–1983)

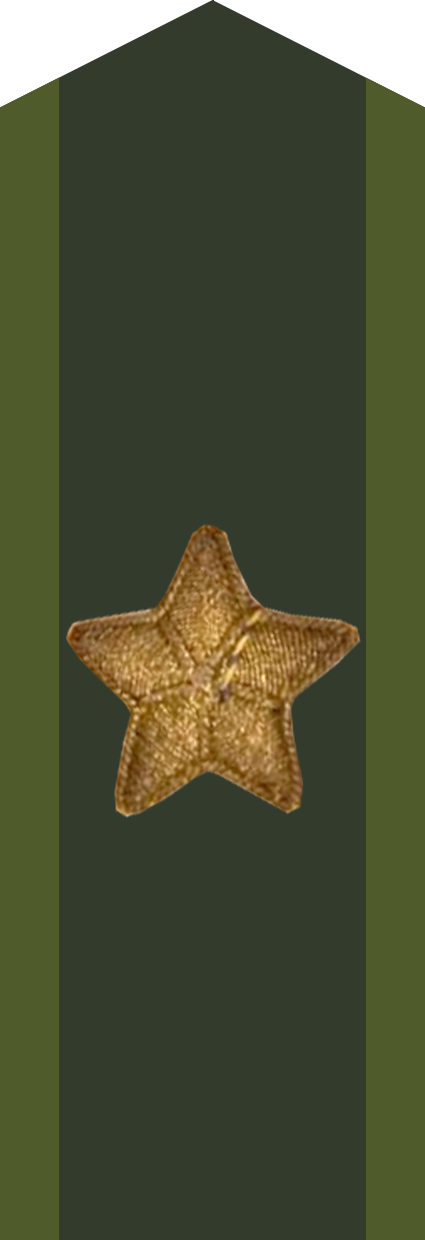
Collar patch m/58 (bronze) on uniform m/58-m/59
(1958–1972)

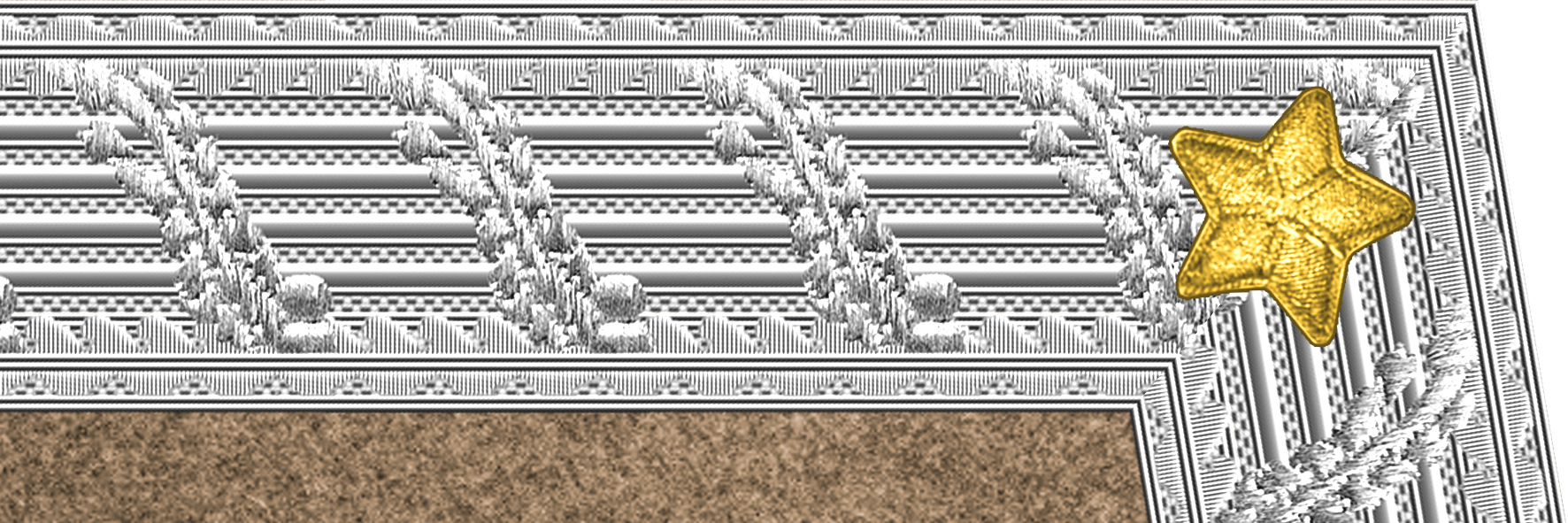
Collar patch on uniform m/1923
(1923–1939)

=== Shoulder marks ===
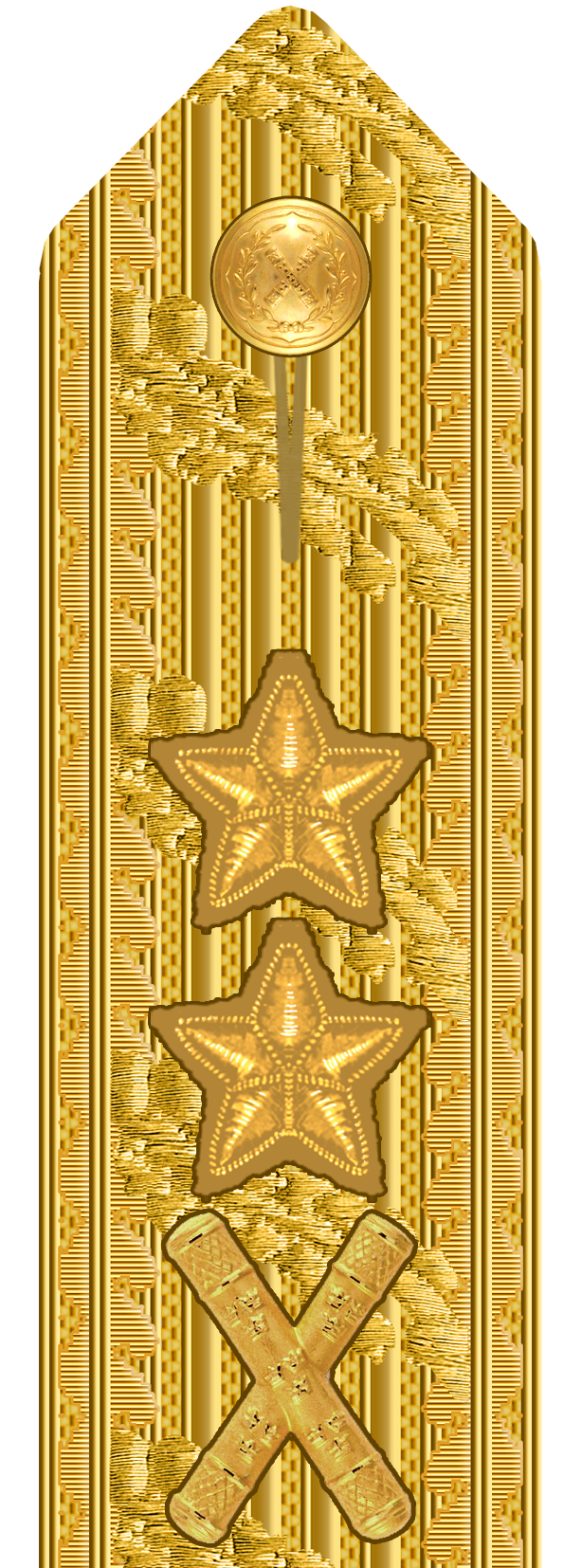
Shoulder mark on uniform m/87 (Army)
(1987–present)

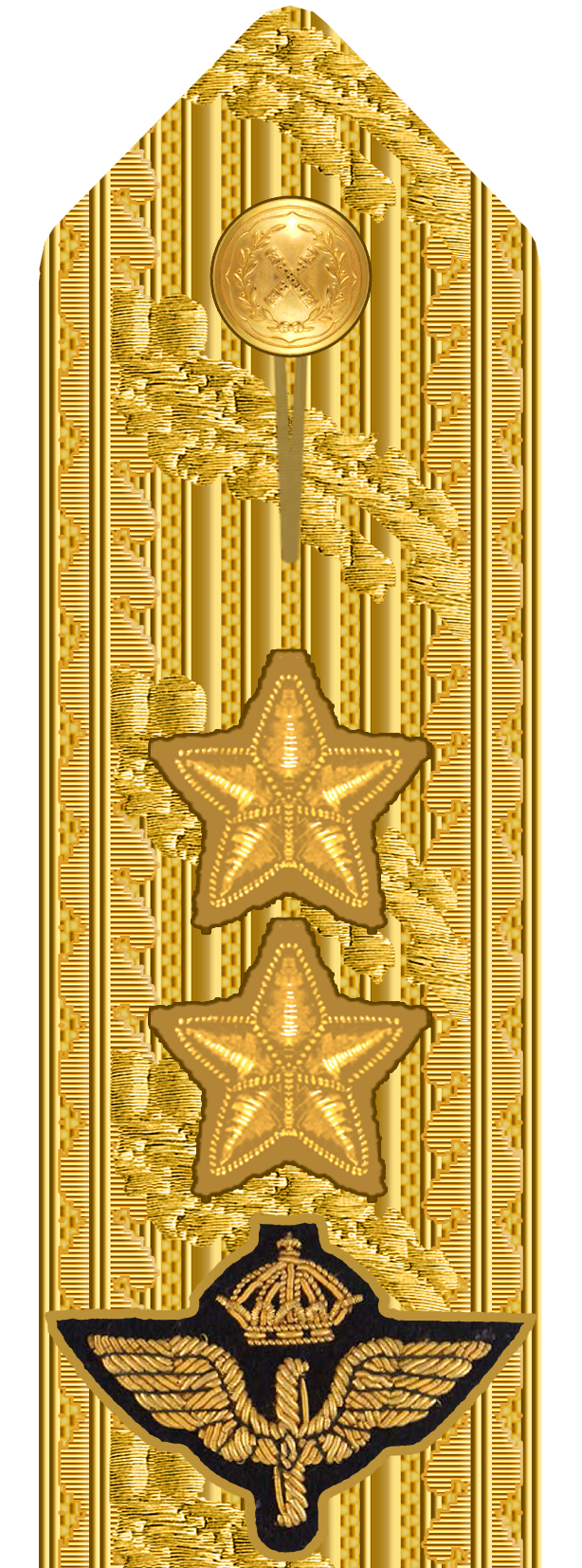
Shoulder mark on uniform m/87 (Air Force)
(1987–present)

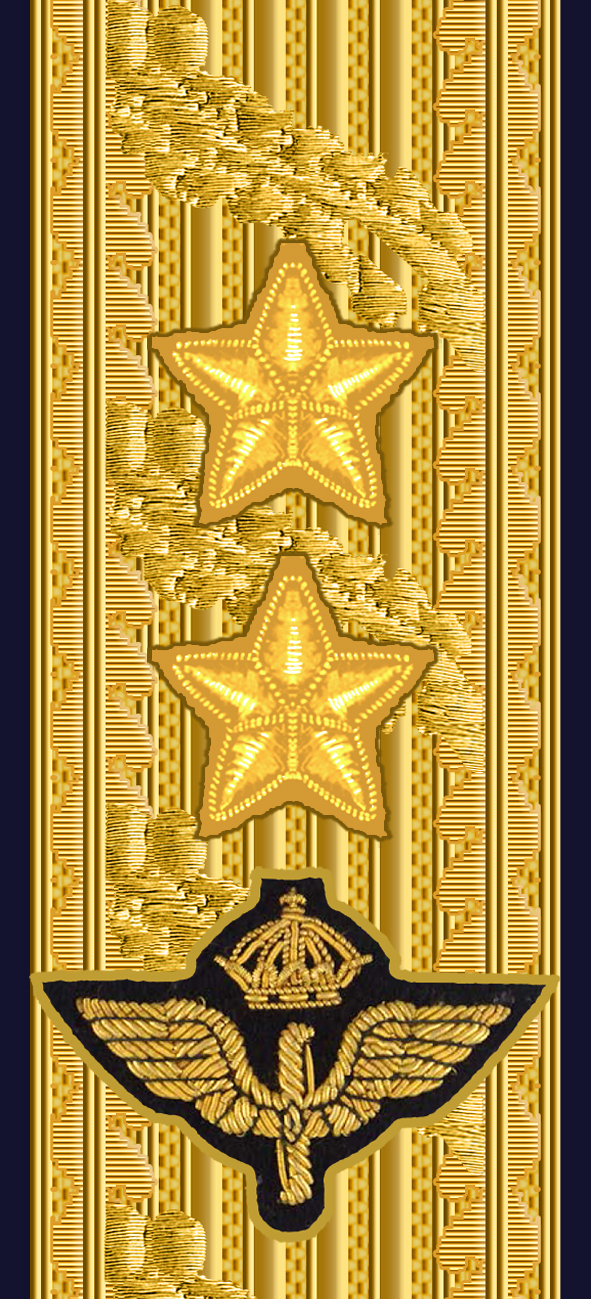
Shoulder mark m/87 on white shirt (Air Force)
(1987–present)

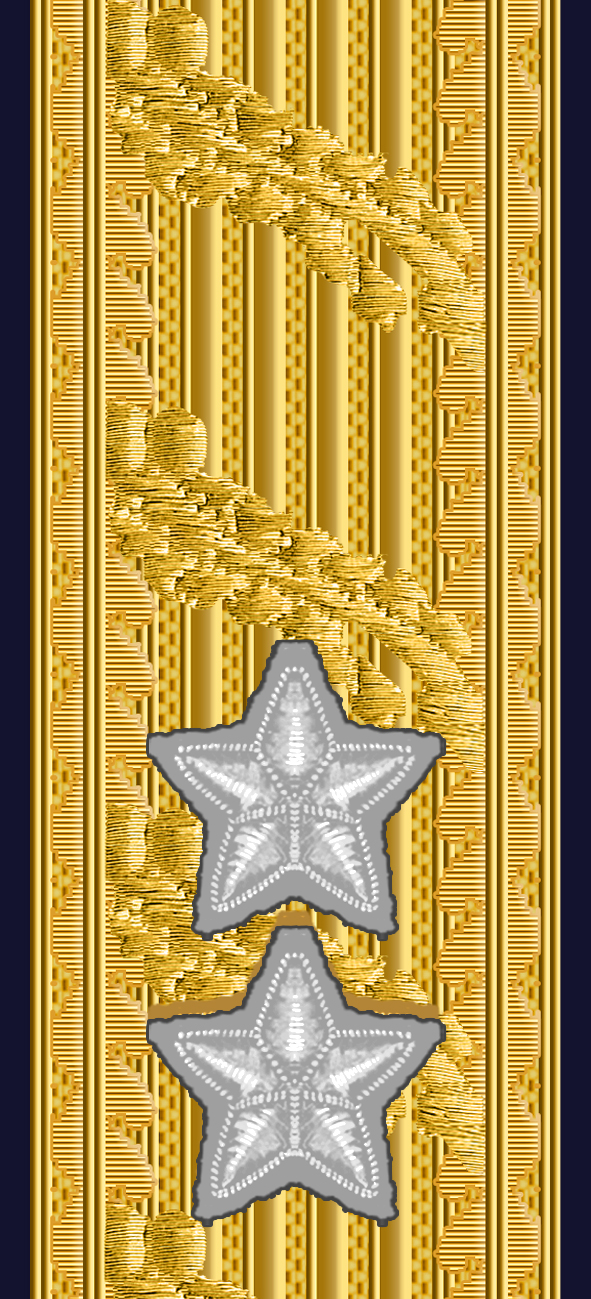
Shoulder mark m/87 on uniform m/87 - white and white shirt (Navy)
(1987–present)

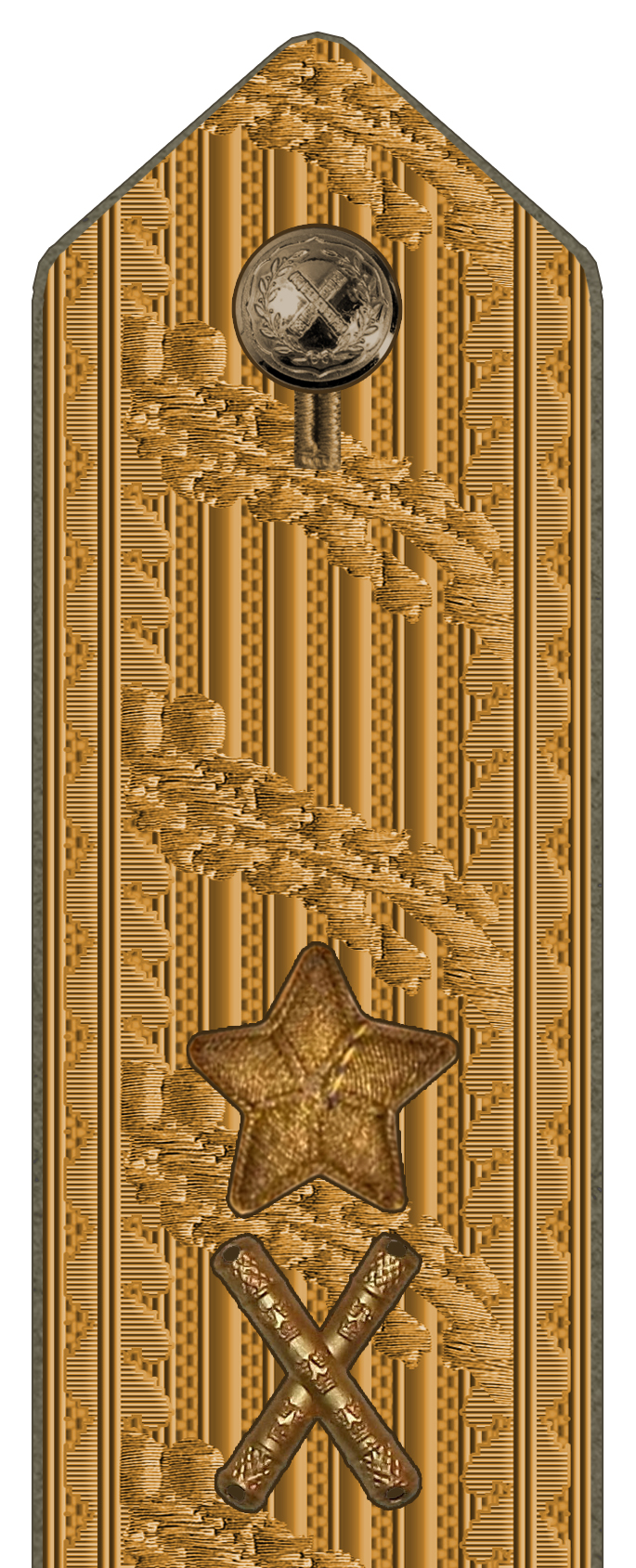
Shoulder mark on uniform m/1939
(1939–1958)

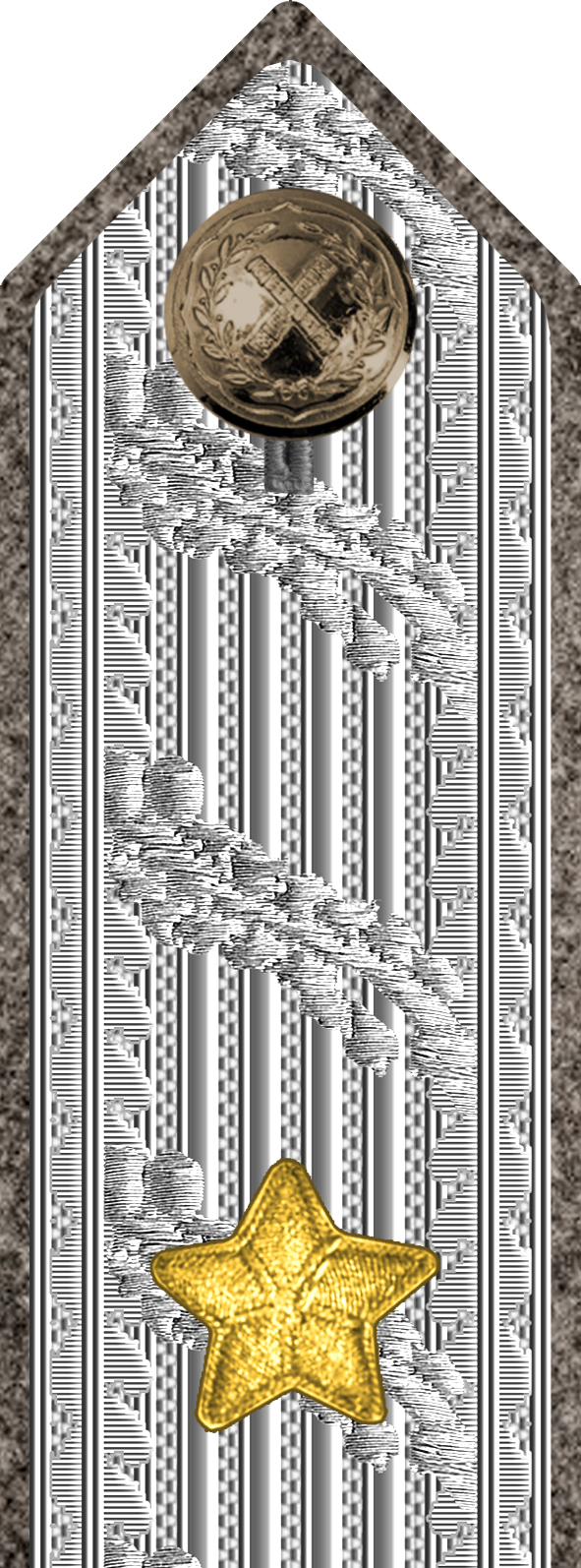
Shoulder mark on uniform m/1923
(1923–1939)

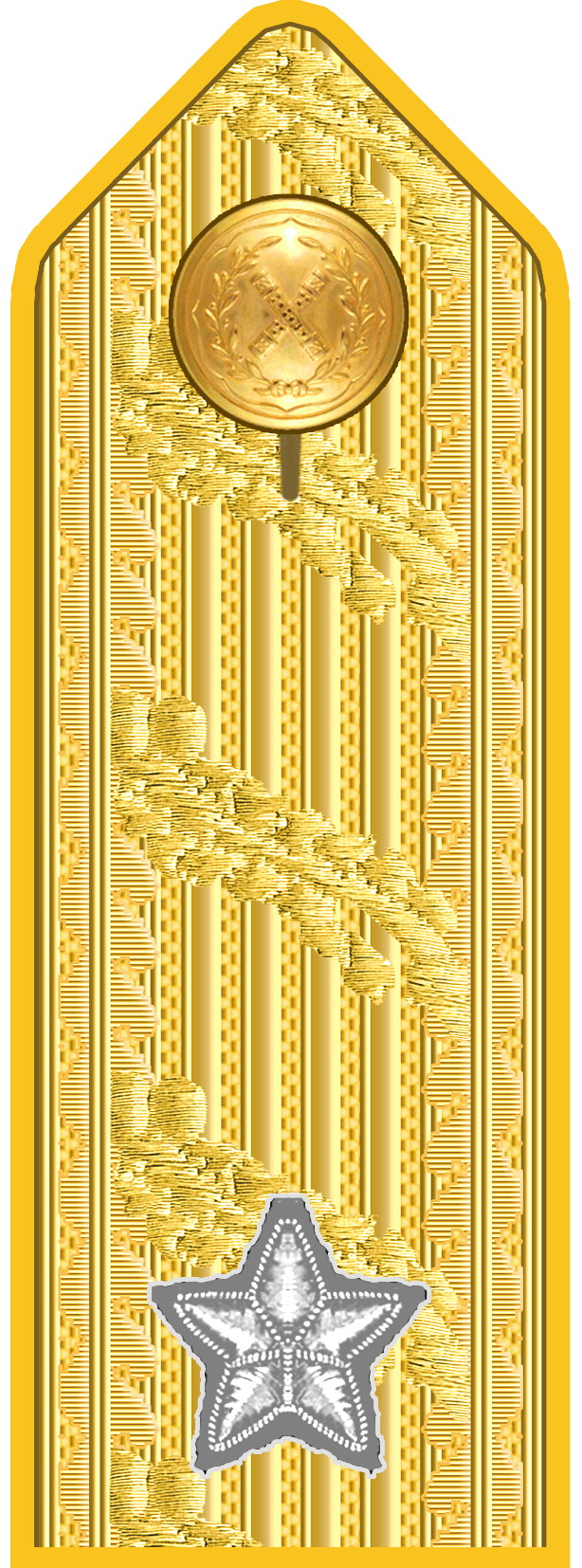
Shoulder mark on uniform m/1910
(1910–1923)

=== Sleeve insignias ===
==== Amphibious Corps and Coastal Artillery ====
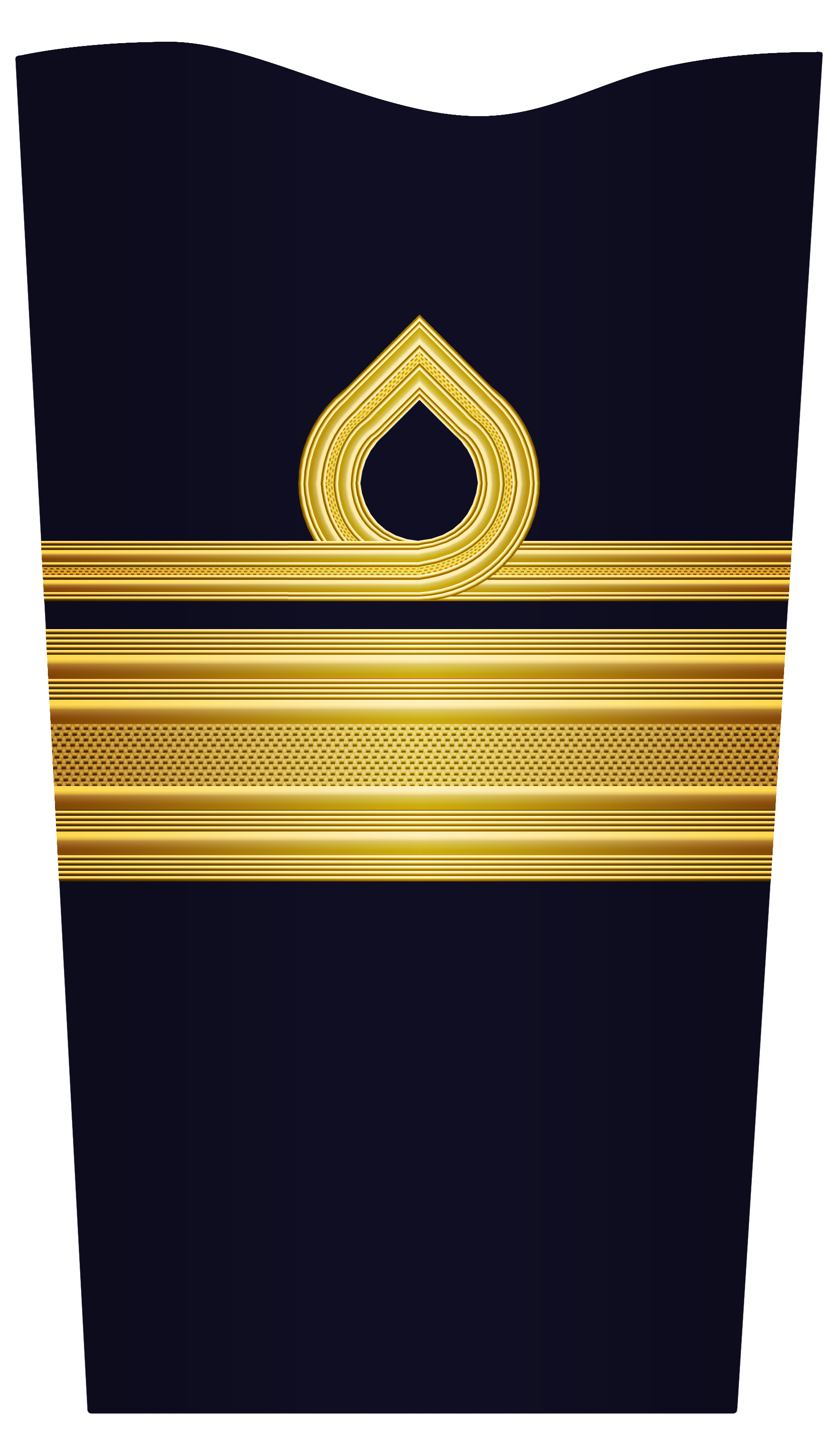
Sleeve insignia for a major general in the Amphibious Corps
(2003–present)

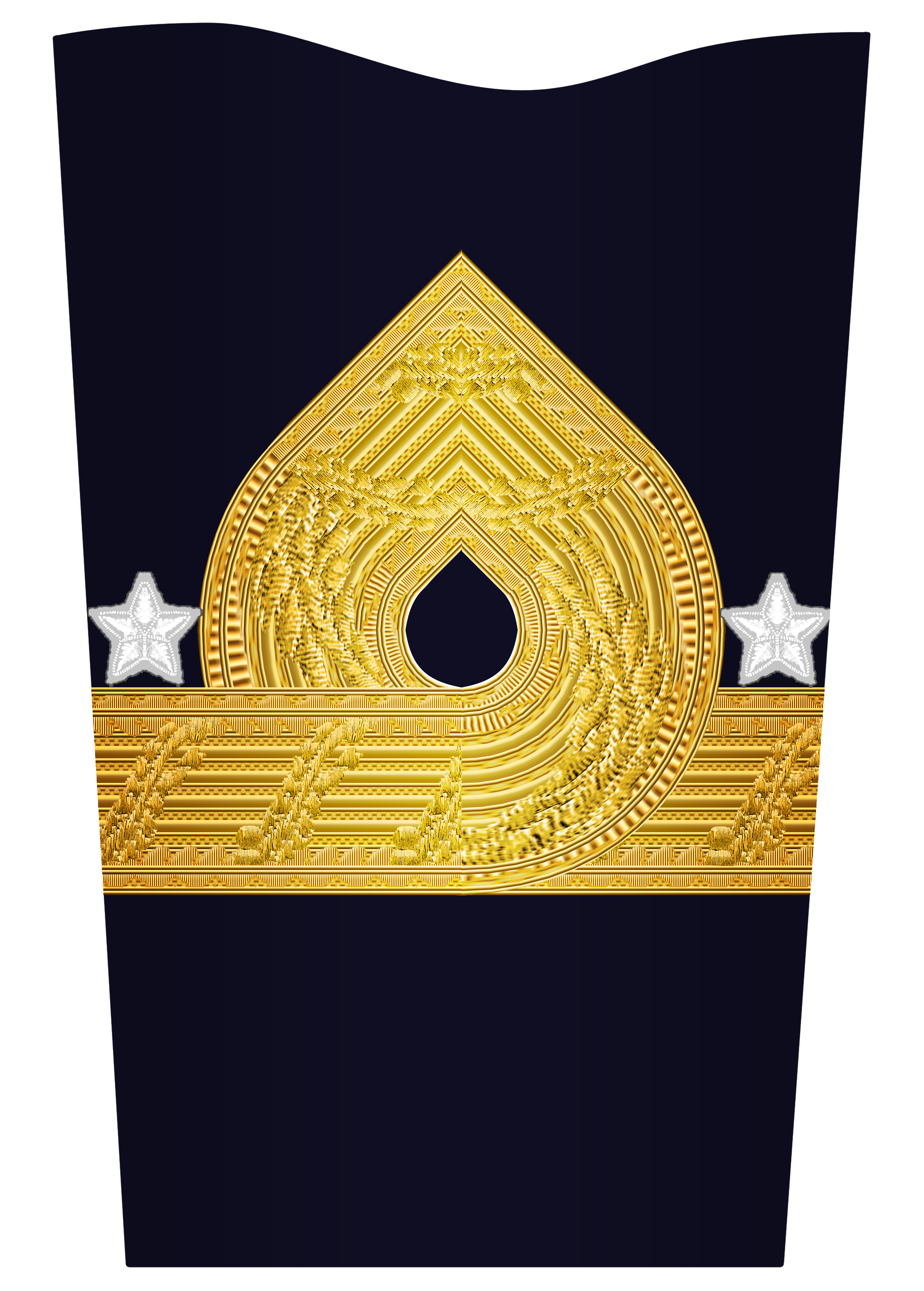
Sleeve insignia for a major general in the Amphibious Corps
(2000–2003)
and
Coastal Artillery
(1972–2000)

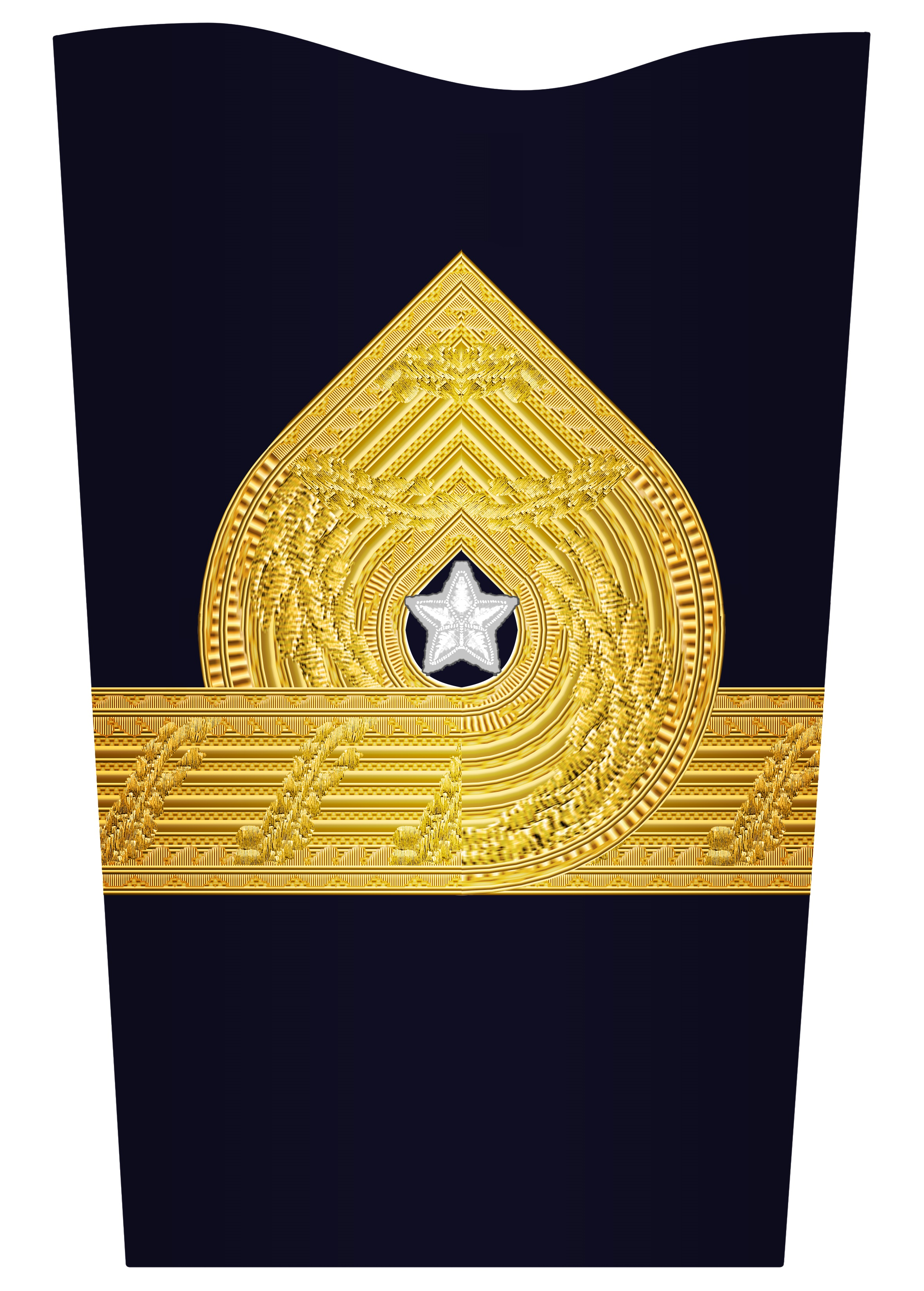
Sleeve insignia for a major general in the Coastal Artillery (1901–1972)

==== Air Force ====
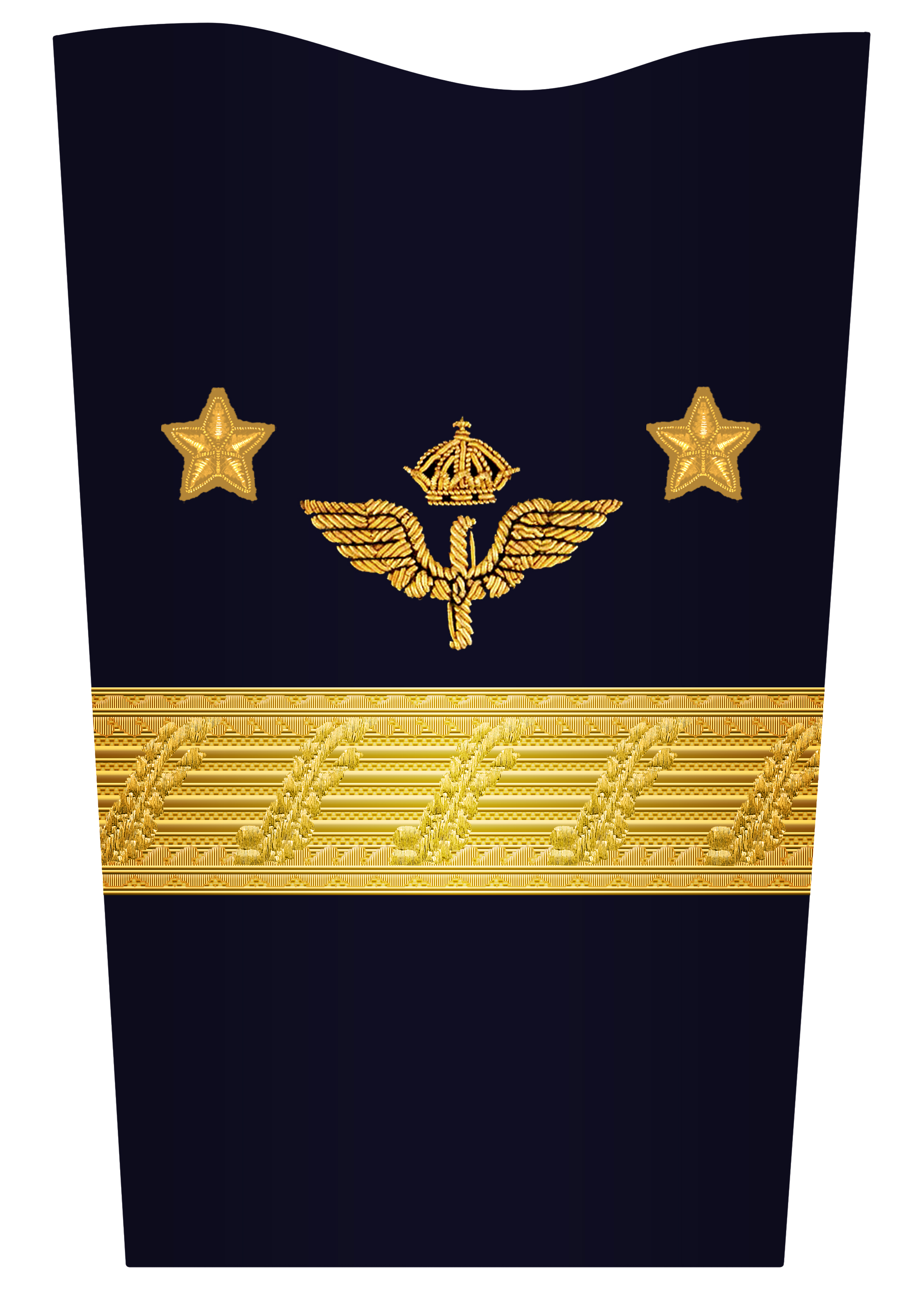
Sleeve insignia for a major general (1972–?) (today only on mess dress uniform)

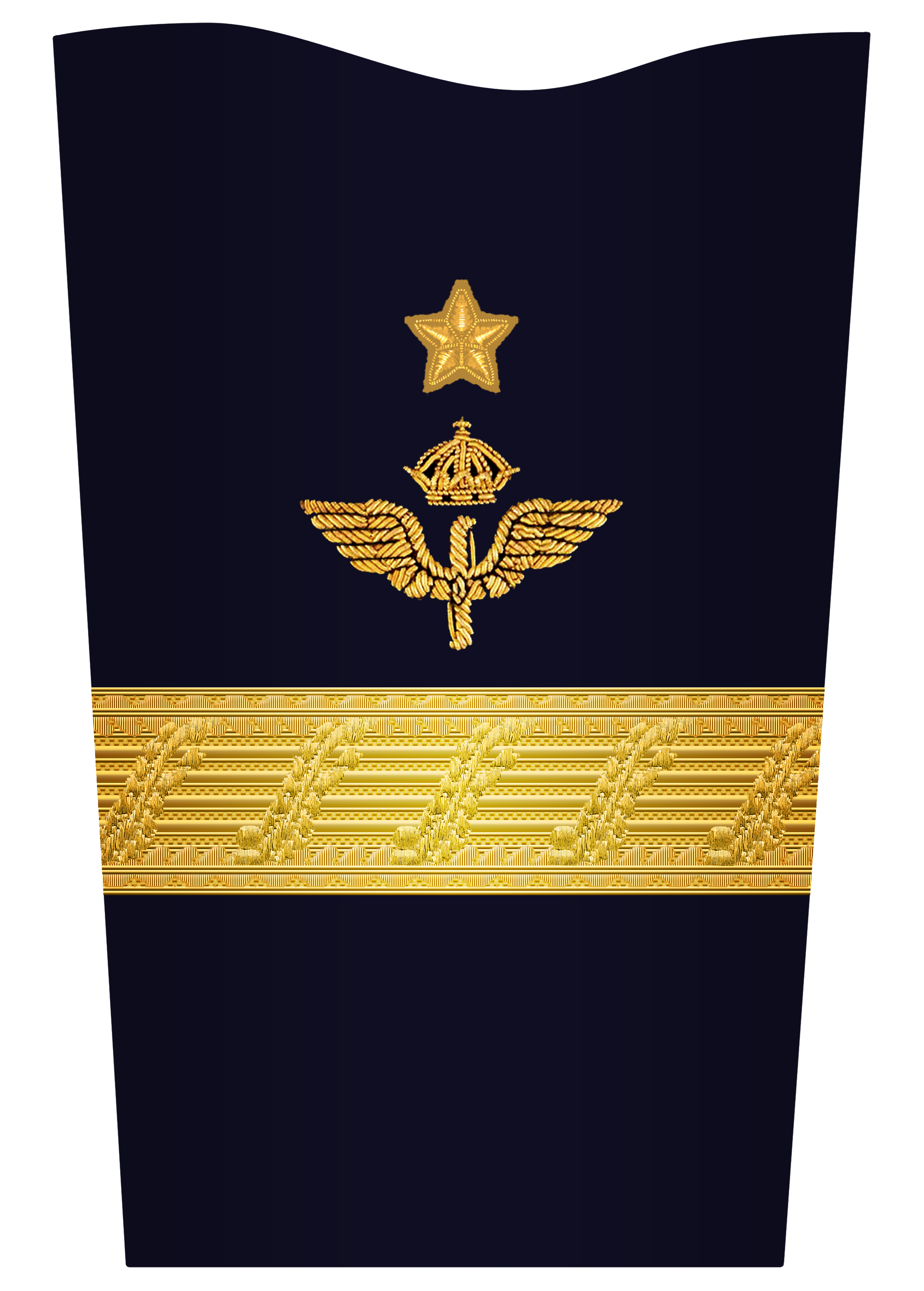
Sleeve insignia for a major general (?–1972)

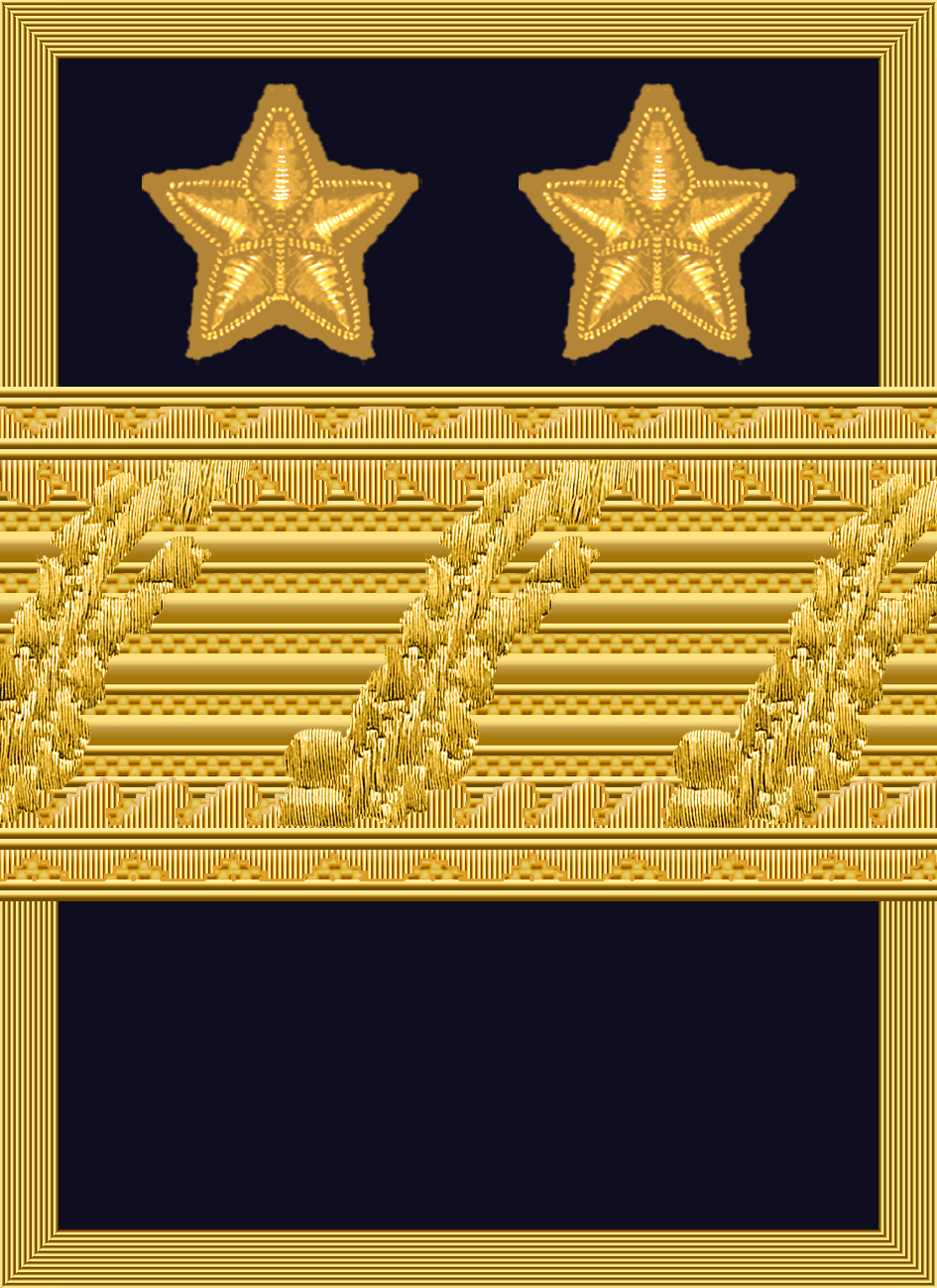
Flight suit sleeve insignia (Ärmmatta m/02) for a major general
(1972–present)

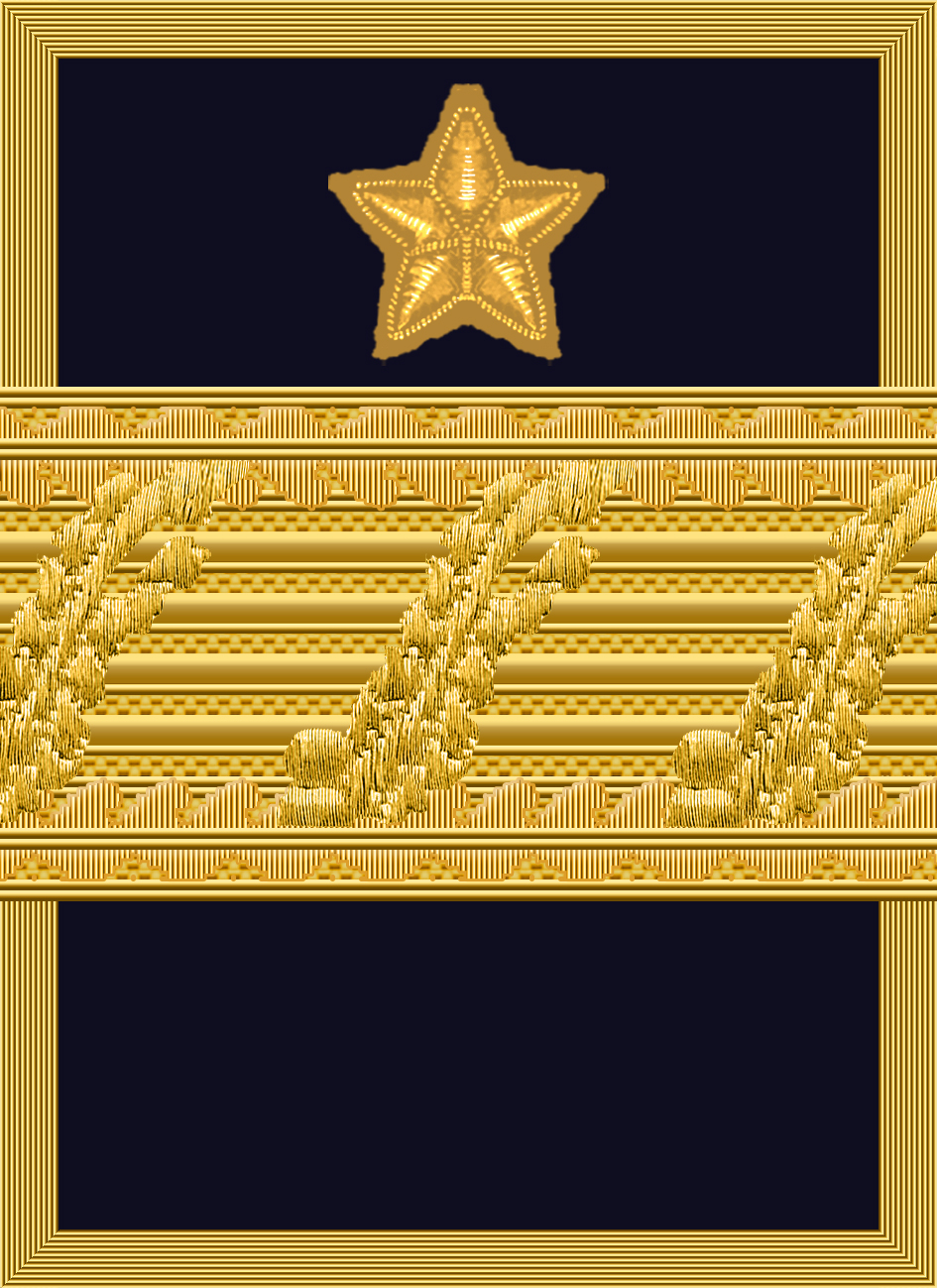
Flight suit sleeve insignia for a major general
(?–1972)

==== Army ====
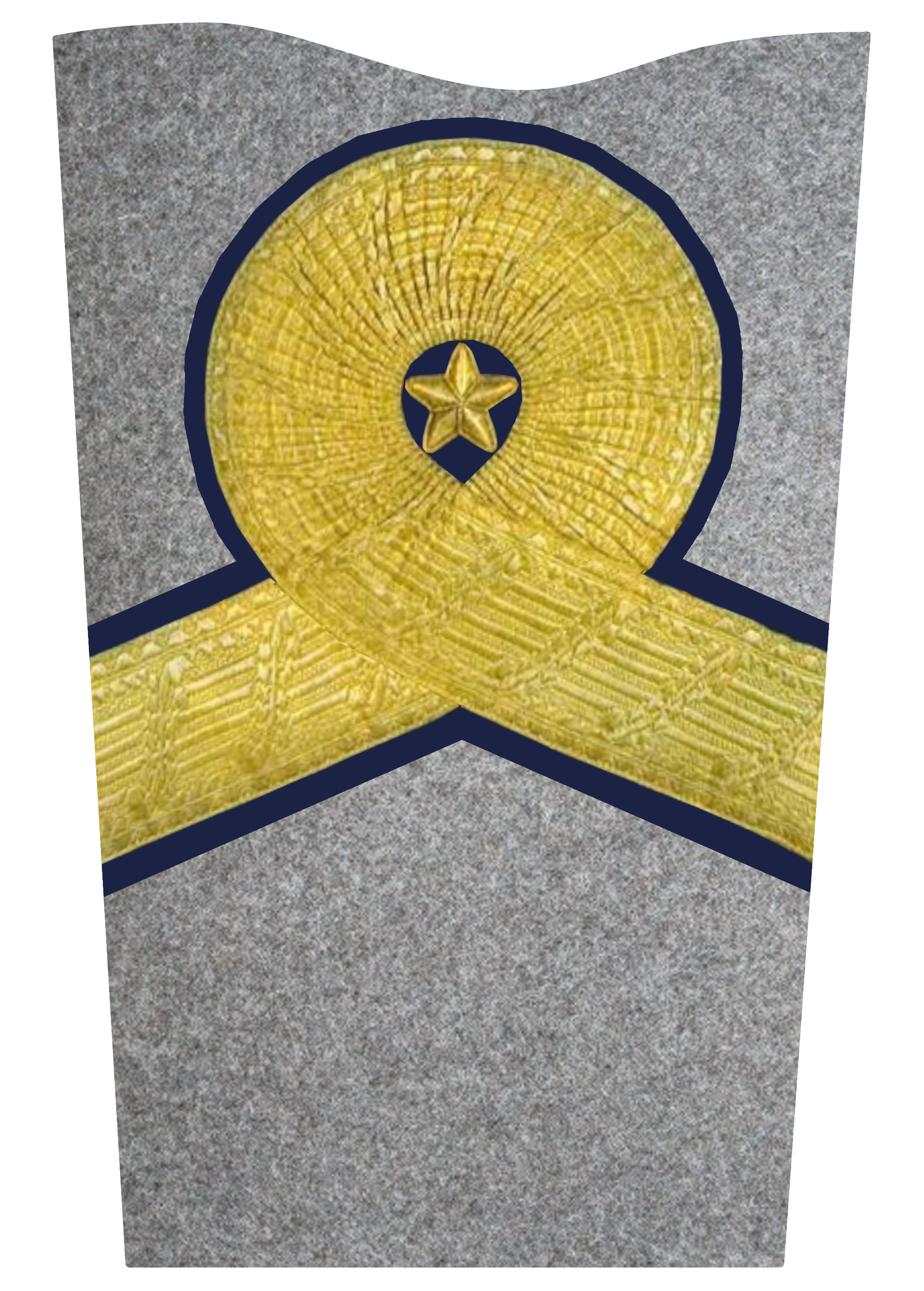
Sleeve insignia for a major general on uniform m/1906
(1906–1923)

=== Hats ===
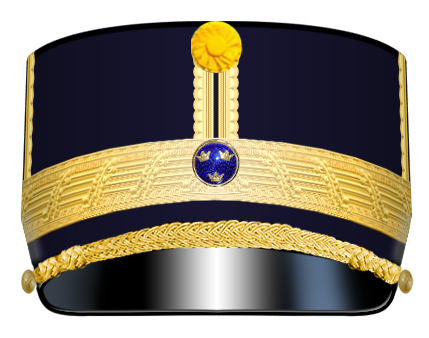
Hat for general of any rank on uniform m/1865-99
(1865–?)

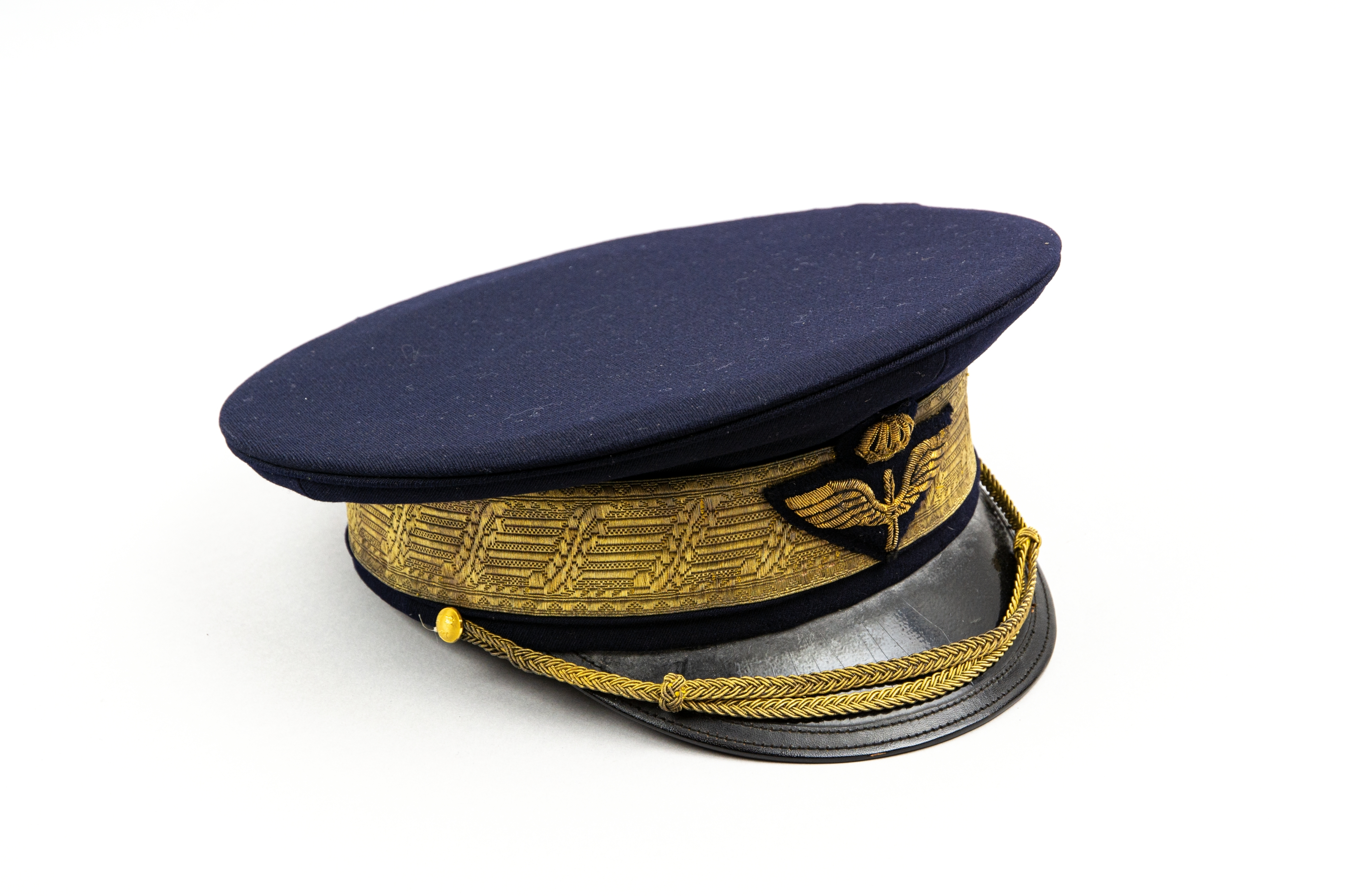
Peaked cap (dark blue) for air force major general (Skärmmössa m/1930)
(1930–)

== Personal flags ==
The command flag of a major general (and a rear admiral) is a double swallowtailed Swedish flag. In the first blue field 2 five-pointed white stars beside each other.

Major general/Rear admiral command flag (2 stars) (Note: This two-star flag was used for a vice admiral between 1905 and 1972.)
(1972–present)
