= NCU =

NCU may refer to:

== Businesses and organizations ==
- National Cleanup Day, a cleanup event held annually on the Third Saturday in September
- National Cyclists' Union, a former association for bicycle racing in Great Britain
- Northern Cricket Union of Ireland

== Education ==
- Nagoya City University, Japan
- Nanchang University in Jiangxi, China
- former name of Nanjing University in Nanjing, China
- National Central University in Jhongli, Taiwan
- Nicolaus Copernicus University in Toruń, Poland
- The NorthCap University, in Gurgaon, Haryana, India
- University of North Carolina at Chapel Hill, sometimes referred to as North Carolina University
- North Central University in Minneapolis, Minnesota
- Northcentral University in Prescott, Arizona
- Northwest Christian University in Eugene, Oregon
- Northern Caribbean University in Mandeville, Jamaica

== Other ==
- National Currency Unit used in OECD statistics
- Nordic Combat Uniform
- Nukus Airport (Uzbekistan), IATA code
