= M90 (camouflage) =

Swedish camouflage pattern

The M90 camouflage pattern

The M90 camouflage is the camouflage pattern for the uniform system 90, used by the Swedish Armed Forces in the late 1980s, and was adopted by the entire force by the late 1990s.

== History ==
=== FOA camouflage ===
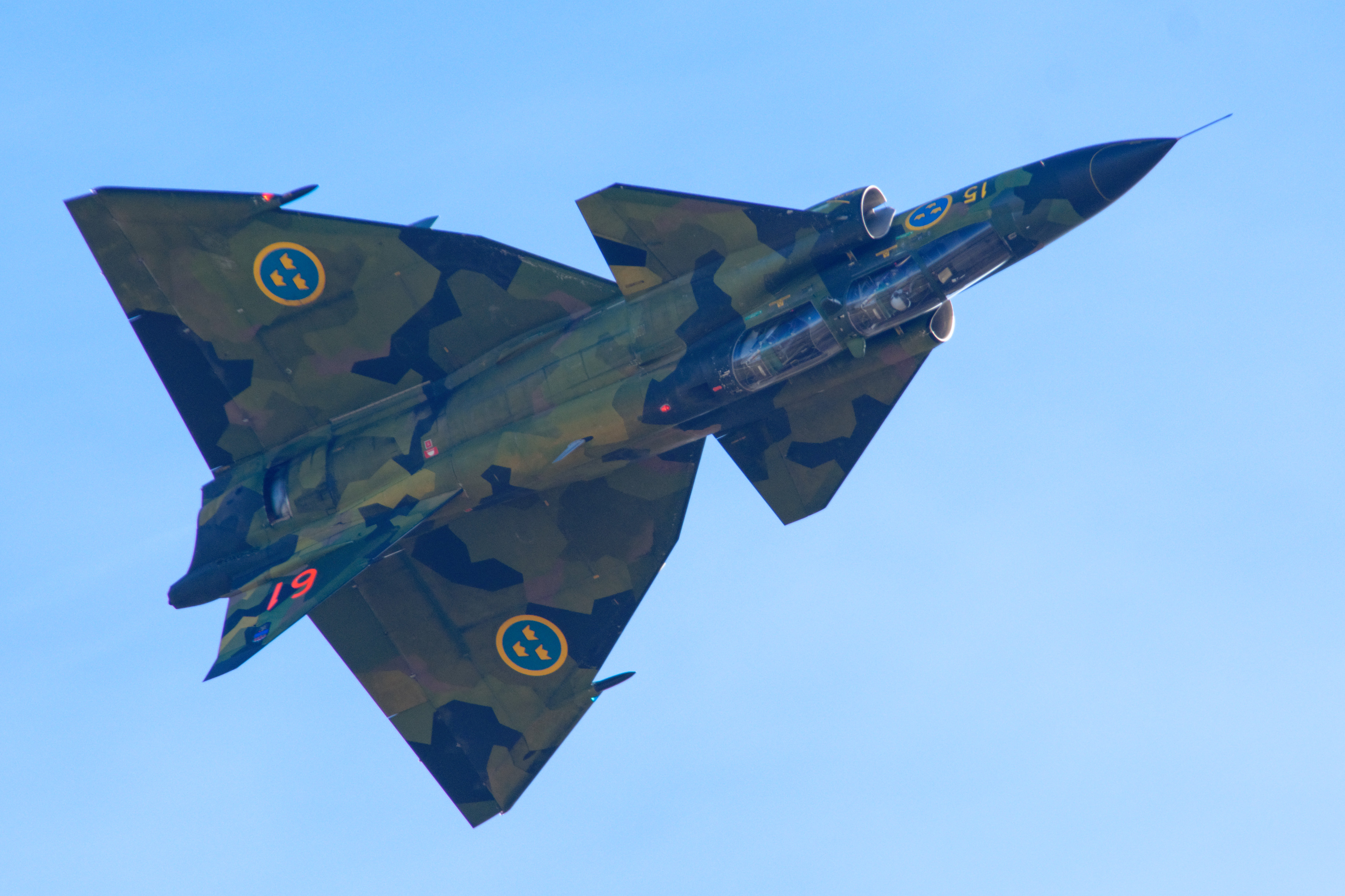
SK37 Viggen in FOA camouflage.

The forerunner of the M90 uniform pattern was a vehicle camouflage known as the FOA camouflage, in reference to the military research institute that developed it.

The Swedish government had decided in the 1960s to fund and develop a domestic camouflage design, instead of copying a pattern used by another nation.

Work on the vehicle camouflage pattern was carried out in the 1970s by FOA scientists through a process of extensive testing and experimentation, including aerial photography missions and field trials. When the pattern was rolled out in the 1970s, it became known as "FOA camouflage", reflecting its origin.

Early use of the FOA camouflage on Swedish aircraft, especially the AJ-37 Viggen, also led to it being referred to as Viggenkamouflage.

=== M90 Uniform Camouflage ===
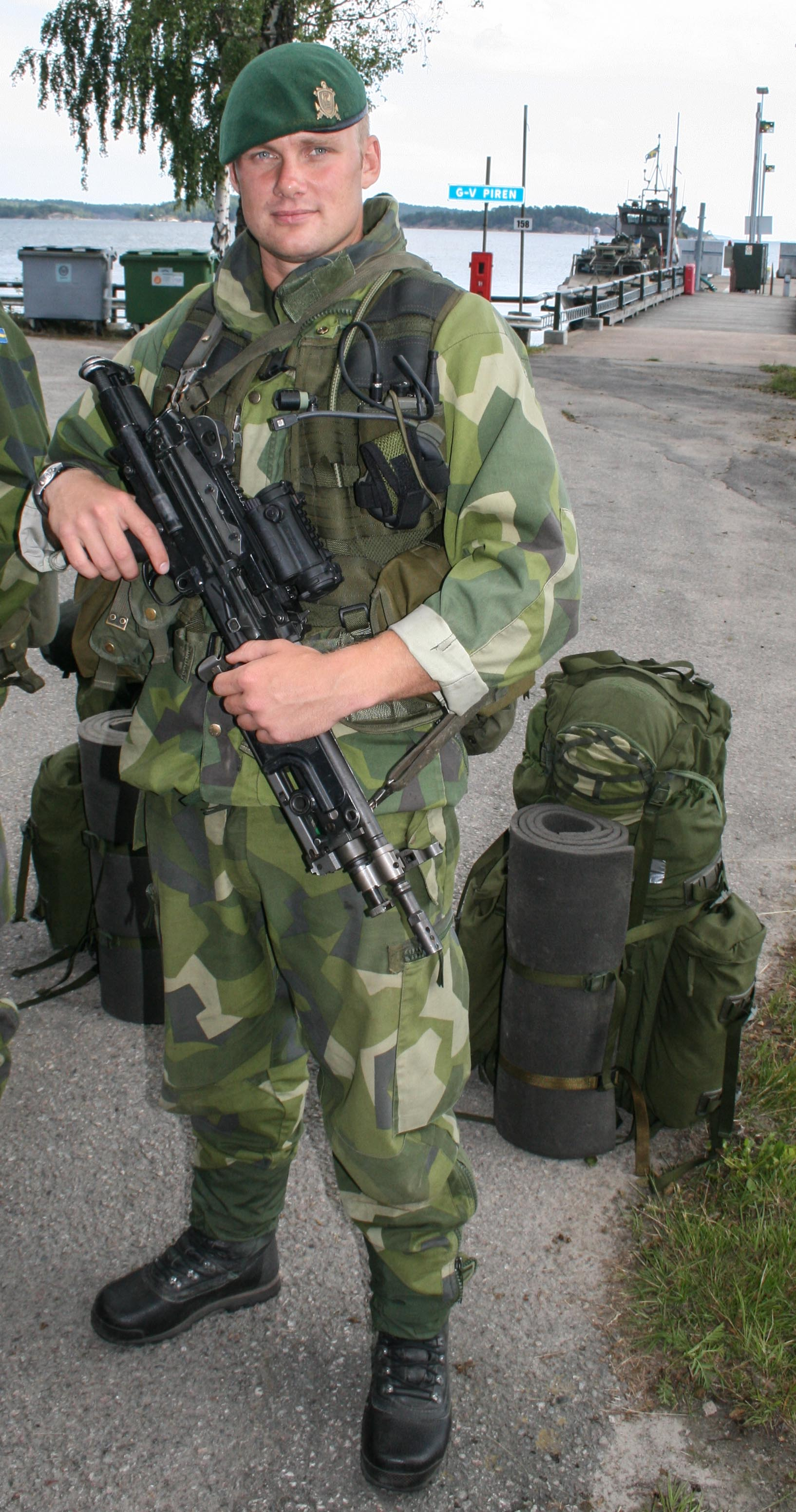
Swedish Marine at Berga navy base.

For the ordinary soldier, Sweden retained its old single-colored field uniforms, the dark olive green M59 (summer) and the all-grey M58 (winter), long after other Western nations developed uniform camouflage.

Only in the 1980s was a decision taken to readapt the vehicle-size FOA pattern, which had been designed to avoid detection by aerial and satellite photography, for use on personal uniforms, which would primarily aim to avoid detection by the naked eye and by binocular. This required a redesign of the pattern.

FOA scientists were again called on to lead the project, redesigning the pattern slightly and reducing its scale by a proportion of 1:66 to fit the entire pattern onto a human torso.

Despite the downscaling, the process nevertheless produced a camouflage pattern with what remains an unusually large and "clean" set of colored fields, in comparison with other nations' camouflage designs. In part, this reflected Swedish operational concerns.

The M90 uniform pattern was ultimately introduced in active service in the late 1980s, and had been adapted by the entire force by the late 1990s.

=== Nordic Combat Uniform era ===
In 2017, a collaborative Nordic government project was launched to jointly acquire standardized uniforms for the Norwegian, Swedish, Finnish, and Danish armed forces, although it was decided that each country would use its own camouflage pattern.

As part of this process, Sweden deliberated whether to update the M90 pattern and, simultaneously, acquire copyright protections for the new version.

In October 2020, the Swedish Patent and Registration Office registered a protected version of the pattern in three iterations: standard/forest, khaki/desert, and winter. The only change to the old pattern was the addition of small, scattered three crowns symbols.

== Design ==
The pattern consists of hard lined geometric shapes, aiming to create a camouflage pattern effective in the temperate forests and plains of Sweden.

=== Philosophy ===
The creation of the camo pattern was in part to guarantee maximum effectiveness in Swedish terrain, but also to ensure that the Swedish Armed Forces would use a recognizably Swedish design.

==== FOA ====
Swedish military doctrine at the time assumed a defensive war against the superior forces of the Soviet Union, which made it too risky for jets to remain on their peacetime bases.

Instead, they would be dispersed across small rural landing strips and pre-positioned depots where they could be serviced by mobile teams, which required a camouflage designed for hiding in forested locations.

==== M90 ====
As Sweden had been a latecomer to camouflage uniforms, the system was considered to be quite advanced for its time and, according to the Swedish army, it remains effective three decades later. Among other things, M90 uniforms are treated to ensure a low visibility when faced with night-time detection gear such as near-infrared spectrum equipment.

According to Hans Kariis, an expert at FOI, which is the successor to FOA:

"If you look at American or German patterns, they're very small. This has to do with the M90 pattern being adapted to the type of combat envisioned at the time. Our pattern works pretty well in forest and mixed [småbruten] terrain, where distances are at a scale of about one kilometer. The Americans are thinking about urban combat, in a city where distances are 10 to 100 meters."

=== Copyright ===
The M90 was not copyrighted by the Swedish government until 2020, and, over the years, it became available on a variety of commercial clothing and other products.

To some experts, commercial use of the M90 was advantageous for the Swedish military, since it allowed personnel to acquire complementary nonstandard civilian gear when necessary, without abandoning the M90 pattern.

Others have countered that the proliferation of non-official M90 products has diluted the symbolic value of the pattern, defeating one of its original purposes – and possibly even raising infiltration risks in the field.

=== Limitations ===
While vehicle camouflage such as the FOA pattern had a proven value as a protection overhead and long-distance reconnaissance, the effectiveness of personal camouflage is in some dispute.

According to experts, the old all-green M59 uniforms often provided similar levels of protection against detection as the camouflage-patterned M90.

It depends on the environment you're in,

according to Kariis.

In some cases [the M90] is better: the pattern breaks up contours and makes it more difficult to spot the contour of a human being. In many other cases the pattern is of equal value to single-color.

== Uniform Models ==
The uniform of the M90 Uniform System is available in several different models. In addition to the standard pattern, which was designed with Swedish forests in mind, desert and winter variants were later developed.

=== M90 ===
The M90 is the standard uniform for general issue throughout the Swedish armed forces. It is affectionately known among Swedish soldiers as "the leaf pile" (Swedish: lövhögen)

=== M90P ===
The P stands for Armour (Swedish: Pansar), and this model is issued to armoured vehicle crews.

It features padding on elbows and knees, suspenders, a shorter jacket, ankle pockets and penholders on the sleeves. It is also made from a heavier material providing better fire protection.

=== M90H ===
The H stands for Helicopter (Swedish: Helikopter).

This is the model issued to helicopter crews. The jacket is bright orange on the inside.

The changing missions for the Swedish armed forces, with a heavier emphasis on missions abroad, has led to two new models.

=== M90L ===
The L stands for Light (Swedish: Lätt).

This uniform is made from thinner fabrics and buttons for rolling up the sleeves. Mostly used in peacetime for domestic indoor and summer use.

=== M90TR ===
The TR stands for Tropic (Swedish: Tropik).

For forces working in rain forest environments.

Similar in appearance to the M90L but the fabric is even thinner and with more subdued colours.

=== M90TR BE ===
The TR stands for Tropic Beige (Swedish: Tropik Beige).

For forces working in desert environments. Similar to the M90TR but with the splinter pattern in desert, khaki colours. The M90TR BE system also includes a smock because nights in desert environments can be very cold.

== Users ==
- Sweden
  - Swedish Armed Forces

== See also ==
- M05
- Xingkong
- MultiCam
- Nordic Combat Uniform
