= Nordic Combat Uniform =

Joint military uniform since 2025

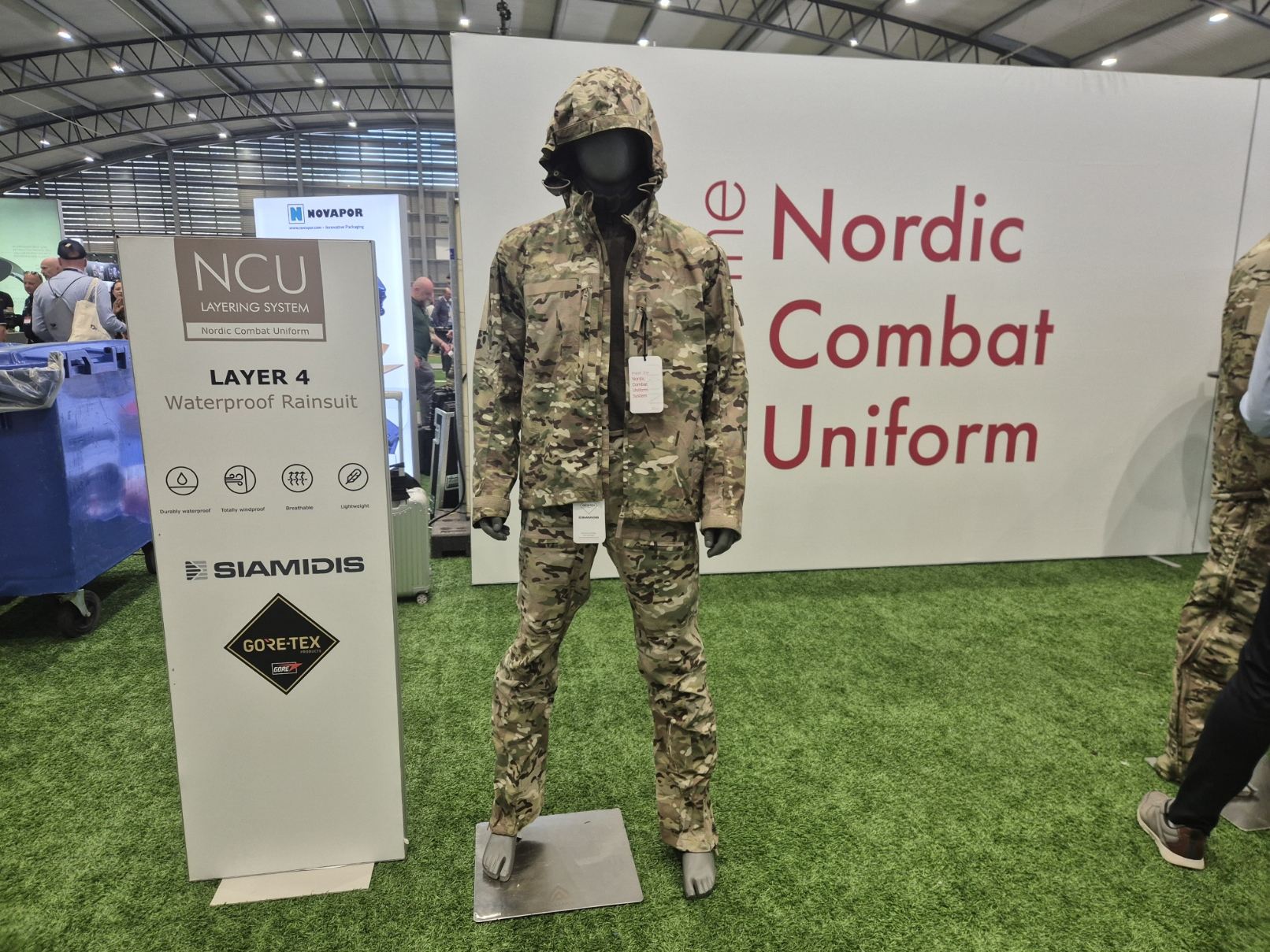
- Danish NCU layer 4, 2025
- Type: Military uniform
- Place of origin: NORDEFCO

Service history
- In service: 2025–present
- Used by: Denmark; Finland; Norway; Sweden

Production history
- Manufacturer: Oskar Pedersen A/S
- Variants: See variants

The Nordic Combat Uniform (NCU) is the joint military uniform system being introduced into the militaries of the Nordic countries, as part of a NORDEFCO initiative. The uniform will be issued in each nations camouflage pattern.

== History ==
In 2015, soldiers expressed wishes for a newer and more modular uniform system. Additionally, there was a wish for increased military cooperation between the Nordic countries. For this reason the Nordic militaries began a shared search for a combat uniform.

In 2018, the countries each provided a list of requirements to suppliers, wanting customization and ability to work in all climates. The NCU will be in each nations camouflage pattern.

In November 2019, uniforms from the four final pre-qualified suppliers were issued to 480 Nordic special forces, soldiers and conscripts for testing.

The total procurement cost was expected to be €400 million.

While it was expected that an agreement for the period 2021–2028, would be concluded by the end of 2020, by 2021, the tender process was not completed, due to the COVID-19 pandemic and the global supply chain crisis.

On 8 February 2022, it was announced that Norwegian consortium Oskar Pedersen A/S, would be chosen to supply the new uniforms to all Nordic countries, at a total cost of €425 million.

In 2024, Eirik Kristoffersen, the Norwegian Chief of Defence, criticized the NCU, as the different types of camouflage patterns made interchangeability between the Nordics difficult. However, in April 2025 Kristoffersen expressed satisfaction that the long-running project is now being rolled out. He emphasized that the process has delivered a strong result and that the uniform represents a clear improvement.

By 2025, both Denmark and Norway experienced problems with the Layer 2 uniform. It was reported that the layer had quality issues causing quick wear and seams were coming undone.

== Design ==
The uniform system will be provided in three configurations; European, desert and jungle where the European configuration is split into two, both a common (intermediate) which goes down to −19 °C (−2 °F) and a so-called "cold add–on" which can go down to −46 °C (−51 °F).

== Controversy ==
Denmark, Norway and Finland have started experiencing tearing and seam issues with the 2A and 2B layers from Oskar Pedersen A/S, further investigation found that the fabric lost its ability to hold together when it got wet or sweaty. Norway has cancelled further deliveries and stopped the issuing of it, as they have deemed the uniform unsuitable for use. Sweden paused its roll out of the uniform as reports of issues appeared Meanwhile Danmark canned the 2 layers and cancelled the navy variant in favour of a solution by Seyntex (working with Crye Precision).

== Layers ==
Image	Layer	Description
	Layer 0+1A	Underwear
	Layer 1B	Terry wool long johns, shirt and jacket.
	Layer 2A	European combat uniform jacket, trousers and shirt.
	Layer 2B	Desert and Jungle uniform jacket, trousers and shirt.
	Layer 3A	Insulation jacket and trousers
	Layer 3B	Cold -add on Insulation jacket and trousers
	Layer 4	Rainwear
	Layer 5	Winter camo

== Variants ==
Country	Camouflage	Ref.
Denmark	M/11 MTS	
Finland	M05	
Norway	Norsk Skog	
Norway	First Entry	
Sweden	M90/M23	

== Users ==
- Denmark Only layer 1, 3A, 3B, 4 and 5
- Finland
- Norway Purchase stop until manufacturing issues can be solved
- Sweden Roll out paused

== See also ==
- Uniforms of the Royal Danish Army
- Swedish military uniforms
