= M05 =

Finnish military camouflage

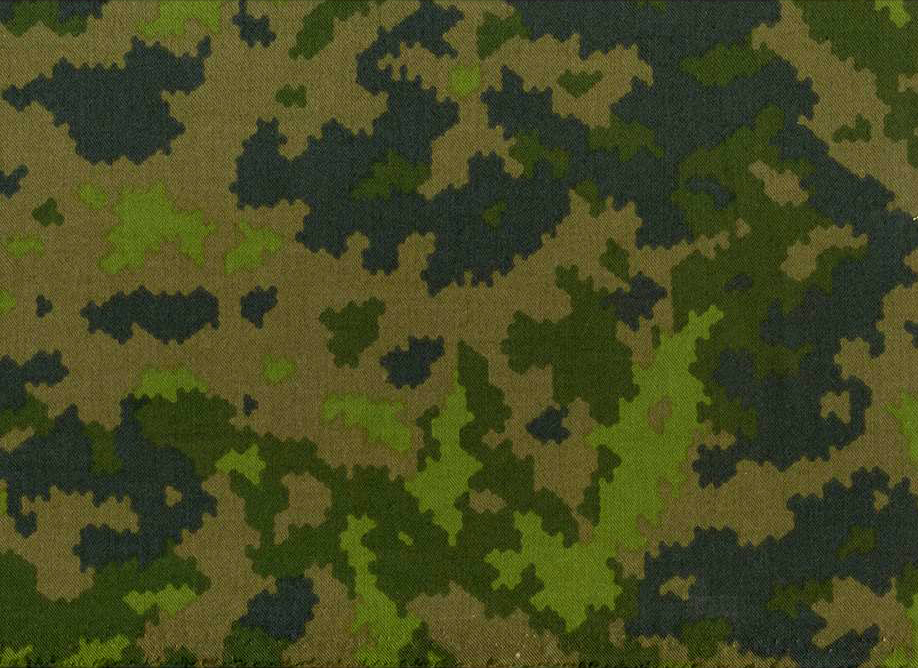
- M05 woodland pattern
- Type: Military camouflage pattern
- Place of origin: Finland

Service history
- In service: 2007-Present
- Used by: See Users

Production history
- Variants: See Patterns

The M05, sometimes known as the M05 Camouflage (Finnish: M05 Maastokuvio), is a family of military camouflage patterns used by the Finnish Defence Forces on uniforms and other equipment. The pattern is licensed by the Finnish Defence Forces and became available to the public on 26 September 2016.

== Design ==
The M05 was made by Pekka Vilhunen with the pattern registered in Finland on May 31, 2007.

The first M05 items were issued to troops around 2007, and have nearly universally replaced the previous M91 pattern in service use. At the same time, the even older M62 pattern is still employed in some niche uses, such as by paratroopers of the Utti Jaeger Regiment due to the cut of the M62 equipment being better suited for parachuting.

The Finnish version of the Nordic Combat Uniform (called M23) that is being brought into service will also use the M05 camouflage pattern family.

== Patterns ==
=== Woodland ===
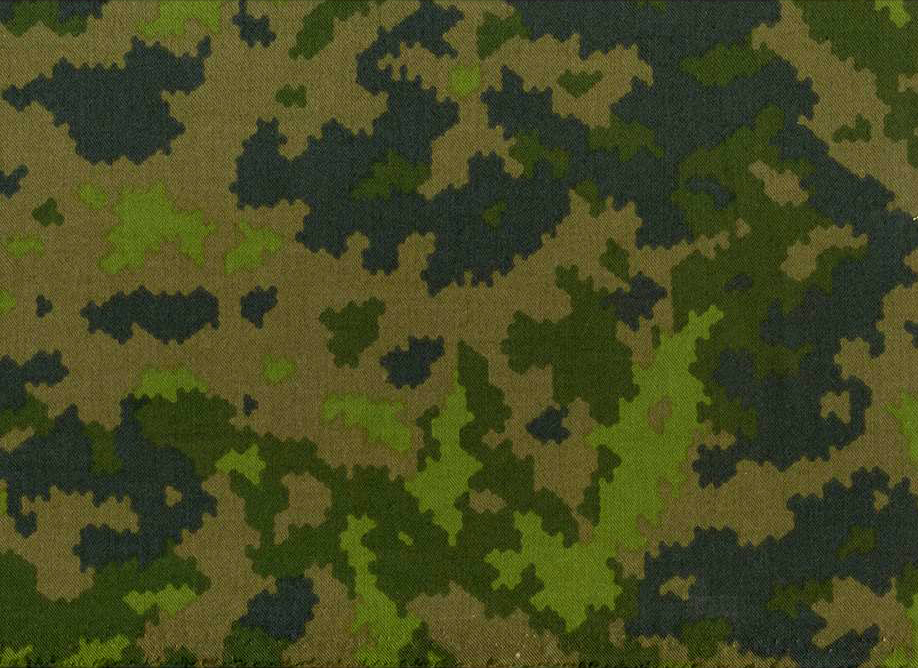
M05 Woodland pattern

The basis of the planning of the new pattern are various photographs of Finnish forests taken by the Finnish Forest Research Institute. The photographs were then digitally edited by the VTT Technical Research Centre of Finland's Information Technology Institute and concentrated into a 4-colour pattern representative of a Finnish forest. Dark charcoal grey, was added to the pattern in order to represent shadowed areas in a forest.

The pattern was field tested several times, leading to small changes. The new pattern was considered to be significantly better than the old M62 and M91 camouflage patterns.

The woodland pattern is used on at least the following FDF equipment:

- M05 Camouflage uniform
- M05 Ripstop cloth hot weather uniform for international forces
- M05 Military police coverall
- M05 Field cap
- M05 Boonie hat
- M05 Reversible helmet cover (Woodland and Snow patterns)
- M05 Flak jacket
- M05 Rain/NBC suit
- M05 Gore-Tex suit for special forces
- M05 Patrol overall for special forces
- Personal camouflage net

=== Snow ===
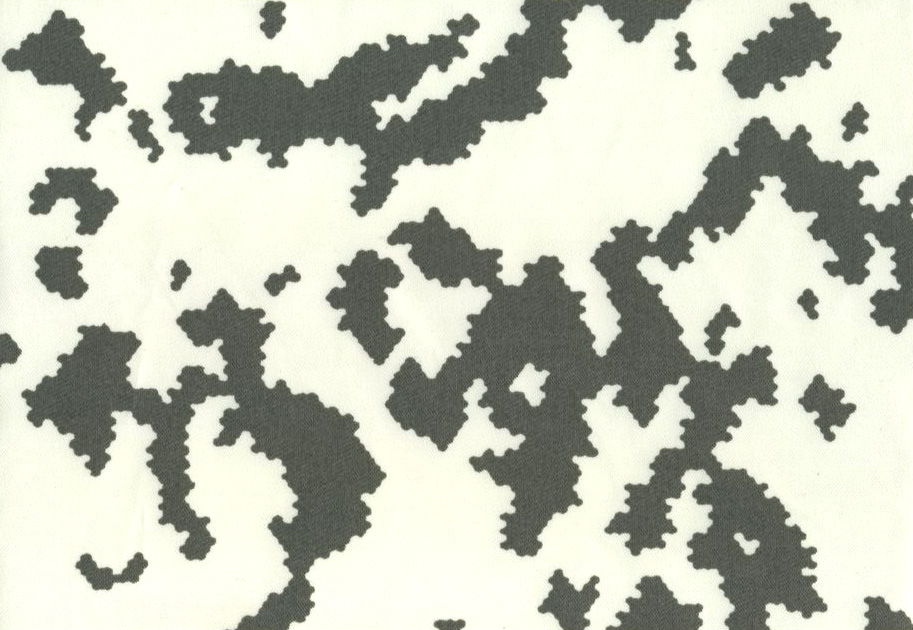
M05 Snow pattern

The snow pattern is a 2-colour version of the M05 woodland pattern. The pattern has been observed to disrupt a soldier's profile so that the new suit cannot be detected at a few dozens of meters' distance in dense snowfall.

The snow pattern is used on the following FDF equipment:

- M05 Snow suit
- M05 Snow overalls (worn over flak and/or assault vests)
- M05 Reversible helmet cover

=== Cold weather ===
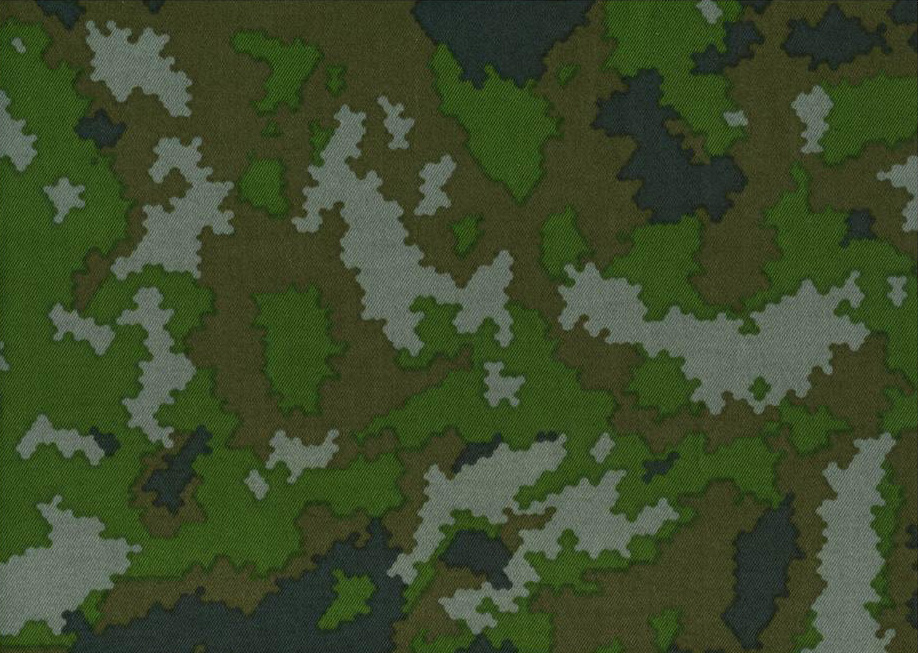
M05 Cold weather pattern

On the cold weather suit (Pakkaspuku) the woodland pattern's light green colour has been replaced by grey, which is a more common colour in the autumn and winter.

The cold weather pattern is used on the following FDF equipment:

- M05 Cold weather suit
- M05 Fur hat

=== Urban ===
At the same time Finnish Defence Forces made new grey-brown camouflage pattern for urban areas, but it is not yet used in clothing or gear.

=== Desert ===
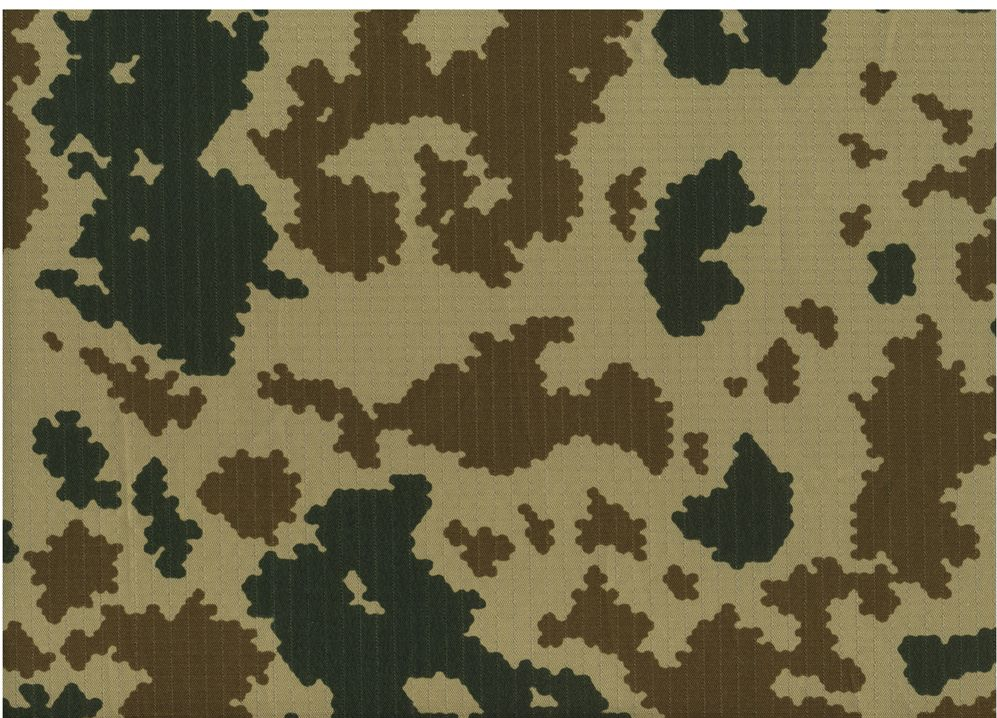
M04 Desert pattern

Originally taken in use before other gear of M05 family, it's officially called the M04.

The first M04 items were taken in use around 2003 by Finnish contingent of UN peacekeeping mission in Eritrea (UNMEE) as a test pattern called K2004. K2004 garments were printed into heavier cloth than current M04 that is printed to Ripstop cloth.

Currently, the pattern is used by FDF international forces in Afghanistan (ISAF). It was also used UN operations in Chad, the Central African Republic (MINURCAT) and Lebanon (UNIFIL II) in desert-based operations.

The desert pattern is used on at least the following FDF equipment:

- M04 Desert hot weather uniform
- M04 Desert hot weather uniform shorts
- M04 Desert boonie hat
- M04 Desert field cap
- M05 Reversible helmet cover (Woodland and Desert patterns)

=== Yagel ===
The commercially produced Russian 'Yagel' (Ягель, Russian: Lichen) camouflage pattern, first came to public notice during the 2008 South Ossetia war where it was seen being worn by MVD Internal Troops. 'Yagel' is a four-colour camouflage, comprising irregularly outlined black, dark green and light green blocks on a wood brown background. It is very similar in appearance to Finnish M05 woodland camouflage pattern.

The resemblance between 'Yagel' and M05 woodland has given rise to numerous claims that Russia has copied the Finnish camouflage pattern. The claims were outlined by Helsingin Sanomat in an article titled "Russians under suspicion for having purloined camouflage design of Finnish Defence Forces" and by Taloussanomat in several articles. The New York Times also covered the issue on November 20, 2008 when Russian special forces were reported to have used it in Georgia.

== Users ==
- Azerbaijan: M04 used by Azerbaijani Ministry of Internal Affairs.
- Finland: Used by Finnish military.
- Russia: Uses the Yagel clone. Known to be used by MVD special forces units.
