= Western Military Region (Sweden) =

- Västra militärregionen
- Active: 2013–present
- Country: Sweden
- Allegiance: Swedish Armed Forces
- Branch: Joint
- Type: Military region
- Role: Operational, territorial and tactical activities
- Part of: Swedish Armed Forces Headquarters (Note: In the years 2013–2019, the military region staff was subordinate to the commander of Skaraborg Regiment, and since 2020 its directly subordinate to the Chief of Home Guard.)
- Garrison/HQ: Skövde garrison

Commanders
- Current commander: COL Stefan Smedman

The Western Military Region (Swedish: Västra militärregionen, MR N) is a Swedish military region within the Swedish Armed Forces. Established in 2013, the military region staff in based in Skövde. The military region includes Halland County, Värmland County, Västra Götaland County and Örebro County.

== History ==
The Western Military Region was formed on 1 January 2013 as Military Region West, as one of four military regions in Sweden. The military region includes Halland County, Värmland County, Västra Götaland County and Örebro County. The region's staff is located in Skövde with the task of leading surveillance and protection tasks, implementing civil-military cooperation and support to society. The Western Military Region's Home Guard battalions are 10 in number. On 1 October 2018, a separate command position was appointed for Military Region West. From 2019, the name Western Military Region was adopted. From 1 January 2020, all military regions are independent units subordinate to the Chief of Home Guard. In doing so, the regions also take over the command in peacetime from the training groups with their Home Guard battalions. Each military region has production management responsibility. This meant that five training groups were transferred from Skaraborg Regiment to the Western Military Region.In a government's bill, however, the Swedish government emphasized that the military regional division could be adjusted, depending on the outcome of the investigation Ansvar, ledning och samordning inom civilt försvar ("Responsibility, leadership and coordination in civil defense").

== Units ==
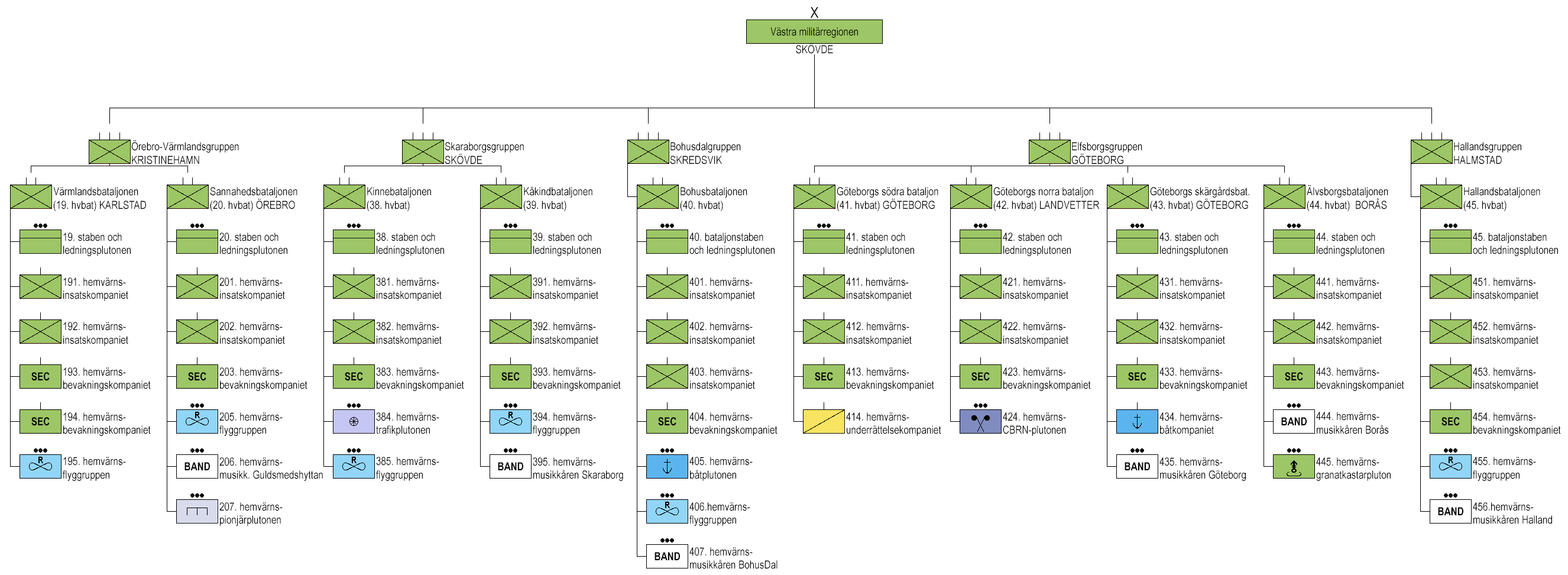
Western Military Region organization as of April 2026 (click to enlarge)

- Örebro- och Värmlandsgruppen (ÖVG)
  - 19th Home Guard Battalion/Värmland Battalion
  - 20th Home Guard Battalion/Sannahed Battalion
- Skaraborgsgruppen (SBG)
  - 38th Home Guard Battalion/Kinne Battalion
  - 39th Home Guard Battalion/Kåkind Battalion
- Bohusdalsgruppen (BDG)
  - 40th Home Guard Battalion/Bohus Battalion
- Elfsborgsgruppen (EBG)
  - 41st Home Guard Battalion/Southern Gothenburg Battalion
  - 42nd Home Guard Battalion/Northern Gothenburg Battalion
  - 43rd Home Guard Battalion/Gothenburg Archipelago Battalion
  - 44th Home Guard Battalion/Älvsborg Battalion
- Hallandsgruppen (HLG)
  - 45th Home Guard Battalion/Halland Battalion

== Heraldry and traditions ==
=== Coat of arms ===
The coat of arms of the Western Military Region was previously used by the Southern Military District (Milo S) from 1994 to 2000 and the Southern Military District (MD S) from 2000 to 2005. Blazon: "Azure, with waves argent six times divided bendy-sinister argent, charged with a doubletailed crowned lion rampant or, armed and langued gules. The shield surmounted an erect sword or."

== Commanding officers ==
From 2013 to 2017, the military region commander was also commander of the Norrbotten Regiment. From 2018 to 2020, military region commander was subordinate to the Chief of Joint Operations in territorial activities as well as in operations. Furthermore, the military region commander has territorial responsibility over his own military region and leads territorial activities as well as regional intelligence and security services. From 1 January 2020, all military region commanders are subordinate to the Chief of Home Guard.

- 2013–2017: Colonel Fredrik Ståhlberg
- 2017–2017: Colonel Bengt Alexandersson (Note: Bengt Alexandersson took office on 1 April 2017.)
- 2018–2026: Colonel Peter Hederstedt (Note: Peter Hederstedt took office on 1 January 2018, with an appointment no later than 31 March 2021. In 2020, his appointment was extended, however, until 31 December 2023. In 2023, his appointment was extended, however, until 31 August 2024. In 2024, his appointment was extended, however, until 31 August 2026.)
- 2026-04-01 – present: Colonel Stefan Smedman

== Names, designations and locations ==
Name	Translation	From		To
Militärregion Väst	Military Region West	2013-01-01	–	2018-12-31
Västra militärregionen	Western Military Region	2019-01-01	–	
Designation		From		To
MR V		2013-01-01	–	
Location		From		To
Skövde Garrison		2013-01-01	–	

== See also ==
- Western Military District (Milo V)
