= Fredrik Ståhlberg =

Swedish major general

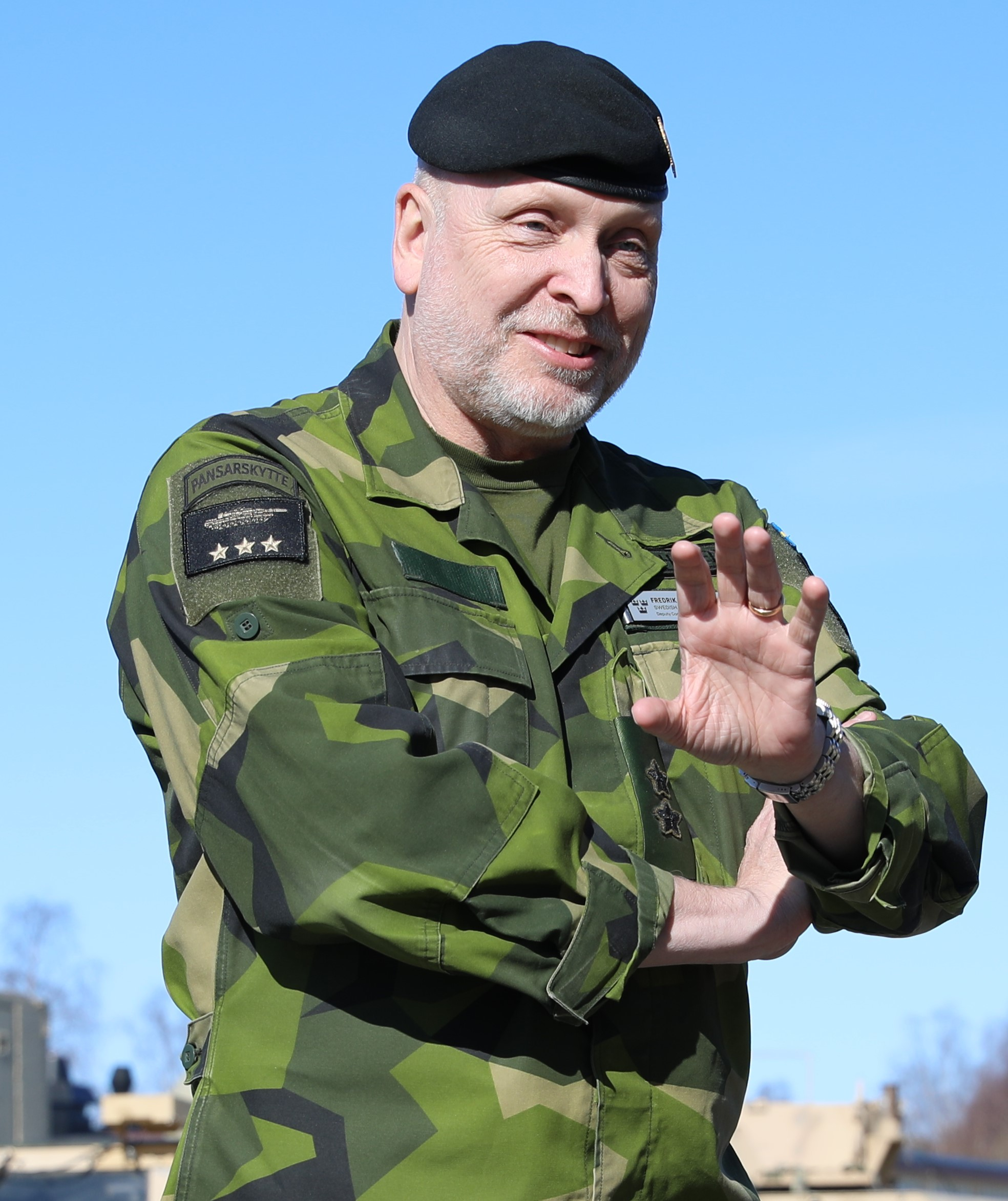
- Ståhlberg in 2024.
- Born: Nils Fredrik Adam Ståhlberg; 24 August 1966 (age 60); Skövde, Sweden
- Military career
- Allegiance: Sweden
- Branch: Swedish Army
- Service years: 1989–present
- Rank: Major General
- Commands: Skaraborg Regiment; Western Military Region; Land Component Command; Deputy Chief of Army; Deputy Vice Chancellor, Swedish Defence University; Deputy Director of Human Resources; Deputy Chief of Joint Operations; NNSC
- Conflicts: Bosnian War; War in Afghanistan

Major General Nils Fredrik Adam Ståhlberg (born 24 August 1966) is a Swedish Army officer. Since April 2025, Ståhlberg serves as head of the Swedish delegation to the Neutral Nations Supervisory Commission (NNSC) in Korea. Prior to that, Ståhlberg served as commanding officer of the Western Military Region (2013–2017), as Chief of the Land Component Command (2017–2018), as Deputy Chief of Army (2017–2020), as Deputy Vice Chancellor of the Swedish Defence University (2020–2022), as Deputy Director of Human Resources (2021), and as Deputy Chief of Joint Operations (2023–2025).

== Early life ==
Ståhlberg was born on 24 August 1966 in Skövde, Sweden. He grew up in Karlsborg and moved to Skövde in 1986 to do his military service as company commander in Skaraborg Regiment (P 4). Then he had no intention of becoming an officer but the plan was to study economics at the University of Gothenburg, but his platoon leader saw the potential and encouraged him to apply for officer training.

== Career ==
Ståhlberg graduated from the Military Academy Karlberg in 1989 and was commissioned as an officer and appointed second lieutenant the same year. In 1990–1991 he attended the General Course at the Royal Swedish Army Staff College and in 1991 was promoted to lieutenant. After taking the Higher Course at the Royal Swedish Army Staff College from 1992 to 1993 he was promoted to captain in 1993. From 1995 to 1996 he was Deputy Company Commander of the Implementation Force in Bosnia and Herzegovina, after which he took the Tactical Course at the Swedish Armed Forces Staff College (the Swedish National Defence College from 1 January 1997) from 1996 to 1997. In 1997 he was promoted to major, after which he served as company commander at the Combat School South (Stridsskola Syd, SSS) from 1997 to 1998 and company commander at Skaraborg Regiment and Skaraborg Brigade from 1998 to 1999. He attended the Management Course at the Swedish National Defence College from 1999 to 2001 and served from 2001 to 2003 in the Joint Forces Command at the Swedish Armed Forces Headquarters with defence planning and doctrine development within J5 and as head of field exercises. In 2003, he was promoted to lieutenant colonel and he served from 2003 to 2005 as ADC to Minister of Defence Leni Björklund. He was head of education from 2005 to 2007 at Skaraborg Regiment, and served in 2008 as chief of staff in Afghanistan and was from 2009 to 2012 the chief of staff at the Land Component Command in the Swedish Armed Forces Headquarters.

After being promoted to colonel, Ståhlberg served as commander of the Skaraborg Regiment from 2012 to 2017 and also commander of the Western Military Region from 2013 to 2017. He was then project manager in the Training & Procurement Staff at the Swedish Armed Forces Headquarters from 1 April to 30 September 2017. From 1 October 2017, Ståhlberg was brigadier general and Chief of the Land Component Command in the Joint Support Staff (Insatsstaben, INSS STAB) at the Swedish Armed Forces Headquarters. Between September 2017 and February 2020, Ståhlberg also served as Deputy Chief of Army. Ståhlberg took over as head of education and Deputy Vice Chancellor of the Swedish Defence University on 1 February 2020. On 1 August 2022, Ståhlberg assumed the post of Deputy Director of Human Resources of the Swedish Armed Forces with an appointment until 31 December 2022. Ståhlberg was promoted to major general on 1 January 2023 and assumed the position of Deputy Chief of Joint Operations.

On 28 April 2025, he succeeded Major General Lena Persson Herlitz as head of the Swedish delegation to the Neutral Nations Supervisory Commission (NNSC) in Korea.

== Personal life ==
He is married to Jeanette Ståhlberg with whom he has two children, Beatrice and Alexander.

== Dates of rank ==
- 1989 – Second lieutenant
- 1991 – Lieutenant
- 1993 – Captain
- 1997 – Major
- 2003 – Lieutenant colonel
- 2012 – Colonel
- 1 October 2017 – Brigadier general
- 1 January 2023 – Major general

== Awards and decorations ==
=== Swedish ===
- (Sweden) For Zealous and Devoted Service of the Realm
- (Sweden) Swedish Armed Forces Conscript Medal
- (Sweden) Swedish Armed Forces International Service Medal
- (Sweden) Swedish Federation for Voluntary Defence Education and Training Merit Badge in gold (May 2018)
- (Sweden) Skaraborg Regiment and Skaraborg Brigade (MekB 9) Medal of Merit in gold (31 March 2017)
- (Sweden) Home Guard Silver Medal

etc.

=== Foreign ===
- United Nations Medal (UNPROFOR)
- NATO medal for the former Yugoslavia
- NATO Non-Article 5 medal for ISAF

etc.

== Honours and memberships ==
- Member of the Royal Swedish Academy of War Sciences (2018)
- Member of the board of the Association for the Mounted Guard (Föreningen för den Beridna Högvakten)
- Chairman of the Swedish Federation for Voluntary Defence Education and Training – Skaraborg

Military offices
Preceded by Ronald Månsson	Skaraborg Regiment; 2012–2017	Succeeded by Bengt Alexandersson
Preceded by None	Western Military Region; 2013–2017	Succeeded by Bengt Alexandersson
Preceded by Stefan Andersson	Land Component Command; 2017–2018	Succeeded by None
Preceded by ?	Deputy Chief of Army; 2017–2020	Succeeded by Laura Swaan Wrede
Preceded by Ewa Skoog Haslum	Deputy Vice Chancellor of the Swedish Defence University; 2020–2022	Succeeded by Anders Persson
Preceded by Jonas Wikman	Deputy Chief of Joint Operations; 2023–2025	Succeeded by Johan Axelsson
Preceded by Lena Persson Herlitz	Head of Swedish Delegation to NNSC; 2025–present	Succeeded by Incumbent
