= Director of Human Resources (Swedish Armed Forces) =

- Personaldirektör
- Incumbent; Kim-Lena Ekvall Svedenblad since 1 January 2023
- Swedish Armed Forces
- Type: Director of human resources
- Abbreviation: PERSDIR
- Member of: Defence Board
- Reports to: Chief of the Defence Staff
- Seat: Swedish Armed Forces Headquarters, Lidingövägen 24, Stockholm
- Term length: No fixed term
- Constituting instrument: FFS 2013:4, Chapter 14; FFS 2016:2, Chapter 8 FIB 2020:5, Chapter 8
- First holder: Gösta Sandgren
- Deputy: Deputy Director Human Resources

The Director of Human Resources (Swedish: Personaldirektör, PERSDIR) is the director of human resources of the Swedish Armed Forces. PERSDIR, which heads the Defence Staff's Human Resources Department (Note: Försvarsstabens HR-avdelning (FST HR). Previously called the Ledningsstabens personalavdelning (LEDS PERS).), is an administrative position based at the Swedish Armed Forces Headquarters in Stockholm. The PERSDIR is part of the Defence Board (Försvarsmaktsledningen, FML), a group of the Supreme Commander's top commanders.

== Tasks ==
The Director of Human Resources shall lead and coordinate the agency's human resources. The task includes leading and coordinating training courses with central admission and deciding on the appointment and placement of executives at level OF-4 (lieutenant colonel and commander) and OF-5 (colonel and captain) and as well as the CF 4 and 5, officers with special competence (OFSK), OR 9, doctoral students and doctoral candidates and OF-3 (major and lieutenant commander) with completed higher officer program part 1 (HOP 1). The Director of Human Resources must support the Supreme Commander of the Swedish Armed Forces and heads directly subordinates to the Supreme Commander in the role of employer representative and with the systematic occupational safety and health work. The task includes gender equality work, social equality work, värdegrund work, psychological defence with the support of the Chief of Armed Forces Training & Procurement, rehabilitation work and health care including physical training. The Director of Human Resources is the Swedish Armed Forces' Chief of Training.

The Director of Human Resources shall prepare documentation for the orientation of human resources in the Armed Forces' Strategic Orientation (Försvarsmaktens Strategiska Inriktning, FMSI) and the Armed Forces' Operational Plan (Försvarsmaktens verksamhetsplan, FMVP). The Director of Human Resources is authorized to represent the Swedish Armed Forces in central employer matters in contact with other government agencies and organizations and to prepare and sign the Armed Forces' collective agreement within the framework of the financial conditions specified by the Chief of Defence Staff. The Director of Human Resources may draw up and propose regulations, internal regulations and general advice for human resources, veterans activities and systematic occupational safety and health work.

The Director of Human Resources decides:

1. manuals for human resources, veterans operations and systematic occupational safety and health work after consultation with the Chief of Armed Forces Training & Procurement, as well as with the Chief of Joint Operations or the Director of Military Intelligence and Security if these are concerned,
2. admission to and separation from education programs with central admission,
3. joint agency requirements regarding selection, admission and training for all personnel, and
4. appointment of OF/CF-4 and 5, officers with special competence (OFSK), OR-9, doctoral student and doctoral candidates and OF-3 with completed HOP 1.

In the Swedish Armed Forces' regulations (FFS 2019:3) on basic officer training and rank codes and in the Swedish Armed Forces' regulations (FFS 2019:7) on promotion and appointment, there are additional powers for the Director of Human Resources. The Director of Human Resources is authorized to enter into agreements and contracts with government agencies, municipalities, regions, organizations and individuals.

The Director of Human Resources is the Swedish Armed Forces' Chief of Training. The Swedish Armed Forces' Chief of Training reports to the Chief of Armed Forces Training & Procurement regarding planning, implementation and follow-up of the activities at Military Academy Karlberg/Military Academy Halmstad and the Swedish Armed Forces Human Resources Centre (Försvarsmaktens HR-centrum, FM HRC) as well as the Swedish Armed Forces' training operations.

== Directors of Human Resources ==
No.	Portrait	Director	Took office	Left office	Time in office	Defence branch	Supreme Commander	Ref.
1	Gösta Sandgren	Gösta Sandgren (born 1950)	2000	2004	3–4 years	–	Johan Hederstedt	
–	Bengt Axelsson	Brigadier general Bengt Axelsson (born 1956); Acting	2006	2008	1–2 years	Army	Håkan Syrén	
2	Lars Norrström	Lars Norrström (born 1950)	2006	2009	2–3 years	–	Håkan Syrén	
–	Patrik Dahle	Brigadier general Patrik Dahle (born 1963); Acting	2009	2010	0–1 years	Air Force	Sverker Göranson	
3	Per-Olof Stålesjö	Per-Olof Stålesjö (born 1962)	11 January 2010	2016	5–6 years	–	Sverker Göranson; Micael Bydén	
–	Klas Eksell	Brigadier general Klas Eksell (born 1960); Acting	1 July 2016	31 October 2016	122 days	Army	Micael Bydén	
4	Klas Eksell	Major general Klas Eksell (born 1960)	1 November 2016	2022	5–6 years	Army	Micael Bydén	
5	Kim-Lena Ekvall Svedenblad	Kim-Lena Ekvall Svedenblad (born 1964)	1 January 2023	Incumbent	3 years, 249 days	–	Micael Bydén; Michael Claesson	

== Deputy Directors of Human Resources ==
No.	Portrait	Deputy Director	Took office	Left office	Time in office	Defence branch	Supreme Commander	Ref.
–	Bengt Axelsson	Brigadier general Bengt Axelsson (born 1956)	2007	2008	0–1 years	Army	Håkan Syrén	
–	Patrik Dahle	Brigadier general Patrik Dahle (born 1963)	January 2009	July 2012	2–3 years	Air Force	Håkan Syrén; Sverker Göranson	
–	Klas Eksell	Brigadier general Klas Eksell (born 1960)	1 January 2013	31 October 2016	2–3 years	Army	Sverker Göranson; Micael Bydén	
–	Stina Nyström	Stina Nyström	3 April 2017	May 2020	2–3 years	–	Micael Bydén	
–	Fredrik Ståhlberg	Brigadier general Fredrik Ståhlberg (born 1966)	1 August 2022	31 December 2022	152 days	Army	Micael Bydén	
–	Anders Widén	Captain (N); Anders Widén (born ?)	1 January 2023	2024	-	Navy	Micael Bydén	
–	Fredrik Peedu	Captain (N); Fredrik Peedu (born ?)	1 February 2024	9 February 2025	1 year, 8 days	Navy	Micael Bydén; Michael Claesson	
–	Eva-Marie Winblad Österlind	Eva-Marie Winblad Österlind (born 1971); Acting	10 February 2025	13 June 2025	123 days	–	Michael Claesson	
–	Jonas Karlsson [sv]	Jonas Karlsson (born 1967)	13 June 2025	Incumbent	1 year, 86 days	Army	Michael Claesson	
