= Southern Military District (MD S) =

- Södra militärdistriktet
- Active: 2000–2005
- Country: Sweden
- Allegiance: Swedish Armed Forces
- Branch: Joint service
- Type: Military district
- Role: Operational, territorial and tactical operations
- Part of: Swedish Armed Forces Headquarters
- Garrison/HQ: Gothenburg
- Colors: Blue and white
- March: "På marsch" (Rydberg) (Note: The unit march was adopted in 2000 and was established on 27 November 2002. The march was used from 1994 to 2000 by the Southern Military District (Milo S) and since 2020 of the Southern Military Region.)

The Southern Military District (Swedish: Södra militärdistriktet, MD S) was a military district within the Swedish Armed Forces from 2000 to 2005. Its staff was located in Gothenburg, Sweden. The military district included Jönköping, Kalmar, Blekinge, Skåne, Halland and Västra Götaland counties.

== History ==
Prior to Defence Act of 2000, the Swedish government proposed in its bill to the Riksdag that the tactical level should be reduced by the decommissioning of divisional and defence district staffs as well as naval commands and air commands. This in order to design an Army Tactical Command, Navy Tactical Command and Air Force Tactical Command which would be co-located with the Joint Operations Command (Operationsledningen, OpL). The proposal meant that all territorial staffs would be disbanded, which meant, among other things, the decommissioning of military district staffs. Instead, on 1 July 2000, four military districts were formed, which in principle corresponded geographically to the former military districts (1966–1990s). The big difference was that the military district was the lowest level at which the commander was territorially responsible. In the military districts, military district groups (militärdistriktsgrupp) were organized after the previous division of defence districts, which in the Southern Military District corresponded to eleven military district groups.

Prior to the Defence Act of 2004, the Swedish government proposed to the Riksdag, on a proposal from the Swedish Armed Forces, to reduce the number of military district groups, where the military district groups in Borås, Hässleholm and Kalmar within the Southern Military District were proposed to be disbanded. According to the Swedish Armed Forces, fewer Home Guard units would be organized, but better trained and fulfilled units. The Defence Act meant that Kalmargruppen, Skånska dragongruppen and the Älvsborgsgruppen were disbanded on 30 June 2005, and its tasks were taken over on 1 July 2005 by the Kronobergsgruppen, Södra skånska gruppen and the Göteborgsgruppen, respectively. Furthermore, Gotland Military District (MD G) was also disbanded, which meant that the Gotlandsgruppen was transferred from 1 January 2005 to the Central Military District.

Prior to the Defence Act, the Swedish Armed Forces had proposed three alternatives to a changed military district organization. The first course of action was to maintain the military district organization. The second course of action would be to merge the military district staff with a training unit. The third course of action would be to disband the military district organization and transfer responsibility for the territorial operations to the Joint Forces Command (OPIL). That a change in the military district organization was necessary was shared by both the government, the Swedish Armed Forces and the Swedish Parliamentary Defence Commission (Försvarsberedningen). Both the government and the Defence Commission felt that the issue needed further consideration before a parliamentary decision was possible. The government's main alternative, however, was that the organization should be disbanded.

On 2 June 2005, the Swedish government presented its bill (2004/05:160) on the decommissioning of the military district organization. In the bill, the government referred to that "In the future "operational defence" (Swedish: insatsförsvar) and the decided operational organization, there is no longer a requirement or need for regional or territorial command that justifies a specific command organization". In this way, the government considered that the military district organization could be disbanded, which was also proposed by the Swedish Armed Forces in a petition to the government on 7 March 2005. Instead, four Security and Cooperation Sections would be set up, where the sections would be located to Boden, Stockholm, Gothenburg and Malmö. On 16 November 2005, the Riksdag decided that the military district organization should be disbanded on 31 December 2005, which meant that the military district groups were reorganized into training groups (utbildningsgrupper) and subordinated to a training unit (utbildningsförband). As a result, all military district groups were transferred from the Southern Military District (MD S) and became subordinated from 1 January 2006 of the Göta Engineer Regiment (Ing 2), Air Defence Regiment (Lv 6), Skaraborg Regiment (P 4), South Scanian Regiment (P 7), Swedish Armed Forces Medical Center (FSC) and the Naval Base (MarinB).

On Friday, 16 December 2005, a ceremony was held on the occasion of the disbandment of the Southern Military District with staff in Gothenburg. During the ceremony in Gothenburg Garrison, Colonel Göran Boijsen, commander of the Southern Military District handed over the command sign to the Supreme Commander of the Swedish Armed Forces's representative, Lieutenant General Claes-Göran Fant. From 21 December 2005, the Chief of Operations at the Swedish Armed Forces Headquarters took over military territorial responsibility. The disbandment ceremony was marked by music and speeches. The music was provided by the Home Guard Music Corps in Gothenburg. Speeches were given by Colonel Göran Boijsen and Lieutenant General Claes-Göran Fant. Among the invited guests were the Director of Defense (försvarsdirektör) Lennart Olofsson and Krister Jacobsson, the Chief Commissioner (länspolismästare) of Västra Götaland County. From 1 January 2006, the Southern Military District merged into a decommission organization, which operated until 30 June 2006.

== Units ==
=== 2000–2005 ===
- Blekingegruppen, Karlskrona
- BohusDalgruppen, Uddevalla
- Göteborgsgruppen, Göteborg
- Älvsborgsgruppen, Borås
- Hallandsgruppen, Halmstad
- Kalmargruppen, Kalmar
- Kronobergsgruppen, Växjö
- Norra Smålandsgruppen, Eksjö
- Skaraborgsgruppen, Skövde
- Skånska dragongruppen, Hässleholm
- Södra skånska gruppen, Revingehed

=== 2005–2005 ===
A new organization was adopted on 1 July 2005, when the military district groups in Borås, Hässleholm and Kalmar were disbanded on 30 June 2005.

- Blekingegruppen, Karlskrona
- BohusDalgruppen, Uddevalla
- Elfsborgsgruppen, Gothenburg
- Hallandsgruppen, Halmstad
- Kalmar- och Kronobergsgruppen, Växjö
- Norra Smålandsgruppen, Eksjö
- Skaraborgsgruppen, Skövde
- Skånska gruppen, Revingehed

== Barracks ==
The Southern Military District's staff with command resources was grouped on Käringberget in Gothenburg, where they took over premises from the West Coast Naval Command, which was disbanded on 30 June 2000. A small part of the staff was located in Scania, Ledningsgrupp Malmö ("Command Group Malmö"), which was initially located in the Scanian Anti-Aircraft Corps' former unit area in Husie. It later moved to central Malmö on Terminalgatan 18. After the Southern Military District was disbanded, the premises in Gothenburg were taken over by the Swedish Armed Forces Medical Center (FSC).

== Heraldry and traditions ==
=== Coat of arms ===
The coat of the arms of the Southern Military District Staff (Milo S) 1994–2000, and the Southern Military District Staff (MD N) 2000–2005. Blazon: "Azure, with waves argent six times divided bendy-sinister argent, charged with a doubletailed crowned lion rampant or, armed and langued gules. The shield surmounted an erect sword or".

=== Colours, standards and guidons ===
The command flag of the commanding officer of the Southern Military District is drawn by Kristina Holmgård-Åkerberg and embroidered by hand in insertion technique by Sofie Thorburn. Blazon: "On blue cloth an erect yellow sword; in the first corner a yellow lion rampant with an open crown".

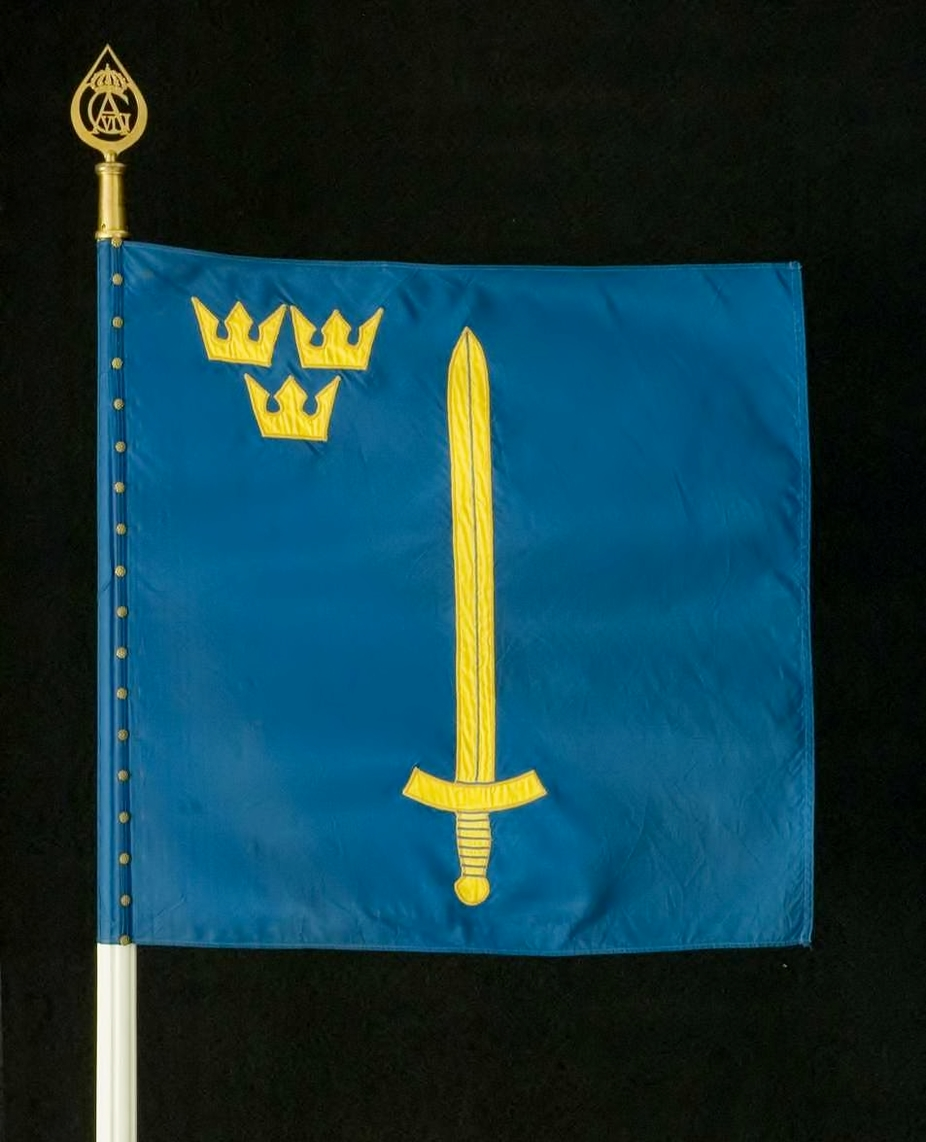
Command flag 2000–2003.

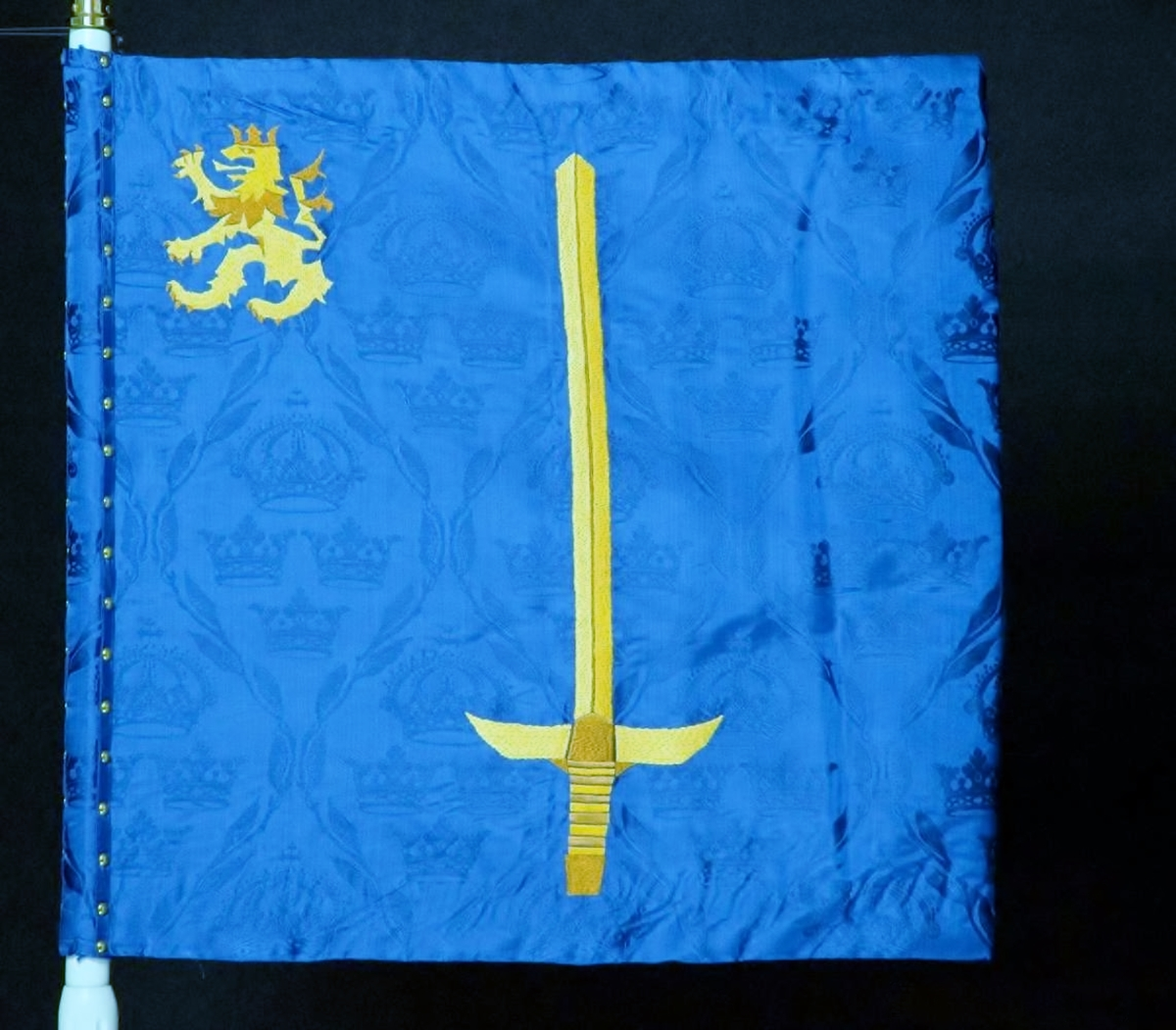
Command flag 2003–2005.

=== Medals ===
In 2001, the Södra militärdistriktets (MD S) förtjänstmedalj ("Southern Military District Medal of Merit") in gold (MDSGM) of the 8th size was established. The medal is oval in shape. The medal ribbon is of red moiré with broad dark blue edges and a green stripe in the middle followed on both sides with a broader yellow stripe.

In 2001, the Södra militärdistriktets (MD S) minnesmedalj ("Southern Military District Commemorative Medal") in silver (MDMSM) of the 8th size was established. The medal is oval in shape. The medal ribbon is of red moiré with broad dark blue edges and a green stripe in the middle followed on both sides with a broader yellow stripe. A miniature of the coat of arms of the district is attached to the ribbon bar.

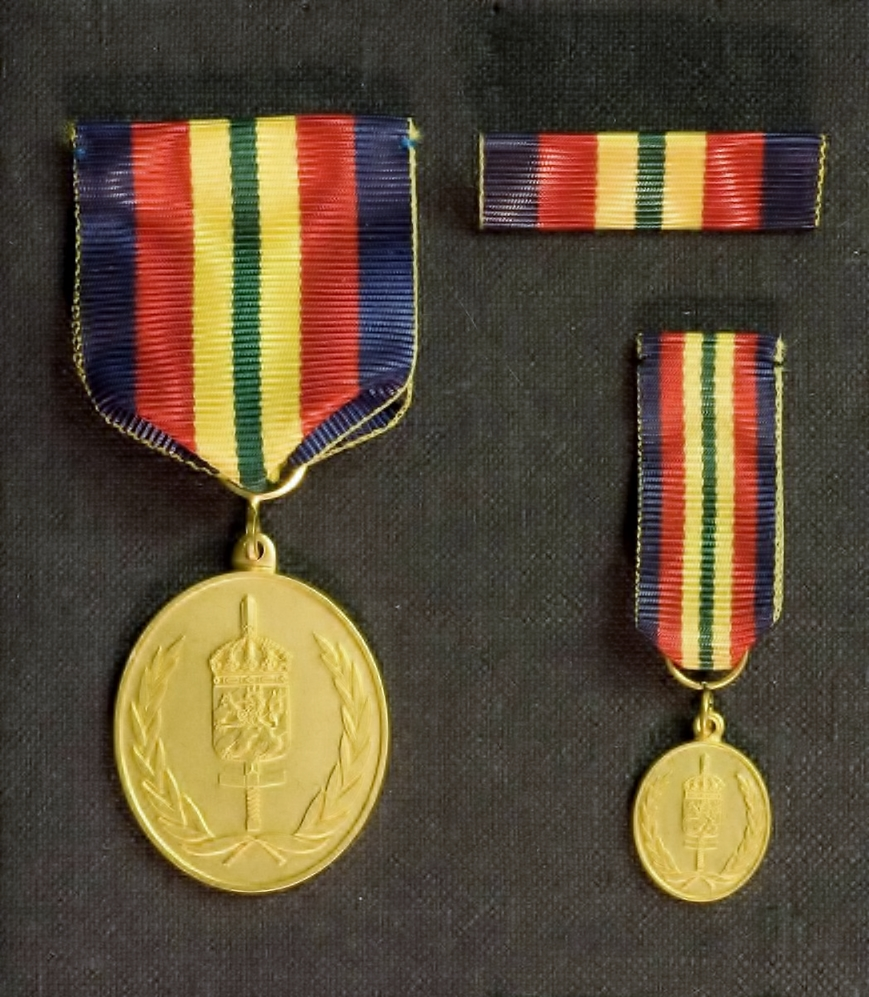
Medal of Merit in gold.

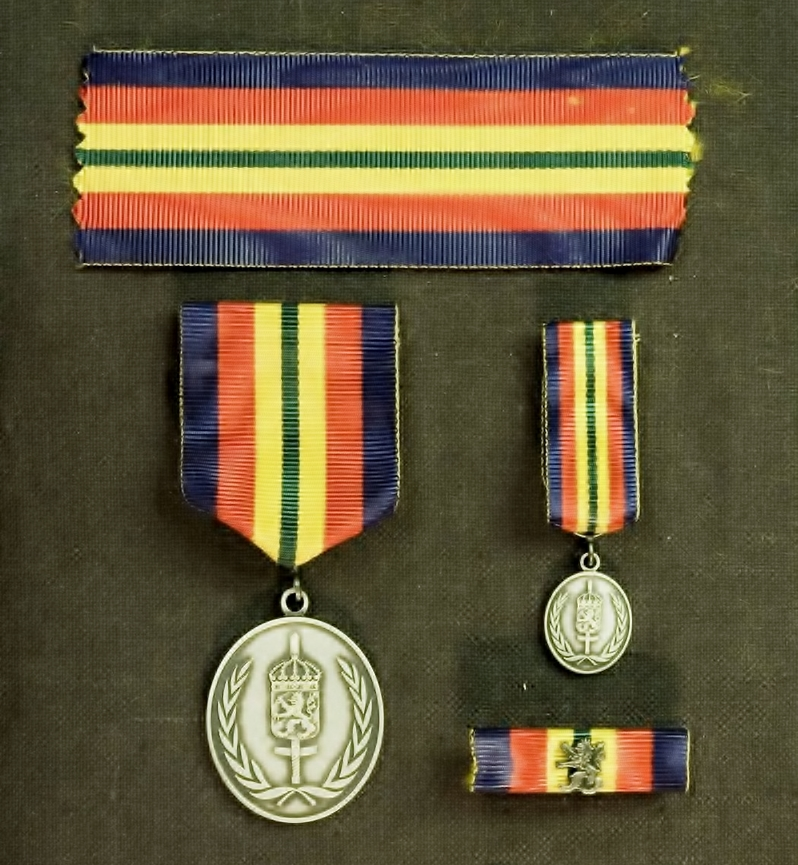
Commemorative medal in silver.

== Commanding officers ==
=== Military district commanders ===
- 2000–2004: Major general Paul Degerlund
- 2004–2005: Colonel Göran Boijsen

=== Chiefs of staff ===
- 2000–2003: Colonel Lennart Klevensparr
- 2003–2004: Colonel Göran Boijsen
- 2004–2005: Lieutenant colonel Hans Bengtsson

=== Deputy Chiefs of Staff ===
- 2001–2003: Commander Lennart Bengtsson
- 2004–2005: Lieutenant colonel Olavi Olson

== Names, designations and locations ==
Name	Translation	From		To
Södra militärdistriktet	Southern Military District	2000-07-01	–	2005-12-31
Avvecklingsorganisation	Decommissioning Organisation	2006-01-01	–	2006-06-30
Designation		From		To
MD S		2000-07-01	–	2005-12-31
Location		From		To
Gothenburg Garrison		2000-07-01	–	2006-06-30
