= Jonas Wikman =

Swedish Air Force officer (born 1972)

- Wikman in June 2026
- Born: Jonas Olof Wikman; 26 March 1972 (age 54); Härnösand, Sweden
- Military career
- Allegiance: Sweden
- Branch: Swedish Air Force
- Service years: 1994–present
- Rank: Major general
- Nickname: "Shaft" (call sign)
- Commands: Swedish Air Force Centre for Aviation Medicine; Chief of Procurement; Deputy Chief of Joint Operations; Chief of Air Force
- Conflicts: Resolute Support Mission (TAAC – Air)

Major General Olof Jonas Wikman (born 26 March 1972) is a Swedish Air Force officer. His senior commands include Assistant Chief of Armed Forces Training & Procurement/Chief of Procurement (2017–2021) and as Deputy Chief of Joint Operations (2021–2022). Wikman serves as Chief of Air Force from 14 December 2022.

== Early life ==
Wikman was born on 26 March 1972 in Säbrå Parish in Härnösand Municipality, Västernorrland County, Sweden. He did his military service at Jämtland Wing (F 4) in Östersund with training at the platoon leader school at Västgöta Wing (F 6) in Karlsborg. He underwent basic flight training in 1992 at the Swedish Air Force Flying School in Ljungbyhed.

== Career ==
Wikman was commissioned as an officer in the Swedish Air Force in 1994 and was appointed second lieutenant the same year. He was promoted to lieutenant in 1996. At the end of the 1990s, he served at the Scania Wing (F 10) in Ängelholm. He was then a flight instructor before he started flying the Saab 35 Draken. He belonged to the last group of people who flew Saab 35 Draken at F 10. While he continued as a pilot, he started in aviation medicine and worked, among other things, with g-forces, aerospace physiology and survival skills. Wikman served as acting head of the Swedish Air Force Centre for Aviation Medicine (Flygmedicincentrum, FMC) in Stockholm during 2005 and then as its regular head from 2005 until the units disbandment in 2006. He has subsequently been head of the Swedish Defence Materiel Administration's flight testing, T&E Luft, in Linköping.

The Swedish Armed Forces appointed Wikman at the disposal of the head of the Training & Procurement Staff (Produktionsstaben) at the Swedish Armed Forces Headquarters in Stockholm during September 2014. Afterwards, he was appointed as head of the Plans Department in the Training & Procurement Staff (Produktionsledningens planeringsavdelning, PROD PLAN) at the Swedish Armed Forces Headquarters from 1 October 2014. The Swedish Armed Forces appointed Wikman to the Chief of Joint Operations to serve as Lead Advisor (Kabul Air Advisory Group) at the NATO Air Command-Afghanistan/NATO Air Training Command-Afghanistan located in Kabul from 29 August 2016. He served there as head of the J5 function and senior advisor. His job was partly to be responsible for the planning of operations in Afghanistan, partly to be an adviser to the Afghan Air Force's head of planning.

Wikman was appointed Assistant Chief of Armed Forces Training & Procurement/Chief of Procurement in the Training & Procurement Staff at the Swedish Armed Forces Headquarters from 19 April 2017. He was promoted to brigadier general at the same time. Between 2 May 2017 and 1 December 2017, Wikman served as head of the implementation department of the Aurora 17 (FMÖ17) military exercise. In 2017, the Swedish Armed Forces nominated Wikman together with colonel Anna Siverstig, head of the Joint Support Staff's (Insatsstaben, INSS) CIMIC, Arms Control and Disarmament Department (Avdelningen för samverkan och rustningskontroll, INSS J9/J9 RUST), to be members of the Swedish Customs Service's transparency council. On 1 April 2021, Wikman was promoted to major general and assumed the position of Deputy Chief of Joint Operations. Wikman assumed the position of Chief of Air Force on 14 December 2022, succeeding Major General Carl-Johan Edström.

== Personal life ==
Wikman is married to Katarina and they have three children.

== Dates of rank ==
- 1994 – Second lieutenant
- 1996 – Lieutenant
- ? – Captain
- ? – Major
- ? – Lieutenant colonel
- ? – Colonel
- 19 April 2017 – Brigadier general
- 1 April 2021 – Major general

== Awards and decorations ==
=== Swedish ===
- (Sweden) For Zealous and Devoted Service of the Realm
- (Sweden) Swedish Armed Forces Conscript Medal
- (Sweden) Swedish Armed Forces International Service Medal
- (Sweden) Home Guard Silver Medal (21 March 2021)
- (Sweden) Home Guard Bronze Medal (June 2016)
- (Sweden) Swedish Volunteer Air Corps Medal of Merit (Frivilliga flygkårens förtjänstmedalj)
- (Sweden) Swedish Air Force Centre for Aviation Medicine Commemorative Medal (Flygmedicincentrums minnesmedalj, FMCMM)

=== Foreign ===
- (Germany) Badge of Honour of the Bundeswehr, Cross of Honour in gold (5 February 2025)
- NATO Non-Article 5 medal for Operation Resolute Support (2017)

Military offices
Preceded by Urban Molin	Deputy Chief of Joint Operations; 2021–2022	Succeeded by Fredrik Ståhlberg
Preceded by Carl-Johan Edström	Chief of Air Force; 2022–present	Succeeded by Incumbent
