= Berndt Grundevik =

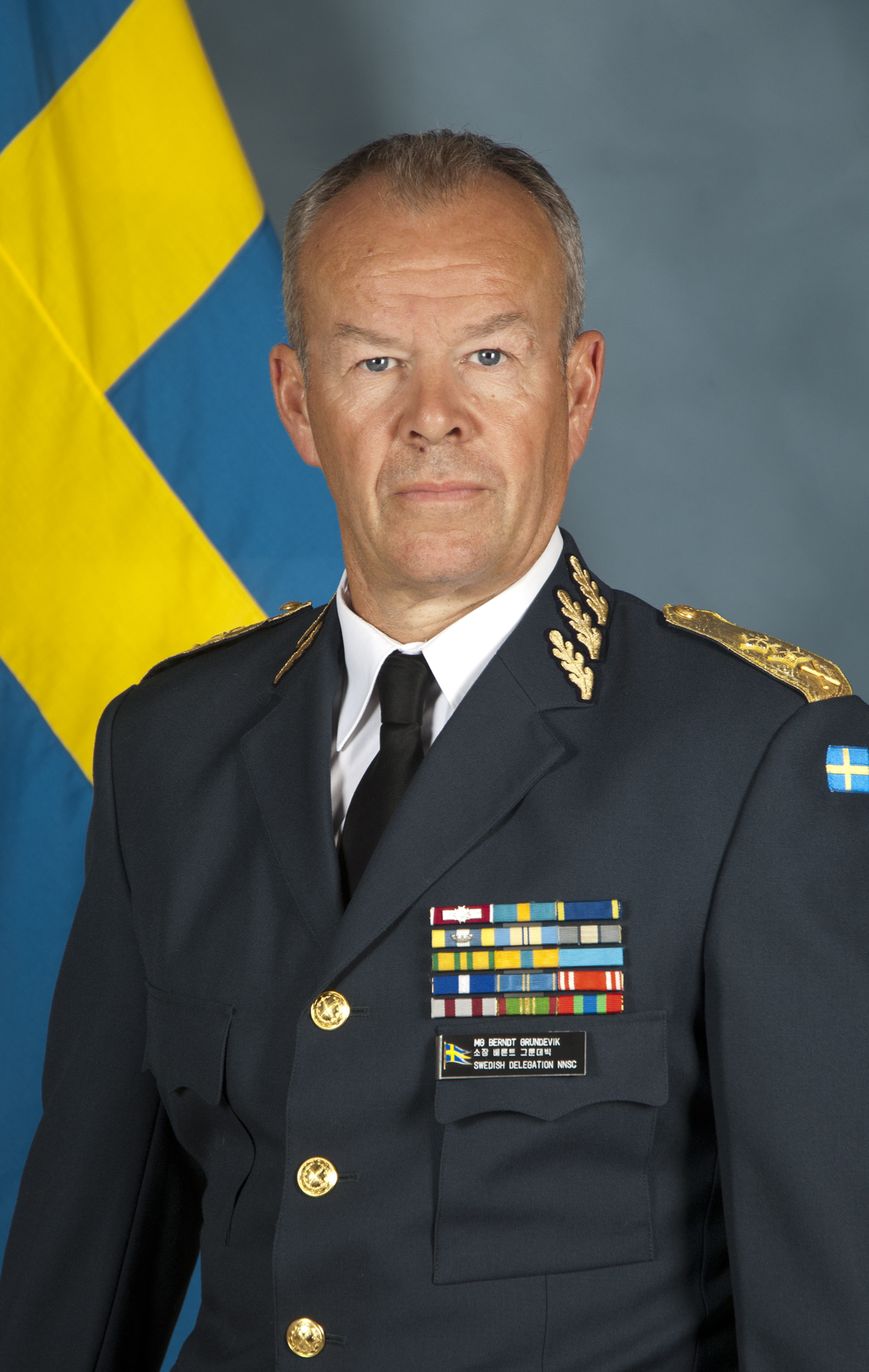
- Born: Berndt Karl Allan Grundevik; 5 November 1956 (age 69); Uddevalla, Sweden
- Military career
- Allegiance: Sweden
- Branch: Swedish Army
- Service years: 1979–2017
- Rank: Major General
- Units: I 17 (1976, 1979-80); UNEF II (1977); I 1 (1981-85); UNFICYP (1985-86); I 22 (1988-89) etc
- Commands: Life Regiment Hussars; Inspector of the Army; NNSC; Deputy Chief of Joint Operations

Major General Berndt Karl Allan Grundevik (born 5 November 1956) is senior retired Swedish Army officer. Grundevik served as Inspector of the Army (2007–2012), as head of the Swedish Delegation to the Neutral Nations Supervisory Commission (NNSC) in Korea (2013–2015) and as Deputy Chief of Joint Operations (2016–2017).

== Career ==
Grundevik started his military career as a conscript at Bohuslän Regiment (I 17) in Uddevalla in 1976. As a conscript squadleader, he served in the Sinai Peninsula during 1977, before starting his training to become a commissioned officer. Grundevik went reserve officer training from 1978 to 1979 and was deputy platoon leader for the anti-tank warfare platoon at Bohuslän Regiment from 1979 to 1980 and then attended the Royal Military Academy in Stockholm from 1980 to 1981. He was commissioned as a lieutenant in 1981 as rifle platoon commander at the Svea Life Guards (I 1), where he served as platoon commander until 1985. During this period, he was promoted to captain in 1983.

Grundevik served in the UN mission in Cyprus as a platoon commander from 1985 to 1986 and attended the staff course of the Swedish National Defence College from 1987 to 1988. After graduating from the Swedish National Defence College in 1988, he was commissioned as company commander at the Lapland Ranger Regiment (I 22), a position where he stayed for two years and was promoted to major in 1989, until heading south to the Infantry Combat School (Infanteriets stridskola) as an instructor from 1990 to 1992. From 1992 to 1994, Grundevik attended the advanced course of the Swedish National Defence College. After graduation, and now as a general staff officer, he served as ADC to the Chief of Army Staff, Lieutenant General Åke Sagrén for the following two years. Finishing the service in the Swedish Armed Forces Headquarters, he once again returned to the academic world, this time as a deputy course director at the Swedish National Defence College. As a newly promoted lieutenant colonel in 1997, he was assigned to the Life Guards Brigade (Livgardesbrigaden, MekIB 1) in Kungsängen as deputy commander.

In 1999, he was assigned to the Swedish National Defence College as course director for the advanced course. He was promoted to colonel in 2000, and between 2002 and 2005, he was assigned to be commanding officer at the Life Regiment Hussars (K 3) in Karlsborg. During this assignment, he also served as Senior Operations Officer/CJOC in NATO CJTF Staff in Istanbul, Turkey for a shorter period. After leaving the Life Regiments Hussars, he returned to the Swedish Armed Forces Headquarters as Chief of Planning, Plans and Policy in 2005 and was promoted to brigadier general. Grundevik attended the Senior Officers’ International Defence Management Course, and the Naval Postgraduate School in Monterey, California, United States in July 2006. In January 2007, he was assigned the position of Task Force Commander (COM MNTF C) in Kosovo for six months.

Grundevik was promoted to major general on 13 December 2007 shortly after being appointed Inspector of the Army and head of the Army Tactical Staff. He served in this position until 13 September 2012, when he assumed the position of Acting Deputy Chief of Joint Operations in the Swedish Armed Forces Headquarters in Stockholm. Between 27 September 2013 and 29 April 2015 he was head of the Swedish delegation to the Neutral Nations Supervisory Commission (NNSC) in Korea. Between 9 September and 31 December 2015 he was appointed as a special investigator in the Training & Procurement Staff in the Swedish Armed Forces Headquarters. On 1 June 2016, Grundevik was appointed Deputy Chief of Joint Operations. He retired in November 2017.

== Dates of rank ==
Dates of rank:

- 1979 – Reserve officer
- 1981 – Lieutenant
- 1983 – Captain
- 1989 – Major
- 1997 – Lieutenant colonel
- 2000 – Colonel
- 2005 – Brigadier general
- 2007 – Major general

== Awards and decorations ==
- (Sweden) Swedish Armed Forces Conscript Medal
- (Sweden) Swedish Armed Forces Reserve Officer Medal
- (Sweden) For Zealous and Devoted Service of the Realm
- (Sweden) Swedish Armed Forces International Service Medal
- (Sweden) Home Guard Silver Medal
- (Sweden) Commemorative Medal of the Nobel Prize to the UN Peacekeeping Forces (Medaljen till minne av Nobels fredspris till FNs fredsbevarande styrkor, NobelFNSMM)
- (Sweden) Air Defence Regiment (Lv 6) Medal of Merit (Luftvärnsregementets (Lv 6) förtjänstmedalj)
- (Sweden) Swedish Reserve Officers Federation Merit Badge (Förbundet Sveriges Reservofficerares förtjänsttecken)
- (Sweden) Swedish delegation to NNSC Medal (Koreamedaljen)
- (Sweden) Psychologic Defence Associations of the Total Defence Medal of Merit (Totalförsvarets psykförsvarsförbunds förtjänstmedalj, TfpsykfbGM/SM) (Criscom) (2010)

=== Foreign ===
- (United States) Commander of the Legion of Merit (2012 and 2015)
- (United States) Korea Defense Service Medal (2015)
- (South Korea) Order of National Security Merit, 3rd Grade (Cheonsu Medal) (2015)
- United Nations Medal (UNEF II), Israel
- United Nations Medal (UNFICYP), Cyprus
- NATO Non-Article 5 medal for the Balkans (2007)
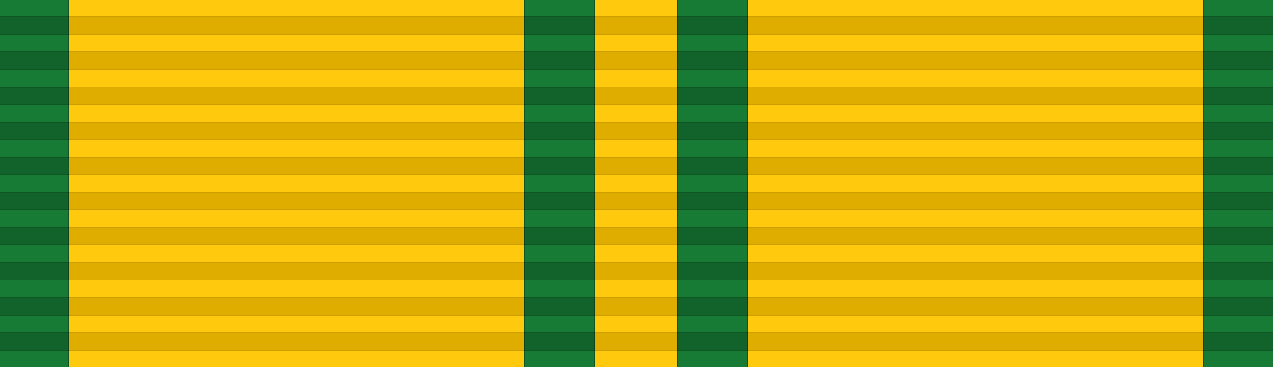
- (Netherlands) Cross for the Four Day Marches

== Honours ==
- Member of the Royal Swedish Academy of War Sciences (9 April 2007)
- Senior Fellow of New Westminster College, New Westminster, Canada

Military offices
Preceded by Sverker Göranson	Inspector of the Army; 2007–2012	Succeeded by Anders Brännström
Preceded by Anders Grenstad	Head of Swedish Delegation to NNSC; 2013–2015	Succeeded by Mats Engman
Preceded by Anders Grenstad	Deputy Chief of Joint Operations; 2016–2017	Succeeded by Urban Molin
