= Degerlund =

Degerlund is a surname. Notable people with the surname include:

- Marcus Degerlund (born 1998), Swedish footballer
- Paul Degerlund (born 1948), Swedish Army major general
- Rolf Degerlund (born 1952), Swedish actor
