= Eksell =

Eksell is a Swedish surname. Notable people with the surname include:

- Klas Eksell (born 1960), Swedish military officer
- Olle Eksell (1918–2007), Swedish graphic designer and poster artist
