= Anders Lindström (Swedish Army officer) =

Swedish lieutenant-general

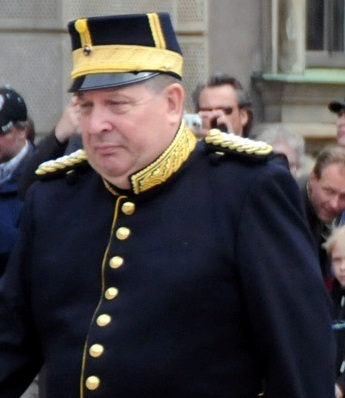
- Lindström as Commandant General in Stockholm.
- Born: Anders Reinhold Lindström; 14 January 1955 (age 71); Borås, Sweden
- Military career
- Allegiance: Sweden
- Branch: Swedish Army
- Service years: 1976–2011
- Rank: Lieutenant General
- Commands: Dalarna Brigade; Deputy Inspector General of the Army; Chief of Home Guard; Chief of Joint Operations; Commandant General in Stockholm
- Other work: CEO of Storstockholms Lokaltrafik

Lieutenant General Anders Reinhold Lindström (14 January 1955) is a retired Swedish Army officer. His senior commands include the Chief of Home Guard, the Chief of Joint Operations and the Commandant General in Stockholm. He retired from the military in 2011.

== Early life ==
Lindström was born on 14 January 1955 in Borås, Sweden. His father, who came from Ådalen, started as a tailor apprentice and became designer in women's clothing. Lindström's mother came from a free church baptist family. He grew up in Borås, Västerås, Nässjö, and Halmstad and started school one year before his peers. Lindström graduated from Rudbeckianska gymnasiet in Västerås in 1971 and as a youth he became Swedish junior champion in bandy.

== Career ==
=== Military career ===
Lindström was commissioned into the Swedish Army in 1976 and he served as an officer in Göta Life Guards (P 1). Lindström also served many years in different positions in Södermanland Regiment (P 10) in Strängnäs. Lindström served in different staff positions before he became deputy brigade commander of the Life Grenadier Brigade (IB 4) in Linköping and then he served as commanding officer of Dalarna Brigade (NB 13) in Falun from 1997 to 1999 and in the staff of Middle Military District (Milo M).

Lindström then served as Deputy Inspector General of the Army from 2000 to 2002 and deputy commanding officer of the Army Tactical Command. He has also served as liaison officer at the United States Central Command in Tampa, Florida from March 2002. On 1 October 2002, Lindström was appointed Chief of Home Guard and was promoted to major general. On 13 December 2007, Lindström was appointed Chief of Joint Operations and head of the Joint Forces Command in the Swedish Armed Forces Headquarters in Stockholm. He was at the same time promoted to lieutenant general.

=== Business career ===
On 11 October 2011, Lindström was appointed CEO of AB Storstockholms Lokaltrafik (SL) and Waxholmsbolaget as well as the managing director of the Traffic Board (Trafiknämnden). He took office on 1 January 2012. In June 2014, Lindström was elected chairman of the Swedish Federation for Voluntary Defence Education and Training and he left the same position a year later. In May 2015, Lindström was fined 5,000 Hong Kong dollar by the Tsuen Wan Magistrates' Court in Hong Kong for having stolen a cardholder at Hong Kong International Airport during a business trip. Lindström himself claimed that he accidentally forgot to pay for it. In connection with this, he departed from his service, and resigned the same month as CEO of SL and Waxholmsbolaget. Since June 2015, Lindström works as a Senior Consultant for Count On Business Service AB.

== Personal life ==
Lindström was married to Ann-Christine who died in May 2004. They had one son, Anders Junior. He later married his present wife Katharina and they have three children.

== Dates of rank ==
- 19?? – Second lieutenant
- 19?? – Lieutenant
- 19?? – Captain
- 19?? – Major
- 19?? – Lieutenant Colonel
- 19?? – Colonel
- 2000 – Brigadier general
- 2002 – Major general
- 2007 – Lieutenant general

== Awards and decorations ==
=== Swedish ===
- (Sweden) For Zealous and Devoted Service of the Realm
- (Sweden) Home Guard Medal of Merit
- (Sweden) Swedish Women's Voluntary Defence Organization Royal Medal of Merit
- (Sweden) Swedish Armed Forces Conscript Medal
- (Sweden) Swedish Armed Forces International Service Medal
- (Sweden) Association of Home Guard Officers Merit Badge
- (Sweden) Dala Brigade Medal of Merit (Dalabrigadens förtjänstmedalj)
- (Sweden) Home Guard Petri Medal
- (Sweden) Dalarna Regiment and Dalarna Brigade Commemorative Medal in silver (Dalregementets och Dalabrigadens minnesmedalj i silver, DalregbrigSMM)
- (Sweden) Central Military District Commemorative Medal (Mellersta militärdistriktets minnesmedalj, MDMMSM)
- (Sweden) Eastern Army Division Commemorative Medal (Östra arméfördelningens minnesmedalj, ÖFördSMM)
- (Sweden) Järnvägarnas driftvärn Commemorative Medal in silver (Järnvägarnas driftvärns minnesmedalj i silver, JvgDvMSM)
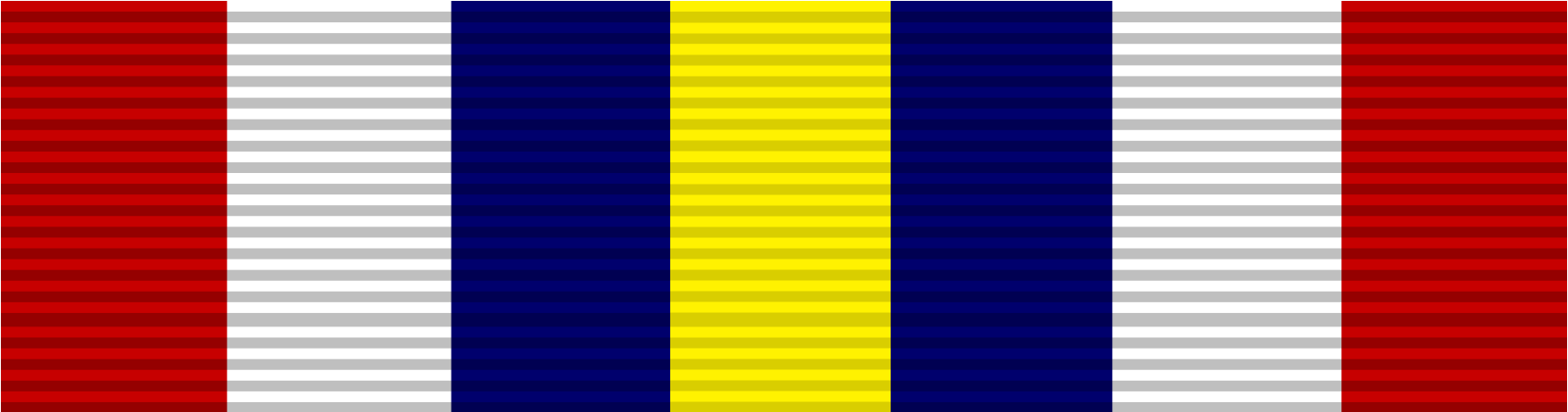
- (Sweden) The Nordic Blue Beret Medal of Merit (Blå barettförtjänstmedaljen, BbarettBM)
- etc

=== Foreign ===
- (Denmark) Home Guard Badge of Merit (Hjemmevaernets fortjensttegn)
- etc

Military offices
Preceded by Lennart Rönnberg	Chief of Staff of the Middle Military District; 1995–1997	Succeeded by Kjell Koserius
Preceded by Olle Nilsson as Acting	Dalarna Brigade; 1997–1999	Succeeded by Rutger Simonsson
Preceded by Einar Jonasson	Deputy Inspector General of the Army; 2000–2002	Succeeded by None
Preceded by Mats Welff	Chief of Home Guard; 2002–2005	Succeeded by Roland Ekenberg
Preceded by Jan Jonsson	Chief of Joint Operations; 2007–2011	Succeeded by Jan Salestrand
Preceded by Jan Jonsson	Commandant General in Stockholm; 2008–2011	Succeeded by Jan Salestrand
Business positions
Preceded by Göran Gunnarsson	CEO of Storstockholms Lokaltrafik; 2012–2015	Succeeded by Caroline Ottosson
