= Anders Brännström =

Swedish major-general and commander of the army

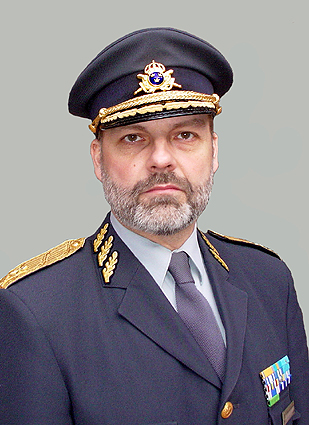
- Brännström in 2008.
- Born: Anders Karl Oskar Brännström; 28 February 1957 (age 69); Hancock, Michigan, USA
- Military career
- Allegiance: Sweden
- Branch: Swedish Army
- Service years: 1979–2018
- Rank: Major General
- Commands: Jämtland Ranger Regiment; Deputy Chief of Joint Operations; Chief of Army
- Conflicts: Kosovo War; War in Afghanistan; 2004 Kosovo unrest

Major General Anders Karl Oskar Brännström (born 28 February 1957) is a retired Swedish Army officer. He has served in Cyprus, Kosovo and Afghanistan and been commanding officer of Jämtland Ranger Regiment. Brännström's senior appointments include Deputy Chief of Joint Operations from 2008 to 2012 and Chief of Army from 2013 to 2016. He served as head of Exercise Viking 2018 and then as head of the Total Defence Department of the Joint Staff until 26 January 2018 when he was fired from the position due to critical statements about Sweden's lack of defense ability.

== Early life ==
Brännström was born on 28 February 1957 in Hancock, Michigan, USA, the son of Olaus Brännström, a vicar, and his wife Ingrid (née Karlsson). He has two sisters, Kristina (born 1946) and Maria (born 1948). At the time of his birth, his father was a visiting professor at the Suomi College and Theological Seminary in Hancock, Michigan. Brännström's time in the United States was brief as the family returned to Sweden four months after his birth, to Tärendö, where his father had been a vicar since 1951. For five years, he lived in the manse in Tärendö before his father took the position as vicar in Burträsk in 1962. The Brännström family stayed in Burträsk until 1966 before they moved north again. The new address became Nygatan 12 in Luleå where his father got a new job as dean and later bishop in the Diocese of Luleå until 1986. It was in Luleå that Brännström started his military career. At the age of 15, he became a Home Guard soldier.

== Career ==
He received his commission as an officer on 28 September 1979, after studies at the Royal Military Academy in Stockholm. The same year he was assigned to Norrbotten Armoured Battalion (I 19/P 5), part of Norrbotten Regiment in Boden, which would become his home regiment for 19 years. In 1981 Brännström underwent the command course of the Swedish Army Paratroop School, and during the 1982–1983 he served as a platoon leader in the Swedish Battalion 81 C in Cyprus which was part of the United Nations Peacekeeping Force in Cyprus (UNFICYP). He was commanding officer of the Ground Operational Section (Markoperativa sektionen) within the Upper Norrland Military District/Northern Military District from 1992 to 1995 and of the Jämtland Ranger Regiment (I 5) in Östersund from 1998 to 2003. From April until October 2000, Brännström was commanding officer of the Swedish Battalion (SWEBAT) and head of the Swedish contingent in the Kosovo Force in Kosovo. After leaving I 5 in Östersund in 2003, Brännström became commanding officer of the Multinational Brigade Centre in Kosovo for a year before being appointed head of the Army Tactical Command in Uppsala in 2004.

On 17 March 2004 Brännström was brigade commander of the international peace force in Kosovo - in the midst of a conflict between Kosovo Albanians and Kosovo Serbs. This day reports were received that thousands of Kosovo Albanians were on the verge of wiping out the village of Čaglavica, south of Pristina, with its 1,200 inhabitants. Brännström decided to stop the attackers and within a few hours over 1,000 soldiers from the international peace force were in place to defend the village. The conflict had been going on for a long while, and the Kosovo Serbs had previously tried to kill Kosovo Albanians in a number of villages. But what appeared in Čaglavica was worse than before. Two raised crowds threw stones against each other with the soldiers between themselves. There were iron pipes and firearms. The unrest continued all day and did not calm down until late in the evening when the lynch mob pulled back. A number of people from the crowds died. Brännström's brigade, which included the Swedish contingent KS09, was the only unit whose conduct was subsequently approved of by external observers in the International Crisis Group.

In 2007, Brännström became acting head of the Army Tactical Staff in Stockholm. He then served as the Deputy Chief of Joint Operations from 2008 to 2012 when he on the 13 September 2012 was appointed Inspector of the Army. This position was in 2013 name changed to Chief of Army. On 1 June 2016 Brännström left the position as Chief of Army due to the frustration of the lack of opportunities to do a good job. He was replaced by major general Karl Engelbrektson and Brännström was instead appointed head of the Exercise Viking 2018. From the beginning of January 2018, Brännström headed the new Total Defence Department of the Defence Staff until he was fired on 26 January by Supreme Commander, General Micael Bydén. The reason why Brännström was removed was, according to Bydén, "a matter of confidence." Brännström had made critical statements about Sweden's lack of defense ability.

== Personal life ==
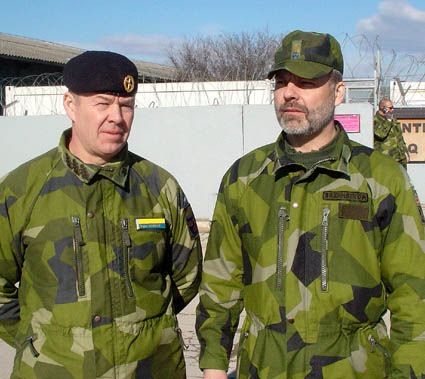
Brännström (right) with major general Berndt Grundevik in 2008.

Brännström is married to Christin and they have three children.

== Dates of rank ==
- 1979 – Lieutenant
- 1982 – Captain
- 1986 – Major
- 1995 – Lieutenant colonel
- 1998 – Colonel
- 2003 – Brigadier general
- 2008 – Major general

== Awards and decorations ==
=== Swedish ===
- (Sweden) For Zealous and Devoted Service of the Realm
- (Sweden) Royal Swedish Academy of War Sciences Medal of Reward in gold (Kungl. Krigsvetenskapsakademiens belöningsmedalj i guld)
- (Sweden) Swedish Armed Forces Conscript Medal
- (Sweden) Swedish Armed Forces International Service Medal
- (Sweden) Northern Military District Staff Commemorative Medal in silver (Norra militärområdesstabens minnesmedalj i silver, MiloNMSM)
- (Sweden) Jämtland Ranger Regiment and Östersund Garrison Commemorative Medal in silver (Jämtlands fältjägarremente och Östersunds garnisons minnesmedalj i silver, JämtfältjägregMSM)
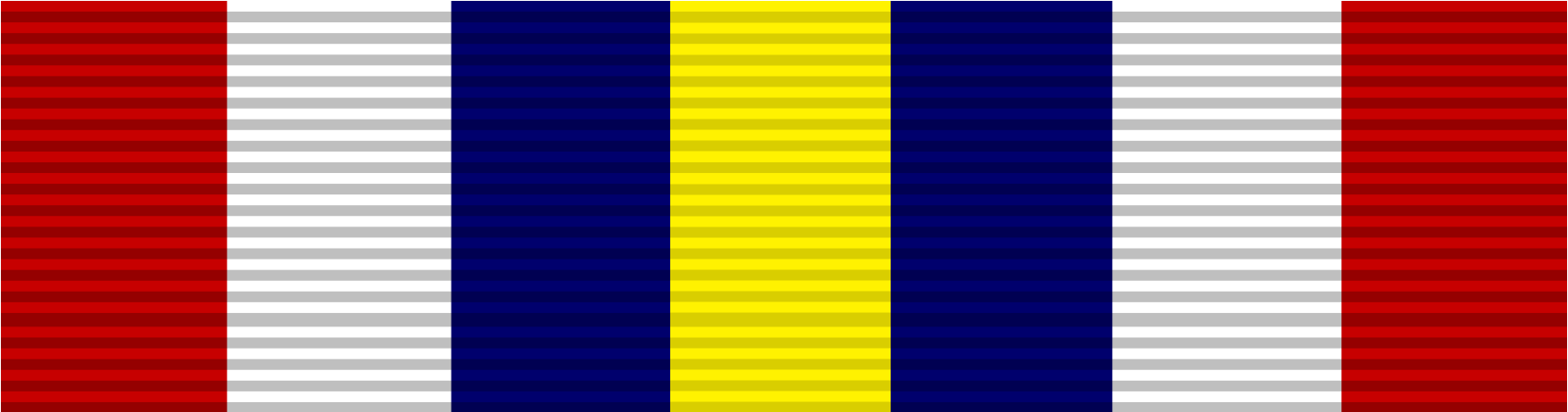
- (Sweden) The Nordic Blue Beret Medal of Merit (Blå barettförtjänstmedaljen, BbarettBM)
- (Sweden) Commemorative Medal of the Nobel Prize to the UN Peacekeeping Forces (Medaljen till minne av Nobels fredspris till FNs fredsbevarande styrkor, NobelFNSMM)
- (Sweden) Swedish Reserve Officers Federation Merit Badge (Förbundet Sveriges Reservofficerares förtjänsttecken)

=== Foreign ===
- United Nations Medal (UNFICYP, Cyprus)
- NATO Meritorious Service Medal
- NATO Medal for Kosovo (KFOR)
- NATO Non-Article 5 medal for the Balkans
- (Italy) Order of Saints Maurice and Lazarus

== Courses ==
Brännström's courses:

- Reserve Components National Security Course (National Defense University, Arlington, Virginia, USA)
- Partnership for Peace Staff Officers Course (SWEDINT, Almnäs, Sweden)
- International Commanding Officers Course (Armed Forces International Centre, Sessvollmoen, Norway)
- Integrated PfP OSCE Course (NATO Defense College, Rome, Italy)
- Advanced Management Course (Swedish Institute of Management, Sigtuna, Sweden)

== Honours ==
- Vice chairman of the Swedish Association for Christian Officers
- Member of the Royal Swedish Academy of War Sciences
- Honorary member of Norrlands nation
- [Swedish] Peacekeeper of the Year (2005)

Military offices
Preceded by Bengt Andersson	Deputy Chief of Joint Operations; 2008–2012	Succeeded by Berndt Grundevik
Preceded by Berndt Grundevik	Chief of Army; 2012–2016	Succeeded by Karl Engelbrektson
