= Klas Eksell =

Retired Swedish Army officer

- Born: Klas Carl Gunnar Eksell; 6 October 1960 (age 66); Eksjö, Sweden
- Military career
- Allegiance: Sweden
- Branch: Swedish Army
- Service years: 1982–2022
- Rank: Major General
- Unit: Bohuslän Regiment (1982–1991)
- Commands: Land Warfare Centre; Security Office, MUST; Deputy Director of Human Resource; Director of Human Resource
- Conflicts: War in Afghanistan; Cyprus dispute

Major General Klas Carl Gunnar Eksell (born 6 October 1960) is a retired Swedish Army officer. He served as the Director of Human Resource at the Swedish Armed Forces Headquarters from 2016 to 2022.

== Early life ==
Eksell was born on 6 October 1960 in Eksjö Parish, Sweden, and grew up in Uddevalla. He did his military service in Bohuslän Regiment (I 17) and became an officer aspirant in 1978.

== Career ==
Eksell attended the Military Academy Karlberg from 1980 to 1982 when he was commissioned as an officer. Eksell attended the Swedish Armed Forces Staff College's General Course from 1988 to 1989 and the higher course from 1993 to 1995. In 1995, Eksell became staff officer at the Swedish National Defence College and in 1996 he served as a staff officer in the Human Resources Staff (Personalstaben, PERSS) at the Swedish Armed Forces Headquarters in Stockholm. From 1997 to 1999, Eksell was head of Brigade Development at the Swedish Armed Forces Headquarters. In 2000, Eksell served as head of training of the Baltic Battalion Training Team in Latvia. He was then assigned as Course Director of the Swedish National Defence College's Advanced Staff Course from 2001 to 2003 and as brigade commander in Norrbotten Regiment (I 19) from 2003 to 2005.

In 2005, Eksell was promoted to colonel as appointed Chief Operating Officer at the Swedish Military Intelligence and Security Service. Two years later, he was appointed commanding officer of the Land Warfare Centre in Skövde. He held that position for three years and in 2011 Eksell served as Senior Mentor to the 1st Brigade, Afghan National Army in the RC North, as part of the Operational Mentoring and Liaison Team 1 (OMLT 1). Eksell was appointed head of the Security Office (Säkerhetskontoret) at the Swedish Military Intelligence and Security Service in 2012. In 2013, Eksell was promoted to brigadier general and served as Deputy Director of Human Resource at the Swedish Armed Forces Headquarters from 1 January 2013 to 31 October 2016. From 1 July 2016 to 31 October 2016, Eksell served as Acting Director of Human Resource. Eksell was promoted to major general and took office as Director of Human Resource on 1 November 2016. He was succeeded by Kim-Lena Ekvall Svedenblad on 1 January 2023.

== Personal life ==
Eksell is married to Elisabeth with whom he has two children. He lives in Strängnäs.

== Dates of rank ==
- 19?? – Second lieutenant
- 1982 – Lieutenant
- 1983 – Captain
- 19?? – Major
- 20?? – Lieutenant colonel
- 2005 – Colonel
- 2013 – Brigadier general
- 2016 – Major general

== Awards and decorations ==
=== Swedish ===
- (Sweden) Swedish Armed Forces Conscript Medal
- (Sweden) Swedish Armed Forces International Service Medal (2000 and 2010)
- (Sweden) Land Warfare Centre Medal of Merit (Markstridsskolans förtjänstmedalj)
- (Sweden) Småland Brigade Commemorative Medal (Smålandsbrigadens minnesmedalj)
- (Sweden) Dala Brigade Medal of Merit (Dalabrigadens förtjänstmedalj)
- (Sweden) Norrland Artillery Battalion Commemorative Medal (Norrlands artilleribataljons minnesmedalj)
- (Sweden) Norrland Signal Battalion Commemorative Medal (Norrlands signalbataljons minnesmedalj)
- (Sweden) Commemorative Medal of the Nobel Prize to the UN Peacekeeping Forces (Medaljen till minne av Nobels fredspris till FNs fredsbevarande styrkor, NobelFNSMM) (1988)
- (Sweden) 1st Army Division Commemorative Medal (1.fördelningen minnesmedalj)

=== Foreign ===
- United Nations Medal (UNFICYP), Cyprus
- NATO Non-Article 5 medal for ISAF (2010)
- (Latvia) Latvian Defense Chief of Medal Merit (2010)

Military offices
Preceded by Michael Nilsson as Acting	Land Warfare Centre; 2007–2010	Succeeded by Michael Claesson
Preceded by Per-Olof Stålesjö	Director of Human Resource; 2016–2022	Succeeded by Kim-Lena Ekvall Svedenblad
