= Johan Kihl =

- Born: Lars Johan Kihl; 14 January 1946 (age 80); Kristinehamn, Sweden
- Military career
- Allegiance: Sweden
- Branch: Swedish Army
- Service years: 1969–2004
- Rank: Lieutenant General
- Commands: Norrland Dragoon Regiment; Swedish Armed Forces Special Forces; Strategic Plans and Policy Directorate; Swedish Armed Forces Headquarters
- Conflicts: Cyprus dispute

Lieutenant General Lars Johan Kihl (born 14 January 1946) is a retired Swedish Army officer. Kihl has served in positions like commanding officer of Norrland Dragoon Regiment (K 4) from 1992 to 1996, as head of the Strategic Plans and Policy Directorate from 2000 to 2004, as head of the Swedish Armed Forces Special Forces from 2000 to 2004 and as head of the Swedish Armed Forces Headquarters from 2002 to 2004.

== Early life ==
Kihl became a certified upper secondary school engineer in 1965 before graduating from the Royal Military Academy in 1969.

== Career ==
Kihl was commissioned as an officer in 1969 and was assigned as a second lieutenant to Västerbotten Regiment (I 20) in Umeå the same year. In 1970 Kihl came to Norrland's Dragoons (K 4) in Umeå and two years later he became captain in the Royal Life Guards Squadron (K 1). Kihl then served as company commander in Norrland's Dragoons (K 4) from 1973 to 1977/78 when he came to the Life Guard Dragoons (K 1). He also served in the British Army of the Rhine in 1974. Kihl attended the Swedish Armed Forces Staff College from 1978 to 1980 where he received its jeton "for particularly good study results" and received a scholarship from the Hammarskiöld-Risellschöldska Scholarship Fund (Hammarskiöld-Risellschöldska stipendiefonden). He then served as a staff officer from 1980 to 1987 in the Defence Staff and the Army Staff, mainly responsible for planning issues. He also served in the Swedish UN Battalion of the United Nations Peacekeeping Force in Cyprus (UNFICYP) in Cyprus in 1984.

Kihl was promoted to lieutenant colonel in 1985 and attended Harvard University in the United States from 1987 to 1988 and was then battalion/brigade commander in the Life Regiment Grenadiers (I 3) in Örebro from 1988 to 1990. He was promoted to colonel in 1990 and served as section chief in the Defence Staff's Planning Department before being appointed commanding officer of Norrland Dragoon Regiment (K 4) in Arvidsjaur in 1992. Kihl served there until 1996 when he was promoted to brigadier and appointed head of the Long-term Planning Department at the Swedish Armed Forces Headquarters. In 1998 he was promoted to major general and was appointed Deputy Director General of Joint Forces Directorate (Krigsförbandsledningen) at the Swedish Armed Forces Headquarters, a position he held until July 2000 when he was appointed head of the Strategic Plans and Policy Directorate (Strategiledningen) at the Swedish Armed Forces Headquarters and promoted to lieutenant general. Kihl was then head of the Swedish Armed Forces Headquarters from 2002 to 2004 when he retired.

He has also been a military expert in the Defense Committee and has largely been associated with visions of network-based defense. Kihl became a member of the Royal Swedish Academy of War Sciences in 1995. After retiring, Kihl became senior adviser to Ericsson Microwave Systems (since 2004) and SAAB Systems (since 2007). He is also chairman of the board of Modul 1 Data and board member of 4C Strategy and Countermine Technologies AB.

== Dates of rank ==
- 1969 – Second lieutenant
- 1971 – Lieutenant
- 1972 – Captain
- 1980 – Major
- 1985 – Lieutenant colonel
- 1990 – Colonel
- 1996 – Senior colonel
- 1998 – Major general
- 2000 – Lieutenant general

Military offices
| Preceded by Mertil Melin | Norrland Dragoon Regiment; 1992–1996 | Succeeded by Frank Westman |
| Preceded by None | Swedish Armed Forces Special Forces; 2000–2004 | Succeeded by Jörgen Ericsson |
| Preceded by None | Strategic Plans and Policy Directorate; 2000–2004 | Succeeded by Claes-Göran Fant |
| Preceded by None¹ | Swedish Armed Forces Headquarters; 2002–2004 | Succeeded by Claes-Göran Fant |
Notes and references
1. The position of head of the Swedish Armed Forces Headquarters (Chef för Högkvarteret) was established in 2002.
