= Paul Degerlund =

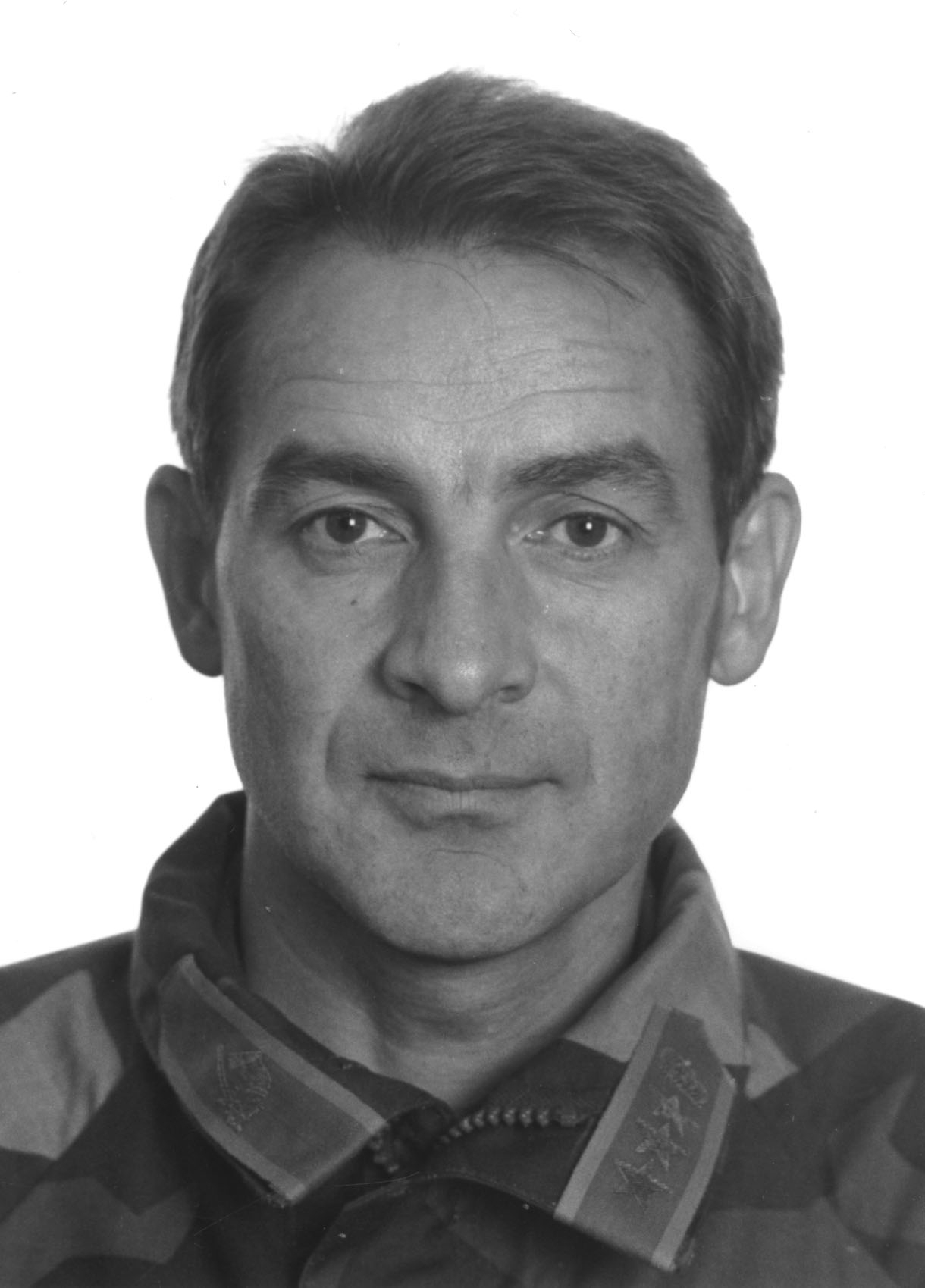
- Degerlund as colonel in the mid-1990s.
- Born: Fritz Erling Paul Degerlund; 16 December 1948 (age 77); Överstbyn, Sweden
- Military career
- Allegiance: Sweden
- Branch: Swedish Army
- Service years: 1974–2004
- Rank: Major General
- Commands: Halland Brigade; Combat School South; Inspector General of the Army; Southern Military District

Major General Fritz Erling Paul Degerlund (born 16 December 1948) is a retired Swedish Army officer. Degerlund's senior commands include Inspector General of the Swedish Army and commanding officer of the Southern Military District.

== Career ==
=== Military career ===
Degerlund was born in Överstbyn, Boden Municipality, Sweden. He graduated as an engineer in 1971 and then attended the Royal Military Academy from 1973 to 1974. Degerlund was trained in the air defense service and served in the Luleå Anti-Aircraft Regiment (Lv 7) in Luleå. He underwent traditional general staff training and got 1987–1988 the privilege to be a student at the United States Army Command and General Staff College at Fort Leavenworth in the United States. Degerlund has, among other things, been a teacher at the Swedish Armed Forces Staff College and was head of the Army Staff's Planning Department. He was commanding officer of the Halland Brigade (Hallandsbrigaden, IB 16) from 1993 to 1995 and then commanding officer of the Combat School South (Stridsskola Syd, SSS) from 1995 to 1997.

Degerlund was an expert in the 1997 Parliamentary Conscript Training Committee and in charge of conscription issue at the Swedish Armed Forces Headquarters until 1998 when he was promoted to major general and appointed to the position of Inspector General of the Army and head of the Army Tactical Center in Enköping. Degerlund was then commanding officer of the Southern Military District from 1 July 2000 to 30 June 2004 when he retired from active service and was appointed reserve officer in the Swedish Armed Forces from 1 July 2004.

=== Business career ===
Degerlund was working in the industry from 2004 and 2009 and was then a member of the by Swedish government appointed Signals Intelligence Committee (Signalspaningskommittén) from 2009 to 2011. He is CEO of the Emirates Advanced Investment Group’s branch in Sweden and has worked as head of marketing and senior military advisor for BAE Systems Hägglunds, and as an advisor to Midroc International AB. Degerlund was director of the board of the personal security service company GWS Production AB from 2014 to 27 June 2017. He was also CEO of SBBS Solutions AB and sat on the board of directors of ISD Technologies AB.

== Personal life ==
Degerlund is married to Eva Andersson, a hearing pedagogue. He has two children, Sofie and Peter.

== Dates of rank ==
- 1974 – Second lieutenant
- 1976 – Lieutenant
- 1977 – Captain
- 1983 – Major
- 1990 – Lieutenant colonel
- 1994 – Colonel
- 1997 – Senior colonel
- 1 July 1998 – Major general

== Honours ==
- Member of the Royal Swedish Academy of War Sciences (1992)

Military offices
Preceded by Mertil Melin	Inspector General of the Army; 1998–2000	Succeeded by Alf Sandqvist
Preceded by None	Southern Military District; 2000–2004	Succeeded by Göran Boijsen
