= Chief of Joint Operations (Sweden) =

Swedish Military Rank

- Chefen för operationsledningen
- Command flag

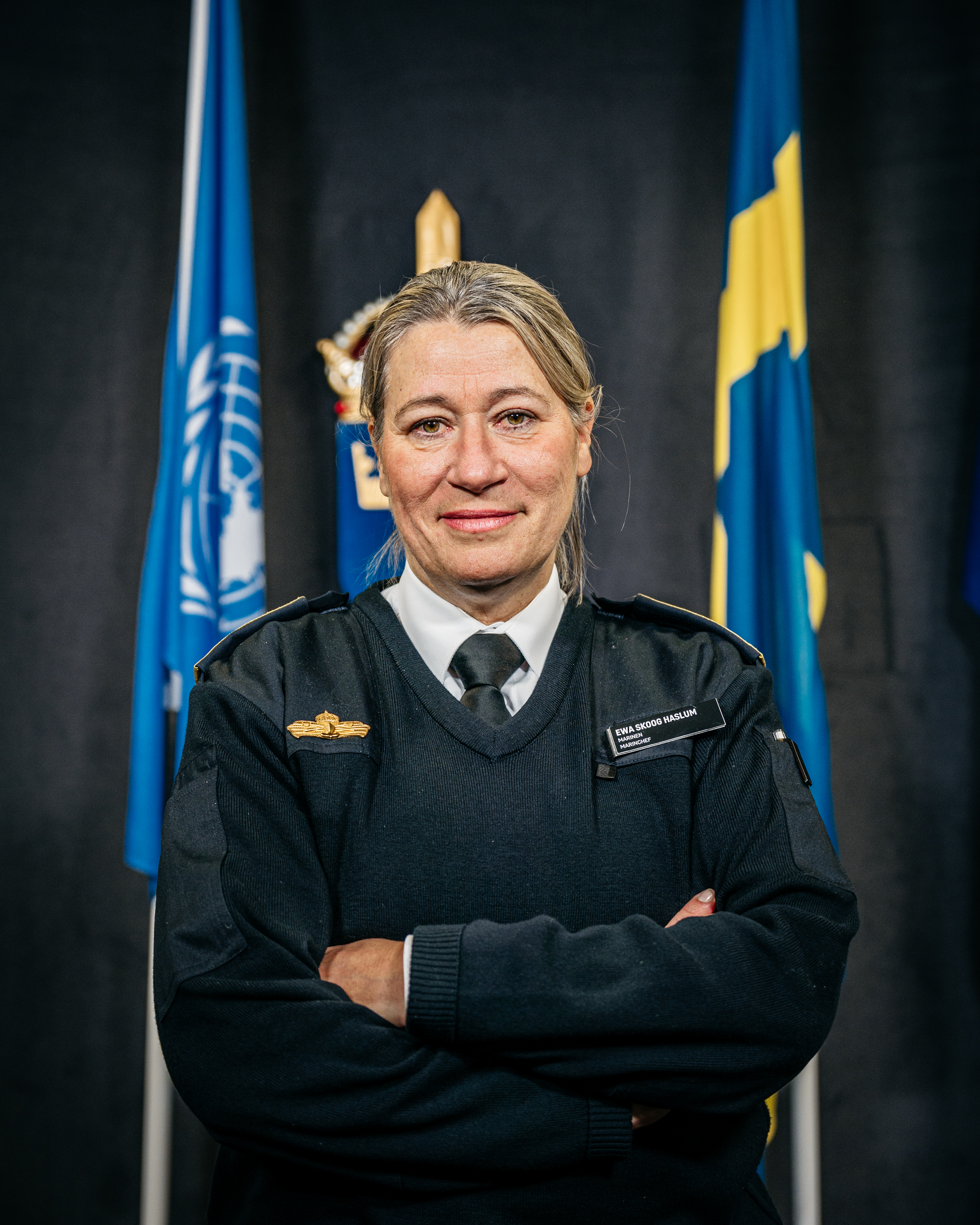
- Incumbent; VAdm Ewa Skoog Haslum since 15 November 2024
- Swedish Armed Forces
- Type: Chief of the Joint Forces Command
- Abbreviation: C OPL
- Member of: Defence Board
- Reports to: Chief of Defence
- Seat: Swedish Armed Forces Headquarters, Lidingövägen 24, Stockholm
- Term length: No fixed term
- Constituting instrument: FFS 2007:4, Chapter 4 FFS 2013:4, Chapter 10; FFS 2016:2, Chapter 10; FIB 2020:5, Chapter 10; FIB 2022:6, Chapter 20
- Precursor: Chief of the Joint Forces Command
- Formation: 1 April 2007
- First holder: Lieutenant General Jan Jonsson
- Unofficial names: chefen för insatsledningen, insatschefen (2007–2022)
- Deputy: Deputy Chief of Joint Operations (DCJO)

The Chief of Joint Operations (CJO) (Swedish: chefen för operationsledningen, C OPL (Note: Between 2007 and 2022, the name in Swedish was chefen för insats (C INSATS), and sometimes insatschefen or chefen för insatsledningen (C INS).)) is a three-star role within the Swedish Armed Forces, responsible the Joint Forces Command (JFC). The Chief of Joint Operations is subordinate to the Chief of Defence and is responsible, among other duties, for operations to defend Sweden against armed attacks, as well as for operations to uphold Sweden's territorial integrity and protect Swedish interests.

== Organisation ==
At the Swedish Armed Forces Headquarters' reorganization on 1 April 2007, the Joint Forces Command (JFC) (Insatsledningen, INS) (Note: Not to be confused with the Joint Forces Command which existed from 2000 to 2005.) was created. It commands the Swedish Armed Forces' missions on behalf of the Supreme Commander. Its assignment is to plan, command and follow up missions, both in Sweden and abroad. The Joint Forces Command is responsible for the Swedish Armed Forces' missions. This may involve, for example, international peacekeeping or peace enforcement missions, or detecting and rejecting aircraft or vessels that violate Swedish territory. The Joint Forces Command uses intelligence from the Swedish Military Intelligence and Security Service, to make their decisions. The Chief of Joint Operations reports directly to the Supreme Commander. Sorting under the Chief of Joint Operations are a number of commanders with different responsibilities. The tasks of the commanders are, among other things, to command, plan and follow up missions and to support the Swedish society. War units are military units that are prepared to carry out operations and which are part of any of the Swedish Armed Forces' units, schools or centers. Responsibility is divided between the tactical commanders, the ground, naval and air forces, as well as the head of the Special Forces Command (SFL).

On 1 January 2023, the Headquarters' new command organization came into force. Organizationally, this means that the Training & Procurement Staff and the Defence Staff were merged and form the new Defence Staff. At the same time as the Defence Staff was introduced, the Insatsledningen changes its name to the Operationsledningen.

== Tasks ==
The Chief of Joint Operations is subordinate to the Chief of Defence and, since 2013, has been responsible for the following three main areas:

1. Operations to defend Sweden against armed attacks, as well as operations to uphold Sweden’s territorial integrity and protect Swedish interests.
2. International missions.
3. Territorial activities.

There are specific regulations for operations involving special forces, the national intelligence unit, and cyber defence units

== Heraldry ==
The command flag of the Chief of Joint Operations was previously used by the Chief of the Joint Forces Command. The command flag is drawn by Kristina Holmgård-Åkerberg and embroidered by hand in insertion technique by MajBritt Salander/Blå Kusten company. Blazon: "Fessed in blue and yellow; on blue, three yellow open crowns placed two and one, on yellow a blue sword sinister and a blue baton of command with four sets of open yellow crowns placed two and one in saltire".

== Chiefs of Joint Operations ==
No.	Portrait	Chief of Defence Staff	Took office	Left office	Time in office	Defence branch	Chief of Defence (Note: Supreme Commander 1937–2024, Chief of Defence 2024–present.)	Ref.
1	Jan Jonsson	Lieutenant general Jan Jonsson (1952–2021)	1 April 2007	31 October 2007	0 years	Air Force	Håkan Syrén	
2	Anders Lindström	Lieutenant general Anders Lindström (born 1955)	1 November 2007	2011	3–4 years	Army	Sverker Göranson	
3	Anders Silwer	Lieutenant general Anders Silwer (born 1959)	1 January 2012	2013	0–1 years	Air Force	Sverker Göranson	-
4	Göran Mårtensson	Lieutenant general Göran Mårtensson (born 1960)	2014	31 January 2016	1–2 years	Army	Sverker Göranson; Micael Bydén	
3	Anders Grenstad	Rear admiral Anders Grenstad (born 1958); Acting	1 February 2016	30 May 2016	119 days	Navy	Micael Bydén	
5	Jan Thörnqvist	Vice admiral Jan Thörnqvist (born 1959)	18 April 2016	2020	3–4 years	Navy	Micael Bydén	
6	Michael Claesson	Lieutenant general Michael Claesson (born 1965)	10 September 2020	31 December 2022	2 years, 112 days	Army	Micael Bydén	
7	Carl-Johan Edström	Lieutenant general Carl-Johan Edström (born 1967)	1 January 2023	30 September 2024	1 year, 273 days	Air Force	Micael Bydén	
8	Ewa Skoog Haslum	Vice general Ewa Skoog Haslum (born 1968)	15 November 2024	Incumbent	1 year, 322 days	Navy	Michael Claesson	

== Deputy Chiefs of Joint Operations ==
No.	Portrait	Chief of Defence Staff	Took office	Left office	Time in office	Defence branch	Chief of Defence	Ref.
1	Bengt Andersson	Brigadier general Bengt Andersson (born 1955)	2007	2008	0–1 years	Army	Håkan Syrén	
2	Anders Brännström	Major general Anders Brännström (born 1957)	2008	2012	3–4 years	Army	Håkan Syrén; Sverker Göranson	
-	Berndt Grundevik	Major general Berndt Grundevik (born 1956); Acting	13 September 2012	2013	0–1 years	Army	Sverker Göranson	
3	Anders Grenstad	Rear admiral Anders Grenstad (born 1958)	1 March 2013	30 May 2016	3 years, 90 days	Navy	Sverker Göranson; Micael Bydén	
4	Berndt Grundevik	Major general Berndt Grundevik (born 1956)	1 June 2016	2017	0–1 years	Army	Micael Bydén	
5	Urban Molin	Major general Urban Molin (born 1960)	1 October 2017	31 March 2021	3 years, 181 days	Army	Micael Bydén	
6	Jonas Wikman	Major general Jonas Wikman (born 1972)	1 April 2021	December 2022	0–1 years	Air Force	Micael Bydén	
7	Fredrik Ståhlberg	Major general Fredrik Ståhlberg (born 1966)	1 January 2023	April 2025	1–2 years	Army	Micael Bydén; Michael Claesson	–
8	Johan Axelsson [sv]	Major general Johan Axelsson (born 1970)	1 May 2025	2025	0 years	Army	Michael Claesson	
9	Stefan Sandborg	Major general Stefan Sandborg (born 1970)	1 November 2025	Incumbent	336 days	Army	Michael Claesson	
