= Värdegrund =

Värdegrund (Swedish: "foundation of values") is a Swedish concept first defined in the late 1990s to describe a common ethical foundation for collectives. Examples of collectives are nations, institutions, organizations, and social movements. In Sweden, all schools have to comply with a common ethical foundation. It includes the following ideas: sanctity of human life, individual freedom and inviolability, egalitarianism, equality of the sexes, and solidarity between people.
