= Claes-Göran Fant =

Swedish Army officer

- Born: Claes-Göran Lennart Fant; 28 January 1951 (age 75); Kungsbacka, Sweden
- Military career
- Allegiance: Sweden
- Branch: Swedish Army
- Service years: 1973–2007
- Rank: Lieutenant General
- Commands: Norrland Anti-Aircraft Corps; Strategic Plans and Policy Directorate; Swedish Armed Forces Headquarters

Lieutenant General Claes-Göran Lennart Fant (born 28 January 1951) is a Swedish Army officer. His senior commands include commanding officer of the Strategic Plans and Policy Directorate and head of the Swedish Armed Forces Headquarters.

== Early life ==
Fant was born on 28 January 1951 in Kungsbacka, Sweden. After mandatory military service in the Göta Anti-Aircraft Regiment (Lv 6) in Gothenburg, he attended the Military Academy Karlberg and was commissioned as an officer in 1973.

== Career ==
=== Military career ===
Fant served in Göta Anti-Aircraft Regiment and was promoted to captain in 1976 and in 1981 he commence a one-year long staff course at the Swedish Armed Forces Staff College after which he was promoted to major in 1982. In 1983, Fant served abroad as part of a UN peacekeeping mission. He served as company commander in the Göta Anti-Aircraft Regiment during two years until 1986, including commander of the brigade anti-aircraft company in the staff of the Värmland Brigade (IB 2). He then completed two-year long higher staff course at the Swedish Armed Forces Staff College. Fan was promoted to lieutenant colonel and served as battalion commander in Göta Anti-Aircraft Regiment from 1991 to 1993. He then served as chief of staff in the Initial Operations Planning Group (IOPG) in Vienna for the Nagorno-Karabakh conflict from 1993 to 1994 when he was promoted to colonel.

Fant served as commanding officer of the Norrland Anti-Aircraft Corps (Lv 7) from 1994 to 1997 and was promoted to senior colonel in 1996. He was then head of the Leadership Department (Ledarskapsinstitutionen) at the Swedish National Defence College and head of department at the Swedish Armed Forces Headquarters. In 1999, Fant was appointed head of the Development Department of the Strategic Plans and Policy Directorate (Strategiledningens utvecklingsavdelning) and in 2000 he attended the Royal College of Defence Studies in the United Kingdom and was promoted to brigadier general. On 1 July 2002, Fan was promoted to major general and was appointed deputy head of the Strategic Plans and Policy Directorate (Strategiledningen). He was then head of the Strategic Plans and Policy Directorate at the Swedish Armed Forces Headquarters from 21 June 2004 to 31 December 2004. In this capacity, Fant was also head of the Swedish Armed Forces Headquarters. On 26 August 2004, this appointment was prolonged until 30 June 2005. Fant later served as head of development with responsibility for the transformation of the forces from conscription to modern mobile rapid reaction forces. He also served as an expert in the Swedish Defence Commission (Försvarsberedningen) from 17 August 2005 to 19 February 2007. He was promoted to lieutenant general on 1 September 2005.

=== Post-retirement ===
Fant is owner of Fant Service and Development AB from 2009 and he served as senior advisor of Strategic Solutions AB from January 2011 to 2015 and senior consultant of Solid affärs coaching AB from 2013 to 2015.

== Dates of rank ==
- 1973 – Second lieutenant
- 19?? – Lieutenant
- 1976 – Captain
- 1982 – Major
- 1991 – Lieutenant colonel
- 1994 – Colonel
- 1996 – Senior colonel
- 2000 – Brigadier general
- 2002 – Major general
- 2005 – Lieutenant general

== Honours ==
- Member of the Royal Swedish Academy of War Sciences (1996)

Military offices
Preceded by Claes Sundin	Norrland Anti-Aircraft Corps; 1994–1997	Succeeded by Roger Kempainen
Preceded by Johan Kihl	Strategic Plans and Policy Directorate; 2004–2005	Succeeded by None
Preceded by Johan Kihl	Swedish Armed Forces Headquarters; 2004–2005	Succeeded by Jörgen Ericsson as Chief of Staff of the Swedish Armed Forces Headquarters
