= Land Component Command =

- Arméns taktiska stab
- Active: 1994–2018
- Country: Sweden
- Allegiance: Swedish Armed Forces
- Branch: Swedish Army
- Type: Military staff
- Role: Operational, territorial and tactical operations
- Size: Staff
- Part of: Swedish Armed Forces Headquarters
- Garrison/HQ: Stockholm

Land Component Command (Swedish: Arméns taktiska stab, ATS) was a part of the Joint Forces Command of the Swedish Armed Forces. The staff was located at the Swedish Armed Forces Headquarters in Stockholm. The Land Component Command commanded the operations of the Swedish Army.

== History ==
The Land Component Command was established in 1994 under the name of the Army Tactical Center (Arméns taktiska centrum, ATC) which has its origin in the Army Staff which was disbanded on 30 June 1994 in connection with the Swedish Armed Forces becoming a single government agency on 1 July 1994. The Army Staff was partly replaced by the Army Command (Arméledningen) on 1 July 1994. The Army Command, which was part of the newly established Swedish Armed Forces Headquarters, was a production unit which sorted directly under the authority of the head of the agency, that is, the Supreme Commander.

On 7 January 1998, the Army Tactical Center was opened at the Bacho House (Bachohuset) in Enköping after about one year of preparation. The center was organized with staff from the former combat arms centers which were dissolved on 31 December 1997. Remaining were the combat arms schools, which were operated the Army Tactical Center.

On 1 July 1998, the Army Tactical Center was reorganized into the Army Center (Armécenter, ArméC), an organization of about 120 employees. The commander became the Inspector General of the Army, which was also deployed in Enköping. On 1 July 2000, the Army Center became the Army Tactical Command (Arméns taktiska kommando, ATK). At the same time, nearly twenty units were disbanded. Twenty-one staffs were reduced to six.

The Inspector General and the Army Tactical Command operated in Enköping until 31 December 2002. Then the Inspector General was subsumed in the General Training and Management Directorate (Grundorganisationsledningen) in the Swedish Armed Forces Headquarters with a clear role in the Training & Procurement Staff. The government established a name change for the inspectors. For the army became the title became Inspector of the Army. The tactical commands were subsumed in the Joint Forces Command (OPIL) and was deployed in Uppsala. A five-year period, when the army was commanded from Enköping came to an end. On 1 April 2007, the command was reorganized and renamed the Land Component Command (Arméns taktiska stab, ATS), and then is sorted under the Joint Forces Command.

In February 2018, the Swedish Armed Forces proposed in its budget for 2019 to the Government a reorganization of the command structure. The proposal was, among other things, designed with a new command and new organizational units in new locations. This was to provide better conditions for a robust and sustainable command. The new organizational units that the Swedish Armed Forces wanted to form were proposed to be named the Army Staff, the Air Staff and the Naval Staff. These would be formed by a merger of the Training & Development Staff and the Joint Forces Command, as well as other complementary parts from the Swedish Armed Forces Headquarters and the Defence Materiel Administration. The staffs were proposed to be formed on 1 January 2019 and commanded by an army chief, a naval chief and an air force chief.

== Garrisons and training areas ==
When the staff was formed as Army Command (Arméledningen), it was located at the Bastionen building at Lidingövägen 24 in Stockholm. On 7 January 1998, new premises were opened for staff at Stockholmsvägen 1 in Enköping. The property, which was adjacent to the Uppland Regiment (S 1), is more famous as the Bacho House (Bachohuset), and was the executive building of the company ABB Fläkt. On 1 January 2003, the staff were relocated to Uppsala Garrison, where the staff for the Joint Forces Command (OPIL) was deployed. In 2007, the staff returned to the Bastionen building in Stockholm.

== Heraldry ==
The coat of arms of the Army Tactical Center (1997–1998), Army Center (1998–2000), Army Tactical Command (2000–2007) and the Land Component Command (2007–2018). Blazon: "Azure, two swords in saltire, or".

== Commanding officers ==
=== Arméledningen ===
- 1 July 1994 – 30 March 1996: Lieutenant general Åke Sagrén
- 1 April 1996 – 31 December 1997: Lieutenant general Mertil Melin

=== Armécentrum ===
==== Chiefs ====
- 1 January 1998 – 30 June 1998: Lieutenant general Mertil Melin
- 1 July 1998 – 30 June 2000: Major general Paul Degerlund

==== Deputy Chiefs ====
- 1998–2000: Senior colonel Knut Einar Jonasson

=== Armétaktiska kommandot ===
==== Chiefs ====
- 1 July 2000 – 2003: Major general Alf Sandqvist
- 2003–2004: Brigadier general Jöns Sven Håkan Espmark
- 2004–2007: Brigadier general Anders Brännström

==== Deputy Chiefs ====
- 2000–2002: Brigadier general Anders Lindström (Note: As head of the Coordination Department and Deputy Chief.)
- 2003–2004: Lieutenant colonel Ulf Siverstedt
- 2004–2007: Lieutenant colonel Stig Olof Granander

=== Armétaktiska stabsledningen ===
==== Chiefs ====
- 1 November 2007 – 13 September 2012: Major general Berndt Grundevik
- 13 September 2012 – 2014: Major general Anders Brännström
- 2014–2017: Brigadier general Stefan Andersson
- 2017–2018: Brigadier general Fredrik Ståhlberg

==== Deputy Chiefs ====
- 2007–2008: Brigadier general Anders Brännström
- 2008–2009: Vacant

==== Chiefs of Staff ====
- 2007–2008: Colonel Stig Olof Granander
- 2008–2009: Colonel Mats Olof Blom
- 2009–2012: Lieutenant colonel Fredrik Ståhlberg
- 2012–2014: Colonel Christer Tistam

== Names, designations and locations ==
Name	Translation	From		To
Arméledningen	Army Command	1994-07-01	–	1997-12-31
Arméns taktiska centrum	Army Tactical Center	1998-01-01	–	1998-06-30
Armécentrum	Army Center	1998-07-01	–	2000-06-30
Armétaktiska kommandot	Army Command	2000-07-01	–	2007-03-31
Arméns taktiska stab	Land Component Command	2007-04-01	–	2018-12-31
Designation		From		To
ATAC		1998-01-01	–	1998-06-30
ArméC		1998-07-01	–	2000-06-30
ATK		2000-07-01	–	2007-03-31
ATS		2007-04-01	–	2018-12-31
Location		From		To
Stockholm Garrison		1994-07-01	–	1997-12-31
Enköping Garrison		1998-01-01	–	2002-12-31
Uppsala Garrison		2003-01-01	–	2008-03-??
Stockholm Garrison		2008-03-??	–	2018-12-31
