= Home Guard Silver Medal =

Swedish reward medal

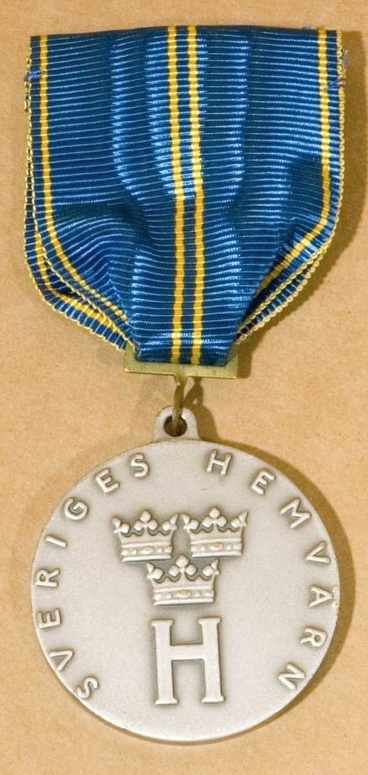
- Type: Category L-medal (Note: Category L includes merit badges or remembrance instituted by the Swedish Armed Forces' organizational units (units, centers and schools), the Home Guard and voluntary defense organizations. The category also includes previously granted carrying permits for e.g. officers 'unions (equivalent) and military associations (kamratföreningar) as well as other badges that have been approved by Swedish Armed Forces Headquarters.)
- Awarded for: Significant service contributed to the development of the Home Guard
- Country: Sweden
- Presented by: Home Guard
- Eligibility: Swedish and foreign personnel
- Status: Currently awarded
- Established: 1951
- Ribbon bar

The Home Guard Silver Medal (Swedish: Hemvärnets silvermedalj, HvSM) is a Swedish reward medal established in 1951 by the National Home Guard Council (Rikshemvärnsrådet). It is awarded for significant service contributed to the development of the Home Guard.

== History ==
The Home Guard Silver Medal was instituted in 1951 by the National Home Guard Council (Rikshemvärnsrådet).

== Appearance ==
=== Medal ===
The silver medal, of round shape, is on the obverse provided with the Home Guard's emblem with the inscription "Sweden's Home Guard" and on the reverse with a laurel wreath and the possibility of embossing names and years. For Home Guard musicians, the reverse side is also marked with a music sign. The medal is minted in a size corresponding to the eighth size.

=== Ribbon ===
The ribbon is of blue moiré pattern with 2 mm wide yellow stripes, one yellow stripe on each side and two yellow stripes on the middle.

== Criteria ==
Awarded to those who through significant service have contributed to the development of the Home Guard, in addition to what the service requires.

== Quantity ==
The number of silver medals that the Home Guard Council may award annually is determined by the National Home Guard Council.

== Presenting ==
Decisions on awarding are made by the Home Guard Council (Hemvärnsråd). The silver medal is presented during a ceremony together with a diploma. The costs for silver medals are paid by the current Home Guard Council or by gift funds according to a decision by the current Home Guard Council.

The merit medal can also be awarded to a foreign citizen for special reasons.
