= Joint Forces Command (Sweden) =

- Operativa insatsledningen
- Active: 2000–2005
- Country: Sweden
- Allegiance: Swedish Armed Forces
- Branch: Joint
- Type: Staff
- Role: Operational, territorial and tactical operations
- Part of: Swedish Armed Forces Headquarters
- Garrison/HQ: Uppsala

Insignia
- Colour

Joint Forces Command (Swedish: Operativa insatsledningen, OPIL), was a senior command staff within the Swedish Armed Forces which operated from 2000 to 2005. The staff was located in Uppsala Garrison in Uppsala. The Joint Forces Command managed allocated joint capabilities from the three armed services.

== History ==
In connection with the changed management organization and the restructuring of the Swedish Armed Forces towards an operational defense, the Joint Forces Command was established on 1 July 2000. It thus took over most of the tasks previously served by the three military area staffs, the operational management in the Swedish Armed Forces Headquarters, as well as the Army, Navy and Air Force tactical staffs. With the establishment of Joint Forces Command, the staff of leading operational and tactical activities was reduced from nearly two thousand people to about 270.

In the summer of 2005, the Joint Forces Command was disbanded, and the Operational Staff (Operativa staben, OPS) was divided into two parts; the Joint Support Staff (Insatsstaben) and the Operational Unit (Operativa enheten, OpE). In 2008, the Operational Unit was disbanded and was replaced by the Joint Forces Command (Insatsledningen, INS).

== Tasks ==
The main tasks of the Joint Forces Command were to implement national and international operational command, lead training activities and support the Swedish Armed Forces Headquarters' operations management, function development and personnel management. The Joint Forces Command had within the framework of the basic organization been dimensioned for management in peace to low level crisis. In order for management at higher levels of crisis to be exercised, the Joint Forces Command required supply of management skills to get the necessary stamina.

== Units ==
OPIL consisted of four staffs:

- Operational Staff (Operativa staben, OPS), which, in the context of OPIL operations, conducted land, air and naval forces' joint operations.
- Air Force Tactical Command (FTK), led the operations of the air forces.
- Army Tactical Command (ATK), led the operations of the ground forces and the Swedish International Force (Utlandsstyrkan).
- Naval Tactical Command (MTK), led the operations of the maritime forces, including the operations of the amphibious units.

== Locations ==
In connection with the formation of the Joint Forces Command, it was initially placed to various buildings in central Stockholm. As a permanent place, the government proposed that the staff should be placed in Bålsta. No decision was made on this matter, but was put to further investigation. The Swedish Armed Forces reported different location options, including Bålsta, Muskö Naval Base and Uppsala-Ärna Airport, where they themselves advocated Bålsta. All options would involve an investment of approximately SEK 300-400 million. On behalf of the Ministry of Defence, the Swedish Armed Forces investigated further alternative localizations within the Stockholm area, where they proposed a location to Näsbypark in Täby Municipality. Placing the staff to Näsbypark would include an investment of approximately SEK 260 million. The premises were also considered flexible for future changes in operations, and could be adapted without extensive new buildings construction. The government's proposal was based on the fact that the location of the Joint Forces Command in Näsbypark was to begin on 1 April 2002, and as a whole be located there no later than 31 December 2004. After the September 11 attacks the government highlighted vulnerability with conventional buildings, civilians and buildings in connection with an attacker's target. Consequently, the decision to locate the Joint Forces Command to Näsbypark was repealed. As an alternative to Näsbypark, it was decided that the Joint Forces Command should be located at Uppsala-Ärna Airport no later than 31 December 2004.

From 1 January 2003, the units of the Joint Forces Command began to be located in Uppsala. The Air Force Tactical Command and the Army Tactical Command (from Enköping) were already in place at the beginning of 2003. During late autumn of 2003, parts of the Operational Staff (Operativa staben, OPS) moved from Stockholm. In 2004, the remaining parts of the Operational Staff with its commanding officer were moved to Uppsala along with the Naval Tactical Command, which were moved from Muskö. However, in Uppsala, the existing premises were not enough, but temporary leases of removable buildings were made to a considerable extent. The barracks in Uppsala thus became a stock of construction barracks, although some functions could be accommodated in existing buildings. Following the disbandment of the Joint Forces Command, the tactical commands remained in Uppsala until 2007, when they were relocated to the building Bastionen ("The Bastion") in Stockholm.

== Heraldry and traditions ==
=== Coat of arms ===
The coat of arms of the Joint Forces Command. Blazon: "Azure, a sword bendwise and a baton bendwise sinister in saltire, both or, the baton charged with open crowns azure placed in sections of two and one".

=== Colours, standards and guidons ===
The colour of the Joint Forces Command consist of three double swallow-tailed Swedish flags. The first colour was presented to the former Brigade Center (Brigadcentrum, BrigC) in 1995. The second was presented to the then 1st Squadron Staff (1.eskaderstaben) in 1976 and the third to the former Coastal Fleet in 1976.

=== Command flag ===
The command flag of the Chief of the Joint Forces Command is today used by the Chief of Joint Operations. The command flag is drawn by Kristina Holmgård-Åkerberg and embroidered by hand in insertion technique by MajBritt Salander/firma Blå Kusten. Blazon: "Fessed in blue and yellow; on blue, three yellow open crowns placed two and one, on yellow a blue sword sinister and a blue baton of command with four sets of open yellow crowns placed two and one in saltire".

Command flag

== Commanding officers ==
No.	Portrait	Name	Took office	Left office	Time in office	Defence branch	Supreme Commander	Ref.
1	Jan Jonsson	Major General; Jan Jonsson (1952–2021)	1 July 2000	2004	3 years, 364 days	Air Force	Johan Hederstedt; Håkan Syrén	
2	Tony Stigsson	Major General; Tony Stigsson (born 1956)	1 September 2004	2005	0–1 years	Army	Håkan Syrén	

== Names, designations and locations ==
Name	Translation	From		To
Operativa insatsledningen	Joint Forces Command	2000-07-01	–	2005-06-30
Designation		From		To
OPIL		2000-07-01	–	2005-06-30
Location		From		To
Stockholm Garrison		2000-07-01	–	2004-08-31
Uppsala Garrison		2004-09-01	–	2005-06-30
