= Swedish Armed Forces Headquarters =

Highest level of command within the Swedish Armed Forces

Coordinates: 59°20′47″N 18°5′14″E

- Högkvarteret
- Active: 1994–present
- Country: Sweden
- Type: Headquarters
- Part of: Swedish Armed Forces
- Garrison/HQ: Stockholm
- March: "Svenska marschen" (unknown) (Note: The march was adopted on 29 September 1999 as the Swedish Armed Forces' parade march.) "Under blågul fana" (Widqvist) (Note: The march was adopted on 29 September 1999 as the Swedish Armed Forces' march.)

Commanders
- CO: LtGen Carl-Johan Edström
- Director General: Mikael Granholm

Insignia
- Colour

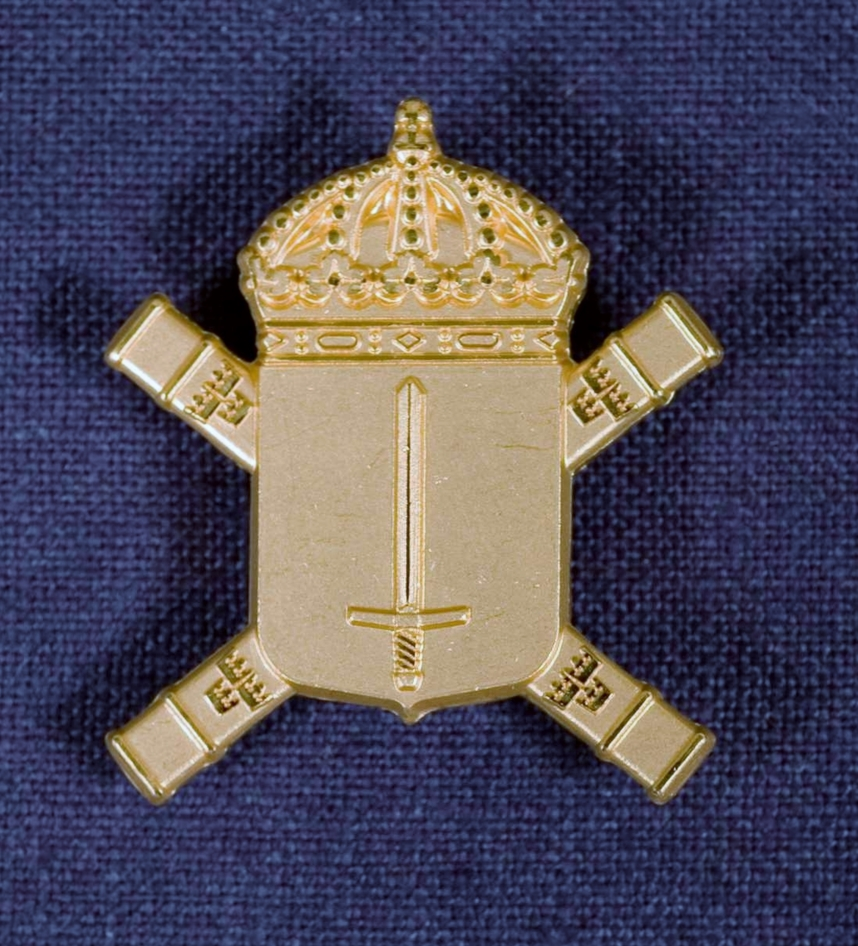
- Insignia

The Swedish Armed Forces Headquarters (Swedish: Högkvarteret, HKV) is the highest level of command in the Swedish Armed Forces. Established in 1994, its primary task is to command operations, but is also involved in areas such as military strategy, the overall development of the Swedish Armed Forces, and acting as a channel of contact with government. It's located at Lidingövägen 24 at Gärdet in Stockholm.

== History ==
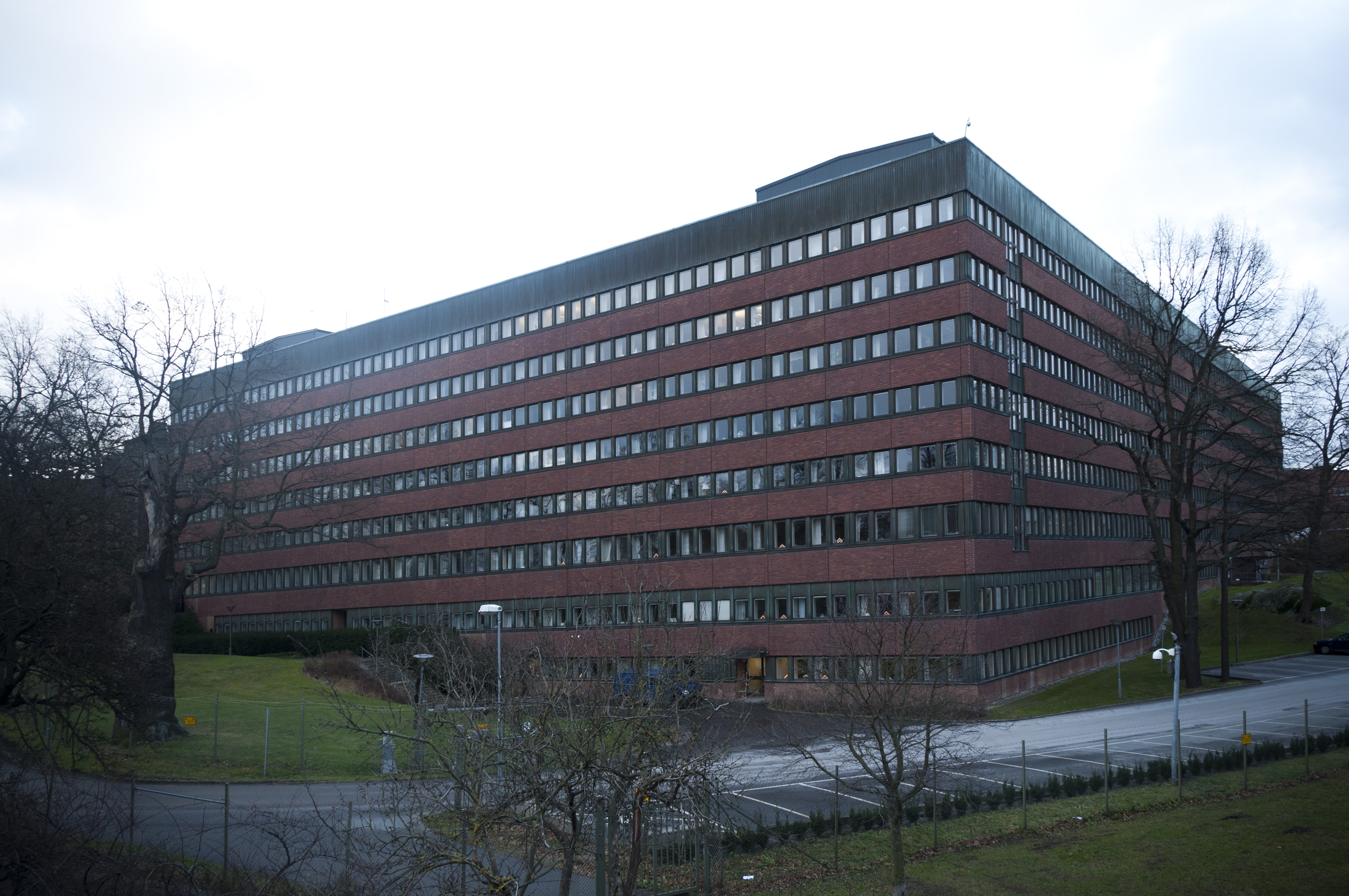
The Swedish Armed Forces Headquarters is located at Lidingövägen 24 in Stockholm.

=== 1994–1998 ===
On 1 July 1994 a major reorganization of the Swedish Armed Forces was carried out and of the then central staffs. From having consisted of more than a hundred different agencies, the Swedish Armed Forces was now organized into a single agency (Sweden's largest agency). The Defence Staff and the three military branch staffs, the Army Staff, Air Staff and the Naval Staff, were organized simultaneously into a joint headquarters. The then headquarters consisted of four commands; Joint Operations Command (Operationsledningen, OpL), Army Command (Arméledningen), Naval Command (Marinledningen) and Air Force Command (Flygvapenledningen) and three staffs: Planning Staff (Planeringsstaben), the Intelligence and Security Staff (Underrättelse- och säkerhetsstaben) and the Joint Staff (Gemensamma staben). The Joint Staff included a large number of more or less independent departments that was regarded as joint group support. That is, the headquarters has housed both staff parts and executive parts in so-called commands. The chiefs of the commands had also been known as Central Production Leaders (Centrala Produktionsledare, CPL). The CPL's have had under the Supreme Commander the responsibility for the development, maintenance and decommissioning of war units within specifically designated so-called programs (eg program 2 army units or program 7 naval ship units, etc.).

=== 1998–2000 ===
A new organization of the headquarters was adopted on 1 July 1998. The Army, Naval and Air Force Commands ceased to exist, as well as the positions of the Chief of Army Staff, Chief of Air Force Staff and Chief of Navy Staff. Its tasks were transferred to two newly created directorates within the headquarters; the Joint Forces Directorate (Krigsförbandsledningen) and the General Training and Management Directorate (Grundorganisationsledningen), and to three new "centers"; the Army Center in Enköping, the Navy Center at Berga and the Air Force Center in Uppsala. The Joint Operations Command (Operationsledningen, OpL) was also created, with responsibility for planning and leading operational operations within and outside Sweden, both in peace and in war, as well as for the war organization, its ability and preparedness. Two staffs were also created; the Planning Staff (Planeringsstaben) which was the agency's preparatory body to focus and prioritize the operations, and the Human Resources Staff (Personalstaben, PERSS), which was the agency's preparatory body for matters concerning human resources. In order to relieve the Supreme Commander, a special position as Deputy Supreme Commander was created. These two together constituted the executive group. The Deputy Supreme Commander led the headquarters efforts through the coordination of the operations. He also had the employer responsibility for the staff at the headquarters. To help to coordinate operations, he had a Coordination Department.

=== 2000–2004 ===
Through the Defence Act of 2000, the headquarters was reorganized again. The Joint Forces Command was established by, among other things, parts of the headquarters' Joint Operations Command. The Joint Forces Command came to consist of four parts: an operation command, the Army Tactical Command, the Naval Tactical Command and the Air Force Tactical Command. The Chief of Home Guard with staff functions were incorporated into the headquarters. The biggest and most important change in the headquarters was that the Strategic Plans and Policy Directorate (Strategiledningen) was established. It was created mainly by parts of the then Joint Operations Command and Planning Staff. The Strategic Plans and Policy Directorate would act as the agency's direction and planning body. In summary, the headquarters consisted of the agency's command staff, three units, namely, the Strategic Plans and Policy Directorate, the Joint Forces Directorate and the General Training and Management Directorate, and a staff unit, namely the Personnel Staff. In addition to these units, there were within the headquarters the Swedish Armed Forces Security Inspectorate (Försvarsmaktens säkerhetsinspektion), the Swedish Military Intelligence and Security Service and independent departments for, among other things, position presentation, coordination, law and administration.

In July 2002, a management investigation was completed which pointed to a number of problems that needed to be solved. This concerned important issues such as coordination of work processes within the Headquarters and management and follow-up of the units around the country. The investigation's proposal resulted, among other things, in the introduction of a commander of the Headquarters who would be responsible for and control the work processes in the central command. Other measures that were taken were that the then Inspectors General (Army Inspector General, Air Force Inspector General, Navy Inspector General) were included in the Headquarters' General Training and Management Directorate (Grundorganisationsledningen), and that new positions as Inspector of Communications and Information Systems (Ledningsinspektör) and Inspector of Training (Utbildningsinspektör) were established. Furthermore, the Joint Forces Command formally became part of the Headquarters. However, a proposal from the investigation to merge the Joint Forces Directorate (Krigsförbandsledningen) and the General Training and Management Directorate into a unit with overall responsibility for the annual production of units was not implemented. The investigation proposed that the Headquarters should be reduced by 240 positions. In January 2004, reductions of 170 positions had been implemented.

=== 2005–2007 ===
From 1 July 2005, the Headquarters had a process-oriented command structure. The Swedish Armed Forces would thereby have three main processes; the Utvecklings- och inriktningsprocessen, Produktionsprocessen and Insatsprocessen. In addition, there was a Ledningsprocessen and the Military Intelligence and Security Service with associated personnel. The biggest change with the new organization was that parts of the operations within the former Joint Forces Directorate (Krigsförbandsledningen) and the General Training and Management Directorate (Grundorganisationsledningen) were brought together in the Produktionsprocessen. In addition to this, there were various support units, e.g. the Kompetensförsörjningsprocessen and Ekonomiprocessen. Organizationally, the Headquarters consisted of a command unit of 191 people, another unit of 332 people and an operational unit of 228 people. The latter was located in Uppsala. In addition to the above units, an administrative unit of 107 people was added.

== Heraldry and traditions ==
=== Coat of arms ===
From 1994 to 2001, the Swedish Armed Forces Headquarters had the lesser coat of arms with a sword in gold as an heraldic arm. Blazon: "Azure, the lesser coat of arms of Sweden, three open crowns or placed two and one. The shield surmounting an erect sword of the last colour". This coat of arms was used by the Supreme Commander from 1991 to 1993 and is currently used by the Swedish Armed Forces since 1993. In 2001, the headquarters adopted a new coat of arms. Blazon: "Azure, an erect sword or. The shield surmounting two batons in saltire of the last colour, the batons charged with open crowns azure placed two and one."

Coat of arms used from 1994 to 2001.

Coat of arms used from 2001.

=== Colours, standards and guidons ===
The colour of the Swedish Armed Forces Headquarters is a double swallow-tailed Swedish flag. The flag was presented to the Defence Staff (Fst) in 1992.

=== Medals ===
In 2010, the Högkvarterets förtjänstmedalj ("Swedish Armed Forces Headquarters Medal of Merit") in gold and silver (HKVGM/SM) was established.

Ribbon bar of the Swedish Armed Forces Headquarters Medal of Merit

== Commanding officers ==
In conjunction with the Swedish Armed Forces Headquarters reorganization in 1998, a special position was created as Deputy Supreme Commander to relieve the Supreme Commander of the Swedish Armed Forces. The Deputy Supreme Commander led the Headquarters work through coordination of the operations. He also exercised employer responsibility for the staff in the Headquarters. In order to coordinate the operations he had a Coordination Department. A formal position of chief of the Swedish Armed Forces Headquarters was established in 2002. Since 1 January 2023, the Chief of the Defence Staff is the head of the Swedish Armed Forces Headquarters.

=== Heads ===
- 1998–2001: Frank Rosenius, as Deputy Supreme Commander
- 2001–2002: Hans Berndtson, as Deputy Supreme Commander
- 2002–2004: Johan Kihl, as Chief of the Strategic Plans and Policy Directorate and the Swedish Armed Forces Headquarters
- 2004–2005: Claes-Göran Fant, as Chief of the Strategic Plans and Policy Directorate and the Swedish Armed Forces Headquarters
- 2005–2007: Jörgen Ericsson, as Chief of Staff of the Swedish Armed Forces Headquarters
- 2007–2009: Sverker Göranson, as Chief of Defence Staff and Chief of Staff of the Swedish Armed Forces Headquarters
- 2009–2014: Jan Salestrand, as Chief of Defence Staff and head of the Swedish Armed Forces Headquarters
- 2014–2018: Dennis Gyllensporre, as Chief of Defence Staff and head of the Swedish Armed Forces Headquarters
- 2018–2022: Jonas Haggren, as Chief of Defence Staff and head of the Swedish Armed Forces Headquarters
- 2023–2024: Michael Claesson, as Chief of the Defence Staff and head of the Swedish Armed Forces Headquarters
- 2024–20xx: Carl-Johan Edström, as Chief of the Defence Staff and head of the Swedish Armed Forces Headquarters

=== Deputy heads ===
- 11 December 2020 – 31 May 2024: Colonel Mikael Åkerström
- 1 June 2025 – present: Colonel Johan Larsson

== Names, designations and locations ==
Name	Translation	From		To
Högkvarteret	Swedish Armed Forces Headquarters	1994-07-01	–	
Designation		From		To
HKV		1994-07-01	–	
Location		From		To
Stockholm Garrison		1994-07-01	–	
