= Structure of the Swedish Army =

The following is an overview of the Swedish Army's operational organisation between 2025 and 2030. The Swedish Army is commanded by the Chief of Defence (Överbefälhavaren) based at the Headquarters (Högkvarteret) in Stockholm. Regiments are responsible for training and producing wartime units, while specialised training centres focus on advanced or specific skills for specialised troops.

The army's main combat formation is the 1st Division, which consists of three mechanised and one infantry brigade.

== Army Staff ==
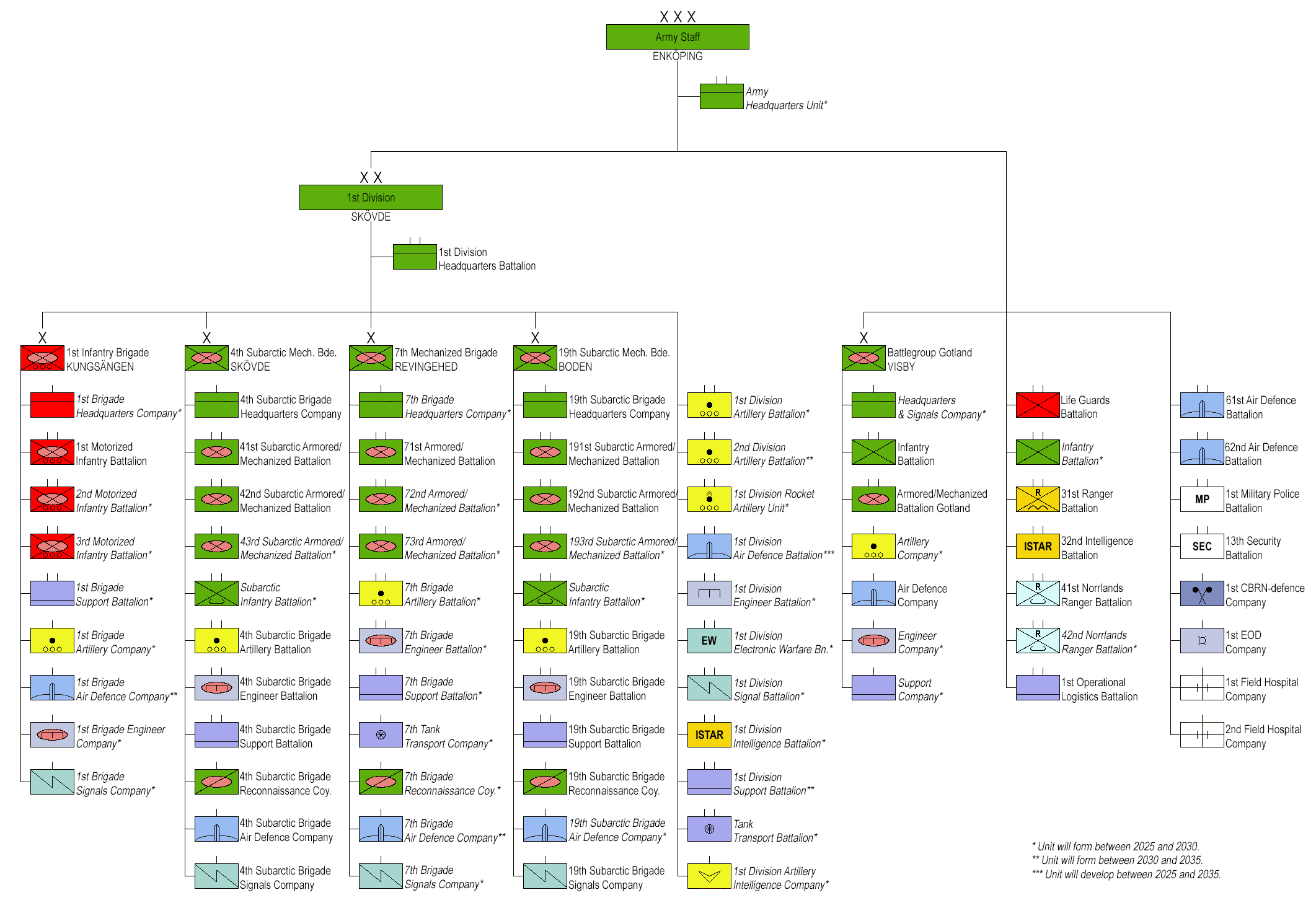
Swedish Army operational organisation 2026-2030 (click to enlarge)

- Army Staff (Arméstaben)
  - Army Headquarters Unit (Arméledningsförbandet - forming)
  - Life Guards Battalion (Livbataljonen)
  - 1st Military Police Battalion (1. militärpolisbataljonen), in Kungsängen — formed by the Life Guards Regiment
  - 13th Security Battalion (13. säkerhetsbataljonen), in Kungsängen — formed by the Life Guards Regiment
  - 31st Ranger Battalion (31. jägarbataljonen), in Karlsborg — formed by the Life Hussars Regiment
  - 32nd Intelligence Battalion (32. underrättelsebataljonen), in Karlsborg — formed by the Life Hussars Regiment
  - 41st Arctic Ranger Battalion (41. norrlandsjägarbataljonen), in Arvidsjaur — formed by the Norrland Dragoon Regiment
  - 42nd Arctic Ranger Battalion (42. norrlandsjägarbataljonen - forming), in Arvidsjaur — formed by the Norrland Dragoon Regiment
  - 61st Air Defence Battalion (61. luftvärnsbataljonenen)
  - 62nd Air Defence Battalion (62. luftvärnsbataljonenen)
  - 1× Infantry Battalion (Skyttebataljon - one of the 5× infantry battalions, which will be formed before 2030, will be assigned to the Army Staff)
  - 1st CBRN Company (1. CBRN-kompaniet)
  - 1st EOD Company (1. ammunitionsröjningskompaniet)
  - 1st Field Hospital Company (1. sjukhuskompaniet)
  - 2nd Field Hospital Company (2. sjukhuskompaniet)
  - 1st Operational Logistics Battalion (1. operativa logistikbataljonen)

=== Battlegroup Gotland ===
- Battlegroup Gotland (Stridsgrupp Gotland), in Visby — formed by the Gotland Regiment
  - Battlegroup Staff (Stridsgruppstab)
  - Headquarters and Signals Company (Ledning- sambandskompani - forming)
  - Armored/Mechanised Battalion Gotland (Pansar-/mekaniserad bataljon Gotland)
  - Infantry Battalion (Skyttebataljon - one of the 5× infantry battalions, which will be formed before 2030, will be assigned to the Battlegroup Gotland)
  - Artillery Company (Artillerikompani - forming)
  - Air Defence Company (Luftvärnskompani)
  - Engineer Company (Ingenjörkompani - forming)
  - Support Company (Underhållskompani - forming)

=== 1st Division ===
- 1st Division, in Skövde
  - 1st Division Staff (Divisionsstab)
  - 1st Division Headquarters Battalion (Divisionsledningsbataljon - forming), in Skövde — formed by the Command and Control Regiment
  - 1st Division Artillery Battalion (Divisionsartilleribataljon - forming)
  - 1st Division Rocket Artillery Unit (Divisionsraketartilleriförband - forming)
  - 1st Division Engineer Battalion (Divisionsingenjörbataljon - forming), in Eksjö — formed by the Göta Engineer Regiment
  - 1st Division Electronic Warfare Battalion (Divisionstelekrigbataljon - forming), in Enköping — formed by the Command and Control Regiment
  - 1st Division Signals Battalion (Divisionsförbindelsebataljon - forming)
  - 1st Division Intelligence Battalion (Divisionsunderrättelsebataljon - forming)
  - Tank Transport Battalion (Stridsvagnstransportbataljon - forming)
  - 1st Division Artillery Intelligence Company (Divisionsartilleriunderrättelsekompani - forming)

A second division artillery battalion, as well as a Division Support Battalion ("Divisionsunderhållsbataljon"), will form after 2030. The Swedish Armed Forces Wartime Organisation also mentions that a Division Air Defence Battalion (Divisionsluftvärnsbataljon) will be "Developed gradually in the period" between 2025 and 2035.

==== 1st Infantry Brigade ====
- 1st Infantry Brigade (IB 1), in Kungsängen — formed by the Life Guards Regiment (Note: Responsible for the defence of the capital Stockholm.)
  - 1st Infantry Brigade Staff (1. Brigadstab)
    - 1st Brigade Headquarters Company (1. Brigadledningskompani - forming)
    - 1st Brigade Signals Company (1. Brigadsambandskompani - forming)
  - 3× Motorised Infantry Battalions (3× Motoriserad skyttebataljon - 2× of which are forming)
  - 1st Brigade Support Battalion (1. Brigadunderhållsbataljon - forming)
  - 1st Brigade Artillery Company (1. Brigadartillerikompani - forming)
  - 1st Brigade Engineer Company (1. Brigadingenjörkompani - forming)

A Brigade Air Defence Company (Brigadluftvärnskompani) will form after 2030.

==== 4th Subarctic Mechanised Brigade ====
- 4th Subarctic Mechanised Brigade (4. Subarktisk mekaniserad brigad), in Skövde — formed by the Skaraborg Regiment
  - 4th Brigade Staff (4. Brigadstab)
    - 4th Subarctic Brigade Headquarters Company (4. Subarktisk brigadledningskompani)
    - 4th Subarctic Brigade Signals Company (4. Subarktisk brigadsambandskompani)
    - 4th Subarctic Brigade Reconnaissance Company (4. Subarktisk brigadspaningskompani)
    - 4th Subarctic Brigade Air Defence Company (4. Subarktisk brigadluftvärnskompani)
  - 3× Subarctic Armoured/Mechanised Battalions (3× Subarktisk pansar-/mekaniserad bataljon - 1× of which is forming)
  - 1× Subarctic Infantry Battalion (1× Subarktisk skyttebataljon - forming)
  - 4th Subarctic Brigade Artillery Battalion (4. Subarktisk brigadartilleribataljon)
  - 4th Subarctic Brigade Engineer Battalion (4. Subarktisk brigadingenjörbataljon)
  - 4th Subarctic Brigade Support Battalion (4. Subarktisk brigadunderhållsbataljon)

==== 7th Mechanised Brigade ====
- 7th Mechanised Brigade (Mekaniserad brigad), in Revingehed — formed by the South Skåne Regiment
  - 7th Brigade Staff (7. Brigadstab)
    - 7th Brigade Headquarters Company (7. Brigadledningskompani - forming)
    - 7th Brigade Signals Company (7. Brigadsambandskompani - forming)
    - 7th Brigade Reconnaissance Company (7. Brigadspaningskompani - forming)
  - 3× Armoured/Mechanised Battalions (3× Pansar-/mekaniserad bataljon - 2× of which are forming)
  - 7th Brigade Artillery Battalion (7. Brigadartilleribataljon - forming)
  - 7th Brigade Engineer Battalion (7. Brigadingenjörbataljon - forming)
  - 7th Brigade Support Battalion (7. Brigadunderhållsbataljon - forming)
  - Tank Transport Company (Stridsvagnstransportkompani - forming)

A Brigade Air Defence Company (Brigadluftvärnskompani) will form after 2030.

==== 19th Subarctic Mechanised Brigade ====
- 19th Subarctic Mechanised Brigade (19. Subarktisk mekaniserad brigad), in Boden — formed by the Norrbotten Regiment (Note: Responsible for the defence of northern Sweden.)
  - 19th Brigade Staff (19. Brigadstab)
    - 19th Subarctic Brigade Headquarters Company (19. Subarktisk brigadledningskompani)
    - 19th Subarctic Brigade Signals Company (19. Subarktisk brigadsambandskompani)
    - 19th Subarctic Brigade Reconnaissance Company (19. Subarktisk brigadspaningskompani)
    - 19th Subarctic Brigade Air Defence Company (19. Subarktisk brigadluftvärnskompani - forming)
  - 3× Subarctic Armoured/Mechanised Battalions (3× Subarktisk pansar-/mekaniserad bataljon - 1× of which is forming)
  - 1× Subarctic Infantry Battalion (1× Subarktisk skyttebataljon - forming)
  - 19th Subarctic Brigade Artillery Battalion (19. Subarktisk brigadartilleribataljon)
  - 19th Subarctic Brigade Engineer Battalion (19. Subarktisk brigadingenjörbataljon)
  - 19th Subarctic Brigade Support Battalion (19. Subarktisk brigadunderhållsbataljon)

== Geographic distribution ==
Swedish Army locations 2025:
Units: Mechanised Infantry Rangers Air Defence Other

== Sources ==
- Försvarsmakten (5 Jun 2024a). "Krigsorganisationens utveckling 2025-2035" (PDF). forsvarsmakten.se (in Swedish).
- Försvarsmakten (30 Sep 2024b). "Överbefälhavarens uppdrag". forsvarsmakten.se (in Swedish).
- Försvarsmakten (18 Aug 2023). "Högkvarteret". forsvarsmakten.se (in Swedish).
- Ahlin, Urban (27 Oct 2010). "Militärverksamheten i Såtenäs, Skövde och Karlsborg". riksdagen.se (in Swedish).
- Försvarsmakten (28 Feb 2020). "Planerad utveckling av krigsorganisationen 2021-2030" (PDF). forsvarsmakten.se (in Swedish). Archived from the original (PDF) on 4 Mar 2021.
- Försvarsmakten (6 Feb 2025a). "Försvarsmedicincentrums insatsförband". forsvarsmakten.se (in Swedish).
- Försvarsmakten (14 May 2025b). "Försvarsmaktens tekniska skola". forsvarsmakten.se (in Swedish).
- Enander, Dag (27 Aug 2024). "Första brigaden återinvigd". forsvarsmakten.se (in Swedish).
- Andersson, Stefan; Norlander, Jonas (5 Jun 2020). "DIVISIONEN – FÖR EN FARLIGARE ARMÉ" (PDF). Halmstad University (in Swedish). Stockholm.
