= List of Swedish Army brigades =

The Swedish Army has had numerous brigades since the mid 20th century.

First introduced through the Defence Act of 1948, brigades would replace regiments as the primary fighting forces in 1951.

Active units shown in bold.

== Infantry ==
Principal brigade formation throughout the Cold War.

- (IB 1) Yellow Brigade at Kungsängen, Stockholm County (1949–1985)
- (IB 1) **Life Guards Brigade** at Kungsängen, Stockholm County (2024–present)
- (IB 2) Värmland Brigade at Kristinehamn, Värmland County (1949–2000)
- (IB 3) Life Brigade at Örebro, Örebro County (1949–1992)
- (IB 4) Grenadier Brigade at Linköping, Östergötland County (1949–1994)
- (IB 4) Life Grenadier Brigade at Linköping, Östergötland County (1994–1997)
- (IB 10) Södermanland Brigade at Strängnäs, Södermanland County (1957–1963)
- (IB 11) Kronoberg Brigade at Växjö, Kronoberg County (1949–1993)
- (IB 12) Jönköping Brigade at Eksjö, Jönköping County (1949–1992)
- (IB 12) Småland Brigade at Eksjö, Jönköping County (1994–2000)
- (IB 13) Dalarna Brigade at Falun, Dalarna County (1949–1986)
- (IB 14) Gästrike Brigade at Gävle, Gävleborg County (1949–1993)
- (IB 15) Västgöta Brigade at Borås, Västra Götaland County (1949–1992)
- (IB 15) Älvsborg Brigade at Borås, Västra Götaland County (1994–1997)
- (IB 16) Halland Brigade at Halmstad, Halland County (1994–2000)
- (IB 17) Bohus Brigade at Uddevalla, Västra Götaland County (1949–1992)
- (IB 18) Gotland Brigade at Visby, Gotland County (1949–1966)
- (IB 19) Norrbotten Brigade at Boden, Norrbotten County (1949–1964)
- (IB 20) Västerbotten Brigade at Umeå, Västerbotten County (1949–1964)
- (IB 21) Ådal Brigade at Sollefteå, Västernorrland County (1949–1992)
- (IB 25) Ranger Brigade at Östersund, Jämtland County (1949–1957)
- (IB 26) Kristianstad Brigade at Kristianstad, Skåne County (1949–1963)
- (IB 28) Uppland Brigade at Uppsala, Uppsala County (1949–1957)
- (IB 33) Närke Brigade at Örebro, Örebro County (1949–1992)
- (IB 34) Östgöta Brigade at Linköping, Östergötland County (1949–1961)
- (IB 35) Härjedal Brigade at Östersund, Jämtland County (1949–1963)
- (IB 37) Skåne Brigade at Kristianstad, Skåne County (1949–1963)
- (IB 38) Västmanland Brigade at Uppsala, Uppsala County (1949–1957)
- (IB 38) Uppland Brigade at Uppsala, Uppsala County (1957–1985)
- (IB 38) Yellow Brigade at Uppsala, Uppsala County (1985–1994)
- (IB 41) Blekinge Brigade at Växjö, Kronoberg County (1949–1991)
- (IB 42) Kalmar Brigade at Eksjö, Jönköping County (1949–1994)
- (IB 43) Kopparberg Brigade at Falun, Dalarna County (1949–1992)
- (IB 44) Hälsinge Brigade at Gävle, Gävleborg County (1949–1992)
- (IB 45) Älvsborg Brigade at Borås, Västra Götaland County (1963–1994)
- (IB 46) West Coast Brigade at Halmstad, Halland County (1949–1964)
- (IB 46) Halland Brigade at Halmstad, Halland County (1964–1994)
- (IB 47) Gothenburg Brigade at Uddevalla, Västra Götaland County (1949–1992)
- (IB 50) Lappland Brigade at Umeå, Västerbotten County (1949–1965)
- (IB 51) Ångermanland Brigade at Sollefteå, Västernorrland County (1949–1972)

The standard abbreviation for infantry brigades, "IB" stands for Infanteribrigad.

== Armoured ==
- (PB 5) Älvsborg Brigade at Borås, Västra Götaland County (1949–1963)
- (PB 6) Blue Brigade at Enköping, Uppsala County (1949–1979)
- (PB 7) Malmö Brigade at Ystad, Skåne County (1949–1994)
- (PB 8) Göinge Brigade at Hässleholm, Skåne County (1949–1994)
- (PB 8) Scanian Dragoon Brigade at Hässleholm, Skåne County (1994–1997)
- (PB 9) Skaraborg Brigade at Skövde, Västra Götaland County (1949–1997)
- (PB 10) Södermanland Brigade at Strängnäs, Södermanland County (1963–1974)
- (PB 18) Gotland Brigade at Visby, Gotland County (1966–1994)
- (PB 26) Kristianstad Brigade at Kristianstad, Skåne County (1963–1994)

The standard abbreviation for armoured brigades, "PB" stands for Pansarbrigad.

== Mechanised ==
Principal brigade formation of the Swedish Army since the mid-1990s.

- (MekB 4) **Skaraborg Brigade** at Skövde, Västra Götaland County (2022–present)
- (MekB 7) **South Skåne Brigade** at Revingeby, Skåne County (2022–present)
- (MekB 8) Scanian Dragoon Brigade at Hässleholm, Skåne County (1997–2000)
- (MekB 9) Skaraborg Brigade at Skövde, Västra Götaland County (1998–2000)
- (MekB 10) Södermanland Brigade at Strängnäs, Södermanland County (1982–2000)
- (MekB 18) Gotland Brigade at Visby, Gotland County (1994–2000)
- (MekB 19) Norrbotten Brigade at Boden, Norrbotten County (1994–2000)

The standard abbreviation for mechanised brigades, "MekB" stands for Mekaniserad Brigad.

== Arctic ==
Strategic formations for the defense of Norrland.

- (NB 5) Ranger Brigade at Östersund, Jämtland County (1994–2000)
- (NB 13) Dalarna Brigade at Falun, Dalarna County (1986–2000)
- (NB 19) Norrbotten Brigade at Boden, Norrbotten County (1964–1994)
- (NB 20) Västerbotten Brigade at Umeå, Västerbotten County (1964–1972)
- (NB 20) Lappland Brigade at Umeå, Västerbotten County (1994–1997)
- (NB 21) Ångermanland Brigade at Sollefteå, Västernorrland County (1994–2000)
- (NB 35) Jämtland Brigade at Östersund, Jämtland County (1963–1988)
- (NB 35) Ranger Brigade at Östersund, Jämtland County (1988–1994)
- (NB 50) Lappland Brigade at Umeå, Västerbotten County (1965–1994)
- (NB 51) Ångermanland Brigade at Sollefteå, Västernorrland County (1972–1994)

The standard abbreviation for arctic brigades, "NB" stands for Norrlandsbrigad.

== Arctic mechanised ==
Mechanised formation specialised in arctic warfare.

- (NMekB 19) **Norrbotten Brigade** at Boden, Norrbotten County (2022–present)

The standard abbreviation for arctic mechanised brigades, "NMekB" stands for Norrlandsmekaniserad Brigad.

== See also ==
- Military district (Sweden)
- List of Swedish defence districts
- List of Swedish regiments

== Sources ==
- Körlof, Björn (19 Oct 2020). "Nya regementen, nya uppgifter militärt och civilt!". kkrva.se (in Swedish). Royal Swedish Academy of War Sciences.
- Lindberg, Helena; Sohlman, Sascha (2021). Att bygga nationell försvarsförmåga – statens arbete med att stärka arméstridskrafterna (PDF) (Report) (in Swedish). Stockholm: Swedish National Audit Office. ISBN 978-91-7086-606-7.
- B, Mats (7 Oct 2021). "Svenska arméns brigader". kalla-kriget.se (in Swedish).
- Johansson, Robert (7 Oct 2024). "Regementena är döda – leve krigsförbanden!". militardebatt.com (in Swedish).
