= Tony Stigsson =

Swedish Army officer

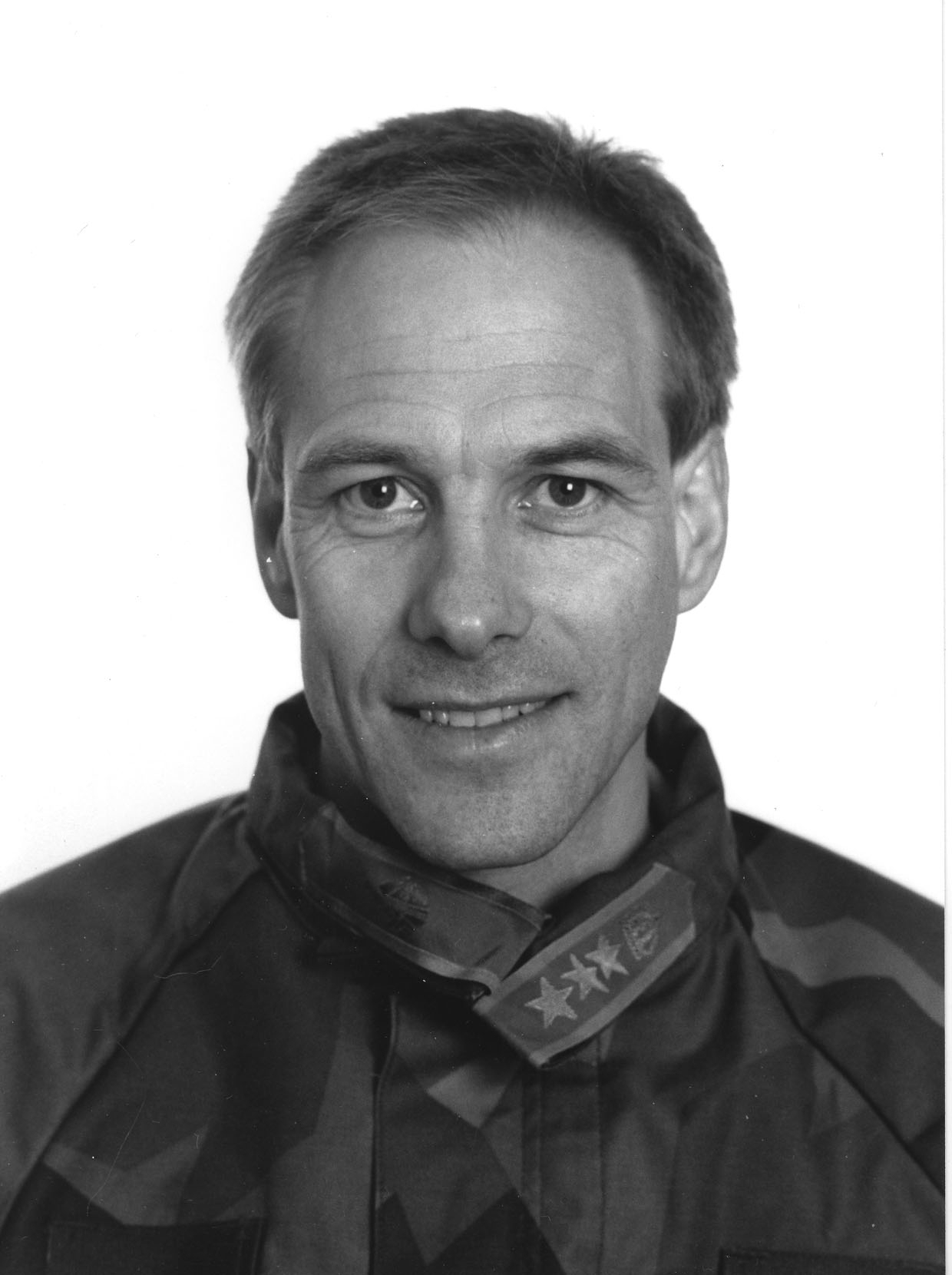
- Stigsson as colonel.
- Born: Stig Kent Tony Stigsson; 6 November 1956 (age 70); Lönsboda, Sweden
- Military career
- Allegiance: Sweden
- Branch: Swedish Army
- Service years: 1978–2005
- Rank: Major general
- Unit: UNIFIL (1992-93)
- Commands: Skaraborg Brigade; Skaraborg Regiment and Skaraborg Brigade; Joint Operations Command; Joint Forces Command

Major General Stig Kent Tony Stigsson (born 6 November 1956) is a former Swedish Army officer, former head of the Joint Forces Command of the Swedish Armed Forces. Until 2005, Stigsson was also president of the Swedish Wrestling Federation. Stigsson was arrested in early 2005 on suspicion of rape, spousal abuse and mishandling of top secret classified documents. He was convicted of spousal abuse on 6 July 2005 and sentenced to 6 months of prison for two counts of assault, which was later reduced to three months on appeal. Stigsson was relieved of all duties at the Swedish Armed Forces, while the government disciplinary board (Statens ansvarsnämnd) was reviewing whether Stigsson was to be dismissed from the Swedish Armed Forces. While the above were the main charges, an incriminating factor in the case from the start has been Stigsson's interest in sado-masochistic sex practices which, together with his careless handling of secret documents, were considered a clear security risk by investigators. In May 2008, Stigsson was sentenced to three months in prison and was fired from the Swedish Armed Forces.

== Early life ==
Stigsson was born in Lönsboda, Sweden and grew up in a working-class home. Stigsson began his wrestling career in Lönsboda, and later competed for BK Ore in Vinslöv. In 1975 he did his military service at the North Scanian Regiment (P 6) in Kristianstad. When living in Kristianstad, he was for a period the chairman of Willands Rider Association.

== Career ==
=== Military career ===
After being commissioned as an officer, Stigsson serve in Skaraborg Regiment. From 1992 to 1993, Stigsson served as acting commander of the Swedish Battalion in Lebanon, part of the United Nations Interim Force in Lebanon (UNIFIL). In 1995 he was appointed commanding officer of the Skaraborg Brigade (PB 9) (later renamed) Skaraborg Regiment and Skaraborg Brigade (MekB 9). Stigsson left the position in 1999 and was appointed head of the Training Department in the General Training and Management Directorate (Grundorganisationsledningen) at the Swedish Armed Forces Headquarters in Stockholm. A year later he was appointed head of the Joint Operations Command (Operationsledningen, OPL).

Stigsson served as the Viking 03 Exercise Director in 2003. Stigsson served as acting head of the Joint Forces Command (OPIL) at the Swedish Armed Forces Headquarters until 1 September 2004 when he took in charge of the command. Stigsson has also served as Sweden's representative in the Challenges of Peace Operations, an international association for the exchange of experience in peace operations.

=== Security risk ===
According to the TV4 Kalla Fakta documentary, major general Stigsson took serious security risks long before he was arrested for assaulting his wife. When searched by police, he was found to be in possession of very explicit pornographic material, which, it is alleged, made him vulnerable to blackmail. The TV4 investigation contends that a combination of the senior officer's sexual behaviour and his handling of extremely sensitive military documents constituted a major national security risk. When Stigsson was arrested in March 2005, police found explicit, and very deviant, pornographic material in the major general's uniform pockets as well as in his places of residence. The risk of blackmail was further increased by the fact that Stigsson made contact with unknown persons on the Internet, with the intention of meeting them for group sex at swingers' clubs. According to TV4, whose reporters have had access to the full police investigation, the major general was aware of the risks. In an e-mail sent to a woman from his work address, he writes that he wanted to "test the limits", knowing that he was "always running the risk of finding myself in a blackmail situation".

In June 2006, chief prosecutor Ulf Forsberg in Uppsala decided not to press charges with Stigsson over negligence with regard to secret documents, a crime that is considered a threat to national security. Police found 300 documents in Stigsson's home, out of which 70 were classified, but Forsberg was not able to prove that any of the information contained in the documents had been disclosed to a third party. Among the copied documents found scattered around various locations in Stigsson's house were some of the most secret and sensitive in the military's possession. These included, for instance, notes and plans of secret mountain hideouts from which Sweden would be governed in wartime, as well as documents concerning the outcome of successful intelligence operations. Supreme Commander Håkan Syrén has requested Stigsson's dismissal. In May 2008, the National Disciplinary Offence Board reached the same decision; Stigsson has appealed it. Since 2005 he has had no active involvement with the military. Syrén, previously head of the Swedish Military Intelligence and Security Service, also pointed out that the Swedish Armed Forces have recently introduced more rigorous background checks for those seeking high-level military posts.

In May 2008, Stigsson was sentenced to three months in prison and was fired from the Swedish Armed Forces.

== Personal life ==
In 1973 or May 1982, Stigsson married the woman who later would report him to the police. They divorced in 2004. They had four children and lived from 1995 on a horse farm in Töreboda. On 14 May 2010, Stigsson married his ex-wife's first lawyer.

Stigsson became chairman of the Swedish Wrestling Federation in 2001.

== Dates of rank ==
- 1978 – Lieutenant
- 1981 – Captain
- 1985 – Major
- 1994 – Lieutenant colonel
- 1996 – Colonel
- 1999 – Senior colonel
- 2000 – Major general

== Honours ==
- Member of the Royal Swedish Academy of War Sciences (2001)

Military offices
Preceded by Jan Jonsson	Joint Forces Command; 2004–2005	Succeeded by None
Sporting positions
Preceded by Britt Sohlberg	Chairman of the Swedish Wrestling Federation; 2001–2005	Succeeded by ?
