= South Skåne Brigade =

Active Swedish Army formation

- Södra skånska brigaden
- Active: 1943–2000; 2022–present
- Country: Sweden
- Branch: Swedish Army
- Part of: South Skåne Regiment (peacetime); 1st Division (wartime)
- Headquarters: Revinge Garrison
- Mottos: Slå snabbt - slå hårt ("Hit fast - hit hard")
- Beret colour: Black
- March: "Souvenir-marsch"
- Mascot: Twin-stemmed oak

Commanders
- Commander: Col Annelie Olausson
- Staff Chief: LtCol Martin Folestam

The South Skåne Brigade, (Note: Swedish: Södra skånska brigaden, pronounced [ˌsøːdra ˌskoːnska brɪˈgɑːdɛn]) also known as the 7th Mechanised Brigade (Note: Swedish: 7. mekaniserade brigaden, pronounced [ˌɧɵnːdɛ mɛkanɪˈseːradɛ brɪˈgɑːdɛn]) (MekB 7), is a mechanised brigade of the Swedish Army based in Skåne County. It has been active since 2022, having previously served between 1943 and 2000. It is headquartered at Revinge Garrison.

== History ==
The brigade was established in 1943 as one of the first army brigades and served as the sole brigade under the command of the South Scanian Infantry Regiment.

In 1949, it received a sister brigade when the Skåne Brigade (IB 37) was established under the same command. However, this arrangement lasted only eight years before the Skåne Brigade was transferred to the North Scanian Infantry Regiment, once again leaving the South Skåne Brigade as the sole brigade under its regiment.

The unit was disbanded as a result of the disarmament policies set forward in the Defence Act of 2000. In 2022, following the Defence Act of 2020, the South Skåne Brigade would be re-established from scratch.

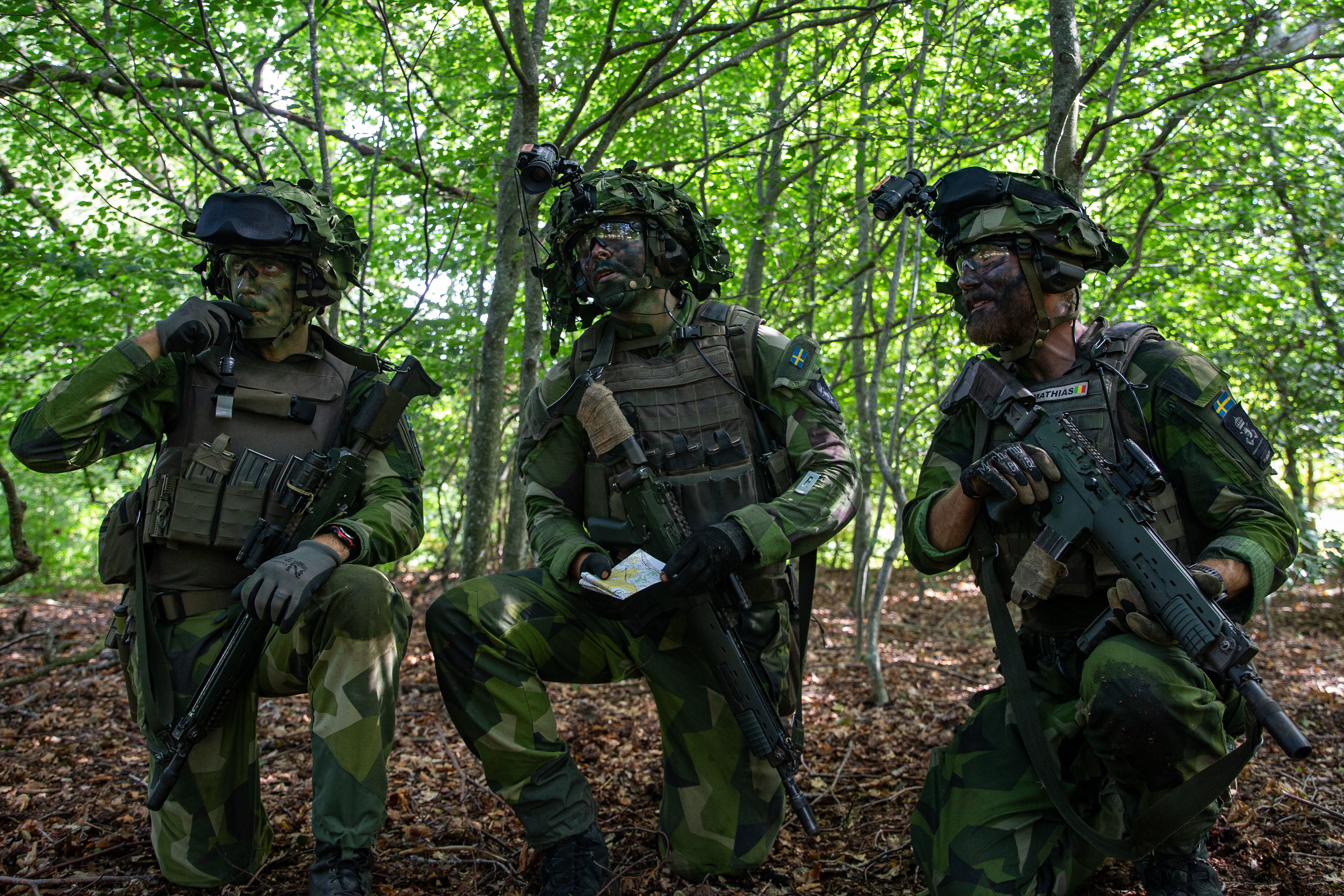
Dismounted infantry outside of Kristianstad, 2022.

=== Organisation ===
As of 2022, the planned wartime organisation of the South Skåne Brigade at full operational capacity is as follows:

- 7th Mechanised Brigade
  - 7th Brigade Staff
    - 7th Brigade Headquarters Company
    - 7th Brigade Reconnaissance Company
    - 7th Brigade Signals Company
    - 7th Brigade Air Defence Company
  - 71st Mechanised Battalion
  - 72nd Mechanised Battalion
  - 73rd Mechanised Battalion
  - 7th Brigade Support Battalion
  - 7th Brigade Engineer Battalion
  - 7th Brigade Artillery Battalion
  - 7th Tank Transport Company

== Traditions ==
As a mechanised brigade, the standard beret colour is black, in accordance with the traditions of the Swedish Armoured Troops.

The twin-stemmed oak tree serves as the mascot of both the brigade and the South Skåne Regiment.

=== March ===
The 1943 instrumental "Souvenir-marsch" by Friedrich Zikoff, known in ceremonial contexts as "Södra skånska infanteriregementets marsch", has served as the brigade's established march since 13 June 1996, having been in use inofficially since 1994.

=== Heraldry ===
The brigade shares its heraldry with the South Skåne Regiment and the Scanian Group of the Home Guard.

Blazon of the brigade's coat of arms is as follows:

Or, the provincial badge of Skåne, an erazed head of a griffin gules, with open crown and arms azure. The shield surmounted two arms in fess, embowed and vambraced, the hands holding swords in saltire, or.

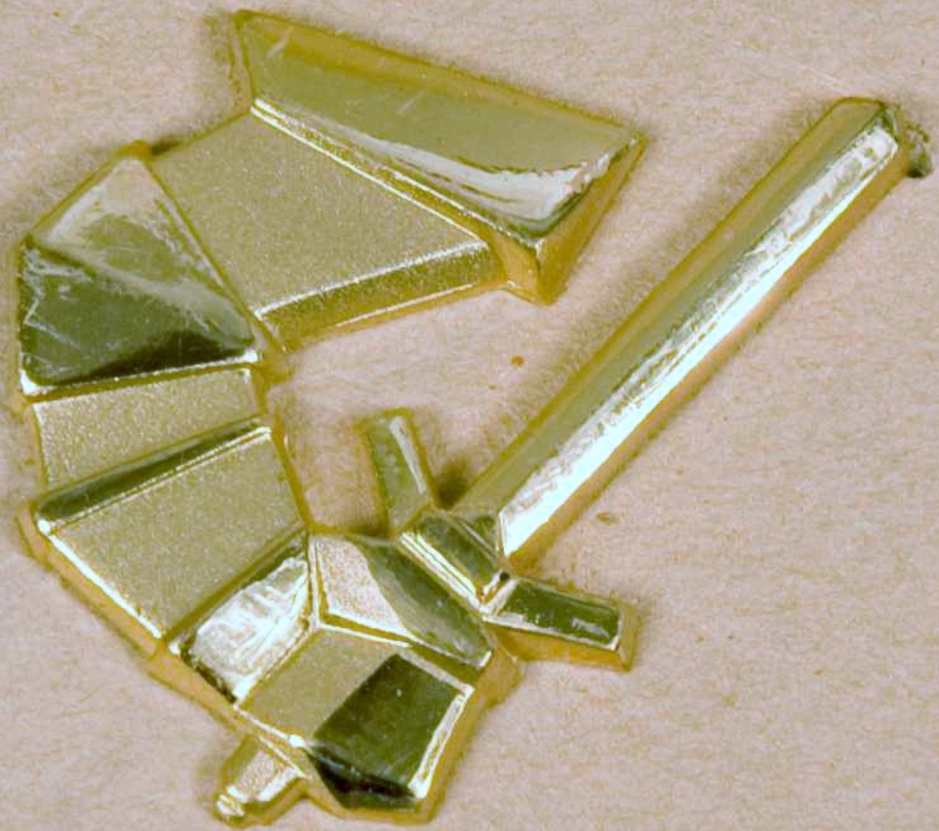
Branch insignia

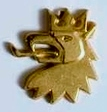
Unit insignia

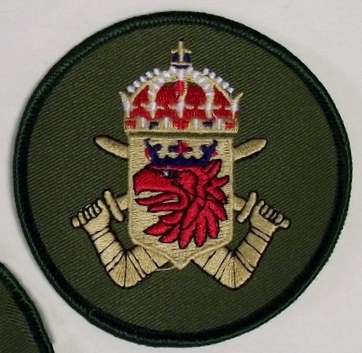
Sleeve insignia

== Commanders ==
- 1943–1990: ?
- 1990–1991: LtCol Gunnar Magnusson
- 1991–1994: Col Mats Welff
- 1994–1998: Col Göran Arlefalk
- 1998–2000: Col Leif Nilsson
- 2000–2021: Inactive
- 2022–2025: Col Lennart Widerström
- 2025–present: Col Annelie Olausson

== Attributes ==
Attributes and locations of the South Skåne Brigade
Name	Translation	From	To
7. motorbrigaden	7th Motorised Brigade	1943	30 September 1949
Malmöbrigaden	Malmö Brigade	1 October 1949	30 June 1994
Södra Skånska Brigaden	South Skåne Brigade	1 July 1994	31 December 1997
Södra Skånska regementet och Södra Skånska Brigaden	South Skåne Regiment and South Skåne Brigade	1 January 1998	30 June 2000
Södra Skånska Brigaden	South Skåne Brigade	1 January 2022	–
Designation		From	To
7. motorbrig		1943	30 September 1949
PB 7		1 October 1949	30 June 1994
MekB 7		1 July 1994	30 June 2000
MekB 7		1 January 2022	–
Location		From	To
Ystad Garrison		1943	26 May 1982
Revinge Garrison		10 June 1982	30 June 2000
Revinge Garrison		1 January 2022	–

== See also ==
- List of Swedish Army brigades

== Sources ==
- Sandberg, Bo (2007). Försvarets marscher och signaler förr och nu: marscher antagna av svenska militära förband, skolor och staber samt igenkännings-, tjänstgörings- och exercissignaler (in Swedish) (New ed.). Stockholm: Militärmusiksamfundet med Svenskt marscharkiv. ISBN 978-91-631-8699-8. SELIBR 10413065.
- Riksdagen (15 October 2020). "Totalförsvaret 2021–2025 (Proposition 2020/21:30)". riksdagen.se (in Swedish).
- Riksdagen (25 November 1999). "Det nya försvaret (Proposition 1999/2000:30)". riksdagen.se (in Swedish).
- Försvarsmakten (2022). "Planerad utveckling av krigsorganisationen 2021-2030" [Planned development of the war organization 2021-2030] (PDF). forsvarsmakten.se (in Swedish). Archived from the original (PDF) on 10 March 2022.
- Försvarsmakten (17 December 1999). "MekB 7 Historia". mekb7.mil.se (in Swedish). Archived from the original on 5 June 2000.
- Försvarsmakten (2015). "Uniformsbestämmelser 2015" (PDF). Reglemente (in Swedish). Stockholm: Swedish Armed Forces.
- Gunhardson, Anneli (2015). "Pansarterrängbil 360 – snabb trupptransport med hög skyddsnivå" (PDF). Teknisk information för försvarsmaterieltjänst (in Swedish) (3). Linköping.
- SMDB (2025). "Kungl. Södra skånska infanterireg:s paradmarsch (Zikoff) ; Kungl. Norra skånska infanterireg:s paradmarsch (Eisengräber)". Svensk mediedatabas (in Swedish).
- Braunstein, Christian (2006). Heraldiska vapen inom det svenska försvaret (PDF) (in Swedish). Stockholm: Statens försvarshistoriska museer. ISBN 91-971584-9-6. SELIBR 10099224. Archived from the original (PDF) on 25 November 2018.
