= Life Guards Brigade =

Active Swedish Army formation

Coordinates: 59°30′54″N 17°46′44″E

- Livgardesbrigaden
- Active: 1949–2000; 2024–present
- Country: Sweden
- Branch: Swedish Army
- Part of: Life Guards (peacetime); 1st Division (wartime)
- Headquarters: Kungsängen Garrison
- Beret colour: Black
- March: "Kungl. Svea livgardes marsch"

Commanders
- Commander: Col Martin Johansson

The Life Guards Brigade, (Note: Swedish: Livgardesbrigaden, pronounced [ˈlɪvɡɑːrdəsˌbrɪˈɡaːdɛn]) also known as the 1st Infantry Brigade (Note: Swedish: 1. infanteribrigaden, pronounced [ˈfœʂːta ɪnfanˈtɛːriˌbrɪˈɡaːdɛn]) (IB 1), is a reduced infantry brigade of the Swedish Army based in Stockholm County. It has been active since 2024, having previously served between 1949 and 2000. The brigade is headquartered at Kungsängen Garrison.

== History ==
The brigade was established in 1949 as the peacetime subordinate of the Uppland Regiment under the name Uppland Brigade, with Roslagen as its area of responsibility. However in 1957, the Uppland Regiment was disbanded, and the brigade was transferred and would henceforth act as the peacetime subordinate to the Svea Life Guards instead.

In the Defence Act of 2000, the government proposed that the army undergo further post–Cold War downsizing and that many brigades, including the Life Guards Brigade, be disbanded.

Upon the re-establishment of the brigade in 2024, its wartime organisation would be within the 1st Division along with the rest of the Swedish Army's active brigades.

The brigade would be unique among all other brigades and units within the Swedish Army upon its establishment. It would hold a permanent responsibility for defending Stockholm, and would be the only reduced infantry brigade, using only armoured personnel carriers instead of the standard Strf 90 and Strv 122.

=== Organisation ===
As of 2022, the planned wartime organisation of the Life Guards Brigade at full operational capacity is as follows, with full capability expected to be reached no sooner than 2029:

- 1st Infantry Brigade
  - 1st Brigade Staff
    - 1st Headquarters Company
    - 1st Air Defence Company
  - King's Guards Battalion
  - 1st Motorised Infantry Battalion
  - 2nd Motorised Infantry Battalion
  - 1st Artillery Company

== Traditions ==
In line with the standard beret colour of Swedish light infantry, black is the most common beret colour within the brigade.

Adopted in 1994, the brigade march is "Kungl. Svea livgardes marsch" by Wilhelm Körner.

== Commanders ==
The commanders of the brigade throughout its history are as follows:

- 1949–1988: ?
- 1988–1993: Col Johan Hederstedt
- 1993–1997: Col Kim Åkerman
- 1997–1000: Col Sverker Göranson
- 2000–2024: Inactive
- 2024–present: Col Martin Johansson

== Attributes ==
Attributes and locations of the Life Guards Brigade
Name	Translation	From	To
Upplandsbrigaden	Uppland Brigade	1 October 1949	30 June 1985
Gula brigaden	Yellow Brigade	1 July 1985	30 June 1994
Livgardesbrigaden	Life Guards Brigade	30 July 1994	30 June 2000
Livgardesbrigaden	Life Guards Brigade	26 August 2024	–
Designation		From	To
IB 28		1 October 1949	31 March 1957
IB 38		1 April 1957	30 June 1985
IB 1		1 July 1985	30 June 2000
IB 1		26 August 2024	–
Location		From	To
Uppsala Garrison		1 October 1949	31 March 1957
Sörentorp Garrison		1 April 1957	30 June 1970
Kungsängen Garrison		1 July 1970	30 June 2000
Kungsängen Garrison		26 August 2024	–

== See also ==
- List of Swedish Army brigades

== Sources ==
- Riksdagen (25 November 1999). "Det nya försvaret (Proposition 1999/2000:30)". riksdagen.se (in Swedish).
- Braunstein, Christian (2003). Sveriges arméförband under 1900-talet. Skrift / Statens försvarshistoriska museer, 1101-7023; 5 (in Swedish). Stockholm: Statens försvarshistoriska museer. ISBN 91-971584-4-5. SELIBR 8902928.
- Sandberg, Bo (2007). Försvarets marscher och signaler förr och nu: marscher antagna av svenska militära förband, skolor och staber samt igenkännings-, tjänstgörings- och exercissignaler (in Swedish) (New ed.). Stockholm: Militärmusiksamfundet med Svenskt marscharkiv. ISBN 978-91-631-8699-8. SELIBR 10413065.
- Försvarsmakten (2015). "Uniformsbestämmelser 2015" (PDF). Reglemente (in Swedish). Stockholm: Swedish Armed Forces.
- Försvarsmakten (2022). "Planerad utveckling av krigsorganisationen 2021-2030" [Planned development of the war organization 2021-2030] (PDF). forsvarsmakten.se (in Swedish). Archived from the original (PDF) on 10 March 2022.
- Johansson, Alf (29 September 2022). "Armén skapar divisionsförmåga". forsvarsmakten.se (in Swedish).
- Försvarsmakten (11 July 2024). "Livgardesbrigaden IB 1". forsvarsmakten.se (in Swedish).
- Försvarsmakten (27 January 2025). "Stockholmsbrigad tar form". forsvarsmakten.se (in Swedish).
