= 1st Division (Sweden) =

Active Swedish Army formation

Coordinates: 58°22′46″N 13°50′41″E

- 1. Divisionen
- Active: 2000–2004; 2022–present
- Country: Sweden
- Branch: Swedish Army
- Part of: Army Staff
- Headquarters: Skövde Garrison
- March: "Svensk lösen"

Commanders
- Commander: BGen Michael Carlén

Insignia
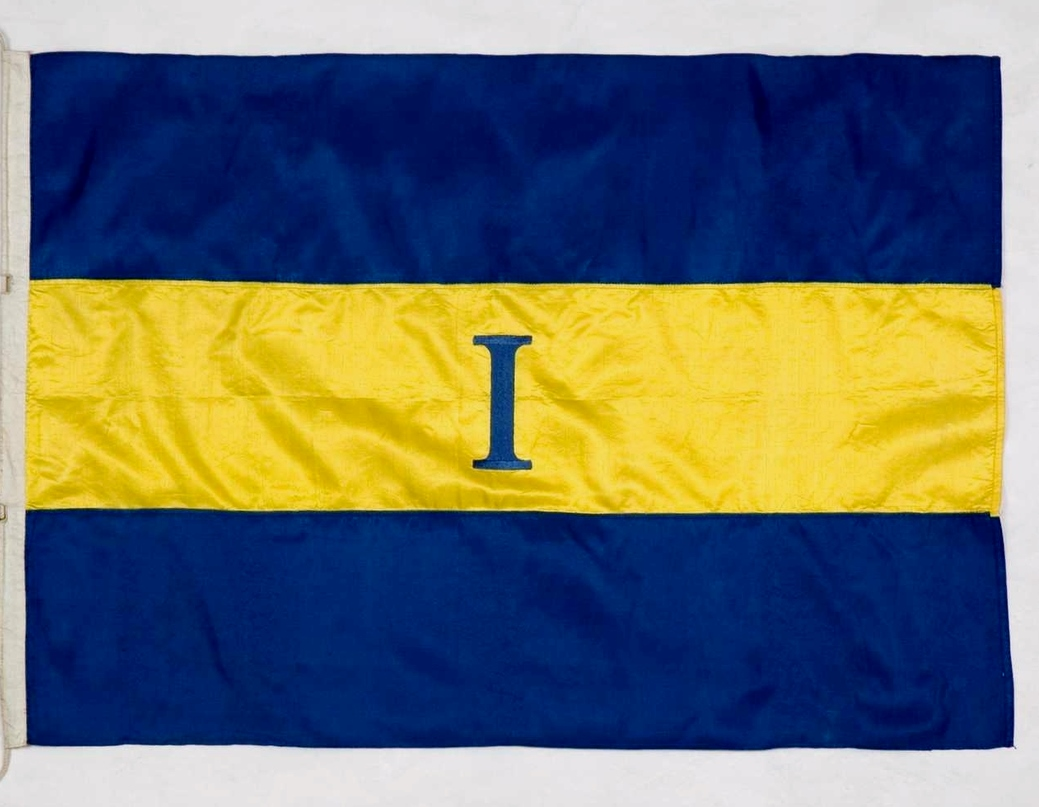
- Command flag

The 1st Division (Note: Swedish: 1. Divisionen, pronounced [ˈfœʂta dɪviˈɧuːnən]) (1. div) is a mechanised division of the Swedish Army based in Västra Götaland County. It has been active since 2022, having previously served between 2000 and 2004. It is headquartered at Skövde Garrison.

== History ==
In the Defence Act of 2000, the government proposed that the three remaining army divisions, after post–Cold War downsizing, be consolidated into a single, reinforced division to reduce bureaucracy within the army. The Swedish Parliament approved the proposal, leading to the creation of the 1st Mechanised Division as the successor to the Upper Northern Army Division, the Eastern Army Division, and the Southern Army Division.

The new division lasted four years. In the Defence Act of 2004, the government proposed that the division be disbanded and its units be placed directly under the Joint Forces Command, as maintaining a division-sized unit was no longer considered suitable for the army's increasing focus on international operations. The division was disbanded that same year.

Following the Defence Act of 2020, the 1st Division was officially re-established in 2022 to command the army's expanding brigades.

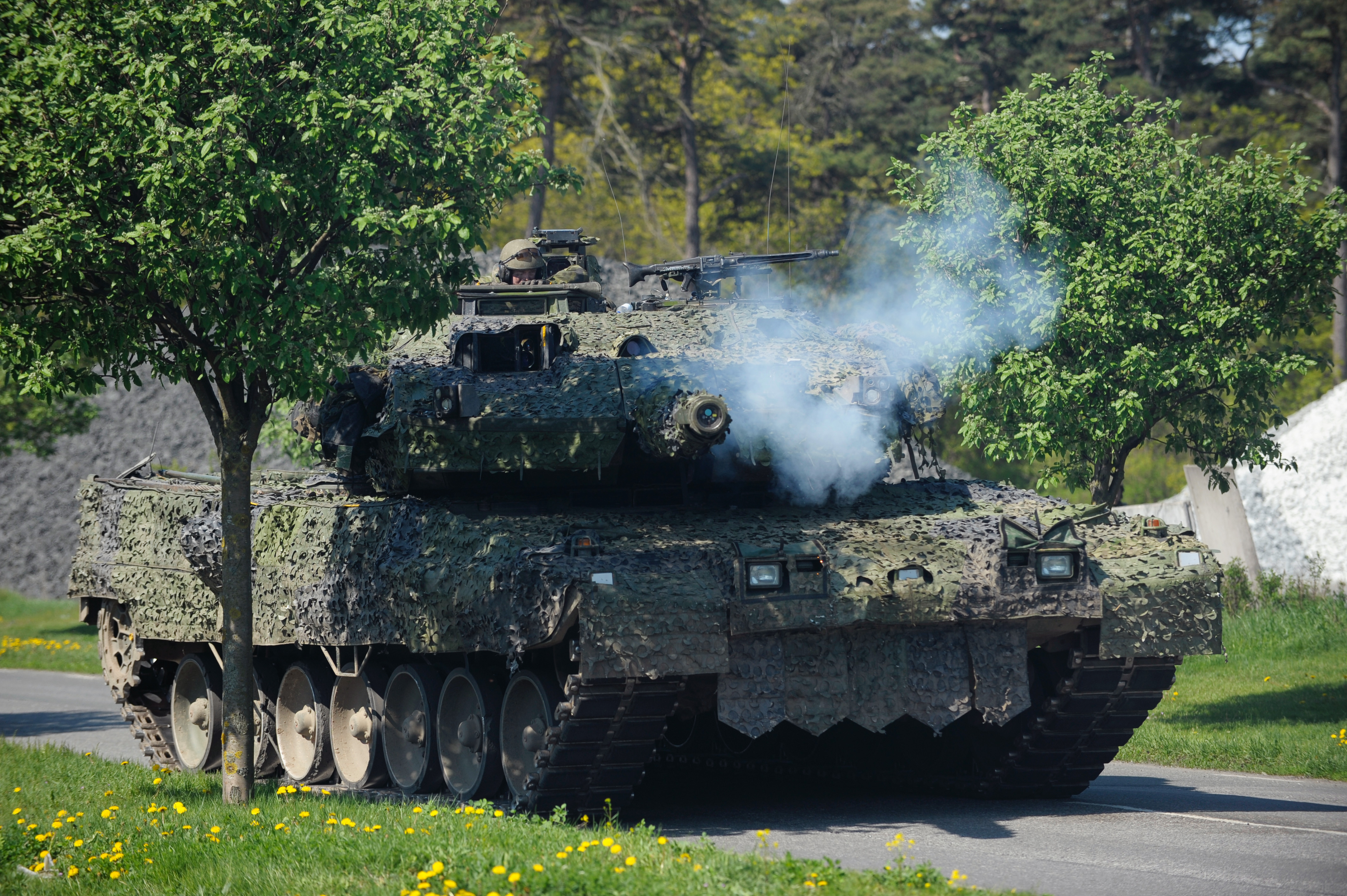
Stridsvagn 122 of the 7th Mechanised Brigade

=== Organisation ===
The division serves as the army's higher tactical command, coordinating multiple brigades in large-scale operations and aligning with NATO operational standards.

As of 2022, the planned operational organisation of the 1st Division, when at full operational capacity, is as follows:

- 1st Division
  - 1st Division Staff
    - 1st Division Staff Battalion
    - 1st Division Electronic Warfare Battalion
    - 1st Division Support Battalion
    - 1st Division Engineer Battalion
  - 1st Infantry Brigade
  - 4th Mechanised Brigade
  - 7th Mechanised Brigade
  - 19th Arctic Mechanised Brigade

This organisation is planned to expand between 2025 and 2035 by adding supporting artillery, reconnaissance, and signal units, with full combat readiness targeted for 2030. Designed for rapid deployment, the division staff comprises 151 personnel as of 2024.

== Traditions ==
=== Command flag ===
The division's command flag is inherited from the 1st Army Division. The formal description of the flag is as follows: (Note: Swedish: På blå duk en gul bjälke belagd med den romerska siffran I i blått.)

On a blue cloth, a yellow fess charged with a blue Roman numeral I.

=== March ===
The division's march, inherited from the Middle Army Division and officially designated on 27 November 2002, is "Svensk lösen" by Hjalmar Modéer.

== Commanders ==
- 2000–2004: BGen Håkan Espmark
- 2004–2022: Inactive
- 2022–2025: BGen Rickard Johansson
- 2025–present: BGen Michael Carlén

== Attributes ==
Attributes and locations of the 1st Division
Name	Translation	From	To
1. mekaniserade divisionen	1st Mechanised Division	1 July 2000	31 December 2004
1. divisionen	1st Division	1 September 2022	–
Designation		From	To
1. mekdiv		1 July 2000	31 December 2004
1. div		1 September 2022	–
Location		From	To
Enköping Garrison		1 July 2000	31 December 2003
Uppsala Garrison		1 January 2004	31 December 2004
Skövde Garrison		1 September 2022	–

== Sources ==
- Riksdagen (25 November 1999). "Det nya försvaret (Proposition 1999/2000:30)". riksdagen.se (in Swedish).
- Braunstein, Christian (2004). Svenska försvarsmaktens fälttecken efter millennieskiftet (PDF). 7 (in Swedish). Stockholm: Swedish National Maritime, Transport and Military Museums. ISBN 91-971584-7-X. ISSN 1101-7023.
- Riksdagen (24 September 2004). "Vårt framtida försvar (Proposition 2004/05:5)". riksdagen.se (in Swedish).
- Sandberg, Bo (2007). Försvarets marscher och signaler förr och nu: marscher antagna av svenska militära förband, skolor och staber samt igenkännings-, tjänstgörings- och exercissignaler (in Swedish). Sweden: Militärmusiksamfundet med Svenskt Marscharkiv. ISBN 978-91-631-8699-8.
- Riksdagen (15 October 2020). "Totalförsvaret 2021–2025 (Proposition 2020/21:30)". riksdagen.se (in Swedish).
- Försvarsmakten (2022). "Planerad utveckling av krigsorganisationen 2021-2030" [Planned development of the war organization 2021-2030] (PDF). forsvarsmakten.se (in Swedish). Archived from the original (PDF) on 10 March 2022.
- Johansson, Alf (29 September 2022). "Armén skapar divisionsförmåga". forsvarsmakten.se (in Swedish).
- Wetterberg, Niclas (2023). Ekroth, Stefan; Ljungqvist, Isabelle (eds.). "Trängaren — tidningen för trängregementets och kunglig göta trängregementes kamratförening" (PDF). Trängaren (in Swedish).
- Owetz, Josefine (18 May 2023). "Stora kliv framåt för nya divisionsstaben under Aurora 23". Officerstidningen.
- Kvarnlöf, Karin (10 May 2024). "Svenska och amerikanska divisioner stärker varandra". forsvarsmakten.se (in Swedish).
- Försvarsmakten (5 June 2024). "Krigsorganisationens utveckling 2025-2035" (PDF). forsvarsmakten.se (in Swedish).
- Wallin, Mathias (26 September 2025). "Den svenska armén: nyckeln i det nordiska försvaret". kkrva.se (in Swedish). Royal Swedish Academy of War Sciences.
- Försvarsmakten (22 October 2025). "Armén förbereder sig för huvuduppgiften att försvara Natos östra flank". forsvarsmakten.se (in Swedish).
