= Revinge Church =

- Revinge kyrka
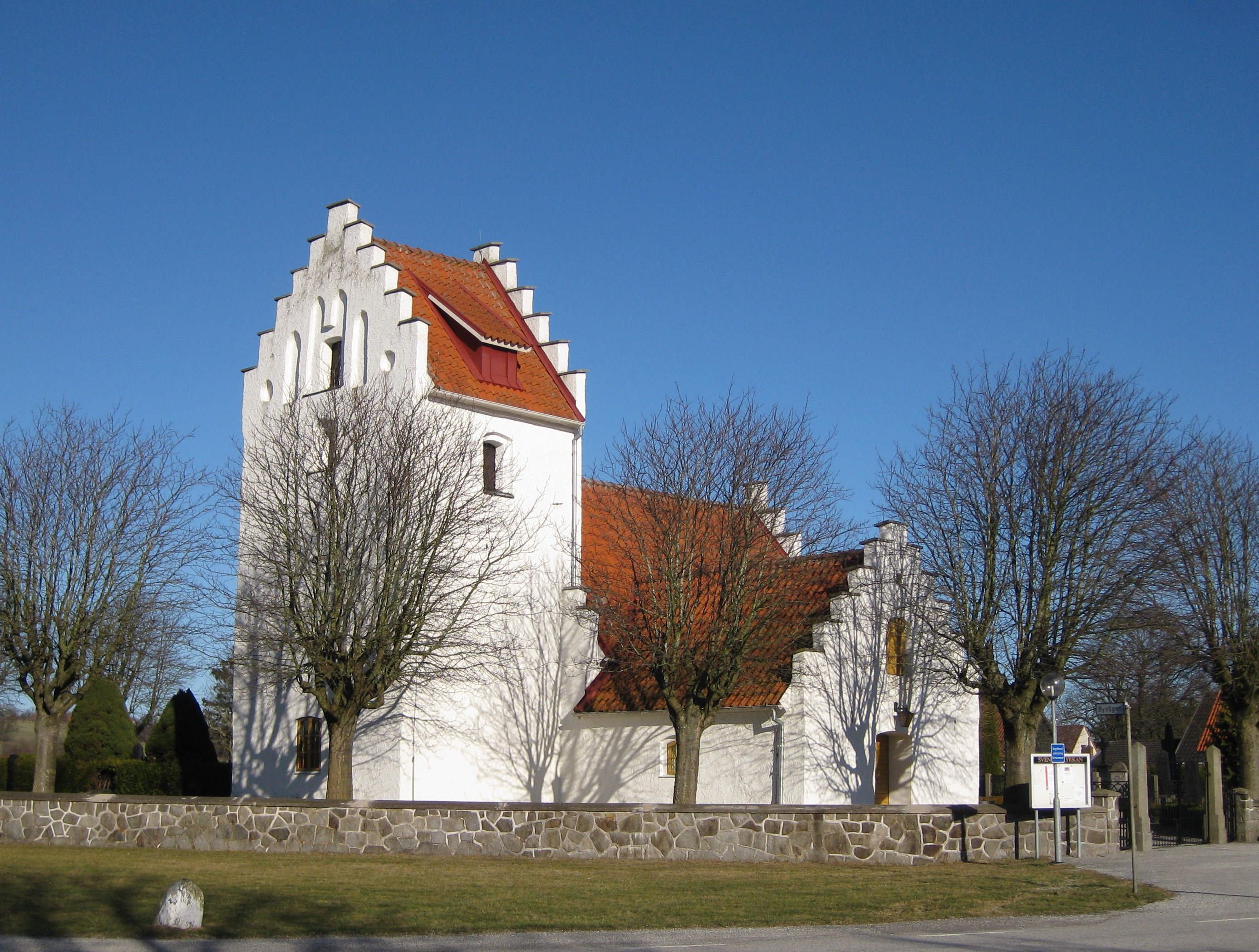
- Revinge Church

- Location within Skåne Location within Sweden Location within Europe
- 55°43′36″N 13°27′44″E
- Country: Sweden
- Denomination: Church of Sweden

Revinge Church (Swedish: Revinge kyrka) is a medieval church in Revinge, Lund Municipality in the province of Skåne, Sweden.

== History and architecture ==
The church dates from the 13th century and originally only consisted of a simple nave. The tower was probably added in the 14th century. A church porch was constructed in the 15th century. In the same century, the previous ceiling was replaced by the currently visible vaults. During the 19th century, the windows were enlarged and the stepped gables added to the tower, church porch and gables. A major renovation was carried out in 1950–1951, led by architect Eiler Græbe. The oldest of the church furnishings is the pulpit, which dates from the 17th century. The altarpiece is from 1906 and the current baptismal font was installed in 1954.
