= Skaraborg Brigade =

Active Swedish Army formation

- Skaraborgsbrigaden
- Active: 1943–2000; 2022–present
- Country: Sweden
- Branch: Swedish Army
- Size: Brigade
- Part of: Skaraborg Regiment (peacetime); 1st Division (wartime)
- Headquarters: Skövde Garrison
- Mottos: Arvet förpliktar ("The heritage obligates")
- Beret colour: Black
- March: "Geschwindmarsch" (Note: Composed by Carl August Herrman. The march was adopted in 1994 and established on 13 June 1996.)
- Battle honours: Varberg (1565); Breitenfeld (1631); Lützen (1632); Warszawa (1656); Lund (1676); Landskrona (1677); Narva (1700); Malatitze (1708)

Commanders
- Commander: LtCol Peter Andersson
- Staff Chief: LtCol Tobias Hagstedt

The Skaraborg Brigade (Swedish: Skaraborgsbrigaden), also known as the 4th Mechanised Brigade (MekB 4), is a mechanised brigade of the Swedish Army located in Västra Götaland County. It has been active since 2022, having previously served between 1942 and 2000. It is headquartered at Skövde Garrison.

== History ==
The brigade was established in 1943 under the name of the 9th Armoured Brigade and was one of the very first Swedish army brigades.

In the Defence Act of 1992, the government proposed that the wartime organisation should reflect the peacetime organisation. As a result, in 1994, the Skaraborg Brigade was cadre-organised within the Southern Military District but wartime-organised within the Western Army Division. The division's wartime organisation was reorganised once again in 1996, becoming subordinate to the Southern Army Division.

The unit was disbanded as a result of the disarmament policies set forward in the Defence Act of 2000. In 2021, following the Defence Act of 2020, which significantly reorganised the army, the 2nd Brigade was disbanded, and its equipment was transferred to the Skaraborg Brigade, which was set to be re-established in 2022.

Upon the re-establishment of the brigade, its wartime organisation would be within the 1st Division along with the rest of the Swedish Army's active brigades.

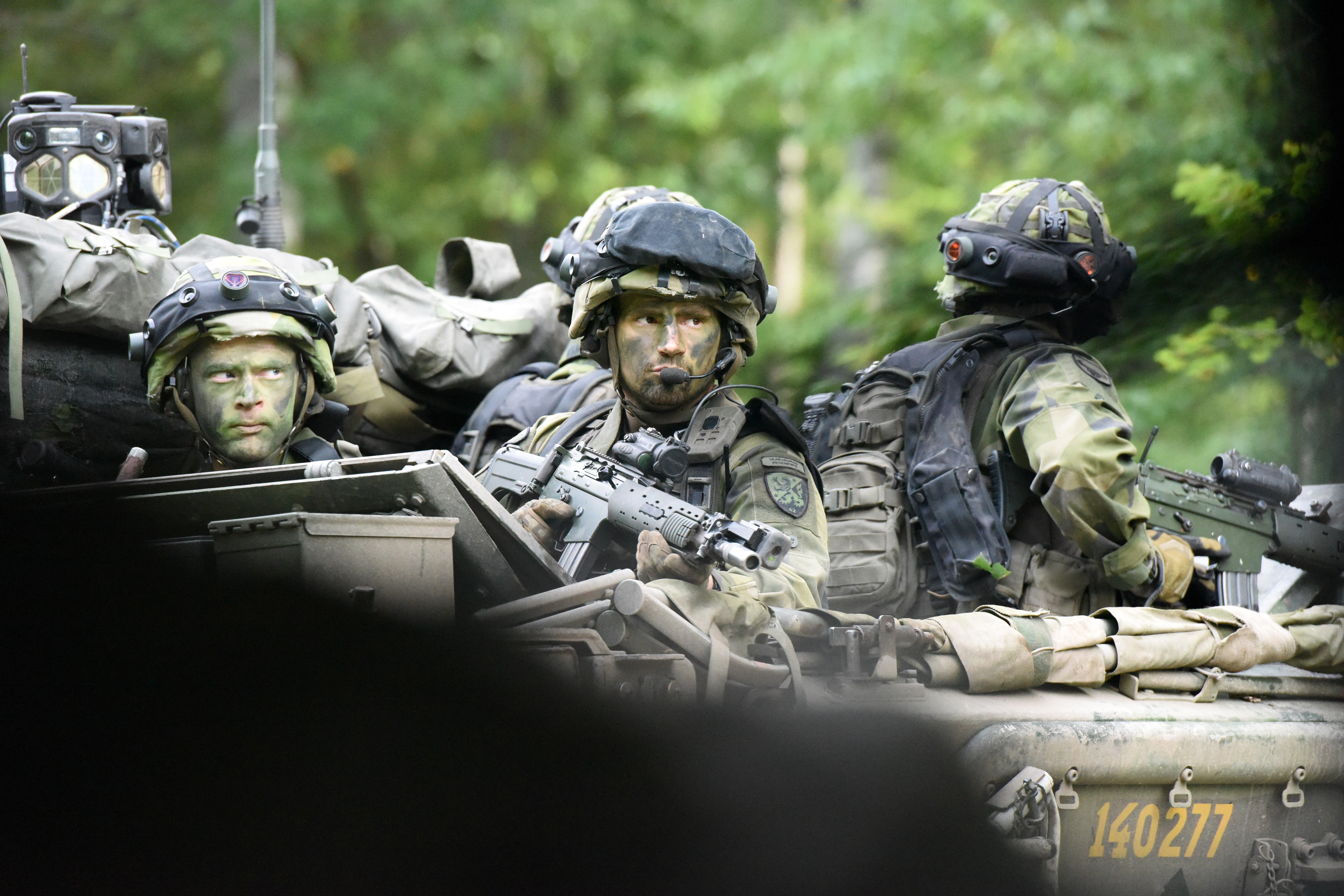
Mechanised infantry near Skövde, 2017.

=== Organisation ===
As of 2022, the planned wartime organisation of the Skaraborg Brigade at full operational capacity is as follows, with full capability expected to be reached by 2027:

- 4th Mechanised Brigade
  - 4th Brigade Staff
    - 4th Brigade Headquarters Company (Note: Organised from the 11th Management Battalion of the Command and Control Regiment.)
    - 4th Brigade Reconnaissance Company
    - 4th Brigade Air Defence Company
    - 4th Brigade Signals Company (Note: Organised from the 12th Signals Battalion of the Command and Control Regiment.)
  - 41st Mechanised Battalion
  - 42nd Mechanised Battalion
  - 43rd Mechanised Battalion
  - 4th Brigade Artillery Battalion (Note: Organised from the 92nd Artillery Battalion of the Boden Artillery Regiment.)
  - 4th Brigade Engineer Battalion (Note: Organised from the 21st Engineer Battalion of the Göta Engineer Regiment.)
  - 4th Brigade Support Battalion (Note: Organised from the 1st Logistics Battalion of the Göta Logistic Regiment.)
  - 4th Tank Transport Company (Note: Organised from the 1st Heavy Transport Company of the Skaraborg Regiment.)

== Heraldry and traditions ==
The Skaraborg Brigade shared heraldry and traditions with the Skaraborg Regiment. In the years 1998–2000, the brigade managed the traditions of the regiment.

The most commonly used beret colour is black, worn by all light and mechanized infantry units.

When the Skaraborg Brigade was disbanded in 2000, the Skaraborgs regementes och Skaraborgsbrigadens (MekB 9) förtjänstmedalj ("Skaraborg Regiment and Skaraborg Brigade (MekB 9) Medal of Merit") in gold and silver (SkarabregbrigGM/SM) of the 8th size was established in 1999. The medal ribbon is divided in black and yellow moiré with a white stripe on the middle followed on both sides by a red stripe.

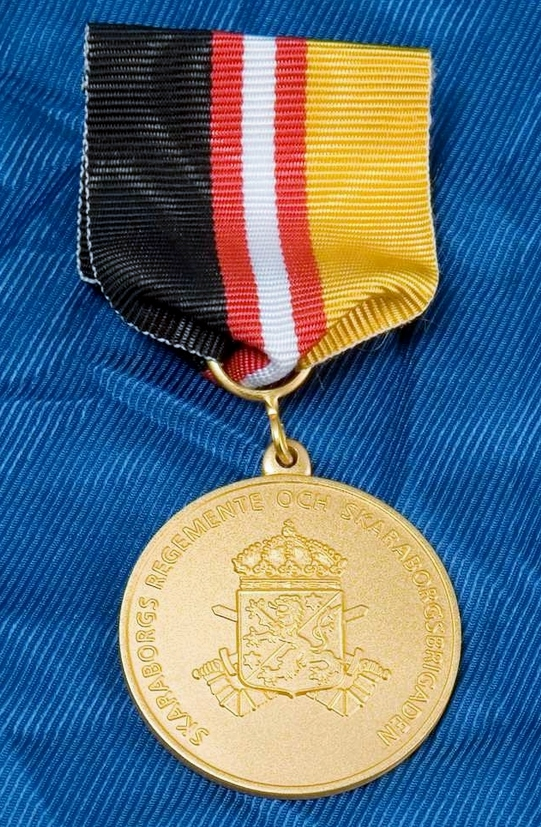
Skaraborg Regiment and Skaraborg Brigade (MekB 9) Medal of Merit.

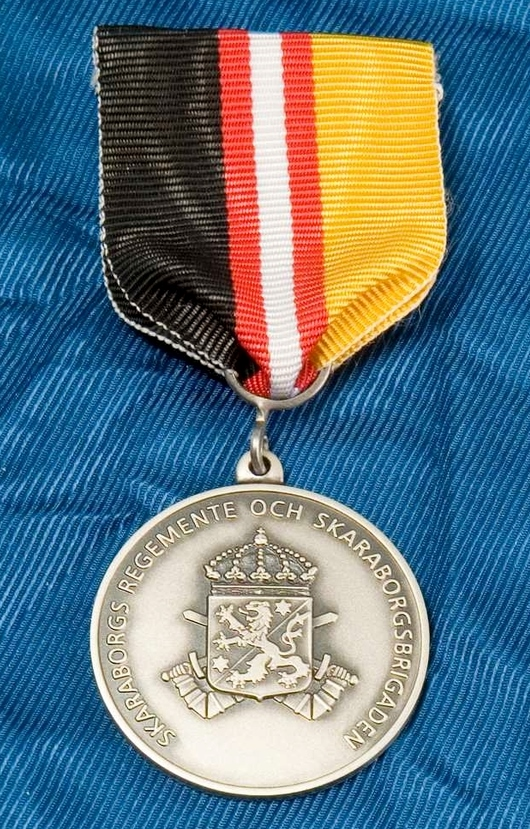
Skaraborg Regiment and Skaraborg Brigade (MekB 9) Medal of Merit.

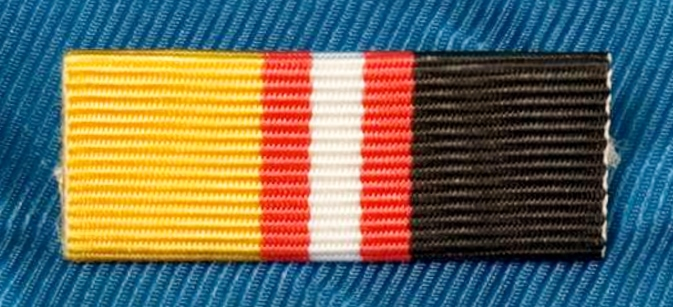
Ribbon of the Skaraborg Regiment and Skaraborg Brigade (MekB 9) Medal of Merit.

== Commanders ==
The commanders of the brigade throughout its history are as follows:

- 1949–1989: ?
- 1989–1992: Col Alf Sandqvist
- 1992–1995: Col Peter Lundberg
- 1995–1999: Col Tony Stigsson
- 1999–2000: Col Jörgen Britzen
- 2000–2022: Inactive
- 2022–2025: Col Michael Carlén
- 2025–present: LtCol Peter Andersson

== Attributes ==
Name	Translation	From		To
9. pansarbrigaden	9th Armoured Brigade	1943-??-??	–	1949-09-30
Skaraborgsbrigaden	Skaraborg Brigade	1949-10-01	–	1997-12-31
Skaraborgs regemente och Skaraborgsbrigaden	Skaraborg Regiment and Skaraborg Brigade	1998-01-01	–	2000-06-30
Skaraborgsbrigaden	Skaraborg Brigade	2022-01-01	–	
Designation		From		To
9. pansarbrig		1943-??-??	–	1949-09-30
PB 9		1949-10-01	–	1997-12-31
MekB 9		1998-01-01	–	2000-06-30
MekB 4		2022-01-01	–	
Location		From		To
Skövde Garrison		1949-10-01	–	2000-06-30
Skövde Garrison		2022-01-01	–	

== See also ==
- List of Swedish Army brigades
