= 31st Ranger Battalion =

Swedish Army unit

- 31. jägarbataljonen
- Active: 2003–2013, 2016–present
- Country: Sweden
- Allegiance: Swedish Armed Forces
- Branch: Swedish Army
- Type: Rapid reaction force
- Size: Battalion
- Part of: Life Regiment Hussars (K 3)
- Garrison/HQ: Karlsborg
- Engagements: War in Afghanistan (2001–present)

Insignia
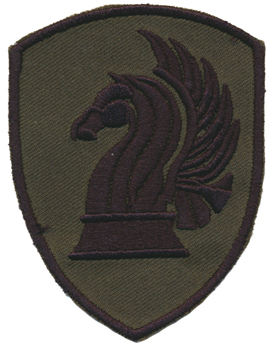
- Military patch

The 31st Ranger Battalion (Swedish: 31. jägarbataljonen), previously called the 31st Light Infantry Battalion (Swedish: 31. lätta skyttebataljonen, 31. LSkbat), is a specialized light infantry unit of the Swedish Army. The unit is part of the Life Regiment Hussars and is based in Karlsborg. It is the primary support unit for the Special Operations Group (SOG). The battalion utilizes different means of transportation and is trained for airborne operations.

As per the Defence Act of 2020, the 31st is to be redesignated as a ranger battalion, previously having been designated as a light infantry battalion.

== Operations and training ==
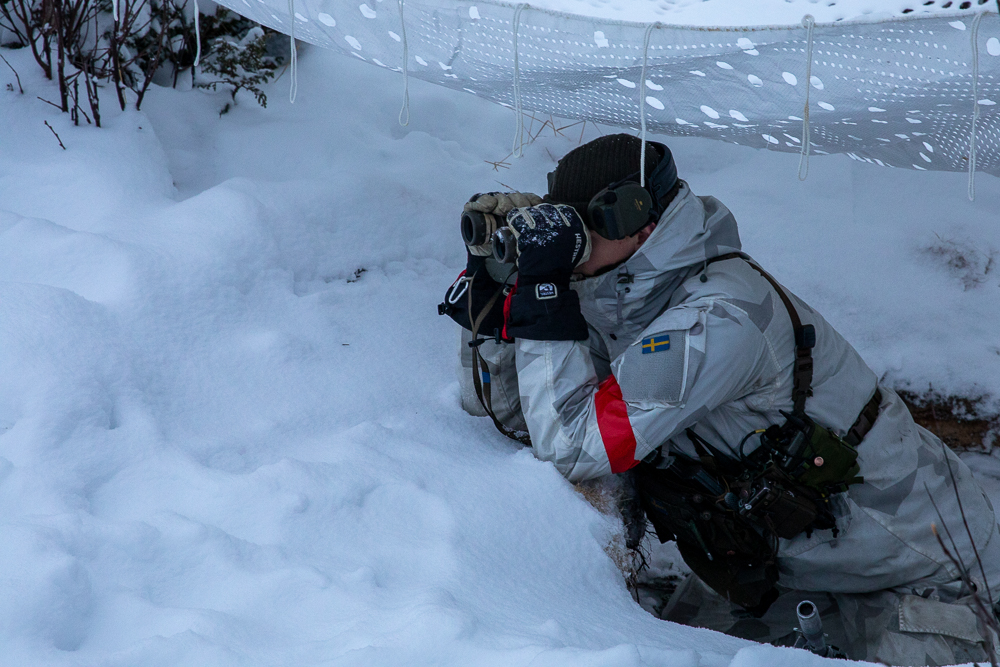
Swedish Arctic Rangers Train During Exercise Adamant Serpent 25

The battalion is a rapid reaction force and is supported by helicopters and transport aircraft. Advance to contact on the ground is to be carried out with the units own light all terrain vehicles or on foot. The unit is built on man-portable systems and operates in a, for the purpose, composed task force. It is considered the most mobile unit in the Swedish Army due to its light nature and ability to be transported via air and dropped by parachute, and have a good ability to use precision guided weapons. The battalion is also tasked with providing infantry support to the Special Operations Task Group. The battalion continuously deployed to Afghanistan until the Swedish ISAF mission ended.

All recruits applying for service with the battalion undergo the same basic training as every other recruit in the Armed Forces (3 months). Though they are required to undertake a selection course in order to be considered for further training and service with the battalion. Training to become a Ranger with the battalion is 6–8 months excluding basic training.

== Organisation ==
Prior to 2013, the battalion consists of the following squadrons:

- 311th Airborne Squadron
- 312th Airborne Squadron
- 313th Airborne Squadron
- 314th Airborne Squadron
- 315th HQ & Support Squadron

Each rifle squadron (311th, 312th and 313th) consisted of three rifle platoons, one mortar platoon and one HQ/support platoon. The supply squadron (314th) of a pioneer platoon, a supply platoon and medical platoon. The HQ/support squadron (315th) consisted of the battalion HQ, a command & control platoon (also includes the battalions TACP) and a reconnaissance platoon.

After temporarily being disbanded and re-organized the battalion was re-instated as a battle group (although retaining the classification as a battalion) in 2015. In its current form it's made up of three squadrons:

- 310th HQ & Support Squadron
- 311th Airborne Squadron
- 312th Airborne Squadron

== See also ==
- United Kingdom – Special Forces Support Group
- United States – 75th Ranger Regiment
- Sweden – 193rd Ranger Battalion
