= Revingeby =

Revinge
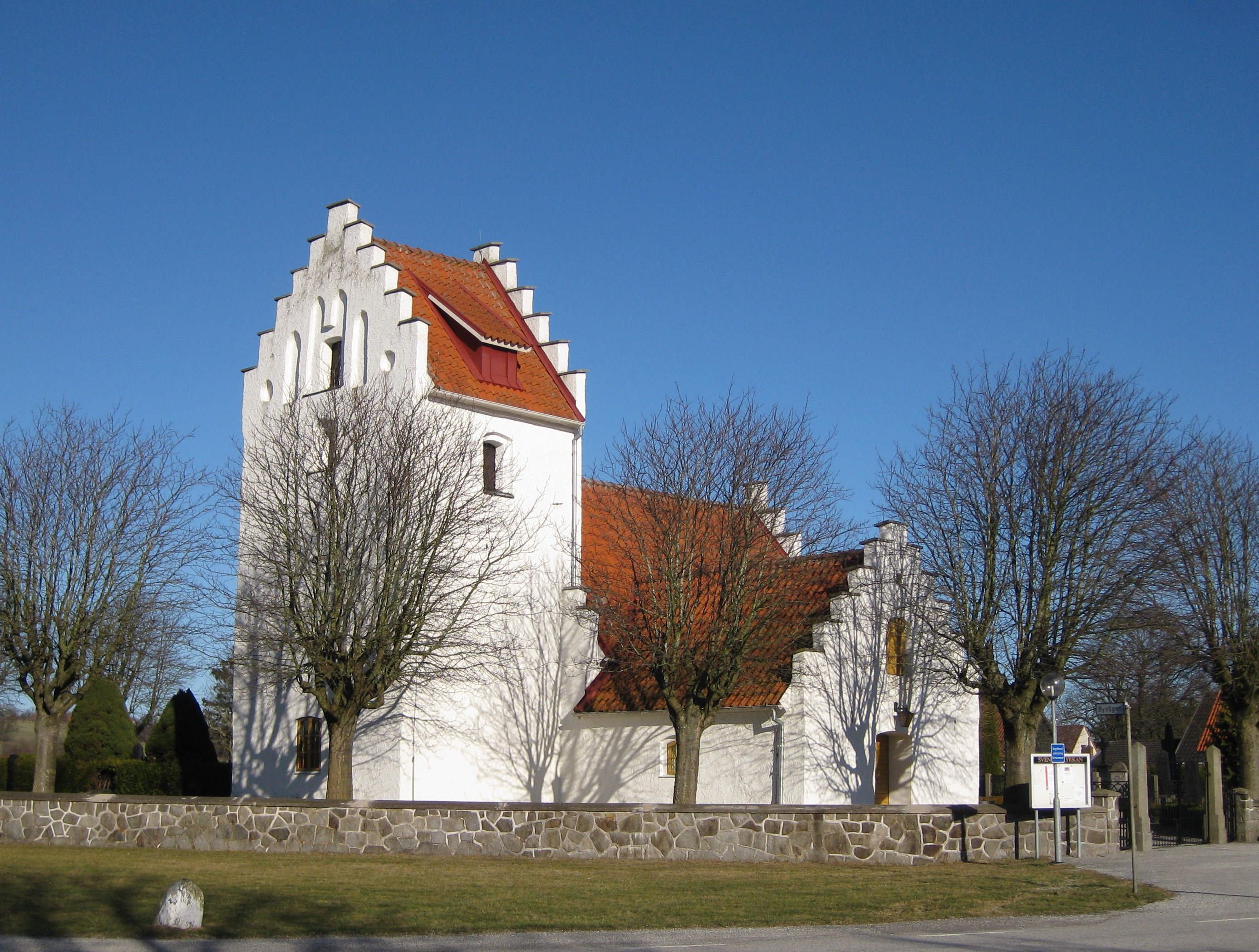
- Revinge Church in Revinge

- Location within Skåne Location within Sweden
- Coordinates: 55°44′N 13°28′E
- Country: Sweden
- Province: Skåne
- County: Skåne County
- Municipality: Lund Municipality

Area
  - Total: 0.65 km^{2} (0.25 sq mi)

Population (31 December 2010)
  - Total: 545
  - Density: 834/km^{2} (2,160/sq mi)
- Time zone: UTC+1 (CET)
  - Summer (DST): UTC+2 (CEST)

Revinge ( Revinge) is a locality situated in Lund Municipality, Skåne County, Sweden with 545 inhabitants in 2010.

Parts of the medieval Revinge Church date from the 13th century.
