= Stridsvagn 122 =

Swedish main battle tank

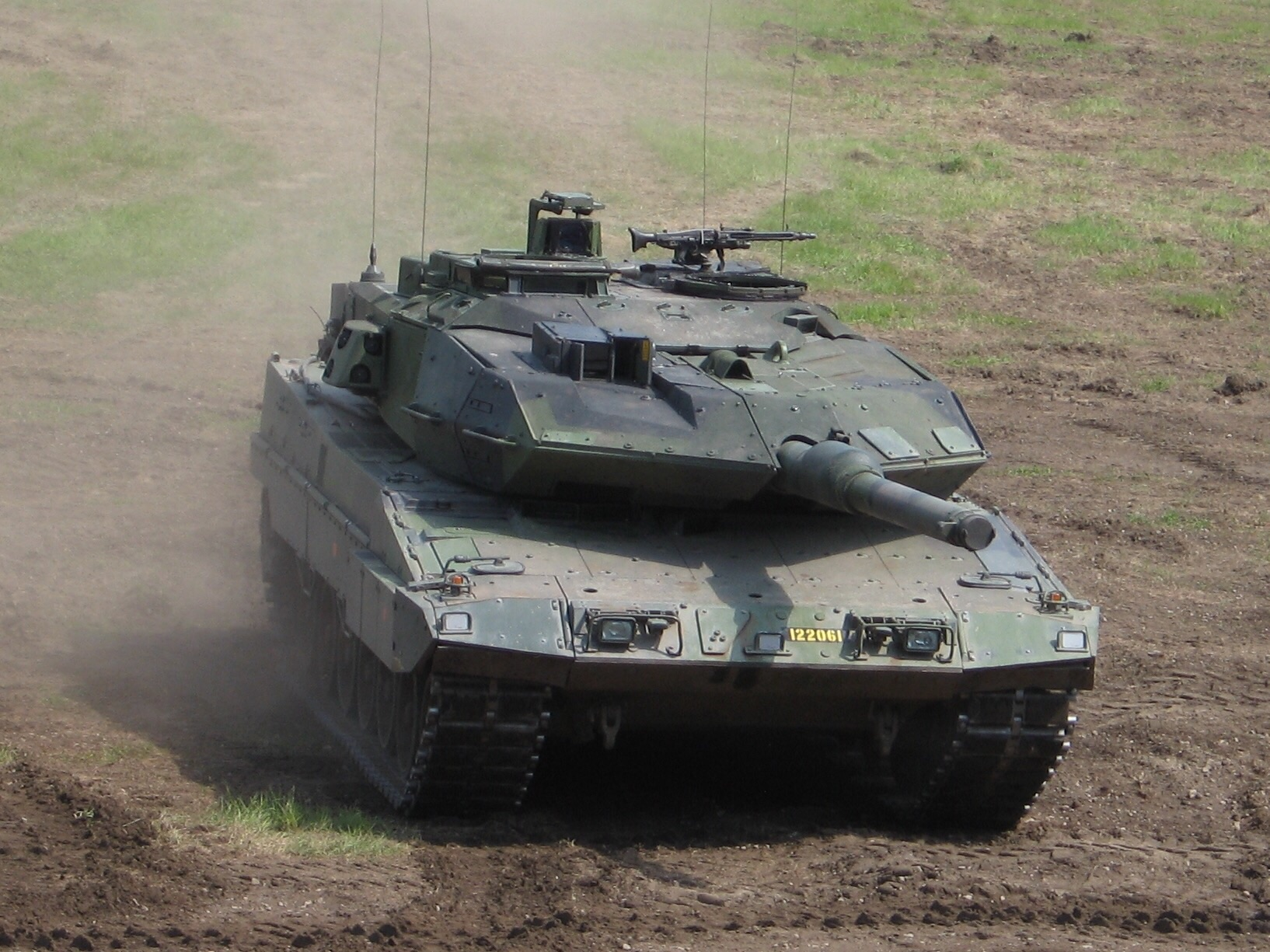
- A Swedish Stridsvagn 122 in June 2010
- Type: Main battle tank
- Place of origin: Sweden and Germany

Service history
- In service: 1997–present
- Used by: Swedish Army; Ukrainian Ground Forces
- Wars: Russo-Ukrainian War; Russian invasion of Ukraine

Production history
- Manufacturer: Krauss-Maffei Wegmann: 29 chassis Land Systems Hägglunds AB: 91 chassis
- Unit cost: US$5.74 million (FY 1994) (~$11.9 million FY 2023)
- Produced: 1994–2002
- No. built: 120
- Variants: Strv 122A (110 chassis); Strv 122B (10 chassis)

Specifications
- Mass: 62.5 tonnes (61.5 long tons; 68.9 short tons)
- Length: 9.97 m (32 ft 9 in) (gun forward)
- Width: 3.75 m (12 ft 4 in)
- Height: 3.0 m (9 ft 10 in)
- Crew: 4
- Armour: 3rd generation composite; including high-hardness steel, tungsten and plastic filler with ceramic component.
- Main armament: 1 x 12 cm kan strv 122 (120 mm Rheinmetall L44 smoothbore tank gun); 42 rounds
- Secondary armament: 2 x 7.62×51mm NATO Ksp m/94 machine gun 4,750 rounds 4 x 2 GALIX smoke grenade launchers
- Engine: MTU MB 873 Ka-501 liquid-cooled V-12 Twin-turbo diesel engine 1,500 PS (1,479 hp, 1,103 kW) at 2,600 rpm
- Power/weight: 24.19 PS/t (17.79 kW/t)
- Transmission: Renk HSWL 354
- Suspension: Torsion-bar suspension
- Ground clearance: 540 mm
- Fuel capacity: 1,200 liters (317 US gallons; 264 imp. gal)
- Operational range: 550 km (340 mi) (internal fuel)
- Maximum speed: 68 km/h (42 mph)

Front view of Strv 123A; Noticeable exterior differences include a longer barrel and add-on driver electronic systems

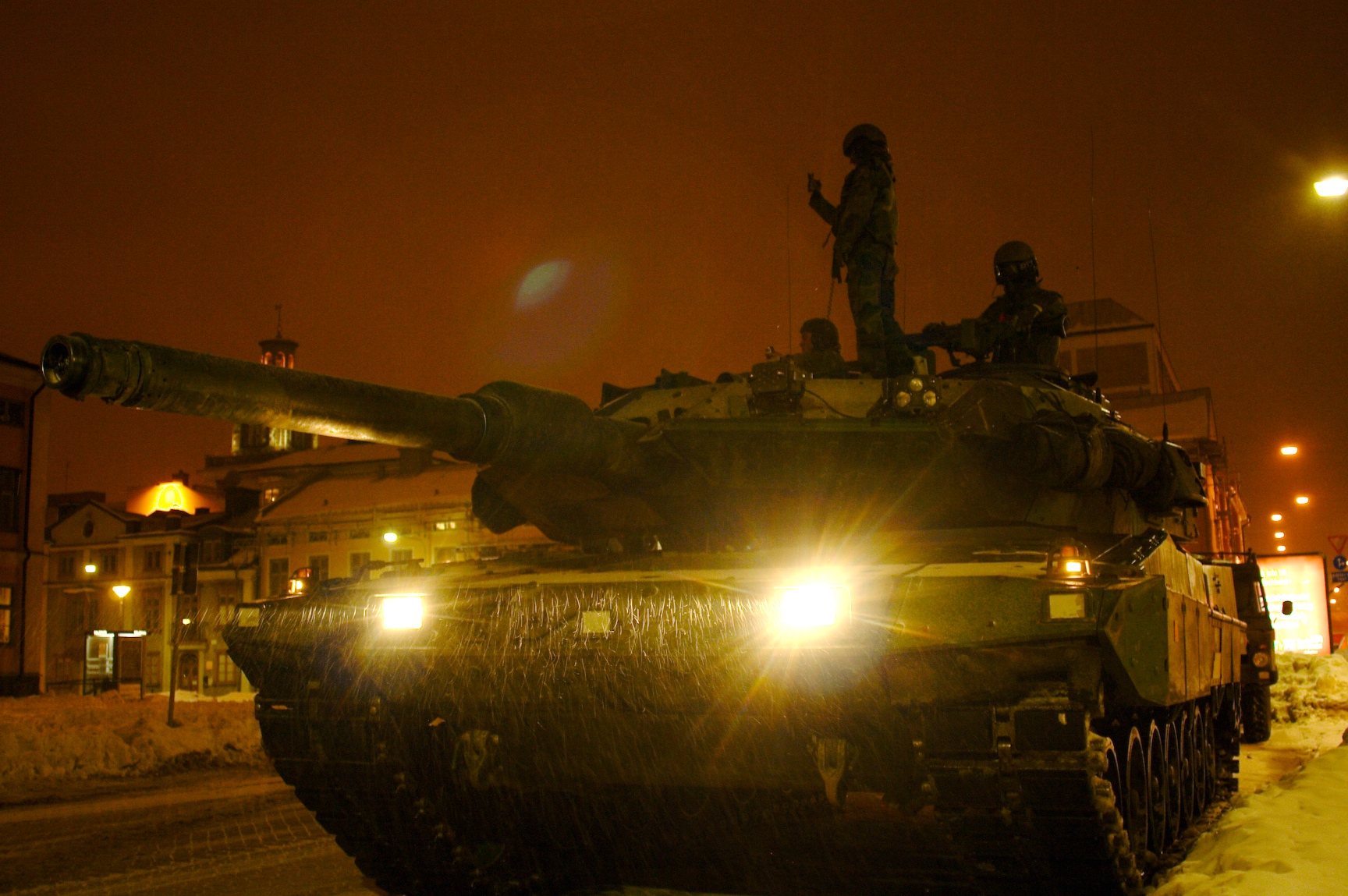
Stridsvagn 122 during an urban warfare exercise, 2006

Stridsvagn 122 (strv 122, IPA: [ˈstrɪ̂tːsvaŋn]) (Note: "Strv" is the Swedish military abbreviation of stridsvagn, Swedish for chariot and tank (literally combat wagon), while the number "122" comes from the Swedish designation system for tanks, where the two initial numbers, 12, indicates the calibre of the tank’s main gun, 12 cm, and the last number indicates that it is the second tank model with said calibre to enter service with the Swedish military. Note, the Swedish designation "stridsvagn 122" and abbreviation "strv 122" are not "names" canonically and should not be capitalized within a sentence.) is a Swedish main battle tank that, like the German Leopard 2A5, is based on the German Leopard 2 Improved variant using such newer technology as command, control, and fire-control systems, reinforced armour, and long-term combat capacity. Externally, the vehicle is distinguished from the Leopard 2A5 by the French GALIX smoke dispensers, different storage bins, and the thicker crew hatches.

== Development ==
After the strv 2000 project for a new Swedish main battle tank was cancelled, the Swedish government decided in 1991 that a foreign main battle tank was to be procured to replace the Strv 101, 102, 103 and 104 in service at the time. During the project "Strv Ny", three tank models were sent to Sweden to participate in trials: the American M1A2 Abrams, the German Leopard 2 Improved, and a prototype variant of the French Leclerc.

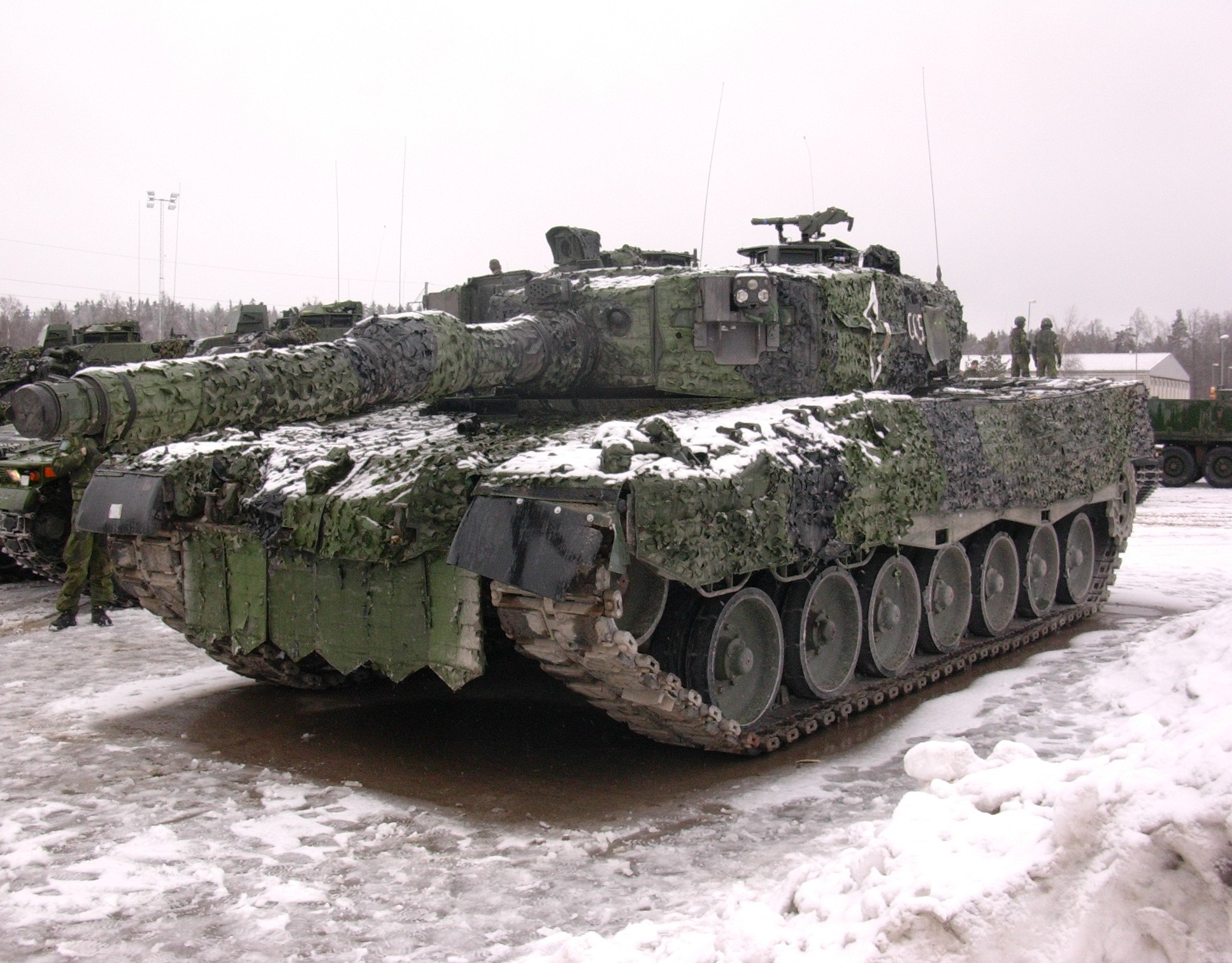
Strv 121 with applied Barracuda IR-dampening camo net

The trials concluded with the Leopard 2 approved as the winner and the M1A2 in second place. The shortcomings of the Leclerc were partly attributed to it still being in the development phase and not yet mature for service. In 1994 the Swedish government decided to acquire 120 new production tanks and 160 older Leopard 2A4s as a stopgap before the newer tanks were finished. The Leopard 2A4 in Swedish service became designated strv 121 while the new production became the strv 122. Of the 120 strv 122, 29 were manufactured by Krauss-Maffei Wegmann and the other 91 were manufactured by Bofors and Hägglunds.

== Features ==
The Leopard 2A5's width of 3.75 meters was maintained and the weight increased by 350 kilograms (770 lb).

The strv 122 was designed to fight in Swedish conditions including heavily forested areas as well as urban terrain. The designation derives from the 12 cm gun; it was the second tank in Swedish service featuring this calibre (the first being the strv 121 — a Leopard 2A4 fitted with Swedish lights and radios and painted in Swedish camouflage). The Swedish strv 122 features:

- Heavily reinforced armour to protect against man-portable anti-tank weapons.
- An advanced CBRN defence system for protection against chemical, biological, and radioactive weapons.
- Wading capability to pass through water up to 1.4 meters deep.
- Quick ability to discover, identify, and lock-on a target with the assistance of a laser rangefinder, thermographic camera, and a speed/distance/accuracy calculator for maximum accuracy.
- Ability to lock-on to numerous targets at once, enabling the tank to fight numerous enemy vehicles without having to manually re-aim the gun after every shot.
- Active communication for improved cooperation between units.
- Tank Command & Control System (TCCS) by Celsius Tech Systems AB.

== Production and service ==
Only 42 strv 122 tanks were in active service as of 2013, with each tank being rotated with those kept in storage to minimise wear. They were divided between three companies, two at the Skaraborg Regiment, P 4 at Skövde and one at Norrbottens Regiment, I 19 at Boden. That August the Swedish government announced that it would be upgrading its strv 122 tanks to extend their operational lifespan to 2030. Initial reports stated that 56 tanks were set to be upgraded but this figure was later revised to 42. In 2016, upgrades for 88 tanks were ordered. The tanks would receive a tactical battalion command system (Stridsledningssystem Bataljon) from SAAB, a new observation/gun sight (TIM) for the commander, and new communication systems for international missions. A modular 360° ballistic protection system had been planned but not implemented.

Krauss-Maffei Wegmann was contracted to do the upgrades for 46 tanks, while the remainder were handled by the Swedish Defence Materiel Administration (FMV) with upgrade kits procured from Krauss-Maffei Wegmann. Planned delivery between 2018 and 2023.

In 2015, the Swedish government decided that an additional tank company should be established on the island of Gotland. This company was to be trained at P 4 and transferred to the re-established Gotland Regiment, P 18 in 2019.

On 24 February 2023 the Swedish government announced that it would send 10 Strv 122A to the Armed Forces of Ukraine.

=== Stridsvagn 123A ===
In October 2023 the Swedish Defence Materiel Administration (FMV) announced that a total of 44 Strv 122 would be upgraded to the Strv 123A standard. Modifications include the more powerful L/55 A1 gun, new tracks, an Auxiliary Power Unit (APU), improved optics for the commander and gunner, and a night sight for the driver. Most of the electronics will be replaced along with Swedish subsystems to increase interoperability with NATO Tanks. With the new systems, more types of ammunition can be used. Protection for the crew has also been increased, with the driver sitting in a suspended harness instead of being fixed to the floor; increasing mine protection. The tanks will be upgraded by KNDS. The first Strv 123A tank is to be delivered in 2026.

In January 2025, alongside the purchase of Strv 123B, the order included all Strv 122s to be upgraded to 123A Standard.

On June 22, 2026 KNDS announced the first of 110 Strv 123A Tanks have arrived in Sweden, The modernisations will be fully complete by 2030 and deliveries to the armed forces will be complete by 2031 with 22 tanks per year.

=== Stridsvagn 123B ===
In January 2025, the Swedish government announced the purchase of 44 Leopard 2A8 tanks in an order worth approximately €2 billion. The order also includes upgrading the rest of Sweden's stridsvagn 122 fleet to stridsvagn 123A standard. The new tanks are to be delivered in 2028 to 2031 and will be designated stridsvagn 123B.

== Variants ==
- Stridsvagn 122A – Baseline variant. Entered service in 1997.
- Stridsvagn 122B – Variant with improved mine protection; 10 were upgraded from existing strv 122A models in 2002.
- Stridsvagn 122B Int. – Variant for international deployments in warmer climates with NATO-compatible command and control systems as well as infrared signature damping Barracuda camouflage nets; four were converted from strv 122A models in 2011
- Stridsvagn 122C – Renovated strv 122A with updated command and control systems by FMV's FSV Mv division and Krauss-Maffei Wegmann.
- Stridsvagn 122D – Renovated strv 122B with updated command and control systems by FMV's FSV Mv division and Krauss-Maffei Wegmann.
- Stridsvagn 122B+ Evolution – Prototype made by IBD and Åkers Krutbruk Protection AB in 2010. Increased protection levels using more advanced composite materials.
- Stridsvagn 123A – Upgraded variant with L/55 gun, programmable ammunition, new driver's night sight and improved optics. First delivery in 2026.
- Stridsvagn 123B – Leopard 2A8 ordered in January 2025. First delivery expected in 2028.

== Operational history ==
=== Ukraine war ===
On 24 September 2023, during the Zaporizhzhia counteroffensive in the Russian invasion of Ukraine, two Ukrainian Strv 122 tanks were lost in combat. One of them was recovered shortly after, repaired, and later inspected by Ukrainian President Volodymyr Zelenskyy.

On 30 October 2023, a strv 122 tank was knocked out by a Russian heavy anti-tank missile. The four crew of the tank were reported to have been seen escaping.

According to the Oryx blog as of 1 July 2025, nine out of ten strv 122, had been destroyed, damaged, or abandoned during the Russian invasion of Ukraine.

== Operators ==
=== Current operators ===
Sweden
120 units of Strv 122 ordered and built in Germany and Sweden, 10 of which were donated to Ukraine in 2023.
The 110 remaining Strv 122 were modernised by Sweden to the Strv 123A standard, first delivered in 2026.
Ukraine
10 units donated by Sweden in 2023, 9 were destroyed, damaged or captured as of 2025.
