= Swedish Army =

Land branch of the Swedish Armed Forces

- Armén
- Coat of arms of the Swedish Army
- Founded: 1521; 505 years ago
- Country: Sweden
- Size: ~15,300 (active duty personnel) ~63,000 (wartime strength) (unofficial number)
- Part of: Swedish Armed Forces
- March: "Svenska arméns paradmarsch"
- Anniversaries: 14 January
- Equipment: List of Swedish Army equipment
- Engagements: See list: Swedish War of Liberation; Danish Count's Feud; Great Russian War; Northern Seven Years' War; Livonian War; Russo-Swedish War (1590–1595); War against Sigismund; Polish War; De la Gardie Campaign; Ingrian War; Kalmar War; Thirty Years' War; Torstenson War; First Bremian War; Second Northern War; Second Bremian War; Scanian War; Great Northern War; Hats' Russian War; Seven Years' War; Gustav III's Russian War; First Barbary War; War of the Fourth Coalition; Finnish War; War of the Sixth Coalition; Campaign against Norway; Congo Crisis; 1999 East Timorese crisis; War in Afghanistan
- Website: Official site

Commanders
- Chief of Army: MajGen Johan Pekkari
- Deputy Chief of Army: BGen Per Nilsson
- Chief of the Army Staff: Col Stefan Jansson
- Notable commanders: See list: Gustavus Adolphus; Johan Banér; Lennart Torstensson; Charles X Gustav; Charles XI; Charles XII; Carl Gustav Rehnskiöld; Adam Ludwig Lewenhaupt; Charles XIV John; Curt von Stedingk; Gustaf Mauritz Armfelt; Johan August Sandels

The Swedish Army (Swedish: Svenska Armén) is the land force of the Swedish Armed Forces of the Kingdom of Sweden. Beginning with its service in 1521, the Swedish Army has been active for more than 500 years.

== History ==
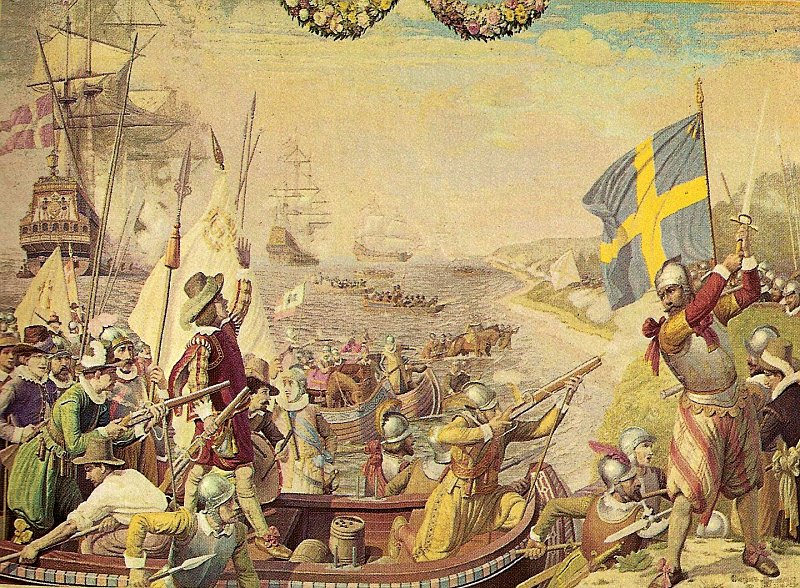
Depiction of the Kalmar War. The conflict, lasting from 1611 to 1613, was fought between Denmark–Norway and the Kingdom of Sweden. Battle of Narva (1700)

Svea Life Guards dates back to the year 1521, when the men of Dalarna chose 16 young able men as body guards for the insurgent nobleman Gustav Vasa in the war against the Union of Kalmar, thus making the present-day Life Guards one of the world's oldest regiments still on active duty.

In 1901, Sweden introduced conscription. The conscription system was abolished in 2010 but reinstated in 2017.

== Organisation ==
The peace-time organisation of the Swedish Army is divided into a number of regiments for the different branches. The number of active regiments has been reduced since the end of the Cold War in the late 1980s. However the Swedish Army has begun to expand once again, due to an increasing threat from the east with a resurgent Russian Federation and its attack on neighboring Ukraine in 2014 / 2022. Thus resulting in longtime neutral Sweden to become a full-fledged member of the 75-year-old Western / Central European and North America democratic and military alliance of the North Atlantic Treaty Organization (NATO). The regiment forms training organisations that train the various battalions of the army and home guard.

The Swedish Armed Forces recently underwent a transformation from conscription-based recruitment to a professional defence organisation increasing to an all-volunteer force. This is part of a larger goal to abandon the mass army from the Cold War era and develop an army better suited to modern maneuver warfare and at the same time retain a higher readiness. Since 2014, the Swedish Army has had around 50,000 soldiers in either full-time or part-time duty, with eight mechanised infantry battalions instantly available at any time and the full force of 71 battalions ready to be deployed within one week. The regular army consists of 8 mechanised maneuver battalions, 19 support battalions of different kinds including artillery battalions, anti-aircraft battalions, combat engineer battalions, rangers, logistics battalions and 4 reserve heavy armoured battalions and 40 territorial defence battalions. The battalion is the core unit but all units are completely modular and can be arranged in combat teams from company to brigade level with different units depending on the task. There are a total of 6 permanent staffs under the central command capable of handling large battlegroups, 4 regional staffs, 3 brigade staffs and 1 divisional staff.

=== Leadership ===
Until 1937 the King was the formal Head of the Army, and until 1974 of the Armed Forces at large. In 1937, the Chief of the Army position and headquarters staff (Swedish: Chefen för armén, CA) was created to lead the Army in peacetime. Following a larger reorganisation of the Swedish Armed Forces in 1994, CA ceased to exist as an independent agency, and all of the Armed Forces was centralised under the Supreme Commander (ÖB). Instead, the post Chief of Army Staff (Swedish: Chefen för arméledningen) was created at the then newly instituted Swedish Armed Forces Headquarters (HKV).

In 1998, the Swedish Armed Forces was yet again reorganised. Most of the duties of the Chief of Army Staff were transferred to the newly instituted post of "Inspector General of the Army" (Swedish: Generalinspektören för armén). The post is similar to that of the "Inspector General of the Swedish Navy" (Swedish: Generalinspektören för marinen) and the "Inspector General of the Swedish Air Force" (Swedish: Generalinspektören för flygvapnet), later renamed to "Inspector of the Army" (Swedish: Arméinspektören). In 2014, the Chief of Army (Swedish: Arméchefen, AC) position was reinstated.

=== Regiments ===
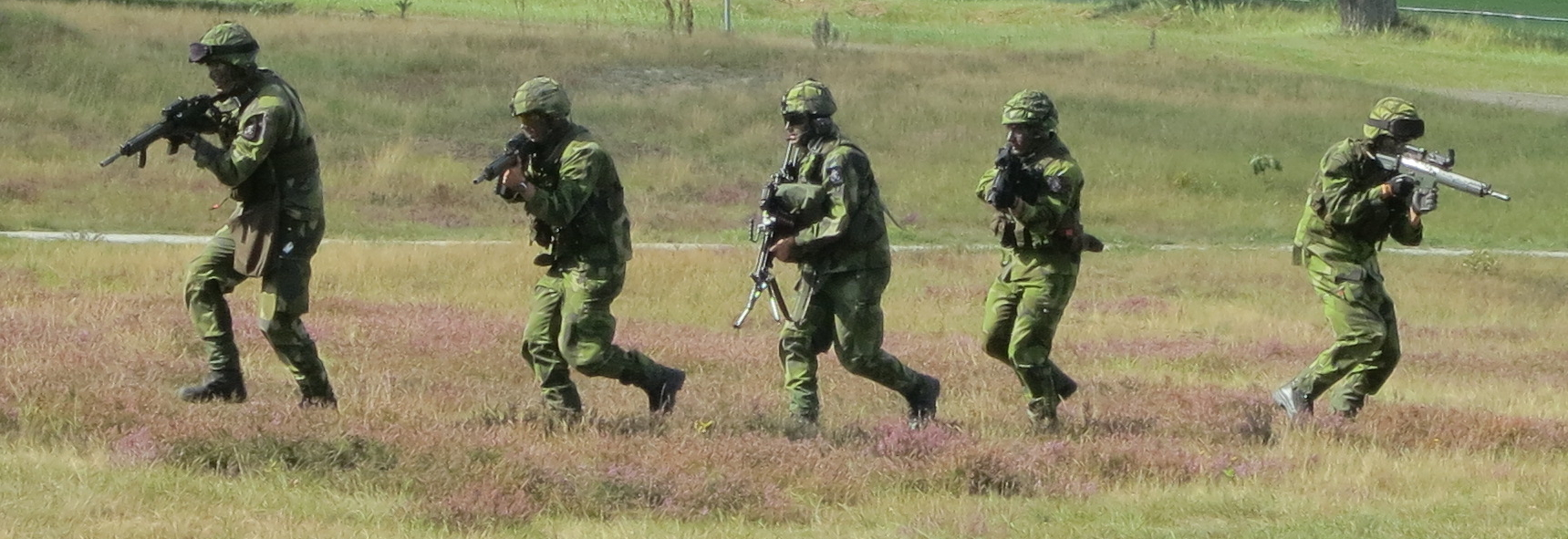
Swedish soldiers during a training exercise.

Swedish Army regiments are tasked with training conscripts for the operational battalions of the army's rapid reaction organisation. The Gotland Regiment is the only regiment that also trains Home Guard troops. The currently active regiments and their main peacetime subordinate units are:

- Life Guards (LG), in Stockholm
  - Life Guards Battalion
  - Guards Battalion trains conscripts for the 1st Infantry Brigade
  - 1st Motorized Infantry Battalion
  - 2× Motorized infantry battalions to be formed by 2030
  - 1st Military Police Battalion
  - 13th Security Battalion
  - Armed Forces Military Police Unit (FM MPE)
  - Swedish Armed Forces Music Corps (FöMus)
  - Armed Forces International Centre (Swedint)
- Dalarna Regiment (I 13), in Falun
  - 2× Infantry battalions, in Falun
- Norrbotten Regiment (I 19), in Boden
  - Norrbotten Armoured Battalion (Pbat / I 19) trains the troops of the 191st and 192nd mechanized battalions, and 19th brigade reconnaissance company
  - Armed Forces Winter Unit (FMVE), in Boden and Arvidsjaur
- Västernorrland Regiment (I 21), in Sollefteå
  - 2× Infantry battalions, in Sollefteå
  - Jämtland Ranger Corps (JFK), in Östersund
- Life Regiment Hussars (K 3), in Karlsborg
  - Training companies, train the troops of the 31st Ranger Battalion and 32nd Intelligence Battalion
  - Armed Forces Survival School
- Norrland Dragoon Regiment (K 4), in Arvidsjaur
  - Training companies, trains the troops of the 41st Arctic Ranger Battalion, in Arvidsjaur and 42nd Arctic Ranger Battalion (forming), in Arvidsjaur
- Skaraborg Regiment (P 4), in Skövde
  - Training unit (KFE), trains the troops of the 41st and 42nd mechanized battalions, 1st heavy transport company, and 4th brigade reconnaissance company, headquarters of the 1st Divisional Staff
- South Scanian Regiment (P 7), in Revingehed
  - Training unit (KFE), trains the troops of the 71st and 72nd Light mechanized Battalion
- Gotland Regiment (P 18), in Visby
  - Gotlandsgruppen (GLG), trains and supports the Home Guard on Gotland
    - Gotland Battalion (32nd Home Guard Battalion), in Visby
- Boden Artillery Regiment (A 8) in Boden
  - Artillery Battalion, trains the troops of the 81st and 82nd artillery battalions
  - Artillery Combat School
- Bergslagen Artillery Regiment (A 9) in Kristinehamn
  - Artillery Battalion, trains the troops of the 91st and 92nd artillery battalions
- Air Defence Regiment (Lv 6), in Halmstad
  - Air Defence Battalion, trains the troops of the 61st and 62nd air defence battalions
- Göta Engineer Regiment (Ing 2), in Eksjö
  - Engineer Battalion, trains the troops of the 21st and 22nd engineer battalions
  - Field Works School
- Göta Logistic Regiment (T 2), in Skövde
  - Training unit, training the troops of the 1st and 2nd logistic battalions

=== Swedish Army regimental organization graphic ===
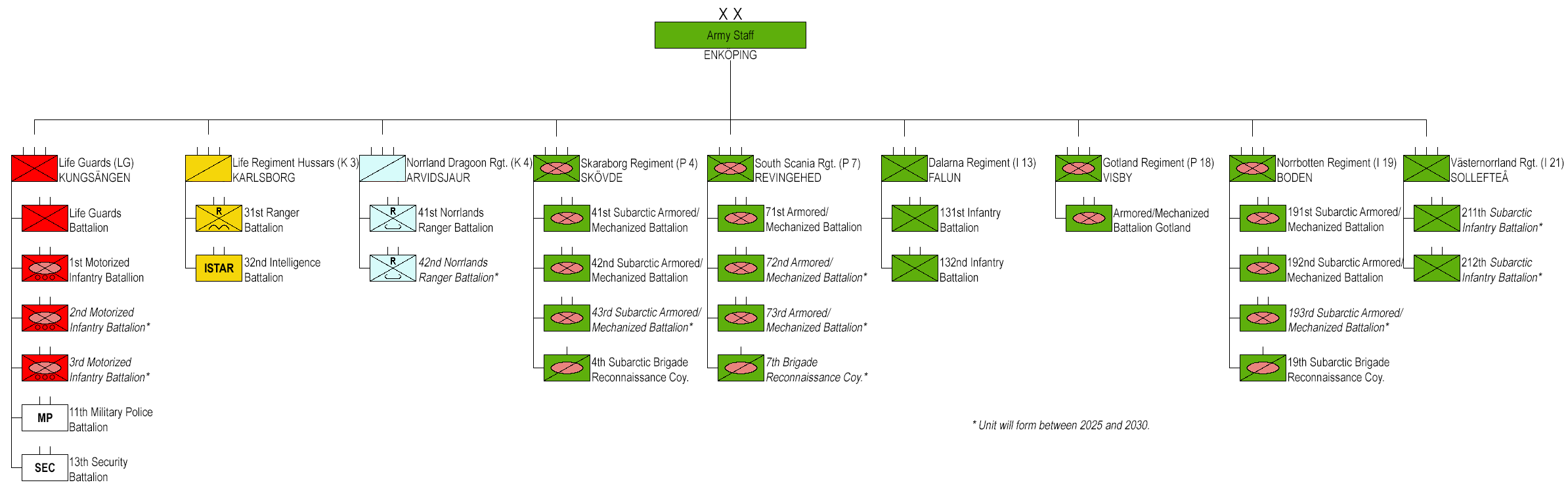
Swedish Army regiments and their operational formations 2026

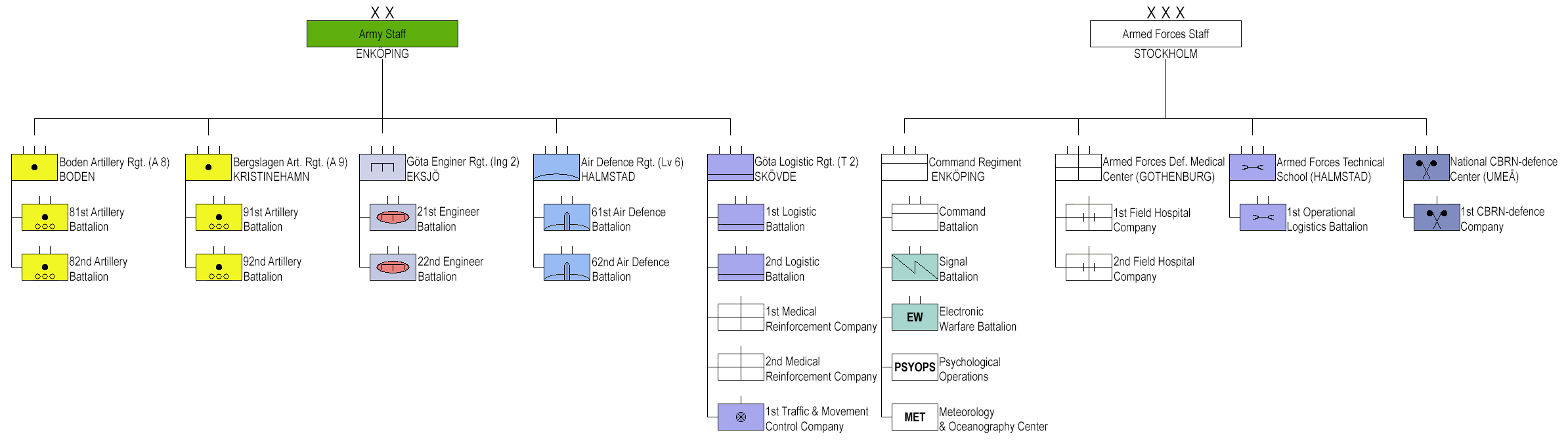
Swedish Army and Armed Forces combat support and combat service support operational formations 2026

=== Operational formations ===
The Swedish Army distinguishes an administrative from an operational structure. The administrative structure includes the peacetime depot units (depåförband), which are responsible for the training, equipment and combat readiness of the forces. Depot units are the army regiments, the air force flotillas, the naval flotillas or the armed forces centers. The depot units generate wartime units (krigsförband), which are transferred to their respective wartime formations, so normally the Swedish army regiments are composed of administrative and training companies during peacetime and their battalions are only formed for exercises and during wartime. The operational units in their entirety are known as the operational organisation of the armed forces (Försvarsmaktens Insatsorganisation (FM IO or just IO, followed by the year it has been introduced in, as IO 2018 or just IO 18 for example) in Swedish). The operational organisation of the army plans for the training regiments to form two combat brigades (2nd and 3rd Brigades) and a number of independent combat battalions within a few days. This plan, however, was considered by the Supreme Commander to be impossible due to the economic situation at the time.

In 2013, the Armed Forces issued a statement saying that the reorganisation would only suffice for a reasonable defence of Swedish territory for one week. The force was to include the following units:

As of 2022 the 1st Division was reintroduced as an operational unit. The Division currently contains four brigades; The Norbotten Brigade (Norbottensbrigaden NMekB 19), The South Scanian Brigade (Södra Skånska Brigaden MekB 7, The Life Guards Brigade (Livgardesbrigaden IB 1) and The Skaraborg Brigade (Skaraborgsbrigaden MekB 4)

As of 2024 the Army's units of the Operational Organisation are:

- 1st Division (1. divisionen – being raised)
  - 1st Division Staff – in Skövde (1. divisionsstaben)
    - 1st Divisional Staff Battalion (1. divisionstabsbataljonen)
    - 1st Divisional Electronic Warfare Battalion (1. divisionstelekrigbataljon)
    - 1st Divisional Support Battalion (1. divisionsunderhållsbataljonen) Reduced to company size
    - 1st Divisional Engineer Battalion (1. divisionsingenjörbataljonen) Reduced to company size
- Life Guards (LG), in Kungsängen
  - Life Guards Battalion (Livbataljonen)
    - Staff and support company, life guards company, life guards mounted squadron, cavalry mounted squadron, might be included in the Life Guards Brigade
  - 1st Military Police Battalion (1. militärpolisbataljonen)
    - Personnel protection company, two military police companies, investigation group
  - 1st Infantry Brigade or Life Guards Brigade (1. infanteribrigaden or livgardesbrigaden IB 1)
    - 1st Motorised Infantry Battalion (1. motoriserade skyttebataljon)
      - Staff and support company, three Patria AMV mechanised companies, support company, signals company
    - 2nd Motorised Infantry Battalion (2. motoriserade skyttebataljon – being raised)
  - 13th Security Battalion (13. säkerhetsbataljonen)
    - Staff and operations squadron, land security squadron, sea security company
- Life Regiment Hussars (K 3), in Karlsborg
  - 31st Ranger Battalion
    - Staff and support squadron, three ranger squadrons, logistic squadron
  - 32nd Intelligence Battalion
    - Functions squadron, two reconnaissance squadrons, parachute ranger company
- Norrland Dragoon Regiment (K 4), in Arvidsjaur
  - Norrland Ranger Battalion (Norrlandsjägarbataljon)
- Skaraborg Regiment (P 4), in Skövde
  - Skaraborg Brigade (Skaraborgsbrigaden MekB 4 – parts of the brigade being raised)
    - 4th Brigade Staff (4. brigadstaben)
      - 4th Brigade Headquarters Company (4. brigadledningskompaniet) Organised from the 11th Command Battalion
      - 4th Brigade Reconnaissance Company (4. brigadspaningskompaniet)
      - 4th Brigade Signals Company (4. brigadsambandskompaniet) Organised from the 12th Signals Battalion
      - 4th Brigade Air Defence Company (4. brigadluftvärnskompaniet)
    - 41st Armored Battalion (41. pansarbataljonen)
      - Staff and support company, two Stridsvagn 122 tank companies, two CV90 mechanised companies, logistic company
    - 42nd Armored Battalion (42. Pansarbataljonen)
      - Staff and support company, two Stridsvagn 122 tank companies, two CV90 mechanised companies, logistic company
    - 43rd Mechanised Battalion (43. mekaniserade Bataljonen – being raised)
    - 4th Brigade Support Battalion (4. brigadunderhållsbataljonen) Organised from the 1st Logistics Battalion
    - 4th Brigade Engineer Battalion (4. brigadingenjörbataljonen) Organised from the 21st Engineer Battalion
    - 4th Brigade Artillery Battalion (4. brigadartilleribataljonen) Likely organised from the 82nd Artillery Battalion as the 91st and 92nd are being raised
    - 4th Armored Transport Company (4. stridsvagnstransportkompaniet)
      - Organised from the 1st Heavy Transport Company (1. tungtransportkompaniet)
- South Scanian Regiment (P 7), in Revingehed
  - South Skåne Brigade (Södra kånska brigaden MekB 7 – parts of the brigade are being raised)
    - 7th Brigade Staff (7. brigadstaben)
      - 7th Brigade Headquarters Company (7. brigadledningskompaniet)
      - 7th Brigade Reconnaissance Company (7. brigadspaningskompaniet)
      - 7th Brigade Signals Company (7. brigadsambandskompaniet)
      - 7th Brigade Air Defence Company (7. brigadluftvärnskompaniet)
    - 71st Motorised Infantry Battalion (71. motoriserade skyttebataljonen)
      - Staff and support company, three Patria AMV mechanised companies, logistic company
    - 72nd Armored Battalion (72. pansarbataljonen)
      - Staff and support company, two Stridsvagn 122 tank companies, two CV90 mechanised companies, logistic company
    - 73rd Mechanised Battalion (73. mekaniserade bataljonen – being raised)
    - 7th Brigade Support Battalion (7. brigadunderhållsbataljonen)
    - 7th Brigade Engineer Battalion (7. brigadingenjörbataljonen)
    - 7th Brigade Artillery Battalion (7. brigadartilleribataljonen)
    - 7th Armored Transport Company (7. stridsvagnstransportkompaniet)
- Dalarna Regiment (I 13), in Falun
  - 131st Infantry Battalion (131. skyttebataljonen – being raised)
  - 132nd Infantry Battalion (132. skyttebataljonen – being raised)
- Gotland Regiment (P 18), in Visby
  - 181st Armored Battalion (181. pansarbataljonen)
    - Staff and support company, Stridsvagn 122 tank company, CV90 mechanised company, logistic company
- Norrbotten Regiment (I 19), in Boden
  - Norbotten Brigade (Norbottensbrigaden NMekB 19 – parts of the brigade are being raised)
    - 19th Brigade Staff (19. brigadstaben)
      - 19th Brigade Headquarters Company (19. brigadledningskompaniet) Organised from the 11th Command Battalion
      - 19th Brigade Reconnaissance Company (19. brigadspaningskompaniet) equipped with CV90
      - 19th Brigade Signals Company (19. brigadsambandskompaniet)
      - 19th Brigade Air Defence Company (19. brigadluftvärnskompaniet)
    - 191st Armored Battalion (191. pansarbataljonen)
      - Staff and support company, two Stridsvagn 122 tank companies, two CV90 mechanised companies, logistic company
    - 192nd Armored Battalion (192. pansarbataljonen)
      - Staff and support company, two Stridsvagn 122 tank companies, two CV90 mechanised companies, logistic company
    - 193 Mechanised Battalion (193. mekaniserade bataljonen – being raised)
    - 19th Brigade Support Battalion (19. brigadunderhållsbataljonen) Organised from the 2nd Logistics Battalion
    - 19th Brigade Engineer Battalion (19. brigadingenjörbataljonen) Organised from the 22nd Engineer Battalion
    - 19th Brigade Artillery Battalion (19. brigadartilleribataljonen) Likely organised from the 81st Artillery Battalion as the 91st and 92nd are being raised
    - 19th Armored Transport Company (19. stridsvagnstransportkompaniet) Organised from the 1st Heavy Transport Company
- Västernorrland Regiment (I 21), in Sollefteå
  - 211th Infantry Battalion (211. skyttebataljonen – being raised)
  - Jämtland Ranger Corps (Jämtlands fältjägarkår), in Östersund
    - 212th Infantry Battalion (212. skyttebataljonen – being raised)
- Boden Artillery Regiment (A 8), in Boden
  - 81st Artillery Battalion (81. artilleribataljon)
    - Staff and logistic battery, three Archer batteries, sensor battery
  - 82nd Artillery Battalion (82. artilleribataljon)
    - Staff and logistic battery, three Archer batteries, sensor battery
- Bergslagen Artillery Regiment (A 9), in Kristinehamn
  - 91st Artillery Battalion (91. artilleribataljonen – being raised)
    - Staff and logistic battery, three Archer batteries, sensor battery
  - 92nd Artillery Battalion (92. artilleribataljonen – being raised)
    - Staff and logistic battery, three Archer batteries, sensor battery
- Göta Engineer Regiment (Ing 2), in Eksjö
  - 21st Engineer Battalion (21. ingenjörbataljon)
    - Staff and logistic company, two engineer companies, machine/bridging company
  - 22nd Engineer Battalion (22. ingenjörbataljon)
    - Staff and logistic company, two engineer companies, machine/bridging company
- Air Defence Regiment (Lv 6), in Halmstad
  - 61st Air Defence Battalion (61. luftvärnsbataljonen)
  - 62nd Air Defence Battalion (62. luftvärnsbataljonen)
- Göta Logistic Regiment (T 2), in Skövde
  - 1st Logistic Battalion (1. logistikbataljonen)
  - 2nd Logistic Battalion (2. logistikbataljonen)
  - 1st Medical Reinforcement Company (1. sjukvårdsförstärkningskompaniet)
  - 2nd Medical Reinforcement Company (2. sjukvårdsförstärkningskompaniet)
  - 1st Traffic and Movement Control Company (1. trafik- och transportledningskompaniet)

The following Armed Forces' establishments provide additional units for the Rapid Reaction Organisation:

- Command Regiment (LedR), in Enköping
  - Command Battalion (Ledningsplatsbataljonen)
    - Three Staff companies, public affairs/ interpreter/ combat camera company
  - Signal Battalion (Sambandsbataljonen)
    - Staff company, two signal companies, signal reinforcement company
  - Electronic Warfare Battalion (Telekrigsbataljonen)
  - Psychological Operations (Psykologiska operationer)
  - Meteorology and Oceanography Center (Meteorologi- och oceanograficentrum)
- Armed Forces Centre for Defence Medicine, in Gothenburg
  - 1st Hospital Company (1. sjukhuskompaniet)
  - 2nd Hospital Company (2. sjukhuskompaniet)
- National CBRN Defence Centre (SkyddC), in Umeå
  - 1st CBRN defence Company (1. CBRN-kompaniet)
- Armed Forces Technical School, in Halmstad
  - 1st Operational Logistics Battalion (1. Operativa logistikbataljon)

=== Swedish Army operational organization graphic ===
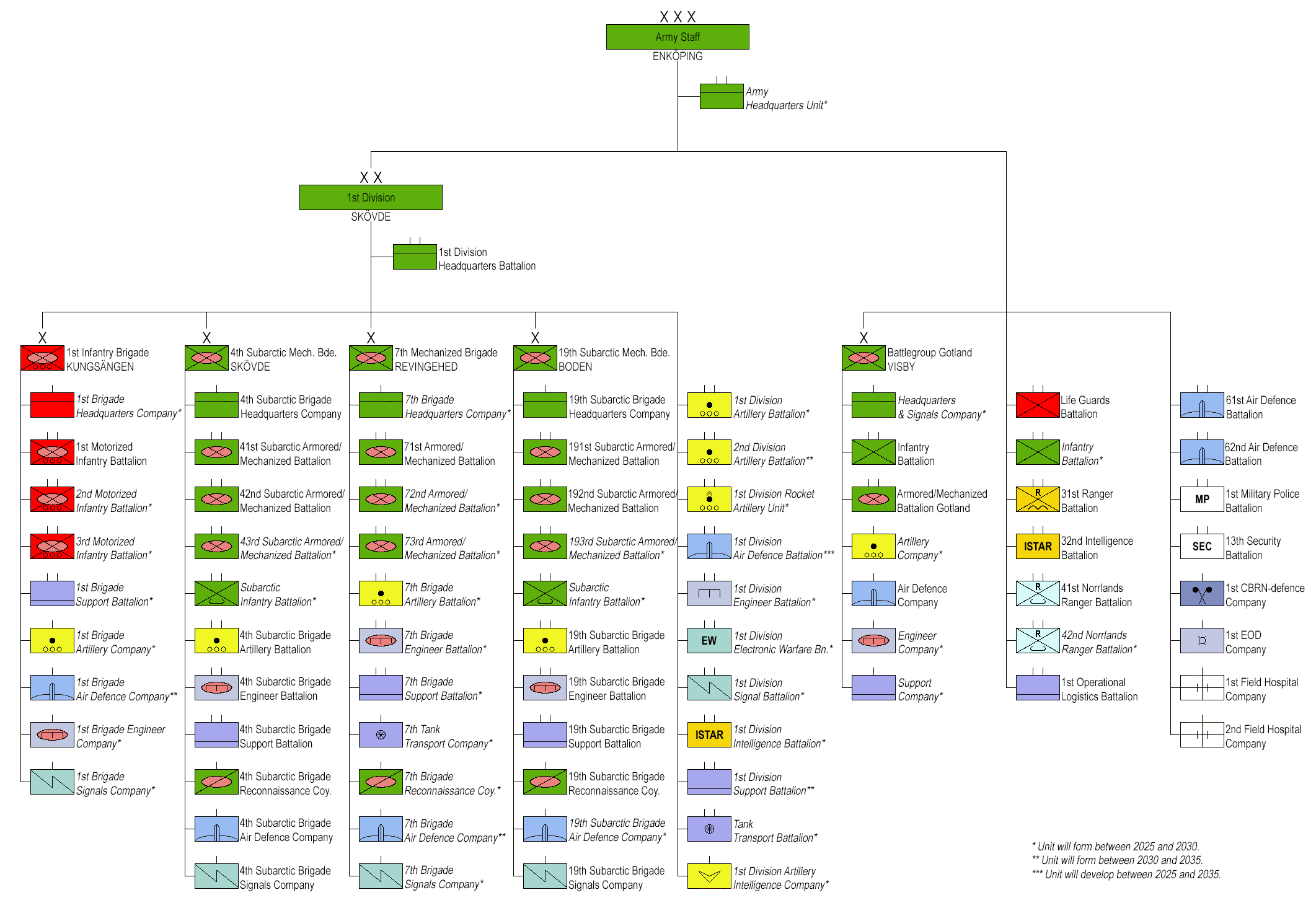
Swedish Army operational organisation 2026-2030 (click to enlarge)

== Size ==
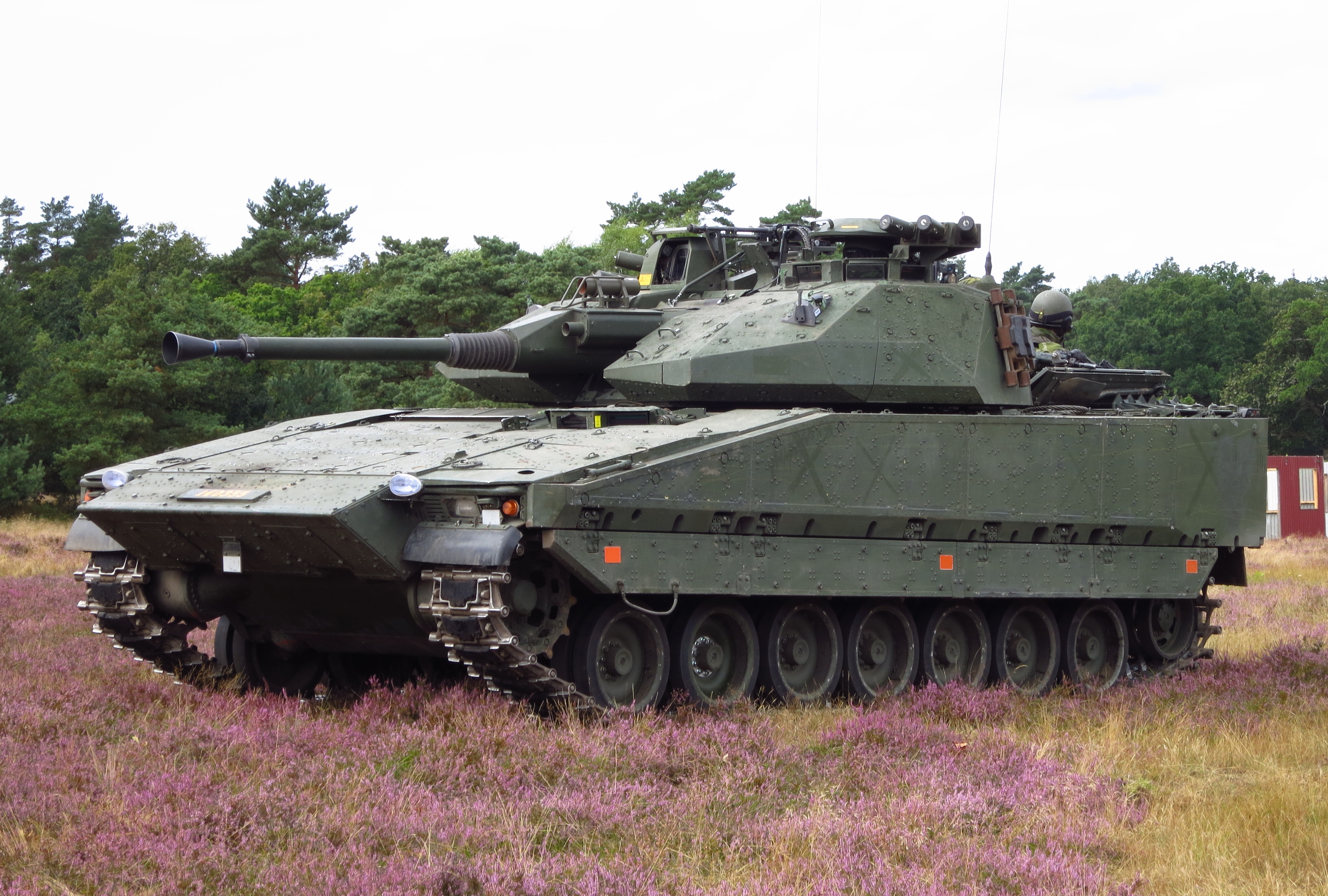
A Combat Vehicle 90

The army on active service during most of the 20th century only consisted of conscript receiving their basic training (at the most one year for privates), and conscripts called up for refreshers (at the most one month for privates) with intervals of at least 4–6 years. During WWII smaller or larger parts of the wartime establishment were also called up for periodical stand-by duty (up to 6 months). The figures for total strength below refer to the total force which could be mobilised. Between the introduction of universal conscription in 1902 until the start of World War II, the army was usually maintained at a consistent strength of 100,000 men, with two-thirds of the force being conscripts for two years. From 1942 onwards, the Swedish government embarked upon a massive and ambitious militarisation programme in which conscription was strictly enforced and compulsory service was extended. The basic training for privates was set at 12 months, for future conscript sergeants intended to become platoon leaders (mainly sixth form graduates) 18 months, and for future conscript officers 24 months. These periods were gradually reduced, and the ranks were raised, until it was the same period for all conscripts shortly before conscription was suspended in 2009. This combined with propaganda about conscription being a part of social duty and defending the Swedish principle of folkhemmet, led to an army a size of about 700,000 active duty soldiers that could be mobilised in late 1945. Since the late winter of 1945 the size of the army was slowly decreased as entire reserve battalions and brigades were gradually demobilised, and by late 1947 the size of the army was around 170,000 soldiers who could be mobilised and was planned to stabilise at such a quantity of personnel.

However, due to the rise in tensions between the East and West over the political landscape of Europe, the threat from the Soviet Union in 1949 and 1950, coinciding with the start of the Cold War, led to a return to the militaristic policy by the Swedish government. From 1950 until around 1976 the size of the army was at an average of 250,000 soldiers with a peak of 400,000 mobilisable soldiers during the late 1950s and early 1960s. The rules were badly enforced, but dodging the draft was punishable with imprisonment.

During the 1980s the size of the army was around 180,000 soldiers and was slowly increased as time progressed until around 1988. The end of the Cold War led to a massive restructuring of the Swedish Army. Every year after 1988, the Army discharged around 40,000 conscripts and recruited only 20,000, so that by 1995 the size was down to 80,000 soldiers. Around this time the compulsory service obligation was further reduced to 10 months, reserve service became more flexible, and changes made in enforcement so that forceful enforcement became withdrawn as policy. By 2004 the size of the Swedish Army was down to 60,000 soldiers, and in 2013, three years after the end of conscription, the size was at an all-time low of just 16,000 soldiers, though the army plans to reach a level of 50,000 professional soldiers by 2020, mostly through a large media campaigns. A number of previously disbanded regiments will also be re-raised (Dalarna Regiment, Västernorrland Regiment, Norrland Dragoon Regiment, and Bergslagen Artillery Regiment) with the Jämtland Ranger Regiment re-raised as a battalion of Västernorrland Regiment.

== Recruitment ==
From the 17th century until 1901, Swedish Army recruitment was based upon the allotment system. In 1812, conscription was introduced for all males between age 20 and 25 to serve in the armed forces twelve days a year, increased in 1858 to four weeks per two years. The allotment system was abolished in 1901 and replaced with universal conscription for all males. All personnel were drafted as conscripts for a year of conscription, after which the unit the soldier trained with was put in reserve. Upon completion of conscript service with sufficient service marks, conscripts are eligible to apply for commissioned officer training, NCO/Warrant Officer or from 2007 stay in the Army as a professional private, mainly to be employed in the Nordic Battle Group. The army has employed soldiers for UN service on short time contracts since the 1950s for service abroad.

From July 2010 until 2017, the Swedish Army was an all-professional fighting force. The government announced on 2 March 2017 that conscription was going to be reinstated. Of a pool of around 13,000 men and women born 1999, 4,000 were going to be selected for conscription starting January 2018. The government stated that the number of conscripts may increase in response to foreign events.

== Ranks ==
Commissioned officer ranks

The rank insignia of commissioned officers.

NATO code	OF-10	OF-9	OF-8	OF-7	OF-6	OF-5	OF-4	OF-3	OF-2	OF-1
Swedish Army
Swedish Army		General	Generallöjtnant	Generalmajor	Brigadgeneral	Överste	Överstelöjtnant	Major	Kapten	Löjtnant	Fänrik

Other ranks

The rank insignia of non-commissioned officers and enlisted personnel.

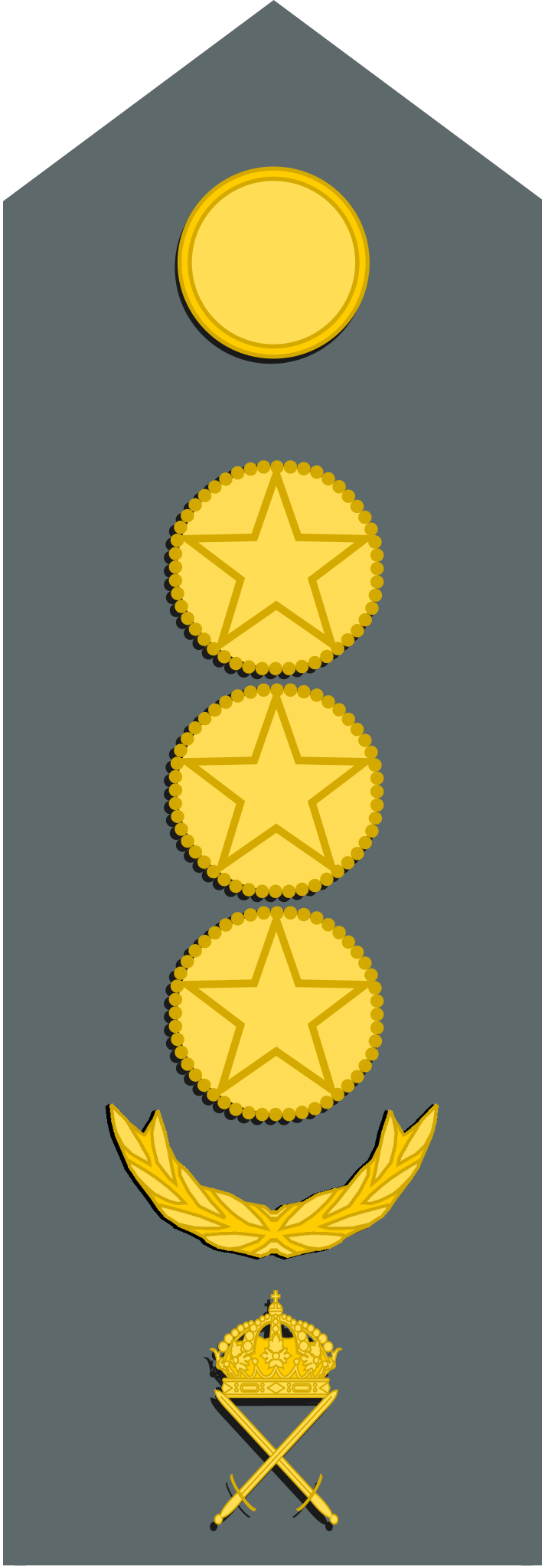
NATO code	OR-9	OR-8	OR-7		OR-6		OR-5		OR-4	OR-3	OR-2				OR-1
Swedish Army
Swedish Army	Regementsförvaltare	Förvaltare	Överfanjunkare	Fanjunkare	Översergeant	Sergeant	Överfurir	Furir	Korpral	Vicekorpral	Menig 4	Menig 3	Menig 2	Menig 1	Menig

== See also ==
- Military ranks of the Swedish Armed Forces
- Royal Swedish Academy of War Sciences
- Swedish Army Museum
- List of wars involving Sweden
- List of Swedish field marshals
- Military district (Sweden)
- List of Swedish military commanders
- List of Swedish regiments
- List of military aircraft of Sweden
- Allotment system
- List of equipment of the Swedish Army
- Swedish military uniforms
- United Nations Interim Force in Lebanon
- Swedish intervention in Persia
