= Swedish Infantry Officers' College =

Swedish Infantry Officers’ College
- Infanteriets officershögskola
- Coats of arms 1981–1995.
- Active: 1915–1995
- Country: Sweden
- Allegiance: Swedish Armed Forces
- Branch: Swedish Army
- Type: Infantry
- Role: College
- Size: School
- Part of: Halland Regiment (1962–1991); Army's Infantry and Cavalry Center (1991–1995)
- Garrison/HQ: Linköping
- Motto: Posse Est Velle ("To be willing is to be able")
- March: "The Thin Red Line" (Alford)

Insignia
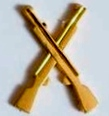
- Branch insignia m/1960

The Swedish Infantry Officers’ College (Swedish: Infanteriets officershögskola, InfOHS) was an officers’ college in the Swedish Army which operated in various forms from 1915 to 1995. The staff was located to Linköping Garrison.

== History ==
The Infantry Officers’ College (Infanteriets officershögskola) was formed in 1878 as the Infantry Volunteer School (Infanteriets volontärskola), then located to Karlsborg. On 20 October 1915, remaining parts of the school were reorganized into the Infantry Officer Candidate School (Infanteriets officersaspirantskola, IOAS). At Karlsborg, the school operated until 1927, when it was relocated to Linköping according to the Defence Act of 1925. In 1940, the school was relocated to Karlstad, however, during the years 1941-1942 the education was canceled. On 21 September 1942, the school was relocated to Solna. On 29 September 1945, the school was reorganized into the Infantry Cadet School (Infanteriets kadettskola, InfKS). When the school was relocated to Halmstad, it was at the same time, on 1 January 1962, reorganize into the Infantry [Cadet and] Officer Candidate School (Infanteriets kadett- och aspirantskola, InfKAS). In Halmstad, the school was subordinated to the commanding officer of Halland Regiment. Through the Ny befälsordning ("New Command System") reform, the school was reorganized on 1 June 1981 into the Infantry Officers’ College (Infanteriets officershögskola, InfOHS).

Through the 1988 Defense Investigation, the Riksdag decided that all officer colleges within the army service branches would be dissolved as independent authorities, and instead be incorporated into service branch centers (truppslagscentrum). For the Infantry Officers’ College, it meant that the school was incorporated into the Army's Infantry and Cavalry Center (Arméns infanteri- och kavallericentrum, InfKavC). In addition to the Infantry Officers’ College, the Infantry and Cavalry Officers’ College (Infanteriets och Kavalleriets officershögskola, Inf/KavOHS) and the Swedish Infantry Combat School (InfSS) in Army's Infantry and Cavalry Center were also included. In 1993, the school was relocated to Linköping. On 1 July 1995, the Army's Infantry and Cavalry Center was amalgamated with the Swedish Army Armoured Center and formed the Army Brigade Center (Arméns brigadcentrum, BrigC). Through this reorganization, on 1 July 1995, three new army-based schools, Combat School North (Stridsskola Nord, SSN), Combat School Middle (Stridsskola Mitt, SSM) and Combat School South (Stridsskola Syd, SSS), were formed, where the Infantry Officers’ College together with the Infantry Combat School formed the Combat School Middle.

The Infantry Officers’ College continued to be part of the Combat School Middle until 31 December 1998, when the education was taken over centrally by the Military Academy Karlberg (MHS K), Military Academy Halmstad (MHS H) and Military Academy Östersund (MHS Ö). Remaining parts of Combat School Middle and Combat School South formed on 1 January 1999 the Land Warfare Centre.

== Operations ==
When the school was formed in 1915 as the Infantry Officer Candidate School (Infanteriets officersaspirantskola), it was responsible for the basic education of the infantry's reserve and commissioned officers. When the school was reorganized in 1945 into the Infantry Cadet School (Infanteriets kadettskola), the school trained conscript officers and reserve officers, and during its first year, also future commissioned officers in the infantry. From 1962, the school became responsible for the commissioned officers' basic education from the fourth month of the conscripts training. With the Ny befälsordning ("New Order of Command") reform, the school from 1981 became responsible for the first year of the then two-year education of commissioned officers. In addition, the school was also responsible for the basic officers education of reserve officers and conscript officers. When the Combat School Middle (Stridsskola Mitt, SSM) was formed in 1995, the new school became responsible for the basic education of officers belonging to the infantry, cavalry and armoured troops from units within the Middle Military District (Milo M). On 31 December 1998, the basic education ceased within the respective military branch and in the service branches of the army. Instead, on 1 January 1999, the officers training was gathered at three new military academies, Military Academy Karlberg (MHS K), Military Academy Halmstad (MHS H) and Military Academy Östersund (MHS Ö).

== Garrisons and training areas ==
When the school was founded in 1878 as the Infantry Volunteer School (Infanteriets volontärskola), was located to Karlsborg Fortress. In 1879 the school buildings were completed in direct connection to the fortress. In connection with the Defence Act of 1925, the school was relocated on 10 October 1927, to Linköping Garrison, where barracks were taken over from the disbanded 2nd Life Grenadier Regiment (I 5). A decommissioning organization remained in Karlsborg until 31 December 1927. In 1936, the school barracks in Karlsborg were taken over by Västgöta Wing (F 6). On 7 October 1940, the school was relocated to Karlstad Garrison, where it co-located with Värmland Regiment (I 2). However, it was only two years later, on 21 September 1942, relocated to Karlberg Palace. In connection with the Defence Act of 1948, the school was relocated to Bagartorp on 1 September 1949, where the barracks were taken over from the disbanded First Commissariat Company (Första intendenturkompaniet, Int 1). On 7 October 1940, the school was relocated from Bagartorp to Halmstad Garrison, where it was co-located with Halland Regiment (I 16). In connection with the 1988 Defense Investigation, the school was relocated on 1 September 1993 to Linköping Garrison, where it operated until 1995.

== Heraldry and traditions ==
=== Coat of arms ===
The coat of the arms of the Swedish Infantry Cadet and Officer Candidate School (Infanteriets kadett- och aspirantskola, InfKAS) 1961–1981. Blazon: "Two muskets in saltire or - between the butts a scroll or with the text POSSE EST VELLE sable - inside an open chaplet of laurels vert, berries gules and under a royal crown proper (the cadet crown)".

The coat of the arms of the Swedish Infantry Officers’ College (Infanteriets officershögskola, InfKAS) 1981–1995. This coat of arms was later used by the Combat School Middle (Stridsskola Mitt, SSM) 1995–1999. Blazon: "Azure, two muskets in saltire or. The shield surrounded by an open chaplet of laurels or".

Coat of arms of the Swedish Infantry Cadet and Officer Candidate School (Infanteriets kadett- och aspirantskola, InfKAS) 1961–1981.

Coat of arms of the Swedish Infantry Officers’ College (Infanteriets officershögskola, InfKAS) 1981–1995.

== Commanding officers ==
- 1915–1916: Pontus Reuterswärd
- 1917–1919: Ernst af Sandeberg
- 1920–1924: ?
- 1924–1926: Per Adolf Erlandsson
- 1926–1929: Curt Vogel
- 1929–1932: Hans Palmaer
- 1932–1935: Gillis Graffman
- 1935–1937: Carl Björkman
- 1937–1939: Ivar Göthberg
- 1939–1940: Carl Axel Grewell
- 1940–1941: Sven Nordenberg
- 1942–1944: Harry Gerlach
- 1944–1948: Erik Drakenberg
- 1948–1951: Wilhelm af Klinteberg
- 1951–1954: Curt Alsterlund
- 1954–1957: Jan von Horn
- 1957–1960: Carl von Mentzer
- 1961–1963: Bele Jansson
- 1963–1967: Torsten Nordin
- 1967–1970: Gunnar Åberg
- 1971–1972: Carl-Gustaf Tiselius (acting)
- 1972–1976: Carl-Gustaf Tiselius
- 1976–1982: Kjell Widberg
- 1982–1987: Kaj Sjösten
- 1987–1989: Per Källström
- 1990–1992: Hans Hacksell
- 1992–1993: Georg Aminoff
- 1994–1995: Håkan Nestor

== Names, designations and locations ==
Names	Translation	From		To
Infanteriets volontärskola	[Swedish] Infantry Volunteer School	1878	–	1915-10-19
Infanteriets officersaspirantskola	[Swedish] Infantry Officer Candidate School	1915-10-20	–	1945-09-27
Infanteriets kadettskola	[Swedish] Infantry Cadet School	1945-09-28	–	1961-12-31
Infanteriets kadett- och aspirantskola	[Swedish] Infantry [Cadet and] Officer Candidate School	1962-01-01	–	1981-05-30
Infanteriets officershögskola	[Swedish] Infantry Officers’ College	1981-06-01	–	1995-06-30
Designations		From		To
IOAS		1915-10-20	–	1945-09-27
InfKS		1945-09-28	–	1961-12-31
InfKAS		1962-01-01	–	1981-05-30
InfOHS		1981-06-01	–	1995-06-30
Location		From		To
Karlsborg Garrison		1915-10-20	–	1927-10-09
Linköping Garrison		1927-10-10	–	1940-10-06
Karlstad Garrison		1940-10-07	–	1942-09-20
Stockholm Garrison		1942-09-21	–	1961-12-31
Halmstad Garrison		1962-01-01	–	1993-08-31
Linköping Garrison		1993-09-01	–	1995-06-30
