= Swedish Armoured Troops School =

- Pansartruppskolan
- Active: 1944–1981
- Country: Sweden
- Allegiance: Swedish Armed Forces
- Branch: Swedish Army
- Type: Armoured Troops
- Role: Specialised school
- Garrison/HQ: Skövde garrison
- March: "Pansarkamrater" (Green) (Note: The march was established on 26 April 1976.)

Insignia
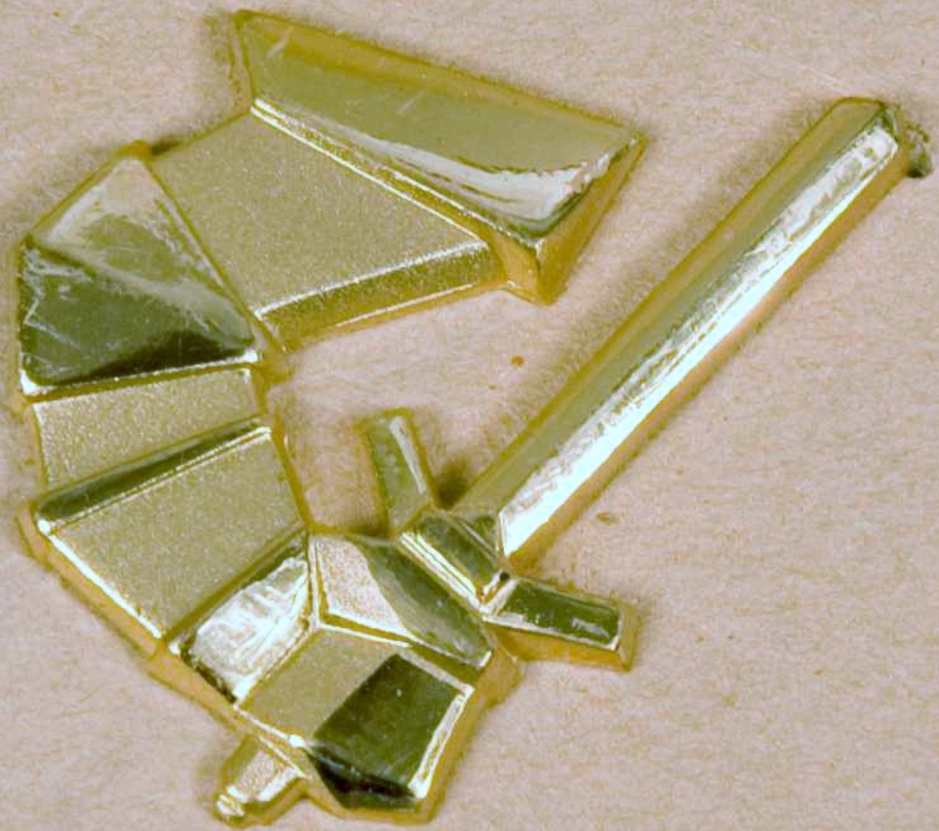
- Branch insignia m/1963

The Swedish Armoured Troops School (Swedish: Pansartruppskolan, PS) was a school of the Swedish Armoured Troops in the Swedish Army which operated in various forms the years 1944–1981. The school was located in Skövde garrison in Skövde.

== History ==
The Swedish Armoured Troops School was established on 1 April 1944 in Skövde Garrison. It initially had an annual company commander course and a non-commissioned officer course, both about two months long. In addition, there were special courses and trial activities for the military branch have been conducted. The school was located in Skövde in connection with Skaraborg Regiment (P 4). Exercises took place on Kråk's proving ground. In the 1950s, the courses looked as follows: battalion commander course, Pa-01, 3 weeks; company commander course, Pa-02, 5 weeks; the Swedish Armor Corps Officers' School (Pansarofficersskolan, POS), 31 weeks; non-commissioned officer course, Pa-06, 9 weeks; reserve officer course, 2 weeks; special courses.

On 1 April 1963, the Swedish Armor Corps Officers' School (Pansarofficersskolan, POS) was added to the school. In 1966, the school moved from P 4's barracks to Klagstorp outside Skövde. In connection with the disbandment of Göta Life Guards (P 1) on 30 June 1980, the Swedish Armoured Troops Cadet and Officer Candidate School was relocated to Skövde. There the Swedish Armoured Troops School was amalgamated with the Swedish Armoured Troops Cadet and Officer Candidate School and formed the Swedish Armoured Troops Combat School (Pansartruppernas stridsskola, PS) on 1 June 1981.

=== Swedish Armor Corps Officers' School ===
Swedish Armor Corps Officers' School (Swedish: Pansarofficersskolan, POS) was established on 15 September 1944, and was originally located at the Swedish Infantry Gunnery School at Rosersberg Castle. From 1948, parts of the school were also transferred to Skövde, and from 12 October 1954, the entire school was placed in Skövde. On 1 April 1963, the school was amalgamated and became organizational a part of the Swedish Armoured Troops School.

== Barracks and training areas ==
When the Swedish Armoured Troops School was established in 1944, the school was located on the first floor of the barracks II at Skaraborg Regiment (P 4/Fo 35) in Skövde. From the 1950s, the school was moved to barracks III. In 1966, a refurbishment of the barracks began, which led to the relocation of the school on 10 March 1966, from the barracks area to Klagstorp Manor, which lies in the southern part of the proving ground. In 1980, parts of the school were moved back to the Skaraborg Regiment's barracks area, and were placed in barracks II, where the school disposed of the two top floors and the attic. In 1986, the school left the Skaraborg Regiment's barracks area, and instead, school activities were moved into the new school building at Heden.

== Heraldry and traditions ==
On 26 April 1976, "Pansarkamrater" ("Armored Comrades") was adopted as a march. The march was taken over in 1992 by the Swedish Army Armoured Center (PaC). After the Swedish Army Armoured Center was disbanded on 30 June 1995, the march was taken over from 1 July 1995 by the Combat School South (Stridsskola Syd, SSS). After the Land Warfare Centre was established on 1 January 1999, the new school came to adopt "Pansarkamrater" as a march.

== Commanding officers ==
Commanding officers of the Swedish Armoured Troops School.

- 1944–1944 – Major Arne Francke
- 1944–1949 – Major Hans Malmgren
- 1949–1952 – Major Åke Wikland
- 1952–1955 – Lieutenant Colonel Bernt Juhlin
- 1955–1956 – Major Karl-Henrik Berg
- 1956–1961 – Major Lars Lavén
- 1961–1963 – Major Nils Isaksson
- 1963–1966 – Colonel Hugo Cederschiöld
- 1966–1967 – Colonel Gustaf Peyron
- 1967–1968 – Colonel Per Björkman
- 1968–1970 – Colonel Stig Colliander
- 1970–1974 – Colonel Per-Gunnar Brissman
- 1974–1980 – Colonel Hans Nilsson

== Names, designations and locations ==
| Name | Translation | From | | To |
|---|---|---|---|---|
| Pansartruppskolan | Swedish Armoured Troops School | 1944-04-01 | – | 1981-05-31 |
| Designation | | From | | To |
| PS | | 1944-04-01 | – | 1981-05-31 |
| Locations | | From | | To |
| Skövde garrison | | 1944-04-01 | – | 1966-02-28 |
| Skövde Garrison/Klagstorp Manor | | 1966-03-01 | – | 1981-05-31 |

== See also ==
- Swedish Armoured Troops Cadet and Officer Candidate School
