= Land Warfare Centre =

Land Warfare Centre may refer to:

- Land Warfare Centre (Australia)
- Land Warfare Centre (Sweden)
- Land Warfare Centre (United Kingdom)
