= Swedish Infantry Combat School =

- Infanteriets stridsskola
- Coats of arms 1982–1991.
- Active: 1874–1995
- Country: Sweden
- Allegiance: Swedish Armed Forces
- Branch: Swedish Army
- Type: Infantry
- Size: School
- Part of: Life Grenadier Regiment (1961–1991); Army's Infantry and Cavalry Center (1991–1995)
- Garrison/HQ: Borensberg
- March: "Gå på marsch" (Sernklef) (Note: The march was established on 26 April 1976. The march was shared with the Swedish Army's Infantry and Cavalry Center (Arméns infanteri- och kavallericentrum, InfKavC) from 1992 to 1995. In 1995, the march was taken over by the Combat School Middle (Stridsskola Mitt, SSM). After the Combat School Middle was disbanded in 1998, it was established as traditional march for the Land Warfare Centre on 22 March 1999.)

Insignia
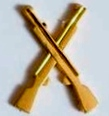
- Branch insignia m/1960

The Swedish Infantry Combat School (Swedish: Infanteriets stridsskola, InfSS) was a combat arms school of the Swedish Army which operated in various forms from 1874 to 1995. The school was located at Kvarns bruk north of Borensberg.

== History ==
The Swedish Infantry Combat School (Infanteriets stridsskola, InfSS) originated from the Swedish Infantry Gunnery School (Infanteriskjutskolan, SS) which was formed in 1878 in Stockholm. Although it was the school's official name, it also came to be called the Shooting School for the Infantry and the Cavalry (Skjutskolan för infanteriet och kavalleriet). On 1 October 1942, the school was reorganized into the Swedish Infantry Combat School. On 1 June 1953 the Swedish Army ABC-Defence School was added as a training school within the Swedish Infantry Combat School. On 1 February 1961, the school was organizationally transferred to Svea Life Guards (I 1). On 1 October 1961, the school adopted the name Infanteriets stridsskola (InfSS), when the school was relocated to Linköping. On 1 April 1963 the Infantry Officer School (Infanteriofficersskolan, IOS) and the Cavalry Officer School (Kavalleriofficerskolan, KOS) was amalgamated and came to be a part of the course of the Swedish Infantry Combat School.

Since the school constituted an independent unit of organization within the Swedish defense, it came on 1 July 1991 to organizationally be part of the Swedish Army's Infantry and Cavalry Center (Arméns infanteri- och kavallericentrum, InfKavC). The Swedish Infantry Combat School was one of three combat arms schools within the Swedish Army's Infantry and Cavalry Center. The other two schools were the Swedish Infantry Officers' College in Linköping Garrison and the Swedish Infantry and Cavalry Combat School (Infanteriets och kavalleriets stridsskola, Inf/KavSS) in Umeå Garrison.

On 30 June 1995, the three combat arms centers Swedish Army's Infantry and Cavalry Center and the Swedish Army Armoured Center, were disbanded in order to form a joint combat arms center on 1 July 1995; the Swedish Army Brigade Center (Arméns brigadcentrum, BrigC). Through this reorganization, on 1 July 1995 three new joint army schools were formed, Combat School North (Stridsskola Nord, SSN), Combat School Middle (Stridsskola Mitt, SSM) and Combat School South (Stridsskola Syd, SSS). There the Swedish Infantry Combat School with the Swedish Infantry Officers' College formed the Combat School Middle.

== Location and training areas ==
When the Swedish Infantry Gunnery School was organized in 1878, it came to be placed at Rosersberg Palace. At Rosersberg, the school was located until 1961. When the school was relocated temporarily to Linköping Garrison on 19 May 1961, a ceremony was held at Rosersberg, and on 1 July 1961 the area was handed over to the Swedish Civil Defence Board. From 1 September 1961, the school officially operated in Linköping, where it was co-located with the Life Grenadier Regiment (I 4) and located to barracks 2. On 15 May 1963, parts of the school were moved to Kvarns bruk, where the whole school was located in 1966. The facility in Kvarns bruk was taken over by the Combat School Middle.

== Heraldry and traditions ==
=== Coat of arms ===
The coat of the arms of the Swedish Infantry Combat School (Infanteriets stridsskola, InfSS) 1982–1991. Blazon: "Azure, two muskets in saltire between two letters of S, inside an open chaplet of laurels, all or".

== Commanding officers ==
- 1874–1896: ?
- 1896–1897: Otto Ewert Mauritz Wolffelt
- 1897–1902: ?
- 1902–1906: Wilhelm Bergenstråhle
- 1906–1908: Hjalmar Gardtman
- 1908–1912: Olof Melin
- 1913–1915: Peter Hegardt
- 1915–1918: Gustaf Ros
- 1918–1921: Tage af Klercker
- 1921–1926: Rikard Salwén
- 1926–1931: Hugo Cederschiöld
- 1931–1934: Gösta Ehrenborg
- 1934–1937: Nils Stenbeck
- 1937–1938: Ivar Lindquist (acting)
- 1938–1941: Ivar Lindquist
- 1941–1942: Magnus Hedenlund
- 1942–1943: Sven Ramström
- 1943–1945: Herman Levin
- 1945–1946: Sven Ramström
- 1946–1951: Regner Leuhusen
- 1951–1954: Wilhelm Reuterswärd
- 1954–1959: Bengt Uller
- 1959–1963: Sven Widegren
- 1964–1968: Åke Hultin
- 1968–1970: Iwan Hörnquist
- 1970–1974: Lennart Tollerz
- 1974–1977: Åke von Schéele
- 1977–1981: Leif Kesselmark
- 1981–1987: Torbjörn Tillman
- 1987–1989: Thor-Lennart Loo
- 1989–1991: Einar Jonasson
- 1991–1993: Kim Åkerman
- 1993–1995: Georg Aminoff

== Names, designations and locations ==
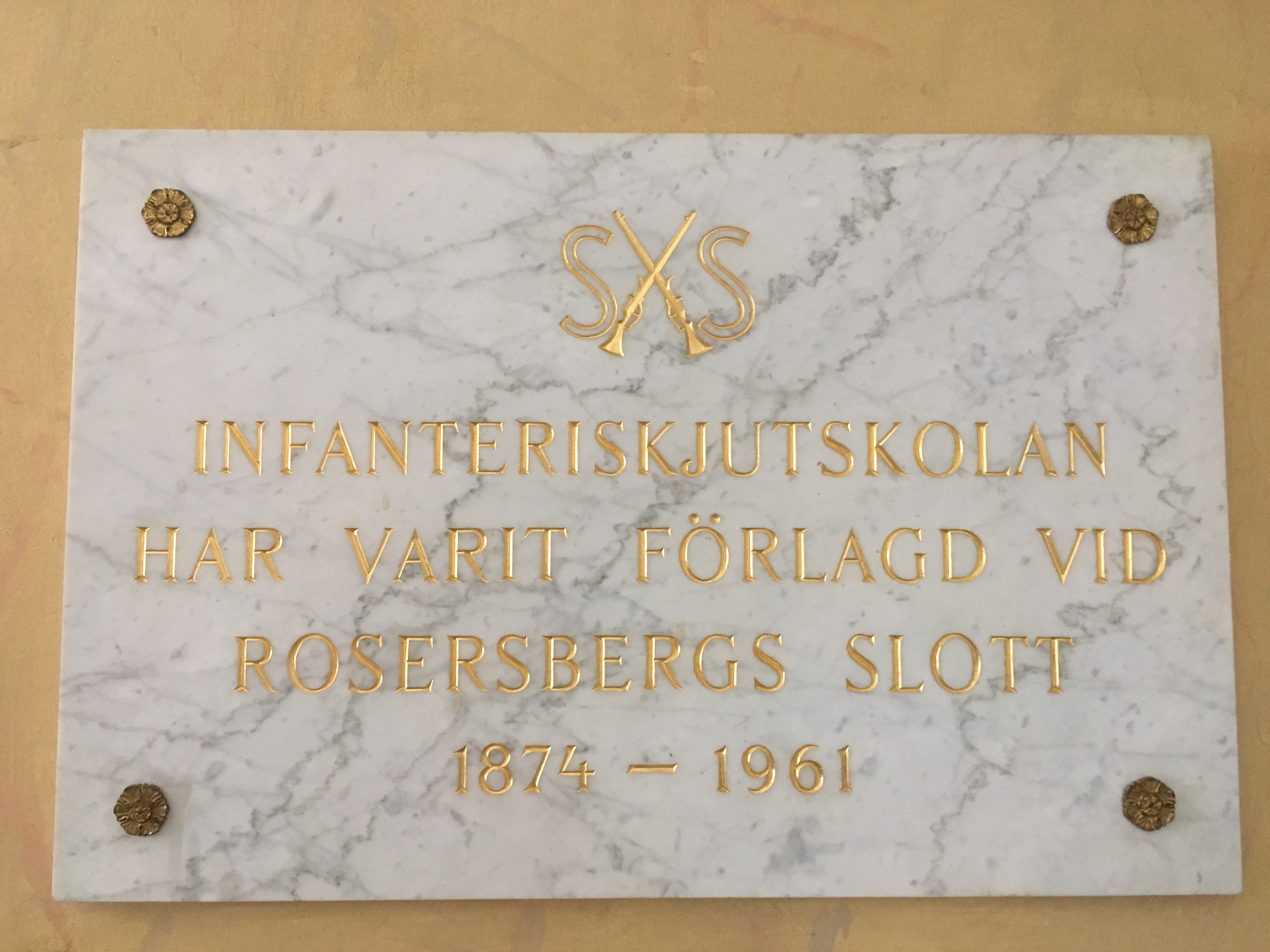
Sign of the Swedish Infantry Gunnery School's presence at Rosersberg Palace. "The Swedish Infantry Gunnery School have been placed at Rosersberg Palace 1874-1961.

Names	Translation	From		To
Infanteriskjutskolan	[Swedish] Infantry Gunnery School	1874-??-??	–	1942-09-30
Infanteriets skjutskola	[Swedish] Infantry Gunnery School	1942-10-01	–	1961-09-30
Infanteriets stridsskola	[Swedish] Infantry Combat School	1961-10-01	–	1995-06-30
Designations		From		To
SS		1874-??-??	–	1942-09-30
InfSS		1942-10-01	–	1995-06-30
Location		From		To
Stockholm Garrison		1874-??-??	–	1961-08-31
Linköping Garrison		1961-09-01	–	1966-??-??
Kvarns bruk		1963-05-15	–	1995-06-30
