= Swedish Army Armoured Center =

- Arméns pansarcentrum
- Active: 1991–1995
- Country: Sweden
- Allegiance: Swedish Armed Forces
- Branch: Swedish Army
- Type: Armoured Troops
- Role: Center
- Part of: Western Military District (1991–1993); Southern Military District (1993–1995)
- Garrison/HQ: Skövde garrison
- March: "Pansarkamrater" (Green)

Insignia
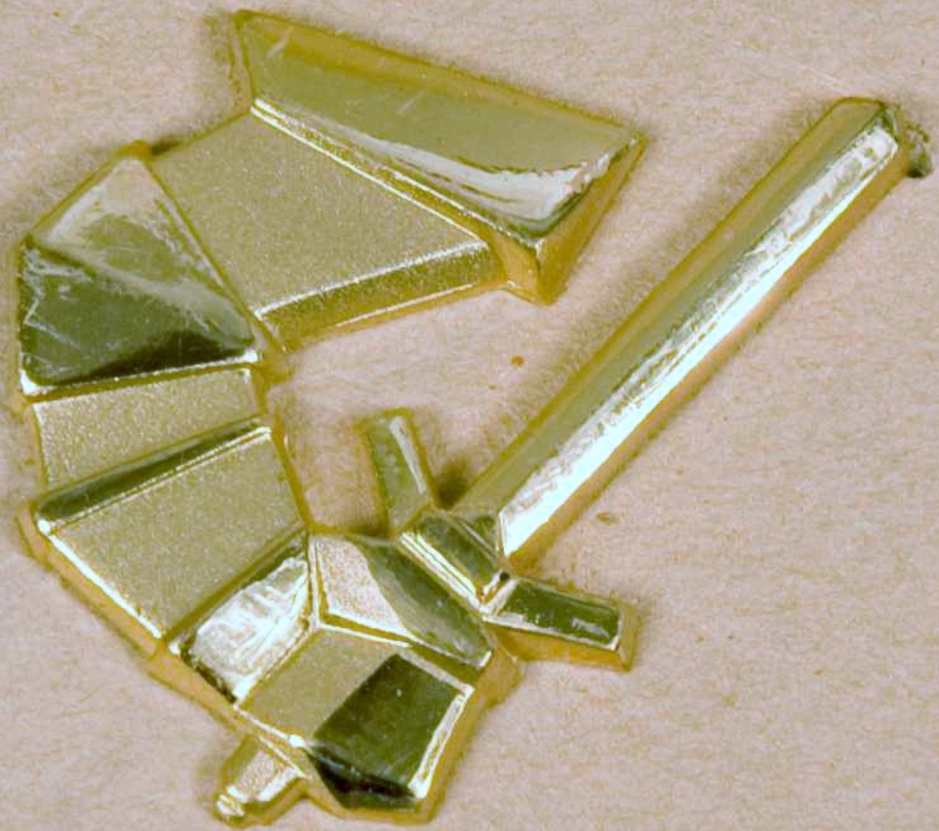
- Branch insignia m/1963

The Swedish Army Armoured Center (Swedish: Arméns pansarcentrum, PaC) was a center of the Swedish Armoured Troops within the Swedish Army which operated in from 1991 to 1995. The staff was located in Skövde garrison in Skövde, Sweden.

== History ==
The Swedish Army Armoured Center was established on 1 July 1991. This was done as a direct result of the Army Staff's reorganization when the branch divisions were relocated from Stockholm, to be part of the respective branch school. The traditions and thus tasks and organization at the Swedish Army Armoured Center thus built on the Army Staff's Armored Department – the Armored Inspectorate (Pansarinspektionen) – and the Swedish Armoured Troops Combat School (Pansartruppernas stridsskola, PS) with its closest predecessors the Swedish Armoured Troops School and the Swedish Armoured Troops Cadet and Officer Candidate School.

The Swedish Army Armoured Center was located at Klagstorp manor and the Swedish Armoured Troops Combat School, which was organized in the Swedish Army Armoured Center, moved to the same location as Skaraborg Regiment (P 4). The Swedish Army Armoured Center operated in two places; in Skövde in adjacent to the establishment around Heden, operated the Course Sections 1, 2 and 3 and the Trial Troop (Försöktruppen); at Klagstorp old manor there the LT section, the development sections and the Armored Staff (Pansarstaben) operated. There were four training sections with different goals ranging from basic officer training to training of brigade and battalion staffs. Two sections worked on development, one of materiel, the other of tactics and combat technology. Service to the school was provided by two trial companies with conscripts and materiel. The Armored Inspector, the head of the Swedish Armoured Troops Combat School and the chief of staff were based at Klagstorp.

On 1 July 1995, the Swedish Army Armoured Center in Skövde and the Swedish Army's Infantry and Cavalry Center (Arméns infanteri- och kavallericentrum, InfKavC) in Kvarn merged into one organizational unit, the Swedish Army Brigade Center (Arméns brigadcentrum, BrigC). The reason for the merger was an increased mechanization of the infantry, which began to blur the boundaries that existed between the armoured units and the infantry units.

== Heraldry and traditions ==
=== Coat of arms ===
Blazon: "Sable, an arm embowed and vambraced, in the hand a sword, all or".

=== March ===
When the center was formed on 1 July 1991, the unit march, "Pansarkamrater", was taken over from the Swedish Armoured Troops Combat School (Pansartruppernas stridsskola, PS). The unit march was taken over in 1995 by the Combat School South (Stridsskola Syd, SSS). From 1999, it is used as a unit march by the Land Warfare Centre.

=== Heritage ===
The Land Warfare Centre continues the traditions of the Swedish Army Armoured Center.

== Commanding officers ==
- 1990-07-01 – 1993-09-30: Senior colonel Stig Edgren
- 1993-10-01 – 1995-06-30: Senior colonel Alf Sandqvist

== Names, designations and locations ==
Name	Translation	From		To
Arméns pansarcentrum	Swedish Army Armoured Center	1991-07-01	–	1995-06-30
Designation		From		To
PaC		1991-07-01	–	1995-06-30
Locations		From		To
Strängnäs Garrison/Klagstorp		1991-07-01	–	1995-06-30

== See also ==
- Swedish Armoured Troops School
- Swedish Armoured Troops Cadet and Officer Candidate School
