= Swedish Armoured Troops Cadet and Officer Candidate School =

Swedish military unit (1942–1981)

- Pansartruppernas kadett- och aspirantskola
- Active: 1942–1981
- Country: Sweden
- Allegiance: Swedish Armed Forces
- Branch: Swedish Army
- Type: Armoured Troops
- Role: Specialised school
- Garrison/HQ: Skövde garrison

Insignia
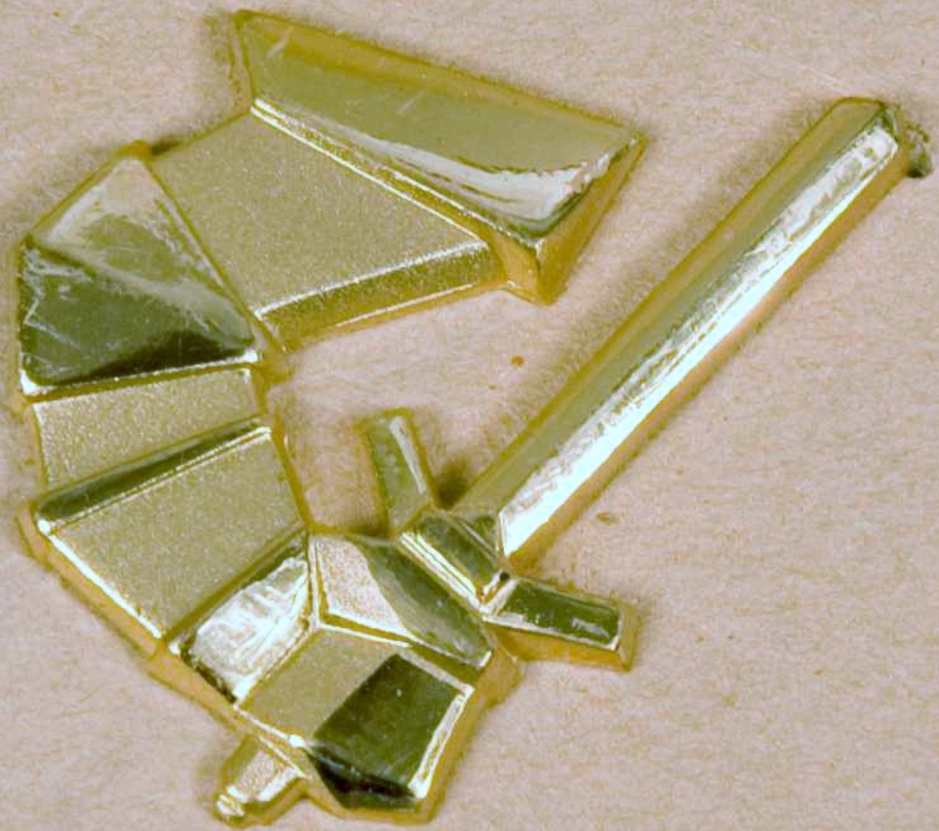
- Branch insignia m/1963

The Swedish Armoured Troops Cadet and Officer Candidate School (Swedish: Pansartruppernas kadett- och aspirantskola, PKAS) was a school of the Swedish Armoured Troops in the Swedish Army which operated in various forms the years 1942–1981. The school was located in Skövde garrison in Skövde.

== History ==
The school was established on 28 September 1942 as the Swedish Armoured Troops Officer Candidate School (Pansartruppernas officersaspirantskola, POAS) and was located in Strängnäs. On 28 September 1945, the school was reorganized into the Swedish Armoured Troops Cadet School (Pansartruppernas kadettskola, PKS). In 1946, the school was co-located with the Göta Life Guards (P 1) in Enköping. On 1 April 1961, the school was reorganized into the Swedish Armoured Troops Cadet and Officer Candidate School (Pansartruppernas kadett- och aspirantskola, PKAS).

The Government Bill 1973:135 suggested that Göta Life Guards should be disbanded. The proposal also suggested that the Swedish Armoured Troops Cadet and Officer Candidate School should be relocated to Ystad or Revinge, and be subordinated to the South Scanian Regiment (P 7). However, the issue of disbanding Göta Life Guards was delayed until 1977, when the Riksdag, through the Defence Act of 1977 and the Government Bill 1977/78:65, established the Swedish Armed Forces new basic organization.

The Göta Life Guards was disbanded on 30 June 1980. With that, the school was relocated to Skövde. There, the Swedish Armoured Troops Cadet and Officer Candidate School was amalgamated with the Swedish Armoured Troops School into a new school, the Swedish Armoured Troops Combat School (Pansartruppernas stridsskola, PS) which was established on 1 June 1981.

== Operations ==
The school was directly subordinate to the Inspector of the Swedish Armoured Troops, but was in a barracks point of view subordinate to the executive officer (sekundchef) of the Göta Life Guards. The school was tasked with training officer candidates from all units within the Swedish Armoured Troops. These underwent two-stage training, first candidate school and second candidate school, then complete their training at the Royal Military Academy. The school was provided with loans of different types of combat vehicles from the armoured units, which was characterized by the fact that Stridsvagn 103 was presence at the school, but not at the Göta Life Guards.

== Barracks and training areas ==
When the school was established as the Swedish Armoured Troops Officer Candidate School (Pansartruppernas officersaspirantskola, POAS), it was placed to Strängnäs Garrison on 29 September 1942, where it was co-located with the Södermanland Regiment (P 10). On 3 April 1946, the school was moved to Enköping Garrison, where it was co-located with Göta Life Guards (P 1). The school was placed in the barracks of the Life company before it was moved into a newly built school building within the barracks area on 1 March 1967. On 1 June 1980, the school was transferred to Skövde Garrison.

== Commanding officers ==
- 1942–1961: ?
- 1961–1965: Kurt Magnusson
- 1965–1968: Erik Grönberg
- 1968–1969: Stig Barke
- 1969–1972: Nils Gunnar Ahlgren
- 1972–1974: Rune Wrangdahl
- 1974–1979: Birger Ericsson
- 1979–1980: Ingemar Björnsson

== Names, designations and locations ==
Names	Translation	From		To
Pansartruppernas officersaspirantskola	Swedish Armoured Troops Officer Candidate School	1942-09-28	–	1945-09-27
Pansartruppernas kadettskola	Swedish Armoured Troops Cadet School	1945-09-28	–	1961-03-31
Pansartruppernas kadett- och aspirantskola	Swedish Armoured Troops Cadet and Officer Candidate School	1961-04-01	–	1981-05-31
Designations		From		To
POAS		1942-09-28	–	1945-09-27
PKS		1945-09-28	–	1961-03-31
PKAS		1961-04-01	–	1981-05-31
Locations		From		To
Strängnäs Garrison		1942-09-28	–	1946-04-02
Enköping Garrison		1946-04-03	–	1980-05-31
Skövde garrison		1980-06-01	–	1981-05-31

== See also ==
- Swedish Armoured Troops School
