= Västgöta Regiment =

Royal Västgöta Regiment
- Kungliga Västgöta regemente
- Active: 1628–1713, 1713–1927
- Country: Sweden
- Branch: Swedish Army
- Type: Infantry
- Part of: 3rd Military District (1833–1893); 3rd Army Division (1893–1927)
- Garrison/HQ: Vänersborg
- Motto: Arvet förpliktigar (Note: The motto was in 1981 adopted by the Skaraborg Regiment (P 4) by the then regimental commander, colonel Norderup, in connection with the regiment's 350th anniversary.) ("The heritage obligates")
- Colors: Yellow and black
- March: "Vaktombytet" (V. Holtz) (Note: The march was adopted in 1894. Since 1999, the march is used as a traditional march by the Land Warfare Centre.)
- Battle honours: Skara (1611), Skillingehed (1612), Burgstall (1631), Breitenfeld (1631), Dirschau (1627), Stuhm (1629), Lützen (1632), Lund (1676)

The Royal Västgöta Regiment (Swedish: Västgöta regemente), also I 6, was a Swedish Army infantry regiment that traced its origins back to the 16th century. It was converted from a cavalry regiment in 1811 and disbanded in 1927. The regiment's soldiers were recruited from the province of Västergötland, and it was later garrisoned there.

== History ==
The regiment was converted from the cavalry regiment Royal Västergötland Dragoon Regiment in 1811 and was given the name Västgöta Regiment. The regiment was given the designation I 6 (6th Infantry Regiment) in a general order in 1816. It was garrisoned in Vänersborg from 1916, and disbanded in 1927.

== Campaigns ==
- None

== Organisation ==
1833

- Life company
- Laske company
- Älvsborgs company
- Barne company
- Kåkinds company
- Vadsbo company
- Gudhems company
- Vartofta company

== Commanding officers ==
Regimental commanders from 1679 to 1927.

- 1679–1708: G Zelow
- 1708–1710: K Hierta
- 1710–1714: Carl Gustaf Dücker
- 1714–1719: Hans von Fersen
- 1719–1721: C Frölich
- 1721–1731: C G Kruse
- 1731–1737: A Spens
- 1737–1740: D J von Löwenstern
- 1740–1747: J F Didron
- 1747–1749: J F von Kaulbars
- 1749–1768: Axel Wrede-Sparre
- 1768–1775: L Hierta
- 1775–1785: Carl Julius Bernhard von Bohlen
- 1785–1808: G W Fock
- 1808–1811: M Palmstierna
- 1811–1824: G M Adlercreutz
- 1824–1842: U C C A von Platen
- 1842–1858: B Von Hall
- 1858–1868: E G Lilliehöök
- 1868–1872: E H Hagberg
- 1872–1887: M W Hamilton
- 1887–1896: C W Ericson
- 1896–1904: Axel von Matern
- 1904–1912: Erik Bergström
- 1912–1913: Anders Erik Werner
- 1913–1922: Hugo Leonard Leth
- 1922–1927: Ernst Nils David af Sandeberg

== Names, designations and locations ==
Name	Translation	From		To
Kungl. Västgöta regemente till häst	Royal Västgöta Regiment of Horse	1628-??-??	–	1634-??-??
Kungl. Västgöta och Dals ryttare	Royal Västgöta and Dal Horsemen	1634-??-??	–	1655-??-??
Kungl. Västgöta kavalleriregemente	Royal Västgöta Cavalry Regiment	1655-??-??	–	1713-05-06
Kungl. Västgöta kavalleriregemente	Royal Västgöta Cavalry Regiment	1713-??-??	–	1802-??-??
Kungl. Västgöta linjedragonregemente	Royal Västgöta Line Dragoon Regiment	1802-??-??	–	1806-??-??
Kungl. Västgöta dragonregemente	Royal Västgöta Dragoon Regiment	1806-??-??	–	1811-??-??
Kungl. Västgöta regemente	Royal Västgöta Regiment	1811-??-??	–	1927-12-27
Avvecklingsorganisation	Decommissioning Organization	1928-01-01	–	1928-03-31
Designation		From		To
No. 6		1816-10-01	–	1914-09-30
I 6		1914-10-01	–	1927-12-27
Location		From		To
Eggby meadows		1689	–	1745-08-25
Axevalla heath		1745-08-26	–	1916-12-14
Vänersborg		1916-12-15	–	1928-03-31

== See also ==
- List of Swedish infantry regiments
