= Alf Sandqvist =

Swedish Army officer

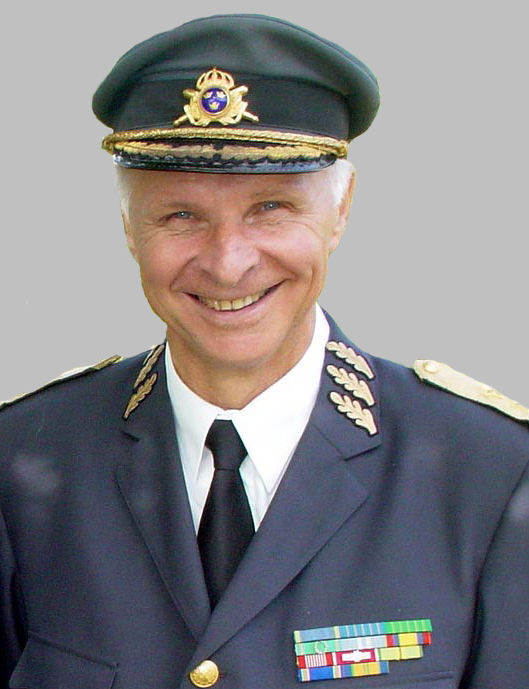
- Sandqvist in 2008.
- Born: Alf Robert Sandqvist; 27 May 1945 (age 81); Othem, Sweden
- Military career
- Allegiance: Sweden
- Branch: Swedish Army
- Service years: 1969–2005
- Rank: Major General
- Commands: Skaraborg Regiment; Inspector of the Armoured Troops; Swedish Army Armoured Center; Swedish Army Brigade Center; Chief of Home Guard; Inspector of the Army

Major General Alf Robert Sandqvist (born 27 May 1945) is a retired Swedish Army officer. Sandqvist's senior commands include the Chief of Home Guard and Inspector [General] of the Swedish Army.

== Early life ==
Sandqvist was born on 27 May 1945 in Othem, Gotland, Sweden, the son of John Robert Sandqvist (1919–2004) and his wife Alfhilda Gustava (1922–2010). He passed studentexamen in 1966 and considered becoming a gymnastics director.

== Career ==
Sandqvist attended officer candidate school (aspirantskola) in 1967 and then the Royal Military Academy in Stockholm from 1968 to 1969 when he was commissioned as fänrik and was assigned to Södermanland Regiment (P 10) in Strängnäs. He continued servering in Södermanland Regiment being promoted to lieutenant in 1971 and to captain in 1972. Sandqvist attended the Army General Course (AAK) at the Swedish Armed Forces Staff College from 1974 to 1975 and then Higher Course (HK) at the Swedish Armed Forces Staff College from 1977 to 1979. He was promoted to major in Södermanland Regiment in 1980 and served as company commander there from 1984 to 1985. Sandqvist served as commander of the Maintenance Section (Underhållssektionen) at the Eastern Military District from 1985 to 1988 and he was promoted to lieutenant colonel in 1986. He was commanding officer of the EU battalion in 1988 and the basic training battalion (grundutbildningsbataljon) at Södermanland Regiment from 1988 to 1989. Sandqvist was then acting deputy commander of Skaraborg Regiment (P 4) when he was promoted to colonel on 1 April 1990.

In November 1992 he was promoted to senior colonel and appointed commander of Skaraborg Regiment as well as Defence District Commander. Sandqvist was then Inspector of the Swedish Armoured Troops at the Swedish Army Armoured Center from 1 October 1993 to 30 June 1995 and Brigade Inspector at the Swedish Army Brigade Warfare Centre (Arméns brigadcentrum) from 1995 to 1997, both in Skövde. Sandqvist served as the Chief of Home Guard from 1 October 1997 until 30 June 2000 and on 1 July 2000, he assumed the position of General Inspector of the Army and commanding officer of the Army Tactical Command. On 28 November 2002, the Swedish government appointed Sandqvist to the position of Inspector of the Army in the General Training and Management Directorate (Grundorganisationsledningen) in the Swedish Armed Forces Headquarters from 1 January 2003 until 31 May 2005. Sandqvist retired from the military in 2005 and then became head of the National Association of Volunteer Motor Transport Corps for 10 years until 2015. On 3 December 2016, Sandqvist became chairman of the association Ryttmästarbostället outside Skövde.

== Personal life ==
Sandqvist is married to Yvonne Marianne (born 1948) and together they have two children: Pernilla Helen (born 1970) and Per Robert Åke (born 1973).

== Dates of rank ==
- 1969 – Second lieutenant
- 1971 – Lieutenant
- 1972 – Captain
- 1980 – Major
- 1987 – Lieutenant colonel
- 1 April 1990 – Colonel
- November 1992 – Senior colonel
- 1997 – Major general

== Awards and decorations ==
=== Swedish ===
- (Sweden) For Zealous and Devoted Service of the Realm
- (Sweden) Home Guard Medal of Merit
- (Sweden) Association of Home Guard Officers Merit Badge
- (Sweden) Swedish Armed Forces Conscript Medal
- (Sweden) Swedish Women's Voluntary Defence Organization Medal of Merit in gold
- (Sweden) Swedish Volunteer Air Corps Medal of Merit (Frivilliga flygkårens förtjänstmedalj)
- (Sweden) Swedish Association of Women’s Auxiliary Driver Corps Royal Medal in Gold (Svenska Kvinnliga Bilkårers kungliga medalj i guld)

=== Foreign ===
- (United States) Commander of the Legion of Merit
- (Denmark) Home Guard Badge of Merit (Hjemmevaernets fortjensttegn)

== Honours ==
- Member of the Royal Swedish Academy of War Sciences (2000)

Military offices
Preceded by Stig Edgren	Inspector of the Swedish Armoured Troops Swedish Army Armoured Center; 1993–1995	Succeeded by None
Preceded by None	Brigade Inspector Swedish Army Brigade Center; 1995–1997	Succeeded by None
Preceded by Jan-Olof Borgén	Chief of Home Guard; 1997–2000	Succeeded by Mats Welff
Preceded by Paul Degerlund	Inspector [General] of the Army; 2000–2005	Succeeded by Sverker Göranson
