= Land Warfare Centre (Sweden) =

- Markstridsskolan
- Active: 1999–present
- Country: Sweden
- Allegiance: Swedish Armed Forces
- Branch: Swedish Army
- Type: Ground warfare
- Role: School
- Garrison/HQ: Skövde garrison
- Mottos: Posse Est Velle ("Ability based on knowledge and will")
- Colors: Yellow, white and black
- March: "Pansarkamrater" (Green) (Note: The march was adopted in 1999 and established on 22 March 1999. It was previously used by the Swedish Armoured Troops School from 1966 to 1992 and by the Swedish Army Armoured Center from 1992 to 1995 as well as the Combat School South (Stridsskola Syd, SSS) from 1995 to 1998.)

Commanders
- Current commander: COL Lennart Widerström

The Land Warfare Centre (Swedish: Markstridsskolan, MSS) is a joint school unit in the Swedish Army. Established in 1999, it is located in Skövde garrison in Skövde. The Land Warfare Centre develops, educates and trains individuals and units and systems within the function of ground warfare.

== History ==
Through a school investigation, the En samordnad militär skolorganisation ("A coordinated military school organization") (SOU 1997:112), which investigated a new military school system, which was carried out by the Swedish government's investigating officer in collaboration with the Swedish Armed Forces and the Swedish Defence College, suggested that Combat School North (Stridsskola Nord, SSN) in Umeå, Combat School Middle (Stridsskola Mitt, SSM) in Kvarn and Combat School South (Stridsskola Syd, SSS) in Skövde would be disbanded as separate schools, and instead be incorporated into a new school. The new school, the Land Warfare Centre (Markstridsskolan, MSS), was suggested to be located in Skövde, and to be made up of a school staff in Skövde and three school parts in Boden, Kvarn and Skövde. The government shared the proposal of the investigation, and thus proposed in its bill 1997/98:1, that the three combat schools should be disbanded and instead be incorporated into the Land Warfare Centre. The combat schools were disbanded on 31 December 1998, and in its place, the Land Warfare Centre was formed on 1 January 1999.

== Operations ==
The three main areas of the Land Warfare Centre are education, development and training. The Land Warfare Centre educates the future commanders of the Swedish Armed Forces with the help of advanced training facilities, teachers and knowledge. It also educates and develops the Swedish Armed Forces' officers in the various areas of ground warfare. It also works with training of the Swedish Army's various units using advanced simulator technology, as well as developing methods, regulations, personal equipment and weapon systems used in the Swedish Armed Forces. The Land Warfare Centre conducts training at several different levels within the army, including the basic specialist officer training, as well as level and competence-enhancing training for tactical officers. In addition, the school conducts vocational and training courses.

== Barracks and training areas ==
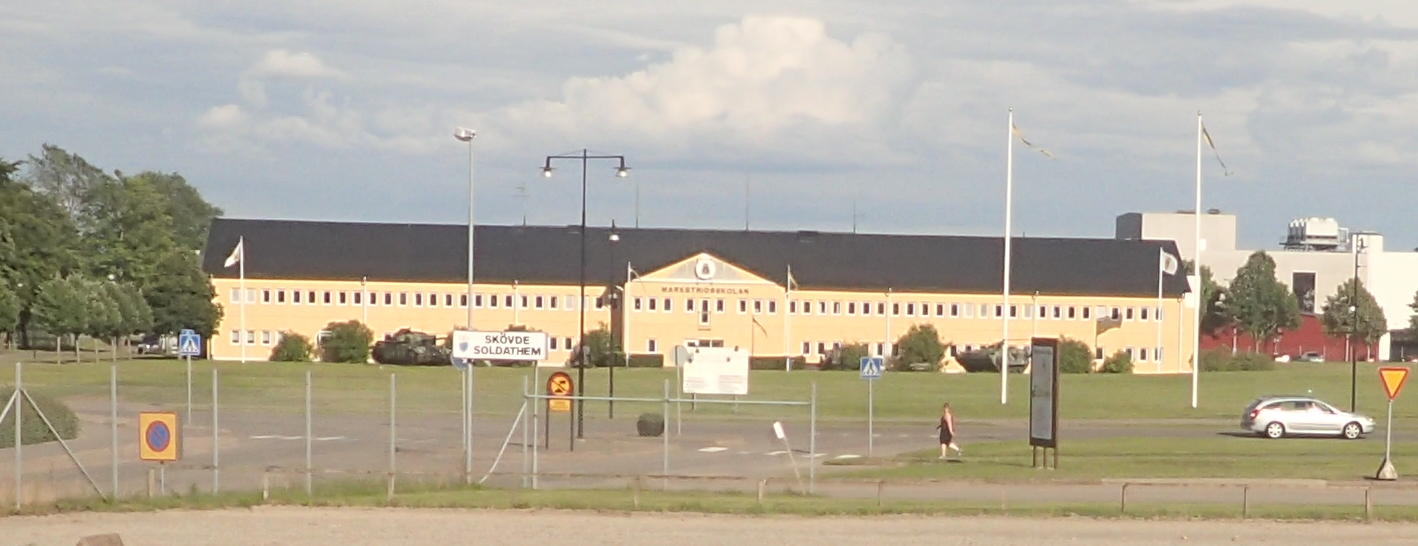
The Land Warfare Centre in Skövde.

In Skövde, the school is co-located with other units within Skövde Garrison. In Kvarn, the school is located at the camp that was erected in the early 1960s for the then Swedish Infantry Combat School (InfSS), and which was fully completed in 1966. The camp in Kvarn is located at Prästtomta proving ground where the Swedish Armed Forces also erected Sweden's largest facility for urban warfare. This facility comprises a total of 42 buildings.

== Heraldry and traditions ==
=== Colours, standards and guidons ===
The colours of the Land Warfare Centre are three double swallow-tailed Swedish flags. The colours were presented to the former Army Southern Combat School (SSS), Army Central Combat School (SSM) and Army Northern Combat School (SSN) in 1996.

In 2011, colonel Michael Claesson began work on developing a colour for the Land Warfare Centre. One suggestion that was raised from the Land Warfare Centre was that it wanted a colour where the dominant color was black, with the background that the black color is dominant in the coat of arms. The Board of Military Traditions (Försvarets traditionsnämnd) rejected the proposal, citing the fact that the black color is traditionally associated with the Swedish Engineer Troops and where the Göta Engineer Regiment carries a black colour. Black colour is, however, otherwise rare in the Swedish Armed Forces – and have not been carried in Sweden since the Thirty Years' War in the 17th century. Furthermore, the Board of Military Traditions considered that black colours can be associated with the fascist movements of the 1930s. On 10 February 2015, the colour was ready for the traditional nailing of the cloth to the staff, where the unit's coat of arms rested on a black and yellow cloth. At the ceremony, three former commanding officers of the Land Warfare Centre were present, brigadier general Klas Eksell, brigadier general Micael Claesson and colonel Ingemar Gustafsson, and the then commanding officer, colonel Gustaf Fahl, together with deputy commanding officer lieutenant colonel Sven Antonsson. The nailing was carried out at the Swedish Army Museum where the colour was attached to the staff. On 19 September 2015, the colour was presented to the Land Warfare Centre by His Majesty the King Carl XVI Gustaf during a ceremony in Skövde. The colour is based on the colors, yellow, white and black which symbolizes the school's history and origin from the infantry, cavalry and the Swedish Armoured Troops.

=== Coat of arms ===
The coat of the arms of the Land Warfare Centre used from 1999. Blazon: "Sable, a spear issuant argent surmounted by an old arm bracelet or. The shield surrounded by an open wreath of laurel or".

=== Marches ===
When the school was established, "Pansarkamrater" (Green) was adopted as unit march, which was established on 22 March 1999 by the Swedish Armed Forces Headquarters. The march was a legacy from the Combat School South, but was originally dedicated to the Swedish Armoured Troops School. While the school's unit march was established, the school also adopted the three traditional marches. The first, "Vaktombyte" (V. Holtz), which is a legacy from Västgöta Regiment, where the school's training battalion in Skövde, Wästgöta Battalion, was the heir to the regiment. The second, the "Coburger marsch" (unknown), a legacy from Combat School North, and the third, the "Gå på marsch" (Sernklef), a legacy from the Combat School Middle.

=== Medals ===
In 2002, the Markstridsskolans (MSS) förtjänstmedalj ("Land Warfare Centre (MSS) Medal of Merit") in silver (MSSftjSM) of the 8th size was established. The medal ribbon is of black moiré with yellow edges and a white stripe on the middle.

Medal ribbon

== Commanding officers ==
- 1999-01-01–2000-06-30: Senior Colonel Jan Bergström
- 2000-07-01–2003-04-15: Colonel Björn Tomtlund
- 2003-04-16–2006-06-30: Colonel Ingemar Gustafsson
- 2006-07-01–2007-05-13: Colonel Göran Mårtensson
- 2007-05-14–2007-07-31: Lieutenant Colonel Michael Nilsson (acting)
- 2007-08-01–2010-12-31: Colonel Klas Eksell
- 2011-01-01–2012-05-13: Colonel Michael Claesson (break for international service)
- 2012-05-14–2012-08-31: Lieutenant Colonel Sven Antonsson (acting)
- 2012-09-01–2013-03-31: Colonel Ronald Månsson (acting)
- 2013-04-01–2013-08-15: Lieutenant Colonel Sven Antonsson (acting)
- 2013-08-16–2015-05-10: Colonel Gustaf Fahl
- 2015-05-11–2015-08-13: Lieutenant Colonel Sven Antonsson (acting)
- 2015-08-14–2017-08-31: Colonel Michael Nilsson
- 2017-09-01–2020-05-31: Colonel Stefan Smedman
- 2020-06-01–2024-06-12: Brigadier General Rickard Johansson
- 2024-06-13–2025-01-22: Lieutenant Colonel Johan Skiöld (acting)
- 2025-01-22–present: Colonel Lennart Widerström

== Names, designations and locations ==
Name	Translation	From		To
Markstridsskolan	Land Warfare Centre; Ground Combat School; Land Combat School; Army Combat School	1999-01-01	–	
Designation		From		To
MSS		1999-01-01	–	
Location		From		To
Skövde Garrison		1999-01-01	–	

== See also ==
- Swedish Army Armoured Center
