= Skövde Garrison =

Swedish army garrison

- Skövde, Västra Götaland
- Coat of arms of major Skövde Garrison units

Site information
- Type: Army garrison
- Owner: Swedish Fortifications Agency
- Operator: Swedish Armed Forces

Location
- Coordinates: 58°22′46″N 13°50′41″E

Site history
- In use: 1905–present

Garrison information
- Garrison: 1st Division; Skaraborg Brigade; Skaraborg Regiment; Göta Logistic Regiment; Land Warfare Centre; Western Military Region

Skövde Garrison (Note: Swedish: Skövde garnison, "Skövde Garrison") is a Swedish Army garrison located in the county of Västra Götaland, active since 1905. It is among the absolute oldest and largest Swedish garrisons.

== History ==
=== Foundation ===
In the Army Order of 1901, a decision was made to relocate all field regiments, previously housed in tents and huts, into more permanent barrack establishments. In 1902, after no suitable existing location was found, the Army was tasked with creating an agreement with the city of Skövde to grant land for new barracks to house the Life Regiment Hussars and the First Göta Service Corps.

By 1905, the barracks stood complete, as the First Göta Service Corps moved its headquarters there in the autumn of that year, followed by the Life Regiment Hussars in the winter. That same year, Prince Carl, Duke of Västergötland, visited the site to inspect the newly completed barracks.

By 1908, the garrison had expanded further, and a military hospital was built on the premises, where both military and civilian patients were admitted up until its disbandment in 1955.

=== Present ===
The garrison's presence in the city has occasionally been a source of concern. Civilian infrastructure in the city has occasionally been relocated from the vicinity of the garrison due to concerns that, as a legitimate military target, the garrison could endanger civilians in the event of war, and employees in drop-off laundromats have occasionally found forgotten ammunition in soldiers’ laundry, which could pose threats to the employees when handling.

In line with Sweden’s commitment to sustainable energy, the first solar park designed to supply green energy to a military facility was established in Skövde in 2019 as an experimental project, particularly to test its resilience against potential radio jamming attempts by adversaries.

Over 2,000 people worked at the garrison in 2022, and each year about 300 conscripts complete their service at Skövde Garrison, which has a capacity of 350 per year. Additionally, the Swedish Armed Forces Logistics and Motor School trains around 1,800 students annually.

== Units ==
- 1905–1984: Life Regiment Hussars
- 1905–present: Göta Logistic Regiment
- 1914–present: Skaraborg Regiment
- 1937–1942: 3rd Army Division
- 1941–1997: Western Army Division
- 1942–1993: Western Military District
- 1943–2000: Skaraborg Brigade
- 1944–1961: Göta Signal Corps
- 1944–1981: Armoured Troops School
- 1991–1995: Army Armoured Centre
- 1991–present: Land Warfare Centre
- 2000–2004: 1st Mechanized Division
- 2010–2021: 2nd Brigade
- 2013–present: Western Military Region
- 2022–present: 1st Division
- 2022–present: Skaraborg Brigade

== Sources ==
- "Kungl. Maj:ts proposition 1902:1". riksdagen.se (in Swedish). Riksdag. 1902.
- Bäckström, Johan (1952). "Kavalleriinspektören prins Carl inspekterar första gången de nya kasernerna hos Livregementets husarer K 3, i Skövde 1905". digitaltmuseum.org (in Swedish).
- "Garnisonssjukhuset i Skövde (1908 – 1955)". sok.riksarkivet.se (in Swedish). National Archives of Sweden. 1956.
- Ljungné, Sture, ed. (1991). Göta trängregemente: 100 år 1891-1991 [Göta Logistic Regiment: 100 years 1891-1991] (in Swedish). Skövde: Göta trängregemente. ISBN 9163004968. SELIBR 7448561.
- "Livregementets husarer". sok.riksarkivet.se (in Swedish). National Archives of Sweden. 2000.
- Stäpel, Marthina (2013-05-09). "Nya tvättrutiner ska stoppa militärernas slarv" [New laundry routines to stop military negligence] (in Swedish). Sveriges Television.
- "Göta Trängregemente". garnisonsmuseet.se (in Swedish). Garnisonsmuseet. 2016.
- Claesson, Kristina (2019-01-22). "Solcellsparken ska ge grön el till militären i Skövde" [The solar park will provide green electricity to the military in Skövde]. Skövde Nyheter (in Swedish).
- "Värnpliktskonsulent Skövde garnison". vakanser.se (in Swedish). Swedish Armed Forces. 2022-01-20.
- Franzén, Tobias Larsson (2023-12-27). "Historisk byggnation på T 2 i Skövde: "Första på 100 år"" [Historic construction at T 2 in Skövde: “First in 100 years”]. Skaraborgs Allehanda (in Swedish).
- Carlqvist, Bosse (2024-03-23). "Förskolor i Skövde behöver flyttas – ligger för nära krigsmål" [Preschools in Skövde need to be moved – located too close to war targets] (in Swedish). Sveriges Television.
