= Swedish Civil Defence Board =

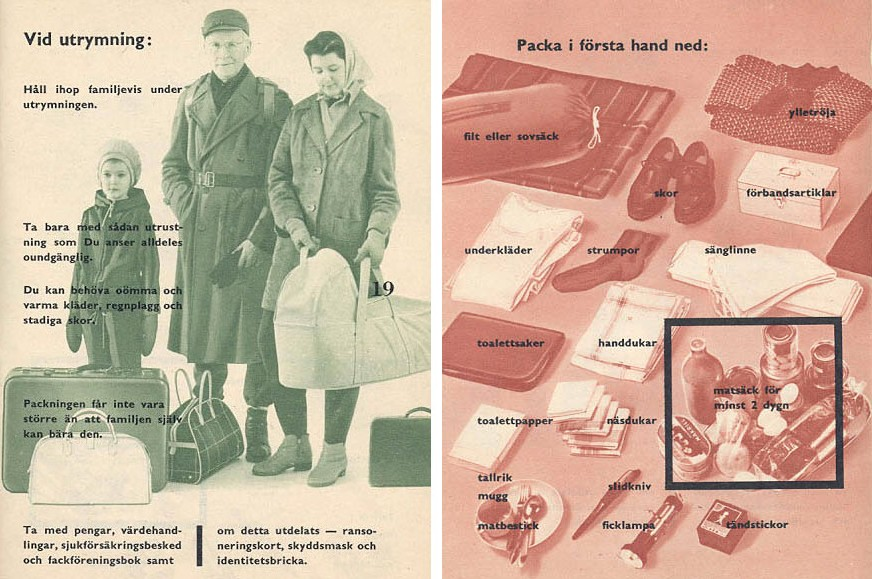
Two pages out of the 1961 edition of If the war comes published by the Swedish Civil Defence Board.

Heraldic arms of the Swedish Civil Defence Board.

Swedish Civil Defence Board (Swedish: Civilförsvarsstyrelsen, Cfs) was a central government agency between 1944 and 1986 which exercised the central management of the civil defense in Sweden.

== History ==
The Swedish Civil Defence Board was established on 1 October 1944 (SFS 1944:636) and had the task of exercising the central management of the civil defense in Sweden and also handle certain matters concerning the so-called Peace Fire Services (Fredsbrandsväsendet) (SFS 1948:735). The agency replaced the Air Protection Inspectorate (Luftskyddsinspektionen) and the Evacuation Commission (Utrymmningskommissionen) (SFS 1944:636).

According to its instructions in 1948, 1965 and 1978 (SFS 1948:735, 1965:676, 1978:112) the Civil Defense Board exercised the central management of Sweden's civil defense, followed the development and research in the field of civil defense, planned the civil defense actions common to the whole country, led and supervised the rest of the planning of the civil defense and conducted civil defense training and had oversight of the construction of air-raid shelters.

Civil defence training was conducted at the civil defense schools in Rosersberg, Katrineholm, Revinge, Sandö, Brännebrona (Skövde) and for a shorter time in Tylösand and Djursätra. In 1977 the civil defense schools were reorganized into central education and depot facilities. Facility East in Rosersberg, Facility Central in Katrineholm, Facility North in Sandö, Facility South in Revinge and from 1980 Facility West in Skövde.

From 1944 to 1968, the Swedish Civil Defence Board sorted under the Ministry of the Interior and then the Ministry of Defence. On 1 July 1986 the Swedish Civil Defence Board and the National Fire Service Board (Statens brandnämnd) were merge into the newly established Rescue Services Agency (SFS 1986:424).

== Directors General ==
- 1944–1948: Åke Natt och Dag
- 1948–1975: Åke Sundelin
- 1975–1986: Gunnar Gustafsson
