= Rosersberg Palace =

Coordinates: 59°34′27″N 17°50′40″E

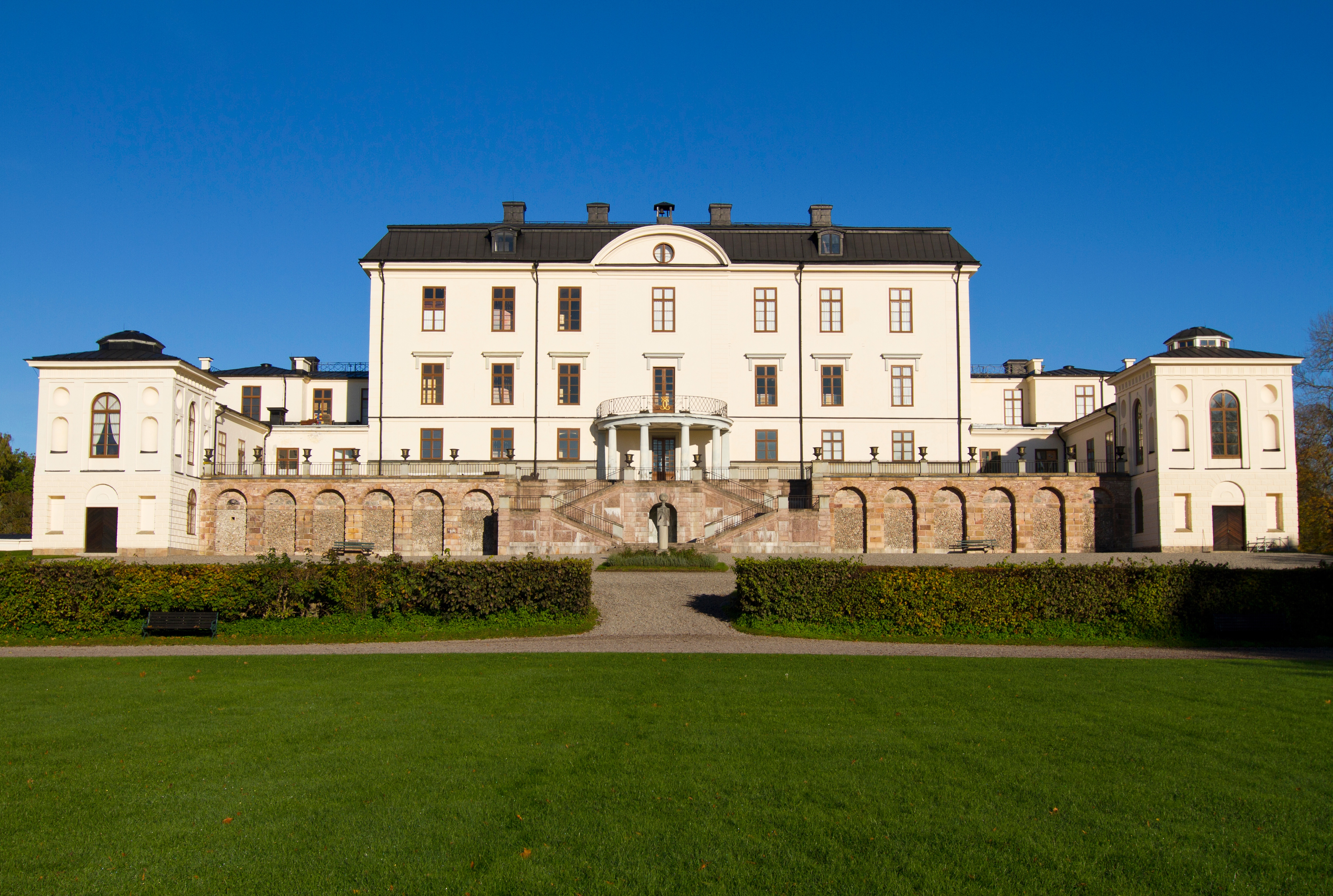
- The palace from south
- Interactive map of the Rosersberg Palace area

General information
- Location: Rosersberg, Sweden
- Construction started: 1634
- Completed: 1638; 388 years ago
- Owner: National Property Board

Rosersberg Palace (Swedish: Rosersbergs slott) is one of the royal palaces of Sweden. Situated on the shores of Lake Mälaren, on the outskirts of Stockholm, it was built in the 1630s by the Oxenstierna family and became a royal palace in 1762, when the state gave it to Duke Charles (later Charles XIII), the younger brother of Gustav III.

== History ==
Gabriel Bengtsson Oxenstierna named the palace after his mother, who came from the prestigious Tre Rosor ("Three Roses") family. Construction of the building in the typical Renaissance style of the time started in 1634 and was completed in 1638.

In the late 17th century, the Renaissance style was out of fashion and Oxenstierna's son, Bengt Oxenstierna, had it radically modernised in the then current Baroque style under the architect Nicodemus Tessin the Younger. The gables of the main building were demolished and the building was given a new roof. New wings and a colonnaded gallery were added.

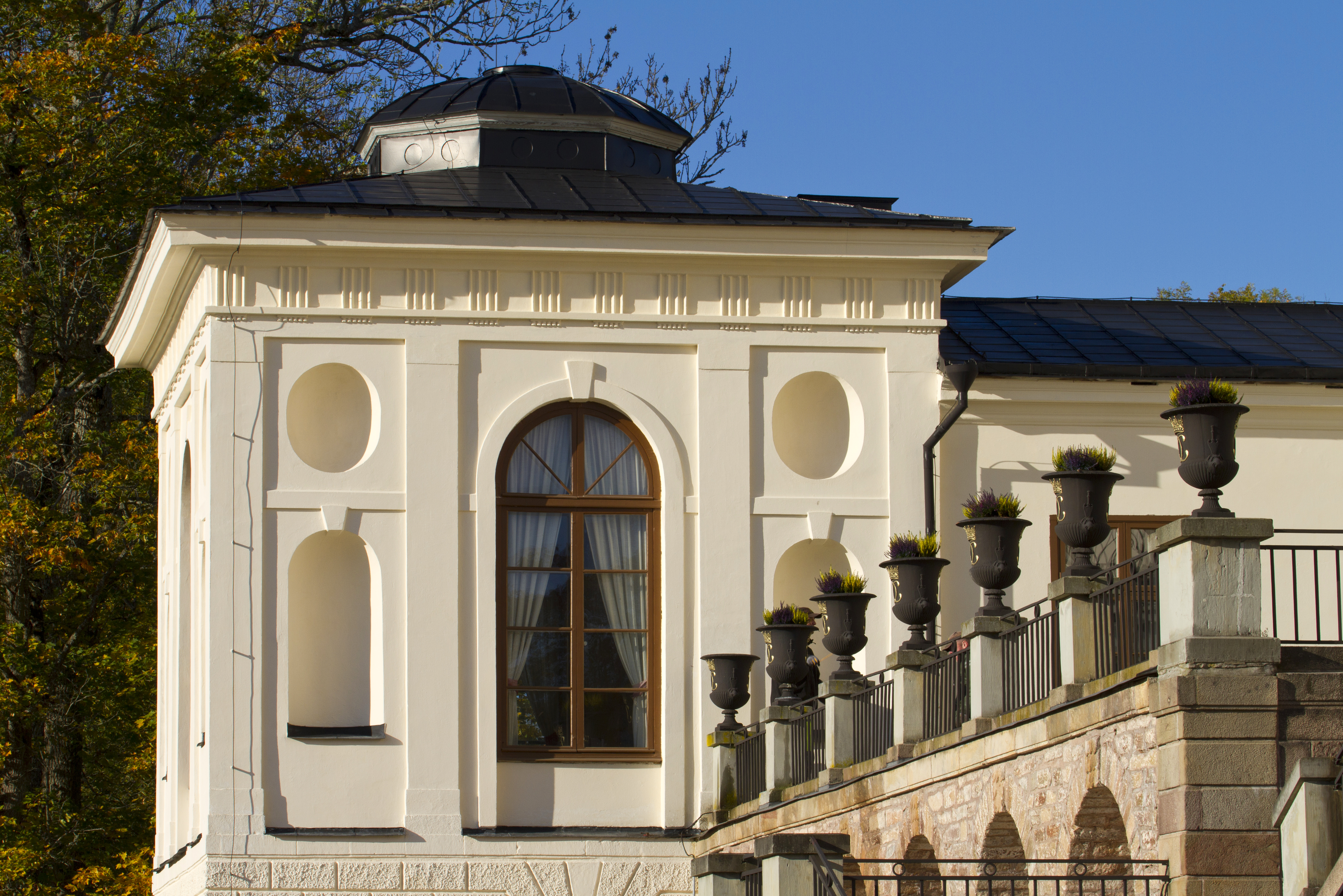
Part of the west wing of the Palace with flower pots

In 1747, Rosersberg was acquired by Baron Erland Carlsson Broman, and was again modernized with the assistance of the architect Jean Eric Rehn. Broman died in 1757, and the palace was acquired by the state, and given to Duke Charles.

Charles took up residence in the palace and continued with Rehn's plans for modernizing it. It was renovated in the late Gustavian style but was lacking many of the more capricious aspects of the style, replacing them with a more serious and romantic tone which is referred to as the Charles XIII Empire style. As part of the modernisation a series of new interiors were created, the most notable of which are the Orange and Red drawing rooms, and the Hogland Room.

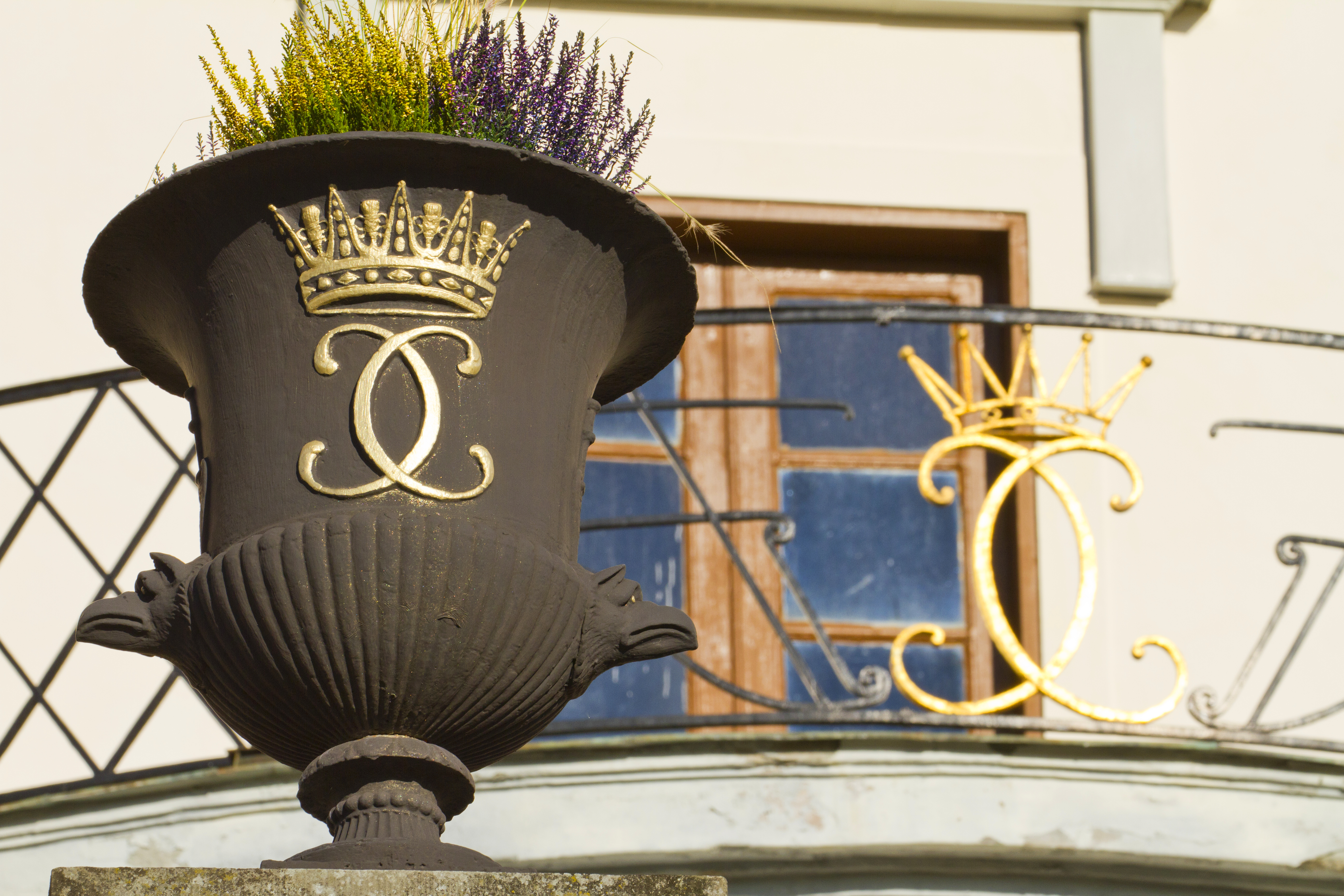
Flower pot and balcony with royal emblems

It was a favourite among the palaces for Charles XIV John and Queen Desideria, the first of the Bernadotte line, who spent their summers relaxing at Rosersberg and were the last royals to use the palace as a residence. Charles John's bedchamber is regarded as one of the most important examples of an early 19th-century Swedish interior. Nowadays, the rooms and collections are preserved very much as they were during the period 1795–1825.

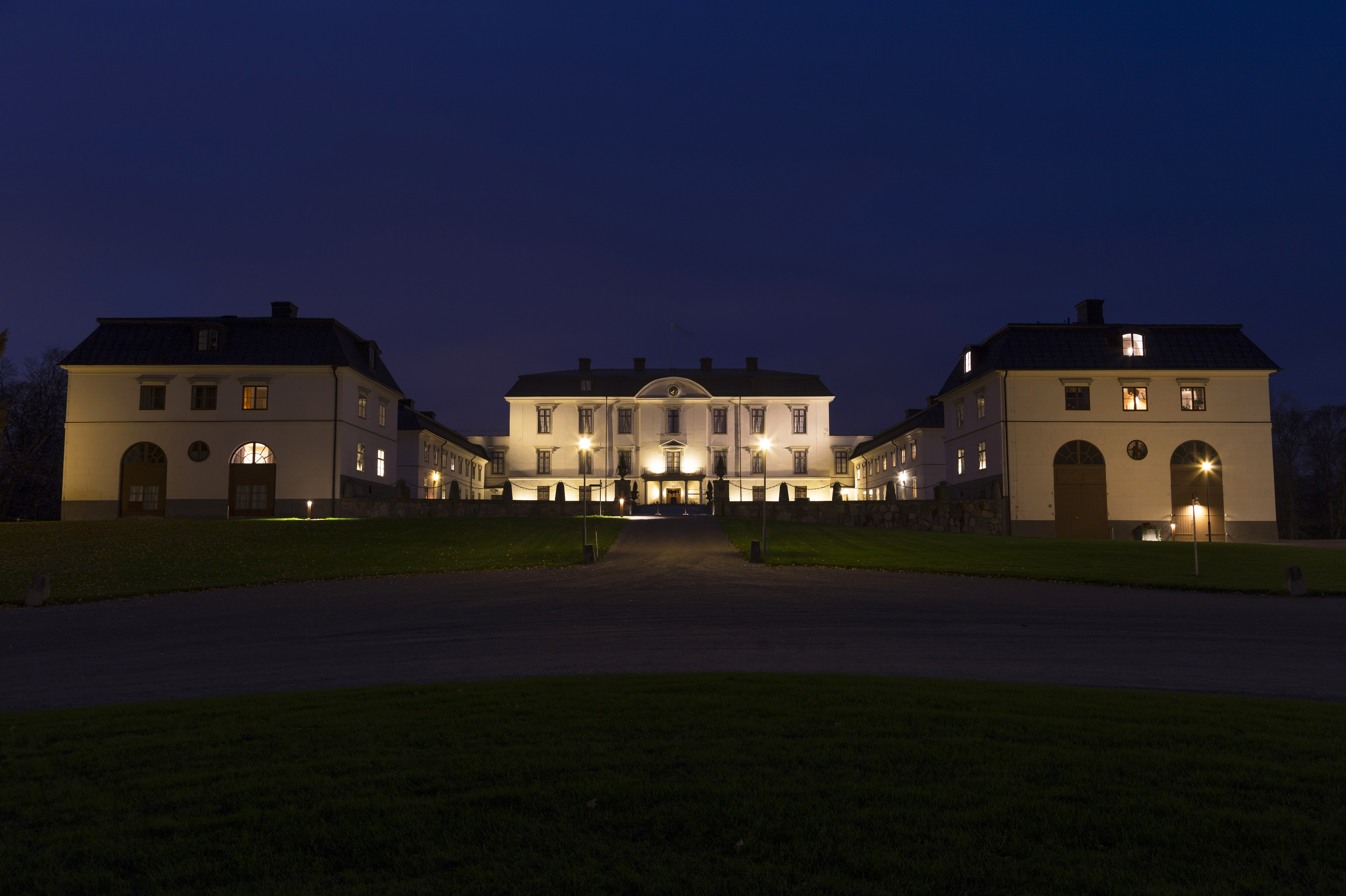
The palace from north west at night

After the death of Desideria in 1860, the palace was given to Swedish infantry. In 1874 the Swedish Infantry Gunnery School moved into the castle's ground floor and wings. In the spring of 1961, the Infantry Gunnery School was relocated to Linköping Garrison. On 1 July 1961 the castle was handed over to the Swedish Civil Defence Board. In 1986, the Civil Defence Board was reorganized into the Rescue Services Agency, which until 2006 had premises in the castle and castle wings. In the summer of 2008, Rosersberg Hotel and Conference opened a café and bed and breakfast.

== Park ==
The palace has a park which incorporates a French Baroque garden commissioned by Bengt Oxenstierna, and designed and planted at the end of the 17th century by Tessin the Younger. At the time it was considered one of the most lavish gardens in Sweden, but much of the garden has become overgrown or been lost. The avenues and a 600-metre (1,968 ft) pond still exist. On the left hand side of the palace is an English garden with winding paths commissioned by Duke Charles around 1800.

== See also ==
- Architecture of Stockholm
