= Skaraborg Regiment (armoured) =

Coordinates: 58°22′46″N 13°50′43″E

- Skaraborgs regemente
- Active: 1942–1997; 2000–present
- Country: Sweden
- Branch: Swedish Army
- Type: Armoured
- Part of: Armed Forces Headquarters (Note: III Military District (1942–1966), Western Military District (1966–1993), Southern Military District (1993–1997), Joint Forces Command (2000–2005), and the Swedish Armed Forces Headquarters (2005–present).)
- Garrison/HQ: Skövde Garrison
- Mottos: Arvet förpliktar ("The heritage obligates")
- Colours: Black and yellow
- March: "Geschwindmarsch" (Herrman)
- Battle honours: Varberg (1565), Narva (1581), Lützen (1632), Leipzig (1642), Warsaw (1656), Lund (1676), Landskrona (1677), Malatitze (1708)

Commanders
- Commander: COL Peter Andersson

Insignia
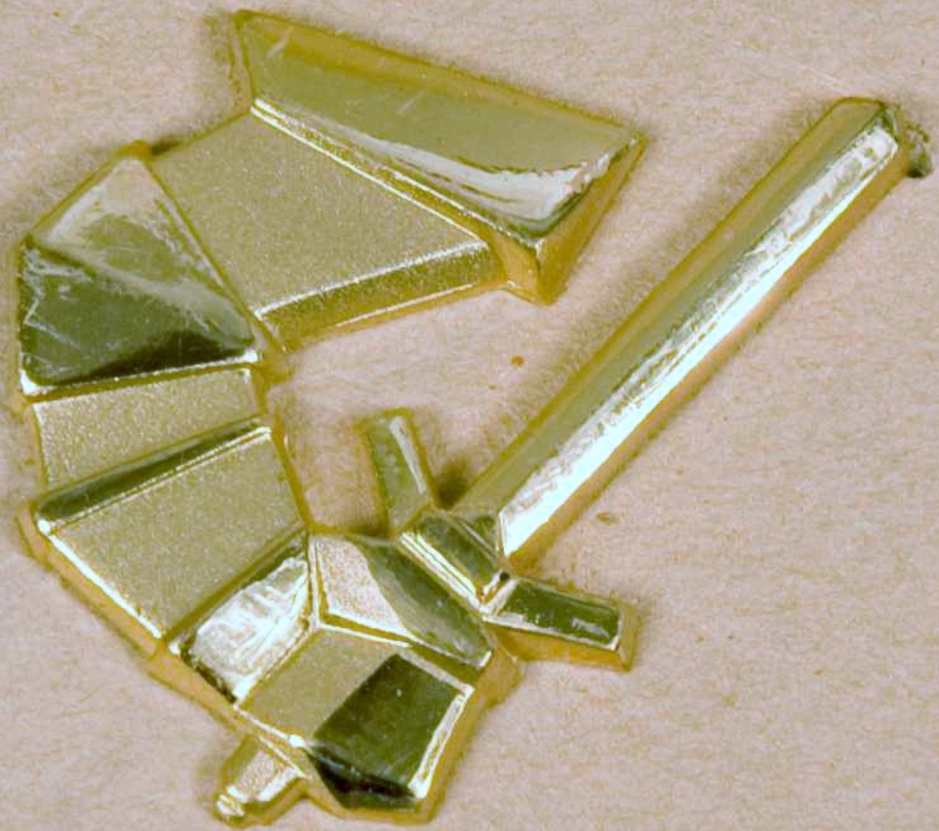
- Branch insignia

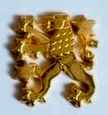
- Unit insignia

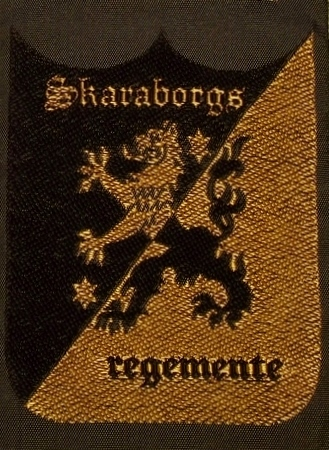
- Shoulder sleeve insignia

The Skaraborg Regiment (Swedish: Skaraborgs regemente), designation P 4, is a Swedish Army armoured regiment that traces its origins back to the 16th century. It was converted from an infantry regiment in 1942. The regiment's soldiers were originally recruited from Skaraborg County, and it is currently garrisoned in Skövde, in the former Skaraborg County.

== History ==
The regiment was converted from an infantry regiment to an armored regiment in 1942 and was given the name Skaraborg Armoured Regiment. The regiment was given the designation P 4 (4th Armoured Regiment) and was garrisoned in Skövde. On 1 April 1963, it regained its old name of the Royal Skaraborg Regiment. In 1974, the regiment gained the new designation P 4/Fo 35 as a consequence of a merge with the local defence district Fo 35.

For a short time in the 1990s, the unit was then merged with the wartime organised Skaraborg Brigade (MekB 9). In accordance with that year's Defence Act, the unit was reorganised once again in 2000, and was designated P 4 once again. Its name was also changed back to Skaraborg Regiment.

== Campaigns ==
- None

== Organisation ==
In peacetime Skaraborg Regiment trains conscripts for the Swedish wartime organisation. Skaraborg Regiment trains armoured troops and use the Swedish modified Leopard 2A5 IS, Strv 122, and vehicles from the CV90 family. The peacetime organisation trains one battalion per year with around 600 troops. The main garrison is situated in Skövde in Västergötland and most of the training grounds can be found around Skövde, the regiment also has a smaller detachment in Kvarn in Östergötland where its Grenadier Company is trained.

- Skaraborg Regiment
  - 2nd Brigade Staff
  - 41st Mechanized Battalion
    - Staff and Support Company, 2x Tank Companies Strv 122, 2x Mechanized Companies CV90, Logistic Company
  - 42nd Mechanized Battalion
    - Staff and Support Company, 2x Tank Companies Strv 122, 2x Mechanized Companies CV90, Logistic Company
  - Gotland Battle Group
    - Staff and Support Company, Tank Company Strv 122, Mechanized Company CV90, Logistic Company
  - 1st Heavy Transport Company
  - 2nd Brigade Reconnaissance Company
- Bohusdal Group, which trains the 40th Home Guard Battalion (Light infantry)
- Skaraborg Group, which trains the 38th, and 39th Home Guard battalions (Light infantry)

Training Companies in peacetime:

- Skaraborg Regiment
  - Life Company: training staff and support companies, and engineer platoons of the 41st and 42nd mechanized battalions
  - Skånings Company: training mechanized infantry companies of the 41st and 42nd mechanized battalions
  - Wilska Company: training mechanized infantry companies of the 41st and 42nd mechanized battalions
  - Wartofta Company: training tank companies of the 41st and 42nd mechanized battalions, and Gotland Battle Group
  - Grenadier Company: training brigade reconnaissance company
  - Kåkind Company: basic training
  - Wadsbo Company: training logistics companies of the 41st and 42nd mechanized battalions, and the 1st Heavy Transport Company

Other vehicles used by the regiment: TGB 11, 13 & 20, Bv 206.

== Heraldry and traditions ==
=== Colours, standards and guidons ===
When the regiment was reorganized into an armoured unit, the colour from the time as an infantry unit was kept. The colour was of the 1844 model, and had been presented on 24 June 1858 by Crown Prince Carl Ludvig Eugen (later Charles XV), then in the form of two battalion colours. The colour originally had only two battle honours, Lützen (1632) and Malatitze (1708). After further investigations, the regiment was admitted in 1929 on the colour of the 2nd Battalion, to add six battle honours; Varberg (1565), Narva (1581), Leipzig (1642), Warsaw (1656), Lund (1676) and Landskrona (1677). Until 1994, the regimental colour was the oldest in use when it was replaced by a new colour. The new colour was presented to the regiment at the regimental barracks in Skövde by His Majesty the King Carl XVI Gustaf on 22 September 1995. The colour is drawn by Ingrid Lamby and embroidered by machine in insertion technique by Maj-Britt Salander/company Blå Kusten. Blazon: "On a cloth bended sinister in black and yellow the provincial badge of Västergötland; a double-tailed rampant lion counterchanged, armed red, between two white estoiles in the black field. On a yellow border at the upper side of the colour, battle honours in black."

=== Coat of arms ===
The coat of the arms of the Skaraborg Regiment (P 4/Fo 35) 1977–1994, the Skaraborg Brigade (PB 9/MekB 9) 1994–2000 and Skaraborg Regiment (P 4) since 2000. Blazon: "The provincial badge of Västergötland, per bend sinister sable and or charged with a double-tailed lion rampant counterchanged, armed and langued gules between two estoiles argent in the first field. The shield surmounted two arms in fess, embowed and vambraced, the hands holding swords in saltire, or". The coat of arms of the Skaraborg Regiment (P 4/Fo 35) 1994–2000 and the Skaraborg Group (Skaraborgsgruppen) since 2000. Blazon: "The provincial badge of Västergötland, per bend sinister sable and or charged with a double-tailed lion rampant counter-changed, armed and langued gules between two estoiles argent in the first field. The shield surmounted two swords in saltire, or".

Coat of arms of the Skaraborg Regiment (P 4/Fo 35) 1977–1994, the Skaraborg Brigade (PB 9/MekB 9) 1994–2000 and Skaraborg Regiment (P 4) 2000–present.

Coat of the arms of the Skaraborg Regiment (P 4/Fo 35) 1994–2000 and the Skaraborg Group (Skaraborgsgruppen) 2000–present.

=== Medals ===
In 1942, the Kungl. Skaraborgs regementes (P 4) förtjänstmedalj ("Royal Skaraborg Regiment (P 4) Medal of Merit") in gold (SkarabregGM) was established. When the Skaraborg Brigade was disbanded in 2000, the Skaraborgs regementes och Skaraborgsbrigadens (MekB 9) förtjänstmedalj ("Skaraborg Regiment and Skaraborg Brigade (MekB 9) Medal of Merit") in gold and silver (SkarabregbrigGM/SM) of the 8th size was established in 1999. The medal ribbon is divided in black and yellow moiré with a white stripe on the middle followed on both sides by a red stripe.

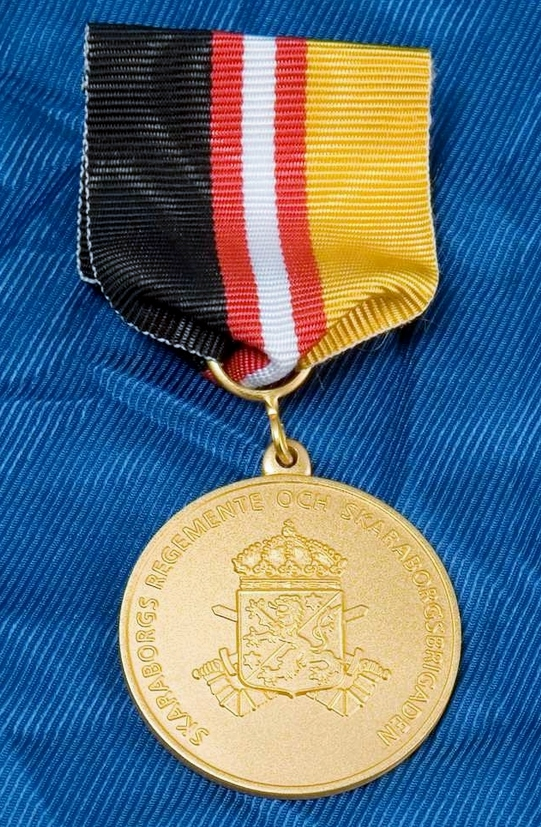
Skaraborg Regiment and Skaraborg Brigade (MekB 9) Medal of Merit.

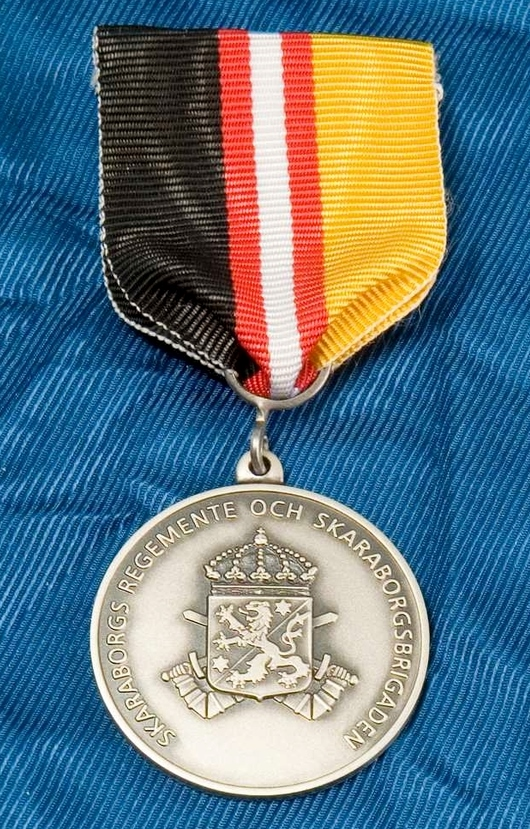
Skaraborg Regiment and Skaraborg Brigade (MekB 9) Medal of Merit.

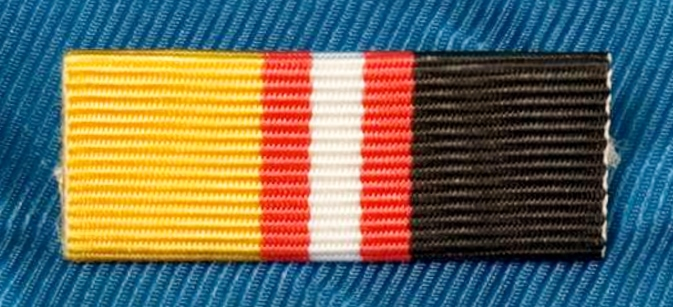
Ribbon of the Skaraborg Regiment and Skaraborg Brigade (MekB 9) Medal of Merit.

=== Other ===
The regimental march is "Geschwindmarsch" by C A Herrmann and it was adopted in the 19th century. It was first played during Gustav IV Adolf's reign. The oldest preserved score is from 1833. It was established as regimental march in 1953 by Army Order 33/1953. The march was used by the Skaraborg Brigade the years 1994–2000, and since 2000 by Skaraborg Group (Skaraborgsgruppen).

The regimental motto, Arvet förpliktar ("The heritage obligates"), originates from Västgöta Regiment (I 6) and was adopted in 1981 by the then regimental commander colonel Norderup in connection with the 350-year anniversary of the Skaraborg Regiment.

Since 1 January 1928, the regiment are continuing the traditions of Västgöta Regiment (I 6). The traditions of Bohuslän Regiment (I 17) is continued by the Bohus Battalion (40th Home Guard Battalion) in the Bohusdal Group (Bohusdalgruppen).

== Commanding officers ==
Regimental commanders active from when the regiment was organized as an armored unit. For regimental commanders before 1942, see Skaraborg Regiment (infantry). For the years 1998–2000, see Skaraborg Regiment and Skaraborg Brigade.

=== Commanders ===
- 1942–1946: Birger Pontén
- 1946–1948: Nils Björk
- 1949–1954: Per Arvid Christian Ahlgren
- 1954–1966: Hans Waldemar Malmgren
- 1966–1967: Hugo Cederschiöld
- 1967–1968: Gustaf Peyron
- 1968–1976: Per Anton Björkman
- 1976–1980: Per-Gunnar Brissman
- 1980–1984: Carl-Gösta Norderup
- 1984–1987: Bror Gustaf Arne Lindblom
- 1987–1992: Lars Jerker Löfberg
- 1992–1993: Alf Sandqvist
- 1993–1995: Björn Anderson
- 1995–1997: Arne Hedman
- 1998–2000: See Skaraborg Regiment and Skaraborg Brigade
- 2000–2004: Anders Lindberg
- 2004–2007: Håkan Swedin
- 2007–2012: Ronald Månsson
- 2012–2017: Fredrik Ståhlberg (Note: From 2013 also commander of the Western Military Region)
- 2017–2021: Bengt Alexandersson
- 2021–2025: Stefan Pettersson
- 2025–20xx: Peter Andersson (acting)

=== Deputy commanders ===
- 2005–2009: Colonel Bengt Alexandersson (acting in 2004)
- 2015–2018: Colonel Stefan Sandborg
- 2018–2019: Colonel Lennart Widerström

== Attributes ==
Name	Translation	From		To
Kungl Skaraborgs pansarregemente	Royal Skaraborg Armoured Regiment	1942-10-01	–	1963-03-30
Kungl Skaraborgs regemente	Royal Skaraborg Regiment	1963-04-01	–	1974-12-31
Skaraborgs regemente	Skaraborg Regiment	1975-01-01	–	1997-12-31
Skaraborgs regemente	Skaraborg Regiment	2000-07-01	–	
Designation		From		To
P 4		1942-10-01	–	1974-06-30
P 4/Fo 35		1974-07-01	–	1997-12-31
P 4		2000-07-01	–	
Location		From		To
Skövde Garrison		1942-10-01	–	

== See also ==
- List of Swedish armoured regiments

== Sources ==
- Braunstein, Christian (2003). Sveriges arméförband under 1900-talet. Skrift / Statens försvarshistoriska museer, 1101-7023; 5 (in Swedish). Stockholm: Statens försvarshistoriska museer. ISBN 91-971584-4-5. SELIBR 8902928.
- Braunstein, Christian (2004). Svenska försvarsmaktens fälttecken efter millennieskiftet [The flags and standards of the Swedish Armed Forces after the turn of the millennium] (PDF). Skrift / Statens försvarshistoriska museer, 1101-7023; 7 [dvs 8] (in Swedish). Stockholm: Statens försvarshistoriska museer. ISBN 91-971584-7-X. SELIBR 9815350.
- Braunstein, Christian (2006). Heraldiska vapen inom det svenska försvaret [Heraldry of the Swedish Armed Forces] (PDF). Skrift / Statens försvarshistoriska museer, 1101-7023; 9 (in Swedish). Stockholm: Statens försvarshistoriska museer. ISBN 91-971584-9-6. SELIBR 10099224.
- Braunstein, Christian (2007). Utmärkelsetecken på militära uniformer [Decorations on Swedish military uniforms] (PDF). Skrift / Statens försvarshistoriska museer, 1101-7023; 12 (in Swedish). Stockholm: Statens försvarshistoriska museer. ISBN 978-91-976220-2-8. SELIBR 10423295.
- Catoni, Mac, ed. (1992). Pansartrupperna 50 år 1992-10-01 (PDF) (in Swedish). [Stockholm]: [s.n.] SELIBR 9958126.
- Kjellander, Bo, ed. (1992). Pansartrupperna 1942–1992 (in Swedish). Skövde: Arméns pansarcentrum. ISBN 91-630-1253-7. SELIBR 7449092.
- Kjellander, Rune (2003). Sveriges regementschefer 1700-2000: chefsbiografier och förbandsöversikter (in Swedish). Stockholm: Probus. ISBN 91-87184-74-5. SELIBR 8981272.
- Sandberg, Bo (2007). Försvarets marscher och signaler förr och nu: marscher antagna av svenska militära förband, skolor och staber samt igenkännings-, tjänstgörings- och exercissignaler (in Swedish) (New ed.). Stockholm: Militärmusiksamfundet med Svenskt marscharkiv. ISBN 978-91-631-8699-8. SELIBR 10413065.
- Handbok: parad 6: traditionsvård : H PARAD 6 2016 (PDF) (in Swedish). Stockholm: Försvarsmakten. 2017. SELIBR 22459606.
- "Försvarsmaktens gemensamma identitet – direktiv för användandet av Försvarsmaktens namn, profil och bild" (PDF). 1.3 (in Swedish). Swedish Armed Forces. 2013-09-16.
