= Swedish Armoured Troops =

Armoured Troops of the Swedish Army

- Pansartrupperna
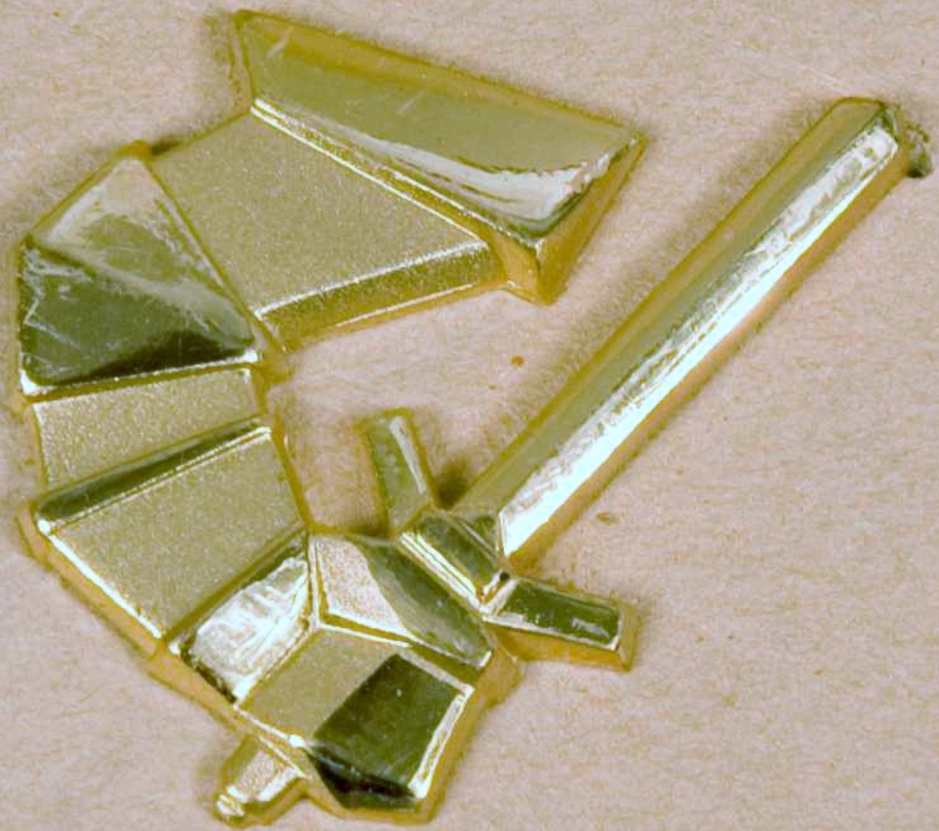
- Branch insignia m/63.
- Active: 1942–present
- Country: Sweden
- Allegiance: Swedish Armed Forces
- Branch: Swedish Army
- Type: Armoured corps
- Part of: Swedish Armed Forces Headquarters (Note: The branch was subordinate the Inspector of the Swedish Armoured Troops (Pansarinspektören) at the Armoured Department of the Army Staff from 1942 to 1991. After that, it was subordinate to the commander of the Swedish Army Armoured Warfare Centre (1991–1995), the commander of the Swedish Army Brigade Center (1995–1997), the commander of the Swedish Army Center (1997–2000), the Joint Forces Command (2000–2005), and the Swedish Armed Forces Headquarters from 2005.)

The Swedish Armoured Troops (Swedish: Pansartrupperna, P) is the armoured branch of the Swedish Army. Since 2005, the Armoured Troops include the South Scanian Regiment (P 7) in Revingehed, Skaraborg Regiment (P 4) in Skövde, Norrbotten Armoured Battalion in Boden, and since 2018 also Gotland Regiment (P 18).

== History ==
=== 1920s–1960s ===
In Sweden, after World War I, a smaller number of tanks were procured. The training with these was located to Svea Life Guards (I 1). According to the Defence Act of 1925, a tank battalion was organized, which was placed to Göta Life Guards (I 2). A tank battalion was organized at Göta Life Guards (I 2) from 1928 to 1939 and after the regiment was disbanded in 1939, tank battalions were organized in Skaraborg Regiment (I 9) and Södermanland Regiment (I 10) between 1939 and 1942. Parallel attempts were made with armored cars in the cavalry between 1925 and 1942 and with motorized brigade between 1940 and 1942.

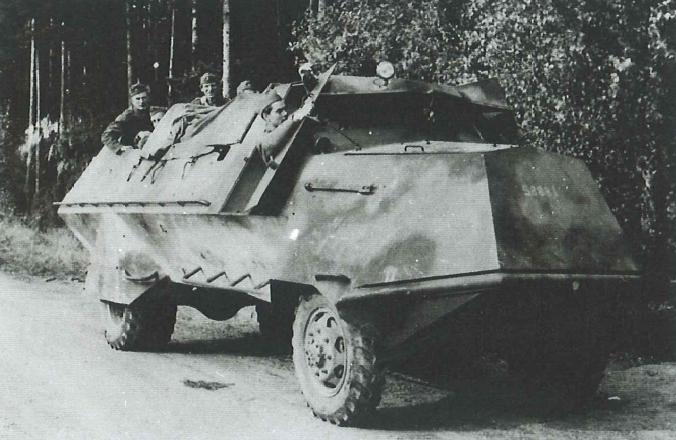
A KP-bil in 1943.

The Swedish Armoured Troops were formed on 1 October 1942. According to the Defence Act of 1942, the armoured troops were organized in peace-time as an independent branch of four armoured regiments (Göta Armoured Life Guards, Scanian Armoured Regiment, Södermanland Armoured Regiment and Skaraborg Armoured Regiment). The Swedish Armoured Troops were organized in war-time in armoured brigades consisting of, among other things, a tank and two armoured infantry battalions and an artillery battalion.

The four armored brigades – Pbrig m/43 – were created to meet the need for powerful attack units that could break through a defensive position and quickly proceed behind enemy lines. The brigades would be trained and organized by the aforementioned four regiments:

- Göta Armoured Life Guards (P 1) in Enköping with a company (P 1 G) at I 18 in Visby – the resurrected Göta Life Guards
- Scanian Armoured Regiment (P 2) in Helsingborg, the converted K 2
- Södermanland Armoured Regiment (P 3) in Strängnäs – former I 10
- Skaraborg Armoured Regiment (P 4) in Skövde – former I 9.

Two educational institutions were also formed, the Swedish Armoured Troops School (PS) – located at P 4, and the Swedish Armoured Troops Officer Candidate School (POAS) – located at P 3 – later to P 1. The war-organized brigades had two tanks battalions and one panzergrenadier battalion with KP-bil's, among others. The design of the field brigades, together with newly acquired war experiences from World War II, resulted in the 1949 parliamentary decision that also Svea Life Guards (I 1) in Sörentorp, Älvsborg Regiment (I 5) in Borås and the South Scanian Infantry Regiment (I 7) in Ystad were converted to armoured infantry regiments under the Inspector of the Swedish Armoured Troops' jurisdiction to ensure a unified training closely related to the existing armoured regiments and a joint brigade production of five brigades – Pbrig 49.

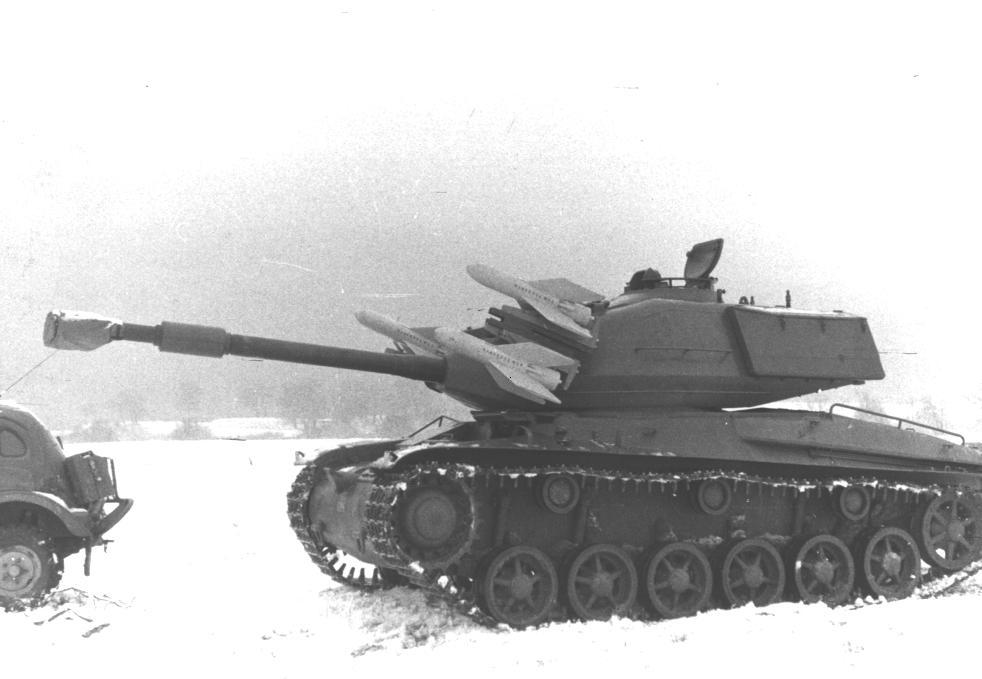
A Stridsvagn 74 fitted with SS.11 missiles in Gotland in 1965.

This brigade organization with, among other things, different rates of movement between the tanks and armoured infantry battalions (the main part on military bicycles) reduced the brigade's attack power and was quickly outrun by international development with its demands for higher standards, mobility and constant division in the battlefield. Already at the end of the war, Sweden was unhelpful in technical development. Therefore, a large number of heavy tanks (Centurion) were purchased in 1953 and a reorganization – Pbrig 58 – started with mixed battalions which included a tank and two bicycle transporting infantry companies, one of which could be transported on KP-bil's. Attacks were carried out on foot and the tank was given a supporting role. The attack speed was limited to 5 km/h. Older tanks' gun turrets were used as gun turret fortifications at ports and airfields, and Stridsvagn m/41 and Stridsvagn m/42 were rebuilt into Pansarbandvagn 301 and Stridsvagn 74 respectively.

At the armoured regiments, assault gun companies (Infanterikanonvagn 72, 73, 102 and 103) were also trained, self-propelled anti-tank companies (Pansarvärnskanonvagn m/43), anti-aircraft gun platoons (40 mm L/60) and crews for self-propelled assault guns (Stormartillerivagn m/43). In 1957, the Norrbotten Armoured Battalion (P 5) was raised to meet the needs of armoured combat units in Upper Norrland. In the same year, P 3 was reorganized into I 10 and became an armoured infantry regiment. I 1 returned to the infantry.

=== 1960s–1980s ===
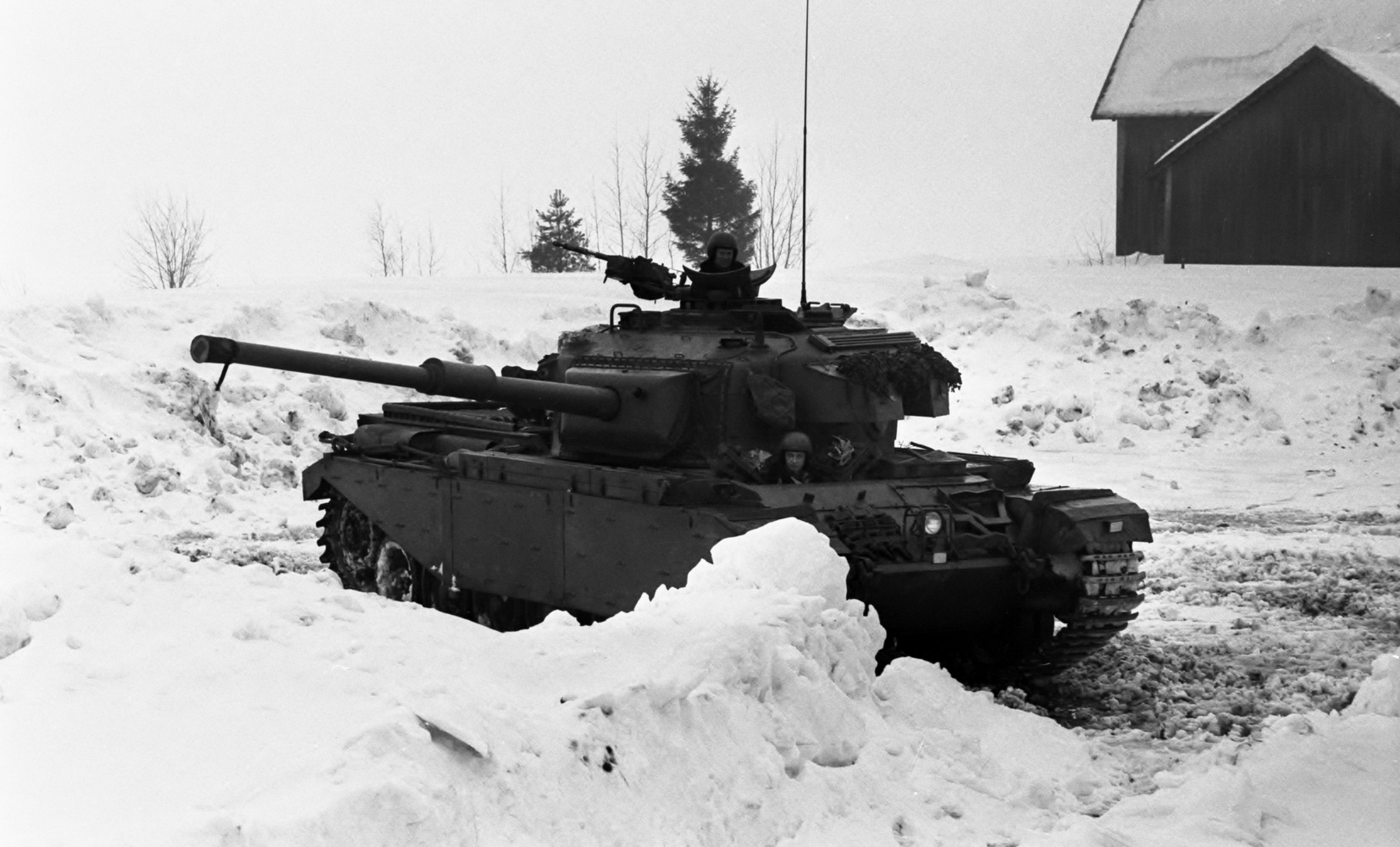
Stridsvagn 101 (Centurion) in 1965.

In order to increase the attack force of the armoured brigade, extensive materiel and organizational experiments were carried out in the early 1960s. The final product became Pbrig 63 with armoured battalions consisting of two self-propelled panzergrenadier companies (Pansarbandvagn 301 and later Pansarbandvagn 302) and two tanks with either Centurion (Stridsvagn 101, 102) or the unconventionally Swedish-built S-Tank (Stridsvagn 103) as main tank and its own artillery (10.5 cm howitzer). Pbrig 63, with its mobile, firepower, integrated and combat technology well thought out organization, attracted great international interest and praise. The peace organization changed so that I 6, I 7, I 10 and I 18 became new armoured regiments while I 15 returned to the infantry.

The reduction of defence appropriations in the 1970s and 1980s forced reductions in both the war and peace organizations. In 1971, the war organization consisted of six armoured brigades, four Norrland brigades, 21 infantry brigades, about 100 command, support and maintenance battalions, and about 100 local defence battalions. In the late 1970s, the fully motorized infantry brigade 77 was introduced, but half of the older infantry brigades and two of the armored brigades were disbanded. P 1 was disbanded in 1980 and the Swedish Armoured Troops Cadet and Officer Candidate School (PKAS) was amalgamated with the Swedish Armoured Troops School (PS) in Skövde. P 10's armoured brigade was reorganized into a mechanized brigade.

=== 1990s–2000s ===
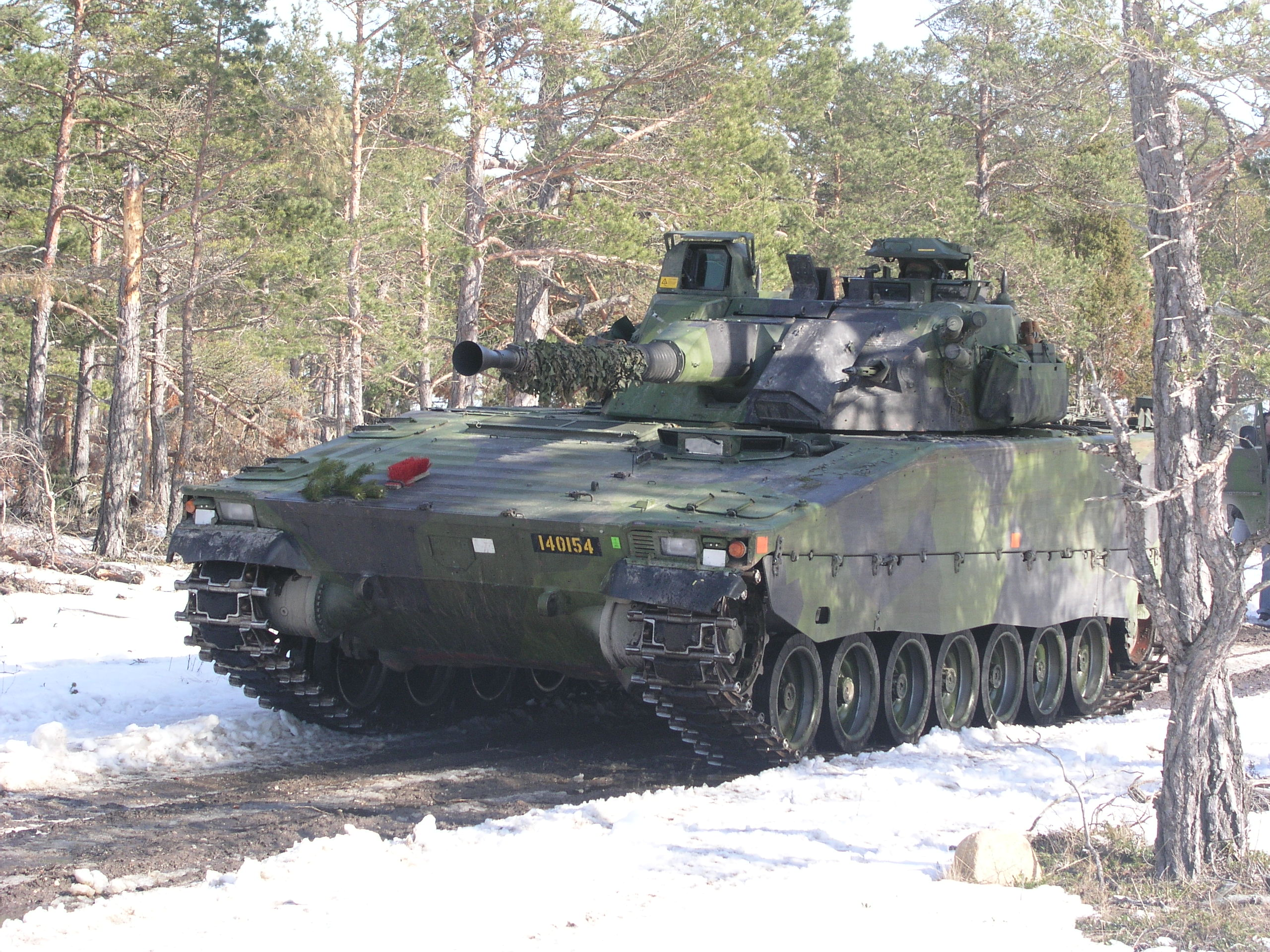
A Combat Vehicle 9040 of Gotland Regiment (P 18) in 2005.

In 1994, the organization changed by introducing the concept of mechanized brigade. At that time, the army's field units consisted of two armoured brigades, four mechanized brigades (fewer tanks than the armored brigades), seven infantry brigades and four Norrland brigades. The mechanization process of these two later brigade types continued during the 1990s with the goal of forming fully mechanized brigades in 2000 (IB 2000/NB 2000). However, all brigades were disbanded in the war organization according to the Defence Act of 2000.

The procurement of the Leopard 2 system started in 1991. After evaluation in 1994 the German Leopard 2 Improved (Stridsvagn 122) was elected. Stridsvagn 122 would replace Stridsvagn 103 in the armoured brigades. Sweden was also given the opportunity to acquire used Leopard 2A4 (Stridsvagn 121) at a low price, which would replace the Centurion's in the mechanized brigades. The deliveries of the 120 Stridsvagn 122 began in 1997 and were completed in 2002. The transfer of the 160 pcs used Leopard 2A4 (Stridsvagn 121) to Sweden was completed in 1995. In connection with the acquisition of Leopard 2, the remaining Stridsvagn 101 and Stridsvagn 102 began to be eliminated in 1992 pending scrapping. Remaining were 80 Stridsvagn 104 at the Kristianstad Brigade (PB 26), but this brigade would disbanded in 1994. In connection with this, 60 tanks from the Kristianstad Brigade were transferred in 1992 to Södermanland Brigade (MekB 10), where they were in service until 1994, when they were transferred to Gotland to upgrade and modernize the Gotland Brigade (MekB 18). The tanks came to serve at the Gotland Brigade until the Defence Act of 2000, when the tank training stopped at the brigade and Stridsvagn 104's were scrapped.

In 2000, the Defence Materiel Administration (FMV) was commissioned by the Swedish Armed Forces to dismantle Stridsvagn 103, Stridsvagn 104, Brobandvagn 941, Bärgningsbandvagn 81, Bärgningsbandvagn 82, Infanterikanonvagn 91, Luftvärnsrobotvagn 701 and Pansarvärnsrobotvagn 551. Bärgningsbandvagn 81 was eliminated after 2004 and was replaced by the Bärgningsbandvagn 120.

=== 2010s–present ===
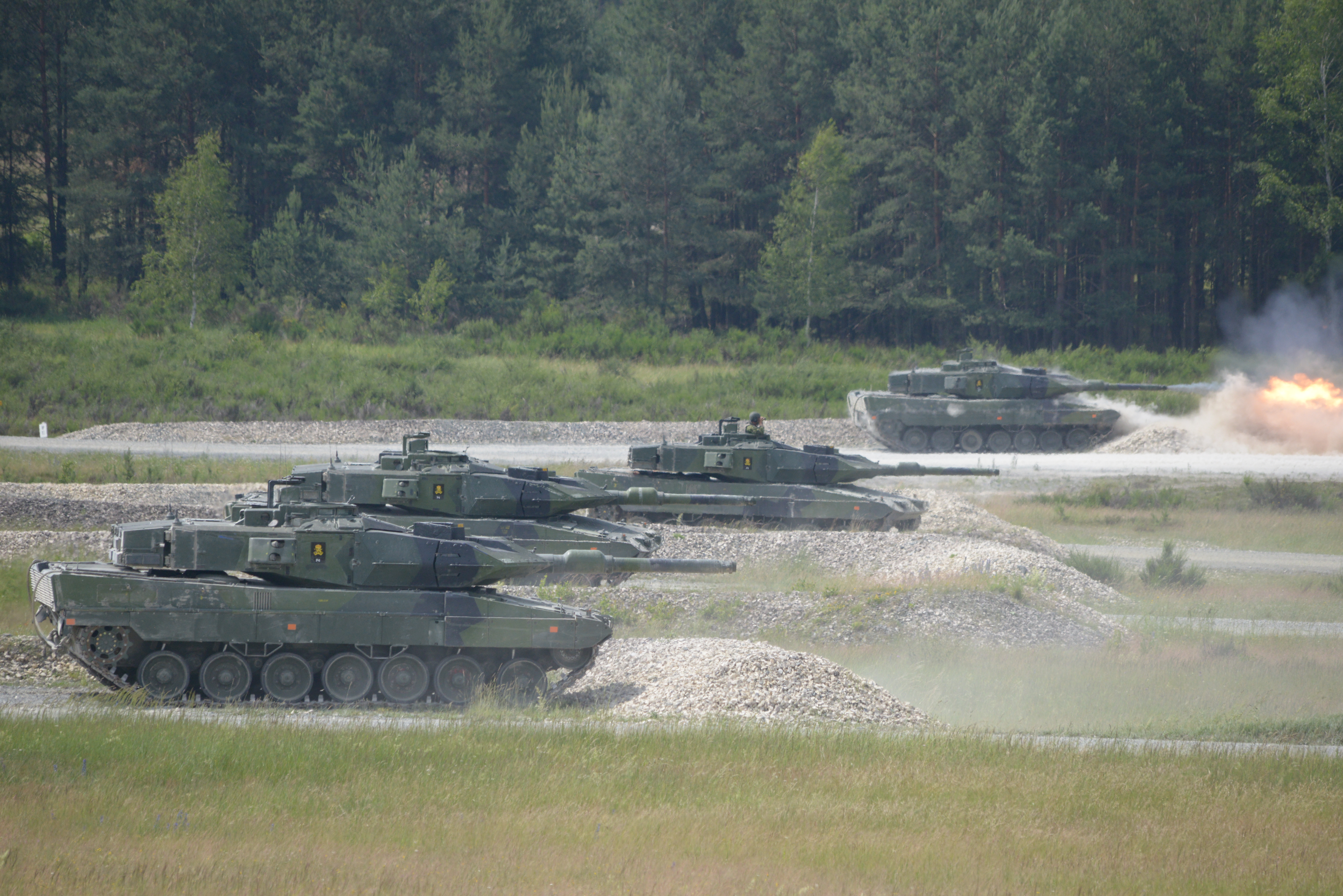
Stridsvagn 122's of Skaraborg Regiment (P 4) in 2018.

The Swedish Armoured Troops consist in 2020s of South Scanian Regiment (P 7) in Revingehed, Skaraborg Regiment (P 4) in Skövde, and since 2018 also Gotland Regiment (P 18). P 7 consist, among other units, of the 71st Battalion, a motorized infantry battalion equipped with Pansarterrängbil 360, and the 72nd Battalion, a mechanized battalion equipped with Stridsvagn 122 and Combat Vehicle 90. P 4 consist, among other units, of the 41st and the 42nd Armoured Battalion. The main weapon systems of the armored battalions are Stridsvagn 122, Combat Vehicle 9040, 12 cm grenade launchers and anti-air vehicles. P 18 consists, among other units, of the 181st Armoured Battalion, formed in January 2020.

In Upper Norrland, the Norrbotten Armoured Battalion has operated since 1957. Today its part of Norrbotten Regiment (I 19). The Norrbotten Armoured Battalion is organized for the daily production of war units and consists of personnel from the 191st and 192nd Mechanized Battalions.

== Inspector of the Swedish Armoured Troops ==
The chief of the armoured troops was referred to as the Inspector of the Swedish Armoured Troops (Pansarinspektören). The Inspector was from 1991 to 1995 the head of the Swedish Army Armoured Center (PaC). Below is a list of inspectors between 1942 and 1995.

Over the years, the inspector had largely retained the areas of responsibility he was initially assigned, but in an expanded and changed form. Type unit and functional responsibilities as well as the introduction of new equipment and combat vehicles were some of the inspector's most important tasks. Human resources were another very important part where the inspector was individual planning responsible for lieutenant colonels and majors who had completed the Swedish Armed Forces Staff College's higher course (except the Chief of the Army's commanders' group) and the last certifying commander for these. He was also the head of the promotion unit, which submitted proposals to the Chief of the Army on suitable armored officers for promotion.

=== Officeholders ===
No.	Portrait	Name	Took office	Left office	Time in office	Chief of the Army Staff	Ref.
1	Pehr Janse	Colonel; Pehr Janse (1893–1961)	1942	1945	2–3 years	Colonel; Henry Tottie; Major general Hugo Gadd	–
2	Gunnar Berggren	Colonel; Gunnar Berggren (1893–1972)	1945	1946	0–1 years	Major general Hugo Gadd	–
3	Birger Pontén	Colonel; Birger Pontén (1895–1976)	1946	1956	9–10 years	Major general Ivar Backlund; Major general Viking Tamm; Major general Bert Carpelan	–
4	Gustav Åkerman	Colonel; Gustav Åkerman (1901–1988)	1956	1957	0–1 years	Major general Bert Carpelan	–
5	Malcolm Murray	Colonel; Malcolm Murray (1904–1995)	1957	1960	2–3 years	Major general Gustav Åkerman	–
6	Tage Olihn	Colonel; Tage Olihn (1908–1996)	1960	1963	2–3 years	Major general Gustav Åkerman; Major general Arne Mohlin	–
7	Per-Hjalmar Bauer	Colonel; Per-Hjalmar Bauer (1906–1977)	1963	1967	3–4 years	Major general Stig Synnergren; Major general Ove Ljung	–
8	Hugo Cederschiöld	Colonel; Hugo Cederschiöld (1915–1982)	1967	1976	8–9 years	Major general Ove Ljung; Major general Karl Eric Holm; Major general Lennart Ljung; Major general Gösta Hökmark	–
9	Per Björkman	Senior colonel Per Björkman (1919–2014)	1 April 1976	1980	3–4 years	Major general Gösta Hökmark; Major general Robert Lugn	
10	Björn Zickerman	Senior colonel Björn Zickerman (1923–2014)	1980	1983	2–3 years	Major general Robert Lugn	–
11	Curt Hasselgren	Senior colonel Curt Hasselgren (1924–2018)	1 October 1983	31 March 1985	1–2 years	Major general Krister Larsson	
12	Håkan Waernulf	Senior colonel Håkan Waernulf (1935–2021)	1 April 1985	30 June 1990	4–5 years	Major general Krister Larsson; Major general Curt Sjöö	
13	Stig Edgren	Senior colonel Stig Edgren (1933–2016)	1 July 1990	30 September 1993	2–3 years	Major general Lennart Rönnberg	
14	Alf Sandqvist	Senior colonel Alf Sandqvist (born 1945)	1 October 1993	30 June 1995	1–2 years	Major general Lennart Rönnberg	

== Insignias ==
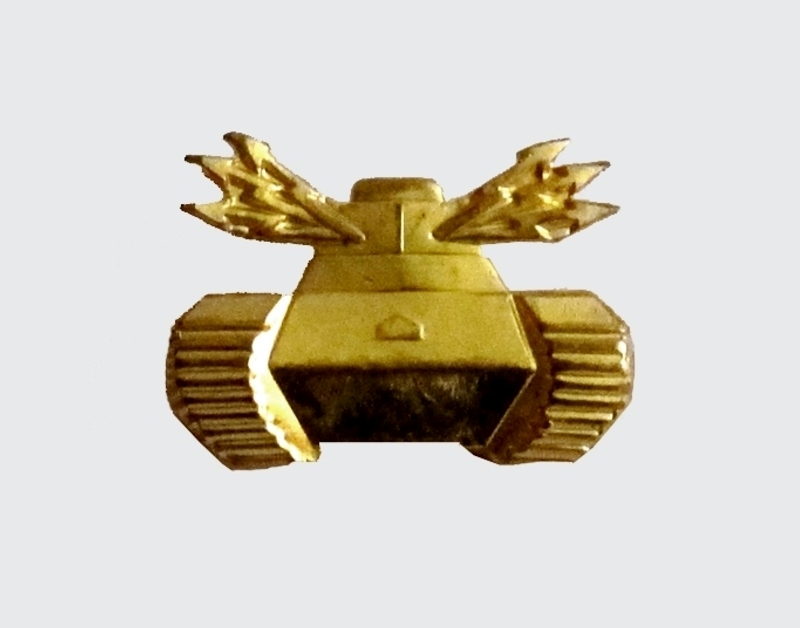
Branch insignia m/52-60. Also known as Pansargrodan ("Iron Frog").

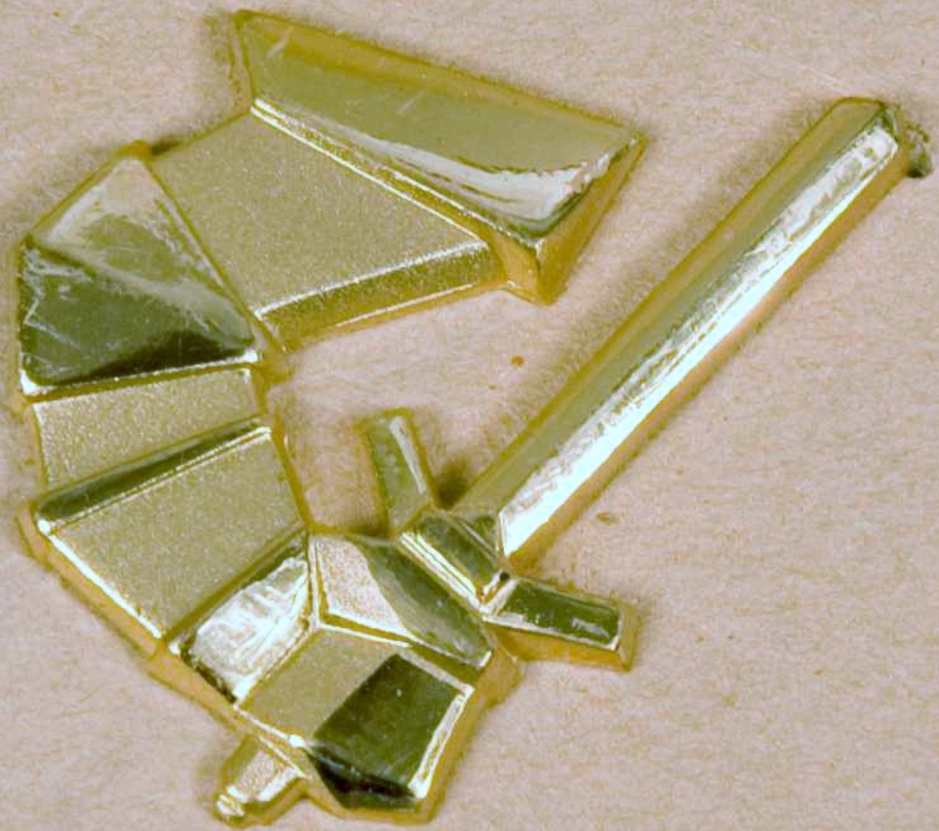
Branch insignia m/1963.

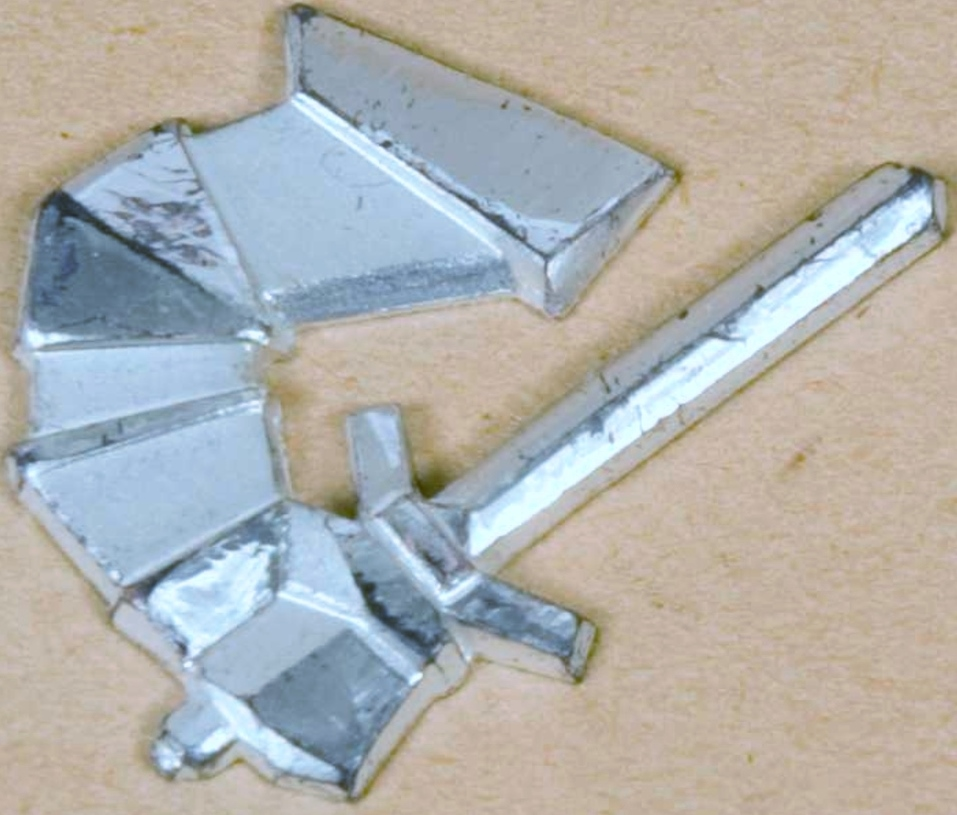
Branch insignia m/1963. Only used for Göta Life Guards (P 1).

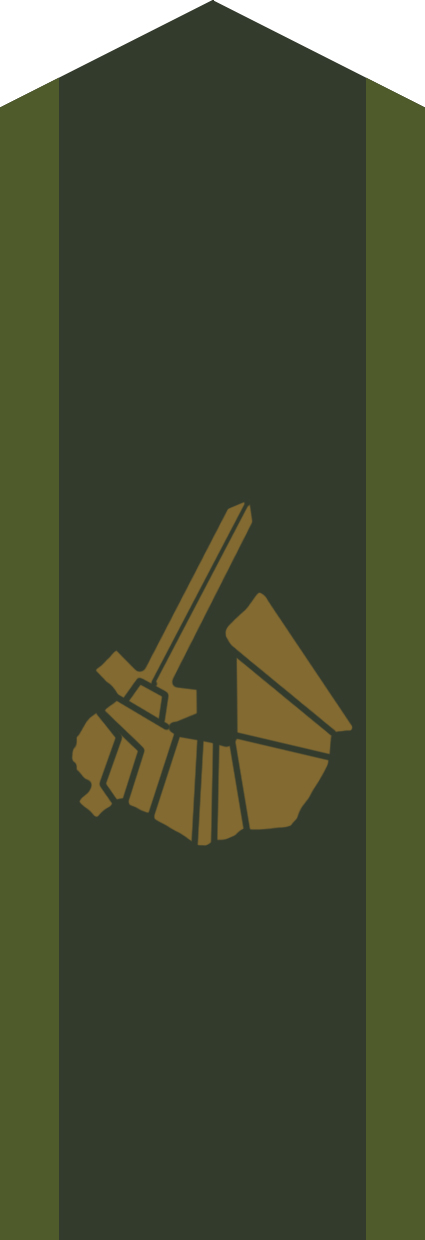
Collar patch m/58.

== See also ==
- Swedish Engineer Troops
- Swedish Army Signal Troops
- Swedish Army Service Troops
- List of Swedish armoured regiments
