= Ulf Henricsson =

Swedish colonel and brigade commander

Ulf Henricsson KSO1kl
- Born: Ulf Hugo Henricsson; 1 February 1942 (age 84); Stockholm, Sweden
- Military career
- Branch: Swedish Army
- Service years: 1969–2002
- Rank: Senior Colonel
- Nickname: "Sheriff of Vareš"
- Units: Göta Life Guards (1969–79); Svea Life Guards (1983–84)
- Commands: Armoured Troops Combat School; Södermanland Brigade; Eastern Army Division
- Other work: Head of SLMM

Senior Colonel Ulf Hugo Henricsson (born 1 February 1942) is a former Swedish officer. He is best known for his achievements in the Bosnian War as commander of the peacekeeping operations from September 1993 to April 1994. There he commanded the Nordic battalion (Nordbat 2) which was a part of the United Nations Protection Force (UNPROFOR).

== Early life ==
Henricsson was born on 1 February 1942 in Engelbrekt Parish, Stockholm, Sweden. Henricson grew up on the farm Svarttorp south of Järna.

== Military career ==
=== Early career ===
Henricsson graduated from the Military Academy Karlberg in 1969 and was commissioned as an officer at the Göta Life Guards with the rank of second lieutenant. Henricsson attended the Swedish Armed Forces Staff College from 1979 to 1981 and served as a general staff officer and department chief in the Army Staff from 1981 to 1983. He was then company commander in the Svea Life Guards from 1983 to 1984 and commander of the Ground Operations Department in the staff of the Eastern Military District from 1984 to 1986. Henricsson served as battalion commander in the Skaraborg Regiment (P 4) from 1986 to 1987 and from 1987 to 1990 he was system leader for Combat Vehicle 90 and the Swedish tank programme in the Army Staff. Henricsson was commanding officer of the Swedish Armoured Troops Combat School (Pansartruppernas stridsskola, PS) from 1990 to 1991 before being appointed brigade commander of the Södermanland Brigade in 1991.

=== Bosnian War ===
During September 1993 to April 1994 he served as commanding officer of the Nordic battalion (Nordbat 2), part of the United Nations Protection Force (UNPROFOR), which consisted of the first Swedish battalion (BA01) to be deployed in Yugoslavia during the Bosnian War. The battalion consisted of 840 soldiers in three mechanized infantry companies and one staff and tross company. Together with a Danish tank company (DANSQN) and a Norwegian field hospital (NORMEDCOY), it formed the battalion Nordbat 2. The battalion headquarters was in Živinice outside Tuzla. Its area of responsibility started north in the Posavina Corridor 10 kilometres south of Brčko, to some 10 kilometres south of Vareš in central Bosnia.

Henricsson and his soldiers became known for redrawing the rules of international peacekeeping by aggressively protecting civilians, tactics not popular among U.N. officials. His robust approach impressed his UNPROFOR commander Michael Rose, the press corps, his Danish colleagues in Nordbat 2 and the local parties. At home, his robust approach did not go down well with the traditionalists, who accused the Swedish contingent of being trigger-happy and too aggressive. The result on the ground proved the critics wrong, however, and Henricsson's approach was eventually codified in the Swedish peace support operations doctrine published in 1997.

In Vareš, Henricsson and his soldiers saved the lives of 200 men and boys detained in a school. On 2 April 1996, Henricsson testified against Ivica Rajić in the International Criminal Tribunal for the former Yugoslavia for his involvement in the Stupni Do massacre.

=== Later career ===
Back in Sweden, Henricsson continued commanding the Södermanland Brigade until 1994 and was then commanding officer of the Eastern Army Division from 1994 to 1999. He was head of the OSSE Department for Regional Stabilisation in Sarajevo from 1999 to 2001. Since 2002, brigadier Henricsson has been head of the Department of Leadership and Management at the Swedish Defence University. On 22 February 2006, Henricsson was appointed as the new head of the Sri Lanka Monitoring Mission effective from 1 April 2006, replacing Brigadier Hagrup Haukland. He left the position on 1 September 2006.

== Personal life ==
Henricsson is married to Lena and has four sons.

Henricsson has appeared in TV3's television programme Grannfejden as mediator as well as in TV8's Nyhetsfajten.

Henricsson became a member of the Royal Swedish Academy of War Sciences in 1996 and served four years as chairman of the Land Warfare Studies Department.

He is also a board member of Södertälje Hospital in Södertälje.

== Awards and decorations ==
- (Sweden) Commander 1st Class of the Royal Order of the Sword (21 March 2024) with the citation: "For great exemplary leadership during war-like conditions in former Yugoslavia"
- (Sweden) Swedish Armed Forces International Service Medal of Reward in gold with swords (Note: In the book Utlandsstyrkan i fredens tjänst (2006), the medal is wrongly named as Försvarsmaktens medalj för internationella insatser i guld i blått band med svärd i guld ("Swedish Armed Forces International Service Medal") (not including the word belöning, "reward") which is a different medal which does include swords. On Ulf Henricsson's own website, it is named as Överbefälhavarens förtjänstmedalj i guld med svärd för internationella insatser (literally "Supreme Commander's Medal of Merit in gold with swords for international service"), (not including the words Försvarsmakten, "Swedish Armed Forces") and belöningsmedalj ("medal of reward").) (17 November 1997) with the citation: "As commander repeatedly demonstrated personal courage which led to significant good example during service in September 1993-April 1994" (awarded on 4 March 1998)
- (Sweden) Royal Swedish Academy of War Sciences Medal of Reward in gold (Kungl. Krigsvetenskapsakademiens belöningsmedalj i guld)

== Bibliography ==
- Henricsson, Ulf (2013). När Balkan brann!: överste 1. Ulf Henricsson om sitt krig i Bosnien och hur han blev "sheriffen i Vareš" [When Balkans burned!: Brig. Ulf Henricsson about his war in Bosnia and how he became the "Sheriff of Vareš"] (in Swedish). Stockholm: Svenskt militärhistoriskt bibliotek. ISBN 9789186837402.
- Henricsson, Ulf; Vlk, Magnus; Ålrud, Magnus (1997). Ledarskap i krigsliknande situationer: redigerade bilder ur verkligheten : BA 01 1993-94 [Leadership in war-like situations: edited images of reality : BA 01 1993-94]. LI. Serie I, 1401-5676; 4 (in Swedish). Stockholm: Ledarskapsinstitutionen, Försvarshögsk.

== Footnotes ==
Military offices
Preceded by Nils Rosenquist	Eastern Army Division; 1 October 1994–3 July 1999	Succeeded by Roland Ekenberg
Preceded by Hagrup Haukland	Head of Sri Lanka Monitoring Mission; 1 April 2006–1 September 2006	Succeeded by Lars Johan Sølvberg
