= Göta Life Guards =

Göta Life Guards may refer to:

- Göta Life Guards (infantry), see List of Swedish infantry regiments (1742–1939)
- Göta Life Guards (armoured), Swedish Army armoured regiment (1943–1980)
