= Södermanland Regiment =

Södermanland Regiment may refer to:

- Södermanland Regiment (infantry), Swedish Army infantry regiment (1634 - 1942, 1957–1963)
- Södermanland Regiment (armoured), Swedish Army armoured regiment (1942–1957, 1963–2005)
