= Göta Life Guards (infantry) =

Unit of the Swedish Army

- Göta livgarde
- Active: 1809–1939
- Country: Sweden
- Allegiance: Swedish Armed Forces
- Branch: Swedish Army
- Type: Infantry
- Size: Regiment
- Part of: 4th Military District (1833–1888); 5th Military District (1889–1893); 4th Army Division (1893–1901); IV Army Division (1902–1927); Eastern Army Division (1928–1936); IV Army Division (1937–1939)
- Garrison/HQ: Stockholm, Vaxholm
- Colors: Red
- March: "Göta livgardes marsch" (Schubert) (Note: The unit march was adopted in 1890. The march was used by the Göta Life Guards (P 1) from 1943 to 1980.)
- Battle honours: Svensksund 1790

The Göta Life Guards (Swedish: Göta livgarde), also I 2, was a Swedish Army infantry regiment active from 1809 to 1939. Its origins trace back to several earlier military units, including a regiment formed in 1741 by Count Gustaf David Hamilton, aimed at relieving the burden on regular regiments. In the late 1700s, the regiment underwent various reorganizations, with a significant merger of parts of the Queen Dowager's Life Regiment and the Björnberg Regiment, leading to the formation of His Majesty's Second Guard Regiment in 1792.

In 1806, the regiment became the Swedish Guard Regiment and was later renamed the Göta Life Guards in 1894. Based in Stockholm, the regiment remained active until its disbandment in 1939. However, plans for its reorganization were set in motion, transitioning it into a tank battalion and fortress battalion.

Initially stationed in barracks shared with other life guard units, the regiment moved to new barracks on Linnégatan in 1890. In 1928, parts of the Vaxholm Grenadier Regiment formed the Fortress Battalion of the Göta Life Guards, stationed in Vaxholm, but it was disbanded along with the regiment in 1939. The reorganization set the foundation for the creation of the Göta Armour Guards Regiment (P 1) in 1942.

== History ==
The Göta Life Guards trace their origins to several earlier military units, primarily to a regiment raised in 1741 by Count Gustaf David Hamilton. The purpose was to reduce the burden of garrison duty on the regular allotment-based regiments. During the 1770s, the organization underwent several changes. In 1773, Colonel Lars Fredrik von Kaulbars established the 3rd Battalion of the Queen Dowager's Life Regiment (Änkedrottningens livregemente). This battalion was soon separated from its parent regiment, which was based in Finland, and relocated to Stockholm. Following the coup of 1772, parts of this regiment, along with elements of the Björnberg Regiment (Björnbergska regementet), were merged into the Queen Dowager's Life Regiment. This merger ended in 1793, when the battalion was separated and combined with the so-called Life Brigade (Livbrigaden), taking the name Enlisted Battalion of the Life Regiment Brigade's Light Infantry (Värvade bataljonen av Livregementsbrigadens lätta infanteri). In 1789, Sweden raised four corps to participate in the ongoing Russo-Swedish War (1788–90). After the war, these formed His Majesty's Second Guard Regiment (Kunglig Majestäts andra gardesregemente), which was renamed The King's Göta Life Guards (Konungens Göta livgarde) in 1792 and later the Swedish Guard Regiment (Svenska gardesregementet) in 1806.

In 1796, the enlisted battalion was renamed the Enlisted Infantry of the Life Regiment (Livregementets värvade infanteri), with a strength of 696 men. In 1803, it was separated from the Life Brigade and renamed the Finnish Guard Regiment (Finska gardesregementet), stationed at garrisons in Sveaborg and Borgå. However, it returned to Stockholm in 1805. During the Finnish War, the regiment took part in several landings and battles along the Finnish coast. That same year, both the Swedish and Finnish Guard Regiments lost their status as guard units, due to King Gustav IV Adolf's growing mistrust. For a time, the Finnish Guard was known as the Palén Regiment (af Palénska regementet) and was reorganized into ten companies of 80 men each. Following the Coup of 1809, the regiment regained its guard status, and the two units were merged into the Second Guard Regiment (Andra gardesregementet), which in 1818 was renamed the King's Second Life Guards (Konungens Andra livgarde). A field battalion from the regiment took part in the campaigns of 1813 and 1814. In 1830, the regiment was organized into eight companies of 100 men each. By 1876, it comprised a total of 907 personnel, including officers, enlisted men, and support staff. In 1894, the regiment received its final name, Göta Life Guards. By 1908, it consisted of 47 officers, 50 non-commissioned officers, eight civilian military staff, and 555 full-time soldiers. The regiment was on permanent active duty and stationed in Stockholm.

According to the Defence Act of 1925, the regiment was to be disbanded. However, two years later it was decided that it would continue to exist, reorganized into a tank battalion based in Stockholm and a fortress battalion based in Vaxholm—a structure that remained in place until the regiment's disbandment in 1939. Following the Defence Act of 1942, the regiment was re-established, but as the Göta Armour Guards Regiment (P 1) and was stationed at the Enköping garrison.

== Barracks and detachment ==
=== Barracks ===
As a recruited life guard, the regiment was initially billeted with the bourgeoisie in Stockholm within the Stockholm garrison. In 1833, the crown purchased the former shipyard Terra Nova, and along Grev Magnigatan, three large barracks buildings were constructed according to architect Carl Christoffer Gjörwell's designs, which were possibly completed as early as 1829.

In 1890, the regiment moved into a new barracks complex on Linnégatan, with Svea Life Guards as its neighbor. Two essentially identical barracks complexes were built for Göta Life Guards and Svea Life Guards, with their main facades facing Linnégatan. The buildings were designed by Ernst Jacobsson, one of Sweden's leading barracks architects. The two barracks complexes were completed two years apart: Svea Life Guards in 1888 and Göta Life Guards in 1890.

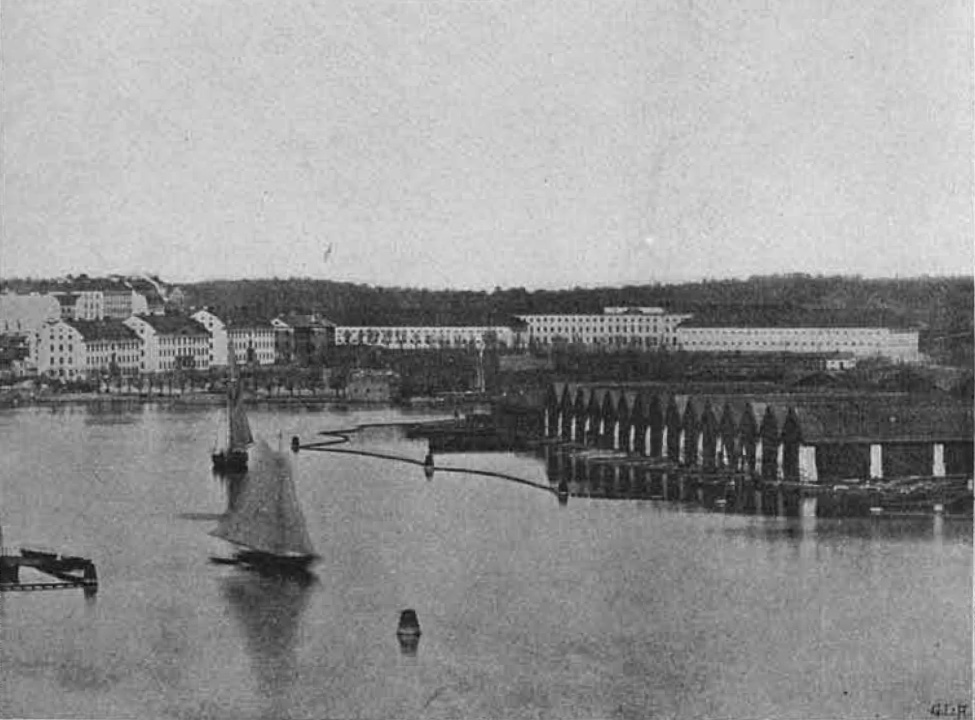
Barracks belonging to the Second Life Guards and the Life Guards of Horse (on the left and in the center, respectively), Stockholm

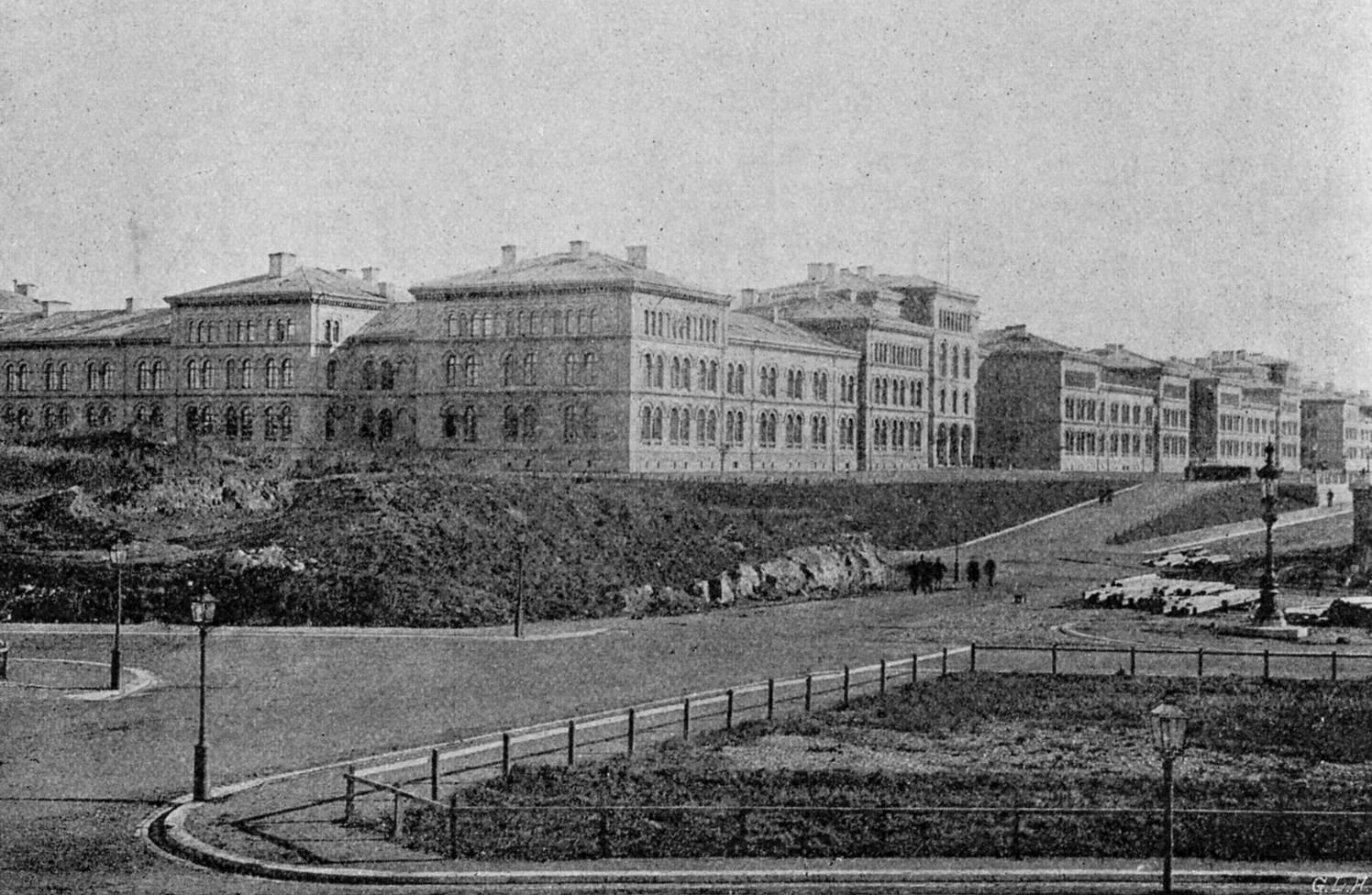
The palatial foot guards barracks at Linnégatan in Stockholm, inaugurated in 1888 (I 1) and 1890 (I 2).

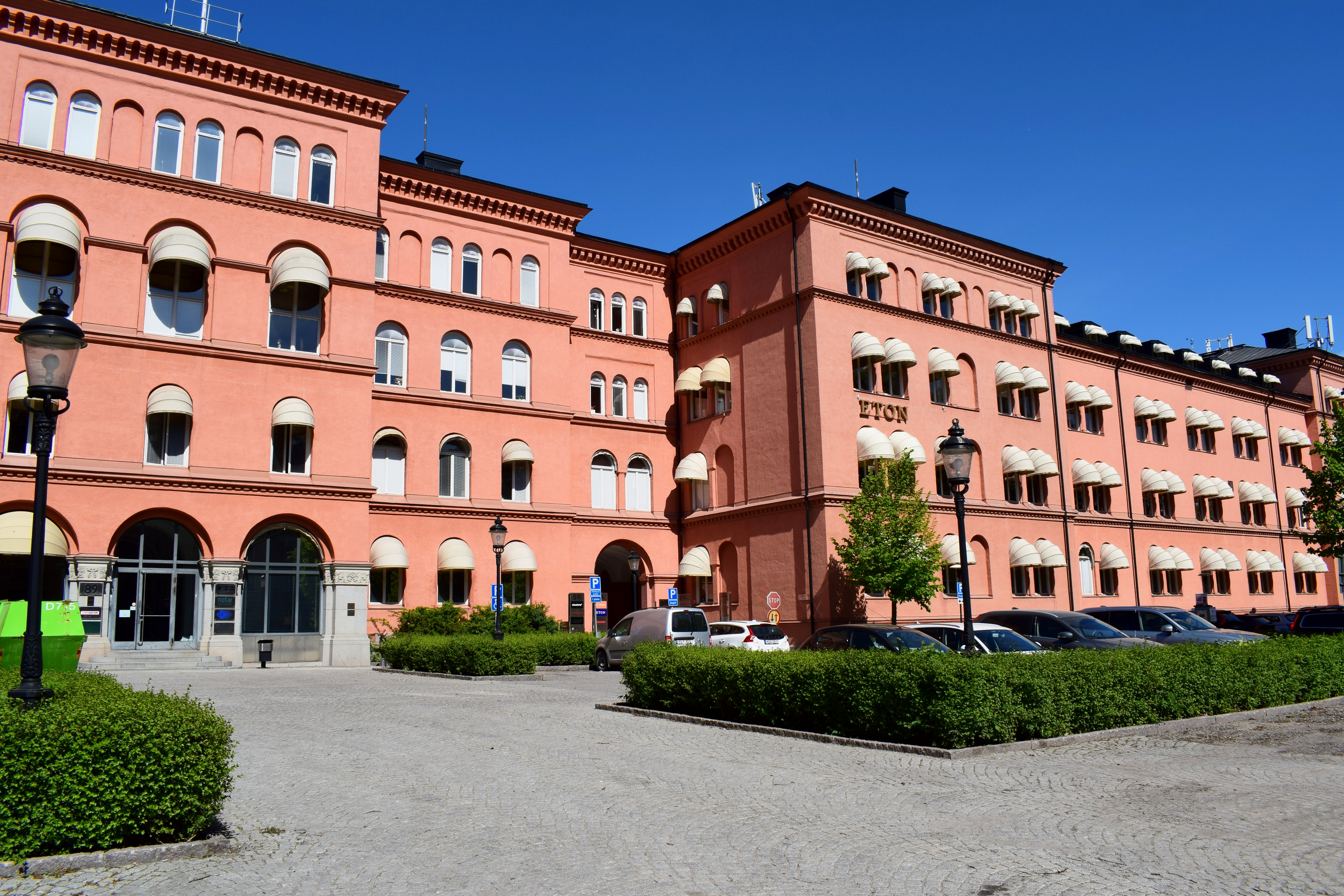
The Eastern Barracks on Linnégatan in Stockholm where Göta Life Guards were stationed from 1890 to 1939.

=== Detachment ===
As part of the Defence Act of 1925, it was decided that the Vaxholm Grenadier Regiment would be disbanded 31 December 1927. However, parts of the regiment's organization remained, as one battalion was retained within the army from 1 January 1928, as a reduced archipelago infantry battalion. The battalion was placed under Göta Life Guards (I 2) and named Göta Life Guard's Fortress Battalion (I 2 V). The battalion remained stationed in Vaxholm and consisted of a battalion headquarters and three companies (the Life Company, the 2nd Company, and the Machine Gun Company). The battalion was subject to two authorities: administration and training were under the responsibility of Göta Life Guards, while for war planning and mobilization, the battalion came under the command of the commander of Vaxholm Fortress, who was an officer from the navy. Following the Defence Act of 1936, the battalion was disbanded along with Göta Life Guards on 30 September 1939. The barracks area freed up on Rindö was taken over by the Vaxholm Coastal Artillery Regiment in 1941.

== Heraldry and traditions ==
=== Colours, standards and guidons ===
The Göta Life Guards was the only unit bearing the name "Göta" to be stationed in Svealand, whereas all other “Göta units” were based in Götaland. In 1850, the regiment was awarded two regimental colours, replacing the earlier guard colors introduced during the time when Charles XIV John served as regimental commander. The 1850 colours were white and featured the Greater Coat of Arms of Sweden on the cloth.

In 1894, the regiment received two new colours, each inscribed with the text "Royal Göta Life Guards, 1st Battalion" and "Royal Göta Life Guards, 2nd Battalion", respectively. Both flags also bore the battle honour Svensksund. These colours were carried by the regiment until its disbandment on 30 September 1939.

On 16 September 1945, the acting commander of the 4th Military District, Major General Arvid Moberg, formally presented the two colours to the newly established Göta Life Guards (P 1).

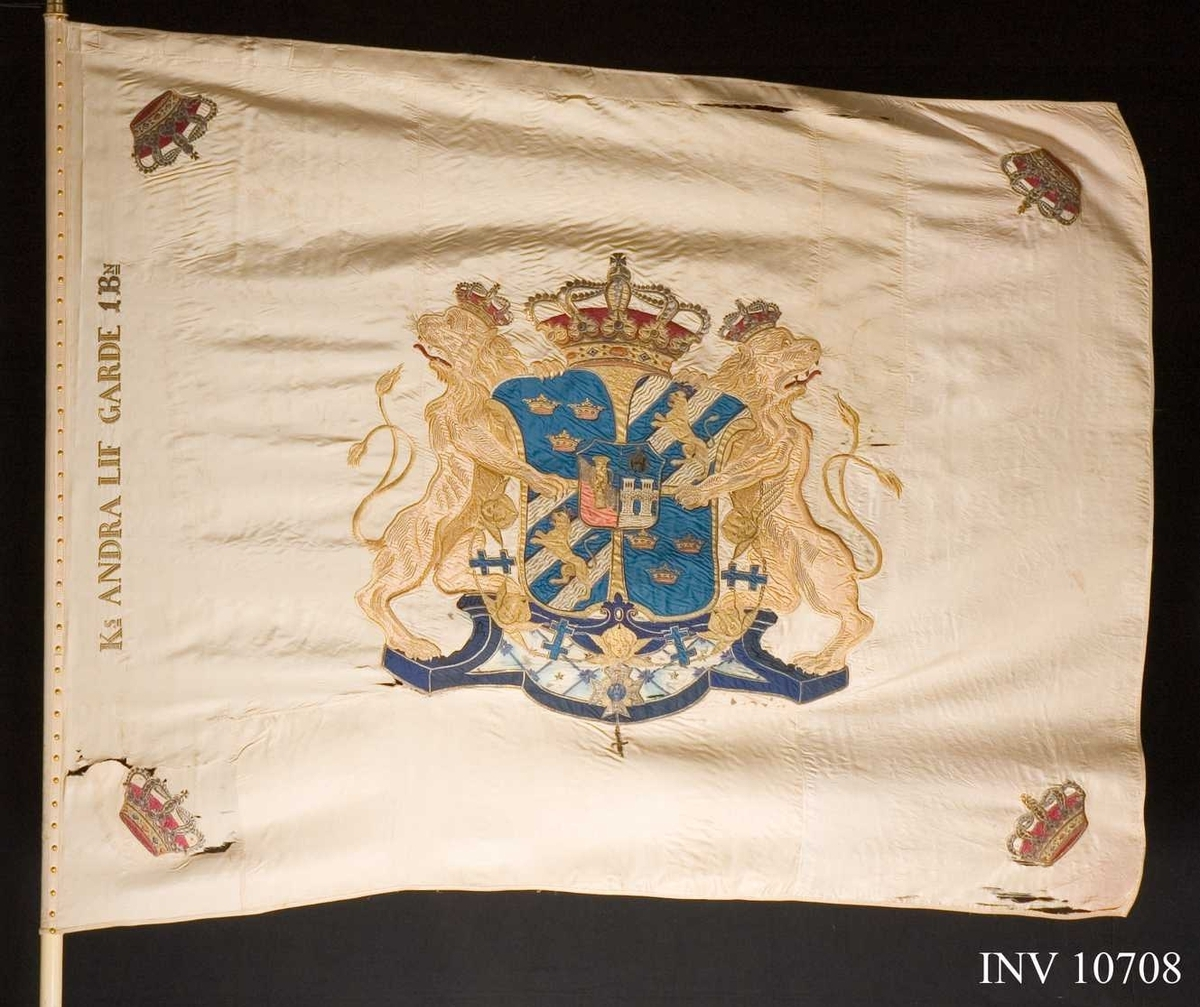
1844 company colour of the 1st Battalion

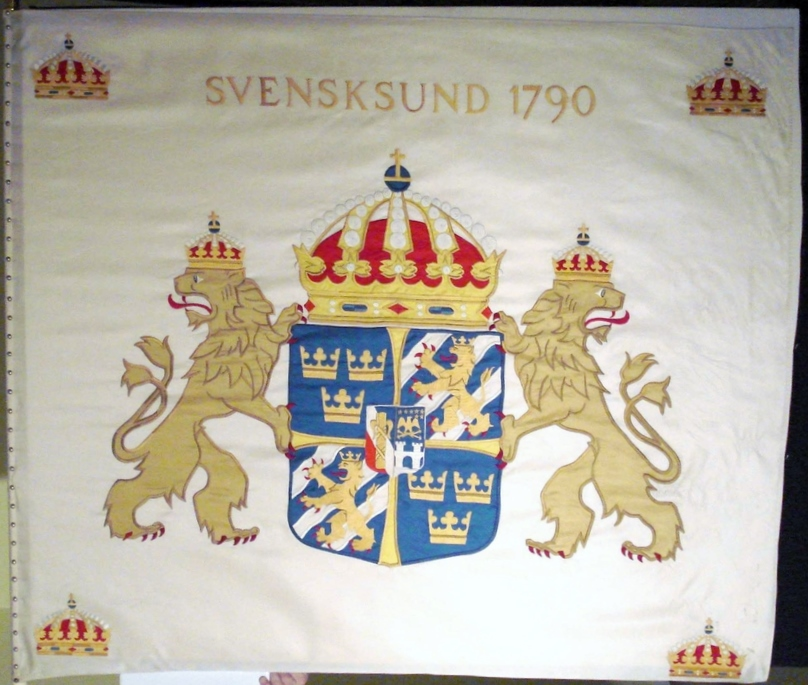
1872 colour of the 2nd Battalion

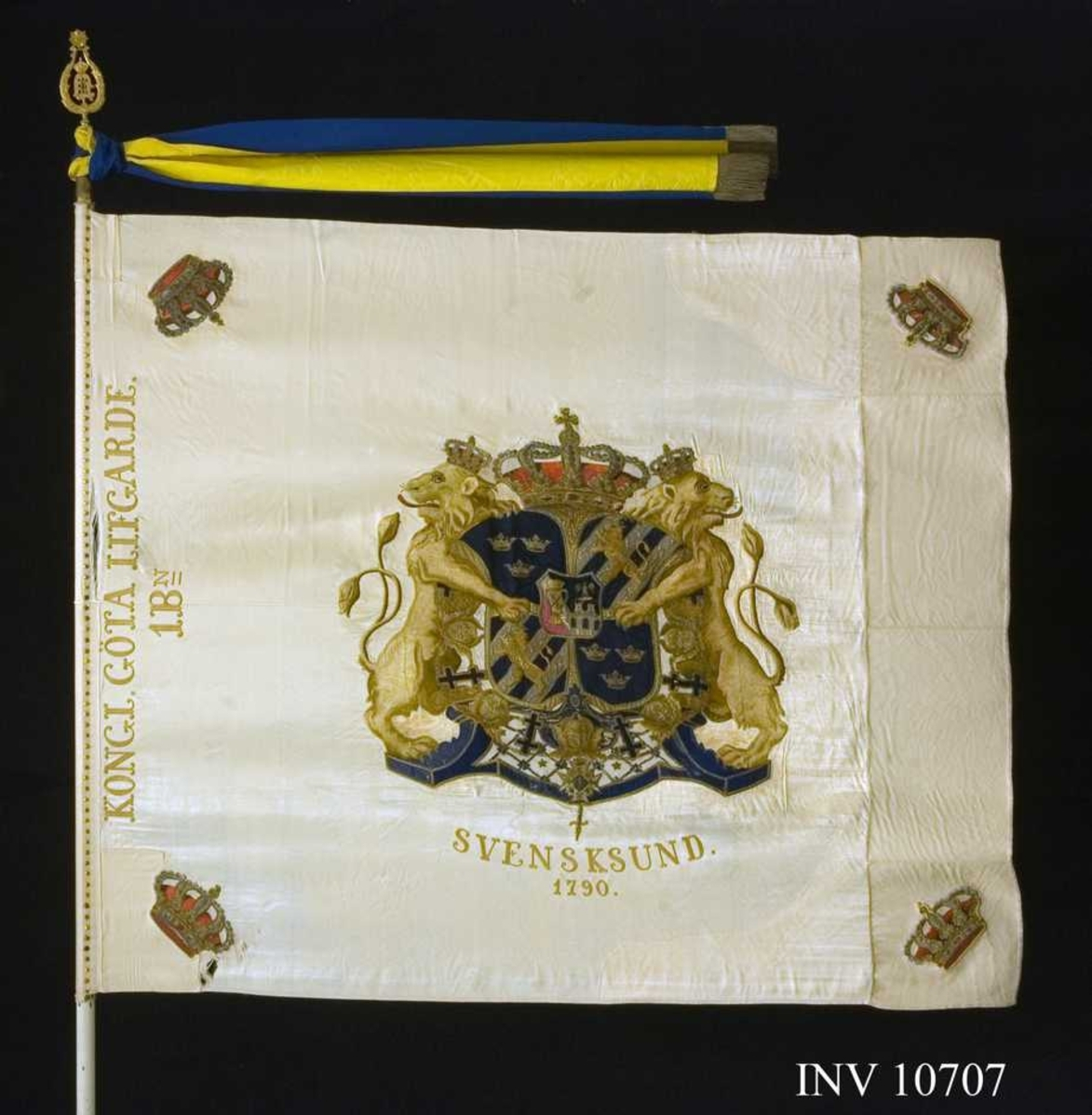
1894 company colour of the 1st Battalion

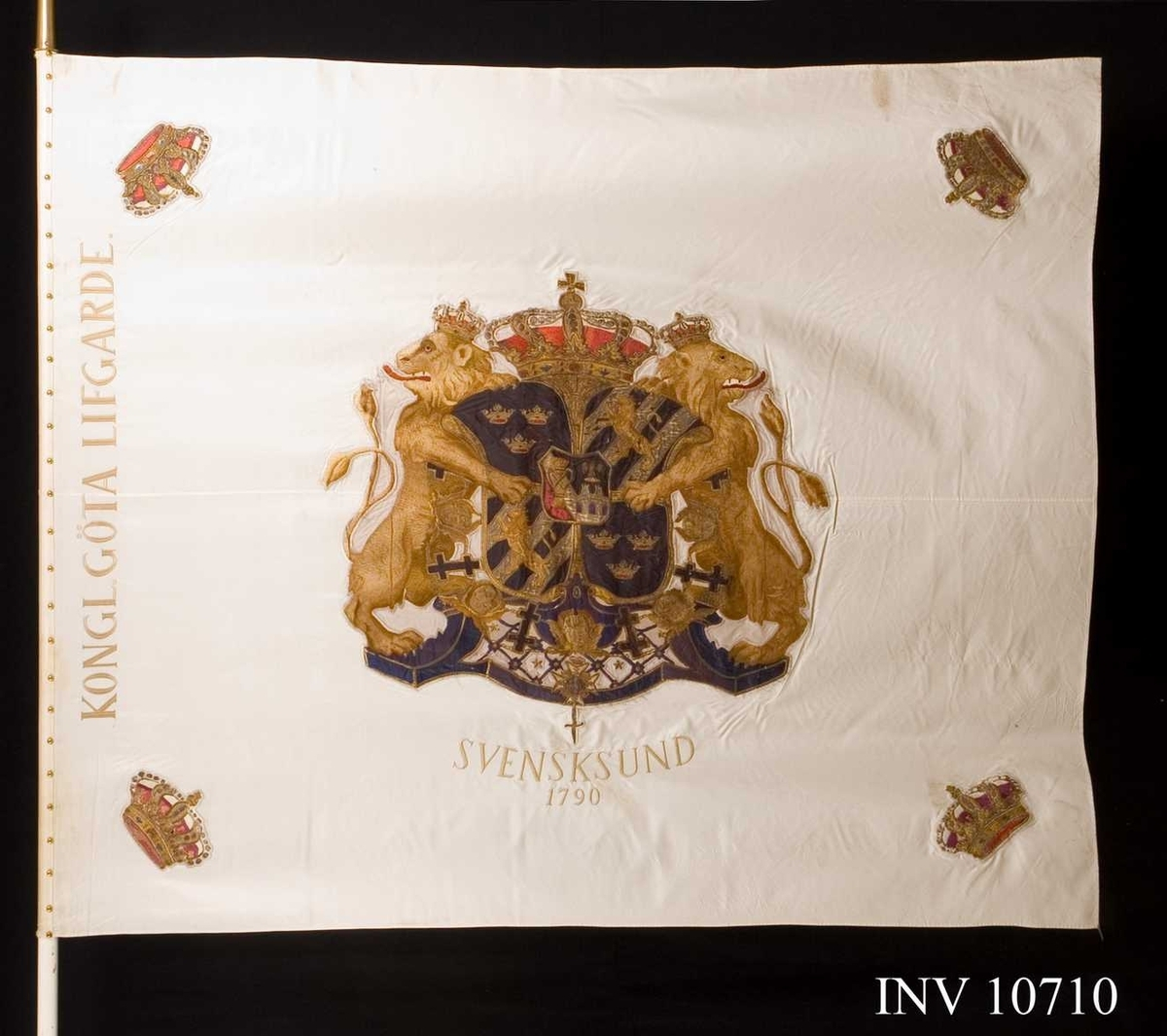
1894 colour of the 2nd Battalion

=== Memorial stones ===
In memory of the Göta Life Guards, three memorial stones have been erected. One memorial stone in Stockholm, located north of Linnéparken, was unveiled on 31 March 1940. Another was unveiled on Rindö on 25 September 1939 to commemorate the fortress battalion. A third memorial stone in Borgå was presented by the regiment to the city of Borgå on 6 June 1939.

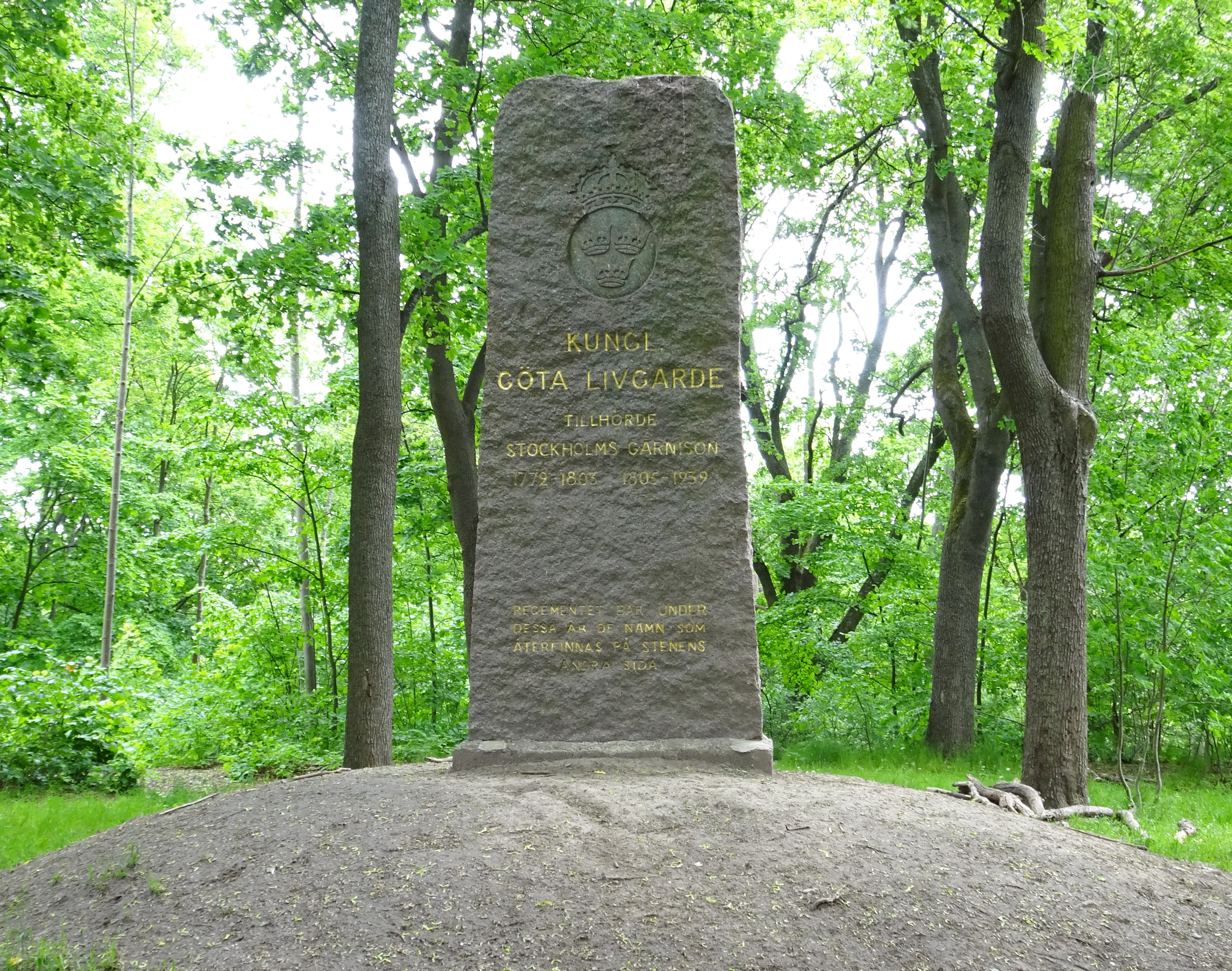
The memorial commemorates the Göta Life Guards' time at Linnégatan 89 during the years 1890–1939 (front side).

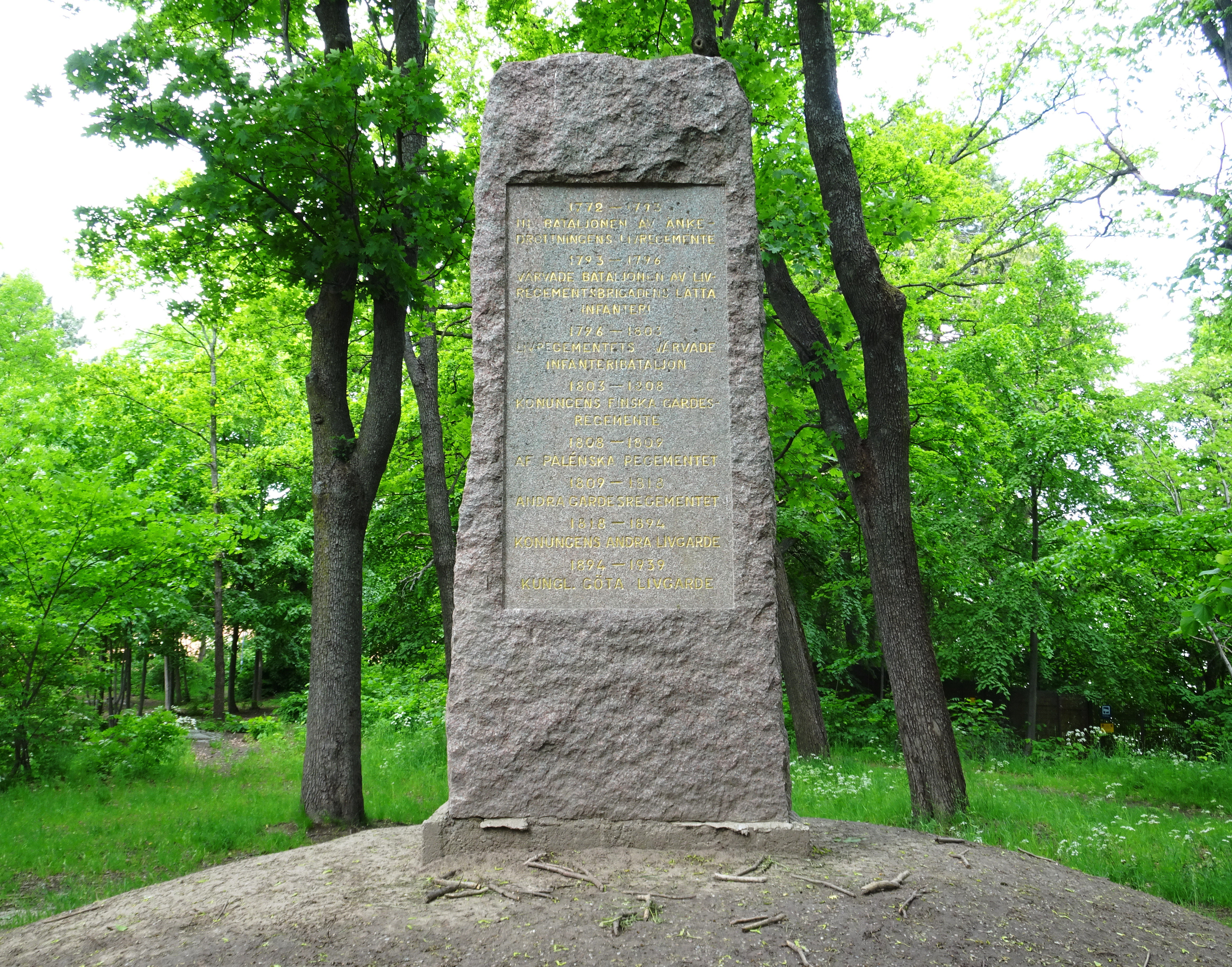
The memorial commemorates the Göta Life Guards’ time at Linnégatan 89 during the years 1890–1939 (reverse side).

=== Sculpture ===
The regiment's most striking traditional object is the so-called "lion group"—a wooden sculpture created by Carl Ahlborn for the Second Life Guards' barracks on Grev Magnigatan in Stockholm. The lion group was later moved to the barracks on Linnégatan, where it was placed in the gymnasium. It was subsequently relocated to Enköping, where it was mounted above the entrance to the regiment. Since 1971, it has been displayed inside the dining hall at the barracks facility in Enköping.

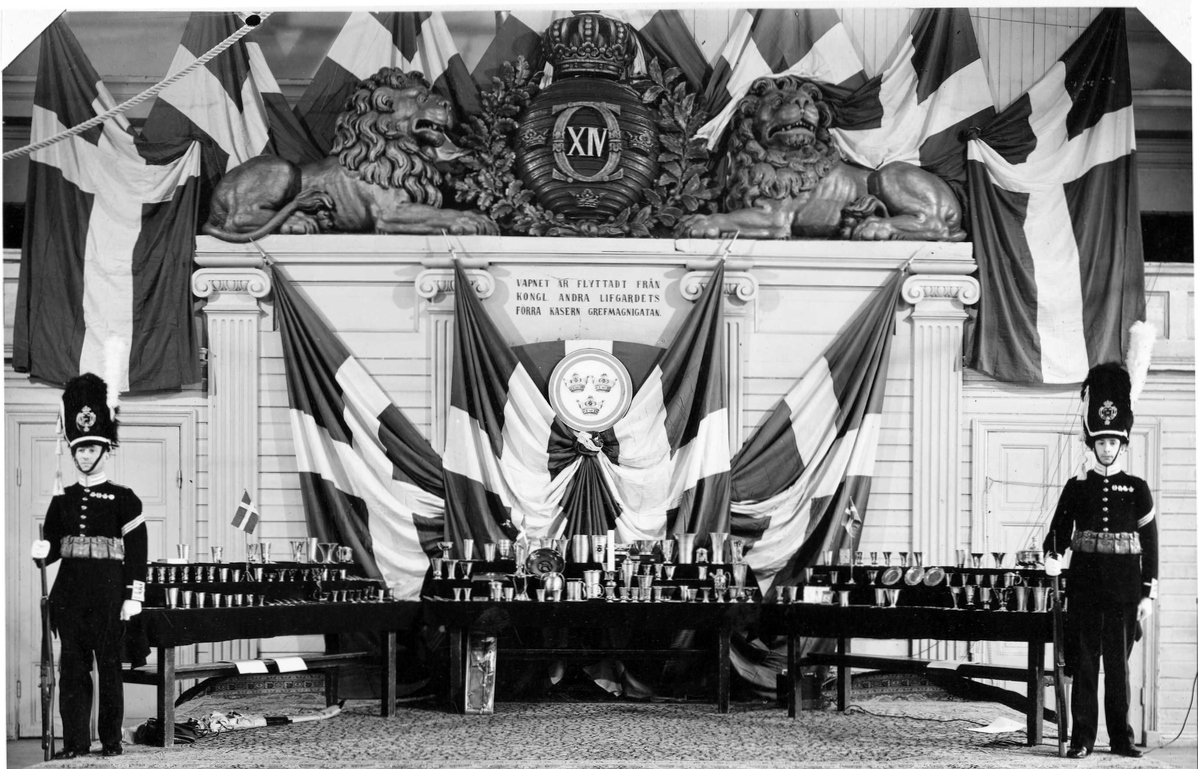
Regimental lion group

== Commanding officers ==
The regiment was divided into a regimental staff, a reduced infantry battalion in Vaxholm, a tank battalion, and an independent company. Below are the commanders who served in each unit from 1901 to 1939. The title Sekundchef (second-in-command) was used until 1975 for regiments that were part of the Royal Majesty's Life and Household Troops.

=== Seconds-in-command ===
- 1809–1809: Colonel Axel af Palén
- 1810–1817: Major General Conrad Theodor von Schulzenheim
- 1817–1851: Major General Carl Fredrik Lorichs
- 1851–1866: Major General Samuel Vilhelm Nauckhoff
- 1866–1880: Major General Sven Lagerberg
- 1880–1888: Colonel Gustaf (Gösta) Lagerberg
- 1888–1896: Major General Zacharias Rudbeck
- 1896–1901: Colonel Pehr Christian Libert Lovén
- 1901–1908: Colonel Ludvig Falkman
- 1908–1915: Colonel Constantin Fallenius
- 1915–1926: Colonel John Nauckhoff
- 1926–1934: Colonel Tage af Klercker
- 1934–1938: Colonel Folke Hellgren
- 1938–1939: Colonel Bertil Uggla
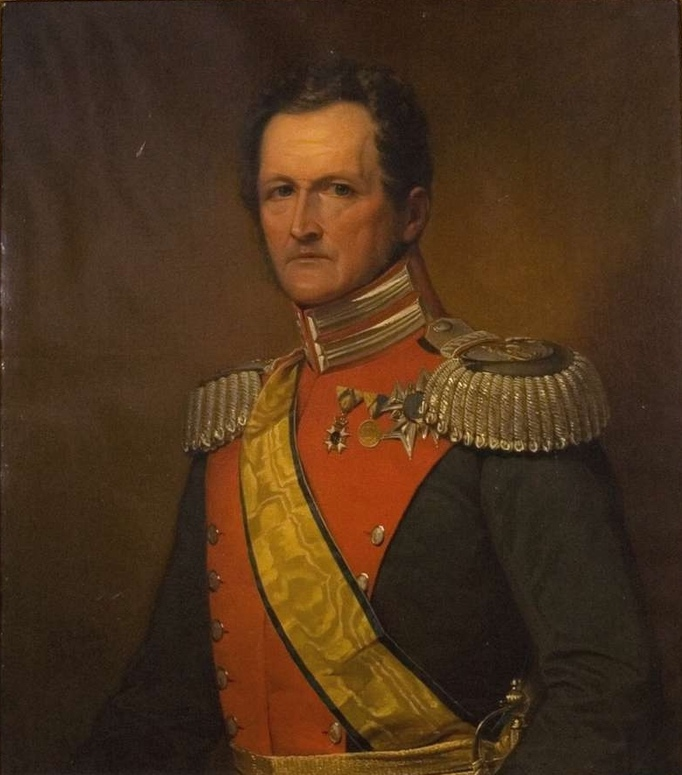
Regimental commander (1817–51), Major General Carl Fredrik Lorichs wearing the regiment's tailcoat m/1833

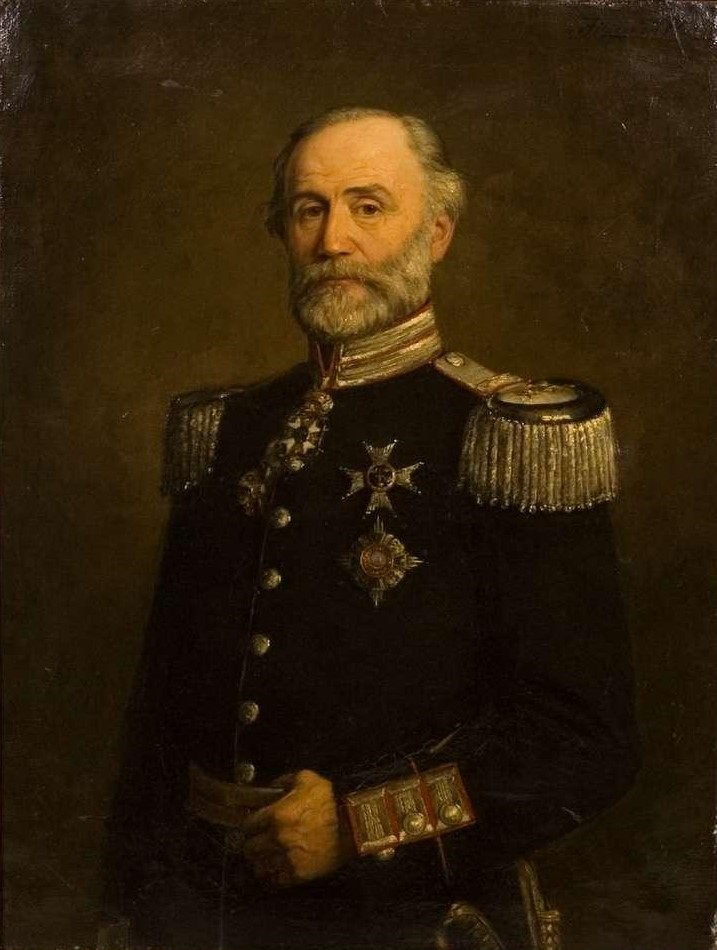
Regimental commander (1880–88), Colonel Gösta Lagerberg wearing the regiment's uniform

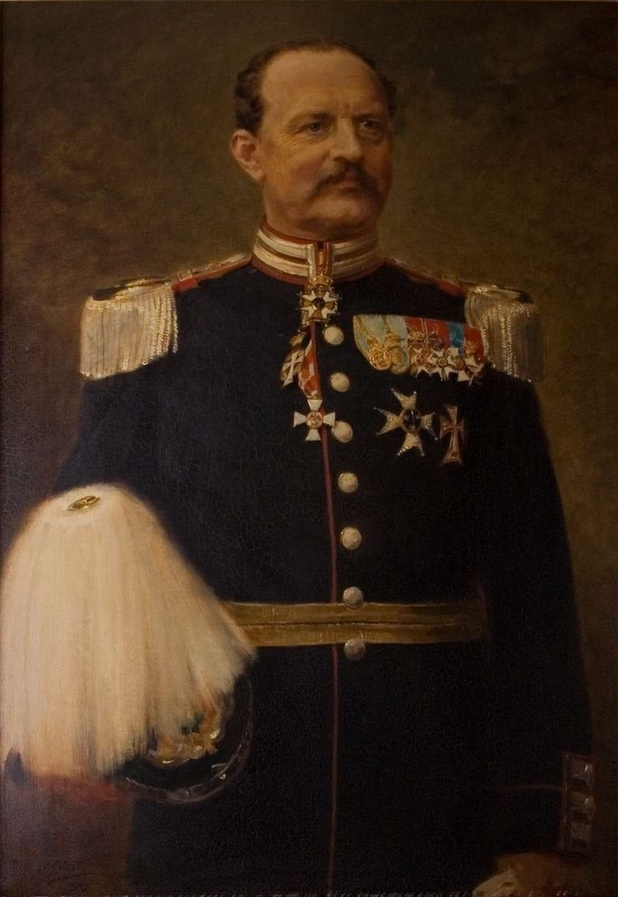
Regimental commander (1901–08), Colonel Ludvig Falkman wearing the regiment's uniform m/1886

=== Lower-ranking commanders ===
==== Commanders of the Tank Battalion ====
- 1928–1930: Colonel Bertil af Burén
- 1930–1934: Lieutenant Colonel Gösta Hahr
- 1934–1938: Lieutenant Colonel Curt Klingspor
- 1938–1939: Lieutenant Colonel Carl August Ehrensvärd

==== Commanders of the Fortress Battalion ====
- 1928–1929: Lieutenant Colonel Hjalmar Fahlström
- 1929–1933: Lieutenant Colonel Ivar Broman
- 1933–1937: Lieutenant Colonel Justus Holmgren
- 1937–1939: Lieutenant Colonel Eric Grill

==== Commanders of the Garrison Company ====
- 1928–1936: Captain Anders Daevel
- 1936–1939: Captain Folke Fleetwood

== Names, designations and locations ==
Name	Translation	From		To
Kunglig Majestäts andra gardesregemente	His Majesty's Second Guard Regiment	1809-04-14	–	1818
Konungens Andra livgarde	King's Second Life Guards	1818	–	1894-08-05
Kungliga Göta livgarde	Royal Göta Life Guards	1894-08-06	–	1939-09-30
Avvecklingsorganisation	Decommissioning Organisation	1939-10-01	–	1940-03-31
Designation		From		To
No 2		1816-03-26	–	1914-09-30
I 2		1914-10-01	–	1939-09-30
I 2 S		1928-01-01	–	1939-09-30
I 2 V		1928-01-01	–	1939-09-30
Location		From		To
Stockholm Garrison		1943-08-12	–	1944-01-17

== See also ==
- Göta Life Guards (P 1)
- List of Swedish infantry regiments
