= Hagrup Haukland =

Norwegian army officer

Hagrup Johan Halgrim Haukland (3 January 1941 - 20 May 2024) was a retired Norwegian army officer. In 1995 he was a sector commander for the United Nations Protection Force (UNPROFOR) in Bosnia heading 6,000 multinational troops including the 400 soldiers who witnessed the Srebrenica Massacre. After his military career he headed the Sri Lanka Monitoring Mission.

== Aiding escapees in Lebanon ==
Haukland served as battalion commander with the United Nations Interim Force in Lebanon (UNIFIL) from May 1992 to May 1993. In September 1992 he aided two men who had escaped from the Khiam detention center in Lebanon where Haukland believed torture took place. The escapees were transported out of southern Lebanon in a UN-marked armoured personnel carrier and dressed in Norwegian military uniforms with UNIFIL insignia. The UN convoy passed through checkpoints set up by Israeli forces.

== Srebrenica massacre ==
Brigadier General Haukland was commander of UNPROFOR's Sector North East in Bosnia when the Srebrenica Massacre took place in July 1995.

When the massacre started Haukland was on vacation, which had been postponed several times to deal with events in the United Nations Safe Areas that he was responsible for. His deputy Colonel Charles Brantz phoned Haukland twice on 9 July 1995 to inform him of the growing crisis in Srebrenica. Haukland returned from vacation to his headquarters in Tuzla on July 14.

In a 2005 article in the Norwegian newspaper Ny Tid an unnamed officer who served on Haukland's multinational staff at Tuzla in 1995 cast doubt on the claim by Haukland and Norway's Chief of Defence Arne Solli that the attack on Srebrenica was a surprise. The article reported the anonymous officer as stating "We knew early that the Serbs were amassing (or positioning and increasing) their forces around Srebrenica. At the end of June Haukland informed headquarters in Sarajevo again and again of this".

A 2006 article in Ny Tid says that "Haukland regularly informed Chief of Defence Arne Sollie about conditions in Haukland's sector. When Haukland departed Bosnia on his vacation to Norway, he travelled on the same airplane as the defence minister".

A 2002 report by Netherlands Institute for War Documentation entitled Srebrenica: a ‘safe’ area did not apportion any blame for the massacre to Haukland.

In 2005 Haukland said that he would welcome investigation of his role "in the handling of events related to the massacre".

== See also ==
- Srebrenica Massacre
