= Göta Life Guards (armoured) =

Swedish armoured regiment

- Göta livgarde
- Active: 1944–1980
- Country: Sweden
- Branch: Swedish Army
- Part of: Eastern Military District
- Headquarters: Enköping Garrison
- Colors: Red
- March: "Göta livgardes marsch" (Note: By Schubert. The march was adopted in 1944 and established in 1953 by Army Order 33/1953. The march was used by the Eastern Army Division from 1993 to 2000.)
- Battle honours: Svensksund (1790)

Insignia
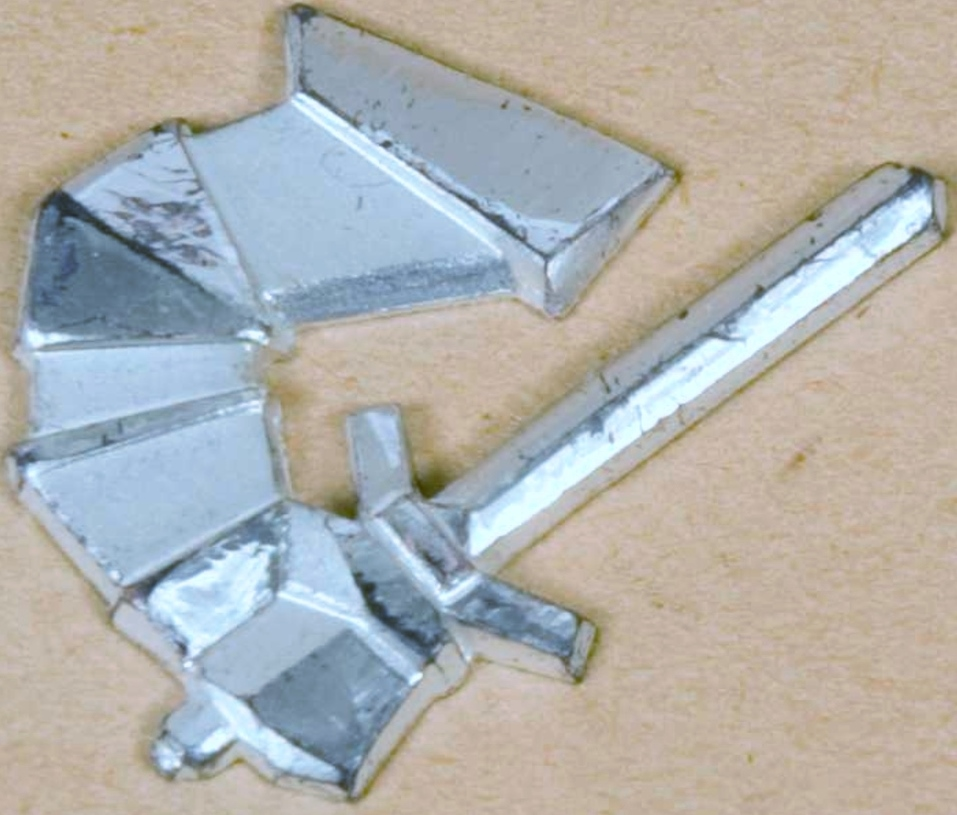
- Branch insignia

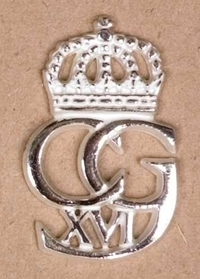
- Unit insignia

The Göta Life Guards (Swedish: Göta livgarde), designated P 1, was a Swedish Army armoured regiment that was active in various forms 1944–1980. The unit was based in the Enköping Garrison in Enköping and belonged to the King's Life and Household Troops (Kungl. Maj:ts Liv- och Hustrupper) until 1974.

== Units ==
=== Blue Brigade ===
The Blue Brigade (PB 6) was raised in 1949 and was organized following the Pansarbrigad 49 ("Armoured Brigade 49") unit type. According to the Defence Act of 1972, the brigade was disbanded on 30 June 1980.

In connection with the Defence Act of 1942, infantry regiments came to be raised as "field regiments" and "duplication regiments". The Svea Life Guards raised the war-time units Svea Life Guards (I 1) and Stockholm Infantry Regiment (Stockholms infanteriregemente, I 31). After the Defence Act of 1948, brigades throughout the entire army were introduced, which led the army to be renamed into two brigade types, infantry brigades and armoured brigades. Stockholm Infantry Regiment (I 31) was reorganized and was responsible for the armoured part of the Blue Brigade (PB 6) and the Södermanland Brigade (PB 10).

=== Swedish Armoured Troops Cadet and Officer Candidate School ===
The Swedish Armoured Troops Cadet and Officer Candidate School (PKAS) was co-localized with the regiment. However, the school was directly subordinate to the Inspector of the Swedish Armoured Troops, but was commanded in a barracks point of view by the regiment's executive officer. The school was tasked with training officer candidates from all units within the Swedish Armoured Troops. These underwent two-stage training, first candidate school and second candidate school, then completed their education at the Military Academy Karlberg in Solna. The school was placed in Enköping on 3 April 1946, and was transferred to the barracks of the Life company. On 1 March 1967, the school was able to move into a newly built school building within the barracks area. The Life company thus returned to being a school company at the Göta Life Guards. Although Göta Life Guards was not provided with the Stridsvagn 103, training on it was still conducted at the school. This was because the school was provided with all types of combat vehicles within the armoured branch. When the regiment was disbanded, the school came to be relocated to Skövde on 1 June 1980, where it was amalgamated with the Swedish Armoured Troops School (PS), who adopted the new name, the Swedish Armoured Troops Combat School (Pansartruppernas stridsskola, PS).

=== Training companies ===
The regiment trained eight companies of tank crews, of which there were two tank destroyer platoons (with Infanterikanonvagn 102 and Infanterikanonvagn 103), a signal company and an assault pioneer company. Future platoon leaders were trained at the 3rd Company, which was a student company. Furthermore, PKAS trained four companies.

- Life company – command training company, tank and mechanized infantry
- 2nd Company – tross company
- 3rd Company – command training company, assault gun och mechanized infantry
- 4th Company – tank company
- 5th Company – reconnaissance company
- 6th Company – mechanized infantry company
- 7th Company – signal company
- 8th Company – depot company

== Barracks and training areas ==
=== Barracks ===
When the regiment was re-raised, its staff was placed to Karlavägen 78 and later to Linnégatan 89 in Stockholm. On 18 January 1944, the staff was relocated to Enköping, where it was placed in temporary premises. On 15 September 1945, the regiment officially moved to the newly built barracks area in Enköping which was celebrated by a ceremony on 16 September 1945.

=== Detachments ===
==== Strängnäs/Skövde ====
When the regiment was re-raised, training of conscripts was conducted at Södermanland Regiment (P 3) in Strängnäs Garnison from 18 January 1944, and at Skaraborg Regiment (P 4) in Skövde Garrison. On 15 September 1945, these detachments were disbanded when the training was transferred to Enköping.

==== Visby ====
On 1 October 1944, the regiment placed a company to Gotland, which became known as Göta Armoured Life Guards' Company in Gotland (P 1 G). The detachment was placed in the barracks at Gotland Infantry Regiment (I 18). From 1946, the detachment moved into the newly built barracks, Barracks IV (from the 1960s known as the barracks Havde), at Gotland Infantry Regiment. On 30 March 1963, the detachment was disbanded and on 1 April 1963 it was amalgamated with Gotland Regiment (P 18).

=== Training areas ===
From 1944 the regiment began training at Utö proving ground, and from 1945 the regiment's proving ground was supplemented with the Veckholm proving ground. The detachment on Gotland was using Hällarna in Visby and Tofta proving ground.

== Heraldry and traditions ==
=== Colours, standards and guidons ===
On 16 September 1945, the regiment was presented with two colour by the acting military commander of the IV Military District, major general Arvid Moberg. The colours had previously been presented by the 1st and 2nd Battalions of Göta Life Guards (I 2), who received the colours by His Majesty the King Oscar II on 6 August 1894. The colours themselves had been paid personally by Oscar II, and were presented by the regiment until it was disbanded in 1939. In 1972, a new colour was presented, which was handed over on 11 May 1974 by His Majesty the King Carl XVI Gustaf. The new colour replaced the two previous ones. At the disbandment of the regiment in 1980, the colour was handed over to the Swedish Army Museum.

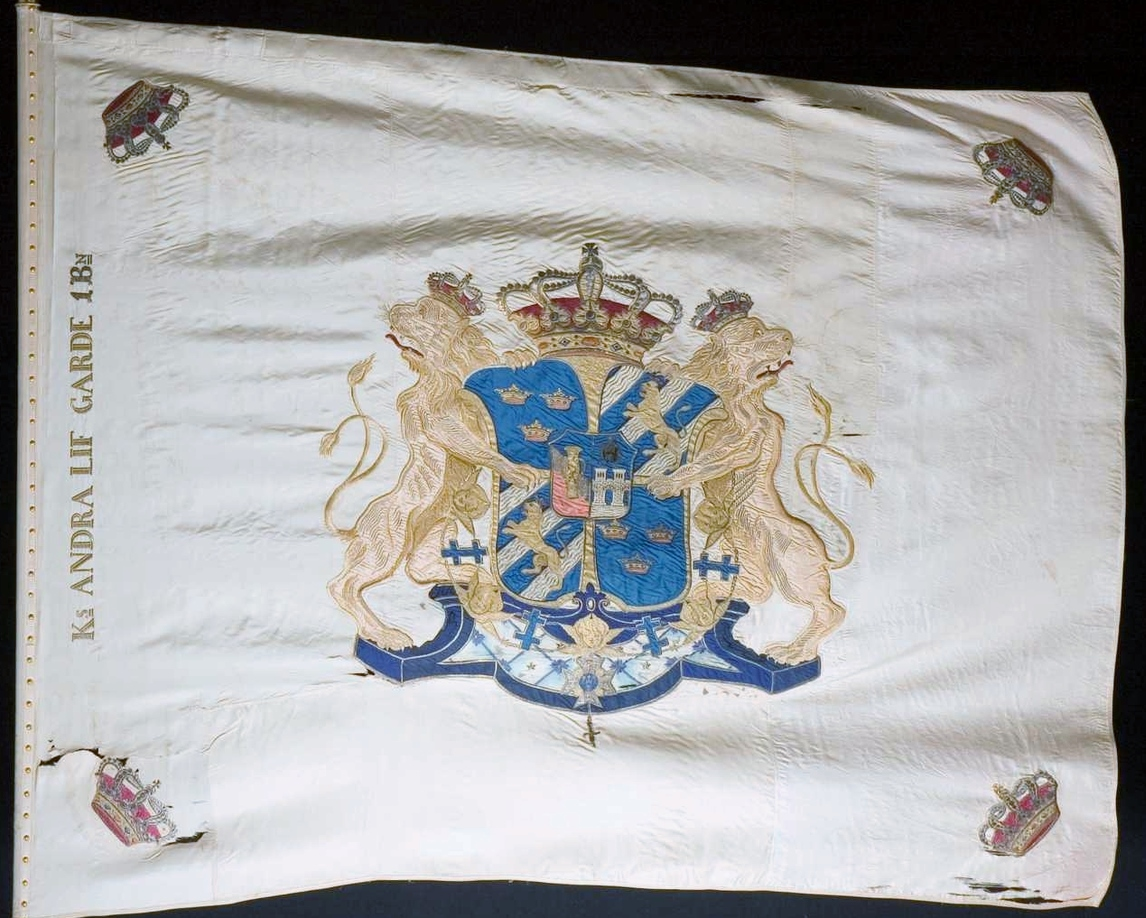
The 1844 colour of Göta Life Guards' 1st Battalion.

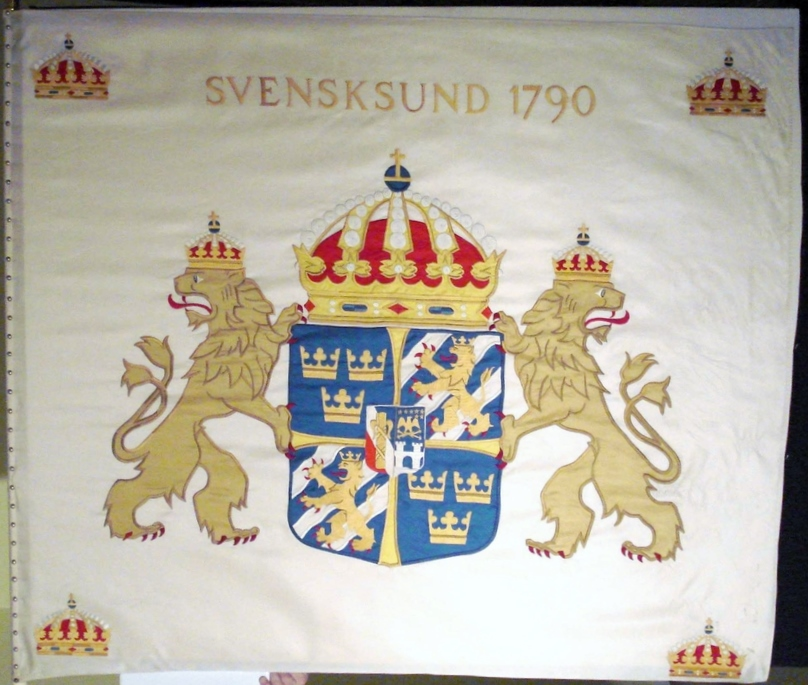
The 1945 colour of Göta Life Guards' 2nd Battalion.

=== Uniforms ===
The regiment differed in clothing compared to other armoured units, wearing black beret for uniform m/60. The Göta Life Guards instead carried side cap with red collar to uniform m/60. Buttons, branch insignias and rank insignia were in silver. On peaked caps rank insignias in silver was worn and with collar in silver. That the regiment's insignias was in silver, was to mark that it was a guards unit.

Unit insignia M7675-138000 m/1950-60 for Göta Life Guards (P 1).

Unit insignia M7675-138000 m/1950-60 for Göta Life Guards (P 1).

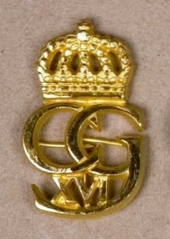
Unit insignia m/1960.

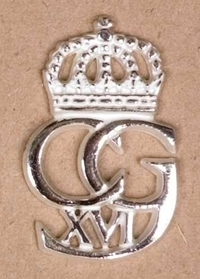
Unit insignia m/1960.

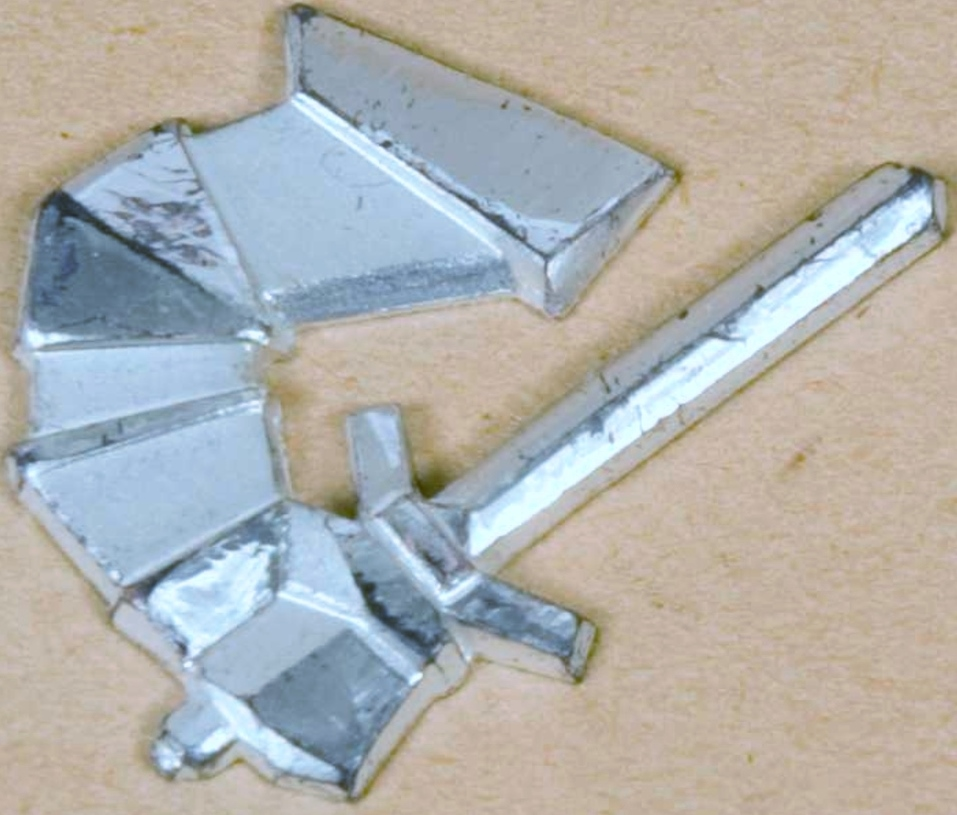
Branch insignia m/1963. Only used for Göta Life Guards (P 1).

=== Coat of arms ===
The coat of the arms of the Göta Life Guards (P 1) 1977–1980. Blazon: "Azure, the lesser coat of arms of Sweden, three open crowns or. The shield surmounted two arms in fess, embowed and vambraced, the hands holding swords in saltire, argent".

=== Heritage ===
When the regiment was disbanded, the Chief of the Army, Lieutenant General Nils Sköld decided, on the recommendation of executive officer Sven Björck, that no other unit or regiment would carry on the traditions of the Göta Life Guards but that the memory of the regiment should be preserved at Uppland Regiment (S 1/Fo 47/48). Since 1 January 2006, this memory has been passed on to the Command and Control Regiment.

== Commanding officers ==
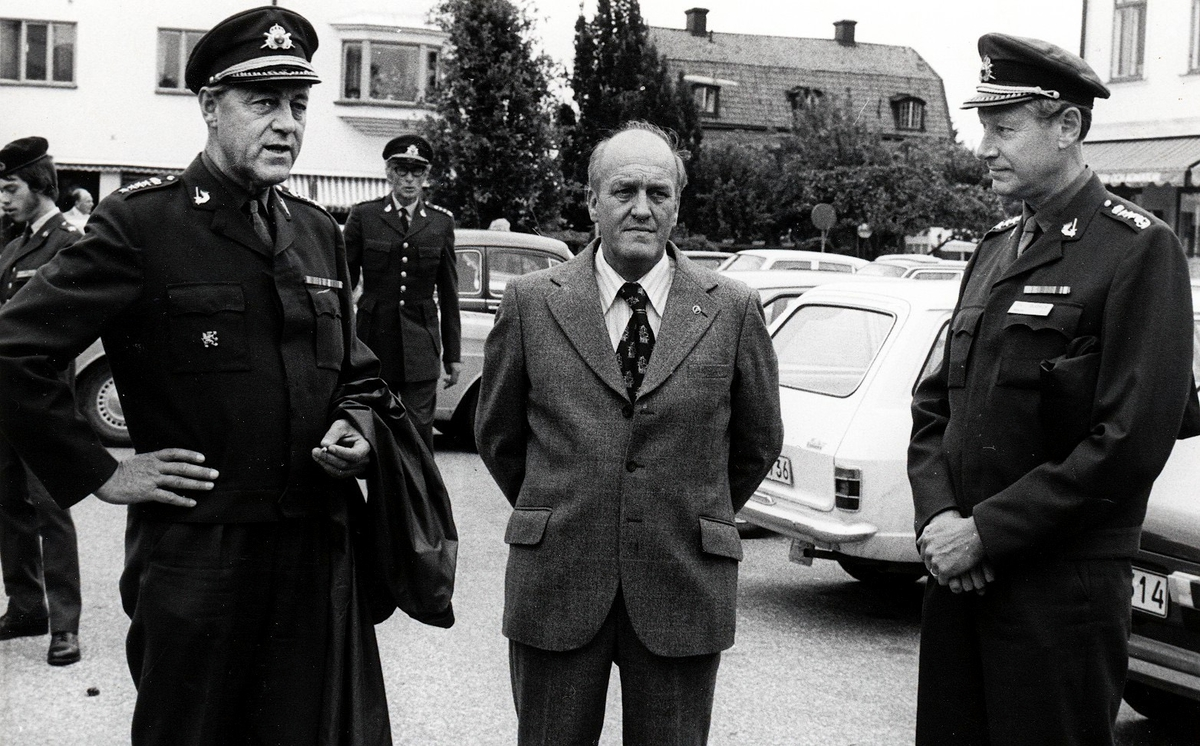
P 1's last commander, Colonel Sven Björck (right) in 1977, together with the commander of P 10, Senior Colonel Nils Stenqvist (left).

Regimental commanders and executive officers (Sekundchef) active at the regiment. Sekundchef was a title which was used until 31 December 1974 at the regiments that were part of the King's Life and Household Troops (Kungl. Maj:ts Liv- och Hustrupper).

=== Regimental commanders ===
- 1944–1950: Gustaf V
- 1950–1973: Gustaf VI Adolf
- 1973–1974: Carl XVI Gustaf
- 1975–1980: Sven G:son Björck

=== Executive officers ===
- 1944–1951: Nils Gustaf D:son Aschan
- 1951–1955: Fale Burman
- 1955–1966: Åke Wikland
- 1966–1973: Nils Östlund
- 1973–1974: Sven G:son Björck

== Names, designations and locations ==
Name	Translation	From		To
Kungl. Göta pansarlivgarde	Royal Göta Armoured Life Guards; Royal Göta Armour Guards Regiment	1944-04-01	–	1963-03-31
Kungl. Göta livgarde	Royal Göta Life Guards	1963-04-01	–	1974-12-31
Göta livgarde	Göta Life Guards	1975-01-01	–	1980-06-30
Designation		From		To
P 1		1944-04-01	–	1980-06-30
Location		From		To
Stockholm Garrison		1943-08-12	–	1944-01-17
Enköping Garrison		1944-01-18	–	1980-06-30

== See also ==
- List of Swedish armoured regiments
