= Södermanland Regiment (armoured) =

Coordinates: 59°23′10″N 17°00′24″E

- Södermanlands regemente
- Active: 1942–1957, 1963–2004
- Country: Sweden
- Allegiance: Swedish Armed Forces
- Branch: Swedish Army
- Type: Armoured
- Size: Regiment
- Part of: IV. Milo (1942–1957, 1963–1966); Milo Ö (1966–1991); Milo M (1991–2000); OPIL (2000–2004)
- Garrison/HQ: Strängnäs
- Motto: Regimus neque hostis ("It is we who decide - not the enemy")
- Colors: Black and yellow
- March: "Södermanlands regementes marsch" (Note: The march was established in 1953 by Army Order 33/1953.)
- Anniversaries: 13 August (Note: In memory of the Battle of Stäket on 13 August 1719.)
- Battle honours: Warsaw (1656), Frederiksodde (1658), Tåget över Bält (1658), Fraustadt (1706), Helsingborg (1710), Gadebusch (1712), Stäket (1719)

Insignia
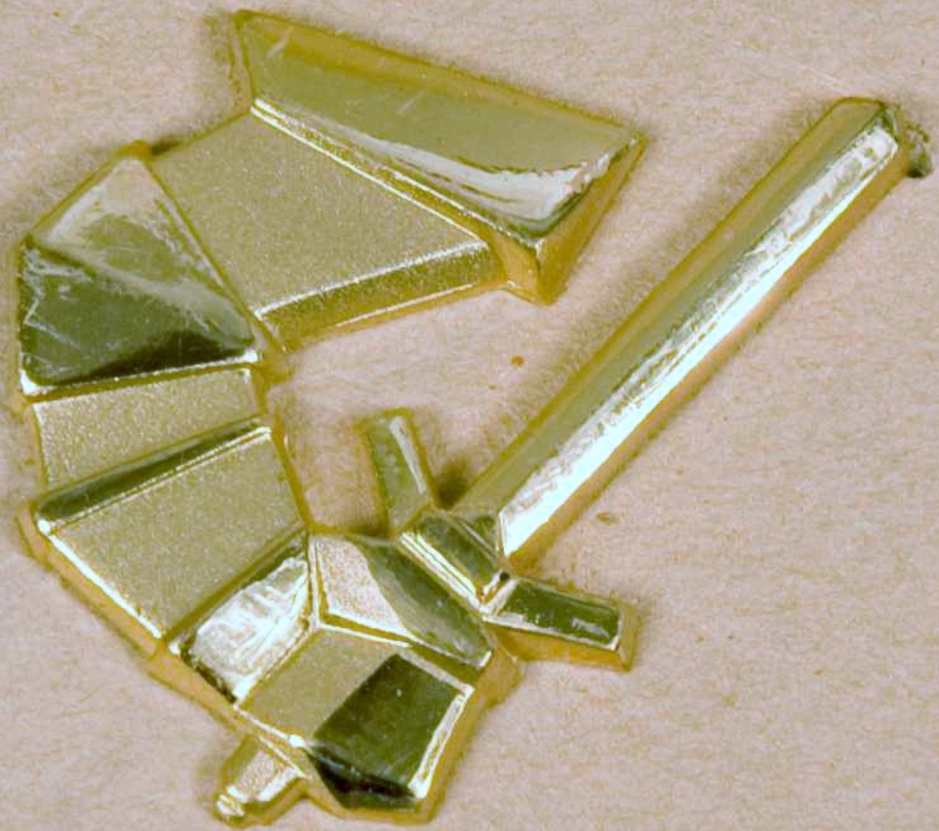
- Branch insignia

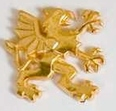
- Unit insignia

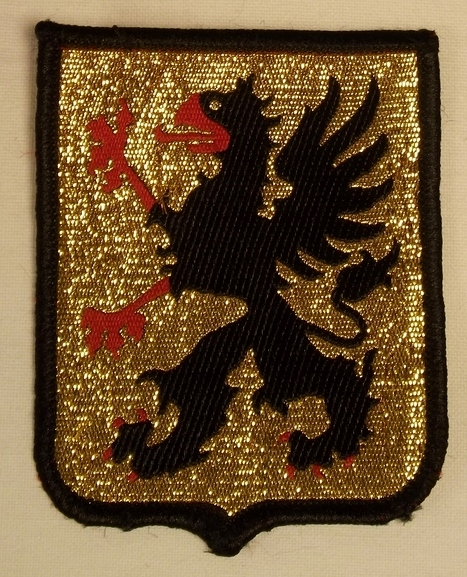
- Shoulder sleeve insignia

The Södermanland Regiment (Swedish: Södermanlands regemente), designated P 10 or P 3 and P 10/Fo 43, was an armored regiment of the Swedish Army with its roots in the 17th century, and was located in Strängnäs. The regiment was deactivated in 2004 and its assets were funneled into other parts of the military. Its life company was transferred to the Södermanland Group of the Home Guard, making the Södermanland Group the only Home Guard unit with such a company.

== History ==
The regiment was converted from an infantry regiment to an armored regiment in 1942. With the formation of the Armoured Troops in 1942, the organization of armored brigades was started in Sweden and on 1 July 1943, Sweden's first armored brigade, the 10th Armored Brigade (10. pansarbrigaden, PB 10) was mainly organized by the regiment. The brigade's personnel strength was 6,400 men and it was equipped with 181 tanks (mainly Stridsvagn m/41 and Stridsvagn m/42). When Uppland Regiment (I 8) was disbanded in 1957 and the command there transferred to Strängnäs (the so-called Mälarkarusellen), the regiment regained its old designation I 10. The regiment now together with Göta Life Guards (P 1) was responsible for training two armored brigades PB 6 and PB 10 and I 10 in that case for the armored infantry sections and P 1 for the tank section. PB 10 was gradually equipped during this period with Stridsvagn 74. In 1963, the next reorganization took place when the regiment was returned to the Armored Troops under the name Södermanland Regiment (P 10).

The regiment received the responsibility for both the tank and the armored infantry sections of the brigade, with the KP-bil being replaced by Pansarbandvagn 301 for transporting the armored infantry. The regiment was now called P 10. Towards the end of the 1960s, Pbv 301 was replaced by Pbv 302 and Stridsvagn 74 by Stridsvagn 102. Towards the end of the 1960s, Pansarbandvagn 301 was replaced by Pansarbandvagn 302 and Stridsvagn 74 by Stridsvagn 102. Another reorganization would be carried out. In 1973, the regiment and the defence district staff were merged - the designation now became P 10/Fo 43. In connection with the disbandment of Göta Life Guards (P 1) in 1980, parts of PB 6 were transferred to PB 10 and after attempts at the regiment a new brigade type, the mechanized brigade, was created. The 10th Mechanized Brigade (MekB 10) or the Södermanland Brigade, as it also was called, had largely the same organizational structure as an armored brigade, but, in addition to Stridsvagn 101 and Pansarbandvagn 302, it also contained Infanterikanonvagn 91.

The regiment was dismantled in 2006. The last conscripts were introduced on 8 April 2005.

== Units ==
=== Swedish Army Music Platoon ===
Swedish Army Music Platoon was located at P 10 from 1982.

=== UN School ===
The UN School (FN-skolan) was located at the regiment from 1956 to 1984, when it was relocated to Almnäs Garrison. From 1956 to 1984, the regiment was the parent unit of the Swedish UN units, which was sent to, among others, Gaza, Congo (ONUC), Cyprus (UNFICYP) and the Middle East (UNEF and UNIFIL). Södermanland Regiment has also been for the first Bosnia mission (UNPROFOR), the first Kosovo mission (KFOR) and also the first Liberia mission (UNMIL).

=== Södermanland Brigade ===
Södermanland Brigade (PB 10) was formed in 1949 by reorganizing the 10th Armored Brigade (10. pansarbrigaden) into an Armored Brigade Type 49 (Pansarbrigad 49). The brigade was at the same time given the name Södermanland Brigade (PB 10). By the Defence Act of 1958, the brigade was reorganized into infantry and became armored again in 1963. The brigade was disbanded in 1974 and re-raised in 1982, then as a mechanized brigade. In 1994, the Södermanland Brigade was separated from the regiment and from 1 July of the same year became a cadre-organized war unit within the Middle Military District (Milo M). The brigade was disbanded on 30 June 2000 in connection with the Defence Act of 2000.

=== Södermanland Defence District ===
Södermanland Defence District (Södermanlands försvarsområde, Fo 43), originally Strängnäs Defence District (Strängnäs försvarsområde, Fo 43), was a defence district formed on 1 October 1942. In connection with the OLLI reform (OLLI-reformen) on 1 July 1973, Strängnäs Defence District was given joint staff with the Södermanland Regiment. On 1 January 1998, Södermanland Defence District (Fo 43) and Östergötland Defence District (Fo 41) came together to form Södermanland and Östergötland Defence District (Fo 43), with staff in Strängnäs. Södermanland and Östergötland Defence District was disbanded on 30 June 2000.

=== Army Vehicle School ===
Swedish Army Vehicle School (Arméns motorskola, MotorS) was formed in 1944 as an independent functional school. The school was initially located in Stockholm. In 1948 the school was relocated to Strängnäs. On 28 May 1970, the school was separated from the Södermanland Regiment, and formed an independent unit and authority. From 1 July 1986, the school was amalgamated again into Södermanland Regiment (P 10). In the summer of 1991, the school was relocated to Skövde, where, from 1 July 1991, it was amalgamated into the newly formed Swedish Army Maintenance Center (Arméns underhållscentrum, UhC).

=== Companies ===
1. Life Company
2. Vingåker Company
3. Nyköping Company
4. Oppunda Company
1. Strängnäs Company
2. Öster Rekarne Company
3. Väster Rekarne Company
4. Gripsholm Company

== Heraldry and traditions ==
=== Colours, standards and guidons ===
When the regiment was reorganized into an armored regiment in 1942, the regiment came to carry its colour from 1850. On 7 June 1958 the regiment received a new colour, which was presented to the regiment by His Majesty the King Gustaf VI Adolf. A new colour was presented to the then Södermanland Regiment (P 10/Fo 43) and the then Södermanland Brigade (MekB 10) at the regimental barracks in Strängnäs by His Majesty the King Carl XVI Gustaf on 12 August 1994. It was used only as regimental colour from 1 July 2000. The colour is drawn by Bengt Olof Kälde and embroidered by machine in insertion technique by the company Libraria. Blazon: "On yellow cloth the provincial badge of Södermanland; a black griffon segreant, armed and langued red. On a black border at the upper side of the colour, battle honours in yellow."

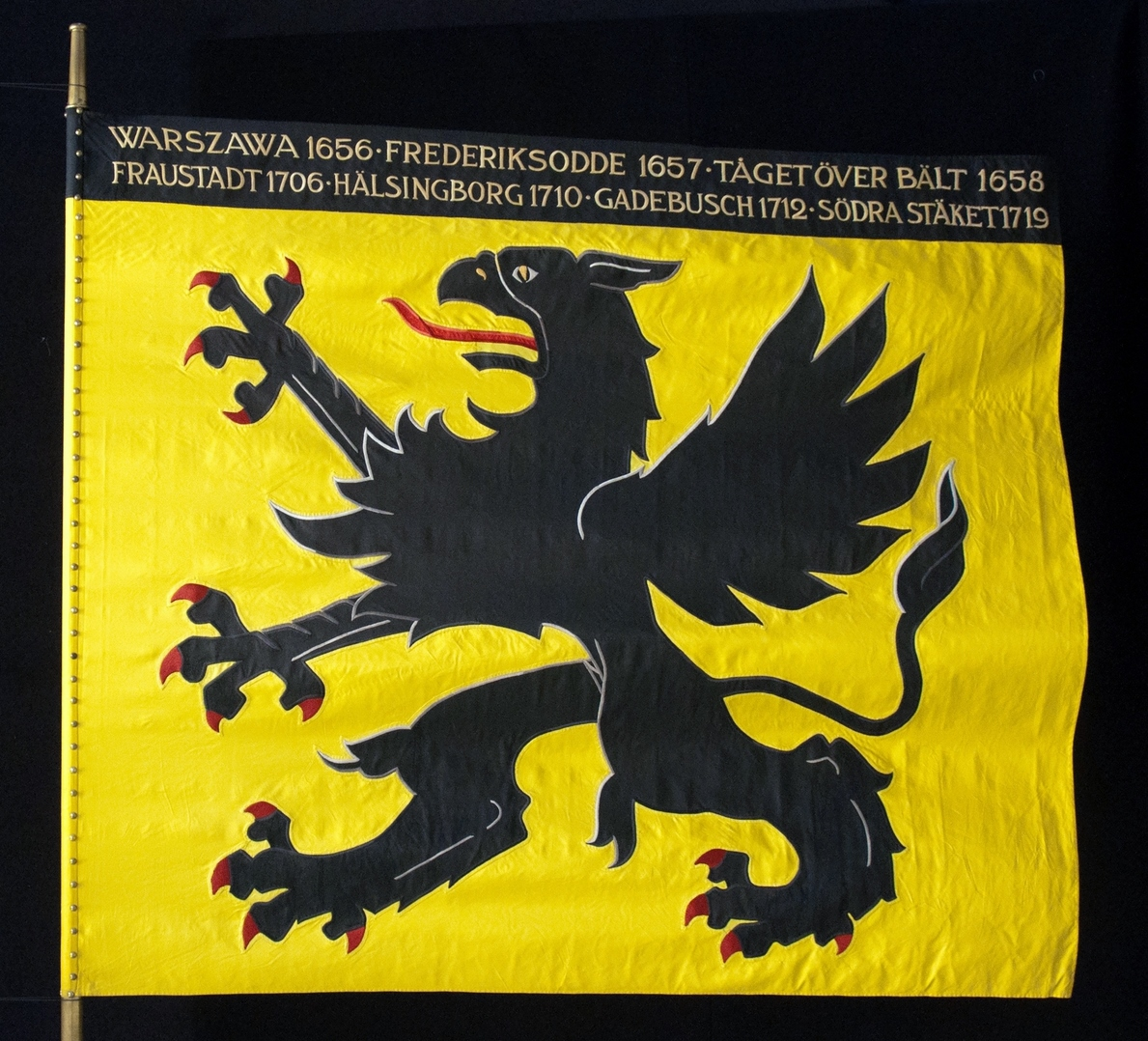
1956 regimental colour.

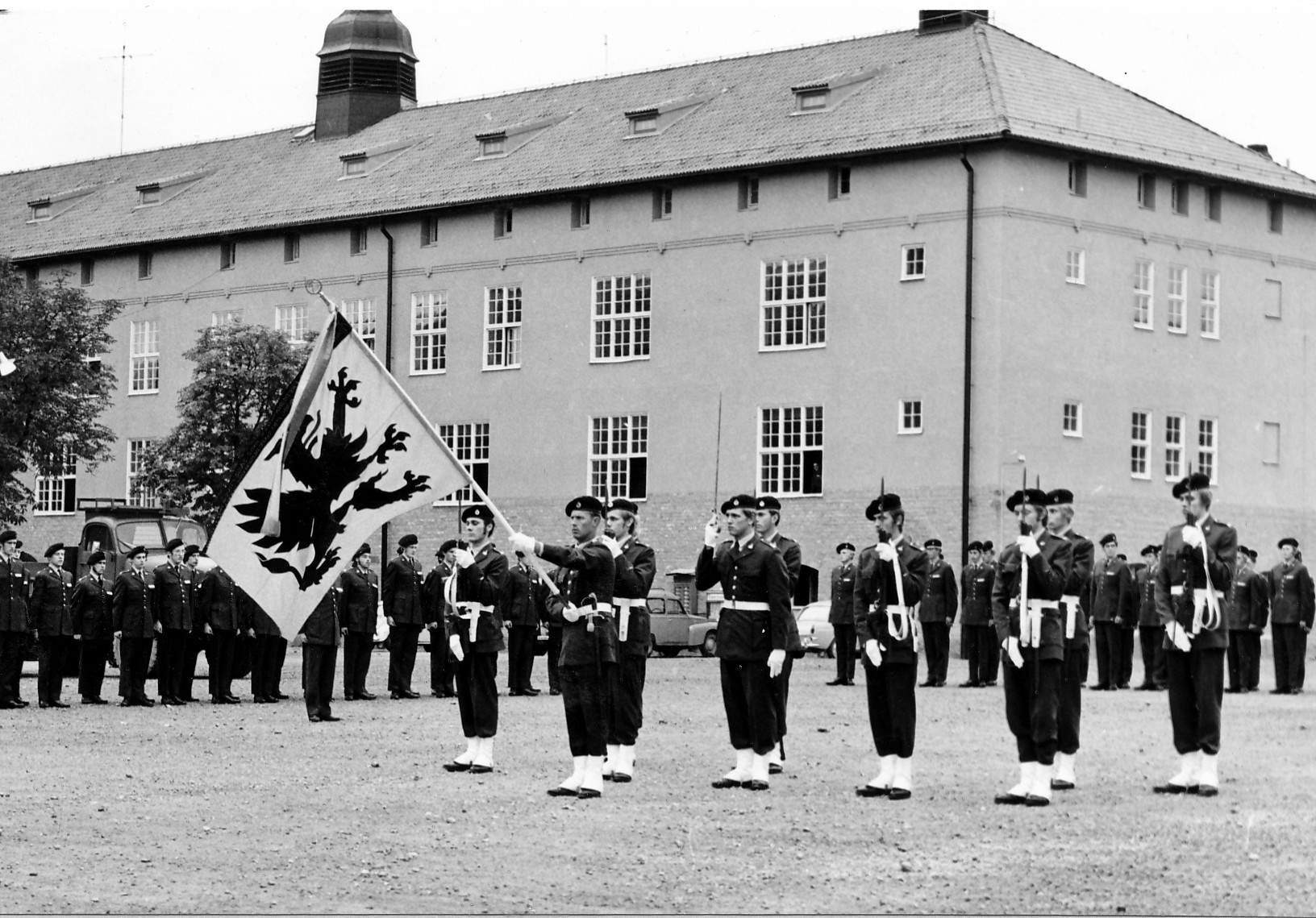
Colour guard of P 10 in 1970.

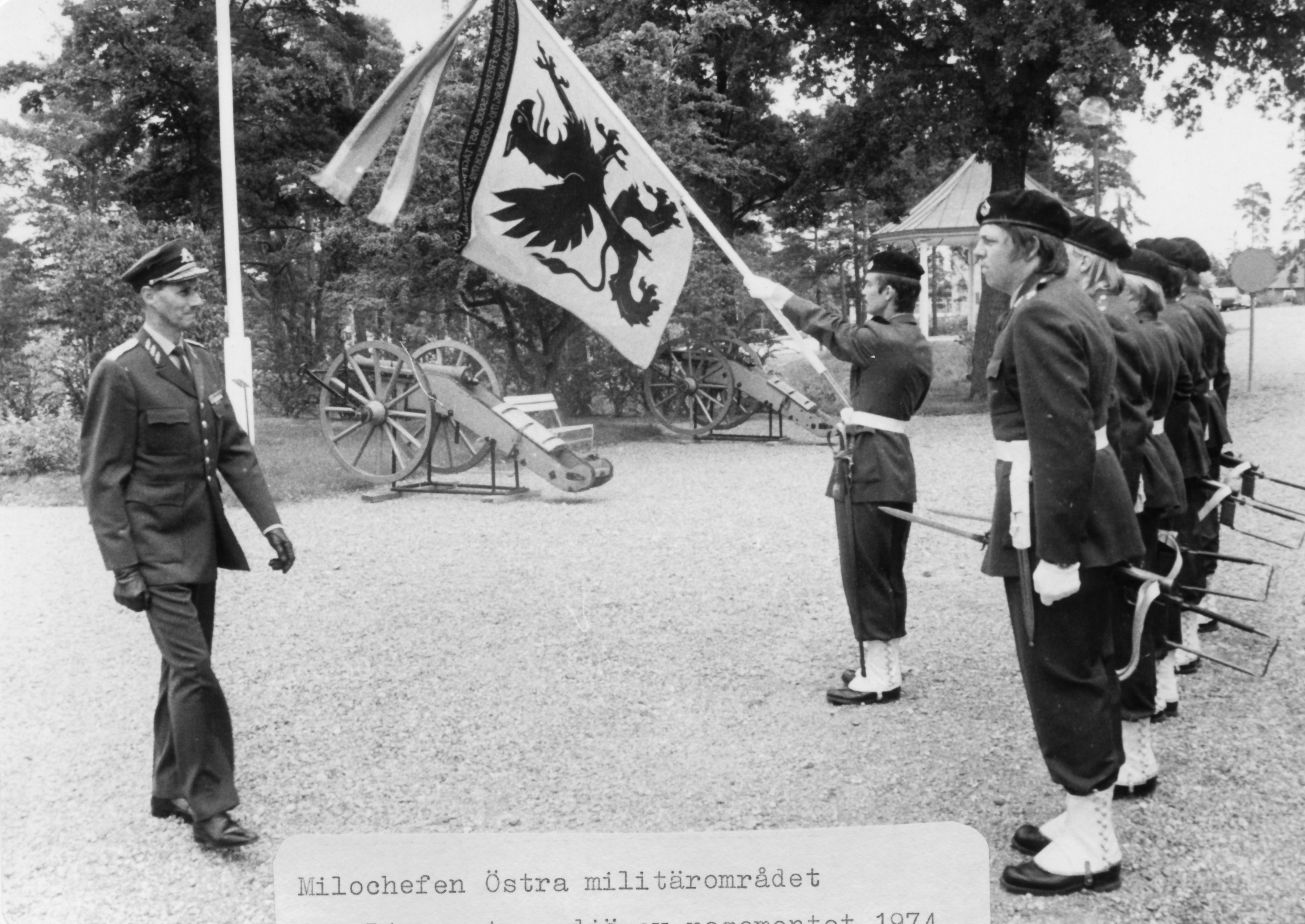
Picture from 1974 of the color guard of P 10 and Lieutenant General Ove Ljung

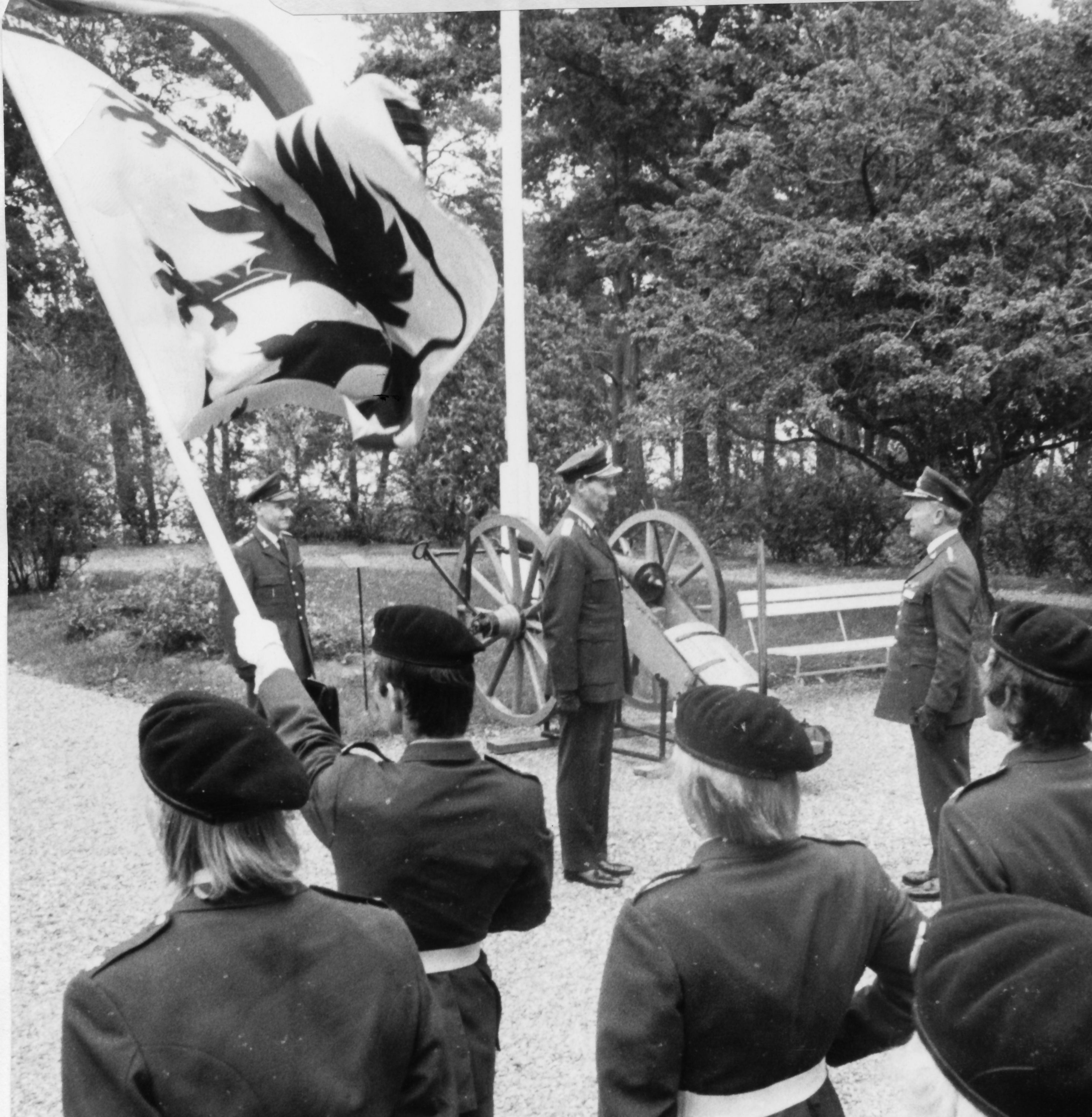
Picture from 1974 of the color guard of P 10 and Lieutenant General Ove Ljung

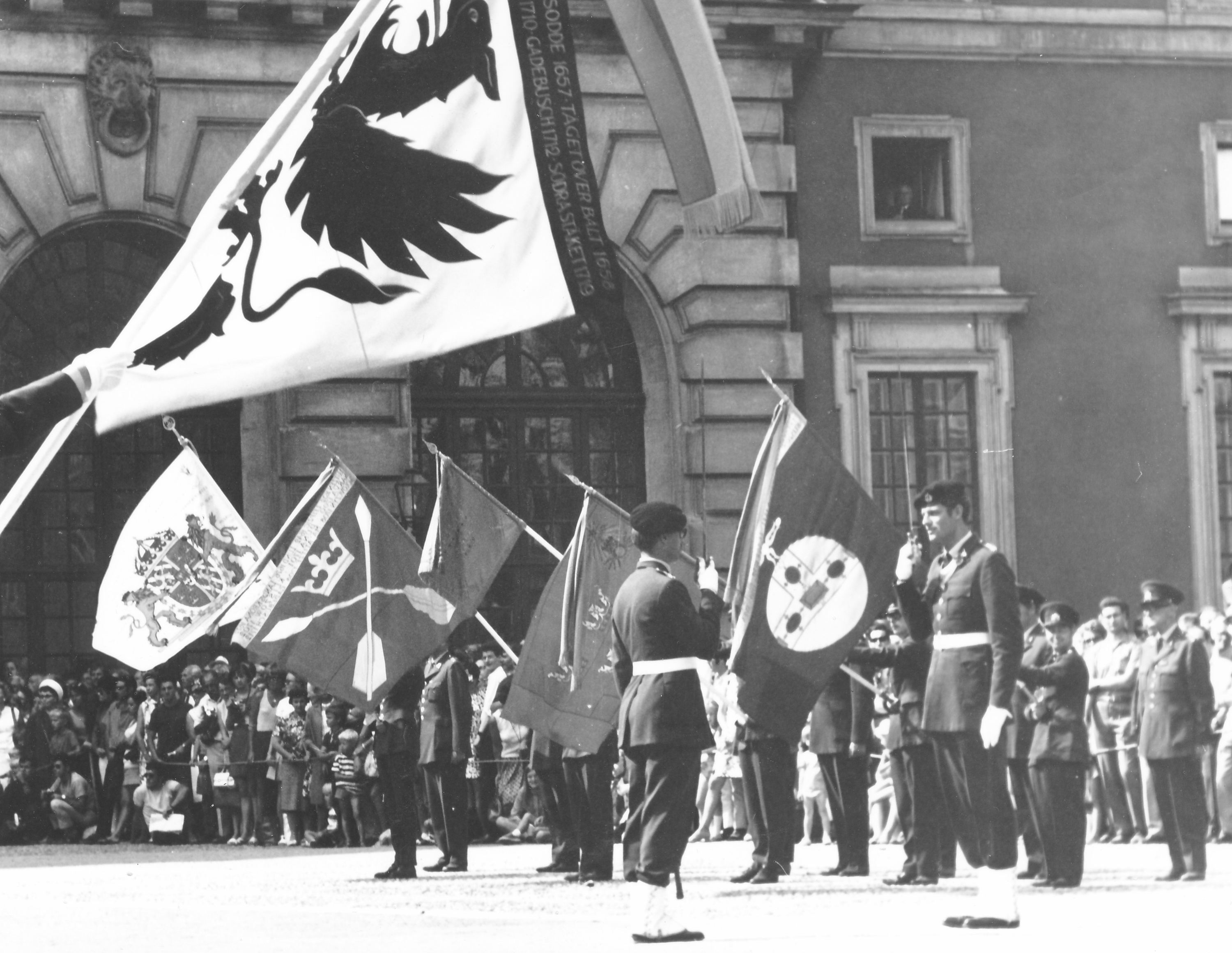
Color shown in the foreground at Stockholm Palace in 1969.

=== Coat of arms ===
The coat of the arms of the Södermanland Regiment (P 10/Fo 43) 1977–1994, the Södermanland Brigade (MekB 10) 1994–2000 and Södermanland Regiment (P 10) 2000–2004. Blazon: "Or, the provincial badge of Södermanland, a griffin segreant, sable, armed and langued gules. The shield surmounted two arms in fess, embowed and vambraced, the hands holding swords in saltire, or". The coat of arms of the Södermanland Regiment (P 10/Fo 43) 1994–2000 and the Södermanland Group (Södermanlandsgruppen) since 2000. Blazon: "Or, the provincial badge of Södermanland, a griffin segreant sable, armed and langued gules. The shield surmounted two swords in saltire or".

Coat of arms of the Södermanland Regiment (P 10/Fo 43) 1977–1994, the Södermanland Brigade (MekB 10) 1994–2000 and Södermanland Regiment (P 10) 2000–2004.

Coat of the arms of the Södermanland Regiment (P 10/Fo 43) 1994–2000 and the Södermanland Group (Södermanlandsgruppen‍) 2000–present.

=== Medals ===
In 1990, the Södermanlands försvarsområdes (Fo 43) förtjänstmedalj ("Södermanland Defence District (Fo 43) Medal of Merit") in gold and silver (SödfoGM/SM) of the 8th size was established. In 2000, this medal was renamed Södermanlands regementes (P 10) förtjänstmedalj ("Södermanland Regiment (P 10) Medal of Merit") in gold and silver (SödermlregGM/SM). It was used until 2004. The medal ribbon is of yellow moiré with three evenly divided black stripes.

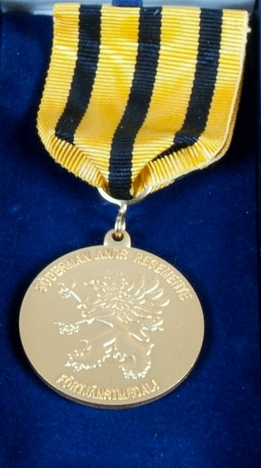
Södermanland Regiment (P 10) Medal of Merit in gold.

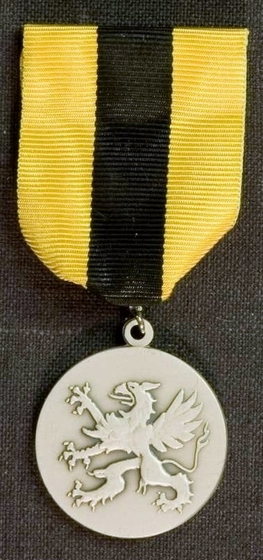
Södermanland Regiment (P 10) Commemorative Medal.

=== Other ===
The regimental anniversary was 13 August, in memory of the Battle of Stäket in 1719.

== Commanding officers ==
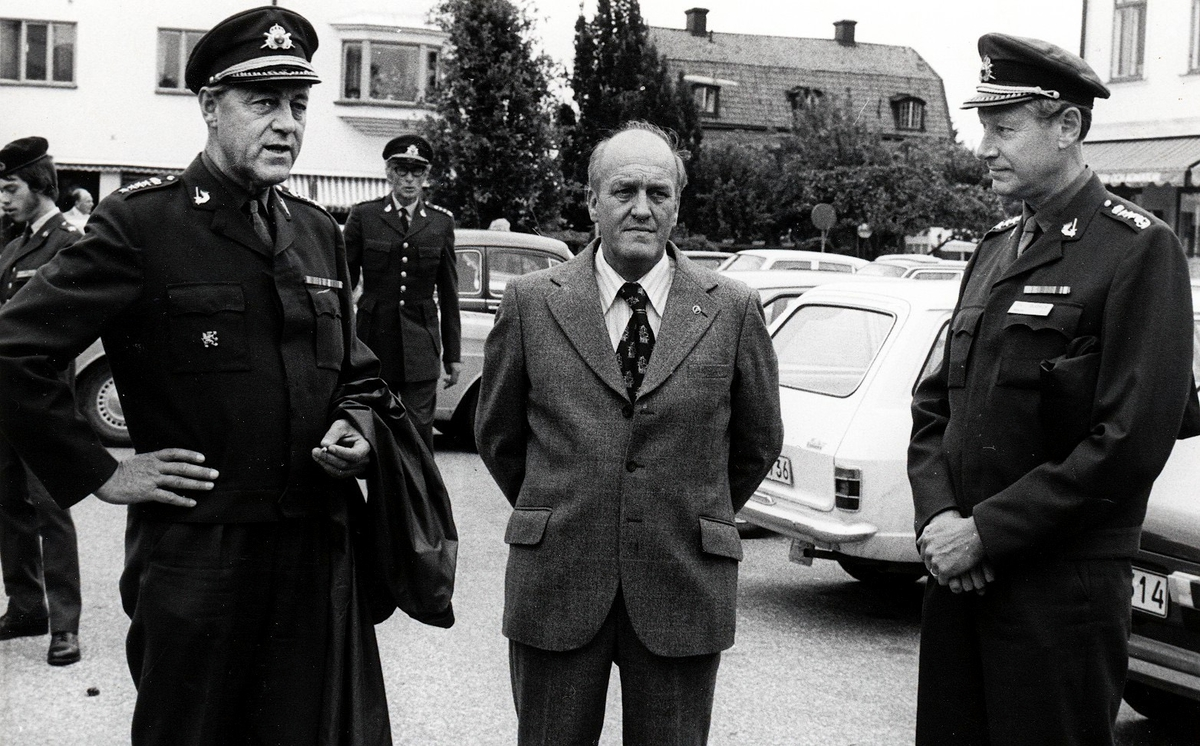
The regimental commander 1976–1979, Senior Colonel Nils Stenqvist (left) in 1977, together with the commander of P 1, Colonel Sven Björck (right).

Regimental commanders 1942–1957 and 1963–2005.

- 1942–1956: Erik Cavalli
- 1956–1956: Fritz-Ivar Virgin
- 1956–1963: See Södermanland Regiment (infantry)
- 1963–1963: Fritz-Ivar Virgin
- 1963–1970: Gunnar Henrikson
- 1970–1976: Stig Wilhelm Colliander
- 1976–1979: Nils Stenqvist
- 1979–1983: Åke Mauritz Eriksson
- 1983–1991: Nils-Gunnar Lundgren
- 1991–1994: Jan Åke Andersson
- 1994–1997: Thor-Lennart Loo
- 1997–2000: Peter Georg Theodor Lundberg
- 2000–2003: Ingemar Gustafsson
- 2003–2005: Bengt Degerman

== Names, designations and locations ==
Name	Translation	From		To
Kungl Södermanlands pansarregemente	Royal Södermanland Armoured Regiment	1942-10-01	–	1957-03-31
Kungl Södermanlands regemente	Royal Södermanland Regiment	1963-04-01	–	1974-12-31
Södermanlands regemente	Södermanland Regiment	1975-01-01	–	2004-12-31
Avvecklingsorganisation	Decommissioning Organisation	2005-01-01	–	2006-06-30
Designation		From		To
P 3		1942-10-01	–	1957-03-31
P 10		1963-04-01	–	1973-06-30
P 10/Fo 43		1973-07-01	–	2000-06-30
P 10		2000-07-01	–	2004-12-31
AO P 10		2005-01-01	–	2006-06-30
Locations		From		To
Strängnäs Garrison/Eldsundsviken		1942-10-01	–	1957-03-31
Strängnäs Garrison/Eldsundsviken		1963-04-01	–	2006-06-30

== See also ==
- Södermanland Regiment (infantry)
- List of Swedish armoured regiments
