= Södermanland Brigade =

- Södermanlandsbrigaden
- Active: 1943–1974, 1982–2000
- Country: Sweden
- Allegiance: Swedish Armed Forces
- Branch: Swedish Army
- Type: Infantry (1957–1963); Armoured (1949–1957, 1963–1974, 1982–2000)
- Role: Armoured brigade (1949–1957, 1963–1974); Infantry brigade (1957–1963); Mechanized brigade (1982–2000)
- Size: Brigade
- Part of: Södermanland Regiment (1949–1994); Milo M (1994–2000)
- Garrison/HQ: Strängnäs
- Mottos: Regimus neque hostis (Note: The motto was adopted in 1984 by the then brigade commander of Södermanland Brigade, colonel Björn Bernroth. It was later used by the 27th Home Guard Battalion.) ("We decide - not the enemy")
- Colors: Yellow and black
- March: "Södermanlands regementes marsch" (Lundvall) (Note: The march was adopted in 1994 and established on 13 June 1996.)
- Anniversaries: 13 August (Note: In memory of the Battle of Stäket on 13 August 1719.)
- Battle honours: Warsaw (1656), Frederiksodde (1658), Tåget över Bält (1658), Fraustadt (1706), Helsingborg (1710), Gadebusch (1712), Stäket (1719)

Insignia
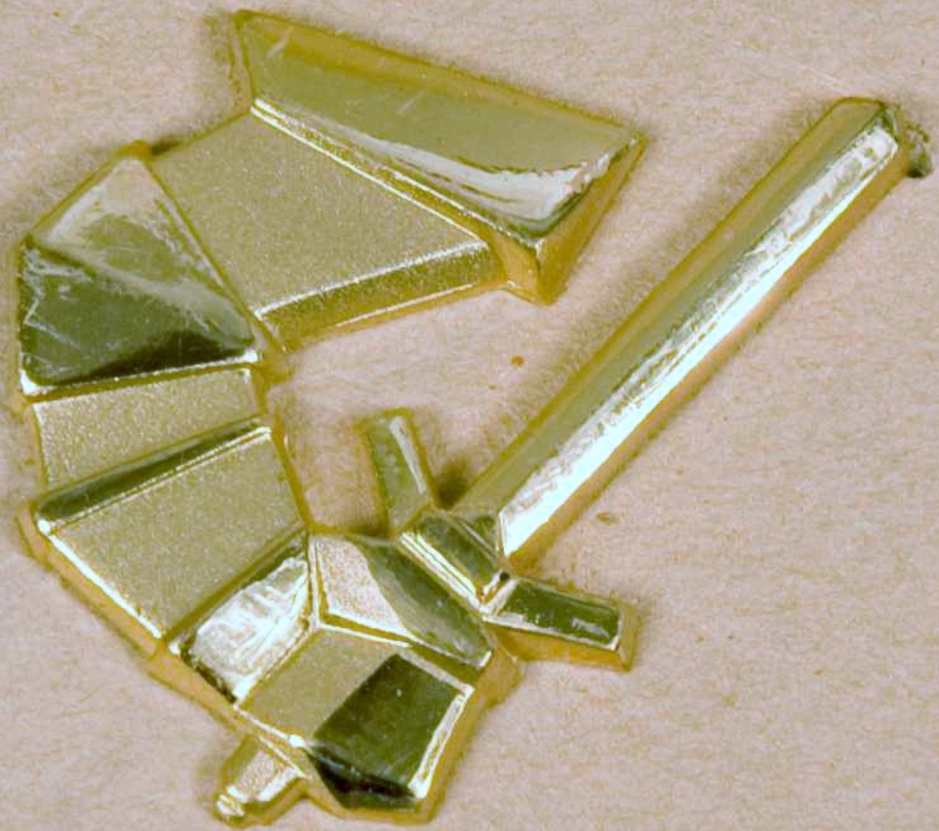
- Branch insignia

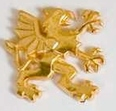
- Unit insignia

Södermanland Brigade (Swedish: Södermanlandsbrigaden), also PB 10 or MekB 10, was a Swedish Army armoured brigade located in the province of Södermanland. Most of the brigade was trained at Södermanland regiment. The brigade was decommissioned in 2000

== History ==
In 1963, the brigade was converted from an infantry brigade into an armoured brigade. The unit was disbanded as a result of the disarmament policies set forward in the Defence Act of 2000.

== Heraldry and traditions ==
The Södermanland Brigade shared heraldry and traditions with Södermanland Regiment.

=== Coat of arms ===
The coat of the arms of the Södermanland Brigade (MekB 10) 1994–2000. It was also used by the Södermanland Regiment (P 10/Fo 43) 1977–1994 and the Södermanland Regiment (P 10) 2000–2004. Blazon: "Or, the provincial badge of Södermanland, a griffin segreant, sable, armed and langued gules. The shield surmounted two arms in fess, embowed and vambraced, the hands holding swords in saltire, or".

== Commanding officers ==
- 1943–1974: ?
- 1983–198?: Colonel Björn Bernroth
- 198?–1994:
- 1991–1994: Colonel Ulf Henricsson
- 1995–1997: Colonel Lars Bergström
- 1998–2000: Colonel Fhleming Christensen

== Names, designations and locations ==
| Name | Translation | From | | To |
|---|---|---|---|---|
| 10. pansarbrigaden | 10th Armoured Brigade | 1943 | – | 1949-09-30 |
| Södermanlandsbrigaden | Södermanland Brigade | 1949-10-01 | – | 1974-06-30 |
| Södermanlandsbrigaden | Södermanland Brigade | 1982-07-01? | – | 2000-06-30 |
| Designation | | From | | To |
| 10. pansarbrig | | 1943 | – | 1949-09-30 |
| PB 10 | | 1949-10-01 | – | 1957-03-31 |
| IB 10 | | 1957-04-01 | – | 1963-03-31 |
| PB 10 | | 1963-04-01 | – | 1974-06-30 |
| MekB 10 | | 1982-07-01? | – | 2000-06-30 |
| Location | | From | | To |
| Strängnäs Garrison | | 1943 | – | 2000-06-30 |

== See also ==
- List of Swedish Army brigades
