= South Scanian Infantry Regiment =

Royal South Scanian Infantry Regiment
- Kungliga Södra skånska infanteriregementet
- Active: 1811–1963
- Country: Sweden
- Allegiance: Swedish Armed Forces
- Branch: Swedish Army
- Type: Infantry
- Size: Regiment
- Part of: 1st Military District (1833–1893); 1st Army Division (1893–1901); I Army Division (1902–1927); Southern Army Division (1928–1936); I Army Division (1937–1942); I Military District (1942–1963)
- Garrison/HQ: Ystad
- Nickname(s): Södra skåningarna
- Motto(s): Slå snabbt - slå hårt
- Colors: Red and yellow
- March: "Souvenir-Marsch" (F. Zikoff) (Note: The unit march was established in 1953 by Army Order 33/1953. It was taken over by the South Scanian Regiment in 1963.)
- Mascot(s): Dubbeleken

Commanders
- Notable commanders: Carl August Ehrensvärd; Viking Tamm

Insignia
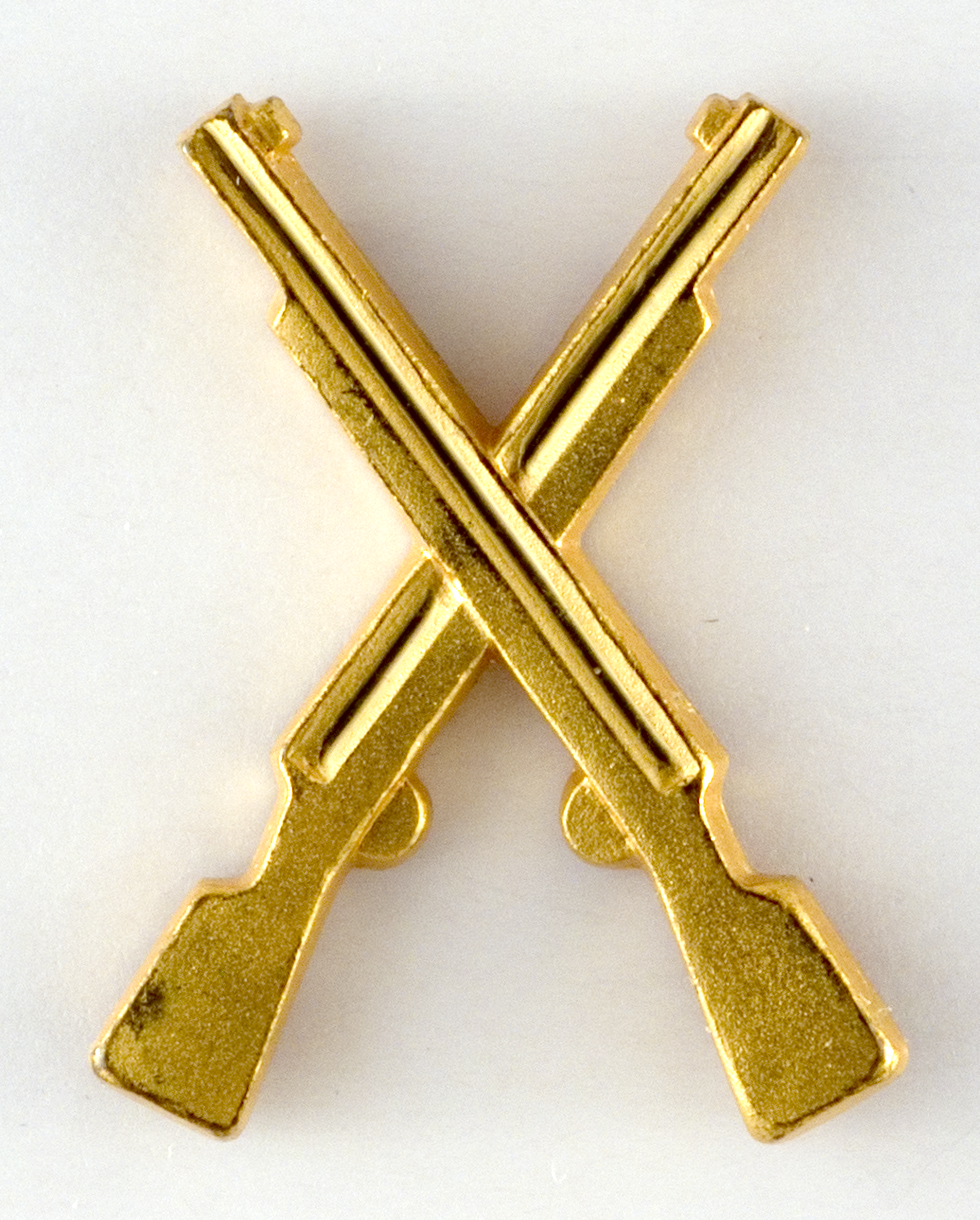
- Branch insignia m/1960

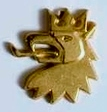
- Unit insignia m/1960

The Royal South Scanian Infantry Regiment (Swedish: Kungliga Södra skånska infanteriregementet), designation I 7, was a Swedish Army infantry regiment founded on 10 December 1811 to address the gaps left by the loss of Finland. It was stationed in southern Scania, recruiting soldiers from local counties. The regiment initially used the rotation system for recruitment and trained at various locations such as Veberöd and Tvedöra. In 1816, a new numbering system for Swedish regiments was introduced, with I 25 assigned to the Royal Southern Scanian Infantry Regiment. In 1925, a merger with the Royal Northern Scanian Infantry Regiment was proposed, but the regiment remained intact, though it was moved to Ystad. The regiment also underwent significant reorganizations, including being motorized in 1942 and transitioning to an armored regiment in 1949. During World War II, the regiment's operations expanded, and it became part of the Southern Army Division. The regiment was reorganized and renamed under several defence acts, and its barracks and training areas shifted over time. In 1963, the regiment was transferred to the armored corps, becoming an armored regiment under the name South Scanian Regiment (P 7).

== History ==
The Southern Scanian Infantry Regiment (No. 25) was established by letters patent on 10 December 1811. It was formed alongside the Royal Northern Scanian Infantry Regiment to help fill the void left by the loss of Finland. The regiment was stationed in the southern part of Scania, with 206 recruits from Kristianstad County and 769 from Malmöhus County. The rotation system (an old feudal method of recruiting) was primarily implemented through the use of extra rotations (new formation of regiments from district till then privileged). The regiment recruited its conscripted soldiers from Malmöhus County, and its assembly point was at Revinge. The regiment conducted weapons training from 1816 at Veberöd, from 1823 at Tvedöra hed, and from 1888 at Revingehed.

The ranking system established in the 1634 Instrument of Government began to falter and create gaps after the Treaty of Fredrikshamn on 17 September 1809, when Finland was ceded to Russia and the Swedish regiments in Finland were disbanded. This created a need for a new system. Under Crown Princ Charles John, a new numbering system was introduced in 1816, whereby Swedish regiments were assigned an official order number by a general order on 26 March 1816, such as No. 25 Southern Scanian Infantry Regiment. The numbering system was based not only on a regiment's status but also on the internal order of the Swedish provinces, with Svealand, Götaland, and Norrland being alternated. The lowest numbers were assigned to the "Life and Household Troops." However, these numbers had no bearing on rank, as shown by old records in which infantry and cavalry units were mixed with respect to rank and dignity.

In connection with the Defence Act of 1914, all order numbers within the army were adjusted. For example, the Southern Scanian Infantry Regiment was assigned the designation I 25. The adjustment was made to distinguish between regiments and corps of different arms of service, as names and numbers like No. 3 Life Regiment Grenadier Corps and No. 3 Life Regiment Hussar Corps could appear confusing to those unfamiliar with the fact that these units belonged to different branches.

In preparation for what was intended to be the Defence Act of 1924, the government proposed, among other things, the relocation of the Southern Scanian Infantry Regiment from the Lund garrison to the Ystad garrison. However, the Swedish government's proposal was rejected when the majority of the parliament voted against it, which led to the resignation of the government. The Defence Act was instead presented in 1925 by the new government, which proposed, among other things, the merger of the Northern Scanian Infantry Regiment and the Southern Scanian Infantry Regiment. The new regiment was to be called the Scanian Infantry Regiment and stationed at the Northern Scanian Infantry Regiment's barracks in the Kristianstad garrison. In practice, this would have meant the disbanding of the regiment in Lund and a renaming of the regiment in Kristianstad.

The regiment, however, was spared from disbandment in the Defence Act of 1925, but the 1924 proposal to relocate it to Ystad was implemented. Furthermore, like other infantry regiments, the regiment was reduced by one battalion and, from 1 January 1928, was reorganized to consist of two infantry battalions. With the implementation of the Defence Act of 1925, significant parts of the previous ranking system were disrupted. This happened when units with high regimental numbers were moved into lower-numbered vacancies created by disbanded or merged regiments, and were thus assigned ranks according to their new position in the numbering sequence. The Southern Scanian Infantry Regiment, which had a high regimental number, took over, from 1 January 1928, the number previously held by the Karlskrona Grenadier Regiment, i.e., I 7.

After World War II, the plan was for Sweden's defence to be downsized, as outlined in the defence committee's (Försvarskommittén) report from 1945 in preparation for the Defence Act of 1948. This report included a proposal to reduce operations at the Southern Scanian Infantry Regiment. However, instead of a de-escalation of the security situation in Europe after the war, a new security policy emerged with the onset of the Cold War, which can be said to have been triggered by the 1948 Czechoslovak coup d'état. This led the defence minister to advocate for strengthening the military. In December 1947, the defence committee's proposal was rejected, and a decision was made to strengthen the defence, meaning that the operations of the Southern Scanian Infantry Regiment were not reduced, but rather expanded. The regiment became the first infantry regiment in the Swedish Army to be motorized when the 7th Motorized Brigade was established in 1942. In 1949, the regiment became an armored infantry regiment and, in 1963, was transferred to the armored corps, becoming an armored regiment under the name South Scanian Regiment (P 7).

== Units ==
The 1901 Army Ordinance established that troop access would be regulated through universal conscription, which led to the expansion of infantry regiments by one battalion, increasing them to three infantry battalions. With the outbreak of war in 1914, the Defence Act of 1914 was made, which included the organization and mobilization of the line regiment I 25. Like other infantry regiments, a reserve regiment was also to be established, but these were never mobilized. Additionally, a brigade structure was introduced in the army, where two infantry regiments formed a brigade. I 24, together with I 25, formed the 2nd Infantry Brigade (2. infanteribrigaden), which was part of the I Army Division (I. arméfördelningen).

The Defence Act of 1925 led to significant cuts in the defence. Among other things, reserve regiments were abolished, and the number of army divisions was reduced by two. Furthermore, all infantry regiments were reduced by one battalion and, starting 1 January 1928, were reorganized to consist of two infantry battalions. The earlier line regiments were replaced with the term "field regiments."

As a result of defence cuts at the end of the 1920s, the regiment could only muster two battalions at the outbreak of war in 1939. However, these battalions were neither fully manned nor equipped. Under the new organization, the regiment was placed under the command of the Southern Army Division.

Through the Defence Act of 1942, the defence's war organization was strengthened. This included the addition of a third battalion to the infantry regiments and the establishment of two field regiments for nearly all units. One remained the regular regiment, and the other, a newly created unit, became a so-called doubling regiment (dubbleringsregemente). The doubling regiment received the regular regiment's number plus 30. For example, the Southern Scanian Infantry Regiment had the numbers I 7 and I 37. The peacetime regiment was designated I 7 Depot to distinguish it from the wartime units.

Through the Defence Act of 1948, the field regiments were reorganized into brigades.

== Barracks and training areas ==
=== Barracks ===
==== Training areas ====
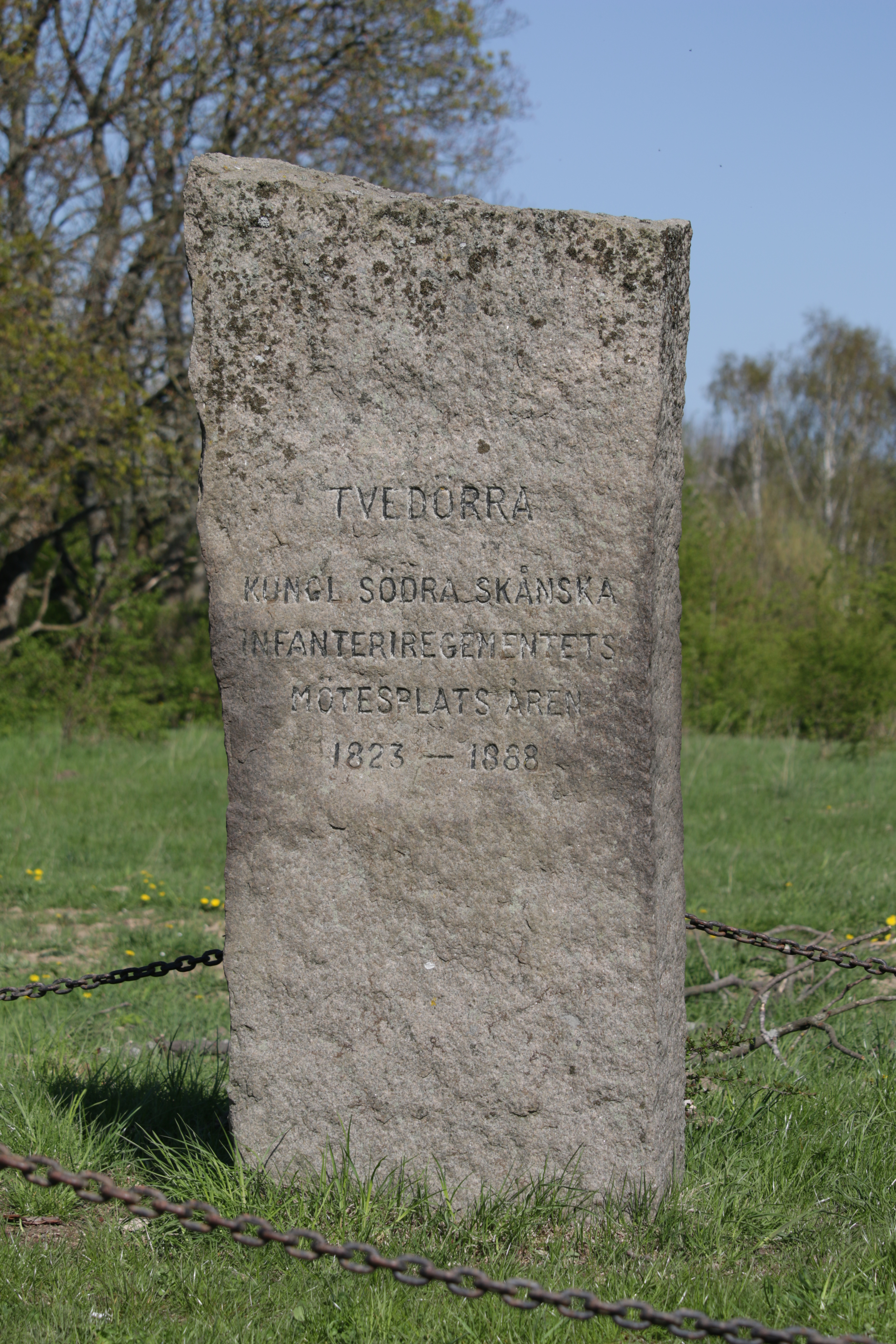
The memorial stone at Tvedöra Heath

The regiment trained in Veberöd starting in 1816, but from 1823, training took place in Tvedöra, and from 1888 at Revingehed. The training field was later expanded to accommodate the need for contiguous training areas suitable for the vehicles used in modern units, and as of 2023, it covers approximately 4,500 hectares.

=== Barracks ===
When the regiment was formed, the regimental headquarters was established in Malmö in 1812. From 1827 to 1914, the headquarters alternated between Lund and Malmö. On 5 November 1914, the entire regiment was stationed in Lund, with accommodations at Fabriksgatan 2 and Lilla Södergatan 3, and a hospital at Östra Mårtensgatan 3. However, these accommodations were only temporary, as a new barracks complex was planned to be built in Vipeholm, in eastern Lund. In 1919, a barracks intended for two companies was completed, but the construction of the remaining barracks was halted, pending future defence act. Following the Defence Act of 1925, the regiment took over the barracks complex on Dragongatan in Ystad on 1 January 1928, which had previously been part of the Scanian Dragoon Regiment until 31 December 1927. The barracks complex was built in 1897 according to the 1892 Army Ordinance's building program and originally consisted of two cavalry barracks. After the 1901 Army Ordinance, additional barracks were built in the area, designed by Erik Josephson. The barracks complex in Lund was completed in 1930, but only four so-called half-battalion barracks were constructed out of the six originally planned, and no administrative building or dining hall was built. On the other hand, the barracks complex was never used by the army as originally intended. Instead, Vipeholm's institution for the mentally disabled opened on the site in 1935. The institution later became infamous for the so-called Vipeholm experiments.

Until 1982, the regiment conducted training both in Ystad and Revingehed. On 26 May 1982, a farewell ceremony was held in Ystad, and by 10 June, the entire training battalion had assembled in Revingehed. From 1 July 1982, the majority of the barracks complex was taken over by the Scanian Anti-Aircraft Regiment, which relocated from Malmö. On 31 December 1997, both the South Scanian Regiment and the Scanian Anti-Aircraft Regiment were disbanded. The entire barracks area, which then consisted of over 40 buildings, was sold to the Ystad Municipality and later designated as a national heritage site. Since 1 July 1982, the regiment has been based in Revingehed.

== Heraldry and traditions ==
=== Medals ===
In 1913, the Södra skånska infanteriregementets (I 7) förtjänstmedalj ("South Scanian Infantry Regiment (I 7) Medal of Merit") in gold/silver/bronze (SSkånregGM/SM/BM) of the 12th size was established. It was later renamed and until 1987, it was called Södra skånska regementets och Malmö försvarsområdes förtjänstmedalj ("South Scanian Regiment and Malmö Defence District Medal of Merit") (SödskånregGM/SM/BM) and then until 1999 it was called Södra skånska regementets och Södra skånska brigadens förtjänstmedalj ("South Scanian Regiment and South Scanian Brigade") (SödskånregbrigGM/SM/BM). Today it is called Södra skånska regementets (P 7) förtjänstmedalj ("South Scanian Regiment (P 7) Medal of Merit"). The medal ribbon is of yellow moiré with a red stripe on each side.

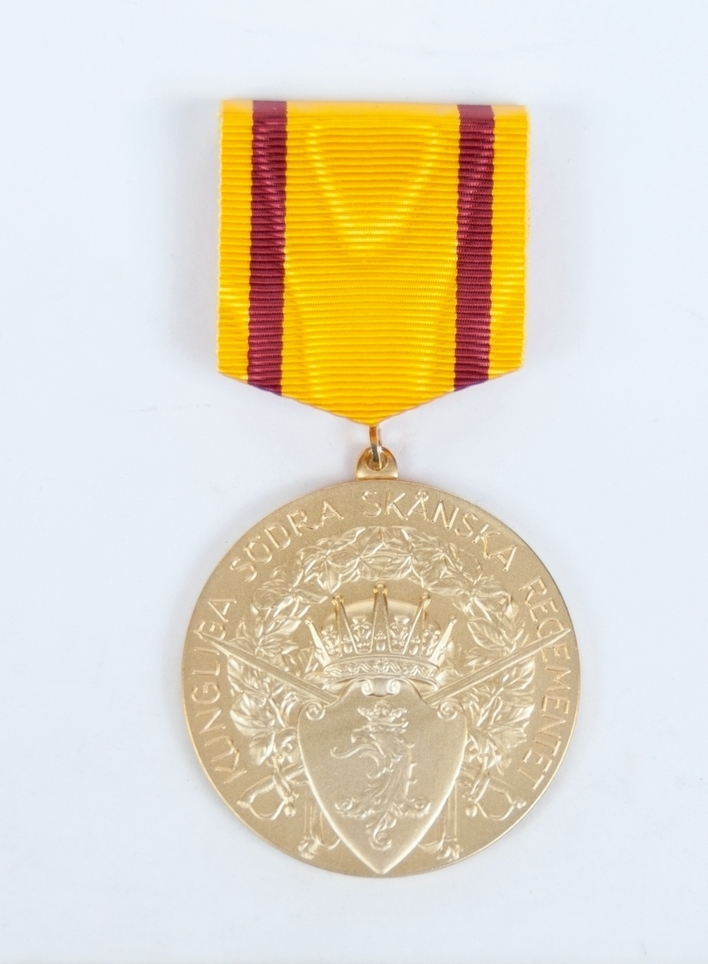
South Scanian Regiment (P 7) Medal of Merit in gold

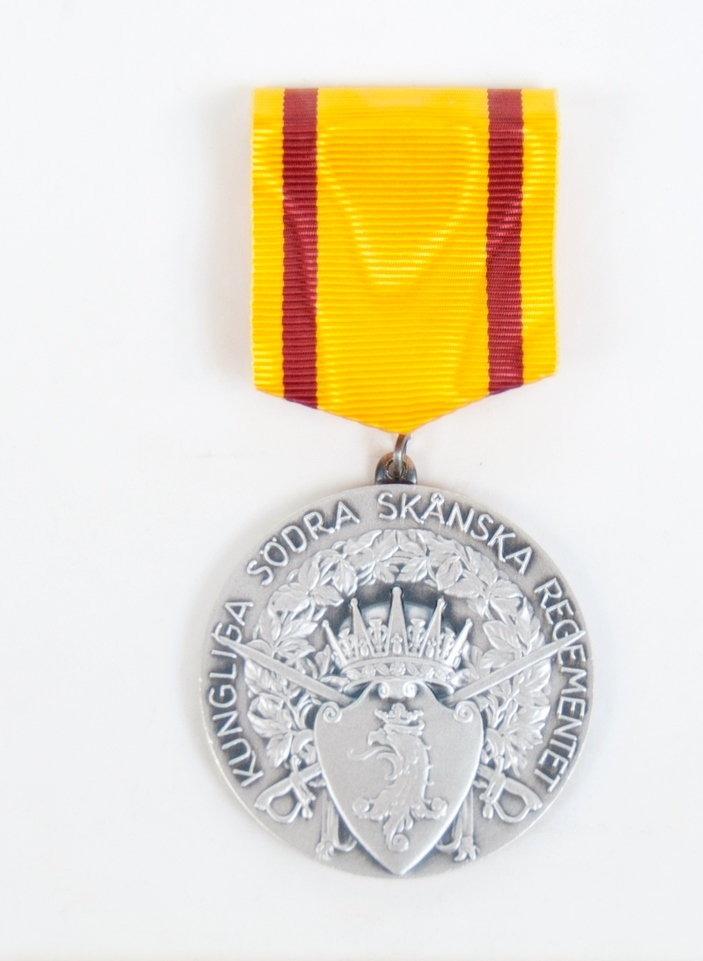
South Scanian Regiment (P 7) Medal of Merit in silver

== Commanding officers ==
Regimental commander from 1811 to 1963.

- 1811–1812: Johan Fredrik Eek (acting)
- 1812–1818: Georg Fredrik Reutercrona
- 1818–1841: Mauritz Clairfelt
- 1841–1846: Carl Ström
- 1846–1850: Edvard August Peijron
- 1850–1855: Ivan Feodor Aminoff
- 1855–1862: Gustaf Åberg
- 1862–1870: Axel August Thott
- 1870–1883: Axel Isak von Porat
- 1883–1888: Henrik August Ankarcrona
- 1888–1895: Anton Gustaf Jonas af Jochnick
- 1895–1904: Henric Fredric Gyllenram
- 1904–1912: Sixten Lewenhaupt
- 1912–1915: John Montgomery
- 1915–1923: Sven Nystedt
- 1923–1932: Georg Björnström
- 1932–1937: Torsten Winberg
- 1937–1941: Einar Björk
- 1941–1941: Carl August Ehrensvärd (acting)
- 1942–1944: Viking Tamm
- 1944–1947: Gunnar Möller
- 1947–1952: Gilbert Nordqvist
- 1952–1955: Axel Emil Bancroft Flach
- 1955–1962: Per-Hjalmar Bauer
- 1962–1963: Carl Eric Svärd

== Names, designations and locations ==
Name	Translation	From		To
Kungl. Södra skånska infanteriregementet	Royal South Scanian Infantry Regiment	1811-12-10	–	1963-03-31
Designation		From		To
No 25		1816-03-26	–	1914-09-30
I 25		1914-10-01	–	1927-12-28
I 7		1928-01-01	–	1963-03-31
Locations		From		To
Lund Garrison		1914-11-05	–	1928-03-31
Ystad Garrison		1928-04-01	–	1963-03-31

== See also ==
- South Scanian Regiment
- List of Swedish infantry regiments
