= Idala =

- Location within Skåne Location within Sweden
- Coordinates: 55°37′N 13°30′E
- Country: Sweden
- Province: Skåne
- County: Skåne County
- Municipality: Lund Municipality

Area
  - Total: 0.85 km^{2} (0.33 sq mi)

Population (31 December 2010)
  - Total: 738
  - Density: 866/km^{2} (2,240/sq mi)
- Time zone: UTC+1 (CET)
  - Summer (DST): UTC+2 (CEST)

Idala was a locality situated in Lund Municipality, Skåne County, in southern Sweden, with 738 inhabitants in 2010. It was merged into Veberöd in 2015.
