= South Skåne Regiment =

Military unit in Sweden

Coordinates: 55°42′59″N 13°29′54″E

- Södra skånska regementet
- Active: 1963–1997; 2000–present
- Country: Sweden
- Branch: Swedish Army
- Type: Armoured
- Size: Regiment
- Part of: I Military District (1963–1966); Milo S (1966–2000); OPIL (2000–2005); SAFHQ (2005–present)
- Headquarters: Revinge Garrison
- Nickname: Södra Skåningarna ("South Scanians")
- Mottos: Framåtanda och stolthet ("Ambition and pride"); Slå snabbt - slå hårt (Note: The motto was chosen by Colonel Carl August Ehrenswärd when he, as regimental commander, led the regiment's reorganization to a motorized unit in 1941–1942.) ("Hit fast - hit hard")
- Colors: Yellow and red
- March: "Souvenir-marsch" (F. Zikoff) (Note: The march, which was taken over from the South Scanian Infantry Regiment, was established in 1953 by Army Order 33/1953. It was used by the South Scanian Regiment and South Scanian Brigade (Södra skånska regementet och Södra skånska brigaden, MekB 7) from 1994 to 2000, and by the Scanian Group (Skånska gruppen) from 2000.)
- Mascot: Twin-stemmed oak

Commanders
- Current commander: COL Lennart Widerström

Insignia
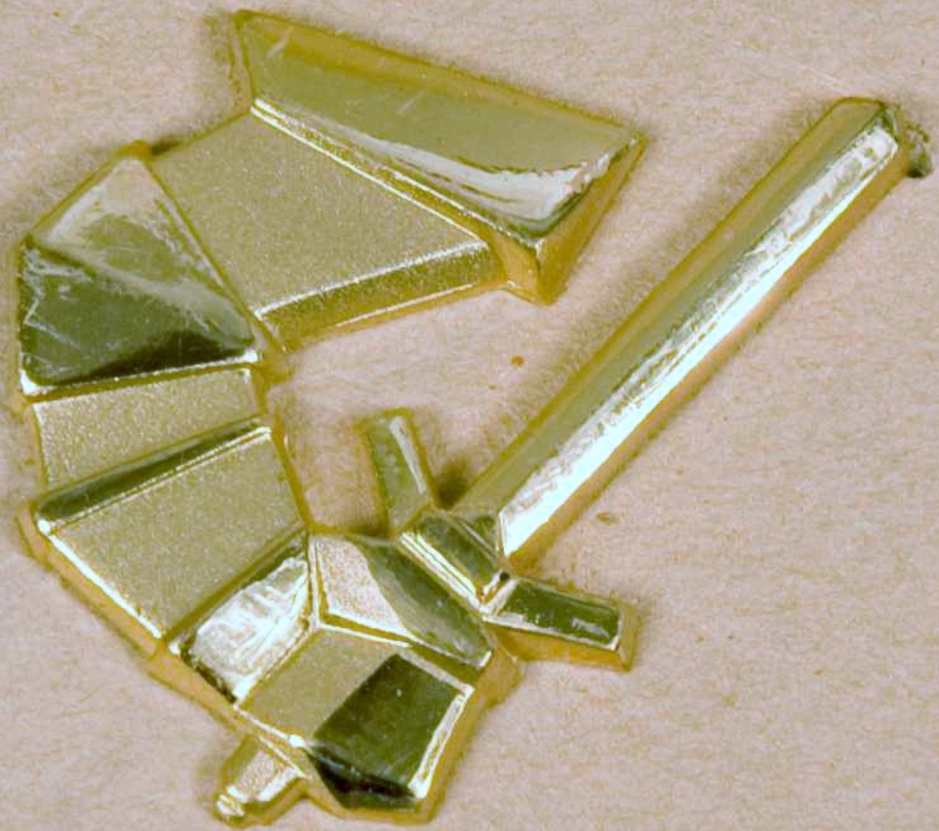
- Branch insignia

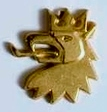
- Unit insignia

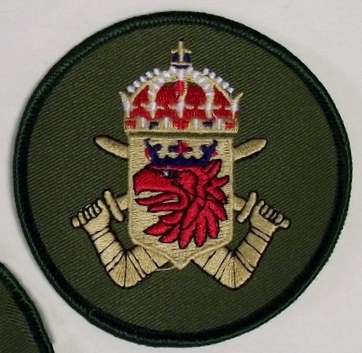
- Shoulder sleeve insignia

The South Skåne Regiment (Swedish: Södra skånska regementet), designation P 7, is a Swedish Army armoured regiment that traces its origins back to 1811. It was converted from the South Scanian Infantry Regiment in 1963 and renamed South Scanian Regiment. The regiment's soldiers were originally recruited from the region of Scania (Skåne), and it is currently garrisoned in Revingehed outside Lund, in Skåne County.

== History ==
The regiment was converted from South Scanian Infantry Regiment to an armored regiment in 1963 and was given the name South Scanian Regiment. In 1982, the regiment carried out a major reorganization when all training activities were transferred to Revingehed and the Scanian Anti-Aircraft Corps (Lv 4) moved into the barracks in Ystad.

== Barracks and training areas ==
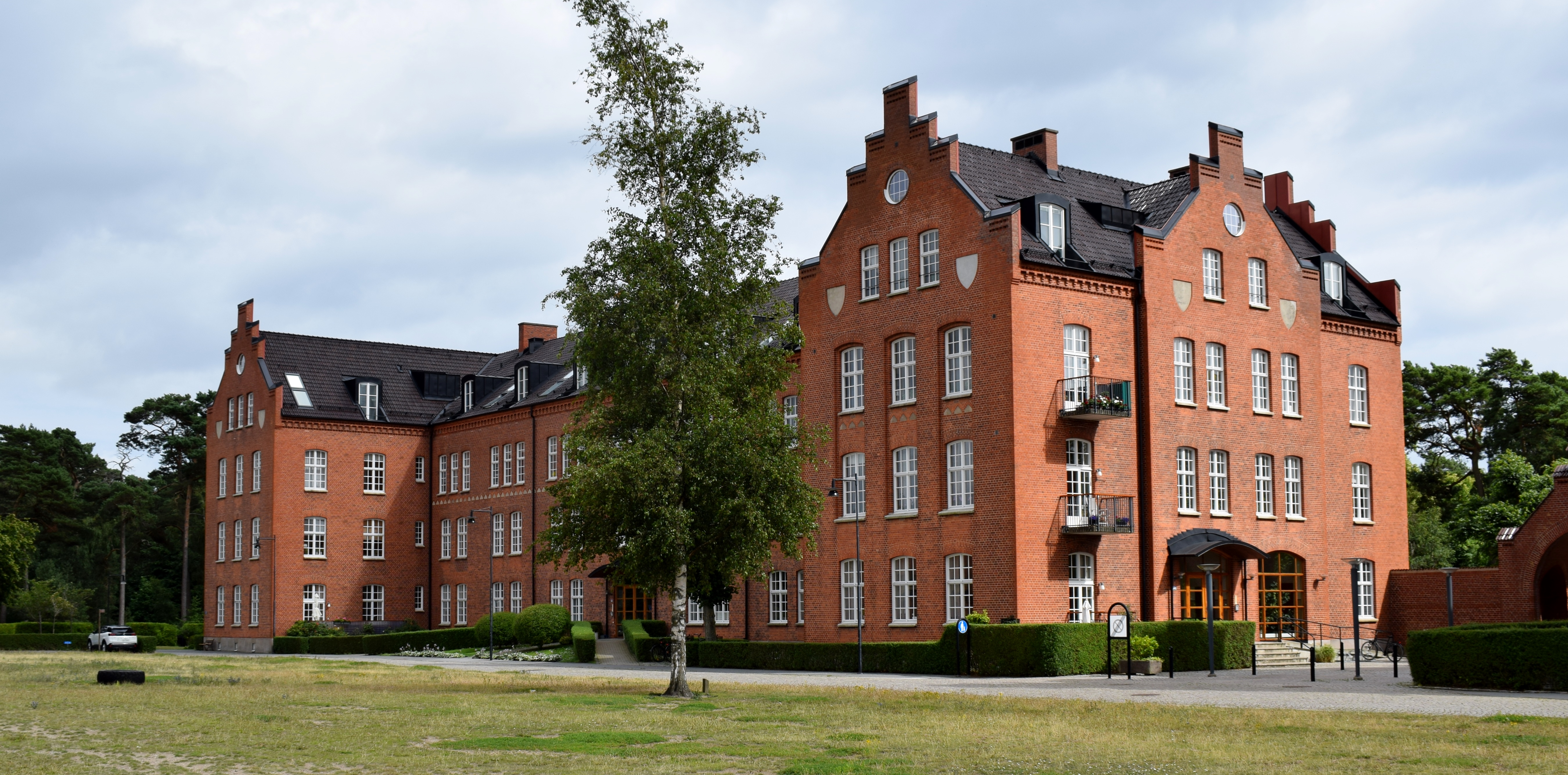
Location in Ystad

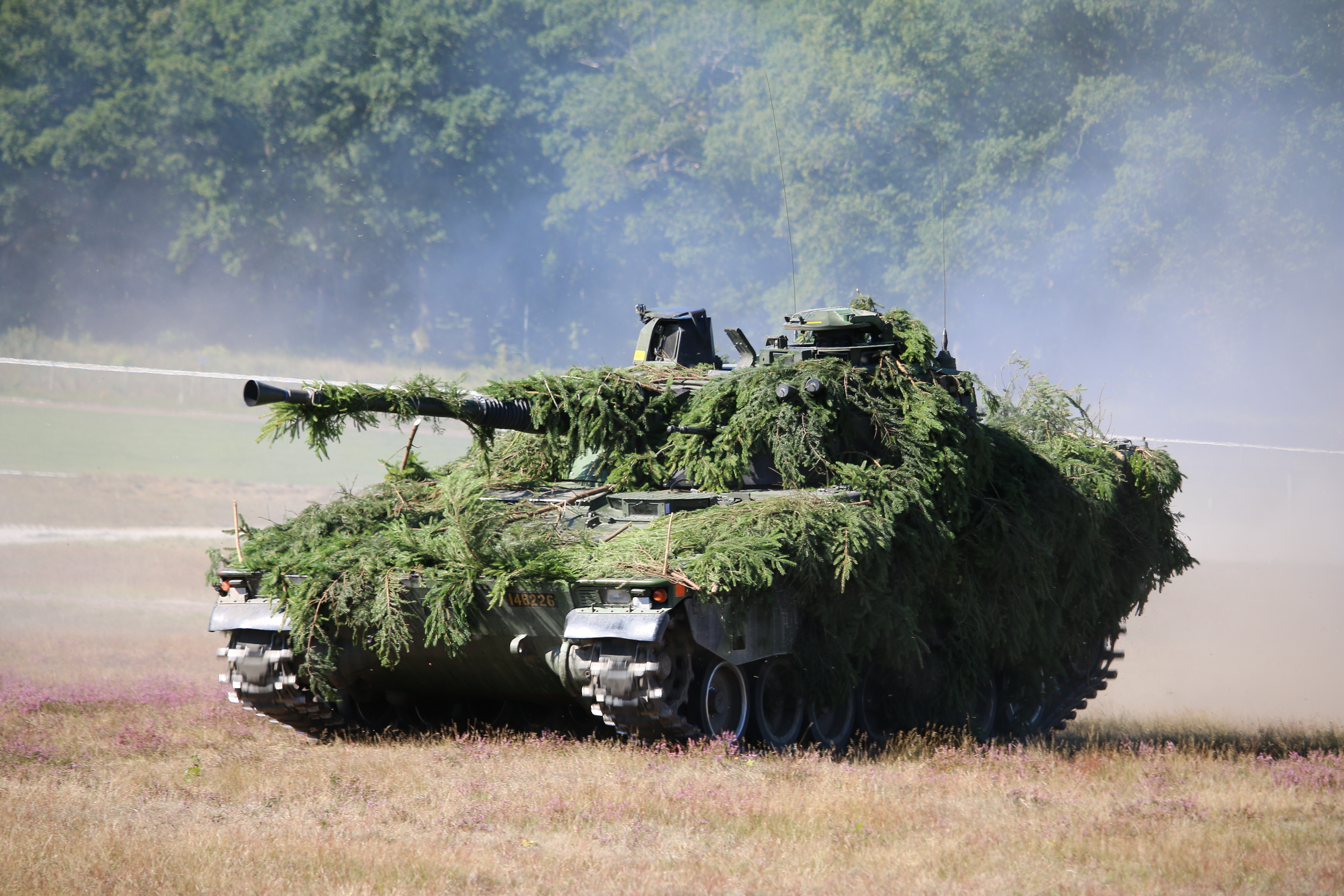
CV90 with the South Scanian Regiment

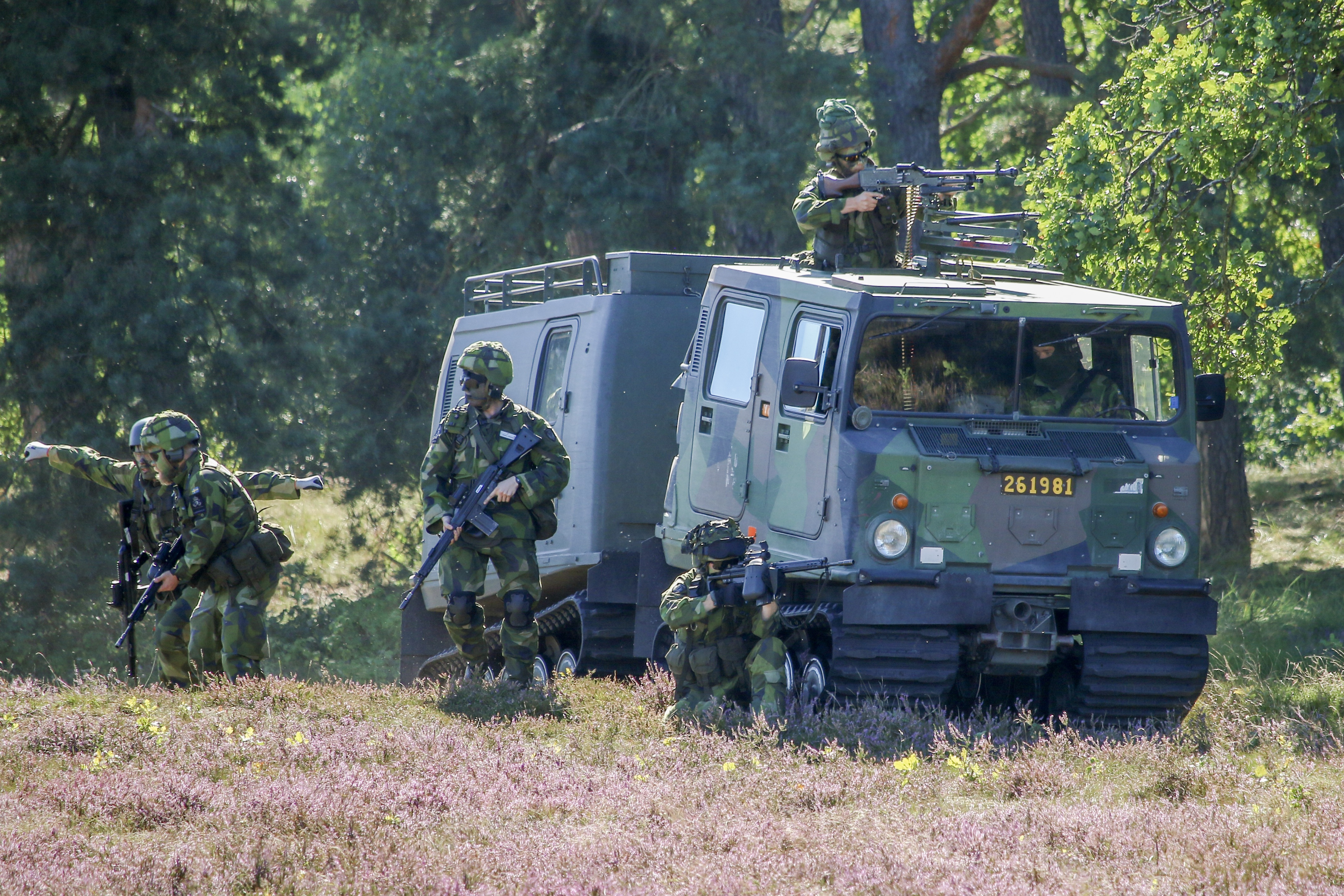
Bandvagn 206

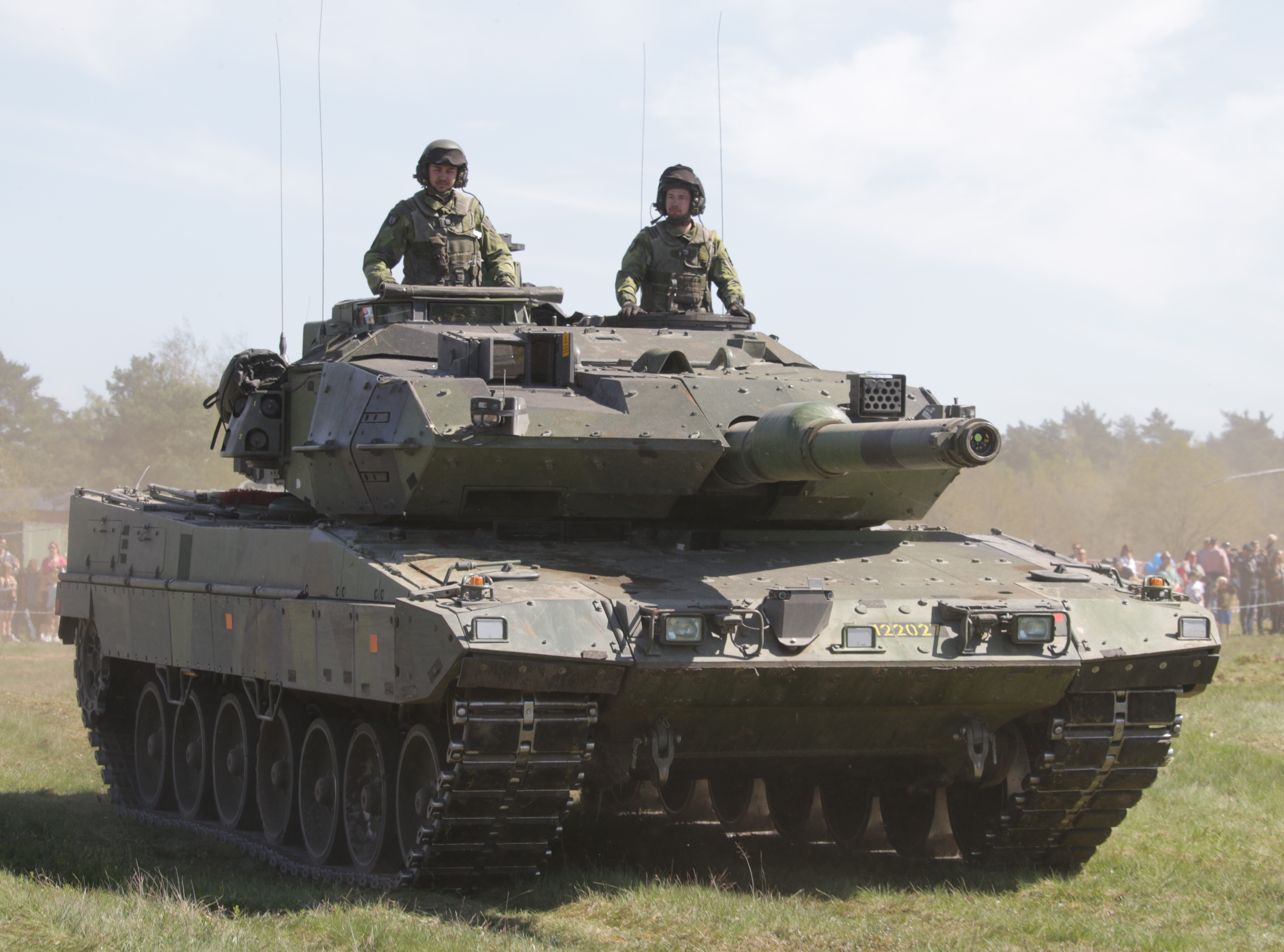
Stridsvagn 122

=== Barracks ===
On 1 January 1928, the regiment, which was originally an infantry regiment, took over the barracks area on Dragongatan in Ystad, which until 31 December 1927 belonged to the Scanian Dragoon Regiment (K 6). The barracks area was built in 1897, and following the 1892 Regimental Building Program, and originally consisted of two cavalry barracks. After the Defence Reform of 1901, additional barracks were built in the area, which were designed by Erik Josephson. Until 1982, the regiment conducted training in both Ystad and Revingehed. On 26 May 1982, a farewell ceremony was held in Ystad, and on 10 June the entire training battalion was deployed to Revingehed.

From 1 July 1982, most of the barracks establishment was taken over by the Scanian Anti-Aircraft Regiment (Lv 4), which were relocated from Malmö. On 31 December 1997, the South Scanian Regiment and the Scanian Anti-Aircraft Regiment were disbanded. The entire barracks area, which then consisted of roughly 40 buildings, was then sold to Ystad Municipality, and was later declared listed buildings. Since 1 July 1982, the regiment is located at Revingehed.

=== Training areas ===
Over the years, the regiment has had its primary training area at Revingehed, which was put into use in 1888. The training area covered approximately 20 hectares in 1887, but was expanded to 100 hectares in 1888. During World War II, the training area was expanded to 1,000 hectares. Since the regiment was reorganized into an armored regiment, the training area was expanded to 4,400 hectares, and with it became Sweden's largest armored training area. Kabusa training area has also belonged to the regiment since the 1940s. The Kabusa training area was expanded in 1943 and 1971.

Through the decommissioning that was done through the various defence acts in the 1990s and 2000s, it has meant that the regiment has added administrative responsibility over a number of training areas in southern Sweden. In addition to the Revingehed and Kabusa, includes since 1 July 2000 Norra Åsum, Björka, Ravlunda and Rinkaby training areas, which were taken over from the Scanian Dragoon Regiment (P 2).

== Heraldry and traditions ==
=== Colours, standards and guidons ===
South Scanian Regiment presents one regimental colour and one regimental standard.

==== Colour of South Scanian Regiment ====
The colour was presented to the then South Scanian Regiment and South Scanian Brigade (MekB 7) at Revingehed by His Majesty the King Carl XVI Gustaf on 26 April 1998. It is used only as regimental colour since 1 July 2000. The colour is drawn by Kristina Holmgård-Åkerberg and embroidered by machine and hand in insertion technique by Maj-Britt Salander/company Blå Kusten. Blazon: "On yellow cloth the provincial badge of Scania; an erazed red head of a griffin with an open blue crown. In the first corner the badge of the Air Defence Corps; two winged red gunbarrels of an older pattern in saltire (a legacy from the former Royal Scanian Anti-Aircraft Regiment (Lv 4)."

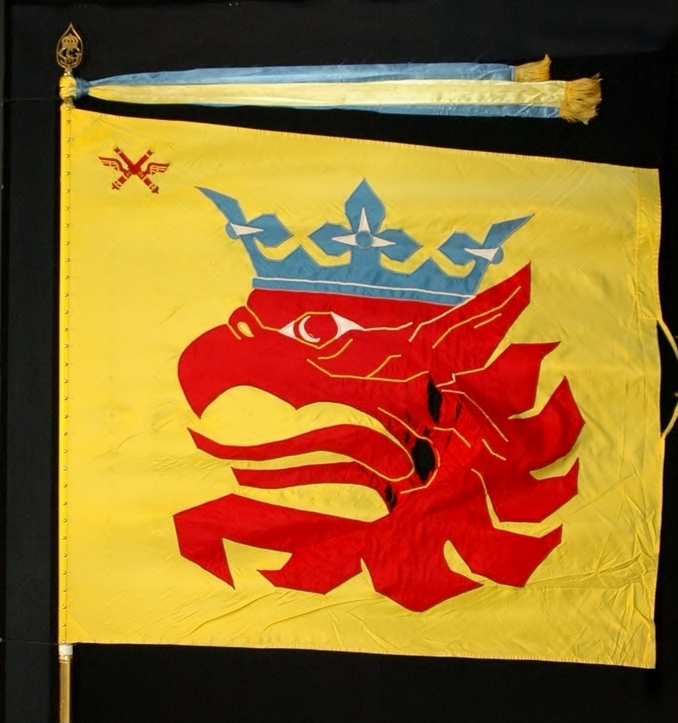
1998 colour

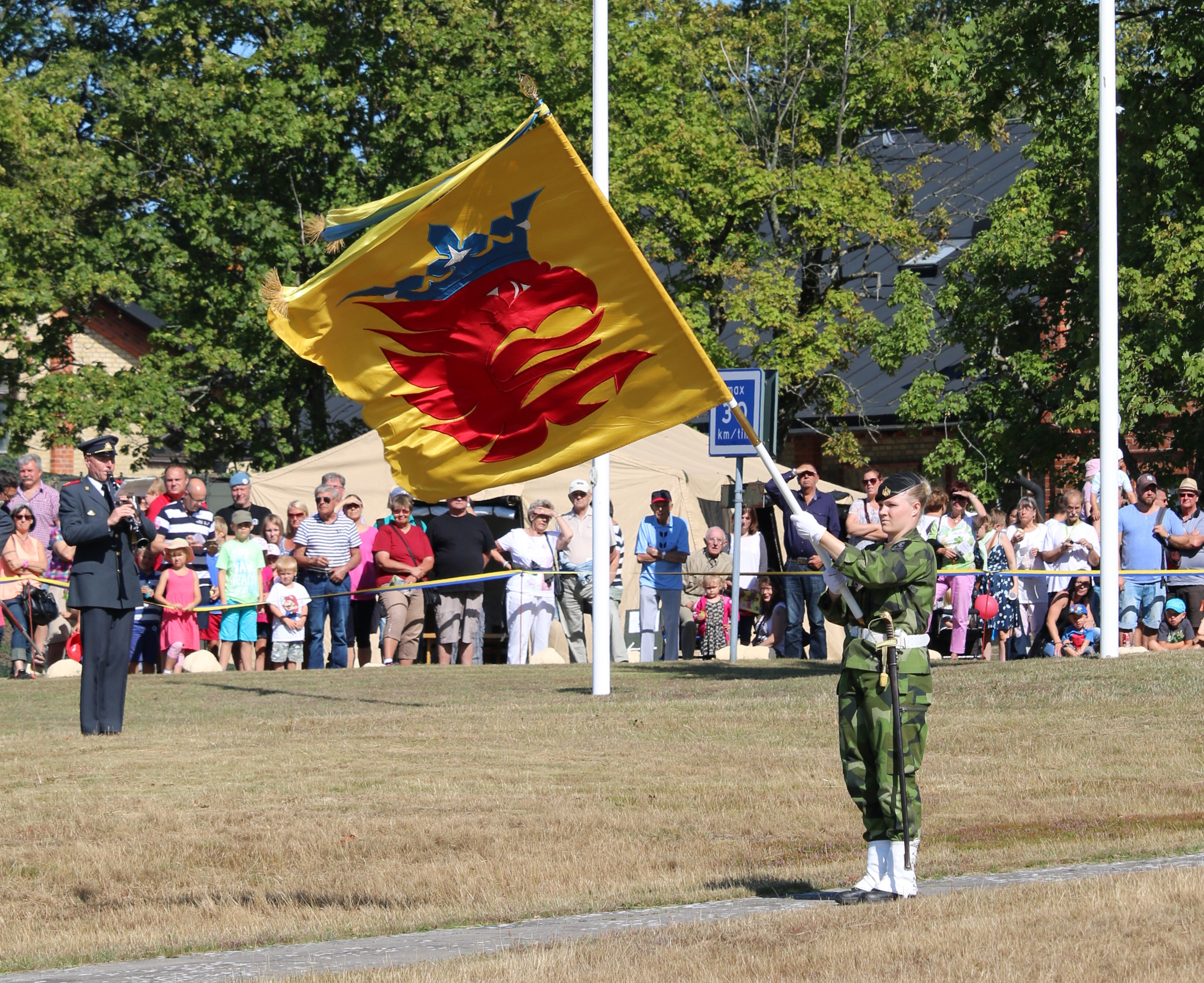
Colour guard

==== Standard of South Scanian Regiment ====
The standard was presented to the former Scanian Dragoon Regiment (Skånska dragonregementet, P 2) at the Stockholm Palace in Stockholm by His Majesty the King Carl XVI Gustaf on 1 October 1992. It was used as regimental standard by P 2 up to 30 June 2000 and then as brigade standard by the Scanian Dragoon Brigade (dragonbrigaden, MekB 8) until 1 July 2000. The standard is drawn by Ingrid Lamby and embroidered by machine in insertion technique by the company Libraria and Gunilla Hjort. Blazon: "On yellow cloth the badge of the regiment; an erazed black head of a griffin with an open red crown. On a black border at the upper side of the standard, battle honours (Lund 1676, Landskrona 1677, Kliszow 1702, Pultusk 1703, Punitz 1704, Fraustadt 1706, Rajovka 1708, Bornhöft 1813) in yellow. Yellow fringe.

=== Coat of arms ===
The coat of the arms of the South Scanian Regiment (P 7/Fo 11) 1977–1994, the South Scania Brigade (Södra skånska brigaden, MekB 7) 1994–2000 and the South Scanian Regiment (P 7) since 2000. Blazon: "Or, the provincial badge of Scania, an erazed head of a griffin gules, with open crown and arms azure. The shield surmounted two arms in fess, embowed and vambraced, the hands holding swords in saltire, or". The coat of arms of the South Scanian Regiment (P 7/Fo 11) 1994–2000 and the South Scania Group (Södra skånska gruppen) since 2000. Blazon: "Or, the provincial badge of Scania, an erazed head of a griffin gules, with an open crown azure. The shield surmounted two swords in saltire or".

Coat of arms of the South Scanian Regiment (P 7/Fo 11) 1977–1994, the South Scania Brigade (Södra skånska brigaden, MekB 7) 1994–2000 and the South Scanian Regiment (P 7) 2000–present.

Coat of the arms of the South Scanian Regiment (P 7/Fo 11) 1994–2000 and the South Scania Group (Södra skånska gruppen) 2000–present.

=== Medals ===
In 1913, the Södra skånska infanteriregementets (I 7) förtjänstmedalj ("South Scanian Infantry Regiment (I 7) Medal of Merit") in gold/silver/bronze (SSkånregGM/SM/BM) of the 12th size was established. Before 1987, it was called Södra skånska regementets och Malmö försvarsområdes förtjänstmedalj ("South Scanian Regiment and Malmö Defence District Medal of Merit") (SödskånregGM/SM/BM) and before 1999 it was called Södra skånska regementets och Södra skånska brigadens förtjänstmedalj ("South Scanian Regiment and South Scanian Brigade") (SödskånregbrigGM/SM/BM). Today it is called Södra skånska regementets (P 7) förtjänstmedalj ("South Scanian Regiment (P 7) Medal of Merit"). The medal ribbon is of yellow moiré with a red stripe on each side.

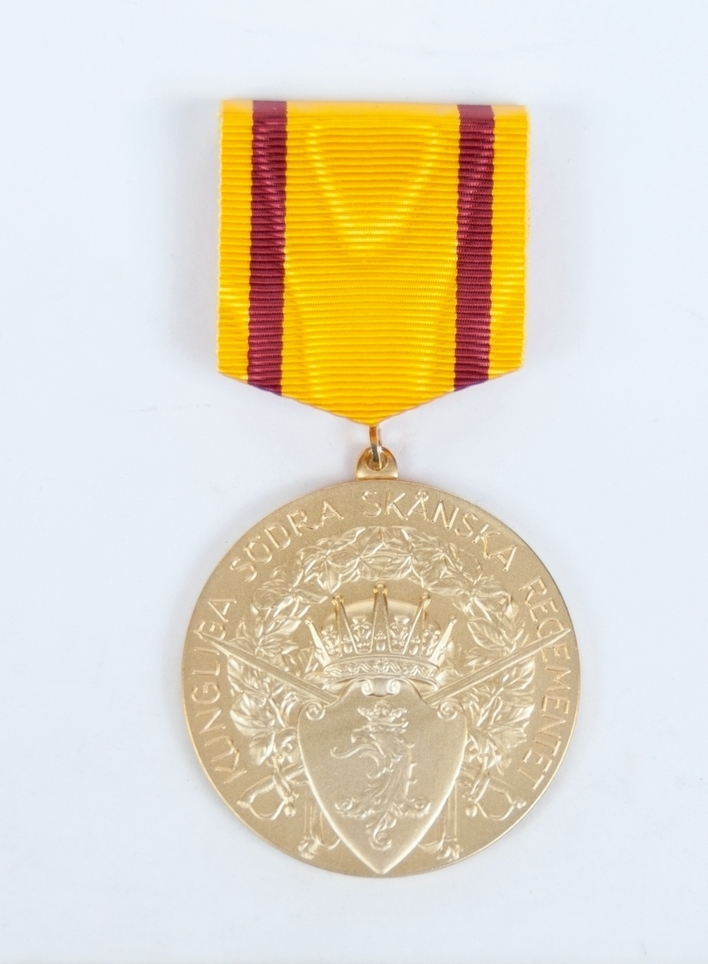
South Scanian Regiment (P 7) Medal of Merit in gold

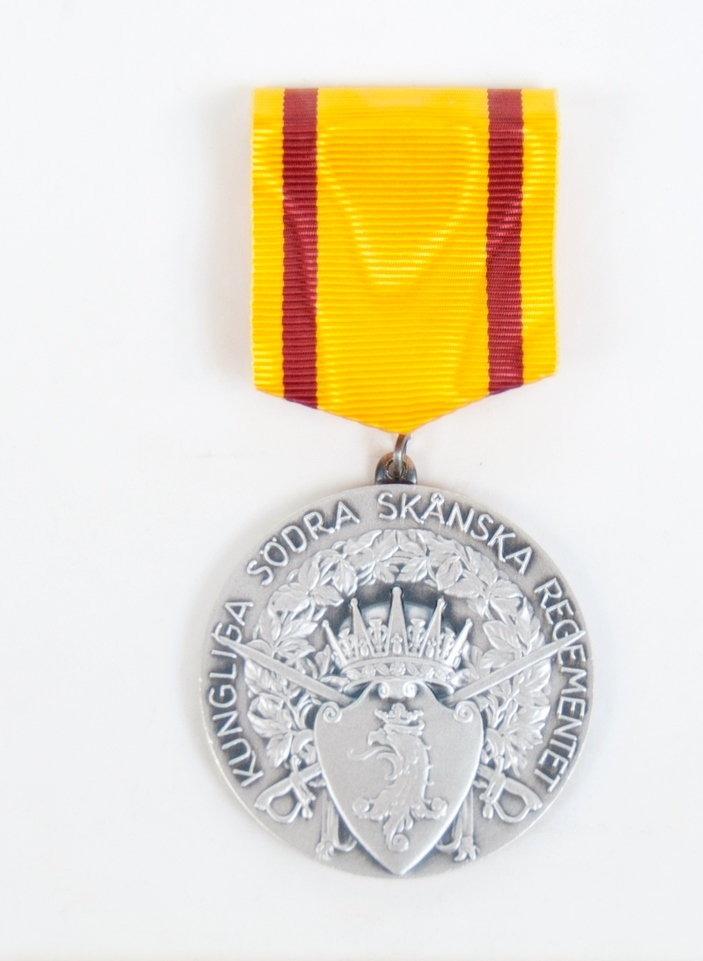
South Scanian Regiment (P 7) Medal of Merit in silver

== Commanding officers ==
Regimental commanders active from when the regiment was organized as an armored unit. For regimental commanders before 1963, see South Scanian Infantry Regiment. For the years 1998-2000, see South Scanian Regiment and South Scanian Brigade

- 1962–1968: Carl Eric Svärd
- 1968–1972: Gösta Hökmark
- 1972–1975: Bertil Green
- 1976–1978: Claes Carlsten
- 1978–1986: Bertil Green
- 1986–1988: Sven-Åke Jansson
- 1988–1995: Gert Nilsson
- 1995–1997: Christer Sterning
- 1997–1997: Gunnar Jansson (acting)
- 1998–2000: See South Scanian Regiment and South Scanian Brigade
- 2000–2004: Anders Emanuelson
- 2004–2007: Lars Hammarlund
- 2007–2011: Jan Pålsson
- 2011–2015: Michael Nilsson (from 2012 also commanding officer (CO) of Military Region South (MR S))
- 2015–2015: Peter Nilsson (also acting CO of MR S) (Note: Nilsson assumed command as acting commanding officer on 3 August 2015, with an appointment as far as until 30 September 2015.)
- 2015–2017: Stefan Smedman (also CO of MR S) (Note: Smedman assumed command as commanding officer on 30 September 2015, with an appointment as far as until 30 September 2019.)
- 2017–2018: Peter Nilsson (also acting CO of MR S in 2017) (Note: Nilsson assumed command as acting commanding officer 1 September 2017, with an appointment as far as until 28 February 2018.)
- 2018–2020: Bo Stennabb (Note: Stennabb assumed command as commanding officer on 1 March 2018, with an appointment as far as until 31 March 2022.)
- 2020–2021: Magnus Olsson (acting)
- 2021–2025: Lennart Widerström
- 2025–20xx: Annelie Olausson

== Names, designations and locations ==
Attributes and locations of the South Skåne Regiment
Name	Translation	From	To
Kungl. Södra skånska regementet	Royal South Scanian Regiment	1 April 1963	31 December 1974
Södra skånska regementet	South Scanian Regiment; South Skåne Regiment	1 January 1975	31 December 1997
Södra skånska regementet	South Scanian Regiment; South Skåne Regiment	1 July 2000	–
Designation		From	To
P 7		1 April 1963	31 December 1975
P 7/Fo 11		1 January 1976	31 December 1997
P 7		1 July 2000	–
Locations		From	To
Ystad Garrison		1 April 1963	31 December 1997
Revingehed		1 July 2000	–

== See also ==
- List of Swedish armoured regiments
