= Jesper Rönndahl =

Swedish stand-up comedian (born 1979)

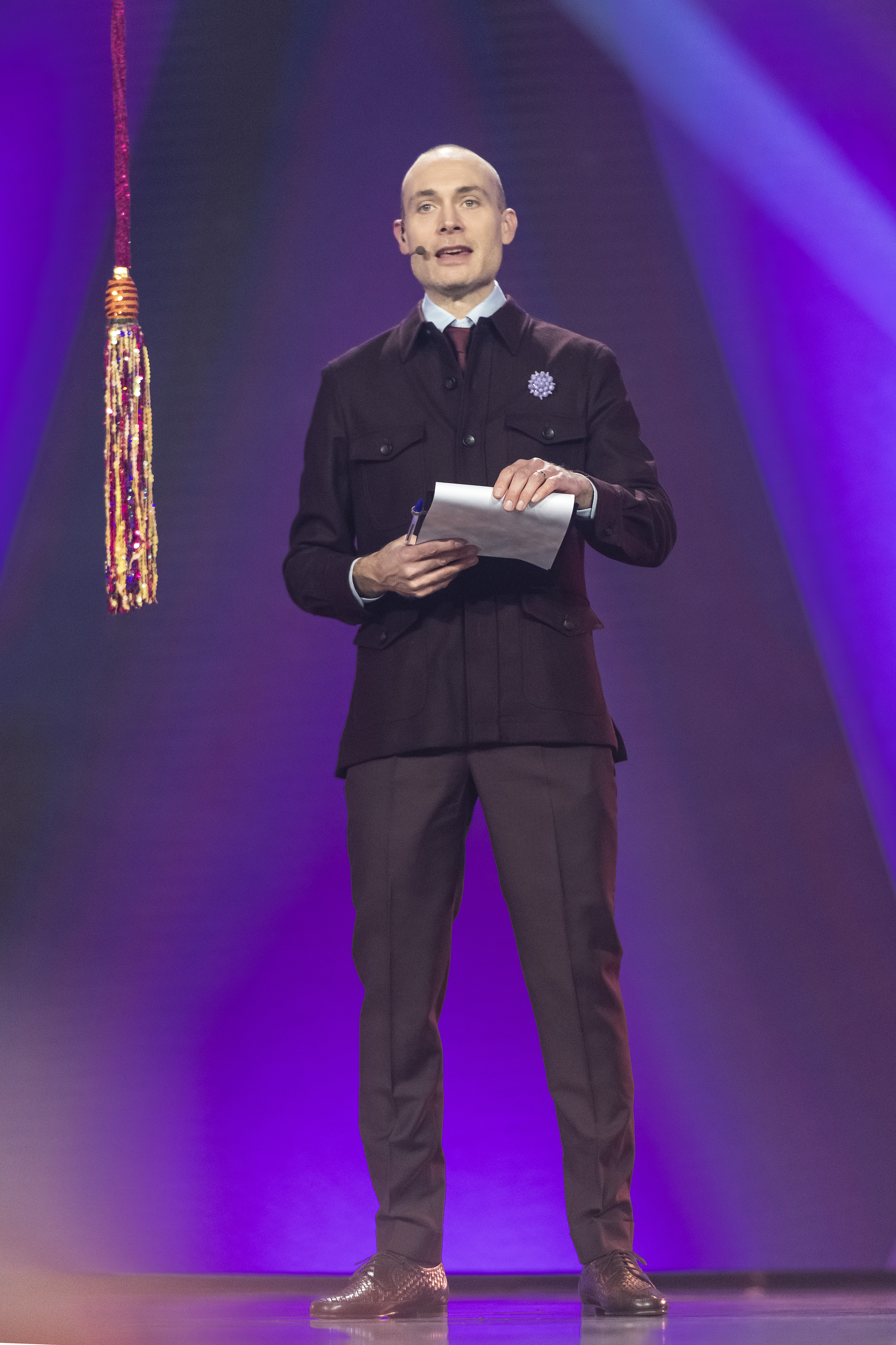
- Rönndahl at Melodifestivalen 2023 in Linköping
- Born: 27 June 1979 (age 47); Veberöd, Skåne County, Sweden

Comedy career
- Years active: 2006–present
- Medium: Stand-up
- Genres: Stand-up, roast, radio, TV
- Website: jesperronndahl.se

Jesper Rönndahl (born 27 June 1979) is a Swedish television presenter, stand-up comedian and radio personality.

== Biography ==
Rönndahl was born and raised in Veberöd, Skåne County and began his career in stand-up comedy in 2006, before appearing regularly on the radio show Pang Prego on Sveriges Radio P3 (SR P3). He also appeared on Hej Domstol!, Morgonpasset, Söndag Hela Veckan and P3 Hiphop.

In 2010, he won the award for best newcomer at the Swedish Stand-up Awards. He previously lived in Malmö, before moving to Stockholm where he currently resides. From 2018 to 2019, he was the presenter of satirical programme Svenska nyheter on SVT1.

Rönndahl hosted Melodifestivalen 2023 along with Farah Abadi.

Rönndahl has starred as a main character on the TV series Dips.

== Controversies ==
=== China incident ===
On 21 September 2018, Svenska Nyheter hosted by Rönndahl broadcast a segment making fun of a Chinese family claiming police mistreatment during a trip to Stockholm, while the end of the segment featured a short "informational film for Chinese tourists" dubbed in Chinese, which featured a variety of perceived racist stereotypes against Asians in Sweden, such as public defecation and dog-meat consumption.
