= Carolina Gynning =

Swedish model, author, podcaster, actress, jewelry designer and television presenter

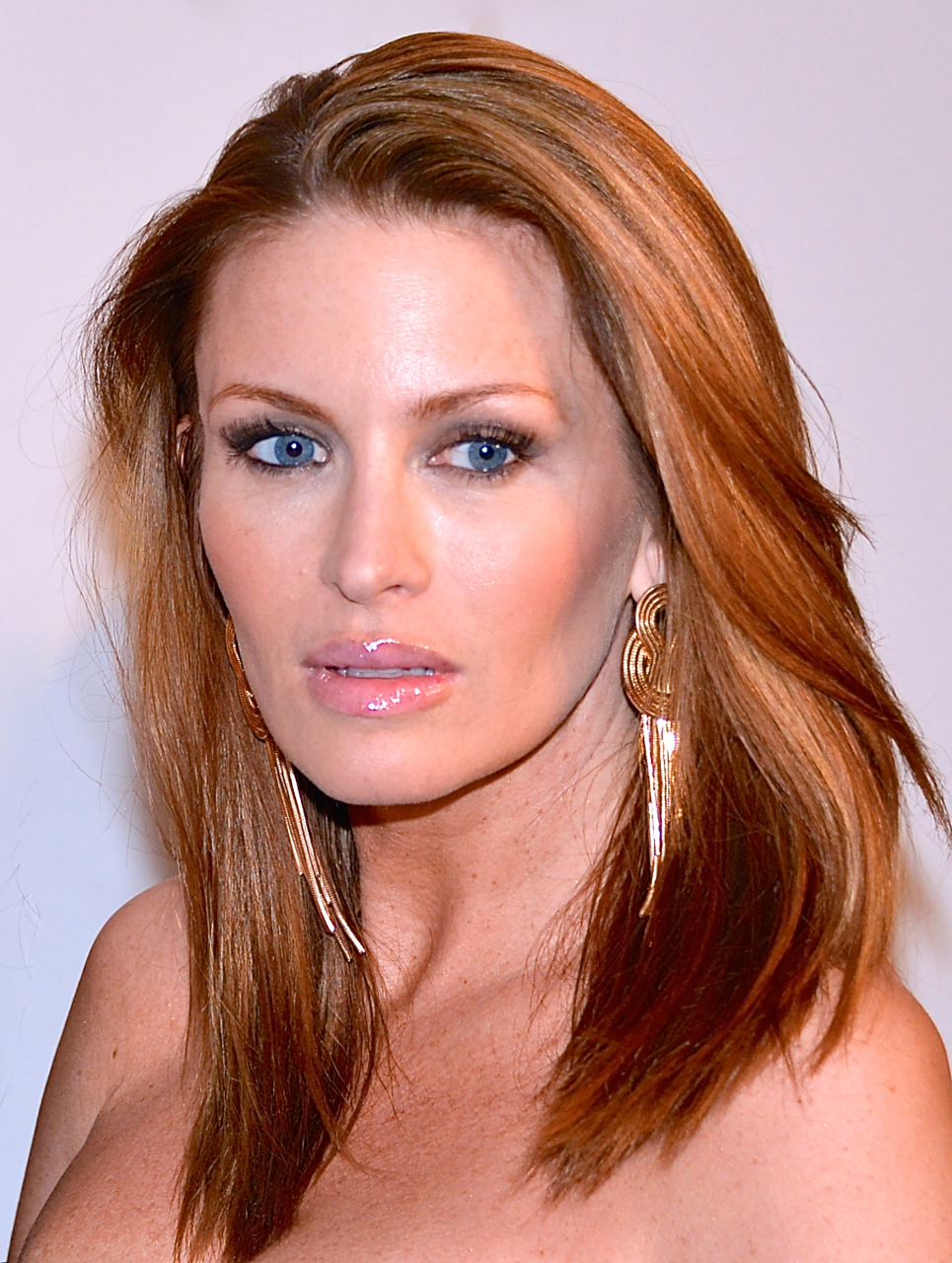
- Gynning in 2013
- Born: 6 October 1978 (age 47); Helsingborg, Sweden
- Occupations: Glamour model, jewelry designer, television presenter, author
- Children: 3
- Website: gynning.net

Carolina Gynning Nilsson (born 6 October 1978) is a Swedish glamour model, author, podcaster, actress, jewelry designer and television presenter. She started her career as a model at age sixteen. She was a participant in the Swedish version of Big Brother in 2004 and emerged as the winner of that season. Gynning has since made a career as a television presenter on TV4 and Kanal5, and also as an artist and author of several books. Gynning has participated in several television shows after Big Brother such as I huvudet på Gynning ("Inside the head of Gynning") and as a celebrity dancer in season one of Let's Dance.

== Childhood and early life ==
Gynning was born in Helsingborg, Sweden and lived in Höganäs for a short time, but spent most of her early years in Falsterbo. She revealed that she was a shy girl but changed when she reached her teens. She attended high school in Lund. At sixteen she was discovered by a fashion photographer while waiting at a bus stop in Falsterbo, and during her high school years she did some modelling assignments on the side. After a while, she landed modeling jobs in international shows in Athens, Milan and Paris. She lived and worked abroad for ten years, mostly as a glamour model. During this time she also underwent breast augmentation surgery.

== Career ==
=== TV personality and host ===
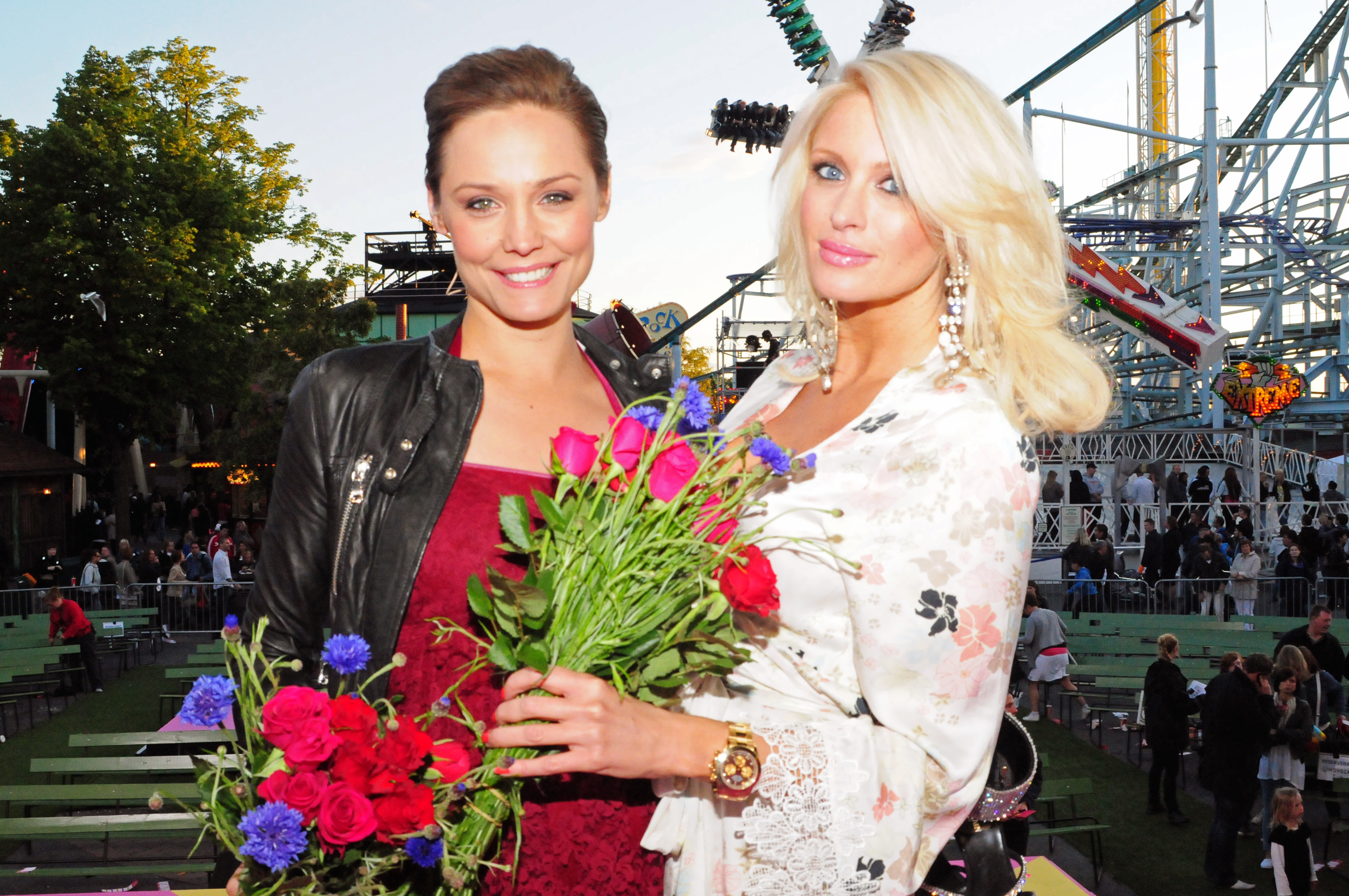
Carina Berg (left) and Gynning in 2009

After a few years working as a glamour model, Gynning was approached by producers of the Swedish version of the reality television show Big Brother and entered the house in January 2004, becoming the season's eventual winner. In 2006, she entered Let's Dance as a celebrity dancer. She appeared on season 1 of the show which was broadcast on TV4. Her dance partner was Daniel da Silva and she was eliminated in the second round. During late 2006 she worked for Viasats Formula 1 show Studio F1 along with Tore Kullgren and simultaneously was one of five hostesses for the TV4 show Förkväll (Tonight"). During 2007, Gynning hosted the audition part of Idol 2007 along with Carina Berg. During 2008, Gynning hosted her own show, I huvudet på Gynning ("Inside Gynning's Head"), which was broadcast on Kanal5; she also hosted the talent show Hitmakers that year on the same channel. During late 2008 she and Carina Berg hosted the TV4 show Stjärnor på is the Swedish version of Stars on Ice. In 2009, Gynning hosted Hjälp! Jag är med i en japansk TV-show ("Help! I am in a Japanese TV Show!") also on TV4 and in the summer of that year hosted Sommarkrysset ("The summer cruise") along with Berg. In 2013 she was one of the celebrity hosts of the radio show Sommar i P1. In 2014, Gynning was scheduled to be one of the judges in the new season of Talang Sverige 2014 ("Talent Sweden") on TV3.

=== Actress ===
A few months before Gynning participated as a housemate in Big Brother, she appeared in the French film Happily Ever After starring Johnny Depp, playing the character "Zoe". In the Jesper Ganslandt-produced film Blondie (2012), Gynning played the leading role alongside Marie Göranzon, Helena af Sandeberg and Alexandra Dahlström.

=== I huvudet på Gynning ===
On 8 February 2008 Gynning released her first music single, "Allt jag tar på blir till guld" ("Everything I touch turns to gold"). In her first television show I huvudet på Gynning, the viewing audience got to see her working on the music video for the song. In the show Gynning created the perfume "Perfect", and launched a commercial for it. In the last episode it was revealed that her perfume would sell in stores. In September 2009, Gynning released her new scent "Go Girl!", becoming the first Swedish woman to have her own perfume and scent.

=== As a writer ===
In 2005, Gynning released her autobiography, Ego Girl, in which she describes how she was discovered as a model at age sixteen and lost herself in a world of sex and drugs before finding herself again. In 2007, mail correspondence between Gynning and Alex Schulman was released as a book.

At the end of 2008 Gynning, together with writer Ingrid Carlqvist, wrote the book Ego Woman, a follow-up to Ego Girl. The book was released by the company Tivoli in 2009.

In 2011, she debuted as a book author herself with the book Laura – flickan från havet (Laura - girl from the sea"), released by Bladh. She got the idea for the book after meeting with author Jens Lapidus. Gynning stated that she wanted to write a book about women who live around Stureplan in Stockholm. She has described the book as a "dirty crime" book. In 2012, the continuation book, Vanessa – flickan i glaskupan ("Vanessa - the girl in the glass dome"), was released.

=== As an artist ===
Gynning has had several exhibitions of her artwork. In April 2009, she hosted a vernissage at Ystad Saltsjöbad. The exhibition was well-received and 15 pieces were sold for between kr1 and 2 million, according to Gynning. Two of the prominent pieces were named Bleeding Barbie and Cat Power. She has also worked with glass and designed a glass collection for the Cervera (se) chain of Swedish homeware stores. She had an art exhibition at Gothia Towers on 21 November 2013, along with her mother Agneta Gynning.

She has recently opened an art studio with her mother under the name Studio Gynning, and has been planning a celebration to mark her ten years anniversary as a professional artist. She is also a jewelry designer. She has also revealed in a newspaper interview that motherhood has affected her art. Her paintings, she has said, are not as dark now as previously, and although in the past she drew mainly portraits, she now paints the whole body. She attributes this to her having become a mother and to her sense that she is now a more complete person.

== Awards ==
Gynning won Swedish tabloid Aftonbladet's TV-award in 2007 for Best Female Television Personality of the Year.

In 2008, Aftonbladet listed Gynning amongst the most powerful people in Sweden, placing her at number 37.

== Removal of silicon implants ==
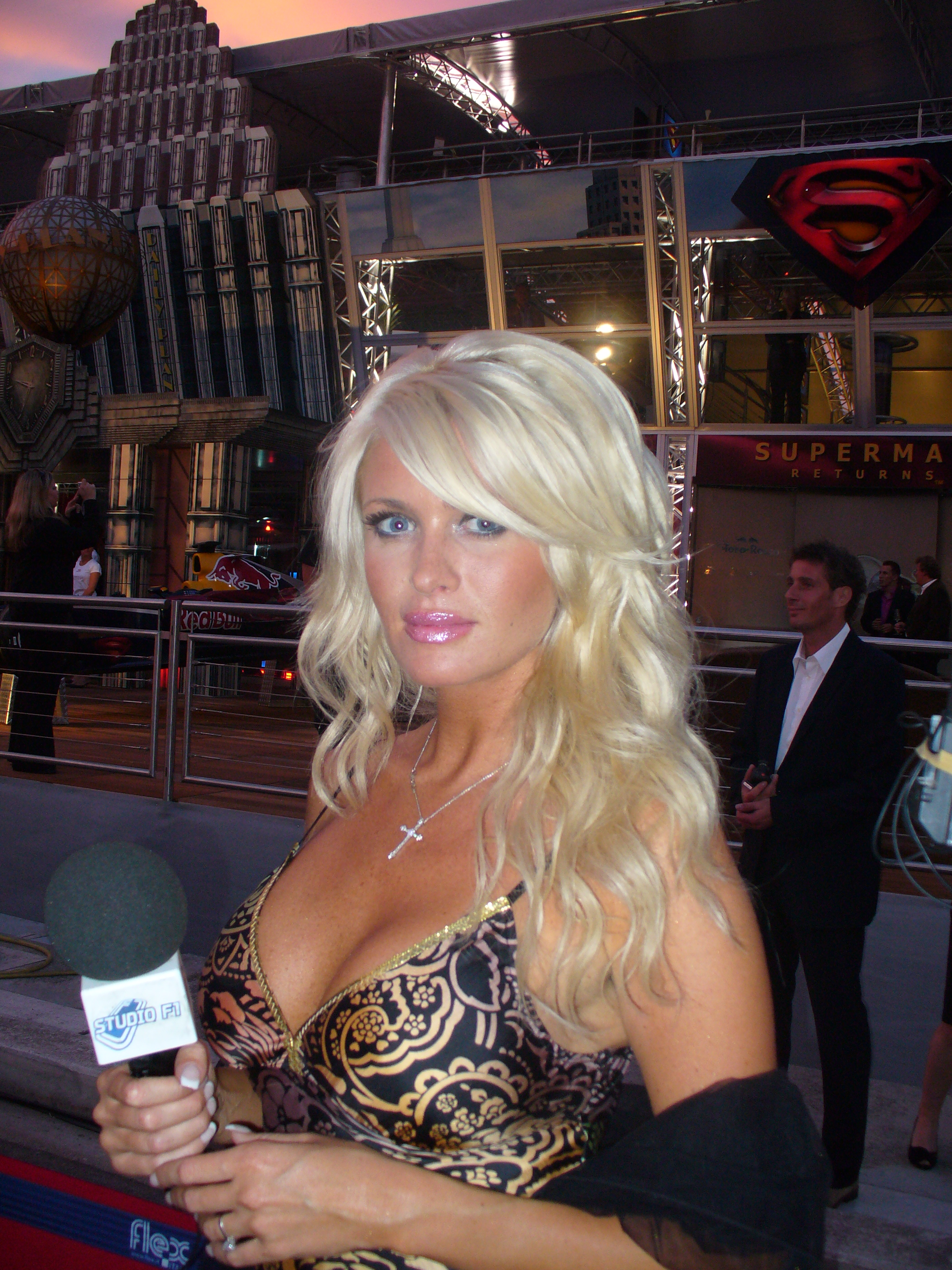
Gynning at the Monaco Grand Prix in 2006 before the implants were removed

In January 2007, Gynning declared to the media that she would remove and sell her breast implants, as she wished to downsize her breasts. In early February 2007, she underwent surgery to remove the implants and Elisabeth Ohlson Wallin took photos of them. The implants were placed in a plexiglass box and sold on the auction site eBay; revenues from the sale were given to a charity that works with victims of the war in Rwanda.

== Personal life ==
Gynning comes from an artistic family. She is the daughter of Agneta Gynning, an artist, and her grandfather's brother was the artist and textile artist Lars Gynning, who studied under Isaac Grünewald.

In 2013, Gynning and her mother opened an art gallery in Malmö.

Gynning lived with Alexander Lydecker, a sales manager. The couple have two daughters and lived in a suburb of Stockholm near the coast. In June 2021, Gynning had her third daughter, with boyfriend Viktor Philipson.

== Work ==
=== Bibliography ===
Year	Program	Notes
2005	Ego Girl ISBN 9789172637306	
2007	Privat: mejlkorrespondens	Jointly with Alex Schulman
2009	Ego Women	Follow-up to Ego Girl

=== Television filmography ===
Year	Program	Notes
2006	Studio F1	Reporter
2006	Förkväll	
2007	Idol 2007	Presenter with Carina Berg
2008	I huvudet på Gynning	
2008	Hitmakers	
2008	Stjärnor på is	
2009	Hjälp! Jag är med i en japansk TV-show	

=== TV presenter filmography ===
Years	Program	Notes
2004	Big Brother	Participants
2005	Fångarna på fortet	Participants
2006	Let's Dance	Participants
2006	45 Minuter	Guest
2006	Studio Virtanen	Guest
2007	Klick	Guest
2007	Roomservice	Guest
2007	Fråga Olle	Guest
2008	Vakna med The Voice	Recurring guest
2008	Lilla Al-Fadji & Co	Guest
2008	Robins	Guest
2008	Videokväll hos Luuk	Guest
2008	Efter tio	Guest
2008	Kobra	Guest
2008	Idol 2008	
2009	Nyhetsmorgon	
2009	Årets tv-tittare	
2009	Grammisgalan	
2009	Hjälp!	
2009	Sommarkrysset	
2014	Talang Sverige 2014	

=== Discography ===
Years	Title
-	"I Will Never Give It Up"
2008	"Allt jag tar på blir till guld"

=== Film ===
Year	Film	Role	Notes
2004	Happily Ever After	Zoe	
2012	Blondie		
2022	Triangle of Sadness	Ludmilla	
