= Der Kommissar und das Meer =

- Country of origin: Germany; Sweden

Der Kommissar und das Meer (Swedish title: Kommissarien och havet) is a German-Swedish television series. It is loosely based on the crime novels by Mari Jungstedt. The series has been broadcast in Germany since 2007 on channels ZDF and Sat.1 emotions.

It has been shown since 2009 by the Swedish channel TV4, and has also been aired in Switzerland and Austria. It will be accessible in the United States in June 2020 on the pay channel MHzChoice.com with simple-to-read English subtitles.
