= Svenska nyheter =

Swedish weekly satirical comedy programme

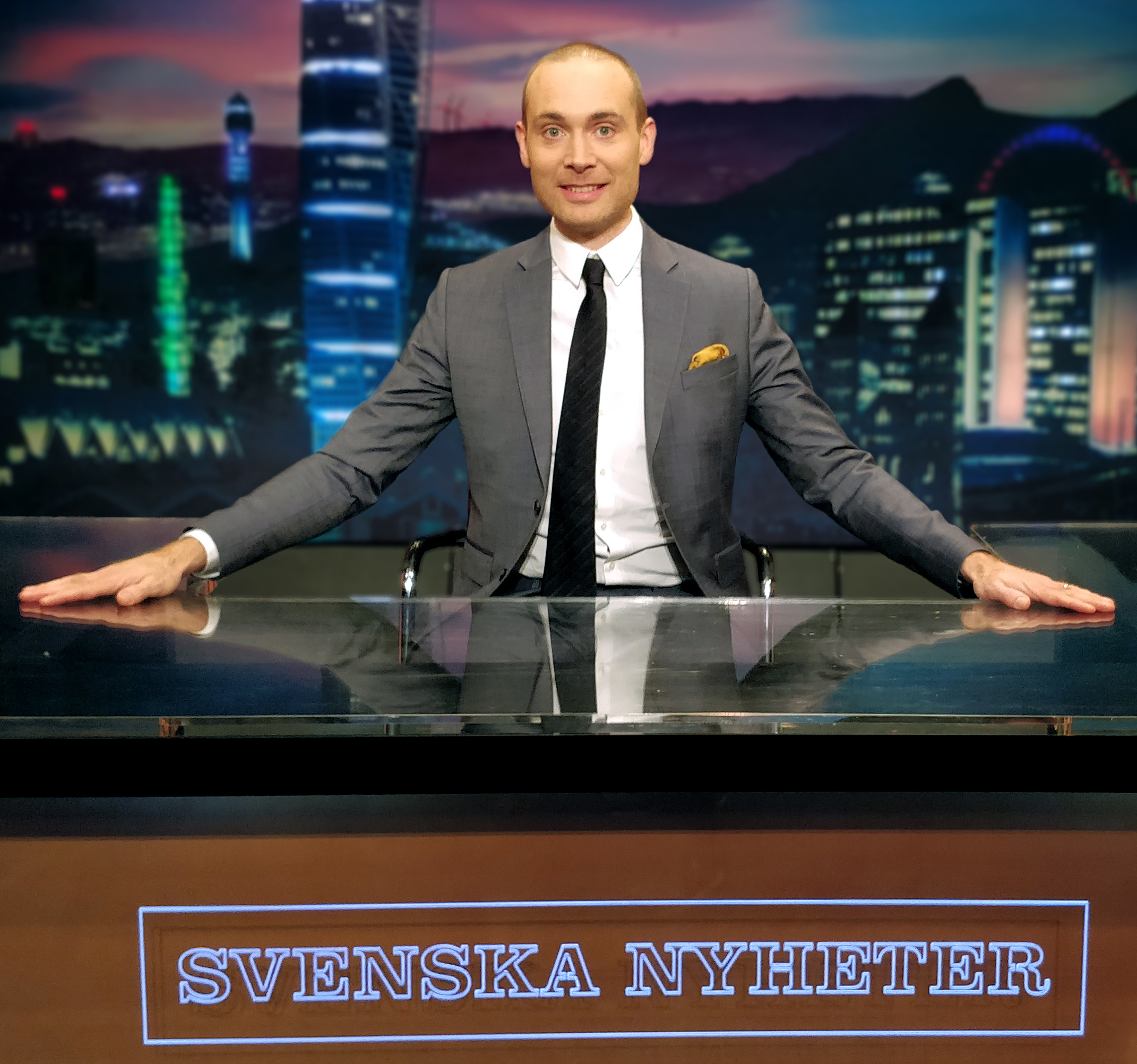
- Jesper Rönndahl during the recording of season 3 of Svenska nyheter in 2019.
- Genre: news, entertainment
- Presented by: Jesper Rönndahl; Kristoffer Appelquist; Messiah Hallberg
- Country of origin: Sweden
- Original language: Swedish
- No. of seasons: 11
- No. of episodes: 104

Production
- Production company: Sveriges television

Original release
- Network: SVT1
- Release: March 9, 2018 – present

Svenska nyheter (Swedish for Swedish News) is a Swedish weekly satirical comedy programme broadcast on SVT1, making fun of that week's latest news stories. The show was hosted by comedian Jesper Rönndahl during season 1 to 3 (2018–2019). Kristoffer Appelquist was the host season 4 to 10 (2019–2022). Messiah Hallberg is the new host beginning with season 11 (2023).

In September 2018, the show received international attention when it made fun of China and Chinese customs.

In October 2022, the show again received international attention when it made fun of Turkish president Recep Erdoğan. The Turkish foreign ministry summoned Sweden's ambassador to Turkey, to provide a complaint about the show's jokes about the president. Sweden had just before applied for NATO membership as protection against a possible invasion by Russia, membership applications must be approved by all members, something Turkey has hesitated on.

== Episodes ==
=== Season 3 (2019) ===
Episode	Topics	Air date
1	New government, Januariavtalet, work tax rates capital tax rates,	
2	Migration politics, organ donation	
3	Yellow vests Sweden, organ donation, climate change, nuclear power	
4	Gambling addiction, death shootings, integration, demographic changes by 2028	
5	Swedish Isis members returning to Sweden	
6	Swedish Isis members returning to Sweden	
7	Isis video follow-up, Postnord (pexit)	
8	Nämndemän, school disciplinary issues	
9		
10	Jesper announces that he will not be host of next season	
