= Revingehed =

Coordinates: 55.69°N 13.47°E

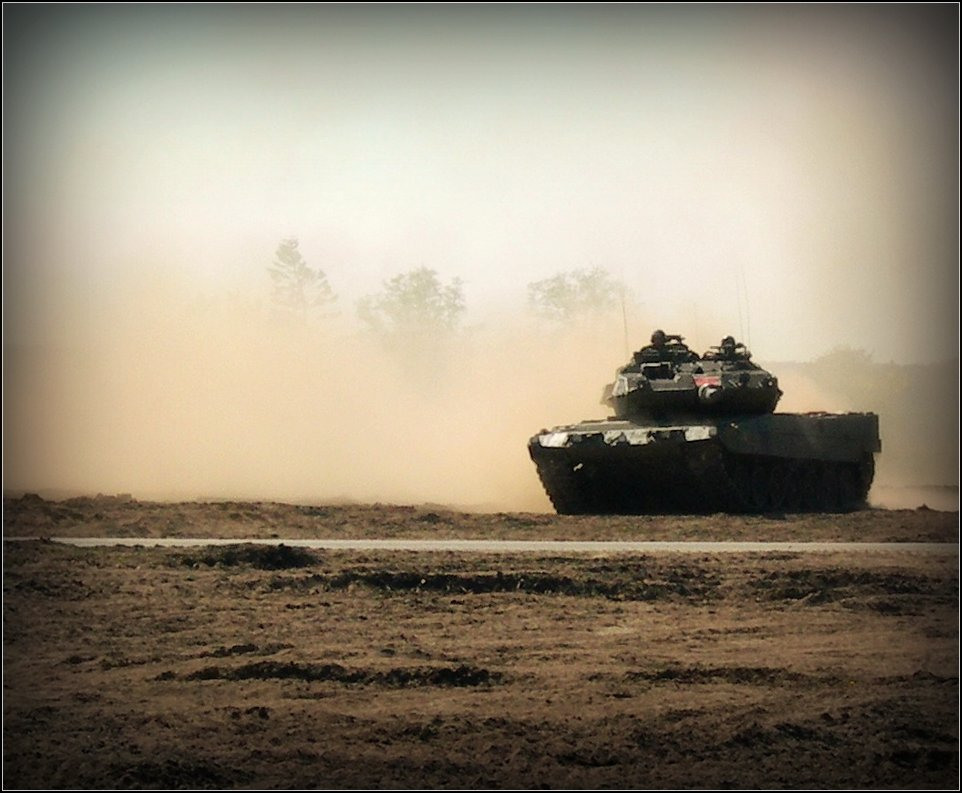
A Stridsvagn 122 at Revingehed in 2007

Revingehed is a military training area located at Revingeby approximately 20 kilometers east of Lund in southern Sweden. Revingehed is one of the largest military training areas in Sweden. It includes 4,600 hectares of forest land and open water. The area is primarily used by the South Scanian Regiment (P 7), which is also located adjacent to the training area.

Revingehed covered approximately 20 hectares in 1887, but was expanded to 100 hectares in 1888. During World War II, the training area was expanded to 1,000 hectares. Since the South Scanian Infantry Regiment (I 7) was reorganized into the armored South Scanian Regiment (P 7), the training area was expanded to 4,400 hectares, and with it became Sweden's largest armor training area. The training area was put into use in 1888 and is often used for large military exercises, but over the years has also been used for other purposes. At the end of World War I, Revingehed had to house foreign prisoners of war waiting for them to return home.
