= Mari Jungstedt =

Swedish journalist and writer

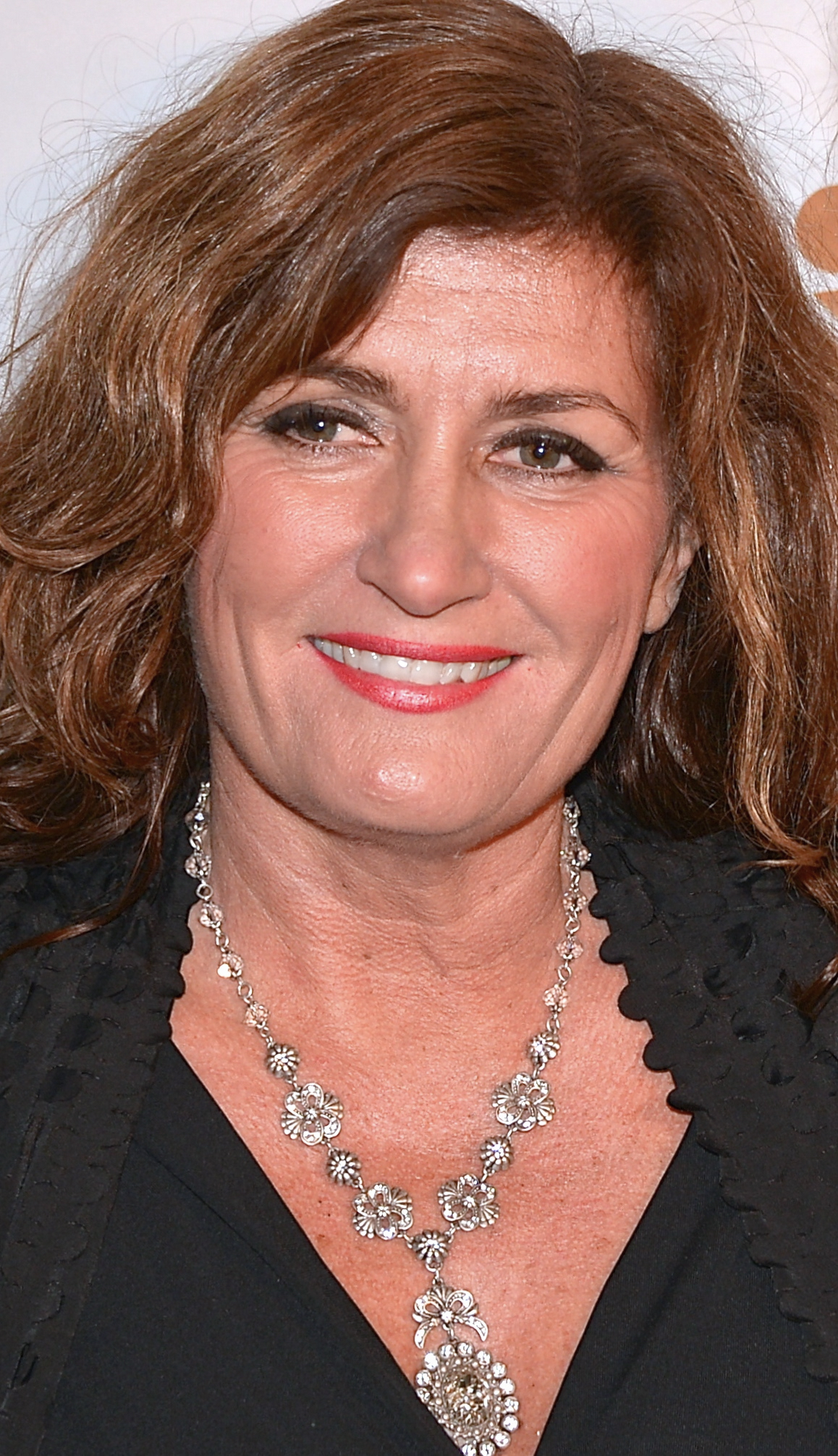
- Mari Jungstedt at Guldbaggegalan 2013
- Born: 31 October 1962 (age 63); Södersjukhuset, Stockholm
- Occupations: Journalist, Novelist
- Writing career
- Genre: Crime fiction
- Website: www.marijungstedt.se

Mari Jungstedt (born 31 October 1962, in Stockholm) is a Swedish journalist and crime fiction author.

Jungstedt worked as a reporter with Swedish national public radio and television, and was an occasional presenter on TV4's daily talk show Förkväll.

Her first five novels are set on the island of Gotland and feature Detective Superintendent Anders Knutas and the journalist Johan Berg. Two of her novels were filmed for Swedish TV, and her work has been translated into English by Tiina Nunnally. In 2012, her book The Dead of Summer was released in America by the publishing house Stockholm Text. Mari Jungstedt lives in Stockholm. Her husband comes from Visby, Gotland, and they spend their summers on Gotland.

== Bibliography ==
- (2003) Den du inte ser; English translation: Unseen (2006)
- (2004) I denna stilla natt; English translation: Unspoken (2007)
- (2005) Den inre kretsen; English translation: The Inner Circle / UK title: Unknown (2008)
- (2006) Den döende dandyn; English translation: The Killer's Art (UK edition 2010, US edition 2013)
- (2007) I denna ljuva sommartid; English translation: The Dead of Summer (UK edition 2011, US edition 2013)
- (2008) Den mörka ängeln; English translation: Dark Angel (UK edition 2012, US edition 2014)
- (2009) Den dubbla tystnaden; English translation: The Double Silence (2013)
- (2010) Den farliga leken; English translation: The Dangerous Game (2014)
- (2011) Det fjärde offret; "The Fourth Victim" (2016)
- (2012) Den sista akten
- (2013) Du går inte ensam

== See also ==
- Der Kommissar und das Meer (since 2007, TV series)
