= Förkväll =

Swedish television program

- Genre: Talk show
- Country of origin: Sweden
- Original language: Swedish

Original release
- Network: TV4
- Release: 2006 – 2007
- Release: 2009 – 2011

Förkväll (2006–2007, 2009–2011) was a Swedish daily talk show that started airing in 2006 on TV4. The show ran until January 2011 before it was cancelled.

Förkväll focused on lifestyle and popular culture and is an attempt to compete with the SVT show Gokväll, but for a younger demographic.

For the first season, the hosts were the model and reality show star Carolina Gynning, singer and actress Kayo Shekoni, journalist Alexandra Pascalidou, comedian and radio show host Carina Berg and author Mari Jungstedt. In the first two seasons the program was broadcast live from Stockholm Central Station. Among the guests have been Victoria Silvstedt, Kjell Bergqvist, Helena Bergström, Andreas Wilson, Anna Book, Måns Zelmerlöw as well as internationally acclaimed stars such as Irish boy band Westlife.

On 23 March 2007 it was revealed that TV4 was about to cancel Förkväll after its season finale the same day. TV4 got a storm of emails and phone calls from angry viewers and TV4 told Swedish newspapers Aftonbladet and Expressen that they were instead planning a third season later that year. On 24 May the decision was made to cancel Förkväll. The reason was economical and that Carolina Gynning did not want to continue with the talk show. Carolina Gynning and Carina Berg were to host the audition part of Idol 2007 in Sweden.

The talk show started airing again on 12 October 2009 live from "Radisson Blu Royal Viking Hotel" in Stockholm with Elisabet Höglund, Yvonne Ryding and Carin da Silva as host. In February 2010 Elisabet Höglund left the program and was replaced by Carolina Gynning, in week 12 same year she temporarily replace by Agneta Sjödin and Hans Fahlén. In the next season, starting 4 October 2010, the program hosts were replaced by Agneta Sjödin, Carolina Gynning, Hans Fahlén, Adam Alsing and Linda Lindorff.

== Breast implant story ==
Carolina Gynning returned to hosting Förkväll on 16 February 2007 after a week of absence and recovery following removal of her breast implants. The removed implants were displayed to the viewers on air and her co-hosts expressed their amazement on the impact the operation had made on her. Carolina is now to sell the implants on eBay and give the money to charity, she also says she wants to become a real role model for young women in Sweden.
