= Carina Berg =

Swedish comedian and television presenter (born 1977)

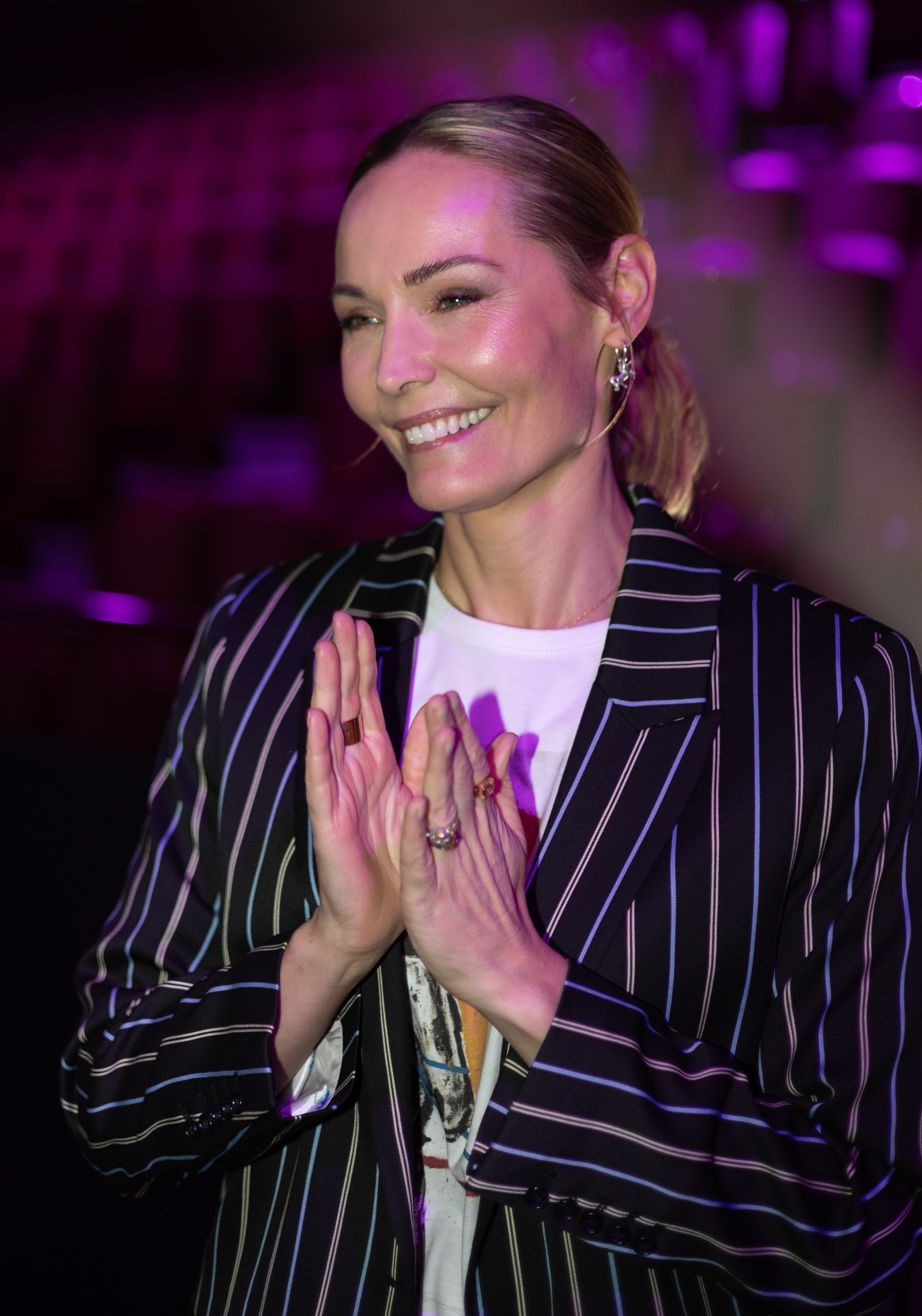
- Berg in 2024
- Born: Carina Lilly Berg; 11 November 1977 (age 48); Åkersberga, Sweden
- Occupations: Television presenter; radio talk-show host
- Spouses: Kristian Luuk (m. 2008; div. 2016) Erik Johansson (m. 2018)
- Children: 3

Carina Lilly Berg (previously Luuk; born 11 November 1977) is a Swedish comedian and television presenter. Berg grew up in Åkersberga, studied the aesthetics program at Danderyds gymnasium and then went on to study radio at Kaggeholms folkhögskola. She used to be married to and has a son with Kristian Luuk, whom she met in 2005 when they shared presenter duties for the TV4 show God natt, Sverige, Berg's television debut. Along with Christine Meltzer she won a Kristallen-award in 2015 for "Best female television presenter".

== Early life ==
Carina Lilly Berg was born on 11 November 1977 in Åkersberga, Sweden.

== Career ==
=== Radio career ===
Berg began her media career at radio after finishing her studies, she started at Sveriges Radios local station in Västernorrland and then progressed to presenting Morgonpasset for Sveriges Radio P3 along with Peter Erixon between 2003 and 2005. She was also a sidekick in the radio show Lantz i P3 with Annika Lantz. In 2008 and early 2009 she worked for Mix Megapol on the show Äntligen helg med Breitholtz och Berg along with Daniel Breitholtz.

In 2010 and early 2011, she worked on podcasting along with Breitholtz for the magazine Yourlife. Along with Jenny Strömstedt she did the podcast broadcast Strömstedt & Berg for TV4.se and TV4 Play.

=== TV career ===
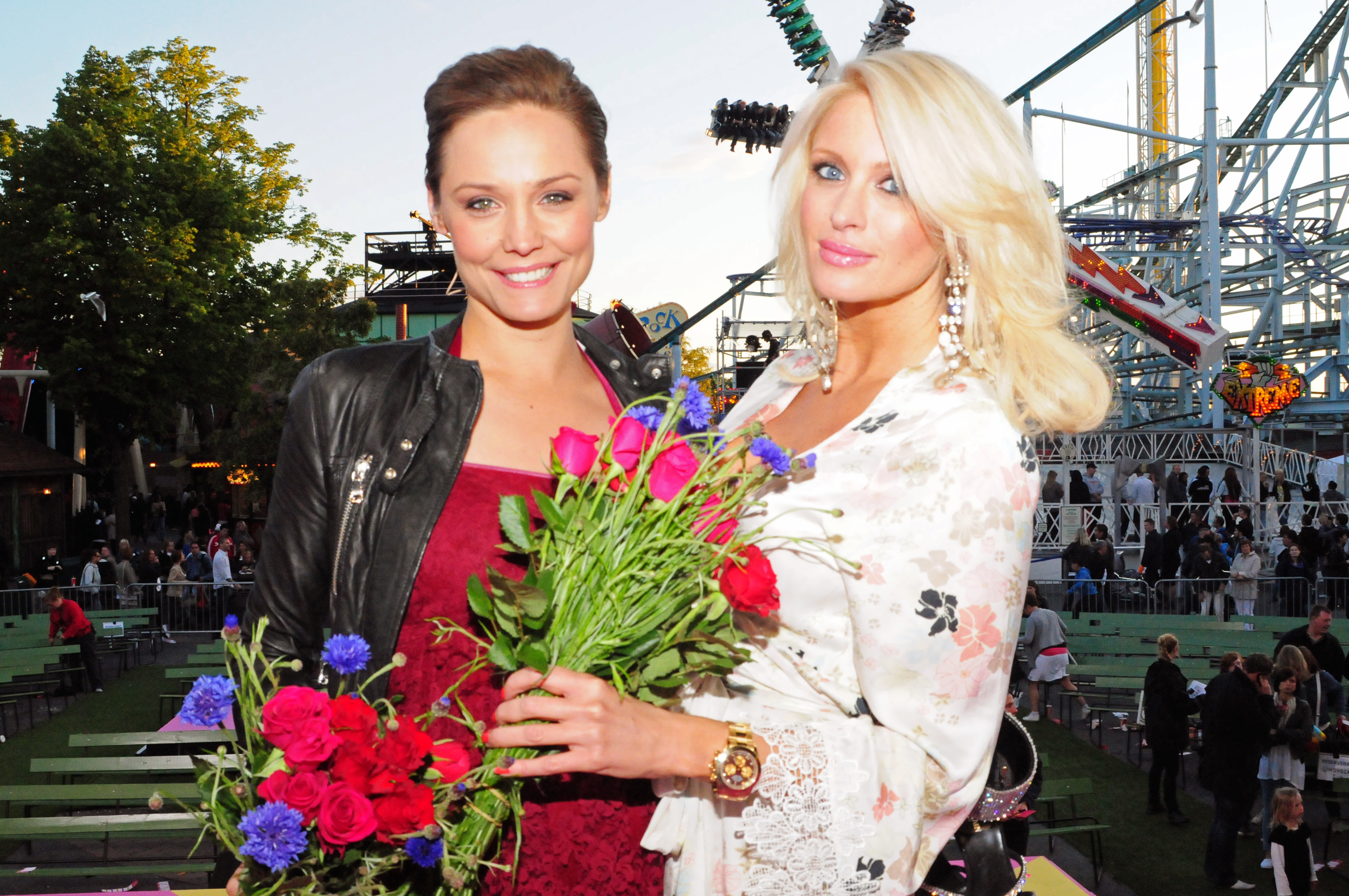
Carina Berg and Carolina Gynning at Grönan during Sommarkrysset 2009.

After making her unofficial television debut in 2004 as a disabled reporter for CP-magasinet at SVT and her later role in God natt, Sverige, Berg in 2006 presented the comedy show Lilla vi (tar stor plats...) on TV4.

In 2007, she presented Förkväll at the same channel. During late 2007 she presented Idol 2007 along with Carolina Gynning, they presented the audition part of the show. In 2008 the duo presented Stjärnor på is at TV4. The same year she was voted "Best female television presenter" during a vote by fourteen TV-bosses for Aftonbladet.

In 2009, she presented the show Snillen snackar on Kanal5. Berg presented the celebrity show Berg flyttar in for five seasons, in every episode she moved into different celebrities homes during a few days. The show aired between 2008 and 2012.

After this show Berg decided to start working permanently for Kanal5. There she presented The Voice in 2012, and in 2013 she presented the talk show Bergs bärbara talkshow. In 2014 she and Christine Meltzer presented the show Berg & Meltzer i Amerika were the duo traveled through the USA for two months and visits interesting personalities. The show got a second season in 2015 where the duo travels through European countries.

In 2019 and 2020, Berg and her second husband footballer Erik Berg took part in the reality series Bergs drömkåk, which was broadcast on Kanal5.

In 2024, she hosted Melodifestivalen, the Swedish selection for the Eurovision Song Contest.

In 2025, Berg joined the fifth season of Masked Singer Sverige which is broadcast on TV4.

== Personal life ==
Carina Berg married her colleague and fellow TV presenter Kristian Luuk in 2008; the couple divorced in 2017. They have a son together. In 2018, Berg married footballer Erik Berg. The couple have son, born in December 2019, and a daughter, born in March 2021.

== Television work ==
- 2004 – CP-magasinet
- 2005 – God natt, Sverige
- 2006 – Lilla vi (tar stor plats...)
- 2006–2007 – Förkväll
- 2007 – Idol 2007
- 2008 – Stjärnor på is
- 2008–2012 – Berg flyttar in
- 2009 – Snillen snackar
- 2012 – The Voice
- 2013 – Bergs bärbara talkshow
- 2014 – Berg & Meltzer i Amerika
- 2015 – Berg & Meltzer i Europa
- 2015 – Ett jobb för Berg
- 2019–2020 – Bergs drömkåk
- 2024 – Melodifestivalen 2024
