= Kristian Luuk =

Swedish comedian and television presenter (born 1966)

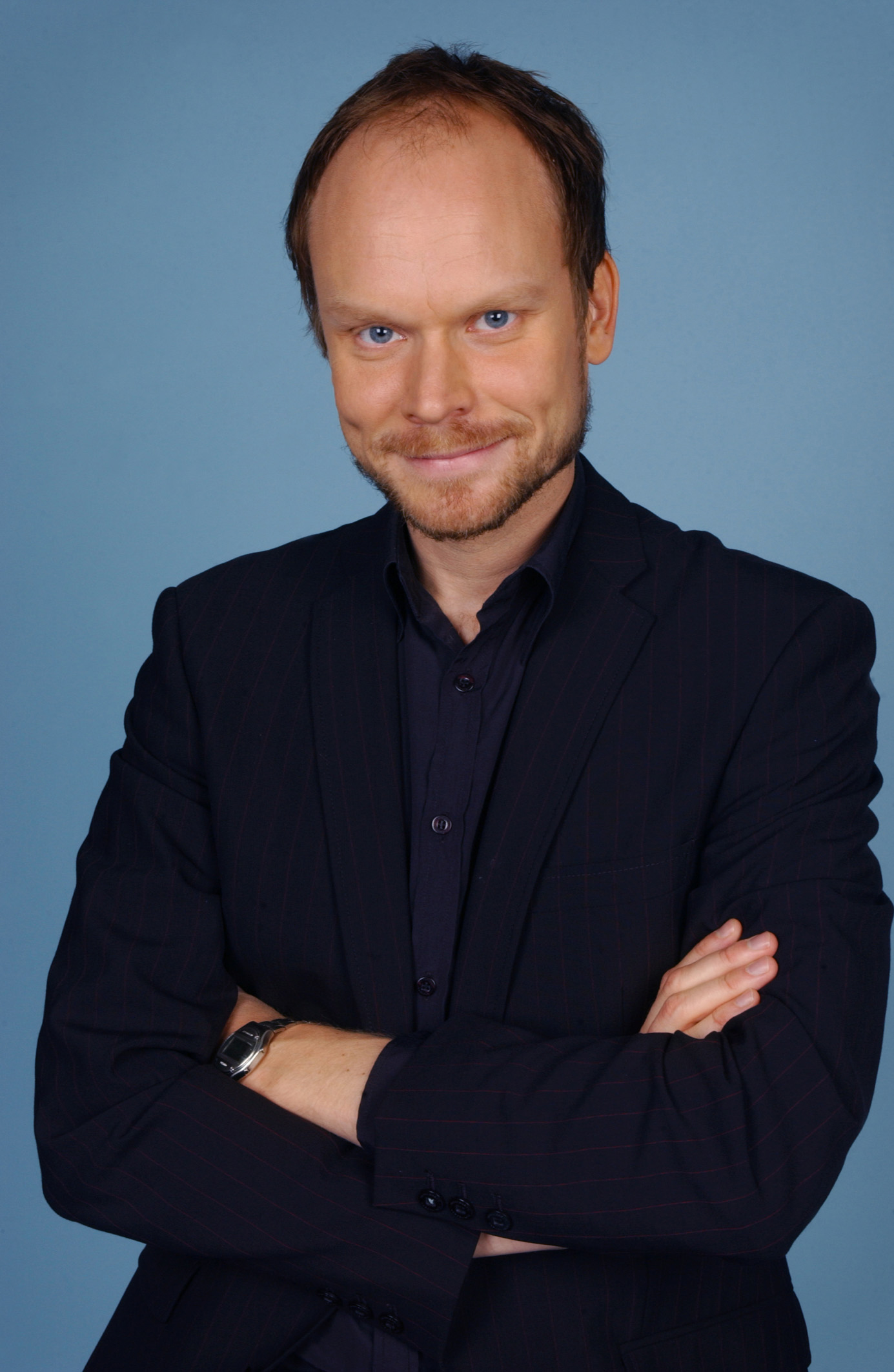
- Kristian Luuk in 2004
- Born: 14 June 1966 (age 60); Stockholm, Sweden
- Education: Handelshögskolan
- Occupation: Television presenter
- Years active: 1996–present
- Known for: Sen kväll med Luuk (Late evening with Luuk); På spåret (On the line)
- Spouse: Carina Berg (m. 2008; div. 2016)
- Children: 3

Ants Robert Kristian Luuk (born 14 June 1966) is a Swedish comedian and television presenter. He has presented several shows such as Sen kväll med Luuk, Melodifestivalen and På spåret.

== Early life ==
Luuk was born to Estonian immigrant parents. For the first few years in Sweden he and his family lived in Sätra in Stockholm, but in 1970 they moved to Skärholmen. His father worked for IBM, and during three years at the end of the 1970s the family lived in California, USA. Luuk studied at Estniska skolan in Stockholm, and his high school studies took place at Åva gymnasium in Täby. He studied business and economics at Handelshögskolan in Stockholm, where he started getting involved in the student- and local radio. His younger brother is Martin Luuk, a writer and member of the Swedish comedy group Killinggänget.

== Career ==
For the larger audience he became known for the radio show Hassan at Sveriges Radio and Knesset at ZTV. In 1996 he started working in television at TV4 where he presented his own talk show Sen kväll med Luuk. The talk show lasted until 2004. In early 2005, he started presenting God natt, Sverige along with his then wife Carina Berg. The show was cancelled after just one season and Luuk left TV4 after that. With the help of Peter Settman Luuk got work at SVT and in late 2007 he presented the show Videokväll hos Luuk.

Luuk acted in the film Känd från TV in 2001 in a supporting role, the film was directed by Fredrik Lindström. He presented Melodifestivalen 2007 and Melodifestivalen 2008 on SVT, Sweden's pre-selection for the Eurovision Song Contest.

In 2009, Luuk became the presenter of the popular entertainment show På spåret (along with Fredrik Lindström), after the previous presenter Ingvar Oldsberg left the show. He presented the reality series Maestro in 2011 for SVT.

In 2012 he presented the podradio show Luuk & Lokko along with his childhood friend Andres Lokko.

== Personal life ==
Luuk was married to fellow television presenter Carina Berg. The couple has one son. Luuk also has two children from previous relationships. On October 7, 2016, it was announced that Luuk and Berg were getting a divorce.

== Radio, TV and Film ==
=== Radio ===
- Hassan i P3, 1993 - 1994, Sveriges Radio
- Sommar i P1, presenter 26 June 1996 and 18 July 2009
- Luuk & Lokko, 2012, Sveriges Radio

=== Talk shows ===
- Knesset, 1995, ZTV
- Sen kväll med Luuk, 1996 - 2004, TV4
- God natt, Sverige, 2005, TV4
- Videokväll hos Luuk, 2007 - 2008, SVT

=== Presenter ===
- Melodifestivalen 2007 och 2008, SVT
- På spåret, 2009–present, SVT
- Maestro, 2011, SVT
- Veckans ord med Kristian Luuk, 2021, SVT

=== Film ===
- Känd från TV, 2001, directed by Fredrik Lindström.

=== Television ===
- Dips, 2018–
