= Stjärnor på is =

- Genre: entertainment
- Country of origin: Sweden
- Original language: Swedish

Original release
- Network: TV4
- Release: 2008 – 2008

Stjärnor på is is a celebrity ice skating show which was broadcast on TV4 in 2008. Carina Berg and Carolina Gynning presented the show.
