= Hitmakers (TV series) =

Scandinavian reality television competition for songwriters

Hitmakers was a Scandinavian reality television program for music competition which aired on Swedish Kanal 5 television channel in Spring 2008 with the premiere broadcast on Sunday, April 6, 2008. It was hosted by Carolina Gynning.

The program aimed to find the next winning songwriter and was produced by Meter Film & Television and was open to contestants from Sweden, Norway and Denmark. Judges came from various record companies in the three countries. Lesser-known artists presented their own composition on condition that they have not been released yet on an album and they would get answers within a few weeks whether the song presented had any hit appeal, with a potential release of the song by one of the represented record companies.

Thousands of songs were presented for screening to a selection committee. When a song has been put through, they get an audience in front of the five professional judges. If the song gets no offers, it is eliminated. If a song gets just one offer, it is reserved for use by that record label. When more than one representative picks a particular song, a bid is initiated with the higher bidder getting to sign the artist concerned.
