= Dips (TV series) =

2018 Swedish comedy series by Jesper Rönndahl and Marie Agerhäll

- Genre: Comedy, satire
- Created by: Jesper Rönndahl; Marie Agerhäll
- Written by: Jesper Rönndahl; Marie Agerhäll
- Directed by: Marie Agerhäll
- Starring: Jesper Rönndahl Marie Agerhäll; Moa Lundqvist; Kristian Luuk Mads Korsgaard
- Theme music composer: Hugo Alfvén
- Opening theme: Roslagsvår sung by Orphei Drängar
- Ending theme: Roslagsvår sung by Orphei Drängar
- Country of origin: Sweden
- Original language: Swedish
- No. of seasons: 2
- No. of episodes: 12

Production
- Producer: Marie Agerhäll
- Cinematography: Lukas Backland; Daniel Gartmo
- Running time: approx. 20 min.
- Production company: Allvarliga Produktioner AB

Original release
- Network: SVT Play
- Release: 24 December – 24 December 2018

Dips is a Swedish comedy series by Jesper Rönndahl and Marie Agerhäll. It was produced by APAB for SVT. All episodes of the first season were published on SVT Play on 24 December 2018.

The series is about the "dips" in-training Jens Stråhle (Jesper Rönndahl) and Fanny Båtsman (Moa Lundqvist), who are interns at the Protocol Division at the Ministry for Foreign Affairs, and their mentor Mimmi Hamillton (Marie Agerhäll). Frequently appearing is also the administration director-general Hendrik Tür (Kristian Luuk).

According to the creators Jesper Rönndahl and Marie Agerhäll, much in the series is based on reality and material they have got when they have both "gone undercover and interviewed people on both the floor and at the top secretly". The material is however altered as the series is not a documentary.

In late October 2019, Jesper Rönndahl announced that a season two was on its way.

== Cast and characters ==
- Jens Stråhle (Jesper Rönndahl) is the son of a prominent Swedish diplomat. He spent much of his early life abroad and has thus been spoiled by the extended diplomatic immunity from his father. While being socially competent and a skilled speaker, he lacks knowledge about the larger subjects such a women's right and social equality.
- Fanny Båtsman (Moa Lundqvist) is very knowledgeable about foreign affairs and current events. However, this is not always clear as she is both pushy and dogmatic. She shares last name with the fictional dog Båtsman, but her family carried the name first.
- Mimmi Hamillton (Marie Agerhäll) has made a "horizontal career" at the ministry and is responsible for Jens and Fanny. She is well-versed in the inner workings of the ministry but lacks the necessary organizational skills to do her job.
- Hendrik Tür (Kristian Luuk) is the administration director-general of the ministry and is Jens, Fanny, and Mimmi's superior. He is also the godson to Jens' father.

== Episodes ==
Episode	Name	(Translated)	Description	Length
1	Svensk-kinesiskt pang-pang	Swedish-Chinese bang-bang	It is the first day for Jens' and Fanny's internship at the Ministry for Foreign Affairs. The main event of the day is the sale negotiations with China about the Swedish cluster bomb Mjölner. Sweden is circumventing the CCM Treaty by removing the explosive components. Fanny is delegated to collect the Chinese representatives' wives at the airport (despite not having a driver's license), and Jens is tasked with buying a gift for the delegation. Mimmi agrees to take the blame for a mis-sent dick-pic in exchange for a position in Washington.	22 min
2	Diplomatisk immunitet	Diplomatic immunity	A minor crisis occurs when a British diplomat is stopped and then let go for driving under the influence, then later crashes with a motor boat into Stockholm Marathon. Jens and Fanny are introduced to the ministry's unofficial "shame list" for foreign diplomats, and are then tasked with reprimanding said diplomat. Mimmi exchanges her Washington position for a position in Rome, and has to explain the dick-pic to her boss.	16 min
3	Rysskräcken	The Russian Fear	A Russian submarine travels in the international water between the Swedish territories of Öland and Gotland which is provocative. Jens accidentally makes an official statement to a journalist and then blames it on Fanny. Mimmi has to send a full-body photo to Rome.	21 min
4	Tjejpolitik och Jemen	Girl Politics and Yemen	The theme of the day at the Foreign Ministry is Feminist Foreign Policies, the day ends with a mingle for which Mimmi is responsible. Jens and Fanny take part in a seminar about feminism and are then tasked with preparing for the "Women in Yemen" meeting.	21 min
5	Comfort women	Comfort Women	Sweden has managed to get Japan and the Philippines to the table regarding the issue of comfort women. Jens and Mimmi take care of the flower arrangements and prepare the negotiation room, and Fanny takes the delegations' wives for a visit to the Vasa Museum.	21 min
6	Dansk-svenska flyktingförhandlingen	Danish-Swedish Refugee Negotiations	Sweden and Denmark are negotiating the distribution of refugees between the two countries. Fanny is offered a position in New York from a racist Danish diplomat. Later Jens and Fanny sit through a lesson about the freedom of information laws and how to circumvent them.	19 min

== Reviews and rewards ==
A review by Hanna Persson at Nöjesguiden commented that "after some [previous] questionable purchases by SVT", Dips is "smart-fun with political awareness and stupid-fun with misspelled SMS – at the same time". She described the serie as being about "really annoying people who also happen to be totally incompetent but at the same time work at the Ministry of Foreign Affairs."

In 2019 Dips was SVT's nomination for Kristallen category Humor program of the year, but lost to TV4 AB's Enkelstöten. In September 2019 it won The Swedish Humor Prize's Comedy of the Year award during the Childhood Cancer Gala.

Awards and nominations for Dips
Award	Date of ceremony	Category	Result
Kristallen 2019	30 August 2019	Humor program of the year	Nominated
Childhood Cancer Gala 2019	30 September 2019	Comedy of the Year	Won
