= Sen kväll med Luuk =

- Also known as: En kväll med Luuk
- Genre: Talk show
- Created by: Kristian Luuk
- Based on: Late Night with Conan O'Brien
- Written by: Per Forssberg, Josef Sterzenbach
- Directed by: Per Forssberg, Sven Stojanović
- Starring: Kristian Luuk, Felix Herngren
- Opening theme: Yester-Me, Yester-You, Yesterday
- Composers: Ron Miller, Bryan Wells
- Country of origin: Sweden
- Original language: Swedish
- No. of seasons: 15
- No. of episodes: 146

Production
- Producer: Per Blankens
- Production company: EFTI

Original release
- Network: TV4
- Release: 1996 – 2004

Sen kväll med Luuk (Late night with Luuk) was one of Sweden's and TV4's most popular talk shows ever and started airing in 1996. Kristian Luuk's show had ratings around 1.5 million viewers every week. Over the years, Luuk received many high-profile guests, including Beyoncé, Mary J. Blige, Mariah Carey, Cher, Bruce Dickinson, Whitney Houston, Janet Jackson, Jennifer Lopez, Madonna, Ricky Martin, George Michael, Kylie Minogue, Viggo Mortensen, Pink, Stellan Skarsgård, Bruce Springsteen, Victoria, Crown Princess of Sweden and Robbie Williams. In 2004, after 8 years of broadcasting the show, Kristian Luuk decided to quit the talk show and started his new project God Afton Sverige, which turned out to be a failure.

There are no plans of reviving the show from TV4 at this moment.
