= The Voice Sverige =

Swedish television singing competition

- Genre: Reality competition
- Created by: John de Mol Jr.
- Presented by: Carina Berg
- Judges: Petter; Carola Häggkvist; Ola Salo; Magnus Uggla
- Country of origin: Sweden
- Original language: Swedish
- No. of seasons: 2

Original release
- Network: TV4
- Release: 4 January – 23 March 2012

The Voice Sverige (The Voice Sweden) was the Swedish version of the singing competition The Voice of Holland. The Voice Sweden premiered on 4th January 2012 with its first season. The host was Carina Berg and judges were the singers Carola Häggkvist, Magnus Uggla, Ola Salo and rapper Petter. In January 2013, TV4 announced that Idol, another singing talent show seeking to discover the best singer through nationwide auditions, would return in 2013 and that The Voice Sverige would not continue. and that The Voice Sverige would can be new the seasons with TV4

== Series overview ==
Team Petter
Team Carola
Team Ola
Team Magnus

Season	Premiere	Finale	Winner	Runner-up	Third place	Fourth place	Winning coach	Host	Coaches (chair's order)			
Season	Premiere	Finale	Winner	Runner-up	Third place	Fourth place	Winning coach	Host	1	2	3	4
1	January 4, 2012	April 6, 2012	Ulf Nilsson	Dennis Camitz	Freja Blomber	Micke Mojo Nilsson	Petter Askergren	Carina Berg	Petter	Carola	Ola	Magnus
2	June 7, 2012	September 23, 2013	Upcoming Season					Carina Berg	Petter	Carola	Ola	Magnus
