= Erik Josephson =

Swedish architect

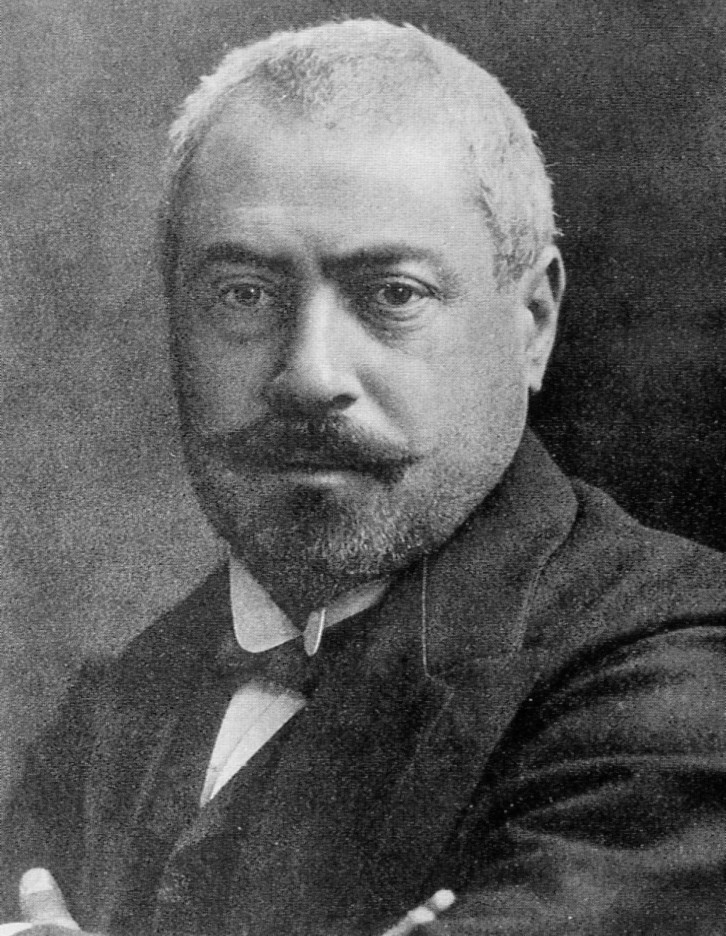
- Erik Josephson in the 1890's
- Born: 7 March 1864; Stockholm
- Died: 17 November 1929 (aged 65); Stockholm
- Occupation: Architect
- Children: Torsten Josephson

Signature
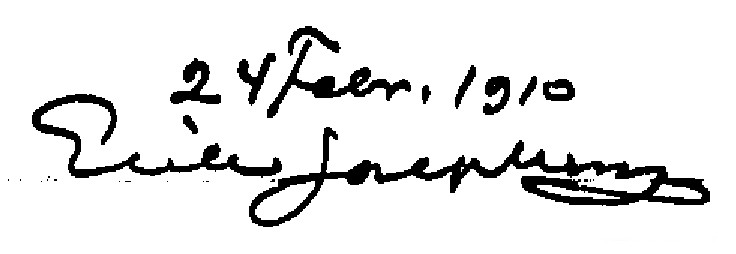

Erik Semmy Josephson (7 March 1864 – 17 November 1929) was a Swedish architect.

== Biography ==
Josephson was born in Stockholm, Sweden. He was the son of wholesaler August Abraham Josephson (1822–67) and Augusta Hortensia Jacobsson (1836–1915). Josephson was of Jewish descent.

He graduated from the Royal Institute of Technology in Stockholm in 1885 and from the Royal Swedish Academy of Fine Arts in 1888. After his studies, he worked at the Swedish National Property Agency (Överintendentsämbetet). Through his state owned work employer he got the opportunity to draw, create and be the architect of about 40 barracks facilities for the armed forces around Sweden between 1891 and 1922.

He also worked with his own architect firm on the side. During late 1890s and early 1900s, he became known as an industry architect and specialist in bank buildings. He designed only banks in Stockholm. Among his most important work was Skandinaviska Bankens palats and Handelsbanken. He was one of the less publicly known architects in Stockholm. He was a style historic architect, also called an eclectic architect. He was categorized as a builder architect with an eye for the present time.
