= Veberöd =

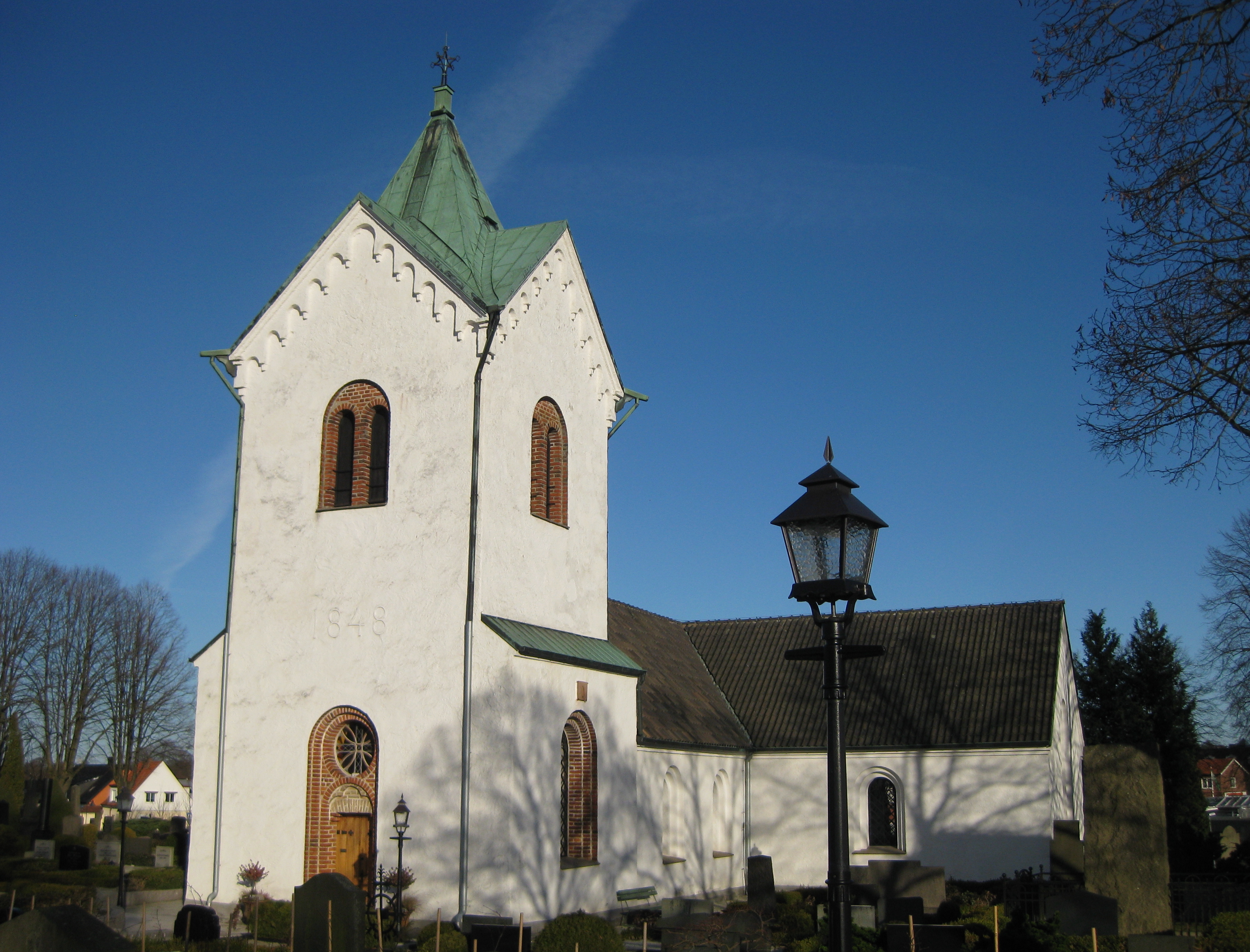
- Veberöd Church in February 2012

- Location within Skåne Location within Sweden
- Coordinates: 55°38′N 13°29′E
- Country: Sweden
- Province: Skåne
- County: Skåne County
- Municipality: Lund Municipality

Area
  - Total: 2.67 km^{2} (1.03 sq mi)

Population (31 December 2010)
  - Total: 4,062
  - Density: 1,521/km^{2} (3,940/sq mi)
- Time zone: UTC+1 (CET)
  - Summer (DST): UTC+2 (CEST)

Veberöd (Swedish pronunciation: [ˈvêːbɛˌrøːd]) is a locality situated in Lund Municipality, Skåne County, Sweden with 6 000 inhabitants in 2025. It is near Vombsjön, a lake that supplies drinking water to Malmö.
