= Swedish Military Intelligence and Security Service =

Division of the Swedish Armed Forces Central Command

Military Intelligence and Security Service
- Militära underrättelse- och säkerhetstjänsten
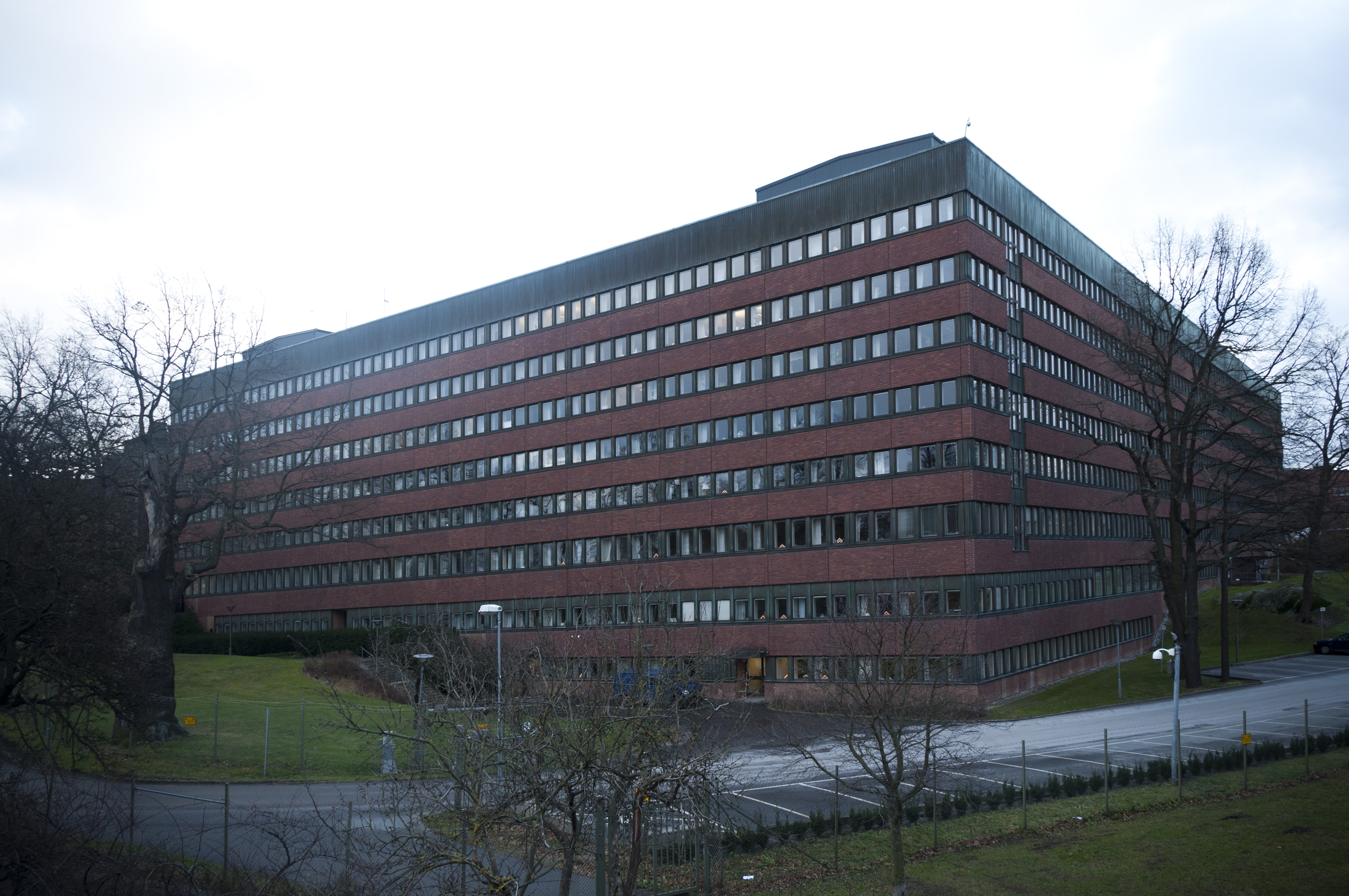
- MUST headquarters

Agency overview
- Formed: 1 July 1994; 32 years ago
- Preceding agencies: Underrättelse- och säkerhetsledningen (USL); Underrättelse- och säkerhetskontoret (USK)
- Headquarters: Swedish Armed Forces Headquarters Stockholm, Sweden; 59°20′47″N 18°5′14″E
- Annual budget: 895,019,000 SEK (2018)
- Agency executives: Thomas Nilsson, Director; Henrik Garmer, Deputy Director
- Website: Official site

The Military Intelligence and Security Service (Swedish: Militära underrättelse- och säkerhetstjänsten, abbr. MUST) is a division of the Swedish Armed Forces Central Command.

MUST is both a foreign intelligence and a military security/counterintelligence agency. In its intelligence role, MUST is responsible for providing intelligence on foreign threats to the Government of Sweden and the Swedish Armed Forces. However, signals intelligence is handled by a separate civilian agency operated by the Ministry of Defence, the Swedish National Defence Radio Establishment (FRA), which is not part of MUST.

MUST is legally prohibited from gathering intelligence on Swedish domestic affairs, except in its more narrowly defined role a counter-intelligence agency tasked with identifying threats to the armed forces, such as sabotage, espionage, or infiltration. Domestic security and civilian counterintelligence in non-military contexts are handled by the Swedish Security Service (SÄPO), the civilian equivalent agency to MUST.

== Departments ==
MUST consists of the following departments:

Underrättelsekontoret (UNDK, Intelligence Office)
Tasked with acquiring strategic intelligence for Central Command and Ministry of Defence decision-making, as well as aiding deployed Swedish military units.
Säkerhetskontoret (SÄKK, Security Office)
Tasked with electronic and cyberwarfare, counterintelligence, cryptography, and personnel vetting, including to protect the Swedish Armed Forces against espionage or infiltration.
Kontoret för Särskild Inhämtning (KSI, Office for Special Acquisition)
Tasked with espionage abroad, including human intelligence and interagency relations, as well as clandestine activities. Little is known about KSI, which is generally considered the most secret part of MUST.

MUST co-operates on various matters with other defence agencies, including the Swedish National Defence Radio Establishment (FRA), the Swedish Defence Research Agency (FOI), and the Swedish Defence Materiel Administration (FMV).

The current Director of MUST is Major General Thomas Nilsson. Even though MUST is technically a part of the military, a majority of its staff is civilian.

== Reorganization ==
In 2026, Sweden's Foreign Minister, Maria Malmer Stenergard, announced the creation of a formal civilian intelligence agency, the Swedish Foreign Intelligence Service (Swedish: Sveriges utrikes underrättelsetjänst, or UND). The UND will absorb responsibility for covert human intelligence (HUMINT) and will work alongside MUST on military intelligence and Säpo on domestic intelligence.

== Directors ==
- 1993–1999: Erik Rossander
- 1999–2003: Håkan Syrén
- 2004–2007: Håkan Pettersson
- 2007–2012: Stefan Kristiansson
- 2012–2019: Gunnar Karlson
- 2019–2023: Lena Hallin
- 2023–present: Thomas Nilsson

== See also ==
- Swedish National Defence Radio Establishment (FRA), Sweden's signals intelligence agency.
- Swedish Security Service (SÄPO), Sweden's domestic security agency.
