= Mats Engman =

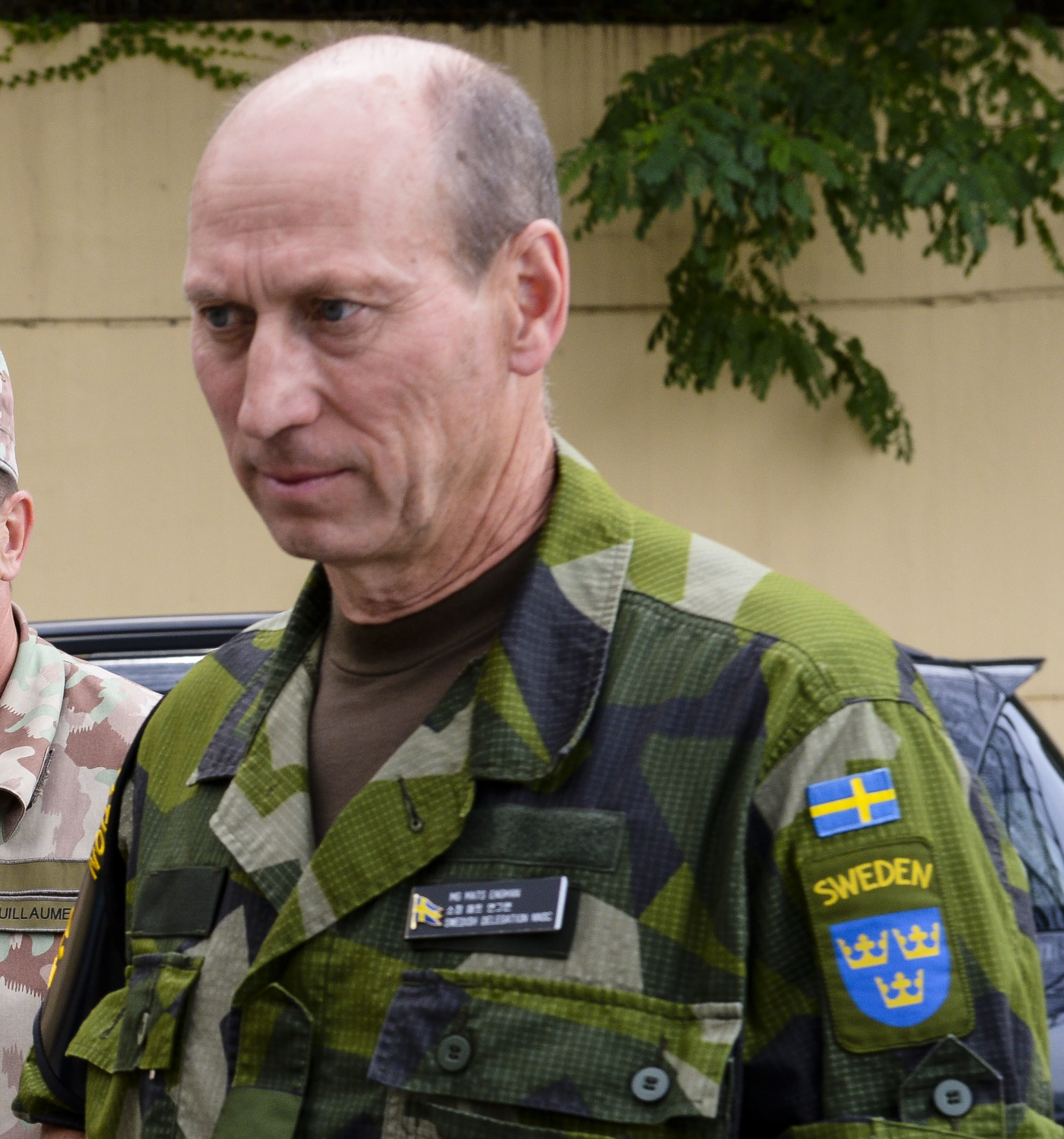
- Born: Mats Erik Engman; 13 April 1954 (age 72); Eskilstuna, Sweden
- Military career
- Allegiance: Sweden
- Branch: Swedish Air Force
- Service years: 1973–present
- Rank: Major General
- Commands: Flygvapnets Uppsalaskolor; Deputy Director of Military Intelligence & Security; Deputy Chief of Policy and Plans Department; NNSC

Major General Mats Erik Engman (born 13 April 1954) is a retired officer in the Swedish Air Force. Engman has served as Deputy Director of Military Intelligence & Security, as Deputy Chief of Policy and Plans Department and as head of the Swedish delegation to the Neutral Nations Supervisory Commission (NNSC) in Korea.

== Career ==
=== Military career ===
Engman was commissioned as an officer in the Swedish Air Force in 1976 and was assigned to Bråvalla Wing with the rank of second lieutenant. He was promoted to lieutenant the same year. Engman was promoted to captain in 1970 and then served at Västmanland Wing. From 1983 to 1984, he served as a military observer for the United Nations Truce Supervision Organization (UNTSO) in Tiberias, Israel and Cairo, Egypt. Engman was promoted to major in 1984 and then attended the Swedish Armed Forces Staff College from 1984 to 1986. From 1986 to 1988, Engman was posted to the staff of the Eastern Military District and from 1988 to 1989 he again served with the UNTSO, this time as plans officer in Jerusalem, Israel. From 1989 to 1992, he served as a strategy teacher at the Swedish Armed Forces Staff College and from 1992 to 1993 as a STRIL commander at Uppland Wing. Engman was promoted to lieutenant colonel in 1993 and studied at the Geneva Centre for Security Policy in Geneva, Switzerland from 1993 to 1994.

Engman served at OPINT at the Swedish Armed Forces Headquarters in Stockholm from 1994 to 1995. He was promoted to colonel in 1996 and was assigned to the Swedish Military Intelligence and Security Service (MUST) as head of the Analysis Department from 1996 to 1997. Engman was then commander of Flygvapnets Uppsalaskolor from 1997 to 1999 and defence attaché in London and Dublin. Engman served as head of the ISS/Strategy Department at the Swedish National Defence College from 2002 to 2003 and from 2003 to 2004 as head of the Assessment Department at MUST. From 2004 to 2007 Engman served as head of the Intelligence Division at MUST when he was promoted to brigadier general. From 2007 to 2008, Engman served as Deputy Director of Military Intelligence & Security and head of the Intelligence Division at MUST. In the spring of 2009, he was a military expert at the Ministry of Defence and from 2010 he served as head of the International Department at the Swedish Armed Forces Headquarters. In 2012, Engman attended the Senior International Defense Management Course at the Naval Postgraduate School in Monterey, California.

Engman assumed the Deputy Chief of Policy and Plans Department position at the Swedish Armed Forces Headquarters on 1 January 2014. In 2014, Engman attended the Senior International Intelligence Fellows Program at the Joint Military Intelligence College in Washington, D.C. Engman assumed the position of Acting Chief of Policy and Plans Department from 22 January 2015. From 16 April 2015, Engman was made available to the Chief of Joint Operations. Upon taking up the position of Acting Chief of Policy and Plans Department, Engman was promoted to major general. Thereafter, the Swedish Armed Forces placed major general Engman as head of the Swedish delegation to the Neutral Nations Supervisory Commission (NNSC) in Korea from 1 May 2015. He was succeeded by Rear Admiral Anders Grenstad on 1 March 2017.

=== Later career ===
In October 2017, Engman retired from active service and transferred to the reserve. He then worked as Director Exercise Evaluation, Viking 2018, Exercise Director for the Defence Staff CPX 2018 in conjunction with Exercise Trident Juncture 2018, as well as Director Exercise Evaluation for Total Defence Exercise 2020. In January 2018, he joined the Institute for Security & Development Policy as a Distinguished Military Fellow, working with focus on security policy, military strategy and crisis management, paying particular attention to East Asia, and the Korean Peninsula.

== Dates of rank ==
- 1976 – Second lieutenant
- 1976 – Lieutenant
- 1979 – Captain
- 1984 – Major
- 1993 – Överstelöjtnant med särskild tjänsteställning
- 1996 – Colonel
- 2007 – Brigadier general
- 2015 – Major general

== Awards and decorations ==
=== Swedish ===
- (Sweden) For Zealous and Devoted Service of the Realm
- (Sweden) Swedish Armed Forces Conscript Medal
- (Sweden) Commemorative Medal of the Nobel Prize to the UN Peacekeeping Forces (Medaljen till minne av Nobels fredspris till FNs fredsbevarande styrkor, NobelFNSMM)

=== Foreign ===
- (South Korea) Order of National Security Merit, 3rd Grade (Cheonsu Medal)
- United Nations Medal (UNTSO) (with award numeral 2)
- (United States) Legion of Merit

Military offices
Preceded by Stefan Kristiansson	Deputy Director of Military Intelligence & Security; 2007–2008	Succeeded by Pontus Melander
Preceded by Ingela Mathiasson	Deputy Chief of Policy and Plans Department; 2014–2015	Succeeded by Michael Claesson
Preceded by Berndt Grundevik	Head of Swedish Delegation to NNSC; 2015–2017	Succeeded by Anders Grenstad
