= Director General of the Swedish Armed Forces =

- Generaldirektör för Försvarsmakten
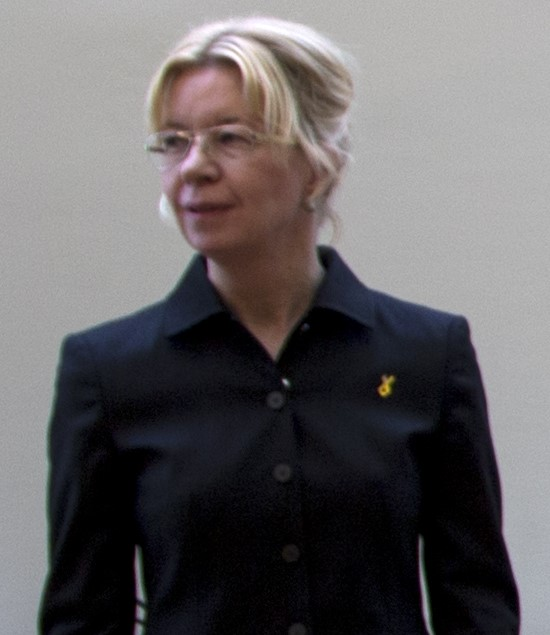
- Incumbent; Christina Malm since 26 January 2026
- Swedish Armed Forces
- Abbreviation: GD
- Member of: Defence Board
- Reports to: Chief of Defence
- Seat: Swedish Armed Forces Headquarters, Lidingövägen 24, Stockholm
- Term length: No fixed term
- Constituting instrument: FFS 2013:4, Chapter 7 FFS 2016:2, Chapter 7 FIB 2020:5, Chapter 7 FIB 2022:6, Chapter 10, FIB 2025:6, Chapter 10
- Formation: 1 October 2005
- First holder: Marie Hafström

The Director General of the Swedish Armed Forces (Swedish: Generaldirektör för Försvarsmakten, GD) is the director general of the Swedish Armed Forces and is the deputy head of the agency. The director general reports directly to the Chief of Defence. The position was established in 2005 to strengthen the financial management of the operations. The Director General of the Swedish Armed Forces is part of the Defence Board (Försvarsmaktsledningen, FML), a group of the Chief of Defence's top commanders. In practice, the Chief of Defence and the director general lead the development of the Swedish Armed Forces together.

== Role ==
From the Ordinance (2024:1333) containing instructions for the Swedish Armed Forces, it follows that the Chief of Defence is the head of the authority and that the Director General is the deputy head. The Chief of Defence is supported in his or her leadership of the authority by the Director General, the Chief of the Defence Staff, the Chief of Joint Operations, the Director of Military Intelligence and Security, Swedish Military Representative to the NATO Military Committee and the European Union (MILREP), as well as the Chief Legal Officer (chefsjuristen), the Chief Financial Officer (ekonomidirektören), and the Director of Human Resources within their respective areas of responsibility. (FIB 2023:5).

== Duties ==
- Section 7: From Section 45 of the Ordinance (2024:1333) containing instructions for the Swedish Armed Forces, it follows that the Director General is the deputy head of the authority. (FIB 2025:1)
- Section 8: The Director General shall support the Chief of Defence in his or her management of the authority, as well as with follow-up and analysis in accordance with the more detailed direction of the Chief of Defence. (FIB 2025:6)
- Section 9: Repealed by FIB 2025:6.
- Section 10: The Director General may enter into contracts and agreements with authorities, municipalities, regions, organizations, and individuals, unless otherwise provided in this regulation.
- Section 11: The Director General has personnel responsibility for the Head of Internal Audit and the Defence Inspector for Health and the Environment.
- Section 12: When the Director General replaces the Chief of Defence as head of the authority, all decision-making powers are included, except for the Chief of Defence's military mandate and powers, as well as the mandates regulated in Annex 8 concerning the Director General's own official travel, leave, and other benefits.

From Annex 8 it follows that, in such cases, the Deputy Head of the Swedish Armed Forces Headquarters or the Chief of the Defence Staff decides on official travel, leave, and other benefits for the Director General.

== Directors General ==
No.	Portrait	Director Generals	Took office	Left office	Time in office	Supreme Commander/Chief of Defence	Ref.
1	Marie Hafström	Marie Hafström (born 1944)	1 October 2005	2008	2–3 years	General Håkan Syrén	
2	Ulf Bengtsson	Ulf Bengtsson (born 1956)	15 October 2008	1 March 2012	3 years, 138 days	General Håkan Syrén; General Sverker Göranson	
3	Peter Sandwall	Peter Sandwall (born 1963)	1 October 2012	18 September 2020	7 years, 353 days	General Sverker Göranson; General Micael Bydén	
4	Mikael Granholm	Mikael Granholm (born ?)	1 June 2021	26 January 2026	4 years, 239 days	General Micael Bydén; General Michael Claesson	
5	Christina Malm	Christina Malm (born 1965)	26 January 2026	Incumbent	224 days	General Michael Claesson	
