= Director of Military Intelligence and Security (Sweden) =

Military appointment

- Chefen för militära underrättelse- och säkerhetstjänsten
- Incumbent; LtGen Thomas Nilsson since 1 May 2023
- Swedish Armed Forces
- Type: Director of the Swedish Military Intelligence and Security Service
- Abbreviation: C MUST
- Member of: Defence Board
- Reports to: Supreme Commander of the Swedish Armed Forces
- Seat: Swedish Armed Forces Headquarters, Lidingövägen 24, Stockholm
- Term length: No fixed term
- Constituting instrument: FFS 2007:4, Chapter 6 FFS 2013:4, Chapter 11; FFS 2016:2, Chapter 11; FIB 2020:1, Chapter 11
- Formation: 1993
- First holder: Major General Erik Rossander
- Deputy: Deputy Director of Military Intelligence & Security

The Director of Military Intelligence and Security (Swedish: Chefen för militära underrättelse- och säkerhetstjänsten, C MUST) is a three-star role within the Swedish Armed Forces, responsible the Swedish Military Intelligence and Security Service. The Director of Military Intelligence and Security is part of the Defence Board (Försvarsmaktsledningen, FML), a group of the Supreme Commander's top commanders. The currect director is Lieutenant General Thomas Nilsson.

== Tasks ==
The Director of Military Intelligence and Security duties are to—among other things—plan, lead, implement and follow up defence intelligence activities as well as military intelligence and security services. The military security service consists of security intelligence service, protective security service and signal protection service. The task includes leading and producing the National Intelligence Unit (Nationella underrättelseenheten, NUE) with the support of the Chief of Armed Forces Training & Procurement. The task includes supporting the Chief of Joint Operations with follow-up and analysis of external developments abroad. The Director of Military Intelligence and Security shall exercise the employer's duties and powers for the Swedish Military Intelligence and Security Service unit at the Swedish Armed Forces Headquarters, including defence attachés, and for the NUE with the support of the Chief of Armed Forces Training & Procurement. The task includes recruiting, training, equipping and leading and distributing the work, taking into account requirements for maintaining preparedness and carrying out operations.

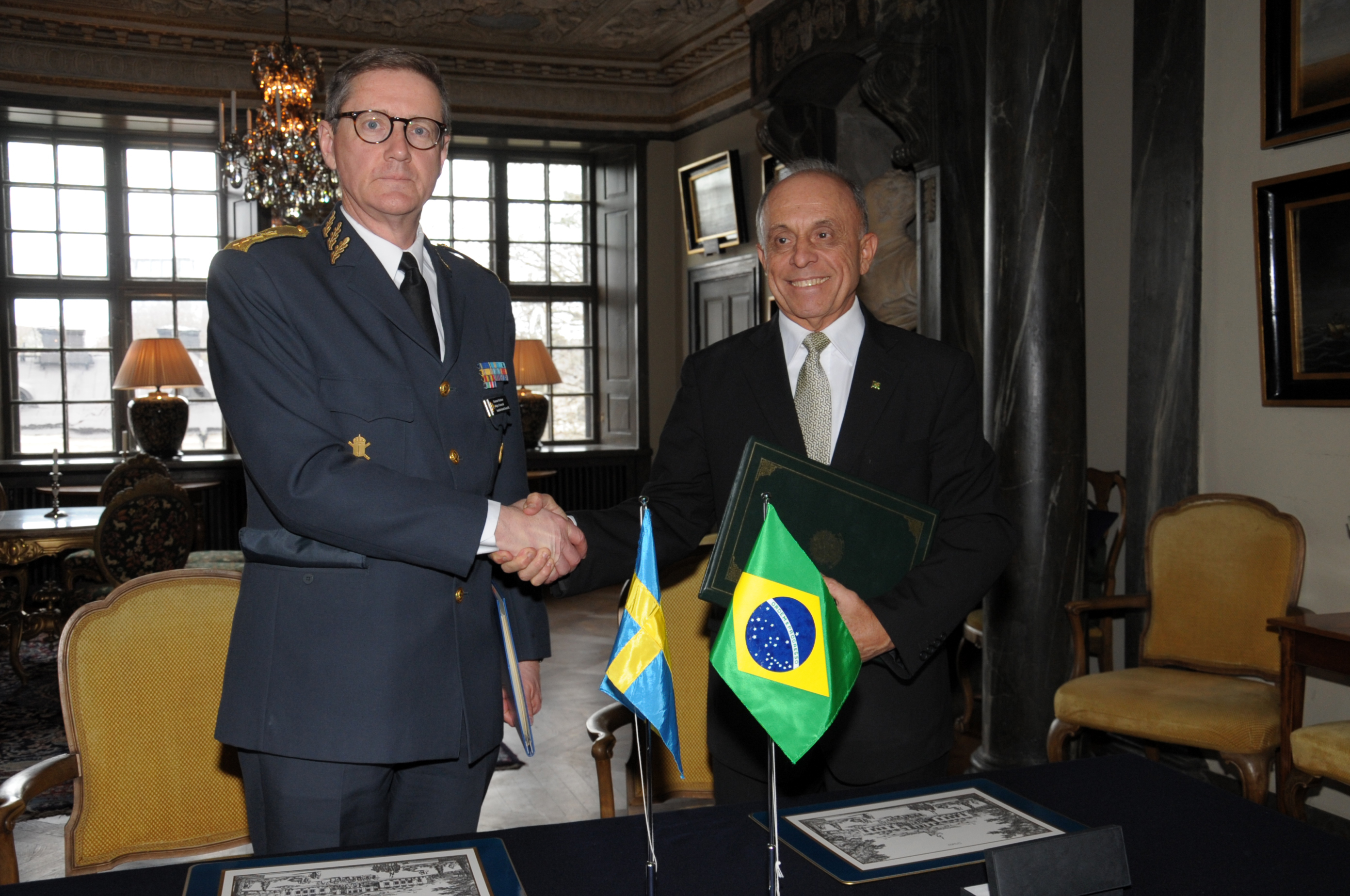
Major General Gunnar Karlson (left) as Director of Military Intelligence and Security in 2014.

The Director of Military Intelligence and Security leads and coordinates the Total defence's signal protection service, including the work with secure cryptographic functions that are intended to protect confidential information and negotiate international signal protection agreements. The task includes supporting the Chief of Armed Forces Training and Procurement in the acquisition of secure cryptographic functions and with statements regarding information technology security. The Director of Military Intelligence and Security shall lead and coordinate the development of the intelligence and security service within the Swedish Armed Forces within the framework of the Armed Forces' operational plan and the Supreme Commander's operational assignment. The Director of Military Intelligence and Security shall support the Chief of Defence Staff and prepare the documents or perform the tasks that the Chief of Defence Staff or the head of the Headquarters decides on within the framework of the Headquarters' operations.

Furthermore, the Director of Military Intelligence and Security shall, with the support of the Chief of Joint Operations, obtain military unit evaluation as a basis for the Chief of Joint Operations' tactical and operational evaluation and support the Chief of Defence Staff's overall evaluation of the operational capability. The Director of Military Intelligence and Security shall support the Government Offices in matters relating to crypto operations and other signal protection activities.

== Directors of Military Intelligence and Security ==
No.	Portrait	Director of Military Intelligence and Security	Took office	Left office	Time in office	Defence branch	Supreme Commander	Ref.
1	Erik Rossander	Major general (Note: Rossander had Senior Colonel's rank when taking office in 1993 and was promoted to Major General in 1994.); Erik Rossander (born 1939)	October 1993 (Note: Rossander began his new position in January 1993 and went in parallel with his predecessor, Senior Colonel Lennart Frick, until his retirement in September of the same year. In October 1993, MUST was organized within the interim organization the Swedish Armed Forces' organizational authority. His appointment as Director was prolonged on 1 July 1994.)	1999	5–6 years	Army	Bengt Gustafsson; Owe Wiktorin	
2	Håkan Syrén	Major general Håkan Syrén (born 1952)	1 October 1999	31 January 2003	3 years, 122 days	Navy (Amphibious Corps)	Owe Wiktorin; Johan Hederstedt	
-	Håkan Pettersson	Brigadier general Håkan Pettersson (born 1947); Acting	1 January 2004	19 February 2004	49 days	Air Force	Håkan Syrén	
3	Håkan Pettersson	Major general Håkan Pettersson (born 1947)	20 February 2004	31 May 2007	3 years, 100 days	Air Force	Håkan Syrén	
4	Stefan Kristiansson	Major general Stefan Kristiansson (born 1951)	June 2007	30 September 2012	4–5 years	Army	Håkan Syrén; Sverker Göranson	
5	Gunnar Karlson	Major general Gunnar Karlson (born 1958)	1 October 2012	30 April 2019	6 years, 211 days	Army	Sverker Göranson; Micael Bydén	
6	Lena Hallin	Major general Lena Hallin (born 1961)	1 May 2019	30 April 2023	3 years, 364 days	Air Force	Micael Bydén	
7	Thomas Nilsson	Lieutenant general Thomas Nilsson (born 1963)	1 May 2023	Incumbent	3 years, 129 days	Air Force	Micael Bydén; Michael Claesson	

== Deputy Directors of Military Intelligence & Security ==
No.	Portrait	Deputy Director of Military Intelligence and Security	Took office	Left office	Time in office	Defence branch	Prime Minister	Ref.
1	Nils-Ove Jansson	Captain; Nils-Ove Jansson (born 1946)	1994	1995	0–1 years	Navy	Owe Wiktorin	
2	Håkan Pettersson	Brigadier general Håkan Pettersson (born 1947)	1995	2004	8–9 years	Air Force	Owe Wiktorin; Johan Hederstedt; Håkan Syrén	
3	Stefan Kristiansson	Brigadier general Stefan Kristiansson (born 1951)	May 2004	June 2007	2–3 years	Army	Håkan Syrén	
4	Mats Engman	Brigadier general Mats Engman (born 1954)	September 2007	July 2008	0–1 years	Air Force	Håkan Syrén	
5	Pontus Melander	Pontus Melander (born 1963)	October 2008	2010	1–2 years	-	Håkan Syrén; Sverker Göranson	
6	Helena Rietz	Helena Rietz (born 1968)	2010	2013	2–3 years	-	Sverker Göranson	
7	Julius Liljeström	Julius Liljeström (born 1969)	2014	2016	1–2 years	-	Sverker Göranson; Micael Bydén	-
8	Kristina Bergendal	Kristina Bergendal (born 1963)	1 May 2016	30 September 2018	2 years, 152 days	-	Micael Bydén	
9	Lena Hallin	Brigadier general Lena Hallin (born 1961)	1 October 2018	30 April 2019	211 days	Air Force	Micael Bydén	
10	Daniel Olsson	Daniel Olsson (born ?)	1 October 2019	2023	3–4 years	-	Micael Bydén	
11	Henrik Garmer	Henrik Garmer (born 1975)	7 August 2023	Incumbent	3 years, 31 days	-	Micael Bydén; Michael Claesson	
