= Håkan Pettersson (Swedish Air Force officer) =

Swedish Air Force officer

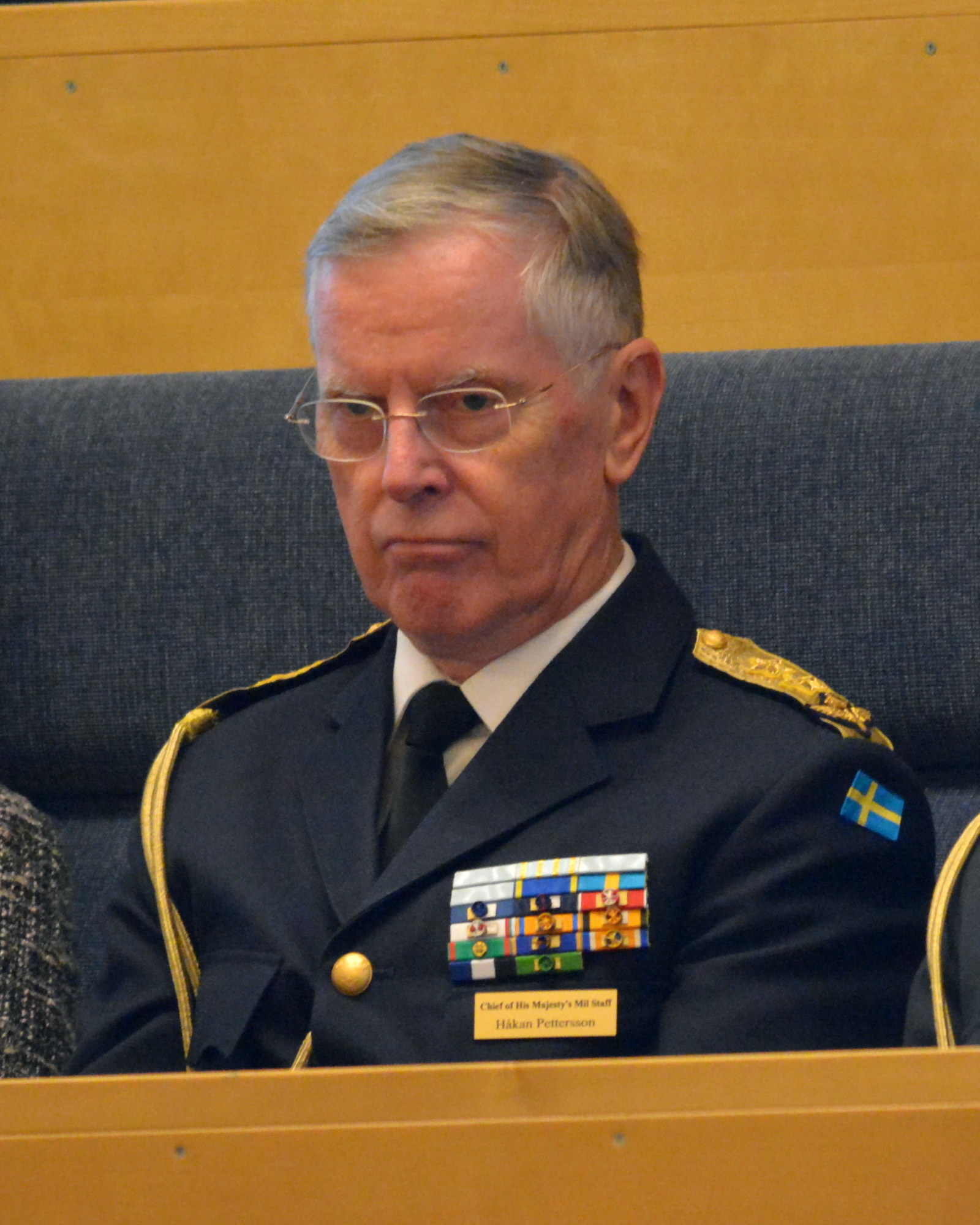
- Born: Sven Håkan Pettersson; 3 May 1947 (age 79); Bromma, Sweden
- Military career
- Allegiance: Sweden
- Branch: Swedish Air Force
- Service years: 19??–2007
- Rank: Major General
- Commands: Deputy Director of Military Intelligence and Security; Director of Military Intelligence and Security
- Other work: Chief of His Majesty's Military Staff

Major General Sven Håkan Pettersson (born 3 May 1947) is a retired Swedish Air Force officer. He served as Director of Military Intelligence and Security from 2004 to 2007 and as Chief of His Majesty's Military Staff from 2007 to 2018.

== Career ==
Pettersson was raised in Upplands Väsby outside Stockholm and began his military career as a combat control officer. In the 1980s, Pettersson served as head of the Air Section (Flygenheten). He served as an ADC to His Majesty the King between 1983 and 1996. When the Berlin Wall fell, Pettersson was the head of the Air Defense Center in Bålsta. In 1992, he was appointed head of the intelligence and security department of the Middle Military District Staff in Strängnäs. Pettersson then served as Deputy Director of Military Intelligence and Security in the Swedish Armed Forces Headquarters from 1995 to 2004. On 1 July 1998, Pettersson was promoted to Senior Colonel. In 2001, Pettersson was promoted to brigadier general.

He served as Acting Director of Military Intelligence and Security from 1 January 2004 until 19 February 2004, when Pettersson was promoted to major general and appointed Director of Military Intelligence and Security. He took office of 20 February 2004. This position included responsibility as Chief of Security for the Swedish Armed Forces and the Chief of Signal Protection for the Total Defense. He served in this position until 31 May 2007. During this time Petterssn also served as Chief ADC to His Majesty the King.

On 1 July 2007, Pettersson assumed the position of Chief of His Majesty's Military Staff. After the engagement of Crown Princess Victoria and Daniel Westling on 24 February 2009, Pettersson was appointed coordinator of the Wedding of Victoria, Crown Princess of Sweden, and Daniel Westling by the King in March 2009. The Swedish government extended his appointment as First Aide-de-Camp and Chief of His Majesty's Military Staff on 1 July 2015. He served in this position until 1 October 2018 when he was succeeded by Lieutenant General Jan Salestrand.

Pettersson is a board member of Comex Electronics AB.

== Personal life ==
Pettersson is the father of two children.

== Dates of rank ==
- 1 July 1992 – Colonel
- 1 July 1998 – Senior colonel
- 2001 – Brigadier general
- 2004 – Major general

== Awards and decorations ==
=== Swedish ===
- (Sweden) King Carl XVI Gustaf's Jubilee Commemorative Medal I (1996)
- (Sweden) King Carl XVI Gustaf's Jubilee Commemorative Medal II (23 August 2013)
- (Sweden) Crown Princess Victoria and Prince Daniel's Wedding Commemorative Medal (8 June 2010)
- (Sweden) H. M. The King's Medal, 8th size gold (silver-gilt) medal worn on the chest suspended by the Order of the Seraphim ribbon (2017)
- (Sweden) For Zealous and Devoted Service of the Realm
- (Sweden) Swedish Armed Forces Conscript Medal

=== Foreign ===
- (Italy) 1st Class / Knight Grand Cross of the Order of Merit of the Italian Republic (24 March 2009)
- (Estonia) 1st Class of the Order of the Cross of the Eagle (12 January 2011)
- Grand Decoration of Honour in Gold with Sash for Services to the Republic of Austria (November 2007)
- (Portugal) Grand Cross of the Military Order of Aviz (2 May 2008)
- (Portugal) Officer of the Order of Prince Henry (15 May 1991) (Note: According to the source, he received the rank of 'officer', but according to this image (https://commons.wikimedia.org/wiki/File:H%C3%A5kan_Petterson.jpg) he wears the 'knight's' ribbon bar (without a rosette).)

== Footnotes ==
Military offices
Preceded by Nils-Ove Jansson	Deputy Director of Military Intelligence and Security; 1995–2004	Succeeded by Stefan Kristiansson
Preceded by Håkan Syrén	Director of Military Intelligence and Security; 2004–2007	Succeeded by Stefan Kristiansson
Court offices
Preceded by Frank Rosenius	Chief of His Majesty's Military Staff; 2007–2018	Succeeded by Jan Salestrand
