= Lena Hallin =

Swedish Air Force officer

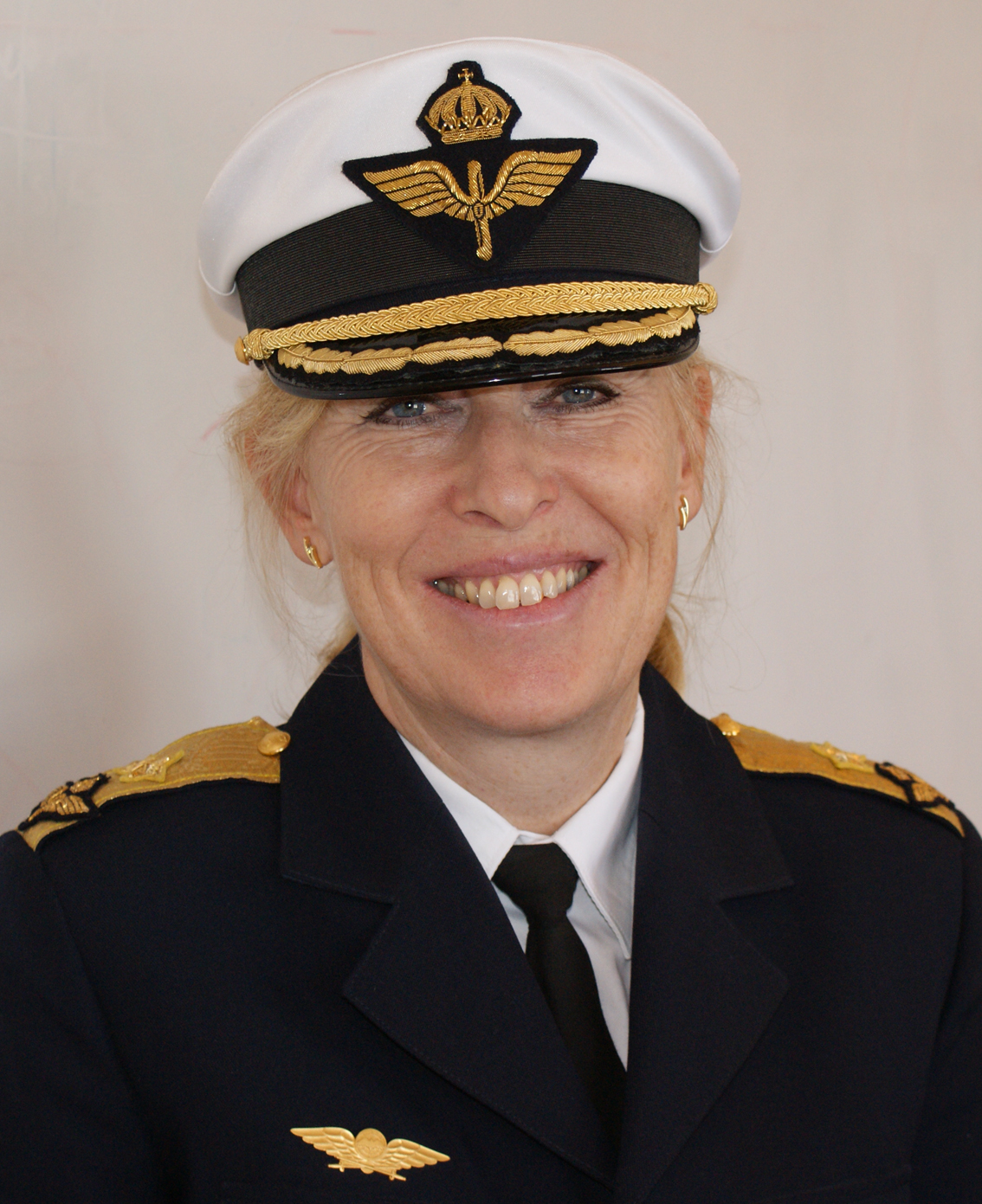
- Hallin in 2015.
- Born: Ann Lena Larsson; 26 March 1961 (age 65); Gothenburg, Sweden
- Military career
- Allegiance: Sweden
- Branch: Swedish Air Force
- Service years: 1980–2023
- Rank: Major general
- Commands: Jämtland Wing; Command and Control Regiment; Deputy Director of Military Intelligence and Security; Director of Military Intelligence and Security
- Other work: Military attaché, London

Major General Ann Lena Hallin née Larsson (born 26 March 1961) is a retired Swedish Air Force officer. She served as the Director of Military Intelligence and Security from 2019 until her retirement in 2023. Before that, Hallin served as Deputy Director of Military Intelligence and Security, and as commander of the Jämtland Wing and the Command and Control Regiment.

== Early life ==
Hallin was born on 26 March 1961 in Johanneberg Parish in Gothenburg and Bohus County. She passed studentexamen after attending the humanistic program in Kungsbacka. In 1980, she belonged to the very first batch of female conscripts in Sweden. She was one of 80 girls who mustered in, one of the 30 who were drafted and of the 25 who completed the year as conscripts in the Swedish Air Force. Hallin did her military service at the Uppland Wing (F 16) and the Scania Wing (F 10) in 1980 focusing on combat control and air surveillance.

== Career ==
She attended the Swedish Air Force Officers’ College (Flygvapnets officershögskola) from 1981 to 1983 when she was commissioned as an officer in the Swedish Air Force as a second lieutenant. Hallin then served with combat control and air surveillance for 10 years. In 1985, she passed the General Course of the Royal Swedish Air Force Staff College (Flygvapnets krigshögskola) and in 1988 the Advanced Course at the same staff college. In 1992, Hallin attended the Staff Officer Course of the Swedish National Defence College and she served as head of HR Unit at Jämtland Wing (F 4). There she served as administrator for all military personnel within the wing, responsible for recruitment, supervision and employment during peacetime. The war placement was as before in the combat control and air surveillance. From 1997 to 1999, she underwent the Senior Staff Course, Operation, at the Swedish National Defence College. She has also had civilian employment as head of Human Resources in Östersund Municipality from 1999 to 2000. From August 2000 to July 2001, she served as head of department at the Swedish Armed Forces Staff College and from January 2001 to January 2002, Hallin was head of education in Östersund Municipality. She was then Head Teacher at the Swedish National Defence College from August 2001 to January 2002 and Head of the Education and Training Unit (Grundorganisationsavdelningen, Utbildning, GRO UTB) at the Swedish Armed Forces Headquarters from February 2002 to May 2003.

Hallin served as chief of staff at the Jämtland Wing (F 4) from June 2003 and was then the last wing commander and head of the decommissioning organization for the Jämtland Wing (AO F 4) from June 2005 to September 2006. From January 2007 to January 2011, she was Sweden's first female unit commander when she was commanding officer of the Command and Control Regiment. Hallin served as military attaché at the Embassy of Sweden, London from 2011 to 2013. In 2013, Hallin was promoted to brigadier general and appointed head of management system in the Swedish Armed Forces. Thus she became Sweden's first female general outside the military medical field. (Note: Lena Hallin is the first female general in the Generalitetet (army and air force). Major General Ann-Marie Göransson, formerly the Surgeon-General of the Swedish Armed Forces, was the first female general officer at all. Göransson was placed in what was called the medical staff according to the Swedish Armed Forces' roll.) As head of the management system, Hallin she led the strategic development in the management system area and represented the agency in management system issues, both nationally and internationally. She was also responsible for the implementation of the operations assignments in the Command and Control Regiment, the Swedish Armed Forces Network and Telecommunications Unit (Försvarsmaktens telenät- och markteleförband, FMTM) and the Swedish Armed Forces Intelligence and Security Centre (Försvarsmaktens underrättelse- och säkerhetscentrum, FMUndSäkC), as well as for the acquisition of the relevant material systems, but also led the Swedish Armed Forces frequency management, weather service and geographical information service.

From October 2013 to June 2016, Hallin was head of the Swedish Defence Research Agency (FOI)'s Division of C4ISR (Command, Control, Communications, Computers, Intelligence, Surveillance and Reconnaissance) and from July 2016 and almost three years after that, she conducted International Studies/Security Policy at the Royal College of Defence Studies in the United Kingdom. From September 2017 until 2018, Hallin served as a military advisor at the Ministry for Foreign Affairs in Stockholm. On 1 October 2018, she took up the position of Deputy Director of Military Intelligence and Security, with an appointment until 30 April 2019. On 1 May 2019, Hallin took over as Director of Military Intelligence and Security, after the government announced her appointment on 30 August 2018. In connection with the appointment, she was promoted to major general. She was succeeded by Lieutenant General Thomas Nilsson in 2023 and retired from the Swedish Armed Forces.

== Other work ==
Hallin was a fellow of the Royal Foundation (Kungafonden) from 2008 to 2009, chairman of the Psychological Operations Study from 2007 to 2010, member of the Swedish Armed Forces Personnel Responsibility Committee (Försvarsmaktens personalansvarsnämnd), and the Swedish Armed Forces point of contact of the Swedish Voluntary Radio Organization (Frivilliga Radioorganisationen).

== Personal life ==
In 1984 she married Terje Hallin (born 1958). They have three sons.

== Dates of rank ==
- 1983 – Second lieutenant
- 1985 – Lieutenant
- 1989 – Captain
- 1993 – Major
- 2001 – Lieutenant colonel
- 2006 – Colonel
- 2013 – Brigadier general
- 2019 – Major general

== Awards and decorations ==
- (Sweden) For Zealous and Devoted Service of the Realm
- (Sweden) Swedish Armed Forces Conscript Medal
- (Sweden) Jämtland Wing Medal of Merit (Jämtlands flygflottiljs förtjänstmedalj)
- (Sweden) Command and Control Regiment Medal of Merit (Ledningsregementets förtjänstmedalj)
- (Sweden) Katanga Cross (Katangakorset), UN Veterans Congo's honorary pin

== Footnotes ==
Military offices
Preceded by Kristina Bergendal	Deputy Director of Military Intelligence and Security; 2018–2019	Succeeded by Daniel Olsson
Preceded by Gunnar Karlson	Director of Military Intelligence and Security; 2019–2023	Succeeded by Thomas Nilsson
