= Thomas Nilsson (Swedish Air Force officer) =

Swedish Air Force officer (born 1963)

- Born: Ulf Thomas Nilsson; 1 October 1963 (age 63)
- Military career
- Allegiance: Sweden
- Branch: Swedish Air Force
- Service years: 1984–present
- Rank: Lieutenant general
- Commands: Command and Control Regiment; Chief Information Officer, SAFHQ; Director of Military Intelligence and Security
- Conflicts: War in Afghanistan

Lieutenant General Ulf Thomas Nilsson (born 1 October 1963) is a Swedish Air Force officer. He currently serves as the Director of Military Intelligence and Security from 1 May 2023. Prior to that Nilsson served as the Chief Information Officer of the Swedish Armed Forces from 2020 to 2022.

== Career ==
Nilsson graduated from the Air Force Academy in 1984. The first ten years of his career he served as fighter controller in various positions in the 101st and the 172nd Air Surveillance and Control Battalion. After graduation from the Advanced Command Course at the Swedish National Defence College in 1999, he served in various staff positions at the Swedish Armed Forces Headquarters in Stockholm. During the first Swedish Presidency of the Council of the European Union in 2001, he worked with support to the Permanent Representation of Sweden to the EU. During 2002–2005 he served as commanding officer of the 162nd Air Surveillance and Control Battalion in Uppsala. Nilsson served as an ADC to His Majesty the King Carl XVI Gustaf from 2004 to 2015. Nilsson served as head of the Air Force Department in the Training & Procurement Staff at the Swedish Armed Forces Headquarters from 2007 to 2009 and then as head of the Coordination Section in the Air Component Command from 2009. In 2010, Nilsson he served in ISAF Joint Command in Kabul, Afghanistan. He then served as commanding officer of the Command and Control Regiment in Enköping from 2011 to 2014.

Colonel Nilsson was promoted to brigadier general on 27 January 2014. At the same time, Nilsson was appointed Director of the C4ISR Department at the Swedish Defence Materiel Administration until 31 December 2016. The Swedish Armed Forces posted Nilsson at the disposal of the Ministry of Defence from 1 September 2016 as a special attaché with an acting rank of major general. At the Permanent Representative of Sweden to the European Union in Brussels, Major General Nilsson worked as a military advisor and also Sweden's military representative in the EU. He was sent by the Swedish government and represented Sweden in military matters. He was a Swedish representative in the European Union Military Committee, except when the Supreme Commander of the Swedish Armed Forces himself participates in committee meetings. Nilsson was also the Swedish military representative to NATO within the framework of the Partnership for Peace program. The Swedish Armed Forces posted Nilsson at the disposal of the Ministry of Defence from 1 September 2019, and during the period 1 September 2019 to 31 August 2020, as special attache, he would continue to have the acting rank of major general. The Swedish Armed Forces granted Nilsson a leave of absence from the Swedish Armed Forces for limited employment as a special attaché in the position of military advisor at Sweden's Permanent Representation to the EU in Brussels.

Nilsson was appointed Chief Information Officer (CIO) in the Defence Staff at the Swedish Armed Forces Headquarters from 1 September 2020. He was simultaneously promoted to major general. As CIO, he kept up the work ahead of Sweden's accession to NATO. Nilsson was placed at the disposal of the Chief of the Defence Staff, Lieutenant General Michael Claesson from 1 January 2023. On 23 March 2023, the Swedish government appointed Nilsson as Director of Military Intelligence and Security from 1 May 2023. He was simultaneously promoted to lieutenant general.

== Personal life ==
Nilsson is married and has two sons.

== Dates of rank ==
- 1984 – Second lieutenant
- ? – Lieutenant
- ? – Captain
- ? – Major
- ? – Lieutenant colonel
- ? – Colonel
- 27 January 2014 – Brigadier general
- 1 September 2020 – Major general
- 1 May 2023 – Lieutenant general

== Awards and decorations ==
=== Swedish ===
- (Sweden) King Carl XVI Gustaf's Jubilee Commemorative Medal II (23 August 2013)
- (Sweden) H. M. The King's Medal, 8th size gold (silver-gilt) medal worn on the chest suspended by the Order of the Seraphim ribbon (2009)
- (Sweden) Crown Princess Victoria and Prince Daniel's Wedding Commemorative Medal (8 June 2010)
- (Sweden) For Zealous and Devoted Service of the Realm
- (Sweden) Swedish Armed Forces Conscript Medal
- (Sweden) Swedish Armed Forces International Service Medal
- (Sweden) Command and Control Regiment Medal of Merit in gold (Ledningsregementets förtjänstmedalj i guld)
- (Sweden) Uppland Wing Commemorative Medal (Upplands flygflottiljs minnesmedalj, UpplffljSMM)
- (Sweden) Katanga Cross (Katangakorset), UN Veterans Congo's honorary pin

=== Foreign ===
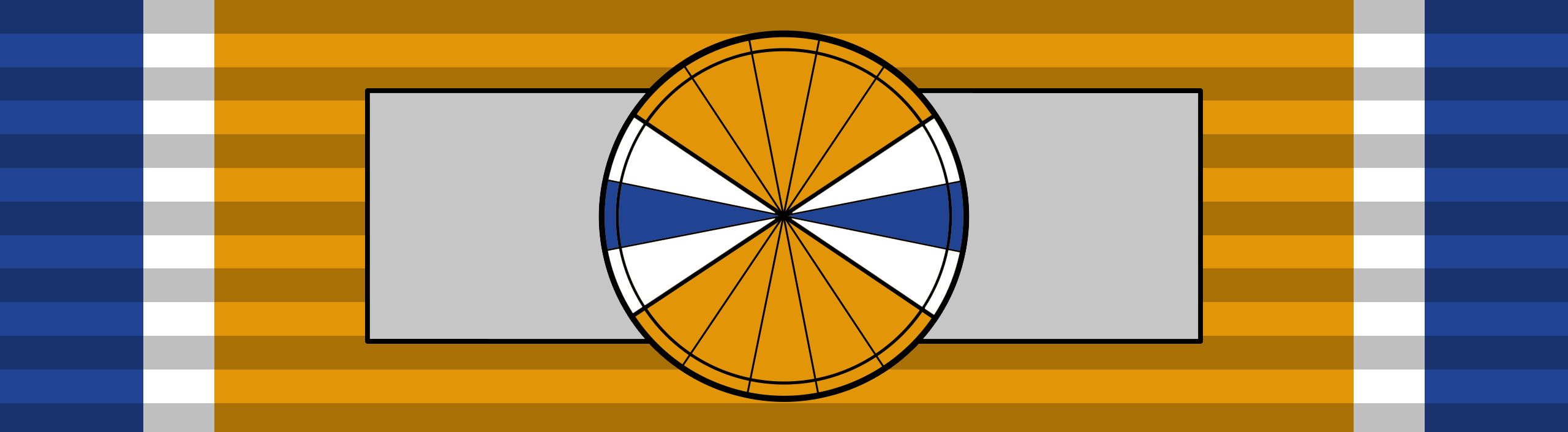
- (Netherlands) Commander of the Order of Orange-Nassau
- Commander of the Order of Merit of the Republic of Poland
- (Luxembourg) Officer of the Order of Adolphe of Nassau
- (United Nations) NATO Non-Article 5 medal for ISAF

Military offices
Preceded by Odd Werin	Sweden's Military Representative to the EU and NATO; 2016–2020	Succeeded by Jens Nykvist
Preceded by Fredrik Robertsson	Chief Information Officer; 2020–2022	Succeeded by ?
Preceded by Lena Hallin	Director of Military Intelligence and Security; 2023–present	Succeeded by Incumbent
