= Gunnar Karlson =

Swedish Army officer

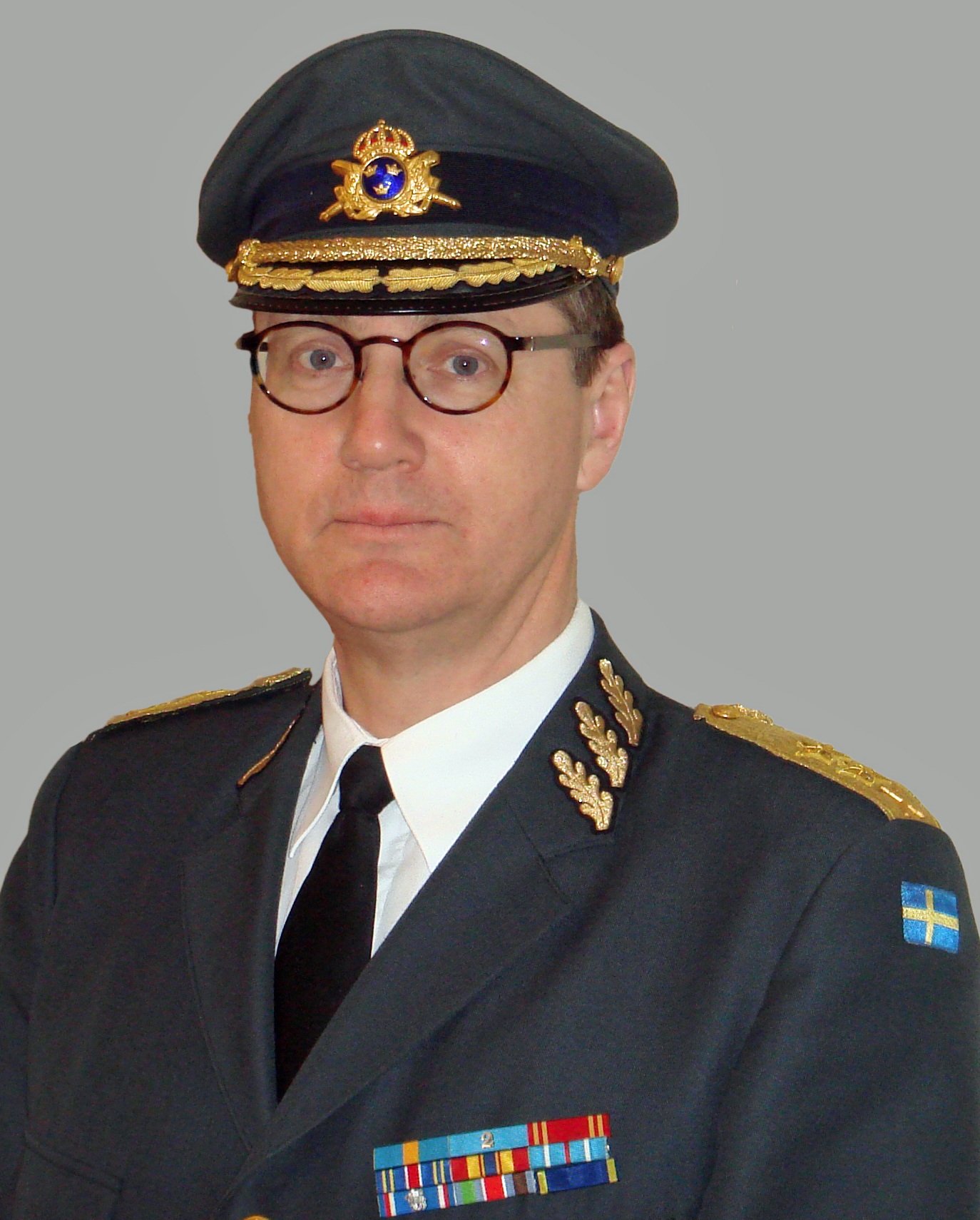
- Karlson in 2011.
- Born: Gunnar Åke Karlson; 7 April 1958 (age 68); Karlskrona, Sweden
- Military career
- Allegiance: Sweden
- Branch: Swedish Army
- Service years: 1980–2019
- Rank: Major General
- Commands: Gotland Regiment; Assistant Chief of Armed Forces Training & Procurement; Director of Military Intelligence and Security

Major General Gunnar Åke Karlson (born 7 April 1958) is a retired Swedish Army officer. Karlson's senior appointments include regimental commander of Gotland Regiment, Chief of Training and Procurement and Director of Military Intelligence and Security. He retired from active service in April 2019.

== Career ==
Karlson was born on 7 April 1958 in Karlskrona, Sweden, the son of education counselor Åke Karlson and his wife Gun (née Simonsson). During the Cold War in the 1970s, he got involved politically on the left wing. Karlson was active in the student body in the school and a sympathizer of the former Left Party-Communists (VPK), but was not a member. His background would later arouse some interest among his colleagues as a young army officer at the regiment in Växjö. Karlson passed studentexamen at Växjö gymnasium in 1977 and attended the Military Academy Karlberg from 1977 to 1980. He was commissioned as a lieutenant at Kronoberg Regiment (I 11) in 1980 and was deputy infantry platoon leader from 1980 to 1982. Karlsson attended the Service Branch School (Truppslagsskola) for regimental officers from 1982 to 1983 when he was promoted to captain. Karlson attended the Swedish Armed Forces Language School (Försvarets tolkskola) from 1983 to 1984.

He was deputy study director at the Swedish Infantry Combat School from 1984 to 1985 and was infantry platoon leader there from 1985 to 1986. Karlson completed the general course of the Swedish Armed Forces Staff College from 1986 to 1987 and was an infantry company commander at Dalarna Regiment (I 13) from 1987 to 1988 when he was promoted to major. He completed the Swedish Armed Forces Staff College's two year higher staff course from 1988 to 1990 and served as head teacher of tactics at the Infantry Combat School from 1990 to 1991. Karlson then served as a staff officer at the Army Staff from 1991 to 1993 and as deputy chief of staff of Nordbat 2 from 1993 to 1994 which was part of the United Nations Protection Force (UNPROFOR) in Bosnia and Herzegovina. In 1994 he was also promoted to lieutenant colonel. Karlson was teacher of the Swedish Armed Forces Staff College's two year management course from 1994 to 1995 and was deputy head of the Organization for Security and Co-operation in Europe (OSCE) Assistance Group to Chechnya from 1995 to 1996.

Karlson was then chief of Section 1 of the Eastern Army Division's staff from 1996 to 1998 and deputy brigade commander of the Småland Brigade from 1998 to 2000 when he was promoted to colonel. Karlson was deputy military representative at the Mission of Sweden to NATO from 2000 to 2003 and commanding officer of the Gotland Regiment (P 18) from 2003 to 2005. In 2006 he completed the Swedish Defence University's course at Solbacka and in 2007 parts of the Swedish Defence University's higher management course. In 2007 he was also promoted to brigadier general. Karlson was military advisor at the Ministry for Foreign Affairs from 2008 to 2009 and completed the European Security and Defence High Level Course at the European Security and Defence College in the same years. In 2009 he was also promoted to major general. Karlson then served as Assistant Chief of Armed Forces Training & Procurement from 2009 until 4 June 2012 when he took over as head of restructuring until 1 October the same year when he was appointed Director of Military Intelligence and Security. Karlson retired in April 2019.

== Personal life ==
In 2003 he married the art director Anette Lövgren (born 1963 in Växjö), the daughter of the tinsmith Allan Lövgren and Rut Lövgren.

== Dates of rank ==
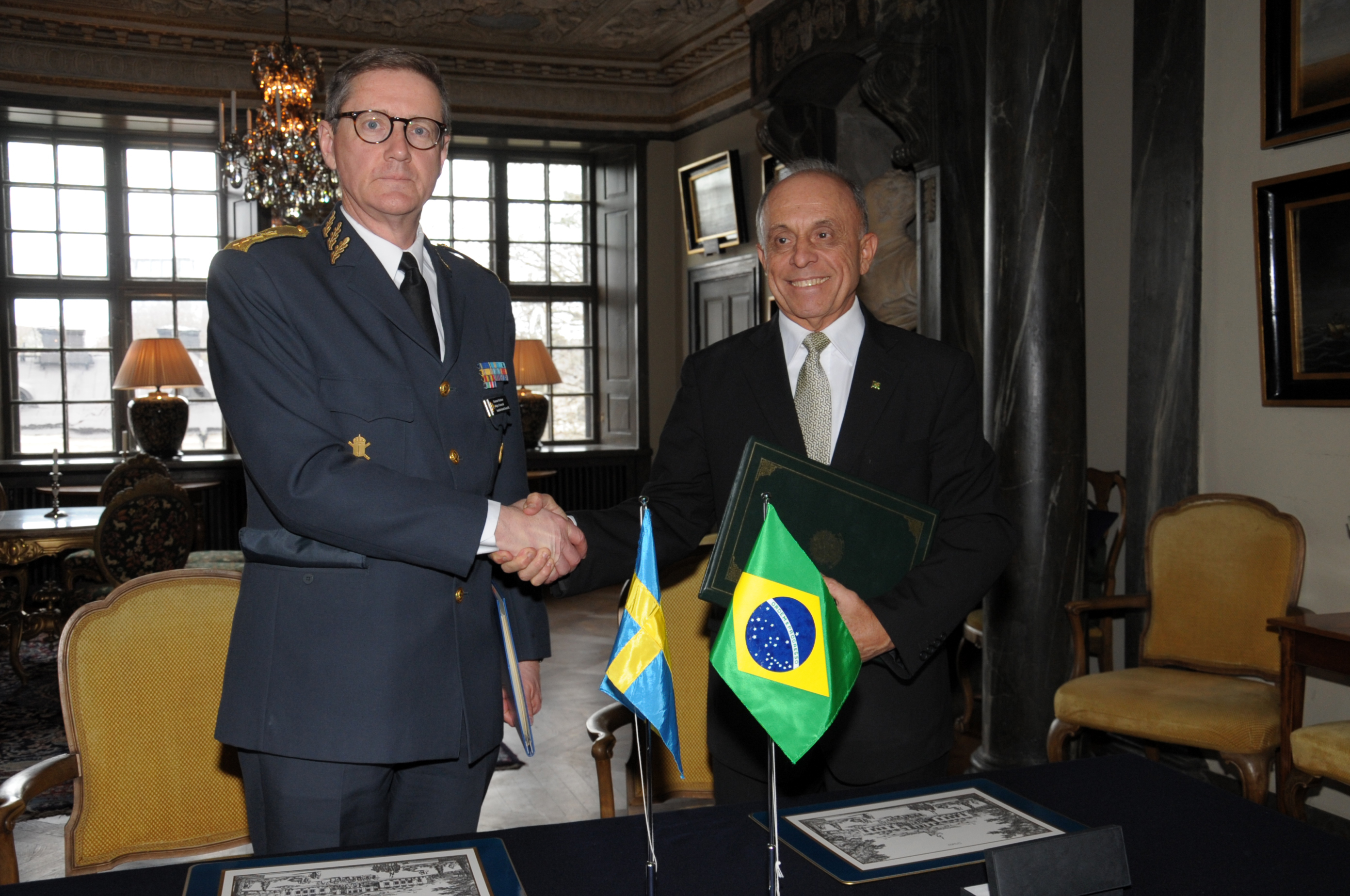
Karlson in 2014.

- 1980 - Lieutenant
- 1983 - Captain
- 1988 - Major
- 1994 - Lieutenant Colonel
- 2000 - Colonel
- 2007 - Brigadier General
- 2009 - Major General

== Awards and decorations ==
Karlson's awards:

=== Swedish ===
- (Sweden) Swedish Armed Forces Conscript Medal
- (Sweden) Swedish Armed Forces International Service Medal
- (Sweden) Kronoberg Regiment Commemorate Medal (Kronobergs regementes minnesmedalj)
- (Sweden) Eastern Army Division Commemorative Medal (Östra arméfördelningens minnesmedalj, ÖFördSMM)
- (Sweden) Småland Brigade Commemorative Medal (Smålandsbrigadens minnesmedalj)
- (Sweden) Gotland Regiment Medal of Honor (Gotlands regementes hedersmedalj)
- (Sweden) Gotland Regiment Commemorative Medal (Gotlands regementes minnesmedalj, GotlregMSM)
- (Sweden) For Zealous and Devoted Service of the Realm

=== Foreign ===
- United Nations Medal (UNPROFOR)

Military offices
Preceded by Göran Mårtensson	Assistant Chief of Armed Forces Training & Procurement; 2009–2012	Succeeded by Bengt Svensson
Preceded by Stefan Kristiansson	Director of Military Intelligence and Security; 2012–2019	Succeeded by Lena Hallin
