= Johan Hederstedt =

Swedish Army officer

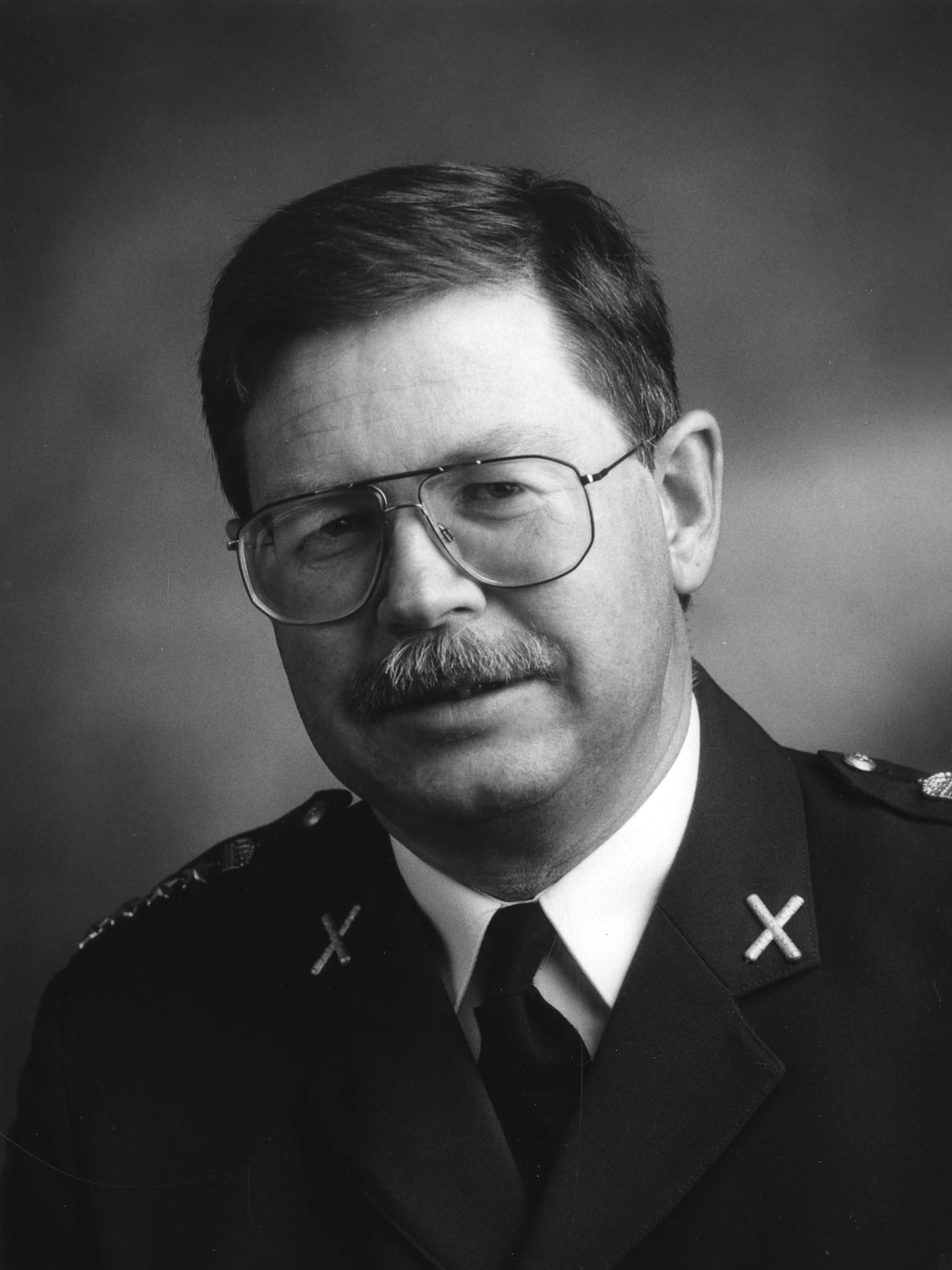
- Hederstedt as senior colonel in the mid-1990s.
- Born: Johan Ivar Hederstedt; 26 August 1943 (age 83); Nässjö, Sweden
- Relatives: Peter Hederstedt (son)
- Military career
- Allegiance: Sweden
- Branch: Swedish Army
- Service years: 1966–2003
- Rank: General
- Units: Älvsborg Regiment; Northern Småland Regiment; UNFICYP; UNIFIL
- Commands: Life Guards Brigade; Western Army Division; Supreme Commander of the Swedish Armed Forces
- Conflicts: Cyprus dispute Lebanese Civil War; Yugoslav Wars
- Awards: H. M. The King's Medal

General Johan Ivar Hederstedt (born 26 August 1943) is a senior Swedish Army officer. Hederstedt was commissioned as an officer in 1966 and went on to serve as a second lieutenant in the Älvsborg Regiment. In 1981, he embarked on a United Nations mission to the volatile region of Cyprus, a commitment that was followed by another overseas assignment in 1988 when he assumed command of a UN battalion in Lebanon. Throughout the 1990s, Hederstedt held various significant roles within the military, including serving as the brigade commander of the Life Guards Brigade, the commander of the Western Army Division, the deputy chief of the operations leadership for international operations, and a military expert at the Ministry of Defence. In the year 2000, he assumed the position of Supreme Commander of the Armed Forces. Remarkably, his tenure in this role lasted only three years, making him the shortest-serving Supreme Commander in history.

In the wake of the defence budget cuts during the 1990s, the Swedish Armed Forces transitioned from a focus on territorial defence to a more expeditionary approach. Hederstedt assumed the primary responsibility for implementing this transition. However, he faced criticism for what was perceived as a slow pace of change and for his inability to make the transition cost-effective.

== Early life ==
Hederstedt was born on 26 August 1943 in Nässjö Parish, Jönköping County, Sweden the son of lieutenant colonel Johan Hederstedt and his wife Hillevi (née Sandstedt). He attended Norra Latin in Stockholm between 1957 and 1962. He did his military service in Älvsborg Regiment (I 15) in Borås in 1963. He was educated at the Swedish Infantry Cadet and Officer Candidate School and became second lieutenant in Älvsborg Regiment after graduating from the Royal Military Academy in 1966.

== Career ==
Hederstedt was commissioned as an officer in 1966 and was assigned to Älvsborg Regiment (I 15) in Borås, until 1969, and then again from 1973 to 1976. He attended the Swedish Infantry Cadet School from 1969 to 1972 and underwent the Higher Staff Course at the Swedish Armed Forces Staff College from 1974 to 1976 and held aspirant positions in the central staffs and troop service at Älvsborg Regiment and Northern Småland Regiment (I 12) in Eksjö. Hederstedt was serving at the Defense Staff's Operations Department, responsible of operational planning, from 1976 to 1981. He served as chief of staff of the Swedish UN Battalion of the United Nations Peacekeeping Force in Cyprus (UNFICYP) in Cyprus in 1981. From 1981 to 1982 he was company commander in the Northern Småland Regiment and from 1982 to 1986 he served as the head of the Defense Staff's Quartermaster Department. Hederstedt was battalion commander at Bohuslän Regiment (I 17) in Uddevalla from 1986 to 1988 when he was promoted to colonel.

Hederstedt was appointed battalion commander of the Swedish UN Battalion of the United Nations Interim Force in Lebanon (UNIFIL) in Lebanon in 1988. In Lebanon, Hederstedt conducted many negotiations on various levels with several of the factions (e.g., PLO, PFLP, Hezbollah, Black September, Amal, etc. and Israeli supported Christian guerrilla parties). He was commanding officer of the Life Guards Brigade (MekIB 1) at Svea Life Guards (I 1) in Kungsängen from 1988 to 1993. Between 1989 and 1992 Hederstedt was also the Course Director for UN Nordic Staff officers courses dealing with guerilla warfare. He also conducted fact-finding trips to troublespots, including Cyprus, Kuwait, Iraq, Iran, and the Middle East (Israel, Gaza, and Lebanon). Hederstedt was commanding officer of the Western Army Division in Skövde from 1993 to 1996. Hederstedt was promoted to major general in 1996 and was appointed International Operations Commander at the Swedish Armed Forces Headquarters.

In May 1997, Hederstedt led a Partnership for Peace exercise in Germany with 1,900 officers from 28 countries. In 1997 he also became military adviser to the Minister for Defence Björn von Sydow and in 1998 he was promoted to lieutenant general. Hederstedt accompanied Björn von Sydow on several trips to Angola, Namibia, South Africa, Kenya, Morocco, Congo, Uganda where they met with government leaders and members of opposition parties. During the 1990s, Hederstedt was also on the ground monitoring the Balkan conflict. He was responsible for the Swedish participation in Bosnia and Herzegovina, Macedonia, and Kosovo. There he met with the leaders of many guerrilla movements and studied their organisations and command structures. Hederstedt reported to the Swedish government from the ground about the war in 1998 and 1999. Hederstedt was appointed Supreme Commander of the Swedish Armed Forces on 1 July 2000 and simultaneously promoted to general.

During his time as Supreme Commander Hederstedt executed the largest transformation of the Swedish Armed Forces in modern time. This included a change from a defence of invasion to a more flexible response defence, a radical change including a strong internationalization of the whole defence. During 2001 Hederstedt was President in the European Union Military Committee. He was in this capacity the chairman of the chiefs of defence of European Union. During this time the European Union military structure and capacity was formed and developed. During his time as Supreme Commander, he developed and set the basics of a new organisational and technical worked based structure of the Swedish defence. The change of the defence also concluded a complete integration of the military services. A total regional logistic solution was also phased out and was replaced by a solution based on a complete overview which created large rationality and further improvement. Hederstedt left the position of Supreme Commander and retired from the military on 31 December 2003.

== Post-retirement ==
Hederstedt became partner of Gaia Leadership in 2004. In December 2004 Hederstedt got the mission of the Swedish government to coordinate and organise the aid work in Thailand after the Tsunami disaster. The primarily responsibility was to send home deceased Swedish citizens. Hederstedt served as chairman of the Modern Pentathlon Federation of Sweden from 2006 to 2011. He was elected as a member of the board of the Swedish Childhood Cancer Fund (Barncancerfonden) in May 2005 and served as its chairman from October 2005 until June 2010.

== Personal life ==
In 1995, Hederstedt married Birgitta Harvyl (born 1953), the daughter of Stig Harvyl and Ulla (née Östlund). His wife is a former planning director of the executive board of the National Board of Health and Welfare and former Regional Director of Halland. Hederstedt has four children from a previous marriage. One of his sons are colonel Peter Hederstedt, commander of the Western Military Region (2018–present).

== Dates of rank ==
- 1966 – Second lieutenant
- 1968 – Lieutenant
- 1972 – Captain
- 1976 – Major
- 1983 – Lieutenant colonel
- 1988 – Colonel
- 1993 – Senior colonel
- 1996 – Major general
- 1998 – Lieutenant general
- 2000 – General

== Awards and decorations ==
=== Swedish ===
- (Sweden) H. M. The King's Medal, 12th size gold medal worn around the neck on a chain of gold (2005)
- (Sweden) For Zealous and Devoted Service of the Realm
- (Sweden) Swedish Armed Forces Conscript Medal
- (Sweden) Commemorative Medal of the Nobel Prize to the UN Peacekeeping Forces (Medaljen till minne av Nobels fredspris till FNs fredsbevarande styrkor, NobelFNSMM)
- (Sweden) Swedish Veterans Federation (Peace Berets) Medal of Merit in silver (Fredsbaskrarna Sveriges förtjänstmedalj i silver, FredbSvSM) (23 March 2002)

=== Foreign ===
- (France) Commander of the Legion of Honour (3 April 2003)
- (Portugal) Commander of the Order of Prince Henry (15 May 1991)
- (Estonia) 1st Class of the Order of the Cross of the Eagle (5 February 2004)
- United Nations Medal (UNFICYP)
- United Nations Medal (UNIFIL)

== Honours ==
- Member of the Royal Swedish Academy of War Sciences (1998)
- President of the Swedish Childhood Cancer Foundation
- President of the Swedish Modern Penthalon Federation

Military offices
Preceded by Per Källström	Western Army Division; 1993–1996	Succeeded by Sven-Eric Andersson
Preceded by Owe Wiktorin	Supreme Commander of the Swedish Armed Forces; 2000–2003	Succeeded by Håkan Syrén
