= Stefan Kristiansson =

Swedish Army officer

- Born: Nils Stefan Kristiansson; 25 September 1951 (age 75); Malmö, Sweden
- Military career
- Allegiance: Sweden
- Branch: Swedish Army
- Service years: 1976–2012
- Rank: Major General
- Commands: Coordination Dep., SAFHQ; Deputy Director of Military Intelligence and Security; Director of Military Intelligence and Security

Major General Nils Stefan Kristiansson (born 25 September 1951) is a retired Swedish Army officer. He served as Director of Military Intelligence and Security from 2007 to 2012.

== Early life ==
Kristiansson was born on 25 September 1951 in Saint John Parish (Sankt Johannes församling) in Malmö, Sweden. Kristiansson passed gymnasieexamen in 1974.

== Career ==
Kristiansson graduated from the Military Academy Karlberg in 1976 and was commissioned as an officer in Halland Regiment the same year as a lieutenant, where he served until 1984. He attended school for regimental officers from 1978 to 1979 and was promoted to captain in 1979. He attended the General Course at the Swedish Armed Forces Staff College from 1982 to 1983 and the 1983 UN Military Observer Course and was promoted to major in 1984. From 1984 to 1986, Kristiansson was posted as a UN observer in Kashmir within the framework of the United Nations Military Observer Group in India and Pakistan (UNMOGIP). From 1986 to 1988, he attended the Army's senior staff course at the Swedish Armed Forces Staff College, after which he served in the Operations Section 5 of the Operations Command in the Defence Staff from 1988 to 1989. Kristiansson was posted as company commander in Halland Regiment from 1989 to 1990, office head in the Planning Section in the Army Staff from 1990 to 1994 and office head in the Coordination Section in the Army Command at the Swedish Armed Forces Headquarters in 1994. He was promoted to lieutenant colonel in 1993. Kristiansson then served as deputy commander of the Småland Brigade (Smålandsbrigaden) from 1994 to 1995 and became a Överstelöjtnant med särskild tjänsteställning in 1995. He attended the International Training Course in Security Policy at the Graduate Institute of International and Development Studies in Geneva from 1995 to 1996, after which he was project manager at the Swedish Army Staff and Communication Center (Arméns lednings- och sambandscentrum, LSC).

In 1998 he was promoted to colonel and from 1998 to 2001 he was defence attaché at the embassy in Helsinki and in Tallinn. He was promoted to brigadier general in 2001 and was a military adviser at the Ministry for Foreign Affairs from 2001 to 2003 and head of the Coordination Department at the Swedish Armed Forces Headquarters from 2003 to 2004. Kristiansson served as Deputy Director of Military Intelligence and Security from May 2004 to June 2007. In 2007, he was promoted to major general and from June 2007 to 30 September 2012 he served as Director of Military Intelligence and Security and head of the Swedish Military Intelligence and Security Service (MUST).

Kristiansson was chairman of the Swedish Pistol Shooting Association (Svenska pistolskytteförbundet) from 2012 to 2020.

== Dates of rank ==
- 1976 – Lieutenant
- 1979 – Captain
- 1984 – Major
- 1993 – Lieutenant colonel
- 1995 – Överstelöjtnant med särskild tjänsteställning
- 1998 – Colonel
- 2001 – Brigadier general
- 2007 – Major general

== Awards and decorations ==
- (France) Officer of the Legion of Honour (20 January 2012)
- (Estonia) 3rd Class of the Order of the Cross of the Eagle (4 February 2002)

Military offices
Preceded by Håkan Pettersson	Deputy Director of Military Intelligence and Security; 2004–2007	Succeeded by Mats Engman
Preceded by Håkan Pettersson	Director of Military Intelligence and Security; 2007–2017	Succeeded by Gunnar Karlson
