= Sverker Göranson =

Retired Swedish Army officer (born 1954)

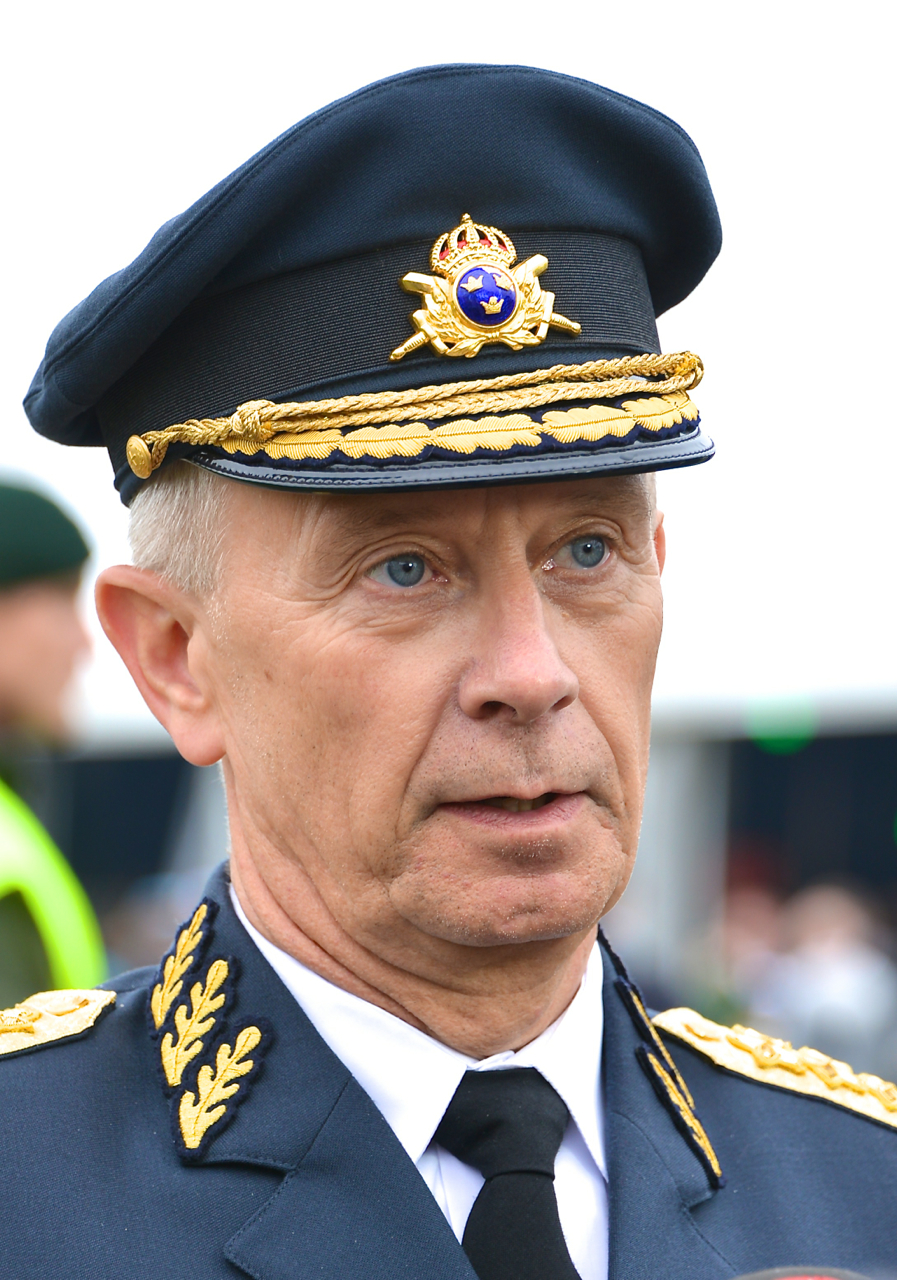
- Sverker Göranson on Veterans Day out on Djurgården in Stockholm, 29 May 2013.
- Born: Sverker John Olof Göranson; 3 May 1954 (age 72); Lund, Sweden
- Military career
- Allegiance: Sweden
- Branch: Swedish Army
- Service years: 1975–2015
- Rank: General
- Commands: Chief of Defence Staff; Inspector of the Army; Supreme Commander
- Conflicts: Yugoslav Wars
- Awards: Legion of Merit, United Nations Medal, NATO Medal etc

General Sverker John Olof Göranson (born 3 May 1954) is a retired Swedish Army officer. Sverkerson was commissioned as an officer in 1977. During the 1990s, Göranson embarked on an international career. He completed the Swedish National Defence College's Command Course and attended several courses in international humanitarian law before relocating to the United States Army Command and General Staff College in Fort Leavenworth, Kansas. In 1994, he also completed the United Nations Staff Officers Course. Notably, Göranson served as the Chief of Staff in Nordbat 2/BA 05 within the United Nations Protection Force (UNPROFOR) in Bosnia from 1995 to 1996 and later as the Deputy Battalion Commander in Swebat within the Implementation Force (IFOR) in Bosnia and Herzegovina in 1996. Upon his return to Sweden, Göranson assumed the position of Deputy Brigade Commander at the Scanian Brigade and later became the Brigade Commander of the Life Guards Brigade before taking up the role of Military Attaché and Assistant Defence Attaché in Washington, D.C. He assumed the position of Supreme Commander of the Swedish Armed Forces in 2009.

Göranson's tenure as Supreme Commander, like his predecessors, was marked by budget cuts and the transition from a focus on territorial defence to an expeditionary defence strategy. On multiple occasions, Göranson voiced his criticism of this transition and the financial constraints facing the Swedish Armed Forces. He even went so far as to suggest that an entire branch of the military might have to be disbanded unless additional funds were allocated, emphasizing the necessity of increased budgetary allocations starting from 2015.

== Career ==
Göranson was born in Lund, Sweden, the son of Sven-Eric Göranson, a Natural science teacher, school leader and principal at Komvux, and Margit, a language teacher (1921–2005). He soon moved with his parents to Kristianstad. He graduated from Österängsskolan in 1973, which followed by technical high school in Hässleholm before enrolling at Chalmers University of Technology in Gothenburg in 1974. There he studied pedagogic, psychology and sociology and graduated in 1975 with a college examina in engineering. In June 1974 he started his mandatory conscription and served as a platoon leader at North Scanian Regiment (P 6) in his hometown of Kristianstad, followed by the Swedish Armoured Troops Cadet and Officer Candidate School (PKAS) at Göta Life Guards (P 1) in Enköping.

== Career ==
He enrolled at the Military Academy Karlberg in 1975 and graduated in 1977, finishing first in his class. Göranson was commissioned as 1st Lieutenant and served as a main battle tanks instructor. Göranson was promoted to captain in 1980 and passed the Basic Course at the Swedish Armed Forces Staff College from 1983 to 1984, when he was promoted to major. He then passed the General Staff Course at the Swedish Armed Forces Staff College from 1985 to 1987, finishing first in his class. Göranson served as a staff officer at the Southern Military District (Milo S) from 1987 to 1989 and then as a staff officer at the Swedish Armed Forces Headquarters Staff for Joint Operations (Operationsledningen, OPL) from 1989 to 1991. In 1990 he passed the 31st Military Course on Law of Armed Conflicts and the Basic Course at the Swedish National Defence College.

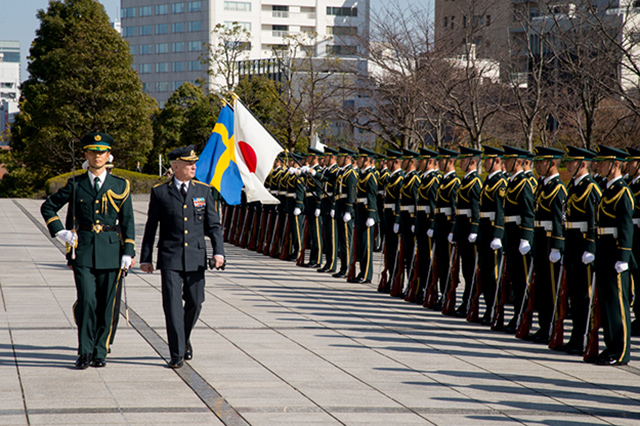
Göranson visit the Japan Ministry of Defense in Tokyo, 2 March 2015.

From 1991 to 1993 Göranson was Deputy Project Manager, Tactical Evaluation of the main battle tank for the Swedish Army and was promoted to lieutenant colonel. He attended the United States Army Command and General Staff College at Fort Leavenworth in Kansas, United States from 1993 to 1994 where he was one of the foremost among the foreign students. Göranson was later inducted into the Fort Leavenworth International Hall of Fame in 2008. Göranson passed the UN Staff Officer Course in 1994 and was a senior teacher of army tactics at the Swedish Armed Forces Staff College from 1994 to 1995. Göranson was then chief of staff of the Nordic Battalion 2 (Nordbat 2)/BA 05 in the United Nations Protection Force (UNPROFOR) in Bosnia and Herzegovina late 1995. In early 1996 he was deputy battalion commander of Swebat in the Implementation Force (IFOR) in Bosnia and Herzegovina. Back in Sweden, he was deputy brigade commander of Southern Scania Brigade (Södra skånska brigaden, MekB 7) from 1996 to 1997 when he was promoted to colonel.

Göranson was brigade commander of the Life Guards Brigade (Livgardesbrigaden) in Stockholm from 1997 to 2000 and did the Senior Level Leadership Management Course in 1998/1999. He was military and assistant defence attaché to the United States from 2000 to 2003 when he was promoted to brigadier general. Göranson did the Civilian/Military Command Course Senior Level in 2003 and was then assistant chief for defence planning and operations at the Swedish Armed Forces Headquarters from 2003 to 2005. In 2004 he did the Danish Chief of Defence Security Policy Course and from 2005 to 2007 he served as Inspector of the Swedish Army. Göranson served as Chief of Defence Staff and Chief of Staff of the Armed Forces (Försvarsmaktens stabschef) from 2007 to 2009 before being appointed Supreme Commander of the Swedish Armed Forces on 6 March 2009. He took office of 25 March 2009. Göranson was Supreme Commander of the Swedish Armed Forces for 6 years before he was succeeded by Micael Bydén on 1 October 2015.

== Post-retirement ==
From 1 April 2016 Göranson worked with a group of advisors to the Saab Group in the United States and on 18 May 2016 he became a board member of Invidzonen, an organization for relatives of Swedish personnel employed by the Swedish Armed Forces and the police force serving abroad. On 1 March 2017 he became chairman of the board of the Nordic Travel Group. On 9 March 2017 Göranson, together with Ari Puheloinen, was awarded the "2017 Promoter of the Year of Relations Between Sweden and Finland" by the Sweden-Finland Society (Samfundet Sverige-Finland). On 27 March 2017 Göranson was elected chairman of the Swedish Veterans Association (Sveriges Veteranförbund). He is also a board member of the chemical intelligence company Serstech AB. In 2018, Göranson was elected president of the Royal Swedish Academy of War Sciences.

== Personal life ==
In 1976 he married Ann (born 1955) and they have two children (daughter born 1983, son born 1985).

== Dates of rank ==
Göranson's promotions:

- 1977 – Lieutenant
- 1980 – Captain
- 1984 – Major
- 1993 – Lieutenant Colonel
- 1997 – Colonel
- 2003 – Brigadier General
- 2005 – Major General
- 2007 – Lieutenant General
- 2009 – General

== Awards and decorations ==
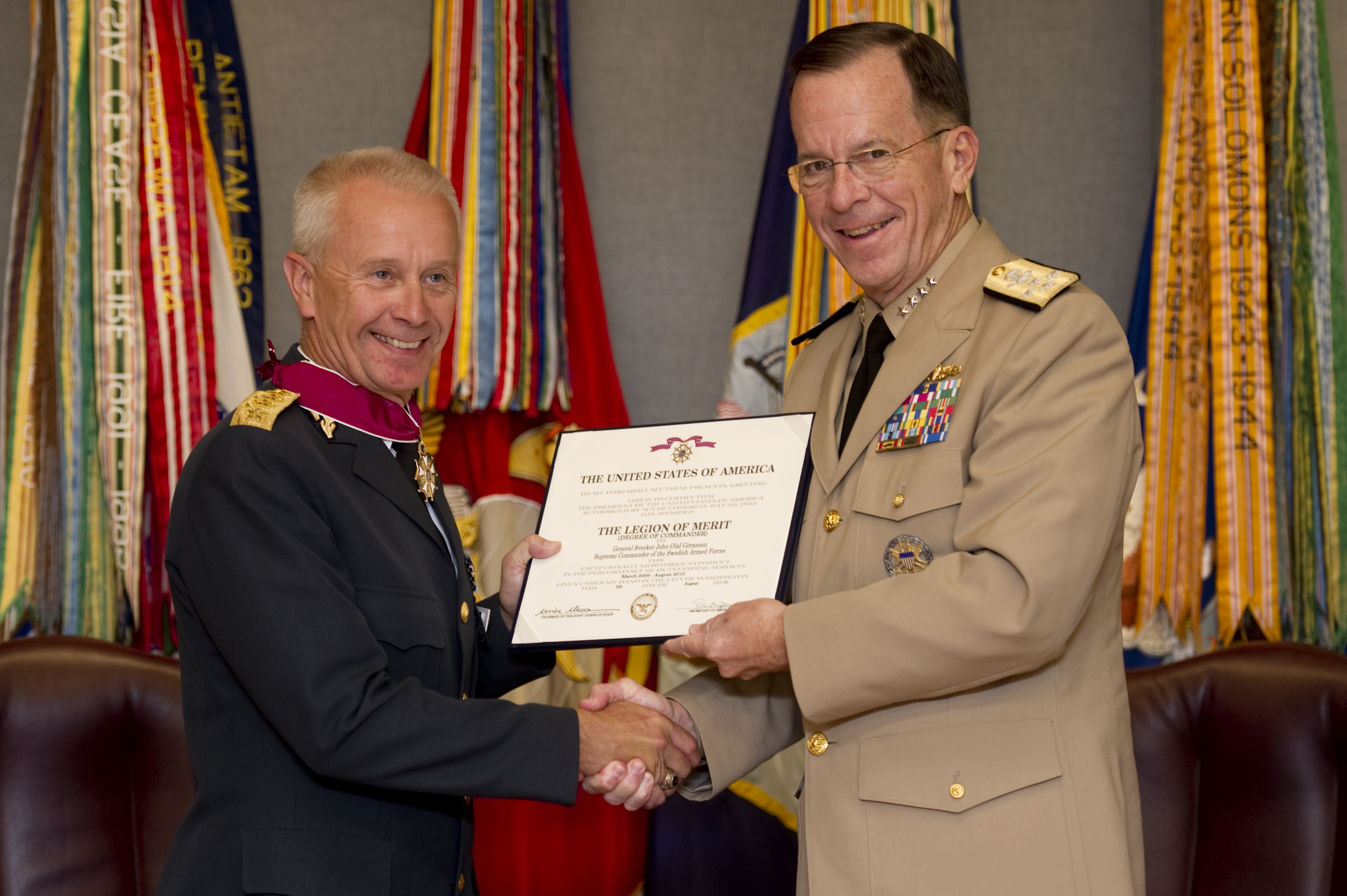
Admiral Michael Mullen, chairman of the Joint Chiefs of Staff congratulates Sverker Göranson after presenting him with the Legion of Merit at The Pentagon on 5 August 2010.

Göranson's decorations:

=== Swedish ===
- (Sweden) H. M. The King's Medal, 12th size gold medal with chain (2016)
- (Sweden) For Zealous and Devoted Service of the Realm
- (Sweden) Swedish Armed Forces Conscript Medal
- (Sweden) Swedish Armed Forces International Service Medal
- (Sweden) Home Guard Medal of Merit
- (Sweden) North Scanian Regiment Commemorative Medal (Norra skånska regementets minnesmedalj)
- (Sweden) Swedish Reserve Officers Federation Merit Badge (Förbundet Sveriges Reservofficerares förtjänsttecken)
- (Sweden) Old Comrades Alliance of the Swedish Korea Ambulance Cross of Remembrance and Merit
- (Sweden) Life Guards Dragoons Medal of Merit
- (Sweden) Life Guards Medal of Merit
- (Sweden) Katanga Cross (Katangakorset), UN Veterans Congo's honorary pin

=== Foreign ===
- Grand Cross of the Order of the Lion of Finland (2013)
- (Norway) Commander with star of the Royal Norwegian Order of Merit (2 March 2012)
- (Germany) Gold Cross of Honour of the Bundeswehr
- (France) Commander of the Legion of Honour
- (United States) Commander of the Legion of Merit (2005)
- (United States) Officer of the Legion of Merit (2003)
- Knight Commander's Cross of the Order of Merit of the Federal Republic of Germany (2014)
- United Nations Medal in bronze (UNPROFOR)
- NATO Medal (IFOR)
- (Italy) Italian CHOD Order of Merit for International Operations (Medaglia d'onore interforze dello Stato Maggiore Difesa)
- (Finland) Finnish Freedom Fighters' Blue Cross
- United States Army Command and General Staff Officer Course Badge

== Honours ==
- Member of the Royal Swedish Academy of War Sciences (2002)
- President of the Royal Swedish Academy of War Sciences (2018–2022)
- Member of the International Hall of Fame at the United States Army Command and General Staff College (2008)
- Honorary Subaltern of the Life Guards (2008)

Military offices
Preceded by Alf Sandqvist	Inspector of the Army; 2005–2007	Succeeded by Berndt Grundevik
Preceded by Mats Nilsson	Chief of Defence Staff; 2007–2009	Succeeded by Jan Salestrand
Preceded by Håkan Syrén	Supreme Commander of the Swedish Armed Forces; 2009–2015	Succeeded by Micael Bydén
Professional and academic associations
Preceded by Mikael Odenberg	President of the Royal Swedish Academy of War Sciences; 2018–2022	Succeeded by Björn von Sydow
