= Håkan Syrén =

Swedish general and supreme commander (born 1952)

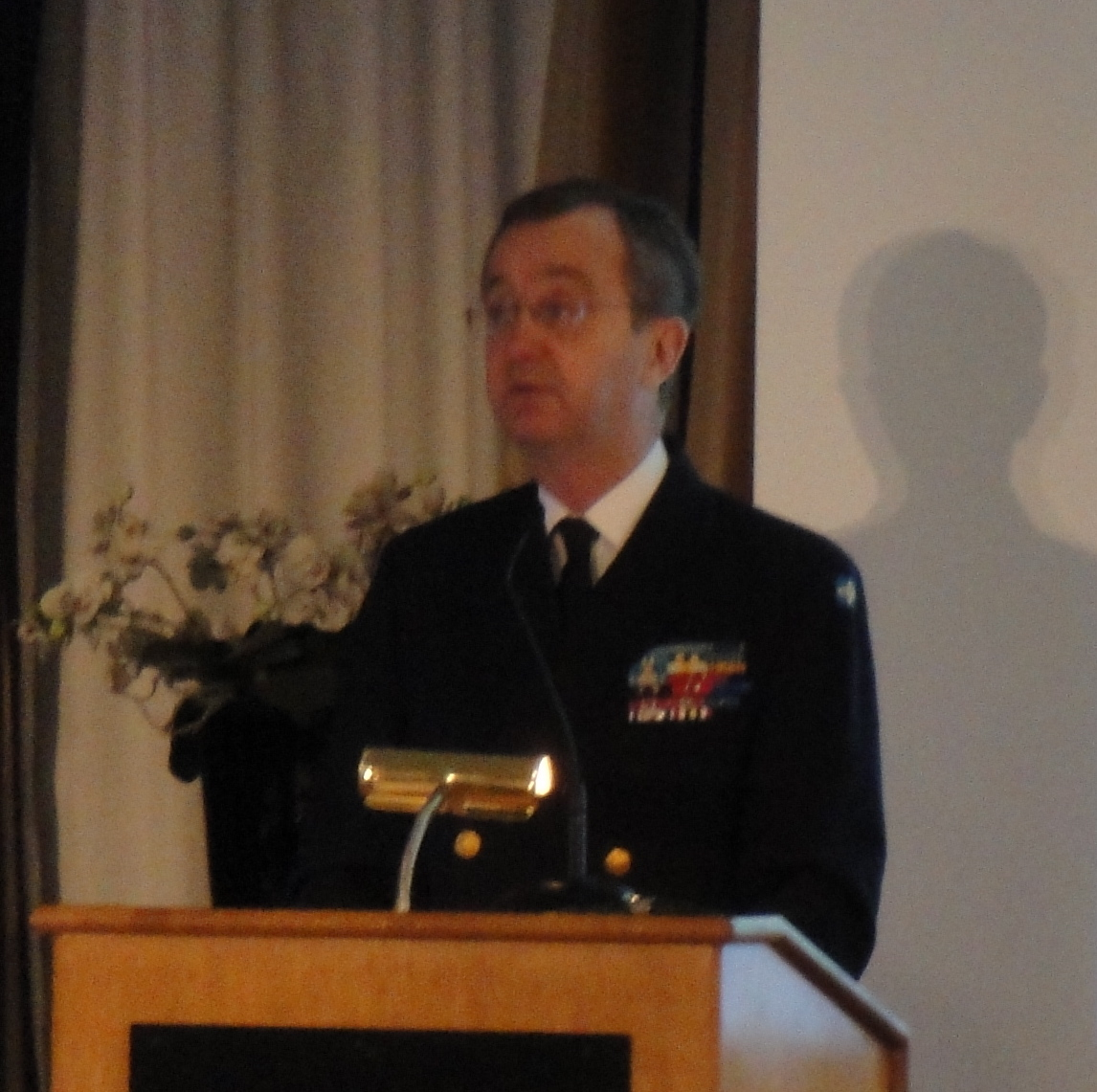
- Syrén in 2010.
- Born: Håkan Erik Gunnar Syrén; 31 January 1952 (age 74); Växjö, Sweden
- Military career
- Allegiance: Sweden
- Branch: Amphibious Corps (Swedish Navy)
- Service years: 1970–2012
- Rank: General
- Commands: Vaxholm Coastal Artillery Regiment; Director of Military Intelligence and Security; Supreme Commander; Chairman of EUMC
- Other work: ADC to His Majesty the King

General Håkan Erik Gunnar Syrén (born 31 January 1952) is a retired Swedish Navy officer. Syrén graduated from the Royal Swedish Naval Academy in 1973 and began his career as an instructor and platoon commander at the Vaxholm Coastal Artillery Regiment. After advanced studies in Sweden and at the U.S. Naval War College, he held key posts including teacher of strategy, head of planning at the Naval Staff, and commanding officer of both the Marine Amphibious Battalion and the Vaxholm Coastal Artillery Regiment. He later served as head of operations planning at Swedish Armed Forces Headquarters and in 1999 was promoted to major general, becoming Director of Military Intelligence and Security.

In 2004, Syrén was appointed Supreme Commander of the Swedish Armed Forces, a position he held until 2009. He then became Chairman of the European Union Military Committee (2009–2012), the EU's highest military post. Following his service, he founded his own consultancy, In General AB, and has remained active in strategic and defense-related advisory roles. His career established him not only as a leading figure in Swedish defense but also as a respected military leader on the international stage.

== Early life ==
Syrén was born in Växjö, Sweden, the son of Lieutenant Colonel Gunnar Syrén and his wife Siv Syrén. He grew up in Uppsala, where he graduated from Lundellska läroverket in 1970.

== Career ==
=== Military career ===
Syrén studied at the Royal Swedish Naval Academy from which he graduated in 1973. He was then instructor and platoon commander at the Vaxholm Coastal Artillery Regiment (KA 1) from 1973 to 1979 and studied at the Military Academy Karlberg in Stockholm from 1980 to 1984. Syrén was a staff officer at the Naval Staff in Stockholm from 1984 to 1988 and was a student at the Naval War College in Newport, Rhode Island, USA from 1988 to 1989. Back in Sweden, he was teacher of strategy at the Military Academy Karlberg from 1989 to 1990 and head of the Planning Department at the Naval Staff from 1990 to 1992. Syrén was then commanding officer of the Marine Amphibious Battalion from 1992 to 1994 and commanding officer of the Vaxholm Coastal Artillery Regiment from 1994 to 1996.

Syrén was head of Operations Planning Department at the Swedish Armed Forces Headquarters from 1996 to 1998. In 1997 he completed a management course at the Swedish Defence University and in 1999 he completed the Senior International Defence Management Course (SIDMC) at the Naval Postgraduate School in Monterey, California, USA. Back in Sweden, Syrén served as secretary to the Defence Commission at the Ministry of Defence in 1999. On 1 October 1999, Syrén was promoted to major general and assumed the position of Director of Military Intelligence and Security at the Swedish Armed Forces Headquarters. He served in this position until 2003.

In 2004, Syrén was appointed Supreme Commander of the Swedish Armed Forces. His appointment lasted until 31 December 2009. On 25 March 2009 he was succeeded by Sverker Göranson as Supreme Commander. On 29 October 2008, the Chiefs of Defence meeting of the European Union Military Committee (EUMC) endorsed Syrén as the next chairman of the EUMC. In the position as CEUMC he was formally appointed by the Council of the European Union for a period of three years and succeeded general Henri Bentégeat on 6 November 2009. His appointment lasted until November 2012 and after this, he started his consulting firm In General AB the same year.

=== Other work ===
Syrén was ADC to His Majesty the King from 1988 to 1996. He became a member of the Royal Swedish Society of Naval Sciences in 1993 and of the Royal Swedish Academy of War Sciences in 1996. Syrén became a member of the International Institute for Strategic Studies in 1997 and is a member of the Swedish Society for International Affairs (Utrikespolitiska samfundet). In December 2012 he became a senior advisor to the Swedish Space Corporation (SSC) and the following year he became a board member of the SSC.

== Personal life ==
Syrén is married to Birgitta and together they have three children.

== Positions ==
- 1973–1979: Instructor and Platoon Commander at the Vaxholm Coastal Artillery Regiment
- 1980–1984: Student at the Military Academy Karlberg, Stockholm
- 1984–1988: Staff Officer at the Naval Staff, Stockholm
- 1988–1989: Student at the Naval War College, Newport, USA
- 1989–1990: Teacher of Strategy at the Military Academy Karlberg, Stockholm
- 1990–1992: Head of Planning Department, Naval Staff, Stockholm
- 1992–1994: Commanding officer of the Marine Amphibious Battalion
- 1994–1996: Commanding officer of the Vaxholm Coastal Artillery Regiment
- 1996–1998: Head of Operations Planning Department, Swedish Armed Forces Headquarters
- 1999–1999: Secretary to the Defence Commission, Ministry of Defence
- 1999–2003: Director of Military Intelligence and Security, Swedish Armed Forces Headquarters
- 2004–2009: Supreme Commander of the Swedish Armed Forces
- 2009–2012: Chairman of the European Union Military Committee

== Promotions ==
Syréns promotions:

- 1973 – Lieutenant
- 1976 – Captain
- 1983 – Major
- 1988 – Lieutenant colonel
- 1994 – Colonel
- 1996 – Senior colonel
- 1 October 1999 – Major general
- 2000 – Lieutenant general
- 2004 – General

== Awards and decorations ==
=== Swedish ===
- (Sweden) H. M. The King's Medal, 12th size gold medal worn around the neck on a chain of gold (2009)
- (Sweden) H. M. The King's Medal, 8th size gold (silver-gilt) medal worn on the chest suspended by the Order of the Seraphim ribbon (1994)
- (Sweden) For Zealous and Devoted Service of the Realm
- (Sweden) Swedish Home Guard Medal of Merit
- (Sweden) Swedish Women's Voluntary Defence Organization Royal Medal of Merit in gold (22 November 2008)
- (Sweden) Coastal Ranger Association Medal of Merit (Förbundet Kustjägarnas förtjänstmedalj) in silver (2006)

=== Foreign ===
- Grand Cross of the Order of the Lion of Finland (2009)
- (Norway) Grand Cross of the Royal Norwegian Order of Merit (15 April 2009)
- (France) Commander of the Legion of Honour (27 June 2006)
- Grand Decoration of Honour in Silver for Services to the Republic of Austria (2003)

Military offices
Preceded by Claes-Göran Hedén	Vaxholm Coastal Artillery Regiment; 1994–1996	Succeeded by Stefan Jontell
Preceded by Erik Rossander	Director of Military Intelligence and Security; 1999–2003	Succeeded by Håkan Pettersson
Preceded by Johan Hederstedt	Supreme Commander of the Swedish Armed Forces; 2004–2009	Succeeded by Sverker Göranson
Preceded by Henri Bentégeat	Chairman of the European Union Military Committee; 2009–2012	Succeeded by Patrick de Rousiers
