= STRIL =

Integrated system for aerial warfare control

STRIL's coat of arms.

[Swedish] Tactical (Fighting Command) and Air Defence Control System (Swedish: Stridsledning och luftbevakning, STRIL, lit. 'Combat control and air surveillance') in forms of STRIL 50 (operational in the 1950s) and STRIL 60 (operational in the 1960s, 1970s and 1980s) were integrated systems for aerial warfare control including early warning radar and ground-controlled interception. The systems depended on radar and radio as primary technologies but STRIL 50 was based on manual control while STRIL 60 applied the usage of early digital computers.

STRIL 60, designed in cooperation with Marconi Company, were in the very frontline of providing combat critical information to airborne aircraft, the Saab 35 Draken and Saab J32 Lansen fighter aircraft, by means of digital telemetry links with direct presentation of target guidance data on dedicated gauges on the cockpit instrument panel. The uplink to the aircraft could resist heavy jamming and the Swedish Air Force was first in the world to provide digital combat guidance that would remain reliable in a hostile and interfered radio environment.

The computerised command and control system in combination with the datalink brought the time from target detection to guidance commands reaching a fighter aircraft down to 5–6 seconds. In the Stril 50 system with manual plotting and voice communication this had been 30–60 seconds.

Eventually, the Saab 37 Viggen aircraft system also utilized STRIL 60 but target presentation in the cockpit was then replaced by digital computer displays instead of the mechanical gauges used on the Draken.

In the 1990s, STRIL 60 was replaced by STRIL 90 which is a modern combat control system integrated with the Saab S100B Argus combat control/surveillance and SAAB JAS 39 Gripen multi-role combat aircraft.

== See also ==
- sv:STRIL 50
- sv:STRIL 60
