= Chief of Defence (Sweden) =

Highest-ranking professional military officer in the Swedish Armed Forces

Chief of Defence of the Swedish Armed Forces
- Överbefälhavaren
- Command flag of the Chief of Defence

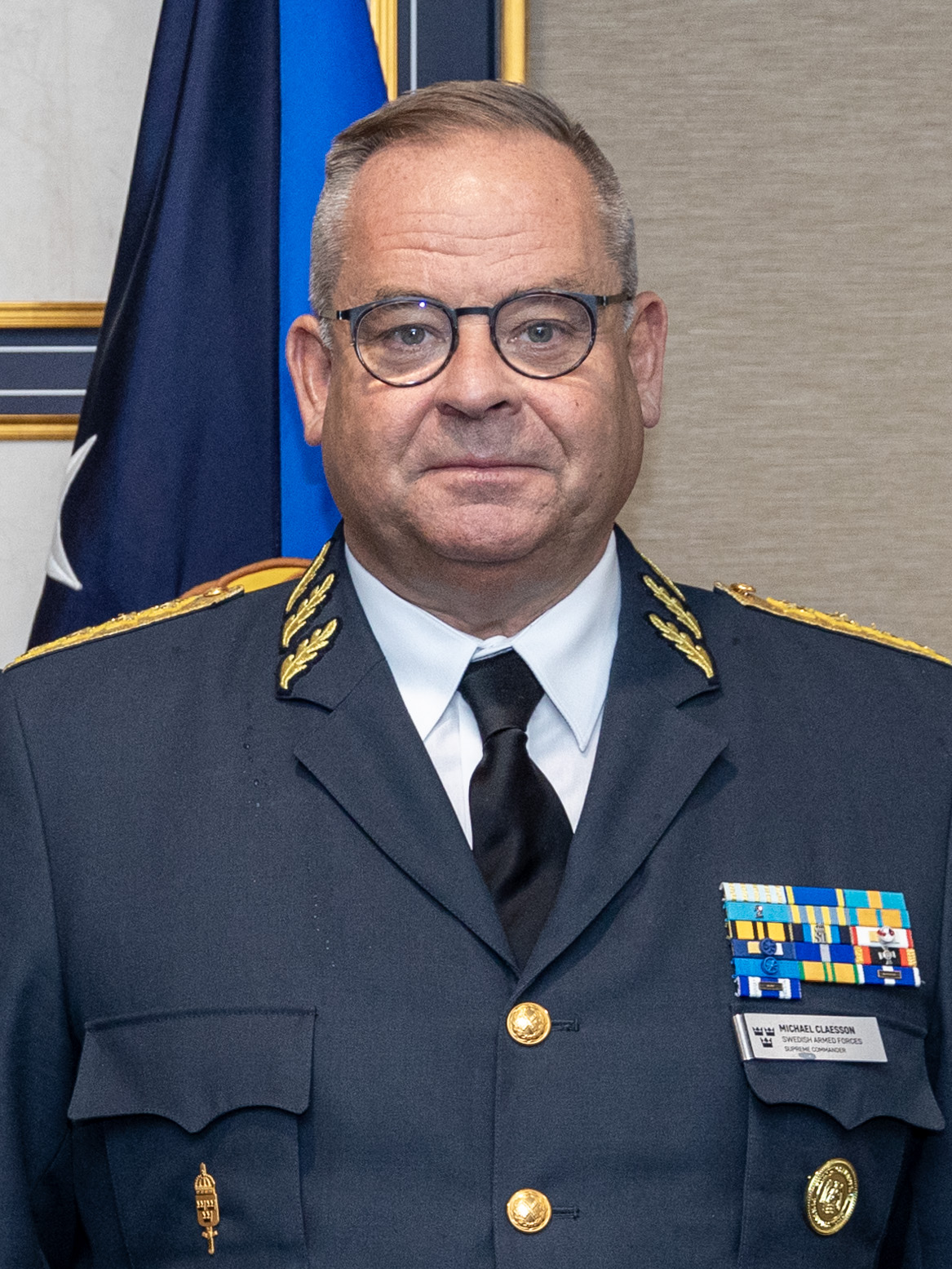
- Incumbent; General Michael Claesson since 1 October 2024
- Swedish Armed Forces
- Reports to: The Government (in practice through the Minister for Defence)
- Residence: Karlberg Palace
- Seat: Lidingövägen 24, Stockholm, Sweden
- Nominator: Minister for Defence
- Appointer: The Government
- Constituting instrument: Förordning (2007:1266) med instruktion för Försvarsmakten (current ordinance)
- Precursor: None (Note: There was no single career officer in charge of all the forces before the creation of this position (all senior service commanders reported directly to the King and his Council).)
- Formation: 8 December 1939
- First holder: Olof Thörnell
- Deputy: Director General of the Swedish Armed Forces
- Website: Official website

The Chief of Defence (Swedish: överbefälhavaren; acronym: ÖB), formerly referred to in English as the Supreme Commander of the Swedish Armed Forces (Note: Chief of Defence has been used in English since Sweden joined NATO in 2024. Prior to this, the title Supreme Commander of the Swedish Armed Forces was used. See sources here:. The Swedish title remains "överbefälhavaren", rather than being changed to "försvarschefen".), is the highest ranked professional military officer in the Swedish Armed Forces. The chief of defence is the agency head of the Swedish Armed Forces and formally reports to the Government of Sweden, though normally through the minister for defence. (Note: Although the minister for defence heads the Ministry of Defence, the minister cannot as a general rule issue directives in his/her own right to the chief of defence or any other agency director-general in the defence portfolio due to the Swedish prohibition on ministerial rule, unless such authority is provided for in specific statutory provisions.) The primary responsibilities and duties of the chief of defence (and the charter for the Armed Forces) are prescribed in an ordinance issued by the Government.

The present Chief of Defence, General Michael Claesson, took office on 1 October 2024. His appointment marked the adoption of the title "chief of defence" in English-language usage, in line with NATO terminology.

== History ==
Before the modern era, the King was expected to command the forces himself; not seldom on location during war campaigns as shown by Gustavus Adolphus, Charles X, Charles XI, Charles XII and Gustav III. This remained the case formally until the 20th century. From the late 19th century onwards, there were no service chiefs of the Army or Navy; all senior service commanders reported directly to the King in Council. Apart from a single minister for defence created in 1919 by merging the position of ministers of the land forces and naval forces, no joint command structure existed.

In 1936, a Supreme Commander was intended to be appointed in war-time-only, and on 1 December 1939, during World War II, the first Supreme Commander, General Olof Thörnell, was appointed. In 1942 it was decided to keep this office even after the end of the war. The Supreme Commander would in wartime formally report to the King in Council until the enactment of the new Instrument of Government in 1974, and after 1 January 1975 to the Swedish government.

The supreme commander position was renamed chief of defence in 2024. The chief of defence is, apart from the honorary ranks held by the King of Sweden and in the past other members of the Swedish royal family, by unwritten convention normally the only professional military officer on active duty to hold the highest rank (a four-star general or admiral). An exception was made 2009–2014 when General Håkan Syrén was chairman of the European Union Military Committee. During the 20th century, there have been more examples where other senior officers have held the rank of general in addition to the supreme commander. (Note: See General (Sweden)#History for more examples.)

== Heraldry ==
The coat of arms of the supreme commander was used from 1991 to 1993. It has since 1993 been used by the Swedish Armed Forces and was used from 1994 to 2001 by the Swedish Armed Forces Headquarters. Blazon: "Azure, lesser coat of arms of Sweden, three open crowns or placed two and one. The shield surmounting an erect sword of the last colour".

Coat of arms of the supreme commander used 1991 to 1993.

The command flag of the chief of defence is drawn by Brita Grep and embroidered by hand by the Kedja studio, Heraldica. Blazon: "Fessed in blue and yellow; on blue three open yellow crowns placed two and one, on yellow two blue batons of command with sets of open yellow crowns placed two and one in saltire."

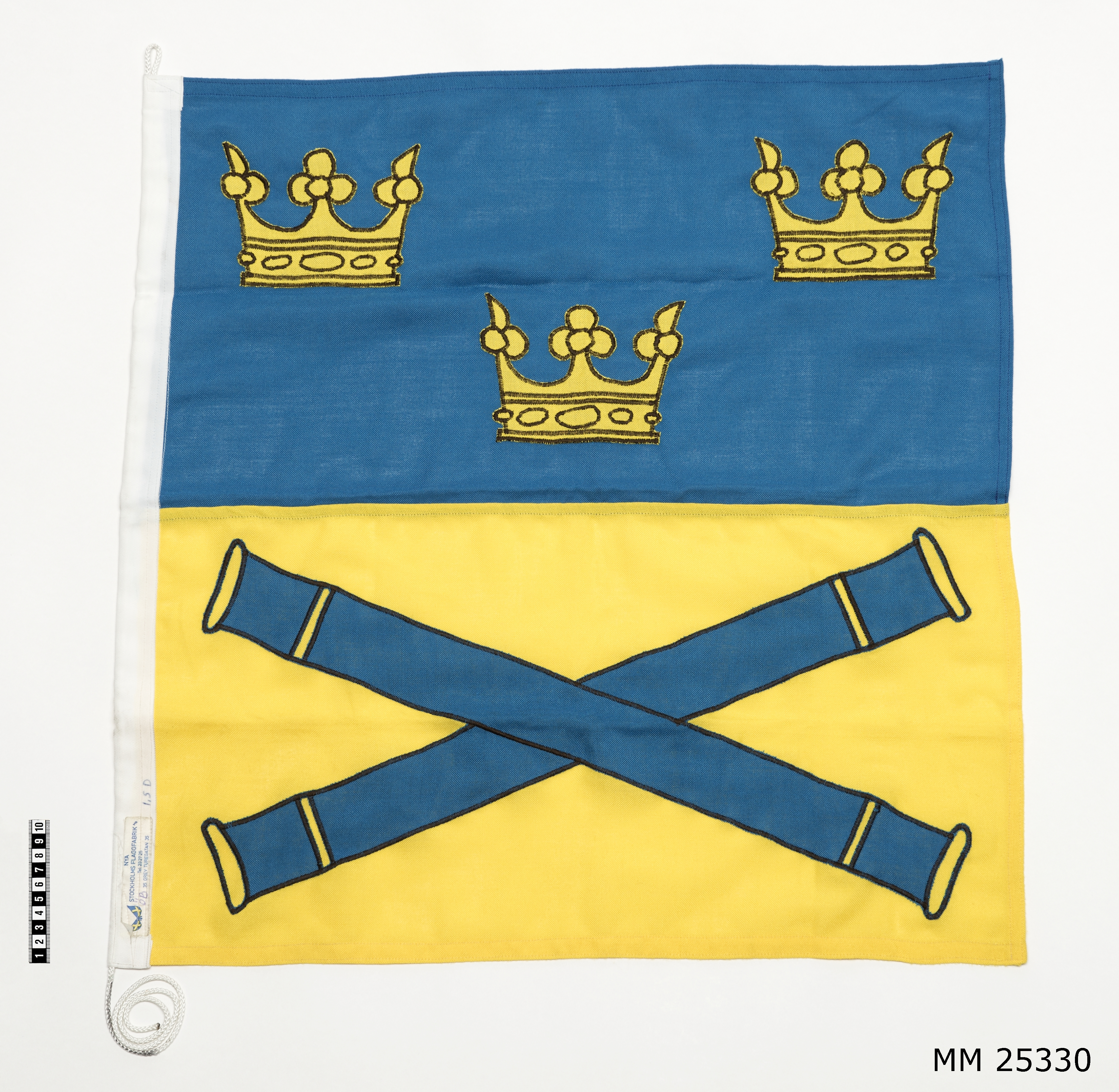
Command flag of the chief of defence.

Command sign of the chief of defence.

== List of supreme commanders/chiefs of defence ==
No.	Portrait	Name	Took office	Left office	Time in office	Defence branch	Prime Minister	Ref.
1	Olof Thörnell RoKKMO, KmstkSO, RVO	General; Olof Thörnell RoKKMO, KmstkSO, RVO (1877–1977)	8 December 1939	31 March 1944	4 years, 114 days	Army	Per Albin Hansson	
2	Helge Jung RoKKMO, KmstkSO, RVO1kl, RNO	General; Helge Jung RoKKMO, KmstkSO, RVO1kl, RNO (1886–1978)	1 April 1944	31 March 1951	6 years, 364 days	Army	Per Albin Hansson; Tage Erlander	
3	Nils Swedlund RoKKMO, KmstkSO, KNO2kl, RVO	General; Nils Swedlund RoKKMO, KmstkSO, KNO2kl, RVO (1898–1965)	1 April 1951 (Note: Appointed on 26 January 1951.)	30 September 1961	10 years, 182 days	Army	Tage Erlander	
4	Torsten Rapp RoKKMO, KmstkSO, RNO, RVO	General; Torsten Rapp RoKKMO, KmstkSO, RNO, RVO (1905–1993)	1 October 1961	30 September 1970	8 years, 364 days	Air Force	Tage Erlander; Olof Palme	
5	Stig Synnergren KmstkSO	General; Stig Synnergren KmstkSO (1915–2004)	1 October 1970	30 September 1978	7 years, 364 days	Army	Olof Palme; Thorbjörn Fälldin	
6	Lennart Ljung KSO1kl	General; Lennart Ljung KSO1kl (1921–1990)	1 October 1978	30 September 1986	7 years, 364 days	Army	Thorbjörn Fälldin; Ola Ullsten; Olof Palme; Ingvar Carlsson	
7	Bengt Gustafsson	General; Bengt Gustafsson (1933–2019)	1 October 1986	30 June 1994	7 years, 272 days	Army	Ingvar Carlsson; Carl Bildt	
8	Owe Wiktorin	General; Owe Wiktorin (born 1940)	1 July 1994	30 June 2000	5 years, 365 days	Air Force	Carl Bildt; Ingvar Carlsson; Göran Persson	
9	Johan Hederstedt	General; Johan Hederstedt (born 1943)	1 July 2000	31 December 2003	3 years, 184 days	Army	Göran Persson	
10	Håkan Syrén	General; Håkan Syrén (born 1952)	1 January 2004	24 March 2009	5 years, 82 days	Navy (Amphibious Corps)	Göran Persson; Fredrik Reinfeldt	
11	Sverker Göranson	General; Sverker Göranson (born 1954)	25 March 2009	30 September 2015	6 years, 189 days	Army	Fredrik Reinfeldt; Stefan Löfven	
12	Micael Bydén	General; Micael Bydén (born 1964)	1 October 2015	30 September 2024	8 years, 365 days	Air Force	Stefan Löfven; Magdalena Andersson; Ulf Kristersson	
13	Michael Claesson	General; Michael Claesson (born 1965)	1 October 2024	Incumbent	1 year, 341 days	Army	Ulf Kristersson	

=== Timeline ===
Every time a new Chief of Defence is to be appointed, there is some debate between the different services. Some feel that some kind of rotational system would be appropriate. In actuality, most Chiefs of Defence have come from the Army, and only one, Håkan Syrén, from the Navy. Because he is a general of the Amphibious Corps, there has to this day not been a single admiral to hold the office.

== List of deputy supreme commanders ==
Until 30 June 1994, the chief of the defence staff was the second most senior member of the Swedish Armed Forces. When the Swedish Armed Forces was reorganized on 1 July 1994, the chief of the defence staff position was abolished. Lieutenant General Percurt Green became the first deputy supreme commander who took office on 1 July 1994. He also held the post of head of the Joint Operations Command (Operationsledningen, OpL).

In conjunction with the Swedish Armed Forces Headquarters reorganization in 1998, a special position was created as deputy supreme commander to relieve the supreme commander. The deputy supreme commander led the Headquarters work through coordination of the operations. He also exercised employer responsibility for the staff in the Headquarters. In order to coordinate the operations he had a Coordination Department. The deputy supreme commander also acted as the deputy agency executive (Ställföreträdande myndighetschef). A formal position of head of the Swedish Armed Forces Headquarters was established in 2002.

From 1 October 2005, the post of deputy supreme commander became the director general of the Swedish Armed Forces held by a civil servant.

No.	Portrait	Name	Took office	Left office	Time in office	Defence branch	Prime Minister	Ref.
1	Percurt Green	Lieutenant General; Percurt Green (1939–2025)	1 July 1994	30 June 1998	3 years, 364 days	Army	Carl Bildt; Ingvar Carlsson; Göran Persson	
2	Frank Rosenius	Vice Admiral; Frank Rosenius (born 1940)	1 July 1998	2000	1–2 years	Navy	Göran Persson	
3	Hans Berndtson	Lieutenant General; Hans Berndtson (born 1945)	1 January 2001 (Note: Berndtson was appointed on 19 April 2000. He formally took office on 1 January 2001, but came from 1 July 2000 to help the then newly appointed Supreme Commander, General Johan Hederstedt.)	31 October 2004	3 years, 304 days	Army	Göran Persson	
-	Jan Salestrand	Lieutenant General; Jan Salestrand (born 1954)	31 January 2013	18 March 2013	46 days	Air Force	Fredrik Reinfeldt	

== See also ==
- Lord High Admiral of Sweden (historical antecedent)
- Lord High Constable of Sweden (historical antecedent)
