= Swedish Armed Forces Basic Training Medal =

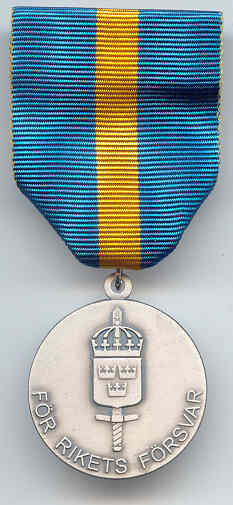
- Type: Military medal (Decoration)
- Awarded for: Conscripts who have completed military service
- Country: Sweden
- Presented by: Sweden
- Eligibility: Swedish personnel
- Motto: "FOR DEFENCE OF THE REALM"
- Status: Dormant from 30 June 2010 to 2016
- Established: 16 August 2002
- Ribbon

Swedish Armed Forces Basic Training Medal (Swedish: Försvarsmaktens grundutbildningsmedalj, FMGUSM), previously the Swedish Armed Forces Conscript Medal (Swedish: Försvarsmaktens värnpliktsmedalj, FMvplSM (Note: Sometimes incorrectly termed FMvplM)) is a Swedish reward medal instituted by the Swedish Armed Forces and was awarded to conscripts.

== History ==
The medal was instituted on 16 August 2002 by the Supreme Commander's letter 16991:74739. When drafting for conscription ended in 2010, the medal became dormant on 30 June. When conscription service was renewed in 2016, the medal was reinstated under a new name, and also allowed for those who ended conscription in 2011.

== Appearance ==
The medal is made by silvered bronze with 31 mm diameter. The obverse shows the Swedish Armed Forces heraldic arms and around the outer edge the text För rikets försvar ("For defence of the realm"). The reverse is blank with a laurel wreath around the outer edge and can be by the unit be fitted with the current name or personal identity number and or year in engraving. The medal is also made in miniature. The ribbon is blue moiré with a broad yellow stripe on the middle.

The miniature medal measures 16 mm. A copy of the medal (in a gift case with the miniature medal and service ribbon) has been added to the collections of the Royal Coin Cabinet, by the Swedish Armed Forces. Conscripts are only awarded the medal, but the miniature medal can be purchased separately.

== Presenting ==
The medal and a diploma is awarded to conscripts as a reward for completing conscript training with military service rating of at least 10-5-5 at discharge from active service. If the basic training is discontinued because of injury or disease received in the service, the medal is awarded if the conscript is deemed to achieve a passing grade on completion of service. The medal can be awarded only once. The medal can be awarded posthumously. The medal can also be ordered by anyone who has completed his military service before 26 August 2002. Approved grade shall be authenticated in connection with the order. In 2003 approximately 14,000 conscripts received the medal.

The medal is awarded by the commanding officer (or equivalent) at the appropriate ceremony in connection with discharge. Staff who fulfills the requirements for the award of the medal but for some reason, can not attend the above are awarded in the manner decided by the commanding officer (or equivalent).

== Wearing ==
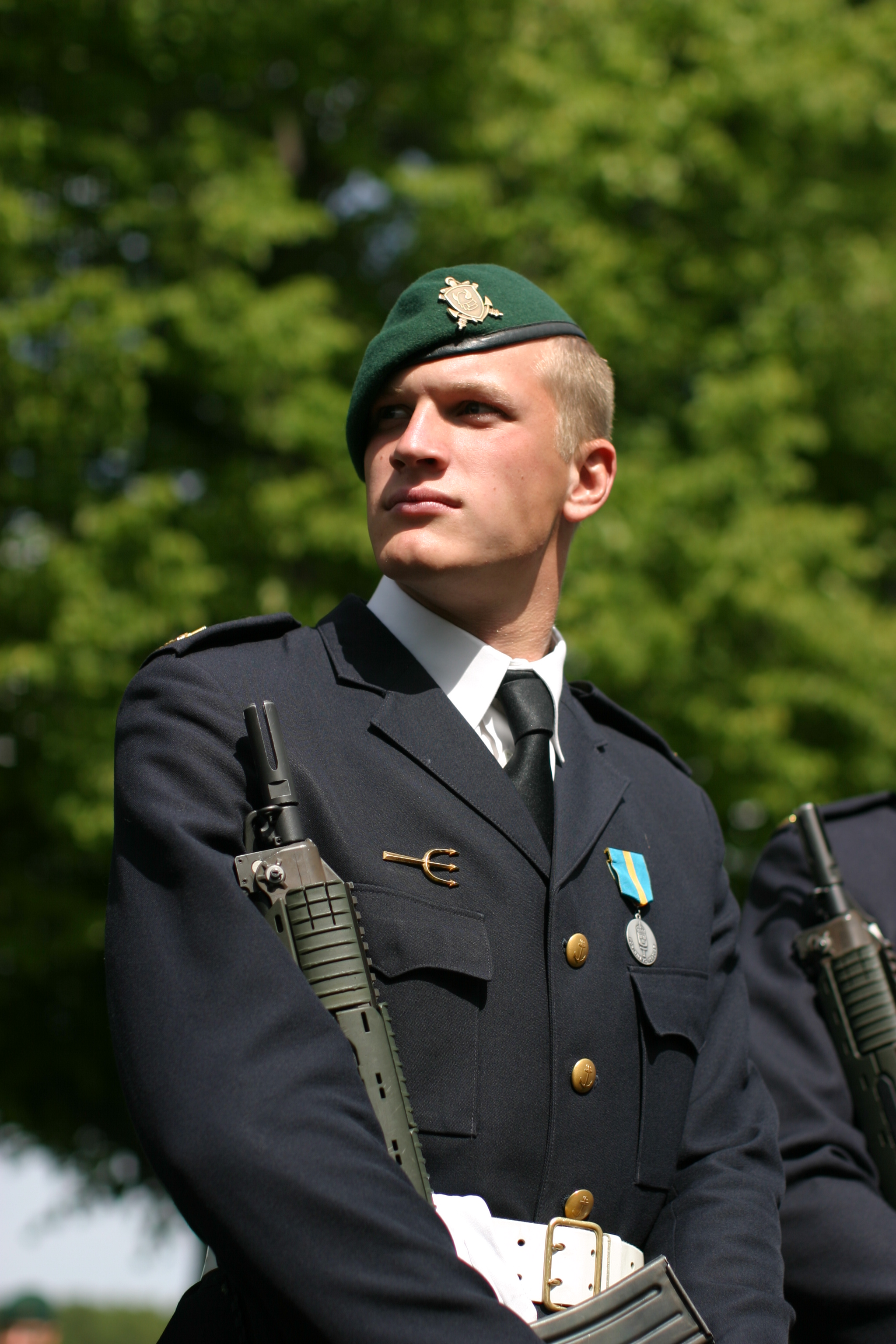
The medal on a coastal ranger.

The medal may be worn on the uniform according to the Supreme Commander's regulations on decorations to uniforms (FFS 1990:37). The award may be worn on the left side of the chest immediately after the royal and government medals. Instead of a medal, a service ribbon may be worn.
