= For Zealous and Devoted Service of the Realm =

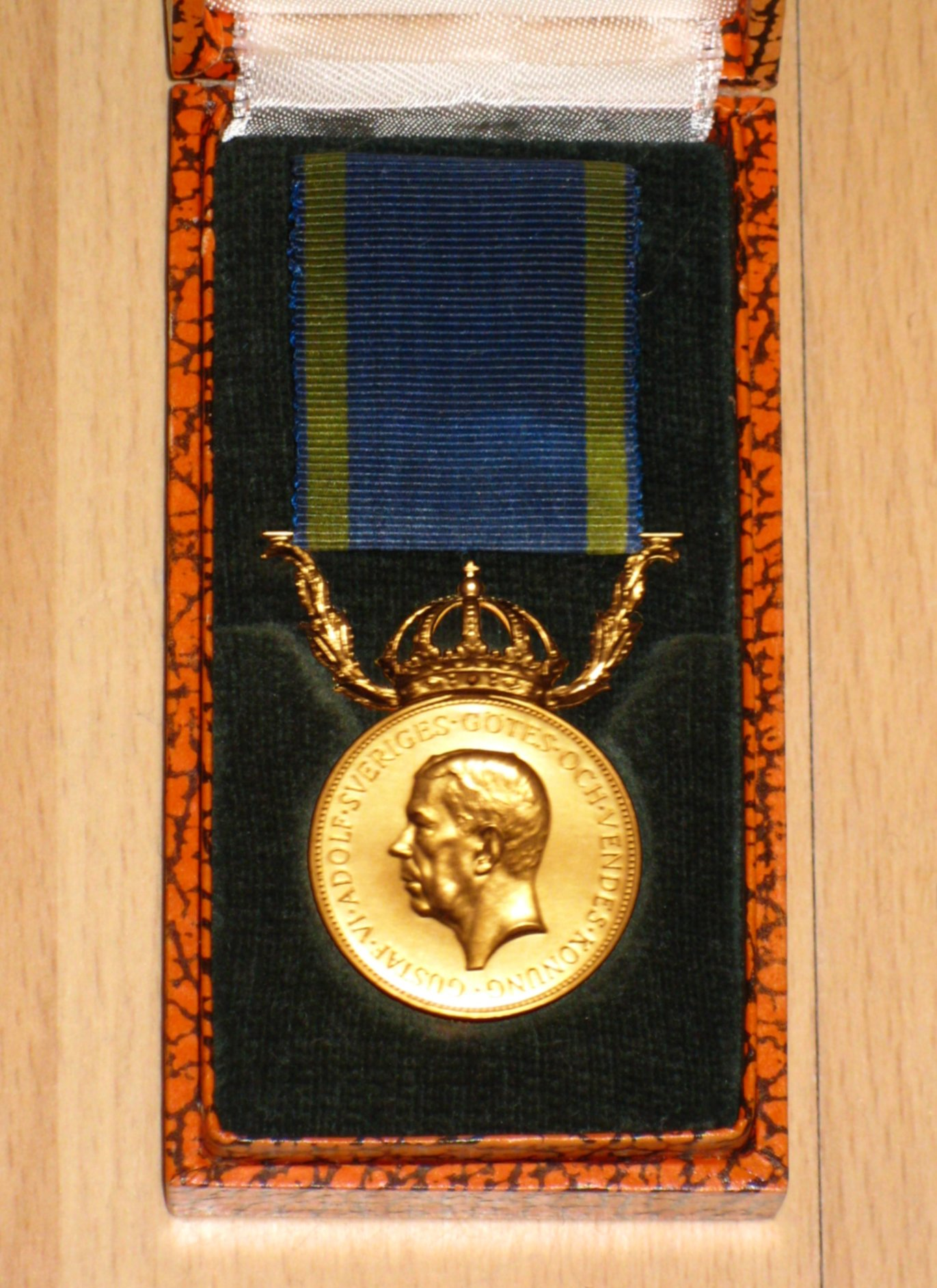
- The medal with King Gustaf VI Adolf's portrait.
- Type: Medal
- Awarded for: "Zealous and Devoted Service of the Realm"
- Country: Sweden
- Presented by: the Swedish Agency for Government Employers
- Eligibility: Individuals in service of the Swedish State for 30 years
- Status: Currently awarded
- First award: 1830
- Ribbon of the medal

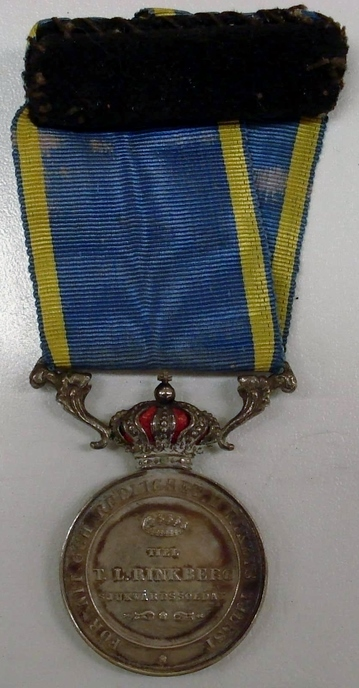
Pre-1947 medal in silver.

For Zealous and Devoted Service of the Realm (Swedish: För nit och redlighet i rikets tjänst) is a reward medal awarded to one who has been a Swedish State employee for 30 years and has shown "zealous and devoted service". As an alternative to the medal one can choose a wristwatch or a crystal bowl/art glass. Originally awarded by the King in Council, it is since 1976 awarded by the Swedish Agency for Government Employers.

== History ==
A medal with the inscription "Honorary reward for Zealous and Devoted Service of the Realm" (Hedersbelöning för nit och redlighet i rikets tienst) was proposed in 1803 by the Generaltullarrendesocieteten as a reward for customs officials. It was approved by the King in Council on 20 May the same year, but the first known awarding took place in 1830. Then as a silver medal of the 8th size.

On 1 July 1947 it was decided that the medal would only be awarded in gold of the 6th size. Previously it had been in four different sizes, three of gold and one of silver. By the 1973 order reform, the Riksdag decided that the medal would be the only award to be awarded for state service.

== Appearance ==
The medal is made of 23 karat gold, weighs 11 grams and has a diameter of 27.5 millimeters ("6th size" according to the Berch's Scale). It is crowned by a royal crown and carries the image of the ruling monarch. The medal is worn on the left side of the chest in a 28 millimeter broad, blue ribbon with yellow edges. The band is straight for men, and bow knot for ladies. The medal is in its present appearance on the obverse provided with King Carl XVI Gustaf's portrait in profile made by Ernst Nordin. The reverse has the text "For Zealous and Devoted Service of the Realm", along with the name of the recipient and an oak leaf wreath.

Anyone who does not want a gold medal reward can choose from the following options:

- Crystal bowl from Kosta Boda glassworks, shaped, blown and engraved by hand. The decor is created by artist Lisa Bauer and the pattern reflects a Småland twinflower. The bowl is 190 mm high and about 205 to 150 mm in range.
- Crystal bowl from Orrefors Glassworks, labeled with the coat of arms of Sweden and is signed in the bottom "Orrefors Gunnar Cyrén". The bowl is 135 mm high and has a diameter of 235 mm.
- Art sculpture by Ernst Billgren is one with nature and together with Kosta Boda's glass blowers he has created this vase exclusively for the award. The vase is 265 mm high, 130 mm in diameter and weighs 2.1 kg.
- Art sculpture by Bertil Vallien in the form of a half-boat is made exclusively for the award. The sculpture is 310 mm high, 95 mm long, 90 mm deep and weighs 2.5 kg.
- Wristwatch, earlier from Tissot or Certina, now Epoch Stockholm. The watches are available for both ladies and gentlemen. The watches were made of 18 carat gold, now 14 carat, and have sapphire glass. From 2024, the women's and men's watches must have the same gold weight for egalitarian reasons. None of the traditional manufacturers could provide that, so a long tradition was broken. Since the gold value of the men's watches became much less than before, the watches have to be manufactured in 14 carat gold instead. The band is made of calfskin.

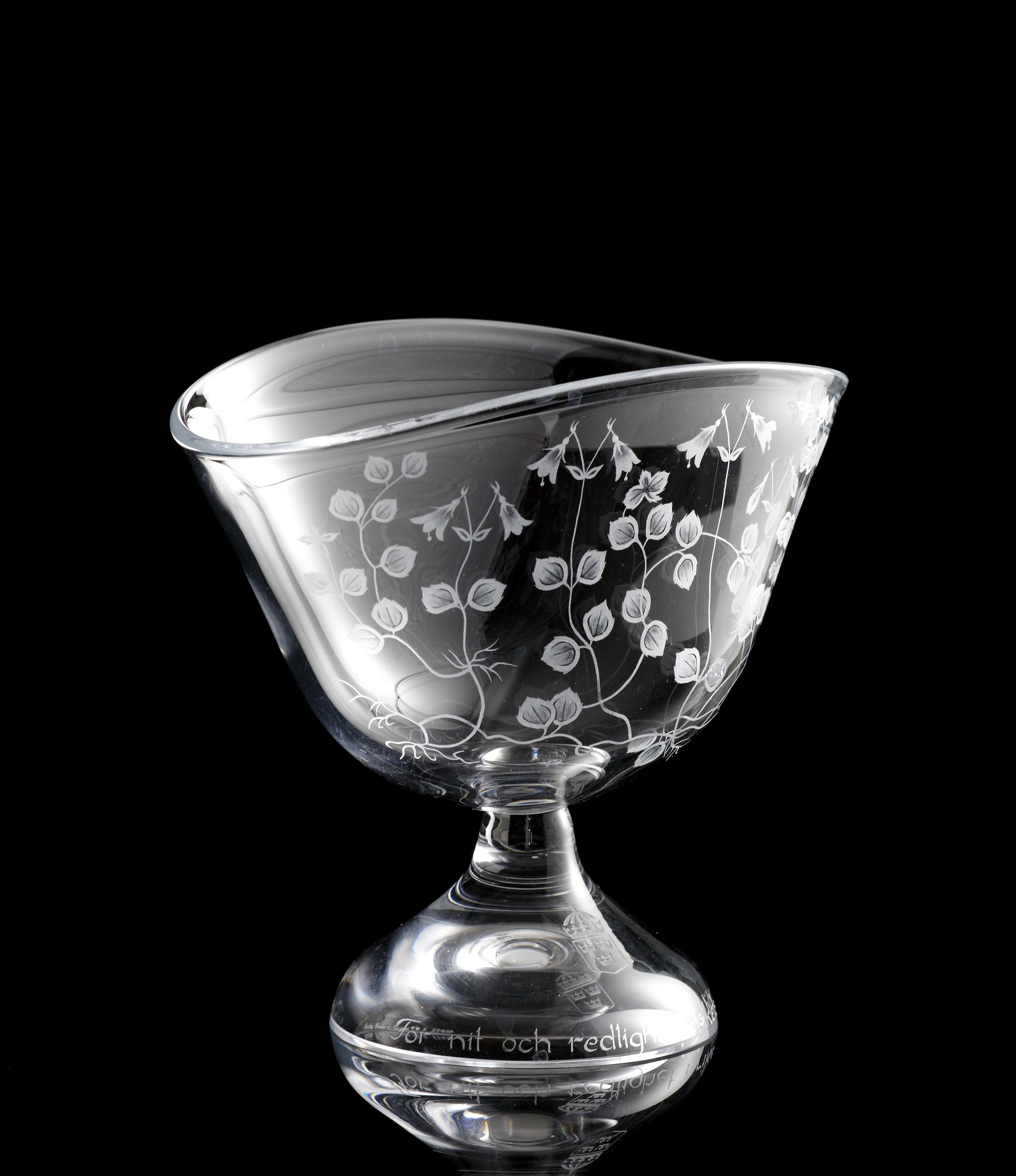
Statstjänstemannaskålen, crystal bowl designed by Lisa Bauer
