= Herlitz (surname) =

Herlitz is a German-Slavic language surname. It may refer to:

- Annika Herlitz (1984), Swedish singer, musical performer, and voice actress
- Carl Herlitz (1867–1939), German bookseller and the founder of the family business Herlitz
- Carl-Gustaf Herlitz (1882–1961), Finnish business executive
- Esther Herlitz (1921–2016), Israeli diplomat and politician
- Fredrik Herlitz (born 1973), Swedish Amphibious Corps officer
- Günter Herlitz (1913–2010), German business man
- Hermann Herlitz (1834–1920), pastor of the Lutheran Trinity Church in East Melbourne, Australia
- Klaus and Eva Herlitz (died 2021), German married couple and businesspeople
- Lena Persson Herlitz (1967), Swedish Amphibious Corps officer
- Nils Herlitz (1888–1978), Swedish historian, legal scholar and politician
