= Johan Pekkari =

Swedish army general (born 1971)

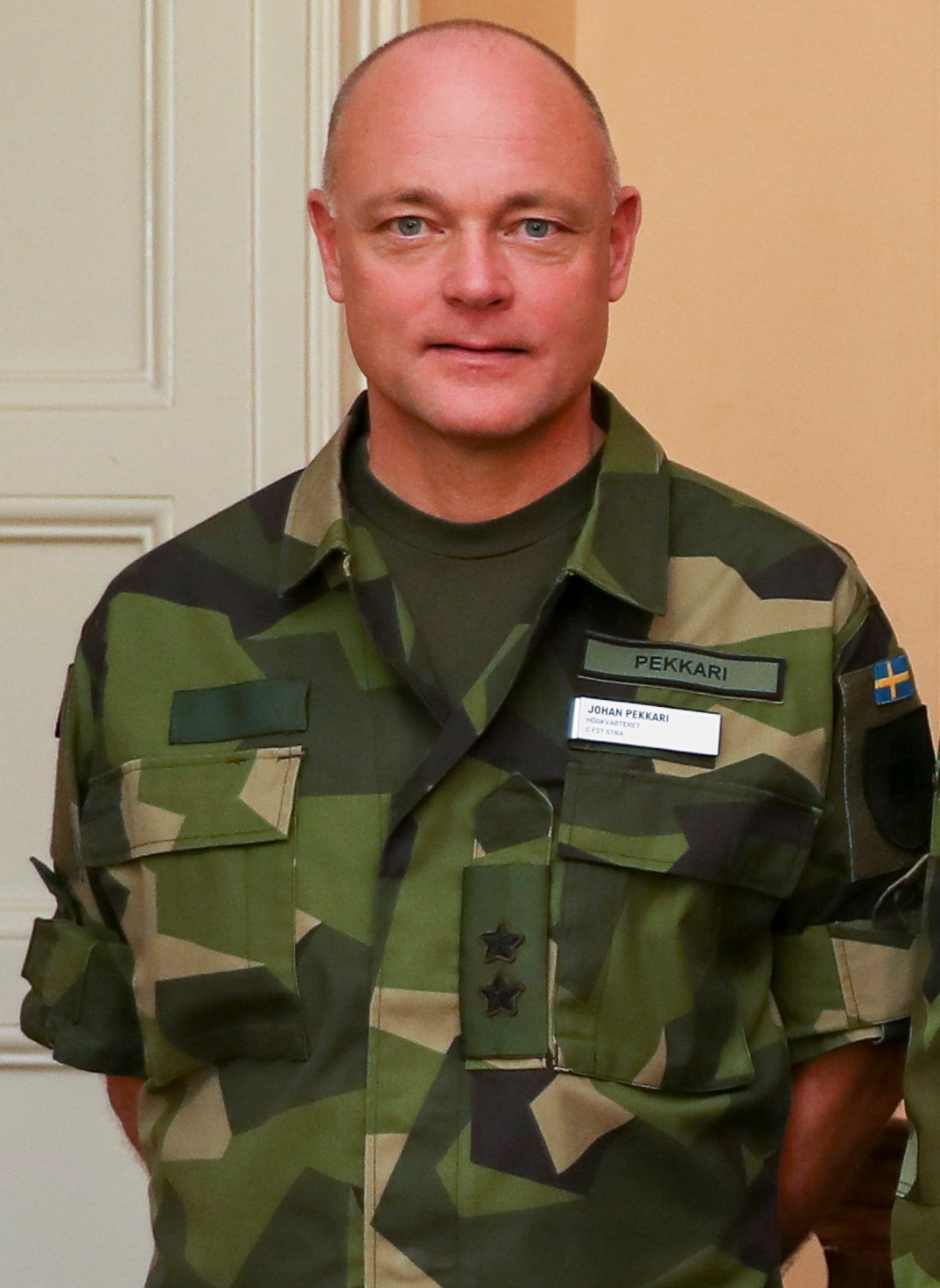
- Pekkari in October 2023
- Born: 1971 (age 54–55); Karlskoga, Sweden
- Military career
- Allegiance: Sweden
- Branch: Swedish Army
- Service years: 1993–present
- Rank: Major general
- Commands: 92nd Artillery Battalion; Artillery Regiment; Deputy Chief of Policy and Plans Department; Chief of Directorate of Strategic Plans and Policy; Chief of Army
- Conflicts: Post-Kosovo War

Major General Johan Pekkari (born 1971) is a Swedish Army officer. He began his career in artillery and later commanded the 92nd Artillery Battalion and the Artillery Regiment. He has also held several senior positions at Swedish Armed Forces Headquarters, focusing on planning, procurement, and defence policy. He served with KFOR in Kosovo and attended the Royal College of Defence Studies in London. In 2023, he became Chief of Strategic Plans and Policy and was promoted to major general. In August 2026, he assumed command as Chief of Army.

== Early life ==
Pekkari was born in 1971 in Karlskoga, Sweden. His father is from Tärendö.

== Career ==
Pekkari began his career as a professional officer at the Bergslagen Artillery Regiment (A 9) in Kristinehamn after completing military service as a forward observer in 1992–1993. In addition to his military officer's degree, Pekkari holds a degree in economics from Örebro University.

From 2007 to 2009, Pekkari attended the Command and Staff Programme at the Swedish National Defence College, with a specialization in military technology. His thesis, C-RAM – An American Acronym or a Swedish Capability?, examined counter-rocket, artillery and mortar capabilities. In 2010, Pekkari served with the Kosovo Force (KFOR) as Policy and Plans General Coordinator.

From 2011 to 2012, he was commander of the 92nd Artillery Battalion in Boden. He subsequently served at the Swedish Armed Forces Headquarters in Stockholm, including as a materiel coordinator for indirect fire within the Training and Procurement Staff. On 1 September 2014, Pekkari assumed command of the Artillery Regiment (A 9) and was promoted to colonel. He formally assumed command during a ceremony at the regiment's barracks on 18 September 2014.

From 1 November 2016, Pekkari served as head of the Follow-up and Analysis Section of the Plans and Finance Department within the Defence Staff (Note: LEDS PLAN EK U/A refers to the Defence Staff (Ledningsstaben, LEDS), Plans and Finance Department (Planerings- och ekonomiavdelningen, PLANEK), Follow-up and Analysis Section (Sektionen för uppföljning och analys, U/A).) at Swedish Armed Forces Headquarters. From 1 September 2019, he was placed at the disposal of the Training and Procurement Staff. From 9 March 2018 to 19 July 2019, Pekkari attended the Royal College of Defence Studies in London, United Kingdom.

From 10 September 2020 to 31 December 2022, Pekkari served as Deputy Chief of Policy and Plans Department. On 1 January 2023, Pekkari assumed the position of Chief of Directorate of Strategic Plans (Note: Chefen för Försvarsstabens strategienhet (C FST STRA) has been translated in various sources as Chief of Directorate of Strategic Plans and Policy, Defence Staff.) and Policy within the Defence Staff (Chefen för Försvarsstabens strategienhet, C FST STRA). He was promoted to major general upon taking up the position. His appointment was extended from 1 January 2026.

On 18 August 2026, Chief of Defence General Michael Claesson appointed Pekkari as Chief of Army. He assumed command of the Swedish Army on 28 August 2026, succeeding Acting Chief of Army Brigadier General Per Nilsson at a ceremony at the Cavalry Barracks in Stockholm.

== Personal life ==
Pekkari is married to Ylva, who is also an officer.

== Dates of rank ==
- 1993 – Second lieutenant
- ???? – Lieutenant
- ???? – Captain
- ???? – Major
- ???? – Lieutenant colonel
- 1 September 2014 – Colonel
- 2020 – Brigadier general
- 1 January 2023 – Major general

== Awards and decorations ==
=== Swedish ===
- (Sweden) Swedish Armed Forces Conscript Medal
- (Sweden) Swedish Armed Forces International Service Medal
- (Sweden) Värmland Regiment and Värmland Brigade Commemorative Medal (Värmlands regementes och Värmlandsbrigadens minnesmedalj, VärmlregbrigMSM)
- (Sweden) Artillery Regiment (A 9) Medal of Medal (Artilleriregementets förtjänstmedalj)

=== Foreign ===
- NATO Non-Article 5 medal for the Balkans

== Honours ==
- Member of the Royal Swedish Academy of War Sciences (2020)

== Footnotes ==
Military offices
Preceded by Lena Persson Herlitz	Deputy Chief of Policy and Plans Department; 2020–2022	Succeeded by None
Preceded by None	Chief of Directorate of Strategic Plans and Policy; 2023–2026	Succeeded by Andreas Odung
Preceded by Jonny Lindfors	Chief of Army; 2026–present	Succeeded by Incumbent
