= Herlitz =

German manufacturing company

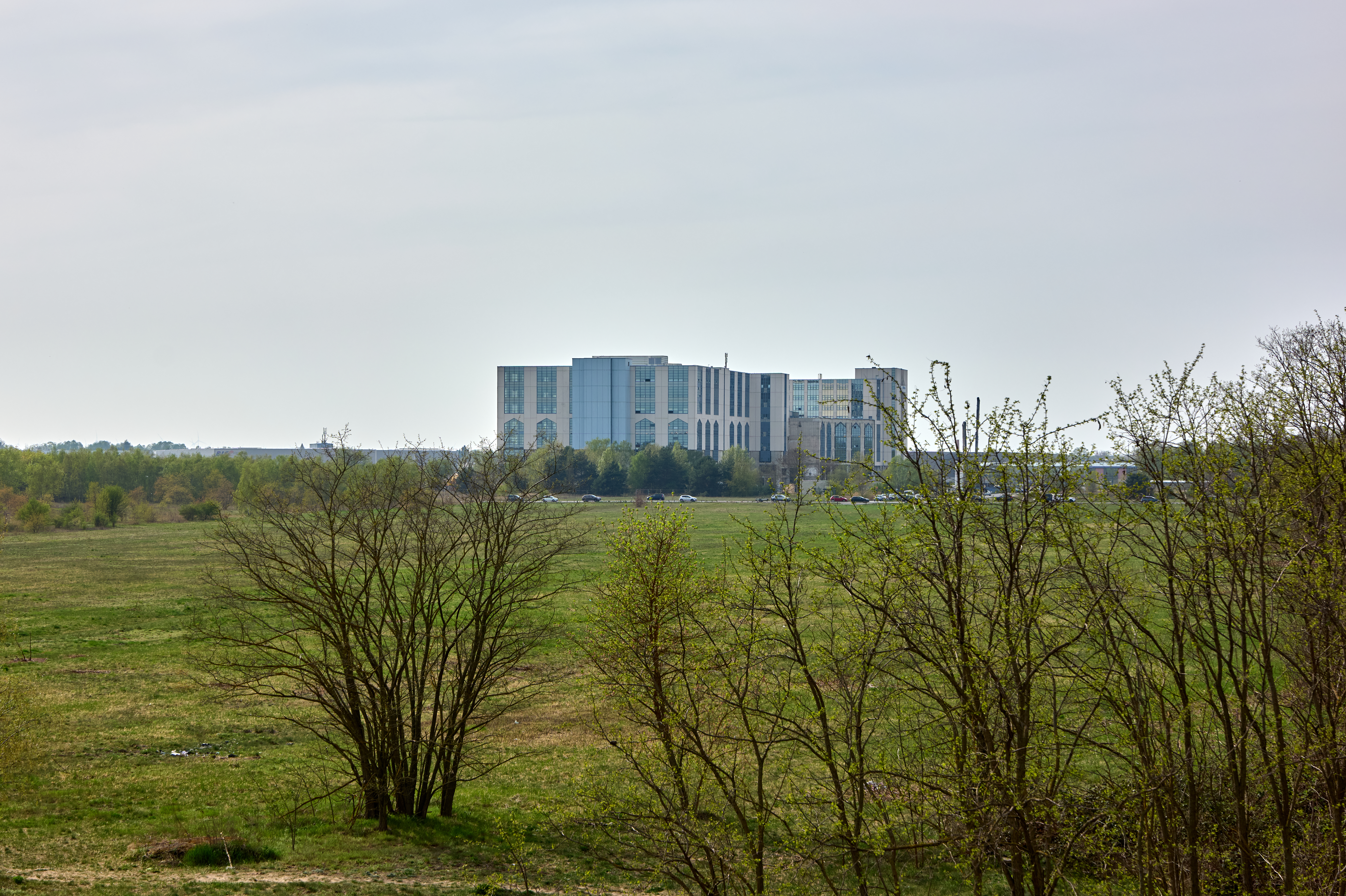
- Herlitz building in Falkensee, 2025
- Company type: Aktiengesellschaft; Brand (2005–present)
- Industry: Stationery
- Founded: 1904; 122 years ago in Berlin
- Founder: Carl Herlitz and Günter Herlitz
- Defunct: 2005
- Fate: Acquired by Stationery Products S.à.r.l. in 2005, then sold to Pelikan in 2009
- Headquarters: Hanover, Germany
- Key people: Loo Hooi Keat (President)
- Products: Writing implements, office supplies
- Revenue: € 197.1 million (2012)
- Owner: Pelikan Holdings AG (2009–); Stationery Products S.à.r.l. (2005–09)
- Number of employees: 1,335 (FTE, 2012)
- Subsidiaries: Susy Card
- Website: herlitz.de

Herlitz PBS AG is a former German manufacturing company originally based in Berlin. It produced a wide range of products for office and school uses. The company expanded to about 3,000 customers throughout Europe, with 1,335 employees as of 2012.

After several financial problems, Herlitz was taken over by Luxembourg company Stationery Products S.à.r.l. in 2005, then becoming part of Pelikan, which now owns the Herlitz brand.

== History ==
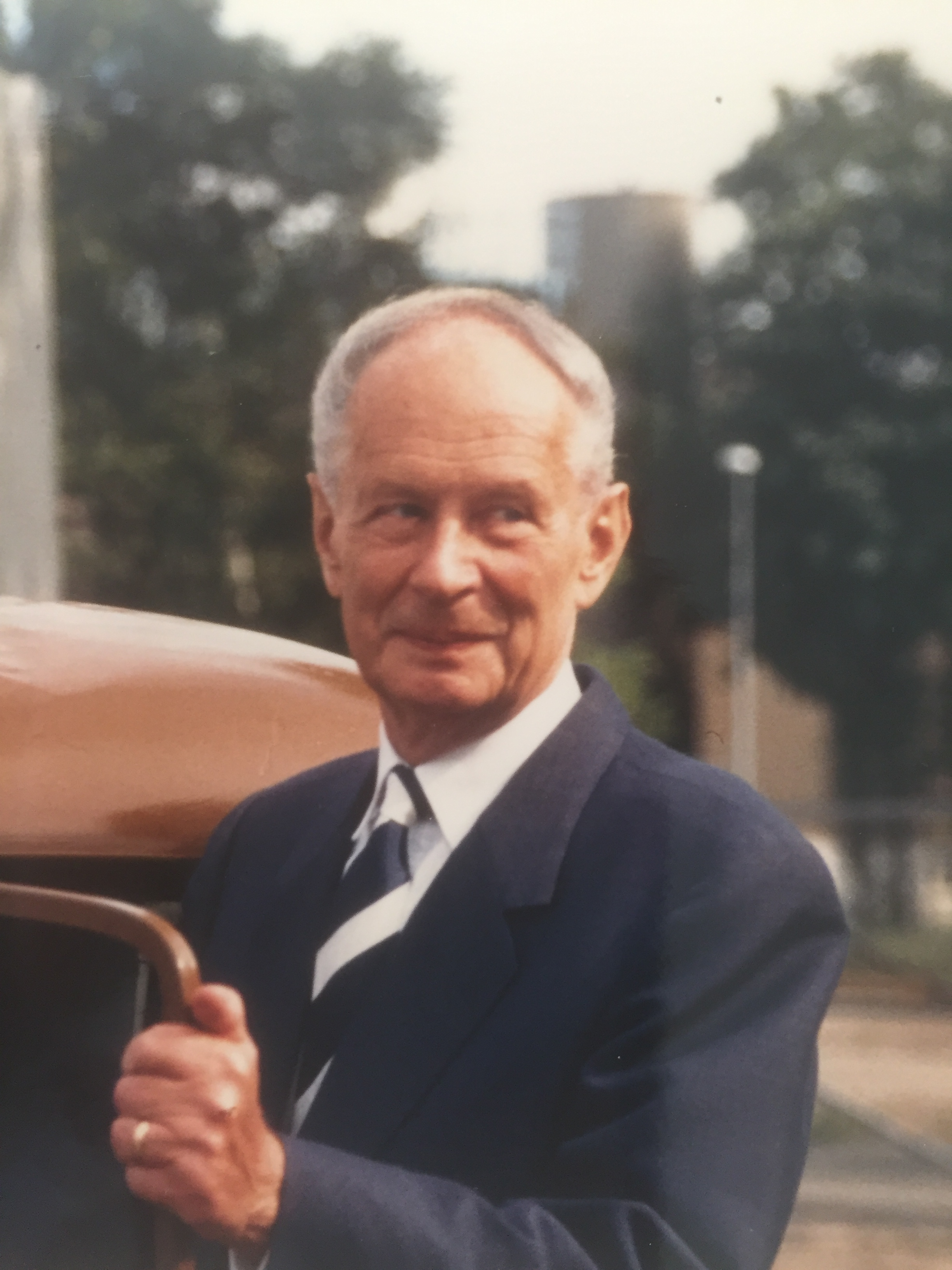
Gunther Herlitz, co-founder

The company was founded in Berlin by bookseller Carl Herlitz in September 1904 as a stationery wholesaler. He ran the small firm for 31 years before stepping down in 1935 for health reasons. Herlitz expanded its distribution after the company was taken over by the son, Günter Herlitz. The company had six employees at that time.

After Günter Herlitz was conscripted for military service, his mother Berta Herlitz temporarily took over managing the company and maintained customer relations. In November 1943, the business premises in Berlin were completely destroyed two times by the effects of the war; business activity ground to a halt.

Günter Herlitz resumed business operations as early as the summer of 1945 (in a basement, at first), initially dealing in bargains of all kinds. At that time, it was still possible to supply customers in East Germany. During the Berlin Blockade (1948–49), the company Herlitz was the only one of around 20 Berlin wholesalers to succeed in securing a minimal amount of goods shipped by air from West Germany to Berlin. The product range was expanded considerably once the blockade had ended.

Turnover doubled every four years from 1949 to 1994. In 1960, Herlitz established its own distribution organisation for West Germany. The breakthrough on the German market was made with illustrated notebooks and exercise books (animal motifs and athletic imagery). Rapid development followed. Up to 150 tonnes of paper were processed each month.

The expansion in the 1970s was reflected in the company's change in legal form as well as its international activity. Herlitz was transformed into a joint-stock company in 1972. Its first high bay warehouse, with 6,000 pallet slots for finished goods, went into operation in 1974. It employed a staff of 504 on the annual average.

1974 marked the establishment of "Herlitz Consult GmbH", which was commissioned in 1975 to construct a turnkey factory for exercise books in Baghdad. Together with a bridge as well as a small mosque, which were also built, this was the largest single contract in the history of Herlitz (order volume: 38 million Deutsche mark).

Herlitz went public in 1977, while "Herlitz International Trading (HIT) AG", which emerged from Herlitz Consult, made its initial public offering at the end of the 1980s.

The company continued to expand heavily in the 1980s as well. In 1985, for instance, it acquired a shipping centre in Berlin-Spandau, which, according to the 1986 Guinness Book of Records, had the largest high bay warehouse in the world with over 70,000 pallet slots. The first McPaper stores were opened in the mid-1980s. The greeting card company "Susy Card" was acquired in 1987.

Several foreign distribution companies were established in Europe, as well as in Texas USA (1981–1990). In 1991, construction started on a new shipping centre in Falkensee (near Berlin), which went into operation in 1994.

After decade-long company president and chairman of the board Günter Herlitz (who became chairman of the supervisory board) bade farewell, a dispute in the third generation broke out in 1988 between brothers Peter and Heinz. It ended in 1992, when Heinz Herlitz resigned. But Herlitz's turnover continued to climb, reaching a record result of €885 m in 1994.

In 1994, "HIT AG" bought the Russian paper factory "Wolga AG", where exorbitant profits were made. In 1995, under new executive board chairman Gérald Jaslowitzer, the entrepreneurially led family company gradually transformed into a management-run holding, which Herlitz PBS AG, "Herlitz Falkenhöh AG", HIT AG and McPaper AG belonged to. In March 1995, Jaslowitzer gave a weighty interview to German business magazine Manager magazine which signalled the end of HIT AG, once Herlitz's most successful subsidiary. As a result, McPaper AG had to be sold to Deutsche Post AG in 1998.

Heavy losses from 1998 to 2000 forced Herlitz to make drastic cuts at the beginning of the 21st century. Herlitz AG, Herlitz PBS AG and Susy Card filed for insolvency in April 2002. The plan for insolvency proceedings was already concluded in September 2002. Herlitz succeeded in making it through insolvency proceedings in accordance with the new insolvency law in record time while keeping operations running. But turnover only amounted to €335 m in 2004, the year of the company's anniversary.

Effective as of 4 October 2005, "Stationery Products S.à.r.l." (a society with limited responsibility company headquartered in Luxembourg) acquired 64,7% of Herlitz AG's capital stock. Stationery Products indirectly belonged to Advent International Corporation, an internationally active private equity company headquartered in Boston, United States. The Herlitz family held approx. 15% of the shares, the rest was in scattered holdings.

By 2008, Herlitz's production facilities were located in the town of Falkensee, Brandenburg, with other plants in Poland, Romania and Great Britain. Herlitz's logistics supplied approx. 8,000 distribution centres in Germany directly, with another 3,000 customers throughout Europe. The company had 1,335 employees, 1,100 of which were in Germany. By 2011, The share of exports amounted to 42%. Herlitz carried a product line of around 15,000 office supplies and stationery items. In November 2009, Stationery Products sold all of the shares to Pelikan Holding AG.

In March 2014, Pelikan took over distribution and sales activities of Herlitz for Germany and Austria.

== Products ==
Current products commercialised with the Herlitz name are:

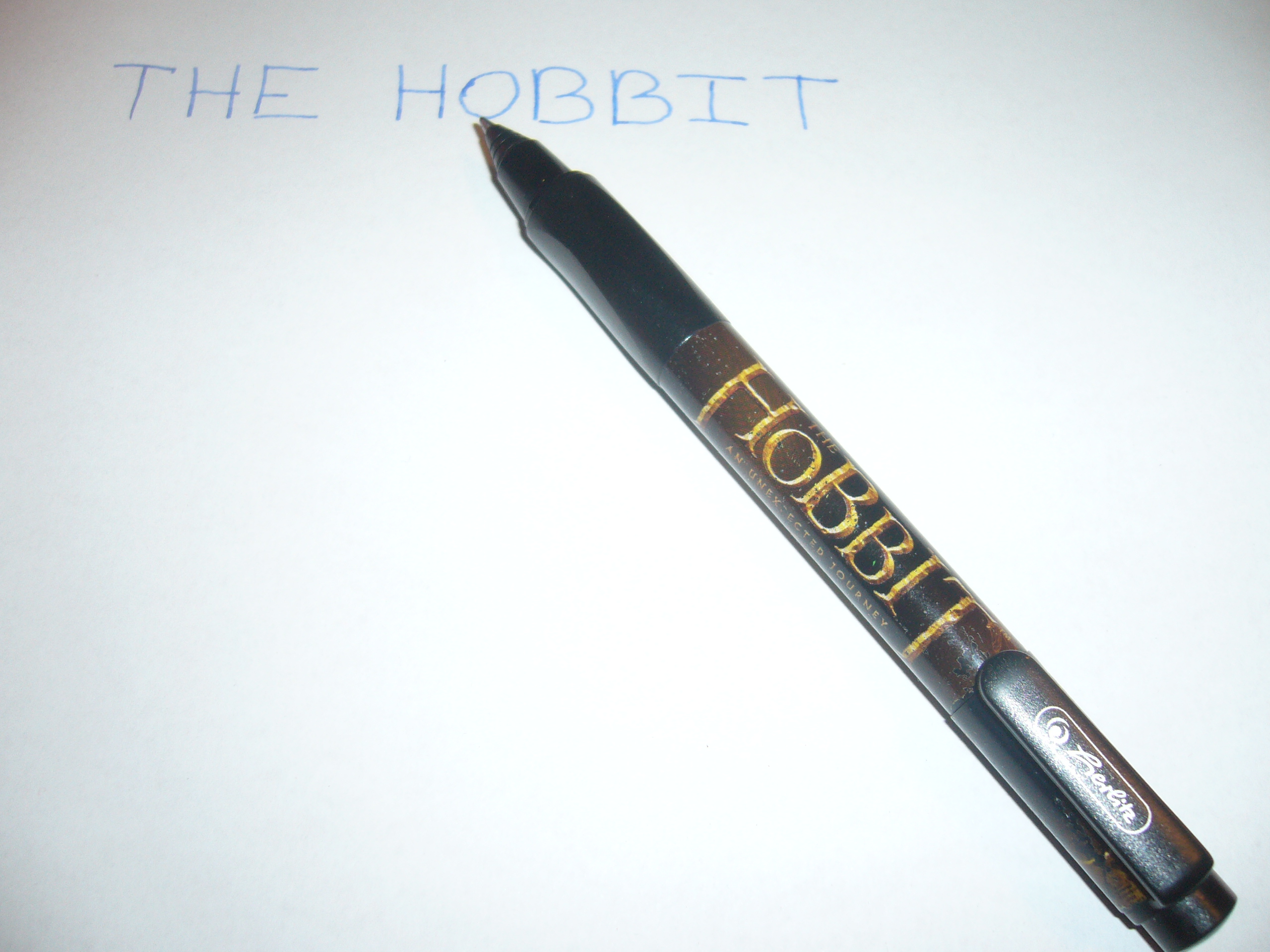
A rechargeable pen of The Hobbit: An Unexpected Journey by Herlitz

Type	Products
Writing implements	Ballpoint pens, pencils, mechanical pencils, markers
Accessories	Pencil sharpeners, pencil erasers, ink erasers, ink cartridges
Art products	Watercolor, tempera, colored pencils, brushes, pallets, crayons, modelling clay, chalk
Papers	Kraft paper, drawing pads, coloring books, agendas, envelopes, lottery tickets
Tools	Scissors, cutters
Organization	Stickers, labels
