= Scanian Dragoon Regiment =

Scanian Dragoon Regiment may refer to:

- Scanian Dragoon Regiment (cavalry), Swedish Army cavalry regiment (1676–1928)
- Scanian Dragoon Regiment (armoured), Swedish Army armoured regiment (1963–1994)
