= Pelikan =

German manufacturing company

Pelikan Holding AG
- Type: Aktiengesellschaft
- Industry: Stationery
- Founded: 28 April 1838 (188 years ago) in Hanover, Kingdom of Hanover
- Founder: Carl Hornemann
- Headquarters: Hanover, Lower Saxony, Germany
- Key people: Loo Hooi Keat (President); Ho Ming Hon (Vice-President)
- Products: Writing implements; art materials; office goods
- Brands: Herlitz; Geha; Susy Card
- Revenue: 206,151,905.55 EUR (2015)
- Total equity: 76,212 (2017)
- Number of employees: 1,854 (2015)
- Subsidiaries: Multiple (worldwide)
- Website: pelikan.com

Pelikan Holding AG (German pronunciation: [ˈpeːlikaːn] or [peliˈkaːn]) is a German manufacturing company of writing, office and art equipment. Credited with the invention of the differential-piston filling method, the original company was founded in Hanover in 1838 before it went bankrupt and restarted. Through a reverse takeover on 8 April 2005, Pelikan Holding AG is now an Aktiengesellschaft company (limited by shared ownership), part of the Pelikan Group GmbH.

Pelikan manufactures a wide range of products including writing implements, art materials and office goods.

Pelikan art collection and pens at Makoba pen store, Bengaluru (2026)

== History ==
The roots of the company can be traced to 1838, when chemist Carl Hornemann founded a paint and ink factory in Hanover, then the capital of the Kingdom of Hanover. The date of the first price list of the company, 28 April, is set as the company's foundation date.

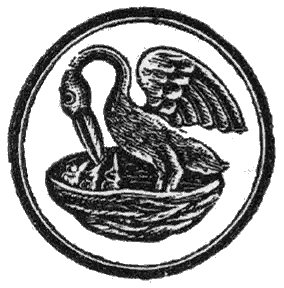
The first Pelikan logo, designed in 1878

In 1863, Guenther Wagner obtained the position of chemist and plant manager. He took over the company in 1871. Wagner also designed the company's first logo (taking the figure of a pelican from his own familial coat of arms) in 1878, and so becoming one of the first German trademarks ever. The company expanded its range of distribution to present-day Austria, Italy, Czech Republic, Hungary and Croatia, then established a new factory in Vienna.

By 1881 the company had expanded its plant, employing 39 additional people. When Fritz Beindorff took over the company, Pelikan added office products for copying, stamping, sticking and erasing. In 1896, Pelikan started to produce India ink, achieving great sales success. By 1913, the manufacturing were expanded, and 1057 workers were employed by Pelikan. In 1929, Pelikan produced its first fountain pen. Pelikan expanded its products to watercolor sets in 1931. The production of writing instruments was moved to Peine, as the Hanover facilities could no longer be expanded.

Fritz Beindorff, owner of Pelikan at the time, was one of the sixteen initial signatories of the 1932 Industrielleneingabe, urging President Paul von Hindenburg to appoint Adolf Hitler as chancellor. During the war, both pen and ink production suffered, and the company produced paints, coatings, and other chemicals with military use. From 1942 on, the company operated Gestapo labor education camps at their Hanover works, where forced labourers were employed.

In 1978, Pelikan became a stock corporation, changing its legal form from a GmbH to an AG, with shares being divided within the Beindorff family and 46 other owners. Six years later, Pelikan was taken over by a Swiss company. The Hanover-based company was separated into various sub-companies and then sold.

In 1996, Goodace SDN BHD, a Malaysian company, took over the majority of Pelikan holding shares. Pelikan moved to a new office building in Hanover in 2003. Two years later, Geha-Werke company merged with Pelikan, although operating as an independent division.

In November 2009 Pelikan purchased rival stationery company Herlitz, which had been previously bought by "Stationery Products S.à.r.l.", a Luxembourg-based company. By the time of the acquisition, Herlitz's production facilities were located in the town of Falkensee, Brandenburg, with other plants in Poland, Romania and Great Britain. Herlitz's logistics supplied approx. 8,000 distribution centres in Germany directly, with another 3,000 customers throughout Europe. The company had 1,335 employees, 1,100 of which were in Germany.

== Products ==
Current products manufactured by Pelikan are:

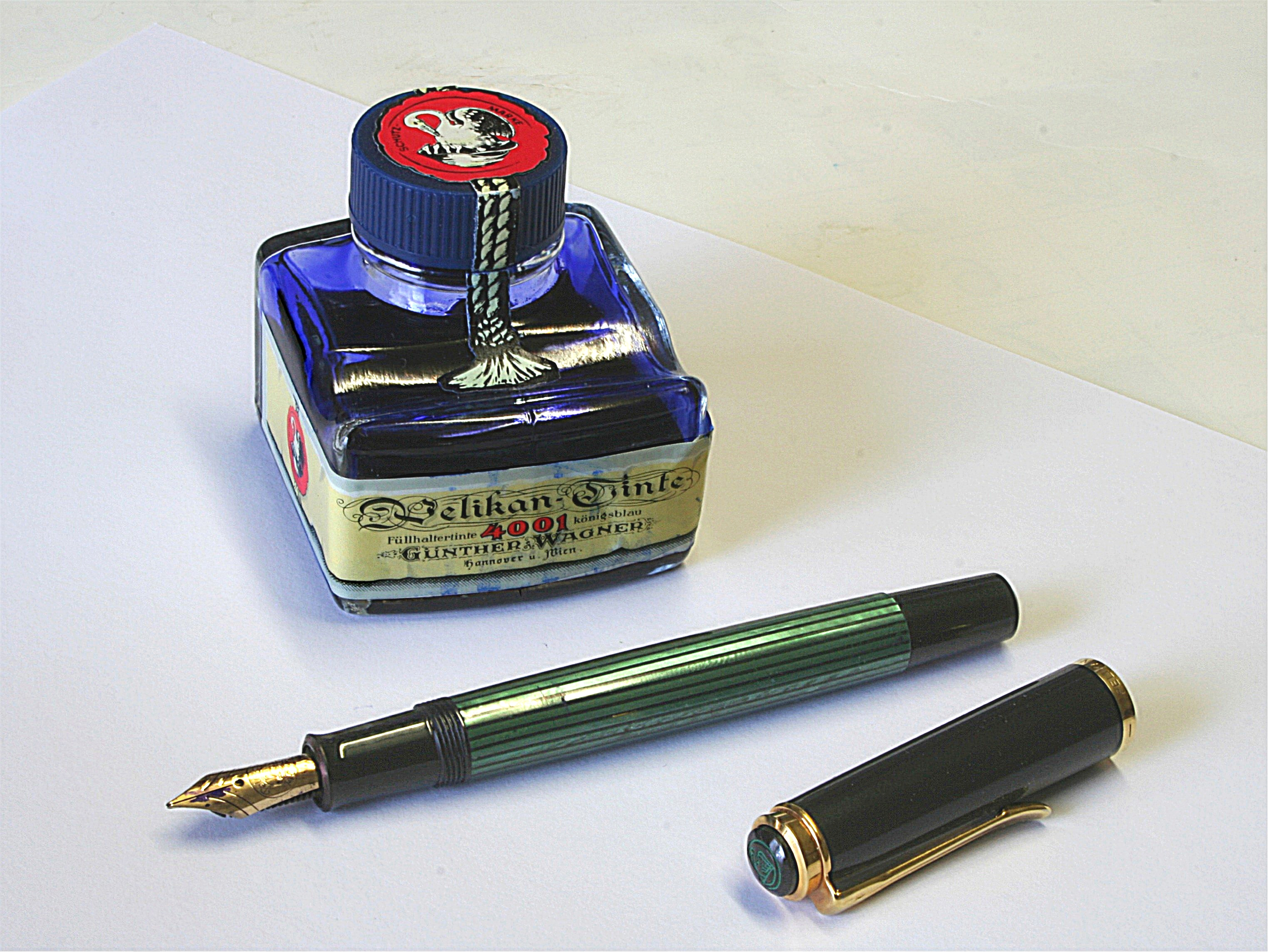
Pelikan M400 fountain pen and ink

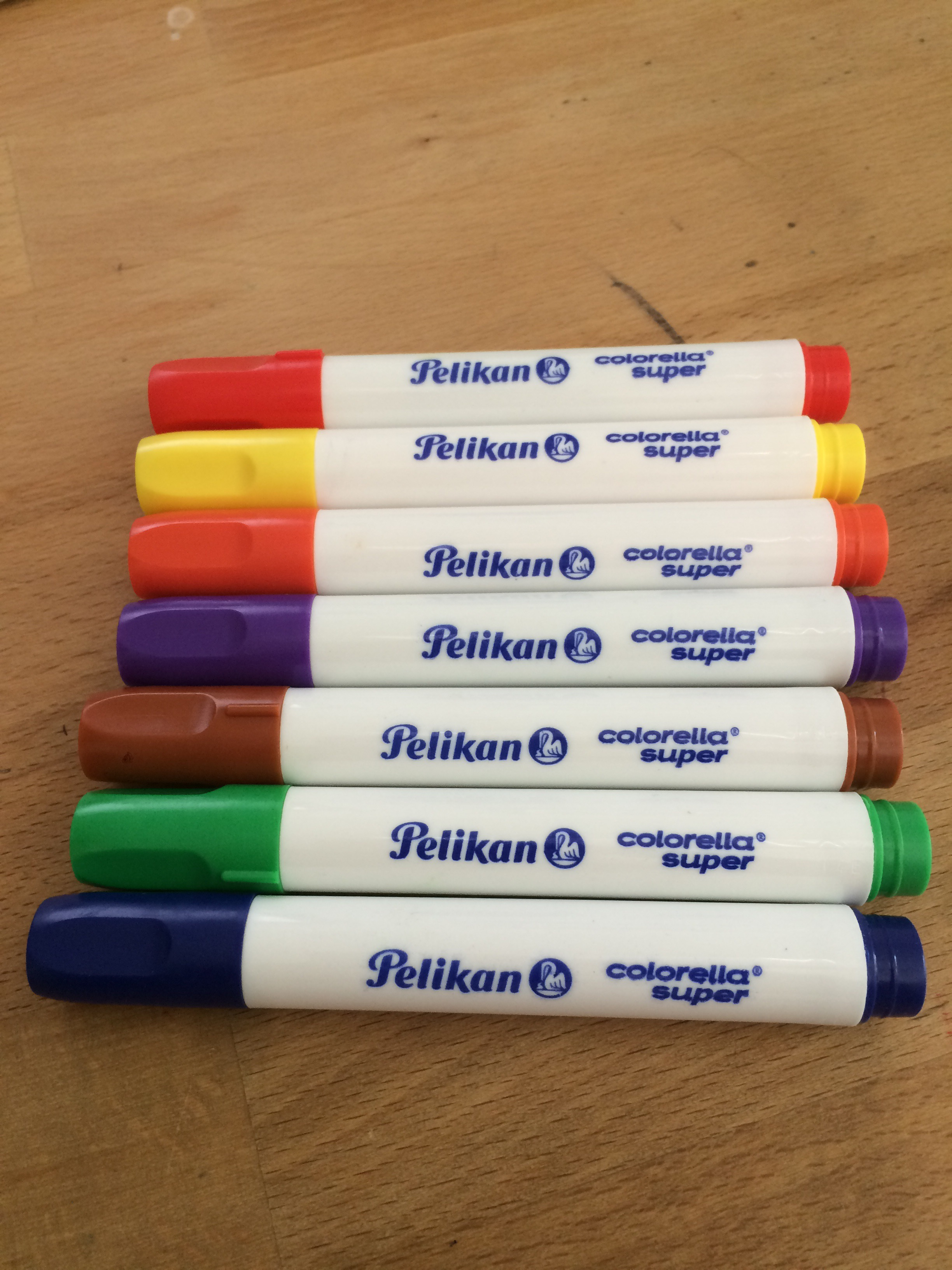
Pelikan markers

Type	Products
Writing implements	Fountain pens, rollerball pens, ballpoint pens, pen refills, fountain pen inks
Art materials	Watercolors, paints, Indian inks, varnish
Office supplies	Rubber stamp pads and inks, carbon papers
Accessories	Erasers, ink erasers

In the past Pelikan have also manufactured playing cards.
