= Michael Claesson =

Swedish chief of defence and army general

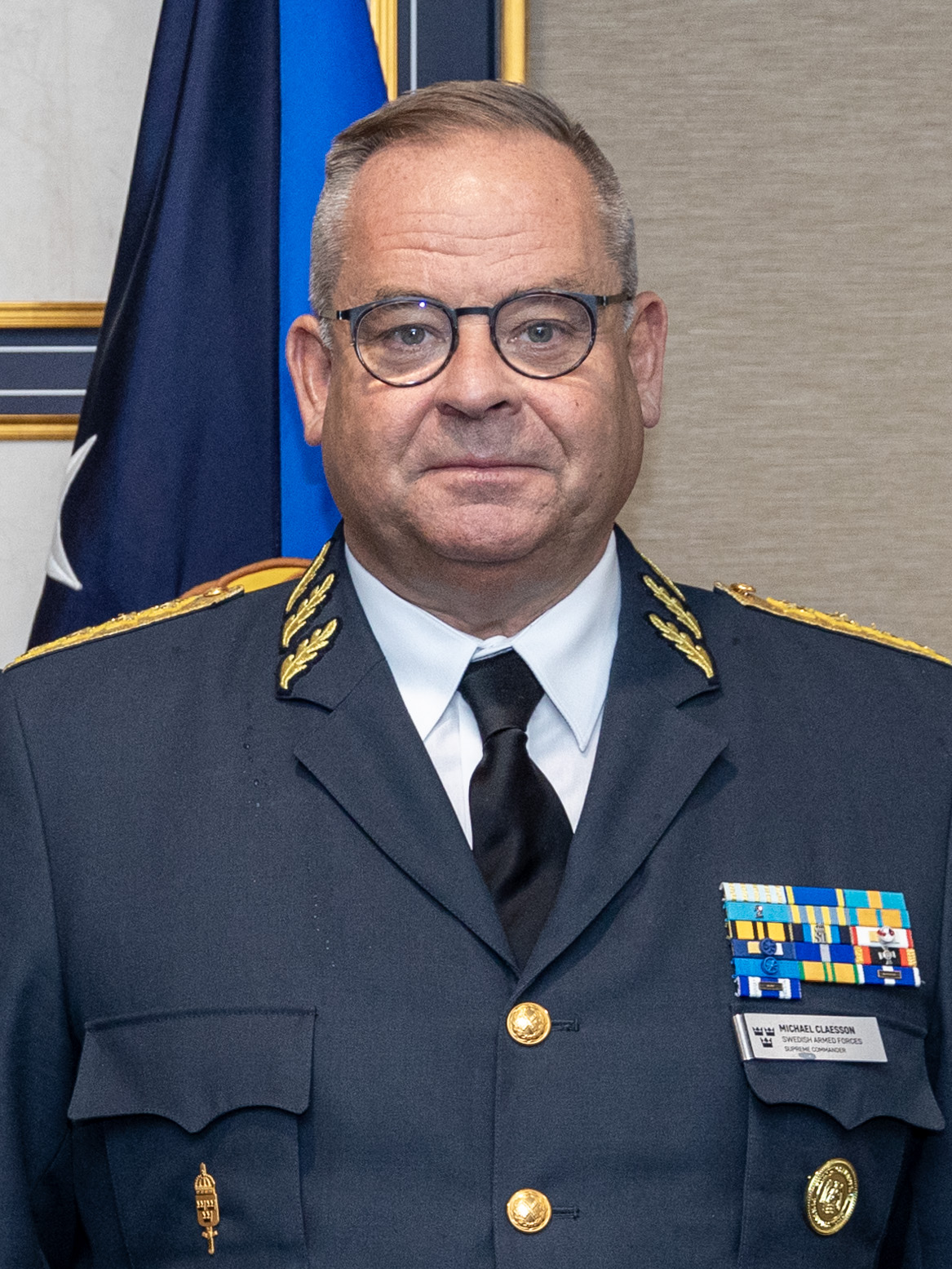
- Claesson in 2025
- Born: Leif Michael Claesson; 1 March 1965 (age 61); Bankeryd, Sweden
- Military career
- Allegiance: Sweden
- Branch: Swedish Army
- Service years: 1987–present
- Rank: General
- Commands: Norrbotten Armoured Battalion; Land Warfare Centre; FS 24, Afghanistan; Deputy Chief of Policy and Plans Department; Chief of Policy and Plans Department; Chief of Joint Operations; Commandant General in Stockholm; Chief of the Defence Staff; Chief of Defence
- Conflicts: Kosovo War; War in Afghanistan

Michael Claesson (born 1 March 1965) is a Swedish Army officer. He currently serves as the Chief of Defence since 1 October 2024. Claesson began his military career in 1984 as a tank commander. He advanced through various positions, including instructor and company commander, while completing education at military institutions in Sweden and Germany. By 2001, he became a lieutenant colonel, serving in both national and international roles, including as a military adviser to NATO and the EU. Promoted to brigadier general in 2013, Claesson held key leadership roles, such as commanding the Swedish ISAF contingent in Afghanistan and overseeing Nordic Battlegroup training. In 2018, he became a major general and Chief of Policy and Plans Department, later serving as Chief of Joint Operations and Commandant General in Stockholm in 2020. Promoted to lieutenant general, he became Chief of the Defence Staff in 2023. Finally, in 2024, he was appointed general and Chief of Defence, assuming the role on 1 October 2024.

== Early life ==
Claesson was born on 1 March 1965 in Jönköping and grew up in Bankeryd, where he lived until he commenced his military service in 1984. He did his military service as a tank commander operating Stridsvagn 103 tank in the 3rd Tank Company in the Norrbotten Armoured Battalion (I 19/P 5) in Boden from 4 June 1984 to 31 August 1985. From 1 August 1986, Claesson served as an instructor, platoon leader and battalion staff member of a tank company and an armored battalion respectively in the Scanian Dragoon Regiment (P 2) in Hässleholm. He also did two years as a teacher at the company management course (KHS HK) at the Swedish Armoured Troops Combat School (Pansartruppernas stridsskola, PS) in Skövde. He was commissioned as an officer in 1987 and was promoted to second lieutenant.

== Career ==
Claesson attended the Military Academy Karlberg's general course in Stockholm from 1988 to 1989 when he was promoted to lieutenant. He also attended the higher course from 1990 to 1991 when he was promoted to captain, and the Tactical Course for the Army (Taktisk kurs för Armén, TAK A) at the Swedish National Defence College in Stockholm from 1994 to 1995. Promoted to major in 1995, Claesson served between 1 July 1995 to 31 January 1997 as company commander and deputy company commander of the 83rd Staff Company and the 86th Tank Company in the Scanian Dragoon Regiment in Hässleholm. He was then a student at the German Armed Forces Language Agency (Bundessprachenamt, BSprA) in Hürth, Germany from 1 February 1997 to 31 August 1997. He was then the first Swedish student in Germany's national general staff training at the Bundeswehr Command and Staff College in Hamburg, Germany from 1 September 1997 to 30 September 1999.

Claesson served as a teacher of tactics and operational art at the Swedish National Defence College's Operational Institution (Operativa institution, FHS OpI) from 1 October 1999 to 30 August 2000 and he was Deputy Section Chief at KFOR HQ Operations Department (J 3 PLANS&CONOPS) in Pristina, Kosovo from 1 September 2000 to 30 April 2001. Promoted to lieutenant colonel in 2001, he served as a staff officer (administrator) in the Policy and Plans Department of the Strategic Plans and Policy Directorate (Strategiledningens inriktningsavdelning, STRA INRI) at the Swedish Armed Forces Headquarters in Stockholm from 1 September 2001 to 31 October 2002. Claesson then served as a military expert at the Ministry of Defence's Unit for Security Policy and International Affairs (Enheten för säkerhetspolitik och internationella frågor, Fö SI) from 1 November 2002 to 30 April 2003 and as commander and head of and training of Norrbotten Armoured Battalion in Norrbotten Regiment (I 19) in Boden from 1 May 2003 to 28 February 2005. He was then back at the Ministry of Defence's Unit for Security Policy and International Affairs, serving from 1 March 2005 to 31 July 2005. Claesson served as a military adviser and assistant military representative to Sweden's delegation to NATO at the NATO headquarters in Brussels and was accredited to Sweden's Permanent Representation to the EU from 1 August 2005 to 31 August 2007, then from 1 September 2007 to 31 August 2009. He was promoted to colonel in 2008.

Claesson served as exercise director (EXDIR) with responsibility for the Army's final exercises in 2010 and the training series for Nordic Battlegroup 11 (NBG 11) and as commanding officer of the Land Warfare Centre in Skövde from 1 September 2009 to 30 November 2010 and then from 1 December 2010 to 30 April 2012. He was commanding officer of the 24th Swedish contingent (FS 24) of the International Security Assistance Force (ISAF) as well as tactical commander of the multinational Task Force Northern Lights, Regional Command North of ISAF in Afghanistan from 1 May 2012 to 23 June 2013. Promoted to brigadier general in 2013, he served as a military adviser to the Ministry for Foreign Affairs in Stockholm from 24 June 2013 to 28 February 2015. Claesson was then Deputy Chief of Policy and Plans Department in the Defence Staff at the Swedish Armed Forces Headquarters from 1 March 2015 to 30 September 2018. He was promoted to major general and appointed Chief of Policy and Plans Department in the Defence Staff on 1 October 2018. On 25 June 2020, Claesson was appointed Chief of Joint Operations, succeeding Vice Admiral Jan Thörnqvist. Claesson assumed the position on 10 September 2020. He was promoted to lieutenant general on the same date. Also on 10 September 2020, Claesson assumed the position of Commandant General in Stockholm.

On 30 June 2022, the Swedish government appointed Claesson as Chief of the Defence Staff in the Swedish Armed Forces Headquarters from 1 January 2023. The then Chief of Air Force, Major General Carl-Johan Edström succeeded Claesson as Chief of Joint Operations as commander of the new Unit for Joint Operations. Edström was also promoted to lieutenant general. On 7 June 2024, Claesson was appointed general and Chief of Defence, and took office on 1 October 2024 after a formal handover ceremony at Karlberg Palace.

== Dates of rank ==
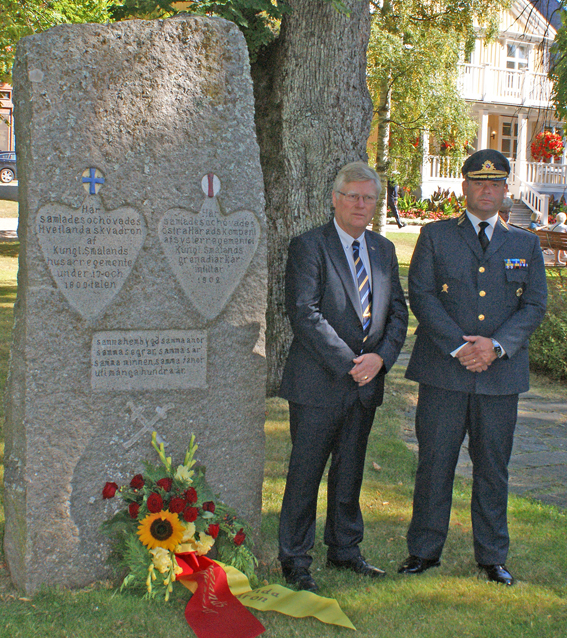
Claesson (right) and Vetlanda municipal commissioner Klas Håkansson in September 2013.

- 1987-09-01 – Second lieutenant
- 1989-07-01 – Lieutenant
- 1991-06-01 – Captain
- 1995-07-01 – Major
- 2001-04-01 – Lieutenant colonel
- 2008-03-03 – Colonel (brevet colonel from 1 August 2007)
- 2013-06-24 – Brigadier general
- 2018-10-01 – Major general
- 2020-09-10 – Lieutenant general
- 2024-10-01 – General

== Awards and decorations ==
=== Swedish ===
- (Sweden) King Carl XVI Gustaf's Jubilee Commemorative Medal IV (2023)
- (Sweden) For Zealous and Devoted Service of the Realm
- (Sweden) Swedish Armed Forces Conscript Medal
- (Sweden) Swedish Armed Forces International Service Medal (ISAF, Afghanistan & KFOR, Kosovo May 2013)
- (Sweden) National Swedish Association of Military Friendship Merit Badge (Sveriges Militära Kamratföreningarnas Riksförbunds förtjänsttecken, SMKRGFt) in gold (November 2022)
- (Sweden) Scanian Dragoon Regiment Commemorative Medal 1
- (Sweden) Scanian Dragoon Regiment Commemorative Medal 2

=== Foreign ===
- (Ukraine) Cross of Special Merit (29 April 2026)
- Commander 1st Class of the Order of the White Rose of Finland (May 2022)
- (Denmark) Commander 1st Class of the Order of the Dannebrog (26 April 2024)
- (Norway) Norwegian Armed Forces Medal for International Operations (Note: Awarded in light of the meritorious integration of Norwegian units into the Nordic Baltic Transition Support Unit, ISAF, Afghanistan 2013.) (May 2013)
- (Germany) Badge of Honour of the Bundeswehr in Silver (Note: The citation reads "for meritorious and successful cooperation within the framework of developing NATO's Partnership for Peace") (April 2007)
- (France) Officer of the Ordre national du Mérite (May 2022)
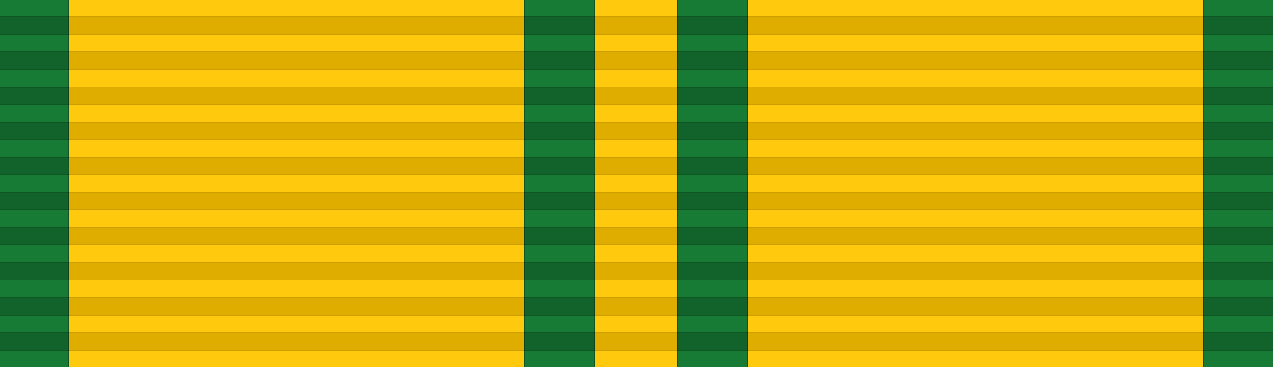
- (Netherlands) Cross for the Four Day Marches
- NATO Medal, KFOR, Kosovo (April 2001)
- NATO Medal, ISAF, Afghanistan (March 2013)

== Honours ==
- Member of the Royal Swedish Academy of War Sciences, Department I, Land Warfare Studies (2010)
- Member of the Folke Bernadotte Academy's advisory council (2016)
- Head of the Kungafonden ("The King's Fund")

== Footnotes ==
Military offices
Preceded by Klas Eksell	Land Warfare Centre; 2011–2012	Succeeded by Sven Antonsson as Acting
Preceded by Torbjörn Larsson as Commander, FS23	Commander, FS24; 2012–2013	Succeeded by Peder Ohlsson as Commander, FS25
Preceded by Mats Engman	Deputy Chief of Policy and Plans Department; 2015–2018	Succeeded by Lena Persson Herlitz
Preceded by Jonas Haggren	Chief of Policy and Plans Department; 2018–2020	Succeeded by Lena Persson Herlitz
Preceded by Jan Thörnqvist	Chief of Joint Operations; 2020–2022	Succeeded by Carl-Johan Edström
Preceded by Jan Thörnqvist	Commandant General in Stockholm; 2020–present	Incumbent
Preceded by None	Chief of the Defence Staff; 2023–2024	Succeeded by Carl-Johan Edström
Preceded by Micael Bydén	Chief of Defence; 2024–present	Incumbent
