= Chief of Policy and Plans Department =

- Chefen för ledningsstabens inriktningsavdelning
- Swedish Armed Forces
- Abbreviation: C LEDS INRI
- Member of: Defence Board
- Reports to: Chief of Defence Staff
- Seat: Swedish Armed Forces Headquarters, Lidingövägen 24, Stockholm
- Term length: No fixed term
- Constituting instrument: FIB 2020:5, Chapter 8, 41 §
- Formation: 2012
- First holder: Dennis Gyllensporre
- Final holder: Lena Persson Herlitz
- Abolished: 2022
- Deputy: Deputy Chief of Policy and Plans Department

The Chief of Policy and Plans Department (Swedish: Chefen för ledningsstabens inriktningsavdelning, C LEDS INRI) was the head of the Policy and Plans Department in the Defence Staff at the Swedish Armed Forces Headquarters. The Chief of Policy and Plans Department was part of the Defence Board (Försvarsmaktsledningen, FML), a group of the Supreme Commander's top commanders.

== Responsibilities ==
The Chief of Policy and Plans Department leads and develops the military strategic operations command. The task includes leading the work with defence planning, evaluating the rapid reaction organisation's (insatsorganisation) capabilities, evaluating developments abroad and proposing any activation of relevant parts of the defence plan or other emergency measures, and preparing the Supreme Commander of the Swedish Armed Forces's decision, and on behalf of the Chief of Defence Staff, deciding supplementary orders to FMO and directives within the Swedish Armed Forces Headquarters for the implementation of defence operations and operations.

The chief also prepares the Swedish Armed Forces' focus on intelligence and the security service (Försvarsmaktens inriktning av underrättelse och säkerhetstjänsten, FMInriUS). The Chief of Policy and Plans Department leads the Swedish Armed Forces' capability development. The task includes leading the preparation of the Swedish Armed Forces' Strategic Orientation (Försvarsmaktens Strategiska Inriktning, FMSI) and proposing long-term goals and requirements for operations, organization and products in all areas of activity. It also includes leading the preparation of the Swedish Armed Forces 'doctrines, leading the Swedish Armed Forces' research and technology development, studies and concept development, and leading operational demands on the war organization. The task also includes preparing the direction of the Swedish Armed Forces' cooperation with other states and international organizations, as well as the direction of defence attachés regarding bilateral relations and cooperation.

== Duties ==
The Chief of Policy and Plans Department shall support the Chief Financial Officer with requirements for equipment and logistics supply, and in the preparation of the early phases of investment planning with documentation from research and development assignments and studies. The Chief of Policy and Plans Department decides on directives at the Swedish Armed Forces Headquarters within the framework of defence planning, the Swedish Armed Forces' study and concept development plan, the Swedish Armed Forces' plan for group-wide research and development, including the focus of strategic collaborations, and the Swedish Armed Forces' strategy and focus plan for research and technology development.

The Chief of Policy and Plans Department was authorized to, within the framework of the tasks in § 41 and § 42 of FIB 2020:5 and assignments from the Supreme Commander of the Swedish Armed Forces and directives from the Chief of Defence Staff, enter into agreements and contracts with authorities, municipalities, regions, organizations and individuals.

== Chiefs of Policy and Plans Department ==
No.	Portrait	Chief of Defence Staff	Took office	Left office	Time in office	Defence branch	Prime Minister	Ref.
1	Dennis Gyllensporre	Major general Dennis Gyllensporre (born 1964)	January 2012	26 November 2014	-	Army	Fredrik Reinfeldt; Stefan Löfven	
2	Jonas Haggren	Rear admiral Jonas Haggren (born 1964)	27 November 2014	2018	-	Navy	Stefan Löfven	
-	Mats Engman	Major general Mats Engman (born 1954); Acting	22 January 2015	15 April 2015	83 days	Air Force	Stefan Löfven	
3	Michael Claesson	Major general Michael Claesson (born 1965)	1 October 2018	9 September 2020	1 year, 344 days	Army	Stefan Löfven	-
4	Lena Persson Herlitz	Major general Lena Persson Herlitz (born 1967)	10 September 2020	31 December 2022	2 years, 112 days	Navy (Amphibious Corps)	Stefan Löfven	

== Deputy Chiefs of Policy and Plans Department ==
No.	Portrait	Chief of Defence Staff	Took office	Left office	Time in office	Defence branch	Prime Minister	Ref.
1	Ingela Mathiasson	Colonel; Ingela Mathiasson (born 1961)	15 May 2013	31 December 2013	230 days	Air Force	Fredrik Reinfeldt	
2	Mats Engman	Brigadier general Mats Engman (born 1954)	1 January 2014	21 January 2015	1 year, 20 days	Air Force	Fredrik Reinfeldt; Stefan Löfven	
-	Anders Löfberg	Colonel; Anders Löfberg (born 1959); Acting	22 January 2015	28 February 2015	37 days	Army	Stefan Löfven	
3	Michael Claesson	Brigadier general Michael Claesson (born 1965)	1 March 2015	30 September 2018	3 years, 213 days	Army	Stefan Löfven	
4	Lena Persson Herlitz	Brigadier general Lena Persson Herlitz (born 1967)	1 February 2019	9 September 2020	1 year, 221 days	Navy (Amphibious Corps)	Stefan Löfven	
5	Johan Pekkari	Brigadier general Johan Pekkari (born 1971)	10 September 2020	31 December 2022	2 years, 112 days	Army	Stefan Löfven	
