= Chalkboard eraser =

Type of eraser designed to erase chalk

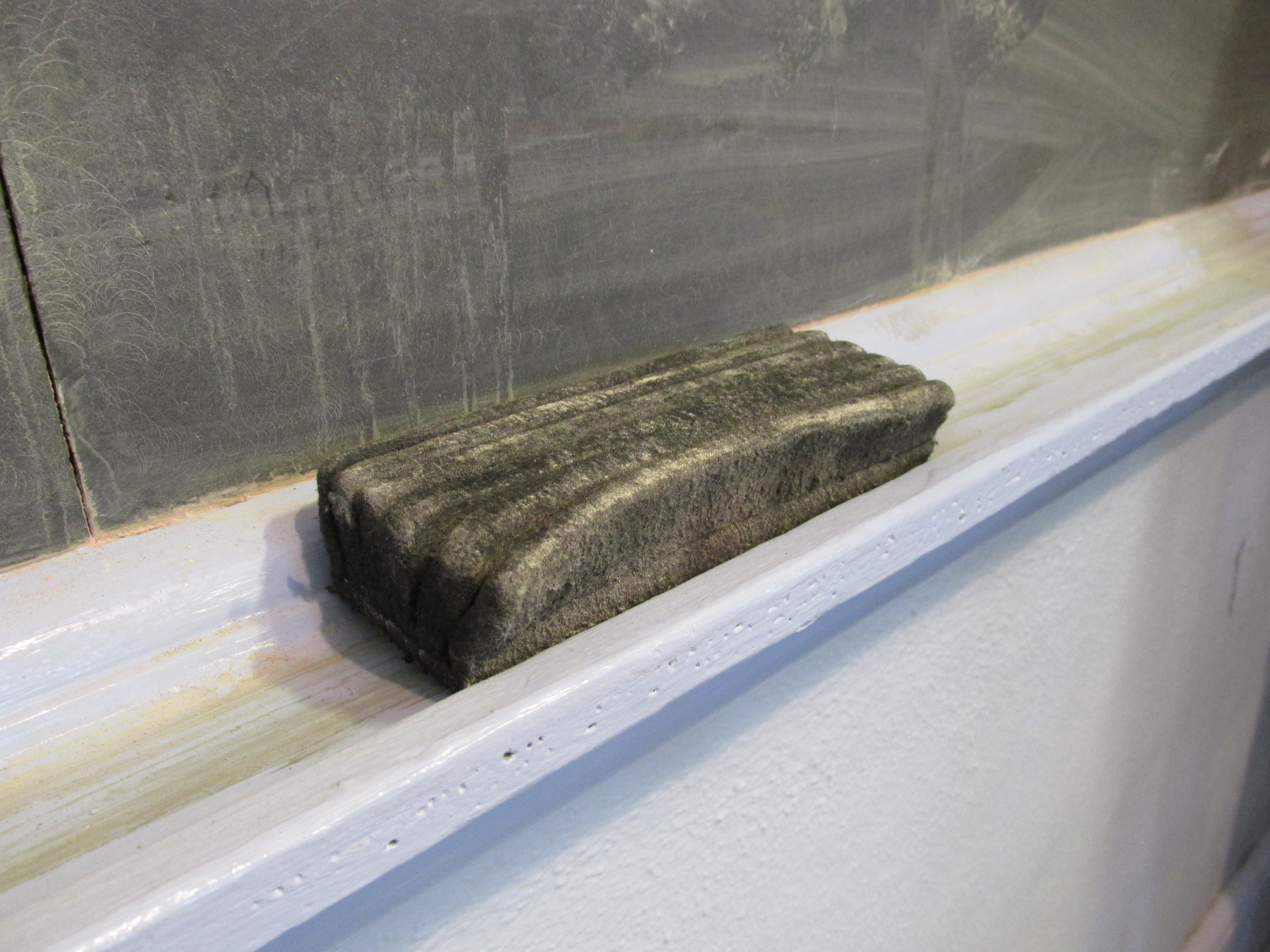
Chalkboard eraser

A chalkboard eraser (sometimes known as a duster in India) is a special type of eraser specifically used to erase chalk markings on slating paint (used on chalkboards and slates). It is most commonly made of felt strips attached to a handle. Chalkboard erasers are typically broad and rectangular, intended to clear large areas for new content as part of a lecture or presentation.

== History ==
Chalkboard erasers were invented around 1863 by John L. Hammett, who owned some stores that sold and created school products in Rhode Island and then later in Boston. Mostly slates were sold there as well as chalk and so on. At the time, rags or old cloths were used to erase and get rid of the chalk markings on slates in schools, offices, and for the most part, everywhere. Hammett created the chalkboard before the invention of the chalkboard eraser by creating slating paint. Hammett then, during a presentation on his chalkboard "discovered" that wool felt strips wiped off the chalk writing better than rags. Following this discovery he gathered a team to create the custom eraser for sale. The erasers proved to be a success for Hammett and, later in the 19th century, he created a company that also sold inexpensive supplies for teachers and schools, such as paper and ink. Hammett ultimately sold the company.

== See also ==
- Eraser
