= Lena Persson Herlitz =

Swedish Amphibious Corps officer (born 1967)

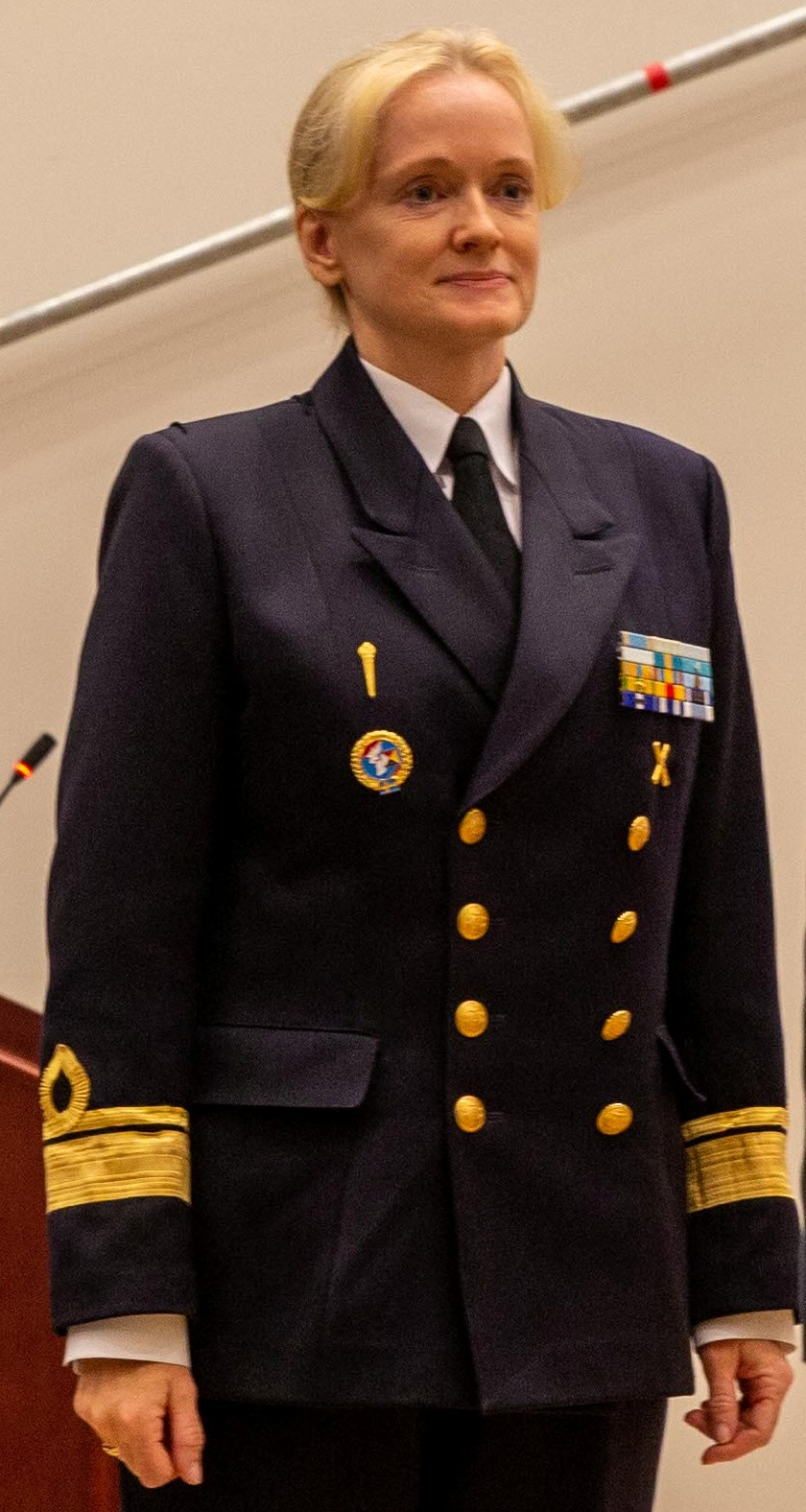
- Persson Herlitz in 2023.
- Born: Lena Maria Persson; 12 August 1967 (age 59)
- Military career
- Allegiance: Sweden
- Branch: Swedish Navy (Amphibious Corps)
- Service years: 1991–present
- Rank: Major General
- Commands: Swedish National Intelligence Cell; Afghanistan Desk, MUST; KS 21; M3 PLANS, Dep COS, Maritime Component Command; Swedish Armed Forces International Centre; Deputy Chief of Policy and Plans Department; Chief of Policy and Plans Department; NNSC; D ASG-1, Joint Intelligence and Security Division, NATO headquarters
- Conflicts: Yugoslav Wars: Bosnian War; Kosovo War; War in Afghanistan

Major General Lena Maria Persson Herlitz née Persson (born 12 August 1967) is a Swedish Amphibious Corps officer who currently serves as Deputy Assistant Secretary General Intelligence at the Joint Intelligence and Security Division at NATO headquarters in Brussels, Belgium. Persson Herlitz began her military career in 1991 with the Älvsborg Coastal Artillery Regiment. After officer training, she served in the 5th Amphibious Battalion, including a deployment to Bosnia and Herzegovina (1997–1998). She later worked as adjutant to the regimental commander and became a company commander after completing staff training. In 2006, she joined the Swedish Military Intelligence and Security Service (MUST), focusing on the Democratic Republic of the Congo and later Afghanistan, where she led the Swedish National Intelligence Cell in Kabul. She also served as aide-de-camp to Crown Princess Victoria and commanded the Swedish contingent in Kosovo in 2010.

She held several leadership roles, including deputy chief of staff within the Maritime Component Command, and served as a UN military advisor in Afghanistan in 2012. In 2013, she became commander of SWEDINT, which under her leadership became the first NATO-certified training center of its kind. After serving as military adviser at the Ministry of Defence, she became head of Training at the Swedish Armed Forces Headquarters (2017), then Deputy Chief (2019) and later Chief (2020) of the Policy and Plans Department, being promoted to brigadier general and subsequently major general. She also served on the Defence Board. From June 2023 to April 2025, she headed the Swedish delegation to the Neutral Nations Supervisory Commission (NNSC) in Korea before being succeeded by Major General Fredrik Ståhlberg.

== Career ==
Persson Herlitz began her military career in Älvsborg Coastal Artillery Regiment (KA 4) in Gothenburg in 1991. In 1989, all positions within the Swedish Armed Forces were opened for women, and the military interest in combination with the search for a challenge made her enlist in 1991. She came to serve in a mobile barrier company. In 1993–1994, she attended officer training at the Swedish Navy Officers’ College (Marinens officershögskola, MOHS). From 1995 to 1996 she was placed in the 5th Amphibious Battalion as an instructor for command and communication systems. From 1997 to 1998 Persson Herlitz served in the Swedish battalion BA09 in Bosnia and Herzegovina. There she served as deputy chief of staff platoon; also driver and gunner of a 12.7 mm machine gun with one of the platoon's Patria Pasi armoured personnel carriers. Back in Sweden, she served as platoon commander in the 5th Amphibious Battalion. In 2000, she became an adjutant to the regimental commander of Amf 4, Colonel Bo Andersson, and later, after completing staff training at the Swedish National Defence College, became company commander of the 5th Amphibious Battalion during the years 2003–2004. Amf 4 was disbanded in connection with the Defense Act of 2004 and Persson Herlitz was offered a job in Stockholm and attended the management program at the Swedish National Defence College in the years 2004–2006, which was a prerequisite for becoming a lieutenant colonel.

In 2006, she was offered a position at the Swedish Military Intelligence and Security Service (MUST) and initially became an analyst specializing in the Democratic Republic of the Congo. From August 2007 to April 2008, she served as head of the Swedish National Intelligence Cell in Kabul, Afghanistan. Back in Sweden, she returned to MUST as head of the Afghanistan Desk and then also had to take responsibility for the entire Asia section May 2008. She served in this position until December 2009. From 2008, Persson Herlitz served one month a year as Aide-de-camp to Victoria, Crown Princess of Sweden. In January 2010, Persson Herlitz was appointed commander of KS21, the Swedish contingent within Kosovo Force (KFOR) in Kosovo. She served there until October 2010, and in November the same year she was appointed head of M3 PLANS, Deputy Chief of Staff within the Maritime Component Command at the Swedish Armed Forces Headquarters in Stockholm. In March 2012, Persson Herlitz was deployed again to Afghanistan, this time as military advisor for the United Nations Assistance Mission in Afghanistan (UNAMA) in Kabul. She left this position in December the same year. During this time, she also served as contingent commander team leader for the Afghan National Security Forces.

Upon her return to Sweden, on 1 January 2013, Persson Herlitz took command over the Swedish Armed Forces International Centre (SWEDINT). SWEDINT is the Swedish Armed Forces' competence centers for integrated multinational staff training. During this time, SWEDINT became the first training center in the world to become NATO certified. Persson Herlitz was then appointed military adviser at the Ministry of Defence's Unit for Military Capability and Operations (MFI), serving there from October 2014 to March 2017. In April 2017, Persson Herlitz assumed the position of head of Training Department in the Training & Procurement Staff at the Swedish Armed Forces Headquarters. On 1 February 2019, Persson Herlitz was appointed Deputy Chief of Policy and Plans Department in the Defence Staff and promoted to brigadier general. There she worked mainly with issues with defence planning and international cooperation. She also served as military strategic operations commander. On 13 August 2020, the Supreme Commander of the Swedish Armed Forces appointed Persson Herlitz to Chief of Policy and Plans Department. She took up her new post on 10 September 2020 and was promoted to major general in connection with this. She is also part of the Defence Board (Försvarsmaktsledningen, FML). She was succeeded on the Deputy Chief of Policy and Plans Department post by Brigadier General Johan Pekkari.

Persson Herlitz was placed at the disposal of the Supreme Commander of the Swedish Armed Forces from 1 January 2023. On 1 June 2023, she succeeded Major General Anders Callert as head of the Swedish delegation to the Neutral Nations Supervisory Commission (NNSC) in Korea. On 28 April 2025, after almost two years in Korea, she was succeeded by Major General Major General Fredrik Ståhlberg.

The Swedish Armed Forces placed Persson Herlitz at the disposal of the Chief of the Defence Staff from 23 September 2025. On 1 November 2025, she assumed the position as head of the Defence Staff's Support Unit (Försvarsstabens stödenhet, FST STÖD). On 1 December 2025, Persson Herlitz was appointed Deputy Assistant Secretary General Intelligence (D ASG-1) at the Joint Intelligence and Security Division (JISD) at NATO headquarters in Brussels, Belgium. She assumed her new role on 1 July 2026.

== Dates of rank ==
- 1994 – Second lieutenant
- 19?? – Lieutenant
- 19?? – Captain
- 2003 – Major
- 2006 – Lieutenant colonel
- 2013 – Colonel
- 2019 – Brigadier general
- 2020 – Major general

== Awards and decorations ==
=== Swedish ===
- (Sweden) For Zealous and Devoted Service of the Realm
- (Sweden) King Carl XVI Gustaf's Jubilee Commemorative Medal II (23 August 2013)
- (Sweden) H. M. The King's Medal, 8th size gold (silver-gilt) medal worn on the chest suspended by the Order of the Seraphim ribbon (2014)
- (Sweden) Crown Princess Victoria and Prince Daniel's Wedding Commemorative Medal (8 June 2010)
- (Sweden) Swedish Armed Forces Conscript Medal
- (Sweden) Swedish Armed Forces International Service Medal
- (Sweden) Life Guards Medal of Merit III in silver
- (Sweden) 4th Marine Regiment Commemorative Medal (Älvsborgs amfibieregementes minnesmedalj, ÄlvsbamfregMSM)

=== Foreign ===
- (South Korea) 3rd Class of the Order of National Security Merit, Cheonsu Medal (28 April 2025)
- (United States) Officer of the Legion of Merit (28 April 2025)
- NATO medal for the former Yugoslavia
- NATO Non-Article 5 medal for ISAF
- NATO Non-Article 5 medal for the Balkans
- Medal of Honor of the Army of the Czech Republic

Military offices
Preceded by Jerker Svensson	Swedish Armed Forces International Centre; 2013–2014	Succeeded by Peter Fredriksson
Preceded by Michael Claesson	Deputy Chief of Policy and Plans Department; 2019–2020	Succeeded by Johan Pekkari
Preceded by Michael Claesson	Chief of Policy and Plans Department; 2020–2022	Succeeded by None
Preceded by Anders Callert	Head of Swedish Delegation to NNSC; 2023–2025	Succeeded by Fredrik Ståhlberg
