= Günter Herlitz =

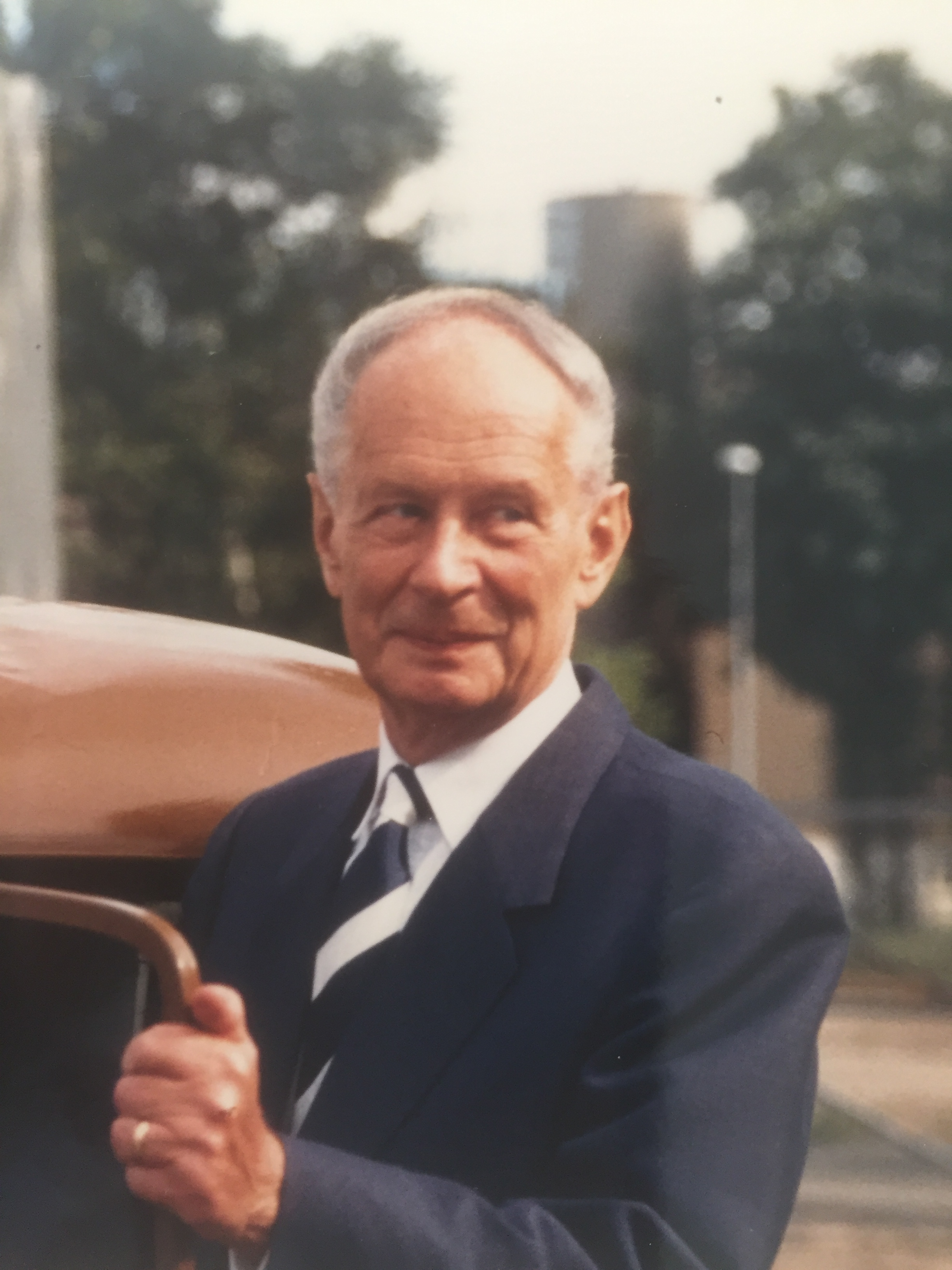
Günter Herlitz, Berlin, 1988

Günter Herlitz (February 9, 1913 – September 11, 2010) was born in Berlin as the son of Carl Herlitz[de], founder of the Herlitz stationery company.

== Biography ==
Following the founding of the company by his father in 1904, Günter Herlitz took over the business in 1935. He expanded the company from Berlin into Mark Brandenburg and already counted six employees to help with the business. When he was conscripted for military service during the Second World War, Günter Herlitz's mother took on the running of the business.

During the Second World War, the business premises were destroyed by bombs several times, and thus Günter Herlitz resumed business operations in 1945, following completion of his military service, in a basement in the Berlin district of Moabit. Initially selling bargains of all kinds, the Herlitz company was the only one of around 20 Berlin wholesalers to succeed in securing a minimal amount of goods during the Berlin Blockade. When the blockade ended, the company extended its product range considerably. As one of the most important wholesale firms nationwide, Herlitz was able to employ 50 people by 1950.

Due to the political situation in Germany at the time, it became increasingly difficult for the company to get its goods from West Germany to Berlin. As a result, Günter Herlitz decided to manufacture his own stationery. The company began with the production of exercise books, drawing pads and index cards. In 1955, the company was already processing 60 tons of paper each month. Even though the political situation at the time initially prevented Herlitz from supplying customers outside West Berlin, the company was able to boast an annual turnover circa 1.1 million Euro.

Initial attempts to sell the products on the West German market were unsuccessful; however, in 1960, the breakthrough came about with notebooks and drawing pads with illustrated covers, which was an absolute novelty at the time. In the following years, from 1960 to 1994, the company was able to double its turnover each year. This meant an increase in annual turnover from 2 million Euros in 1960 to 885 million Euros in 1994.

In 1996, Günter Herlitz was honoured for his life's work at the company's general meeting and resigned from the board of management. He became the company's honorary chairman. From then on, he never attended another general meeting of the company.

To this day, the company headquarters are located in Berlin.

After the death of Günter Herlitz in September 2010, his family continues his social commitment and is amongst the most active families in Berlin. In 2003 his son, Dr Klaus Herlitz and his wife founded the Buddy Bear Help children's charities organization.
