= Ink eraser =

Writing implement

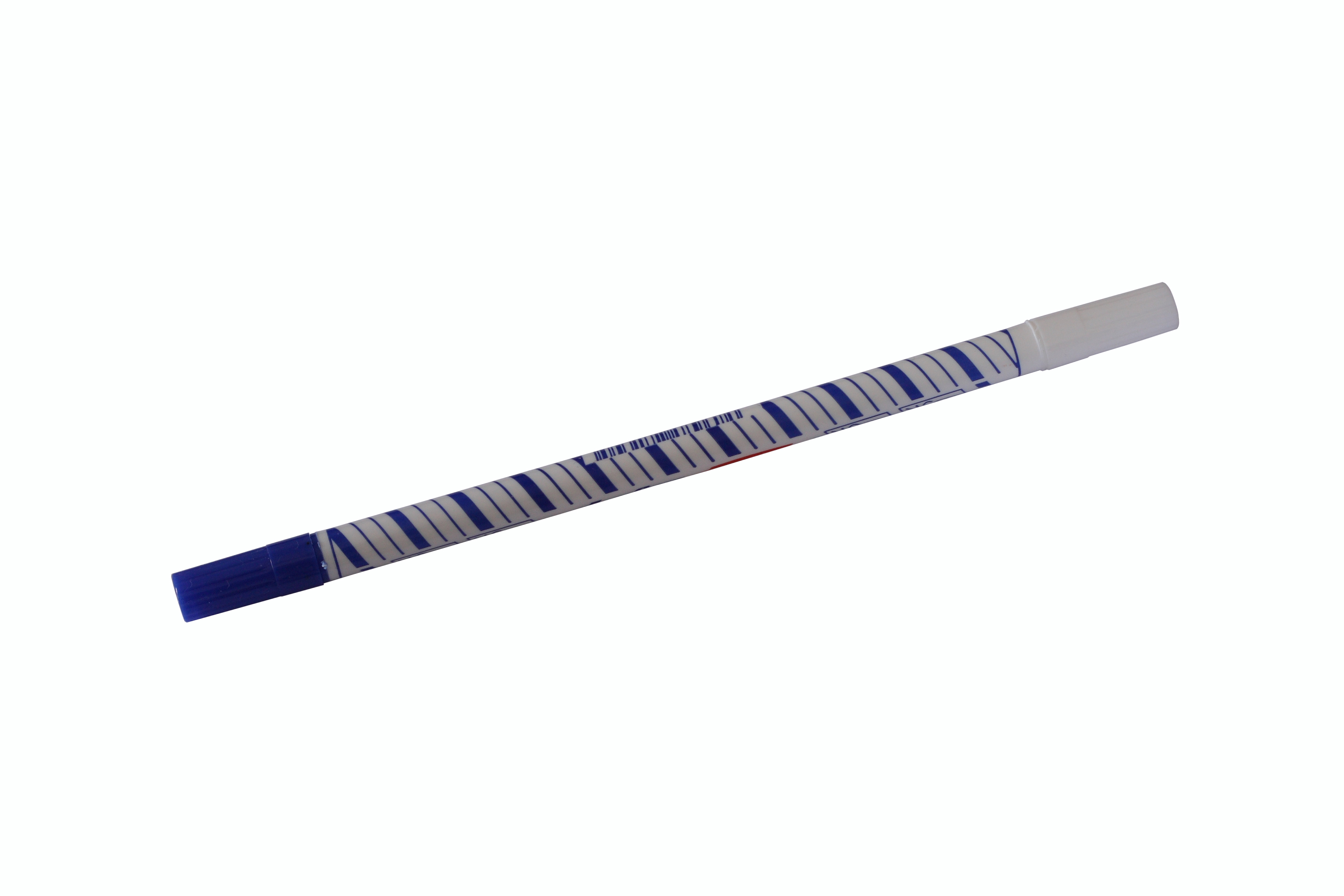
A chemical ink eraser – Eradicator felt tip under white cap at right, blue felt tip for writing over erased section under blue cap at left.

An ink eraser is an instrument used to scrape away or chemically bleach ink from a writing surface. This is a more involved process than removing pencil markings. Pencil marks can be gradually adhered to natural rubber fragments by rubbing the mark with a pencil eraser (this action is what prompted Joseph Priestley to give solidified latex its common name). Ink, however, readily penetrates the fibers of most papers and is therefore more difficult to extract by mechanical action.

Older ink erasers are therefore small knives designed to scrape off the top few microns of a sheet of paper, removing the ink that had penetrated. In concert with bladed ink erasers, an eraser similar to those at the end of pencils was also used, with additional abrasives, such as sand, mixed into the rubber. Fibreglass ink erasers also work by abrasion. These erasers physically remove the ink and the paper it has marked from the larger sheet.

The chemical ink eradicator contains a substance that reacts with some inks removing their pigmentation and hiding the writing.

== Metal ink erasers ==
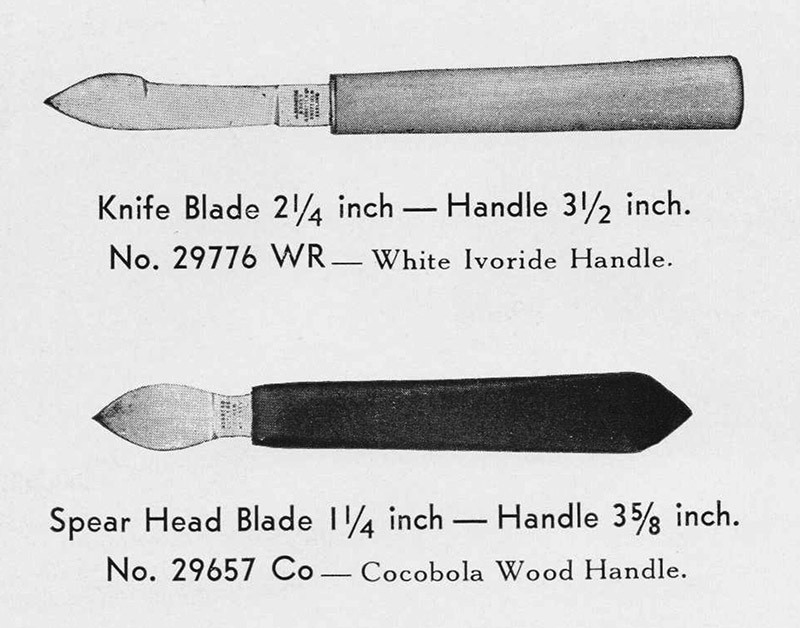
A pair of bladed ink erasers, similar to the one that ended George Millet's life on February 15, 1909, advertised in the March 1909 issue of the Sears Catalog

When almost all permanent writing was done in ink, steel ink erasers were in wide use before the invention of chemical ink erasers. Metal erasers were essentially small knives, used to shave away or scrape off ink from a writing surface.

== Chemical ink erasers ==
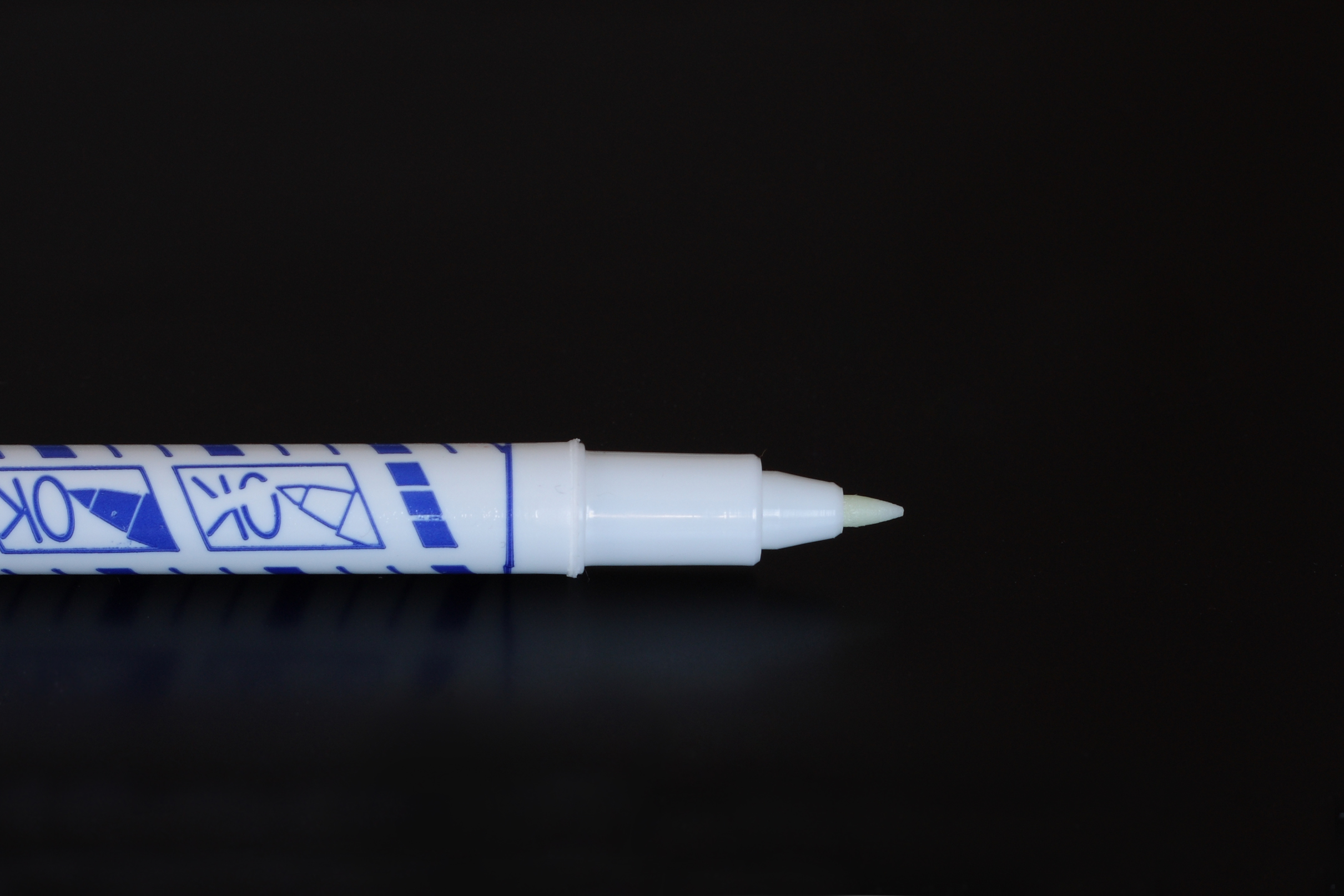
A modern chemical ink eraser

The chemical ink eraser was invented by the German manufacturer Pelikan in the 1930s and was introduced as a novelty in Germany in 1972 under the name Tintentiger (ink tiger).

Chemical ink erasers break down royal blue ink by disrupting the geometry of the dye molecules in ink so that light is no longer filtered. The molecules are disrupted by sulfite or hydroxide ions binding to the central carbon atoms of the dye. The ink is not destroyed by the erasing process, but is made invisible. It can be transformed back into a visible work with aldehydes.

The eradicator only works with certain inks. Erasable inks of various colors exist, but royal blue is the most common. After applying the eradicator, erasable ink cannot be applied in the erased area of the paper, where the chemicals remain. For this reason, eradicators usually include a permanent blue felt tip that allows the user to write in the erased area.

== See also ==
- Deinking
- Eraser
- Correction fluid
