= Scanian Dragoon Regiment (armoured) =

- Skånska dragonregementet
- Active: 1942–2000
- Country: Sweden
- Allegiance: Swedish Armed Forces
- Branch: Swedish Army
- Type: Armoured
- Size: Regiment
- Part of: I. milo (1942–1966); Milo S (1966–2000)
- Garrison/HQ: Hässleholm
- Mottos: Trohet, ansvar, rättrådighet ("Faithfulness, responsibility, righteousness")
- Colors: Black and yellow
- March: "Marcia per il Sultano Mahmoud" (Donizetti) (Note: The marsch was established in 1953 by Army Order 33/1953. It was used by the Scanian Dragoon Brigade (Skånska dragonbrigaden) from 1994 to 2000 and by the Skånska dragongruppen from 2000 to 2004.)
- Anniversaries: 28 October (Note: In memory of the Battle of Poniec on 28 October 1704.)
- Battle honours: Lund (1676), Landskrona (1677), Kliszów (1702), Pułtusk (1703), Punitz (1704), Fraustadt (1706), Rajovka (1708), Bornhöved (1813)

Insignia
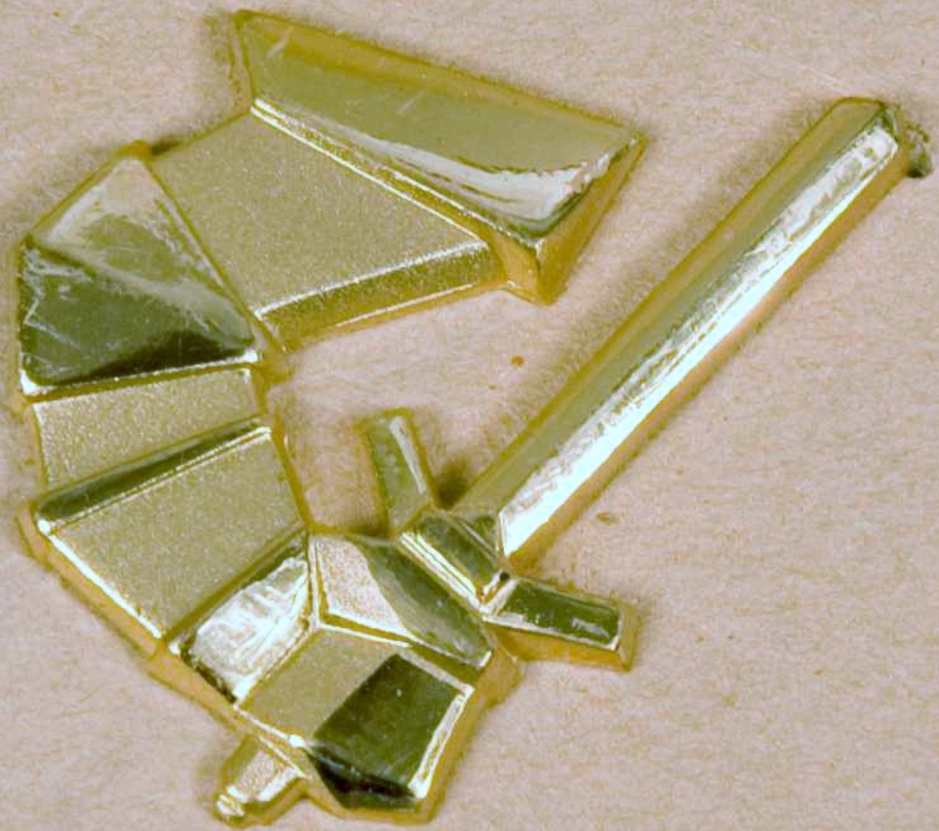
- Branch insignia

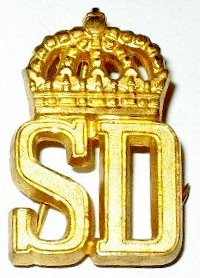
- Unit insignia

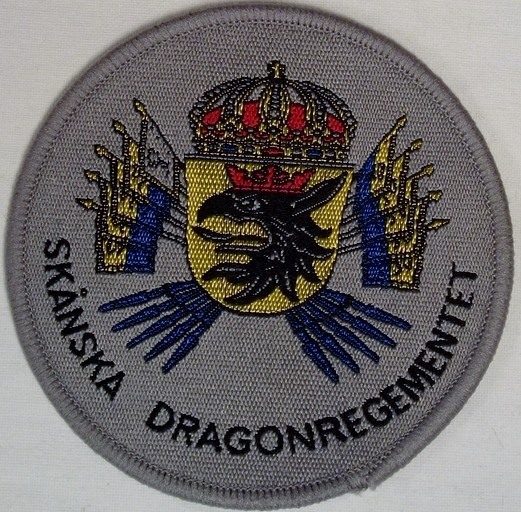
- Shoulder sleeve insignia

The Scanian Dragoon Regiment (Swedish: Skånska dragonregementet), designated P 2 and P 2/Fo 14, was an armored regiment of the Swedish Army with its roots in the 17th century. The unit was first based in Helsingborg and later in Hässleholm.

== History ==
The regiment was converted from a cavalry regiment to an armored regiment in 1942. The regiment was trained as pioneers in armoured warfare in Helsingborg between 1942 and 1947. At the start, they were crowded in the regiment built for five squadrons, which would now receive armored units with ten companies. The training area in Torekov was less useful and in 1943 the Ravlunda training area was purchased. After reconnaissance and political considerations, the training areas in Hässleholm were purchased in 1944. The construction period ended and on 30 September 1947, the regiment moved into Hässleholm.

The original tanks m/38, m/40 and m/42 were replaced in 1953 by Stridsvagn 81 (Centurion). The regiment had to lead the introduction and retraining of this significantly better tank. It also required better training areas and therefore the Ravlunda training area expanded in 1956 to double the area. The anti-tank guided missile training began in 1957. In addition to the Centurion training, from 1960, stridsvagn 74 units were also trained. The rearmament was completed by the Centurion stock. In 1963, the regiment changed its name to the Scanian Dragoon Regiment.

The brigade's KP-bil's were exchanged during the 1950s for Pansarbandvagn 301 and from 1968 for Pansarbandvagn 302. At the same time, Stridsvagn 103 was added to the regiment this year and crowned the introduction tests with a long march from Skövde via Malmö to Ravlunda and combat exercise with two companies. The Scanian Logistics Regiment (T 4) was grouped together with the regiment in 1986 and was part of the regiment from 1991.

== Locations and training areas ==
=== Barracks ===
The establishment in Helsingborg, which was the regiment's first base, had an infrastructure that was dimensioned for five squadrons, while the armored regiment was to train ten companies. In the barracks area in Helsingborg, a number of barracks were built for both accommodation and school halls. These were later moved to Ravlunda, and formed the backbone of Dammåkra camp.

The 1 October 1947 was the official date that the regiment operated from Hässleholm. By co-locating the Scanian Logistics Regiment (T 4) with the Scanian Dragoon Regiment, a rebuilding and extension of the military restaurant and other extensions cost SEK 139.6 million. From 1 July 1994, Wendes Artillery Regiment and the staff of Kristianstad Defence District (Kristianstads försvarsområde, Fo 14) was co-located with the regiment.

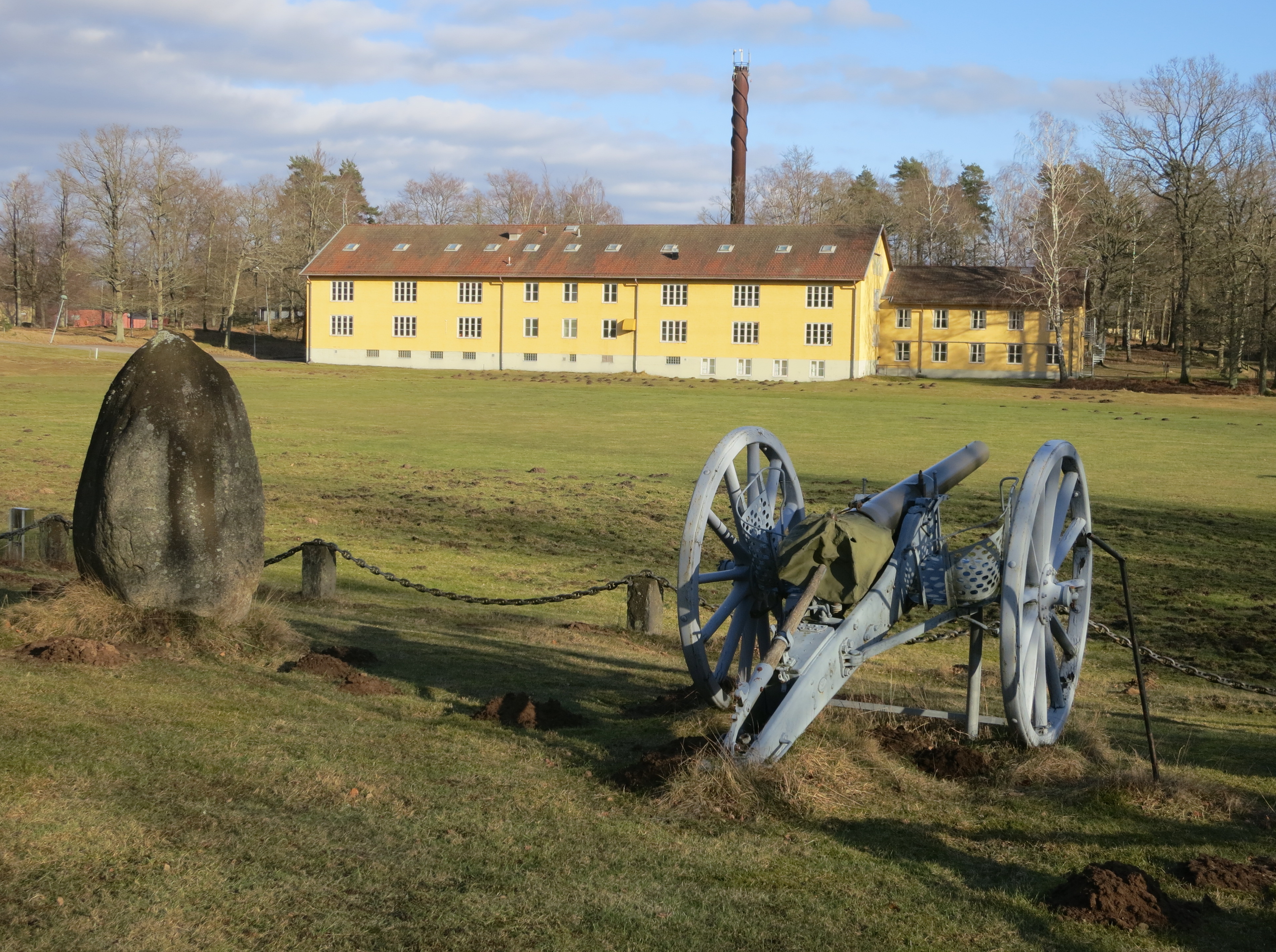
Barracks, Hässleholm

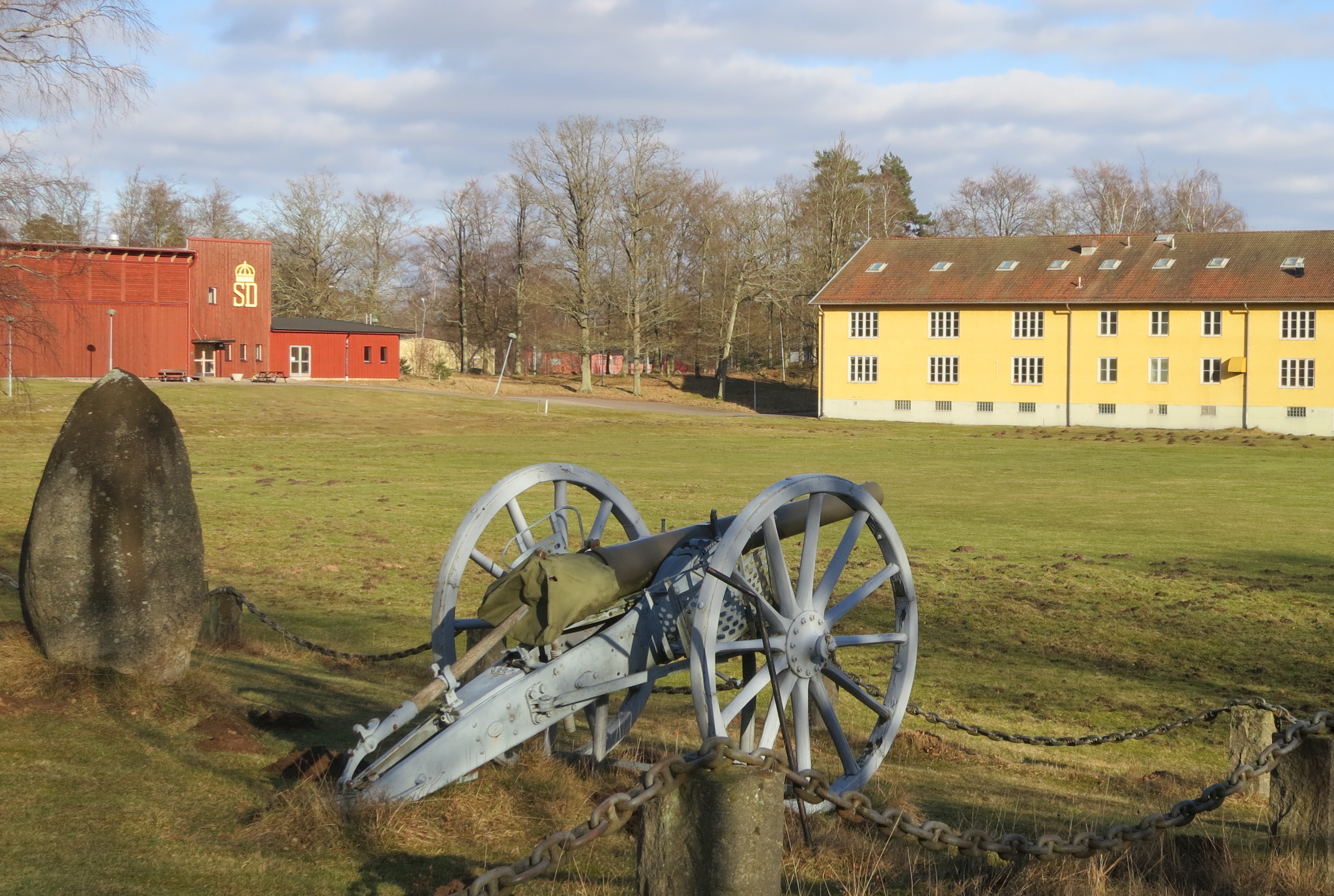
Barracks, Hässleholm

=== Training areas ===
The units training areas included Ravlunda, Hovdala (together with Wendes Artillery Regiment) and Mölleröd.

== Heraldry and traditions ==
=== Coat of arms ===
The coat of arms was used by the Scanian Dragoon Regiment (P 2) from 1977 to 1994 and by the Scanian Dragoon Brigade (Skånska dragonbrigaden, (PB 8/MekB 8) from 1994 to 2000. Blazon: "Or, the regimental badge, an erazed head of a griffin sable with open crown gules. The shield is surmounted ten squadron standards, placed in two groups of five in saltire, the uppermost dexter on argent arms or, the others fessed yellow and blue and charged with an erazed head of a griffin gules".

The coat of arms was used by the North Scanian Dragoon Regiment (P 2/Fo 14) from 1994 to 2000 and the Scanian Dragoon Group (Skånska dragongruppen, SDG) in Hässleholm from 2000 to 2004. Blazon: "Or, the badge of former Kristianstad County, an erazed head of a griffin gules with open crown azure carrying five plums - red, argent, red, argent, red - and arms azure. The shield is surmounted ten squadron standards, placed in two groups of five in saltire, the uppermost dexter on argent arms or, the others fessed yellow and blue and charged with an erazed head of a griffin gules".

Coat of arms used by P 2 (1977–1994) and PB 8/MekB 8 (1994–2000)

Coat of arms used by P 2/Fo 14 (1994–2000) and SDG (2000–2004)

=== Colours, standards and guidons ===
A unit standard was presented to the former Scanian Dragoon Regiment on 1 October 1992 by the His Majesty the King Carl XVI Gustaf at Stockholm Palace. It was used as regimental standard by P 2 up to 30 June 2000 and then as brigade standard by the Scanian Dragoon Brigade (MekB 8) until 1 July 2000. The standard is drawn by Ingrid Lamby and embroidered by machine in insertion technique by the company Libraria and Gunilla Hjort. Blazon: "On yellow cloth the badge of the regiment; an erazed black head of a griffin with an open red crown. On a black border at the upper side of the standard, battle honours (Lund 1676, Punitz 1704, Landskrona 1677, Fraustadt 1706, Kliszów 1702 Rajovka 1708, Pułtusk 1703, Bornhöft 1813) in yellow. Yellow fringe".

A unit guidon was presented to the then North Scanian Dragoon Regiment on 30 June 1994 His Majesty the King Carl XVI Gustaf at Stortorget in Hässleholm. It was used as regimental guidon by P 2/Fo 14 until 1 July 2000. The guidon is drawn by Bengt Olof Kälde and embroidered by machine in insertion technique by Maj Britt Salander/company Blå Kusten. Blazon: "On swallowtailed yellow cloth the provincial badge of the former Kristianstad County; an erazed red head of a griffin with a blue crown with five plumes - red, white, red, white and red (a legacy from the then North Scanian Regiment, P 6). Yellow fringe".

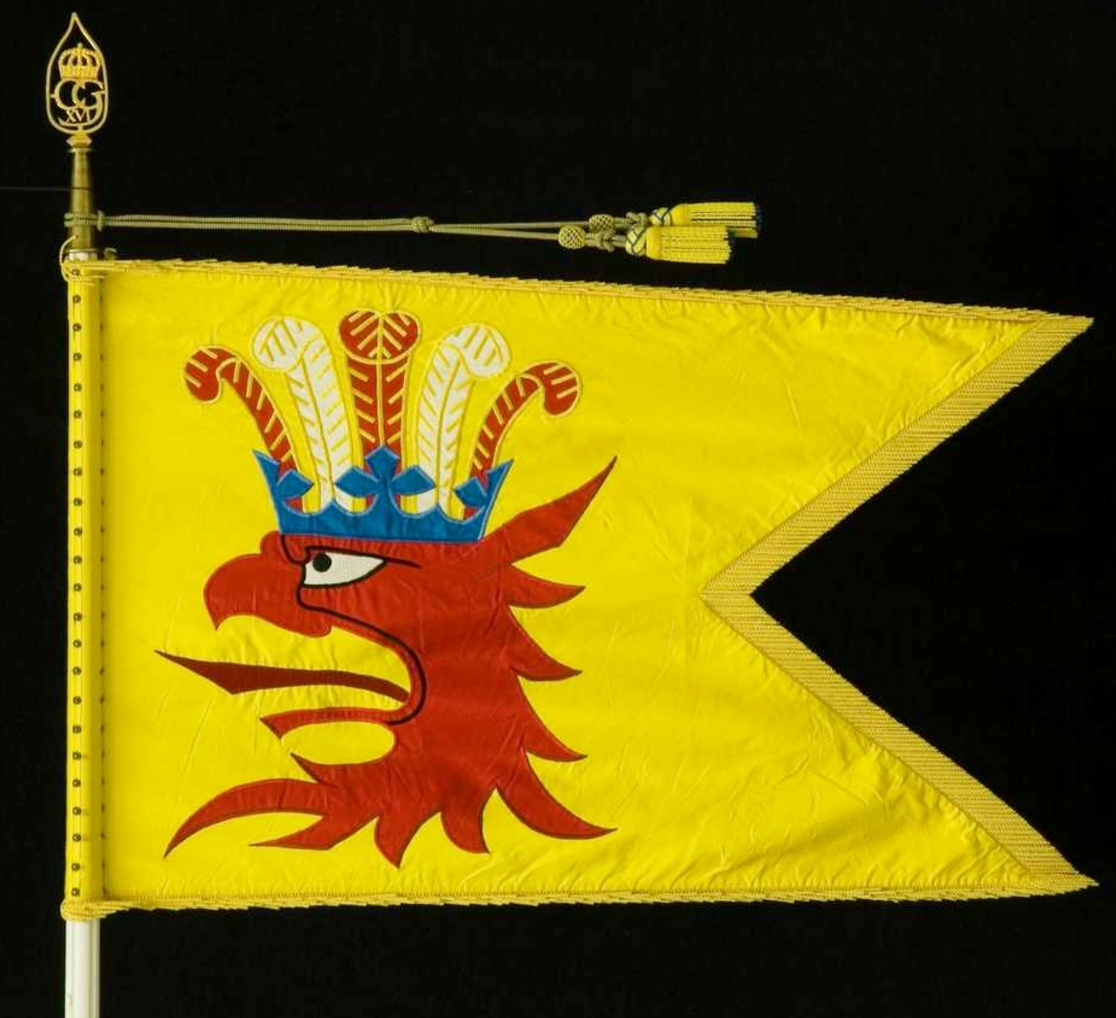
Guidon

=== Medals ===
In 1994, the Skånska dragonregementets (P 2) minnesmedalj) ("Scanian Dragoon Regiment (P 2) Commemorative Medal") in silver and bronze (SkåndragregSMM/BMM) of the 8th size was established. The medal ribbon is of yellow moiré with black edges and two black stripes on the middle.

In 2000, the Skånska dragonregementets (P 2) minnesmedalj) ("Scanian Dragoon Regiment (P 2) Commemorative Medal") in silver and bronze (SkåndragSMM) was established. The medal is oval in shape. The medal ribbon is of blue moiré with broad black edges and a black stripe on the middle followed on both sides by a broader yellow stripe. A crowned SD in silver/bronze is attached to the ribbon.

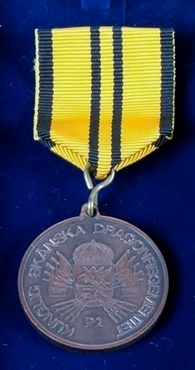
The 1994 commemorative medal

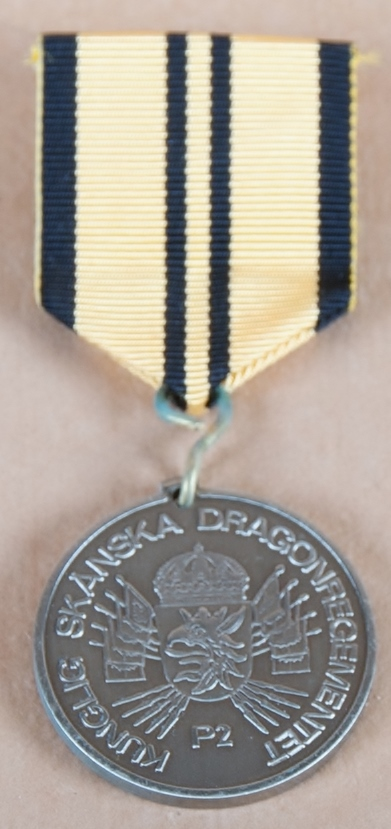
The 1994 commemorative medal

Ribbon bar of the 1994 commemorative medal

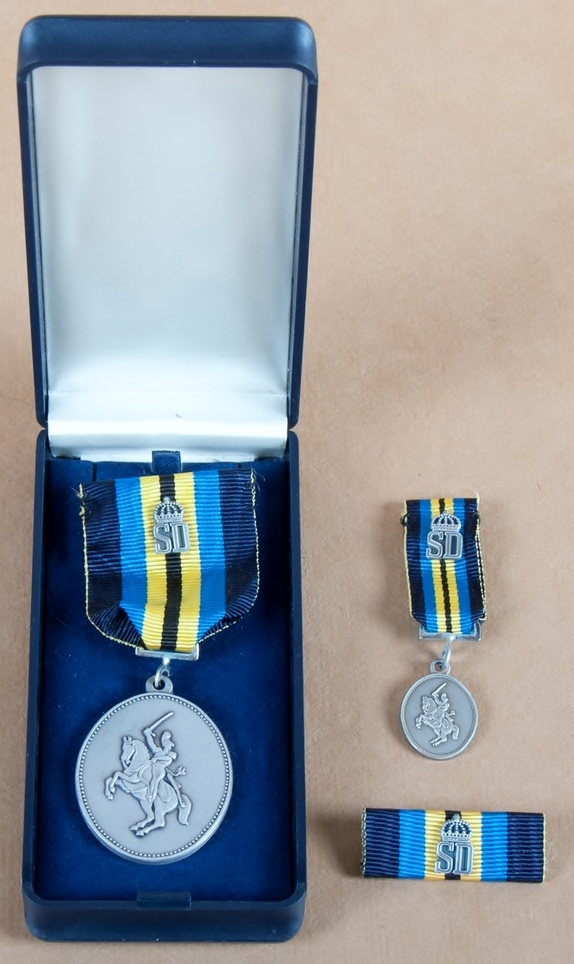
The 2000 commemorative medal

Ribbon bar of the 2000 commemorative medal

== Commanding officers ==
Commanding officers between 1941 and 1997:

- 1942–1949: Anders Nordström
- 1949–1952: Arvid Eriksson
- 1952–1957: Stig af Klercker
- 1957–1967: Carl Erik Wilhelm Lorichs
- 1967–1972: Nils Isaksson
- 1972–1980: Björn Zickerman
- 1980–1981: Hodder Stjernswärd
- 1981–1986: Hans Nilsson
- 1986–1990: Stig Arnold Edgren
- 1990–1992: Jan Gunnar Bergsström
- 1992–1994: Mats Göran Hansson
- 1994–1998: Jan Gunnar Bergström
- 1998–2000: Kjell Åke Plantin

== Names, designations and locations ==
| Name | Translation | From | | To |
|---|---|---|---|---|
| Kungl Skånska pansarregementet | Royal Scanian Armoured Regiment | 1942-10-01 | – | 1963-03-31 |
| Kungl Skånska dragonregementet | Royal Scanian Dragoon Regiment | 1963-04-01 | – | 1974-12-31 |
| Skånska dragonregementet | Scanian Dragoon Regiment | 1975-01-01 | – | 1994-06-30 |
| Norra skånska dragonregementet | North Scanian Dragoon Regiment | 1994-07-01 | – | 1997-12-31 |
| Skånska dragonregementet | Scanian Dragoon Regiment | 1998-01-01 | – | 2000-06-30 |
| Avvecklingsorganisation | Decommissioning Organisation | 2000-07-01 | – | 2001-06-30 |
| Designation | | From | | To |
| P 2 | | 1942-10-01 | – | 1994-06-30 |
| P 2/Fo 14 | | 1994-07-01 | – | 2000-06-30 |
| Location | | From | | To |
| Helsingborg Garrison | | 1942-10-01 | – | 1947-09-30 |
| Hässleholm Garrison | | 1947-10-01 | – | 2001-06-30 |

== See also ==
- List of Swedish armoured regiments
