= Eraser =

Stationery item used for erasing marks on paper

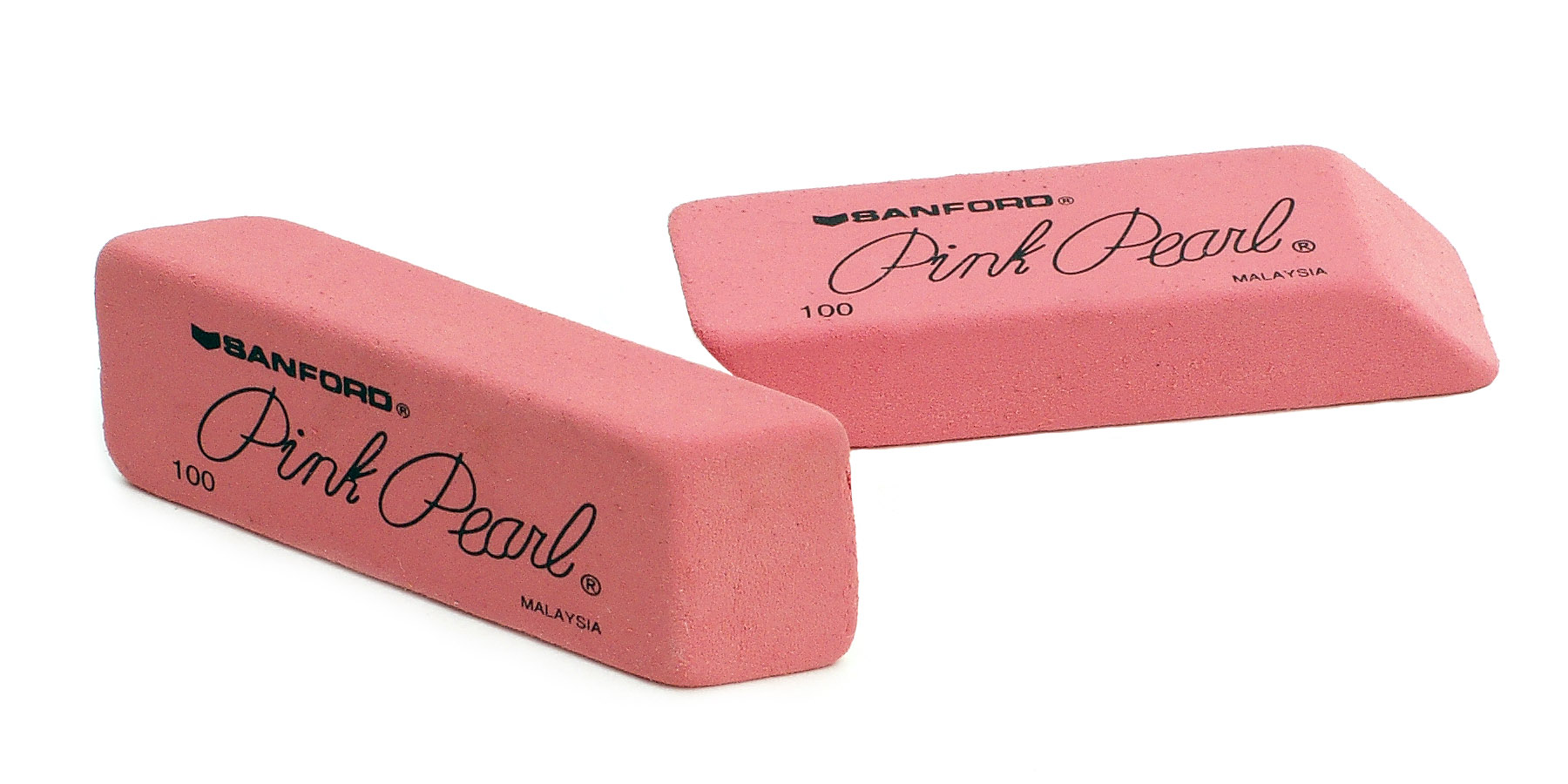
Pink erasers

Using an eraser

An eraser (also known as a rubber in some Commonwealth countries, including South Africa from which the material first used got its name) is an article of stationery that is used for removing marks from paper or skin (e.g. parchment or vellum). Erasers have a rubbery consistency and come in a variety of shapes, sizes, and colors. Some pencils have an eraser on one end. Less expensive erasers are made from synthetic rubber and synthetic soy-based gum, but more expensive or specialized erasers are made from vinyl, plastic, or gum-like materials.

At first, erasers were invented to erase mistakes made with a pencil; later, more abrasive ink erasers were introduced. The term is also used for things that remove marks from chalkboards and whiteboards.

== History ==
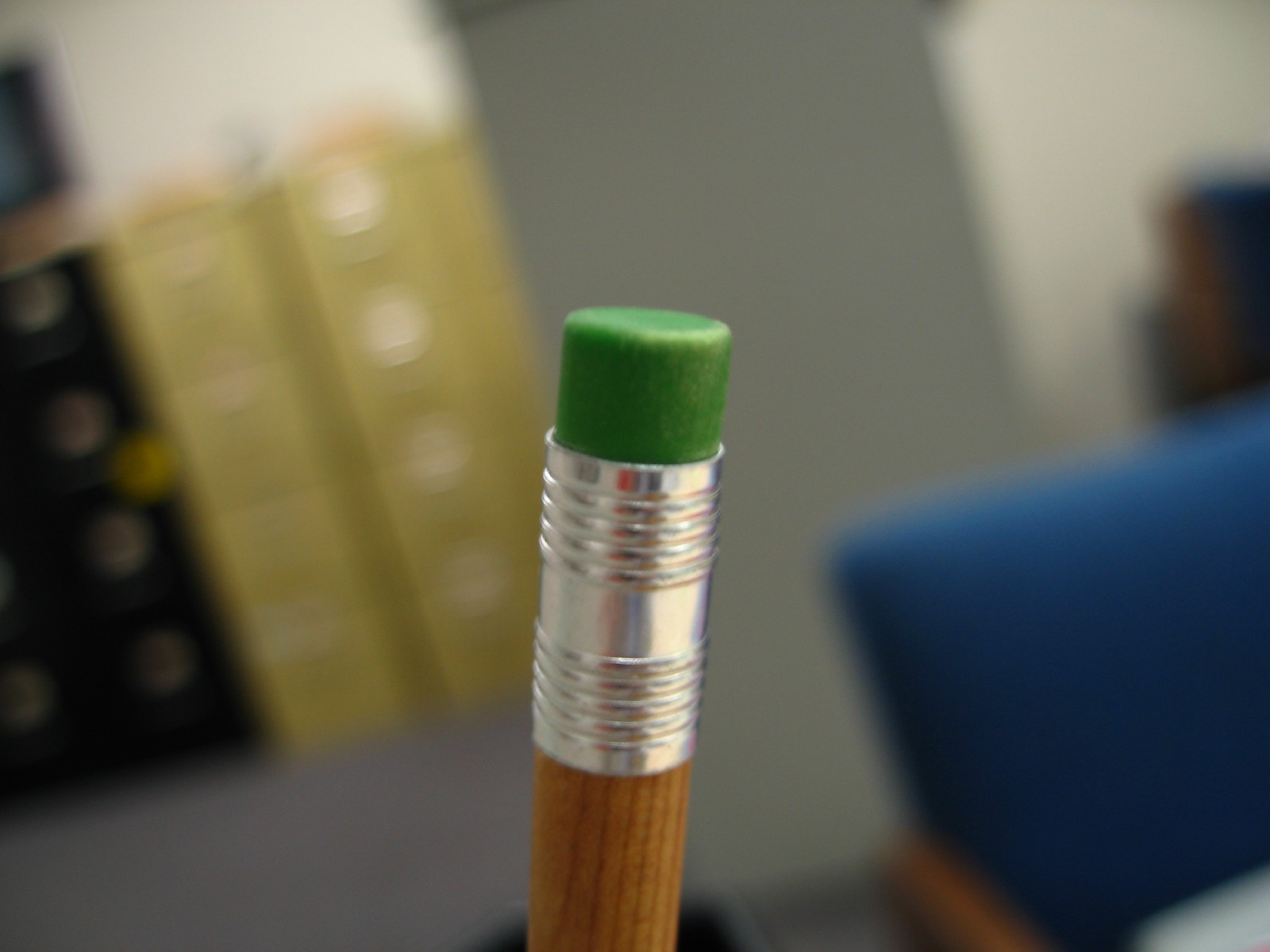
A pencil eraser

Before rubber erasers used today, tablets of wax were used to erase lead or charcoal marks from paper. Bits of rough stone such as sandstone or pumice were used to remove small errors from parchment or papyrus documents written in ink. Crustless bread was used; a Meiji period (1868–1912) Tokyo student said: "Bread erasers were used in place of rubber erasers, and so they would give them to us with no restriction on amount. So we thought nothing of taking these and eating a firm part to at least slightly satisfy our hunger."

In 1770, the English optician and scientific instrument maker Edward Nairne reportedly developed the first widely marketed rubber eraser for an inventions competition. Until that time the material was known as gum elastic or by its French name "caoutchouc" borrowed from Quechua. Nairne sold natural rubber erasers for the high price of three shillings per half-inch cube. According to Nairne, he inadvertently picked up a piece of rubber instead of breadcrumbs, discovered rubber's erasing properties, and began selling rubber erasers. The invention was described by Joseph Priestley on April 15, 1770, in a footnote: "I have seen a substance excellently adapted to the purpose of wiping from paper the mark of black-lead-pencil. ... It is sold by Mr. Nairne, Mathematical Instrument-Maker, opposite the Royal-Exchange." In 1770 the word "rubber" was in general use for any object used for rubbing; the word became attached to the new material sometime between 1770 and 1778.

However, raw rubber was perishable. In 1839 Charles Goodyear discovered the process of vulcanization, a method that would cure rubber, making it durable. Rubber erasers became common with the advent of vulcanization. On March 30, 1858, Hymen Lipman of Philadelphia, United States, received the first patent for attaching an eraser to the end of a pencil. It was later invalidated because it was determined to be simply a composite of two devices rather than an entirely new product. Erasers may be free-standing blocks (block and wedge eraser), or conical caps that can slip onto the end of a pencil (cap eraser). A barrel or click eraser is a device shaped like a pencil, but instead of being filled with pencil lead, its barrel contains a retractable cylinder of eraser material (most commonly soft vinyl). Many, but not all, wooden pencils are made with attached erasers. Novelty erasers made in shapes intended to be amusing are often made of hard vinyl, which tends to smear heavy markings when used as an eraser.

== Types ==
=== Pencil or cap erasers ===
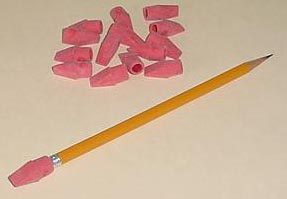
Cap erasers

Originally made from natural rubber, but now usually from cheaper styrene-butadiene rubber, this type contains mineral fillers and an abrasive, such as pumice, with a plasticizer such as vegetable oil. They are relatively hard (in order to remain attached to the pencil) and frequently colored pink. They can also be permanently attached to the end of a pencil with a ferrule.

=== Artist's gum eraser ===
The stylized word "Art gum" was first used in 1903 and trademarked in the United States in 1907. That type of eraser was originally made from oils such as corn oil vulcanized with sulfur dichloride although it may now be made from natural or synthetic rubber or vinyl compounds. It is very soft yet retains its shape and is not mechanically plastic, but crumbles as it is used. It is especially suited to cleaning large areas without damaging the paper. However, they are so soft as to be imprecise in use. The removed graphite is carried away in the crumbles, leaving the eraser clean, but resulting in a lot of eraser residue. This residue must then be brushed away with care, as the eraser particles are coated with the graphite and can make new marks. Art gum erasers are traditionally tan or brown, but some are blue.

=== Vinyl erasers ===
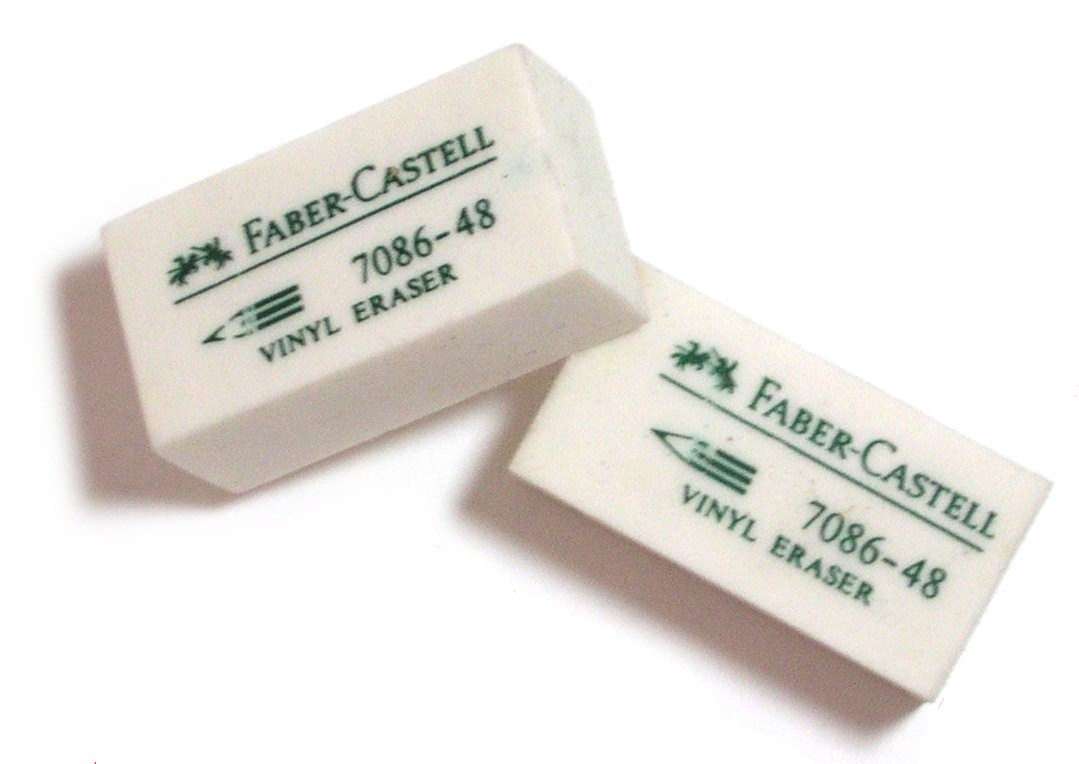
Vinyl erasers

High-quality plasticized vinyl or other "plastic" erasers, originally trademarked Mylar in the mid-20th century, are softer, non-abrasive, and erase more cleanly than standard rubber erasers. This is because the removed graphite does not remain on the eraser as much as rubber erasers, but is instead absorbed into the discarded vinyl scraps. Being softer and non-abrasive, they are less likely to damage canvas or paper. Engineers favor this type of eraser for work on technical drawings due to their gentleness on paper with less smearing to surrounding areas. They often come in white and can be found in a variety of shapes. More recently, very low-cost erasers are manufactured from highly plasticized vinyl compounds and made in decorative shapes.

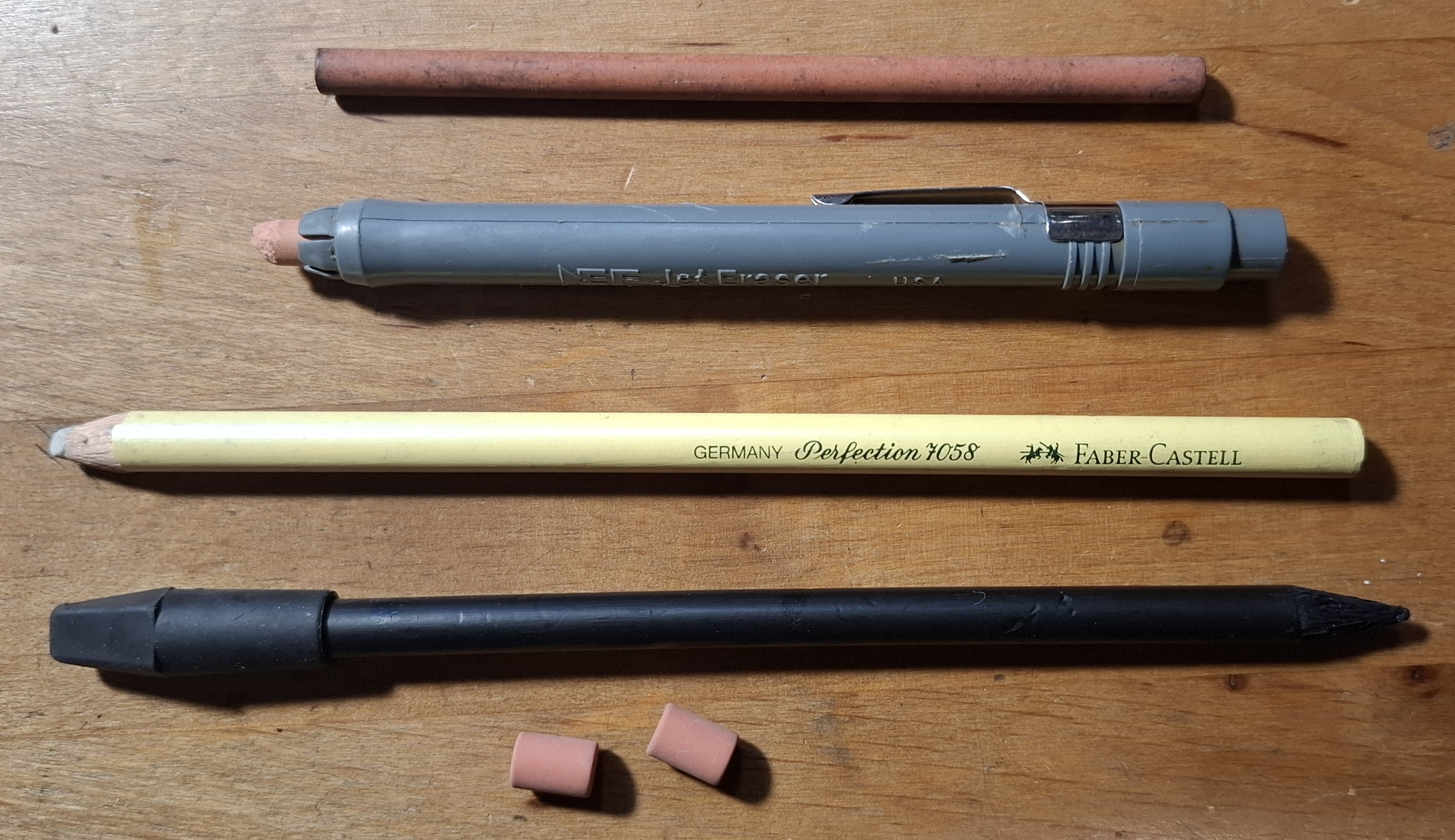
"Jet Eraser" with refill, eraser pen

=== Elastomer erasers ===
In these types, a thermoplastic elastomer combines a styrene resin elastomer and an olefin resin. These erasers have better erasability for erasing pencil marks compared to conventional vinyl erasers. Elastomers can be formed into thin cylindrical or other shapes to be used as extendable erasers.

=== Kneaded erasers ===
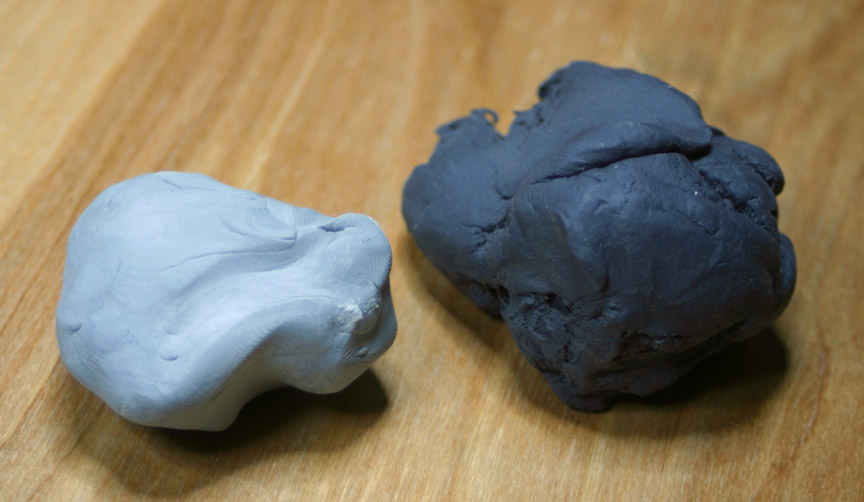
Two kneaded erasers. A new eraser is on the left, and an older eraser on the right. The older eraser is darker due to the graphite and charcoal dust that has become incorporated into it.

Kneaded erasers (called putty rubbers outside the United States) have a plastic consistency and are common to most artists' standard toolkit. They can be pulled into a point for erasing small areas and tight detail erasing, molded into a textured surface and used as a reverse stamp to give texture, or used in a "blotting" manner to lighten lines or shading without completely erasing them. They gradually lose their efficacy and resilience as they become infused with particles picked up from erasing and from their environment. They are not suited to erase large areas because of their tendency to deform under vigorous erasing.

=== Poster putty ===
Commonly sold in retail outlets with school supplies and home improvement products, this soft, malleable putty appears in many colors and under numerous brand names. Intended to adhere posters and prints to walls without damaging the underlying wall surface, poster putty works much the same as traditional kneaded erasers, but with a greater tack and in some circumstances, lifting strength. Poster putty does not erase so much as lighten by directly pulling particles of graphite, charcoal or pastel from a drawing. In this regard, poster putty does not smudge or damage work in the process. Repeatedly touching the putty to a drawing pulls ever more medium free, gradually lightening the work in a controlled fashion. Poster putty can be shaped into fine points or knife edges, making it ideal for detailed or small areas of work. It can be rolled across a surface to create visual textures. Poster putty loses its efficacy with use, becoming less tacky as the material grows polluted with debris and oils from the user's skin.

=== Electric erasers ===
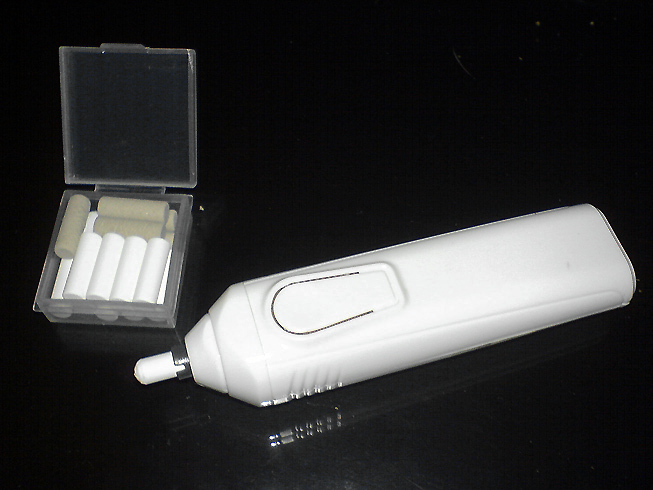
An electric eraser tool with replacement eraser heads

The electric eraser was invented in 1932 by Albert J. Dremel of Racine, Wisconsin, United States. It used a replaceable cylinder of eraser material held by a chuck driven on the axis of a motor. The speed of rotation allowed less pressure to be used, which minimized paper damage. Originally standard pencil-eraser rubber was used, later replaced by higher-performance vinyl. Dremel went on to develop an entire line of hand-held rotary power tools.

=== Fiberglass erasers ===
A fiberglass eraser, a bundle of very fine glass fibers, can be used for erasing and other tasks requiring abrasion. Typically the eraser is a pen-shaped device with a replaceable insert with glass fibers, which wear down in use. The fibers are very hard; in addition to removing pencil and pen markings, such erasers are used for cleaning traces on electronic circuit boards to facilitate soldering, removing rust, and many other applications. As an example of an unusual use, a fiberglass eraser was used for preparing a Pterosaur fossil embedded in a very hard and massive limestone. Because fiberglass erasers shed fiberglass dust when used, care must be taken during and after use to avoid accidental contamination with this abrasive dust in sensitive areas of the body, especially in the eyes.

=== Other ===
Felt chalkboard erasers or blackboard dusters are used to erase chalk markings on a chalkboard. Chalk writing leaves light-colored particles weakly adhering to a dark surface (e.g., white on black, or yellow on green); it can be rubbed off with a soft material, such as a rag. Erasers for chalkboards are made, with a block of plastic or wood, much larger than an eraser for pen or pencil, with a layer of felt on one side. The block is held in the hand and the felt rubbed against the writing, which it easily wipes off. Chalk dust is released, some of which sticks to the eraser until it is cleaned, usually by hitting it against a hard surface.

Various types of eraser, depending upon the board and the type of ink used, are used to erase a whiteboard.

Dedicated erasers that are supplied with some ballpens and permanent markers are intended only to erase the ink of the writing instrument they are made for; sometimes this is done by making the ink bond more strongly to the material of an eraser than the surface it was applied to.

Co-inventor of the laser Arthur Leonard Schawlow created a "laser eraser" for typewritten material. This used a laser to vaporize the ink of the typo, leaving the paper beneath unharmed. Although Schawlow received a patent for the invention, it was never produced commercially.

== See also ==
- Ink eraser
- Chalkboard eraser
- Kneaded eraser
