= Göta Logistic Regiment =

Military unit in Sweden

- Göta trängregemente
- Active: 1891–present
- Country: Sweden
- Allegiance: Swedish Armed Forces
- Branch: Swedish Army
- Type: Service Troops
- Size: Regiment
- Part of: Army Staff (Note: The unit has been subordinate to the following units: 5th Military District (1891–1892); 3rd Army Division (1893–1901); III Army Division (1902–1927); Western Army Division (1928–1936); III Army Division (1937–1942); III.milo (1942–1966); Milo V (1966–1993); Milo S (1993–2000); OPIL (2000–2005); SAFHQ (2005–2007); Chief of Defence Logistics (2007–2019); Army Staff (2019–present))
- Garrison/HQ: Skövde
- Motto(s): Logistik – vårt ansvar (Note: Established in 2000 by then regimental commander of Göta Logistic Regiment (T 2), colonel Jan Persson.) ("Logistics - our responsibility"); Alltid i insats ("Always in action")
- Colors: Blue and white
- March: "Tellusmarsch" (Damberg) (Note: The march was established in 1953 by Army Order 33/1953.)

Commanders
- Current commander: COL Markus Gannerud

Insignia
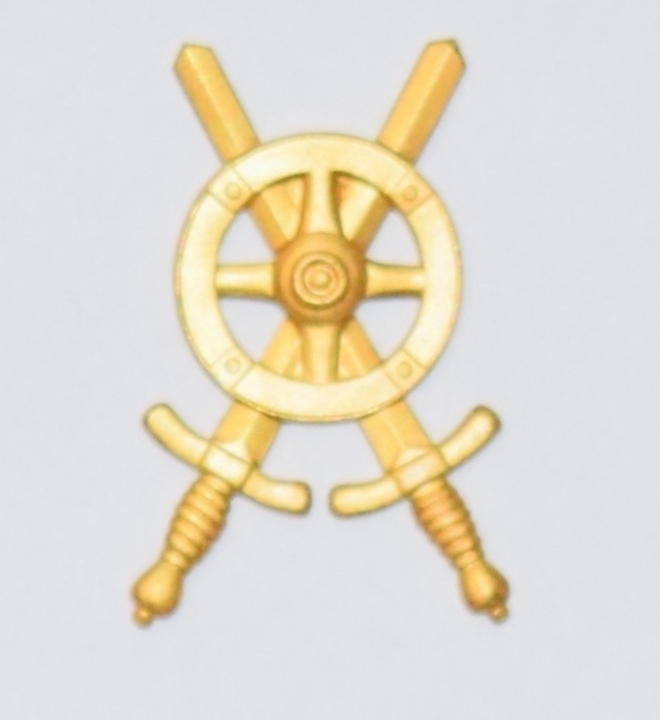
- Branch insignia

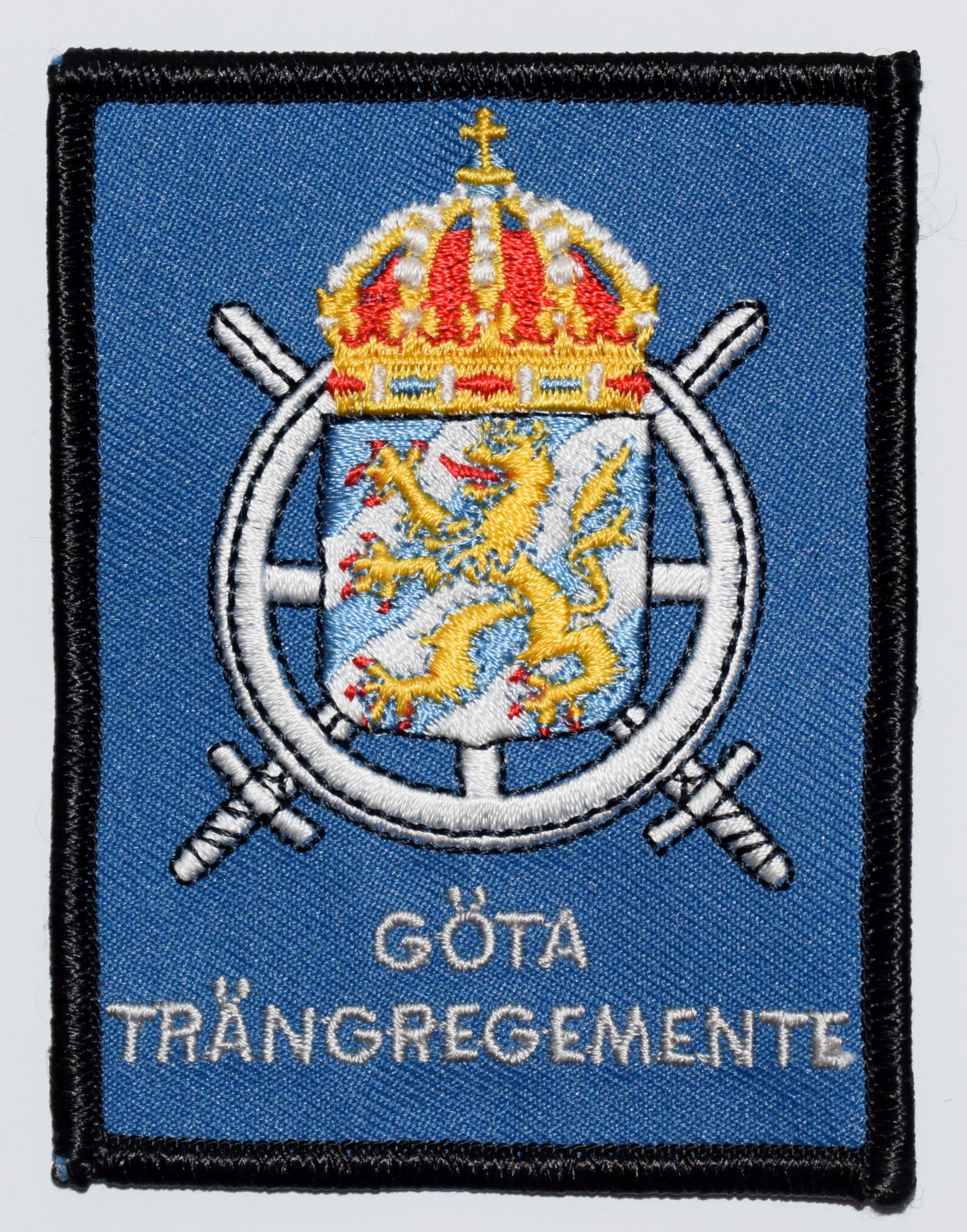
- Shoulder sleeve insignia (1980s-1994)

The Göta Logistic Regiment (Swedish: Göta trängregemente, T 2), is the only logistic regiment in the Swedish Armed Forces. Its new organisation was laid down in 2000, when the regiment became the only logistic regiment in Sweden. The regiment is located in Skövde.

== History ==
The regiment has its origins in the Logistic Battalion (Trängbataljonen), the first logistic unit that was raised in Stockholm in 1885. In 1891, the battalion was divided into two parts, which formed the Svea Logistic Battalion (T 1) and the Göta Logistic Battalion (T 2). Göta Logistic Battalion was relocated to Karlsborg Fortress in 1892, and was placed in the eastern part alongside artillerymen and engineers. With the introduction of the 1901 Army Order, the battalion received the name 1st Göta Logistic Corps (T 2), and at the same time planning began to move from Karlsborg to a new barracks establishment in either Alingsås, Falköping or Skövde. The decision was made in 1902 to move to Skövde. The corps changed its name to Göta Logistic Corps (T 2) in 1904 and was relocated to Norrmalm in Skövde in 1905.

Through the Defence Act of 1948, the Riksdag decided to disband the Ordnance Troops (Tygtrupperna) and the Quartermaster Troops (Intendenturtrupperna) as separate service branches. The constituent units were amalgamated into the Swedish Army Service Troops between 1948 and 1951. On 1 January 1949, the 2nd Ordnance Company (Andra tygkompaniet, Tyg 2) was added and on 1 January 1951, the 2nd Quartermaster Company (Andra intendenturkompaniet, Int 2) was added. Through that reorganization, the corps was elevated from 1 July 1949 to a regiment and was assigned the name Göta Logistic Regiment (T 2). In connection with the OLLI reform which was carried out in the Swedish Armed Forces between 1973 and 1975, Skaraborg Regiment (P 4) was amalgamated with Skaraborg Defence District (Skaraborgs försvarsområde, Fo 35) and formed in 1974 the defence district regiment (försvarsområdesregemente) P 4/Fo 35. This led to Göta Logistic Regiment which was part of Skaraborg Defence District became a B unit (training regiment), and its mobilization and materiel responsibility was transferred to Skaraborg Regiment, which became an A unit (defence district regiment).

Prior to King in Council's bill 1974:135, the Swedish Armed Forces Peace Organization Investigation (Försvarets fredsorganisationsutredning, FFU) had submitted a partial report in December 1972, regarding certain changes to the army's peace organization. Among other things, it proposed a disbandment of the Göta Logistic Regiment (T 2), and that the Swedish Army School of Logistics (Arméns underhållsskola, US) should be relocated to Hässleholm. In October 1973, the Chief of the Army Lieutenant General Carl Eric Almgren handed over his peace organization plan for the army, where, among other things, the Göta Logistic Regiment and the Army School of Logistics were proposed to be co-located with Skaraborg Regiment. In Bill 1974:135, which was published on 25 October 1974, the FFU came to share the Chief of the Army's proposal of co-locating the Göta Logistic Regiment with Skaraborg Regiment. However, no co-location ever became real, but prior to the Defence Act of 1982, the Supreme Commander of the Swedish Armed Forces General Lennart Ljung proposed co-locating Göta Logistic Regiment with Skaraborg Regiment. Göta Logistic Regiment would then take over the barracks establishment that the Life Regiment Hussars were proposed to leave, to be relocated to Karlsborg. The government agreed with the proposal and in Bill 1981/82:102 it was proposed that Göta Logistic Regiment, Army School of Logistics and the Swedish Army Service Troops Officers College (Trängtruppernas officershögskola, TrängOHS) be co-located according to the Supreme Commander's proposal no later than 1987 within the garrison with Skaraborg Regiment, whereby part of Skaraborg Regiment's and the entire Life Regiment Hussars' barracks establishment would be used. Thus, Göta Logistic Regiment's barracks establishment on Högskolevägen (formerly Mariestadsvägen and Rekrytvägen) could be closed down. On 1 July 1984, the Göta Logistic Regiment moved into the cavalry barracks at Heden in Skövde.

Through the Defence Act of 1992, all training regiments that did not raise war units the size of a regiment, should not be called regiments. This was because the government considered that the basic organization should reflect the war organization. In connection with this, the regiment was reduced to a corps on 1 July 1994 and regained its old name Göta Logistic Corps (T 2). Prior to the Defence Act of 2000, it was clear that one of the two corps, Göta Logistic Corps (T 2) and Norrland Logistic Corps (T 3), would be disbanded. The government considered that the corps in Skövde had the best conditions for developing into a tri-service main unit for maintenance service. This was partly due to the fact that the government also proposed a disbandment of Västernorrland Regiment (I 21) and the Ångermanland Brigade (Ångermanlandsbrigaden, NB 21), which would then leave Norrland Logistic Corps alone within the Sollefteå Garrison. For the benefit of Göta Logistic Corps, the government considered the proximity within the garrison to mechanized units, the military district workshop, the mechanics' school and proximity to the Medical Center of the Swedish Armed Forces and a number of larger hospitals. However, the government considered that there should be maintenance training with winter training in northern Sweden, which would then be located in Östersund and be co-located with the Swedish Army Technical School (Arméns tekniska skola, ATS) and the Motor School (Motorskolan, MS).

Through the change that the Riksdag decided on, Norrland Logistic Corps (T 3) to be disbanded on 30 June 2000 as an independent unit, and from 1 July 2000 be amalgamated into a training battalion under the name Norrland Logistic Battalion (Trängbat/I 5) in Jämtland Ranger Regiment (I 5). At the same time, Göta Logistic Corps regained regimental status, and from 1 July 2000 the name Göta Logistic Regiment (T 2) was received. Through the Defence Act of 2004, the Riksdag decided, among other things, that Jämtland Ranger Regiment and Norrland Logistic Battalion would be disbanded on 31 December 2004. Based on that decision, Göta Logistic Regiment became from 1 January 2005 the only remaining logistic unit within the Swedish Army Service Troops. On 1 January 2007, the regiment was renamed the Logistic Regiment to mark that the unit became a tri-service unit with tasks to support the navy and the air force in addition to the army. On 28 January 2019, the Logistic Regiment returned to the army after the Chief of the Swedish Armed Forces Logistics (FMLOG), Brigadier General Michael Nilsson, handed over the Logistic Regiment to the Chief of Army, Major General Karl Engelbrektson at a ceremony at the Logistic Regiment in Skövde.

On 26 February 2021, the Swedish Armed Forces presented its budget documentation for 2022, in which the Swedish Armed Forces proposed, among other things, that the Logistic Regiment (TrängR) should change its name to Göta Logistic Regiment (T 2). This is in light of the fact that the regiment has since 2019 switched from a tri-service regimental force to an army regiment. On 12 November 2021, the name Göta Logistic Regiment was adopted, which will be celebrated with a ceremony in connection with the Garrison Day in the spring of 2022 at the Skövde Garrison.

== Units ==
=== Current units ===
- 1st Logistics Battalion (1. logistikbataljonen, 1. logbat) has the task of supplying materiel such as fuel, ammunition, food, water and other equipment to the units of the Swedish Armed Forces. The battalion is in peace-time cadre-organized with a battalion staff and two war companies, the logistics company and the 1st Medical Reinforcement Company. After completing training in the 2nd Logistics Battalion, full-time soldiers are placed with these companies. The battalion consists mainly of continuously serving professional officers, civilians and soldiers. There are also periodically serving soldiers.
- 2nd Logistics Battalion (2. logistikbataljonen, 2. logbat) has the task of supplying materiel such as fuel, ammunition, food, water and other equipment to the units of the Swedish Armed Forces. The battalion is in peace-time cadre-organized with a battalion staff and two training companies, Karlsborg Company and Marieberg Company. At these companies, all recruits and soldiers are trained for the Logistic Regiment's operational units. The training encompasses basic military training, continued soldier training and combat occupation training in a variety of fields. The battalion consists of continuously serving professional officers and civilians as well as part-time serving reserve officers and soldiers.
- Medical Reinforcement Companies (Sjukvårdsförstärkningskompanier) are both part of the Swedish Armed Forces medical system and are a resource for the entire Swedish Armed Forces. They should be able to support other units with medical units and expertise. The companies are designed to perform in smaller units and support the other units of the Swedish Armed Forces on the battlefield with mainly surgery, medical evacuation and care capacity. Each platoon, section or squad can independently support other units.
- 1st Traffic and Movement Control Company (Första trafik och transportledningskompaniet) is a joint service resource that plans, directs, coordinates and monitors the Swedish Armed Forces' transports and special transports both nationally and internationally. For national and international transport, the company can also support with safety advice on dangerous goods. The 1st Traffic and Movement Control Company also support foreign military transport in Sweden.
- Swedish Armed Forces Logistics and Vehicle School (Försvarsmaktens logistik och motorskola, LogS) is a joint service school that develops skills from personnel from the entire Swedish Armed Forces. Here, vocational and combat occupational training courses are conducted in the areas of vehicle service, logistics management, supply of material, provisioning service, communication service and dangerous goods. The school also conducts the function-oriented part of the Officers Program (OP), the Specialist Officer Training (SOU) and the occupational position course of Logistics Management. There is also a development section at the school that has the task of developing operational/tactical logistics units. The work includes, among other things, proposing logistics equipment, conducting studies, developing publications and developing methods in the area of responsibility.

=== Previous units ===
- Swedish Army Vehicle School (Arméns motorskola, MotorS) was a joint army military school within the Swedish Army, operating in various forms from 1944 to 1991 and from 1999 to 2006. The school was originally part of Södermanland Regiment (P 10) in Strängnäs. From 1991 to 1998, the school was part of the Swedish Army Maintenance and Vehicle School (Arméns underhålls- och motorskola) in Skövde. From 1999 to 2005, the school was located in Östersund and was part of the Swedish Army Technical School (Arméns tekniska skola, ATS). From 2006 the school was located in Skövde and became part of the Logistic Regiment. From 2007, the school is part of the Swedish Armed Forces Logistics and Vehicle School (Försvarsmaktens logistik och motorskola, LogS).
- Göta Logistic Regiment's Company in Nora (Göta trängregementes kompani i Nora, T 2 N) was a detachment in Nora that was raised on 1 April 1945. Originally, the detachment consisted of a medical company, and in 1946 the detachment was expanded with a further company. In 1952, the detachment was disbanded and turned into a mobilization center, which operated until 1957. Since 4 May 1991, the 4th Company, also called Nora Company, is heir to the Göta Logistic Regiment's Company in Nora.

== Locations and training areas ==
When the unit was raised in 1891, the barracks were taken over from the Train Battalion (Trängbataljonen) in Marieberg, Stockholm. On 25 April 1892, the unit was relocated to Karlsborg, where it was located until 1 October 1905. However, on 26 September 1905, a ceremonial march towards Skövde had been made, which became the unit's next place of location. In Skövde, the unit moved into a newly erected barracks on Mariestadsvägen (since 1986 known as Högskolevägen). On 1 July 1984, the unit was relocated within Skövde, when it took over the cavalry barracks at Heden, in connection with the relocation of the Life Regiment Hussars to Karlsborg.

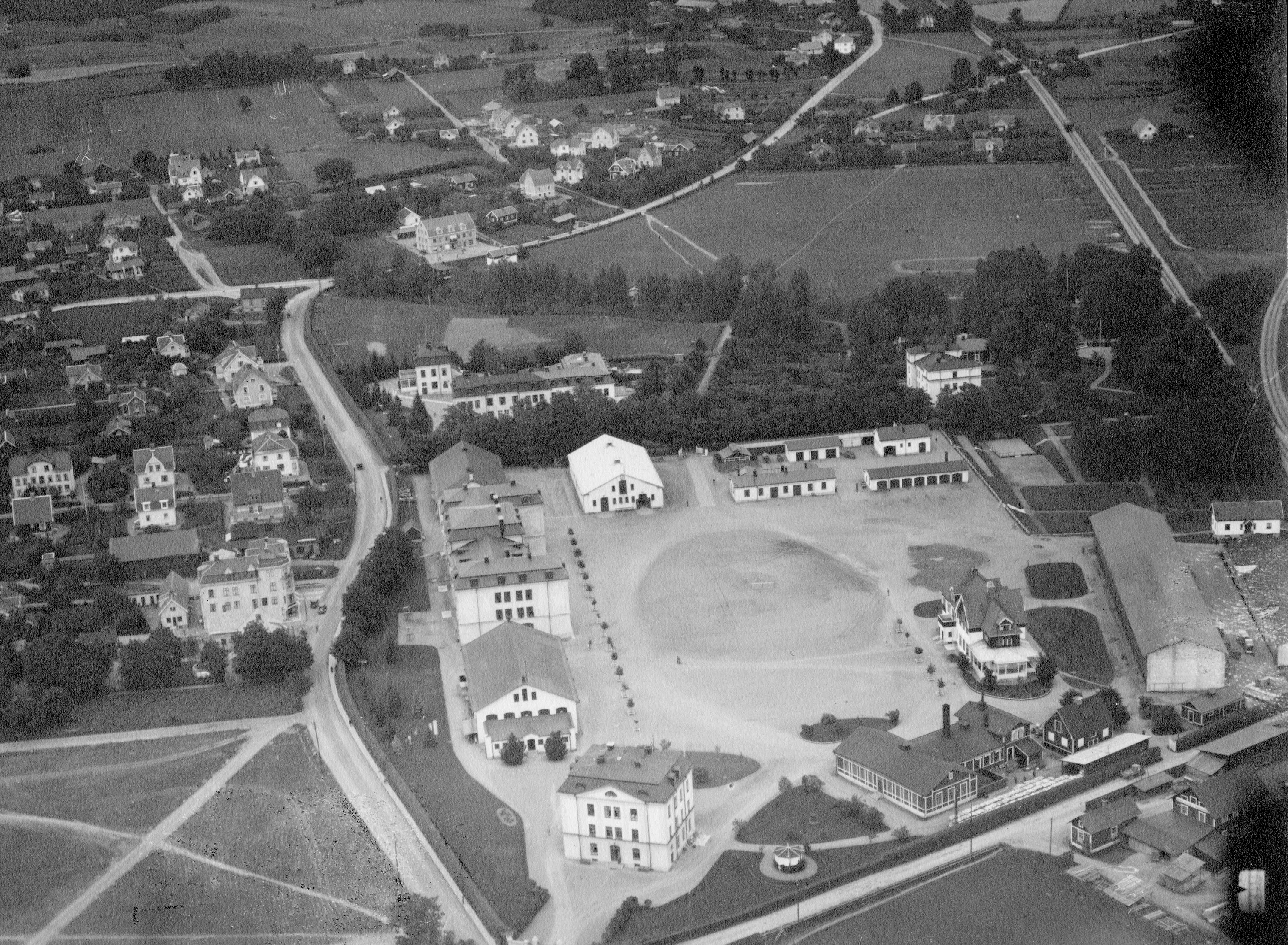
Aerial view of Göta Logistic Regiment's (T 2) former regimental area on Högskolevägen, Skövde

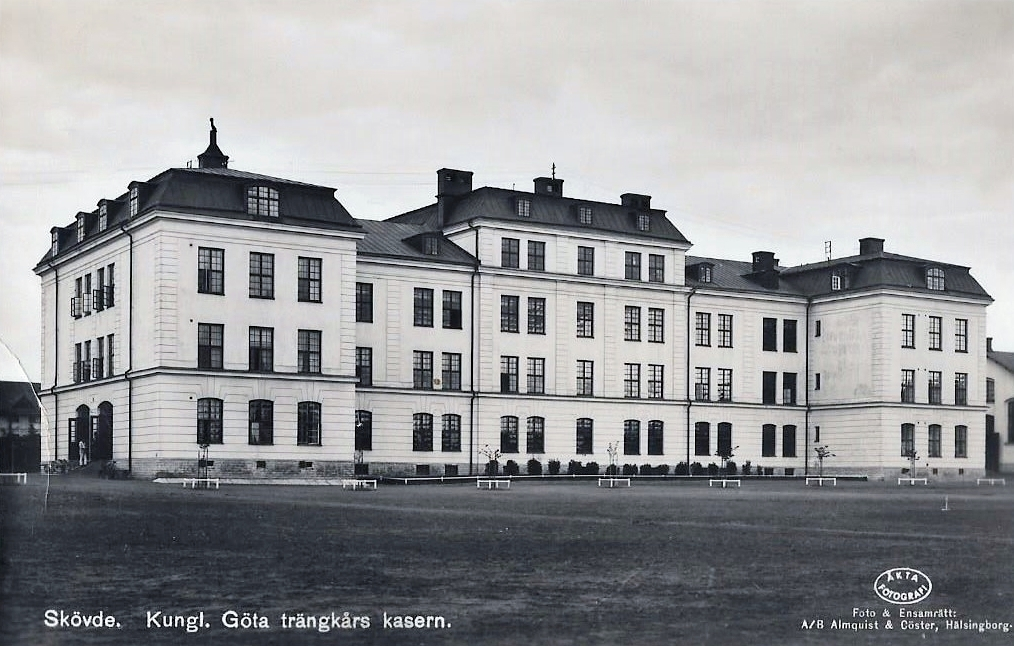
Logistic Barracks at Högskolevägen, Skövde

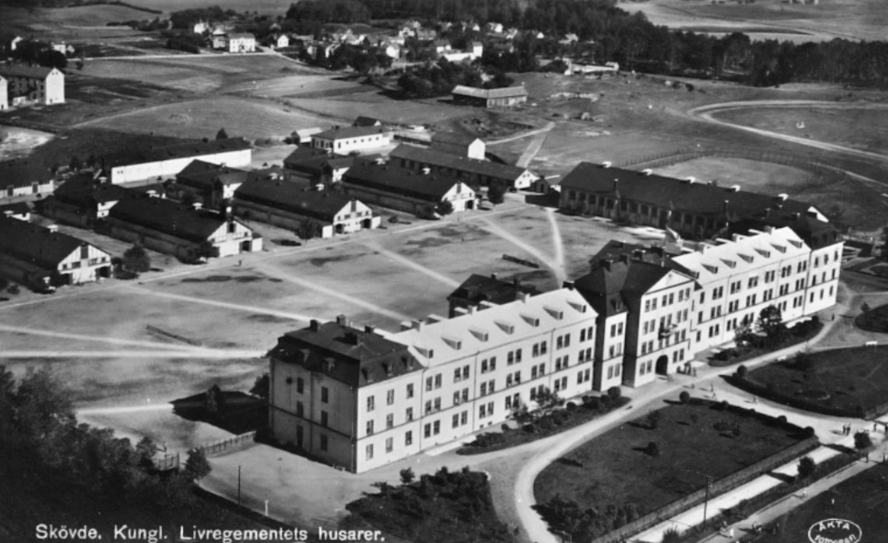
Cavalry Barracks at Heden, Skövde, the regiment's barracks since 1984

== Heraldry and traditions ==
=== Coat of arms ===
The coat of the arms of the Göta Logistic Regiment (T 2) 1977–1994, the Göta Logistic Corps (T 2) 1994–2000, the Göta Logistic Regiment (T 2) 2000–2007 and the Logistic Regiment (TrängR)/Göta Logistic Regiment (T 2) 2020–present. Blazon: "Azure, the regimental badge, three waves bendy-sinister argent, charged with a crowned lion rampant or, armed and langued gules. The shield surmounted a cart wheel of four spokes over two swords in saltire, argent". Another coat of arms was used between 2007 and 2020. Blazon: "Azure, a cart wheel of four spokes over two swords in saltire, argent. The shield surmounted an erect sword argent."

Coat of arms used until 2007 and 2020–present.

Coat of arms used 2007–2020.

=== Colours, standards and guidons ===
The Logistic Regiment presents one regimental colour and one traditional colour:

==== Colour of T 2 ====
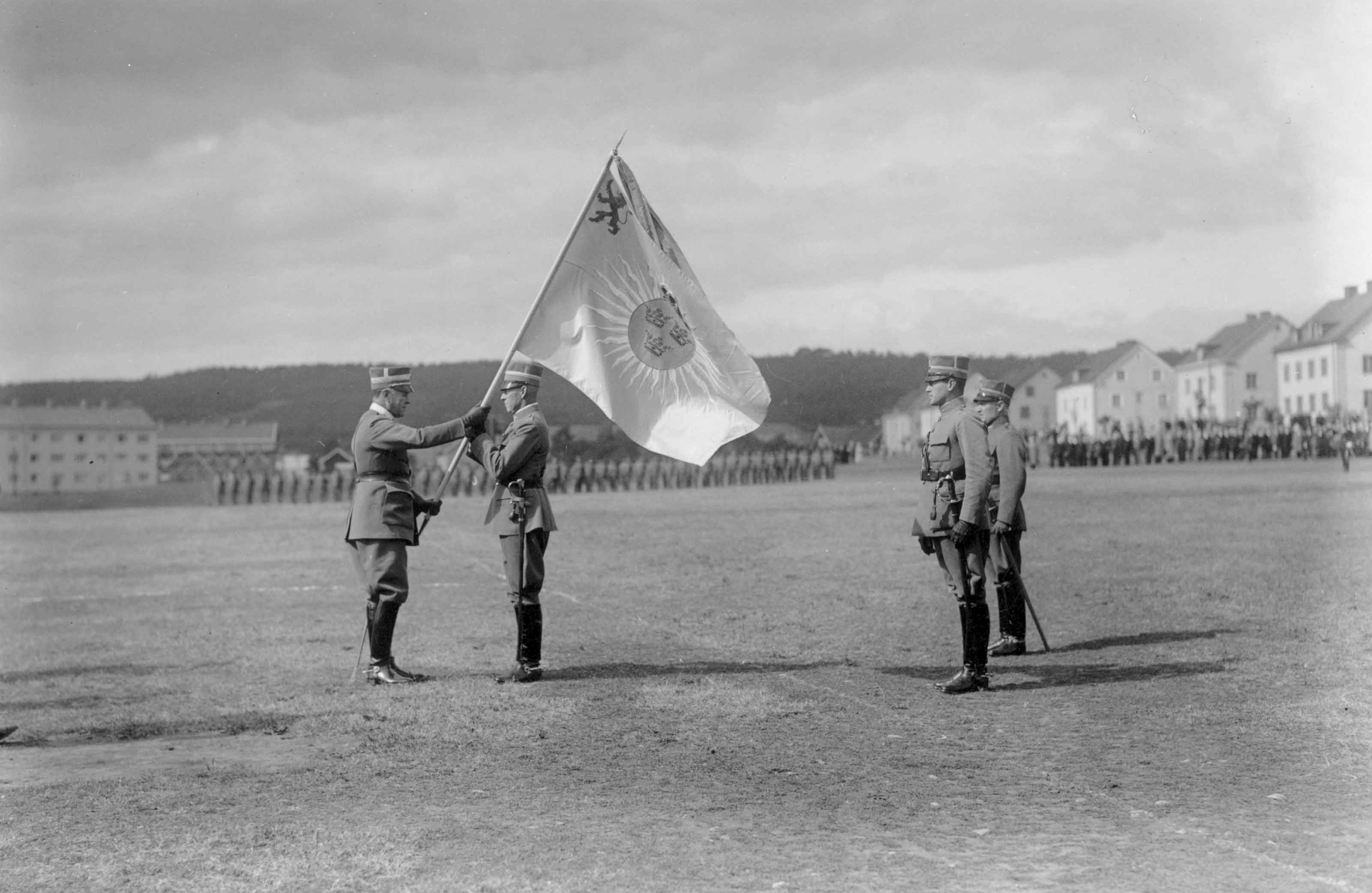
Major General Lennart Lilliehöök presenting the colour, 1 September 1935

The colour was presented to the then Royal Göta Logistic Corps (T 2) in Skövde by the commanding officer of the Western Army Division (Västra arméfördelningen), Major General Lennart Lilliehöök on 1 September 1935 at the 50-years anniversary of the Swedish Army Service Troops. The colour is drawn by Mrs Westberg and embroidered by hand in insertion technique by the company Licium. Blazon: "On light blue cloth in the middle, on a circular shield the Swedish lesser national coat of arms according to the law, the shield surrounded by white tongues and rays. In the first corner the badge of the regiment; a rampant yellow lion with an open crown, armed and langued red."

==== Former colour of T 1 ====
The colour was presented to the former Royal Svea Logistic Corps (T 1) in Linköping by the commanding officer of the Eastern Army Division (Östra arméfördelningen), lieutenant general Gösta Lilliehöök on 1 September 1935 at the 50-years anniversary of the Swedish Army Service Troops. It was used as regimental colour by T 1 until 1 June 1997. The colour is drawn by Mrs Westberg and embroidered by hand in insertion technique by the company Licium. Blazon: "On light blue cloth in the middle, on a circular shield the lesser coat of arms of Sweden according to the law, the shield surrounded by white tongues and rays. In the first corner the griffin segreant of the provincial badge of Östergötland; yellow, armed and langued red."

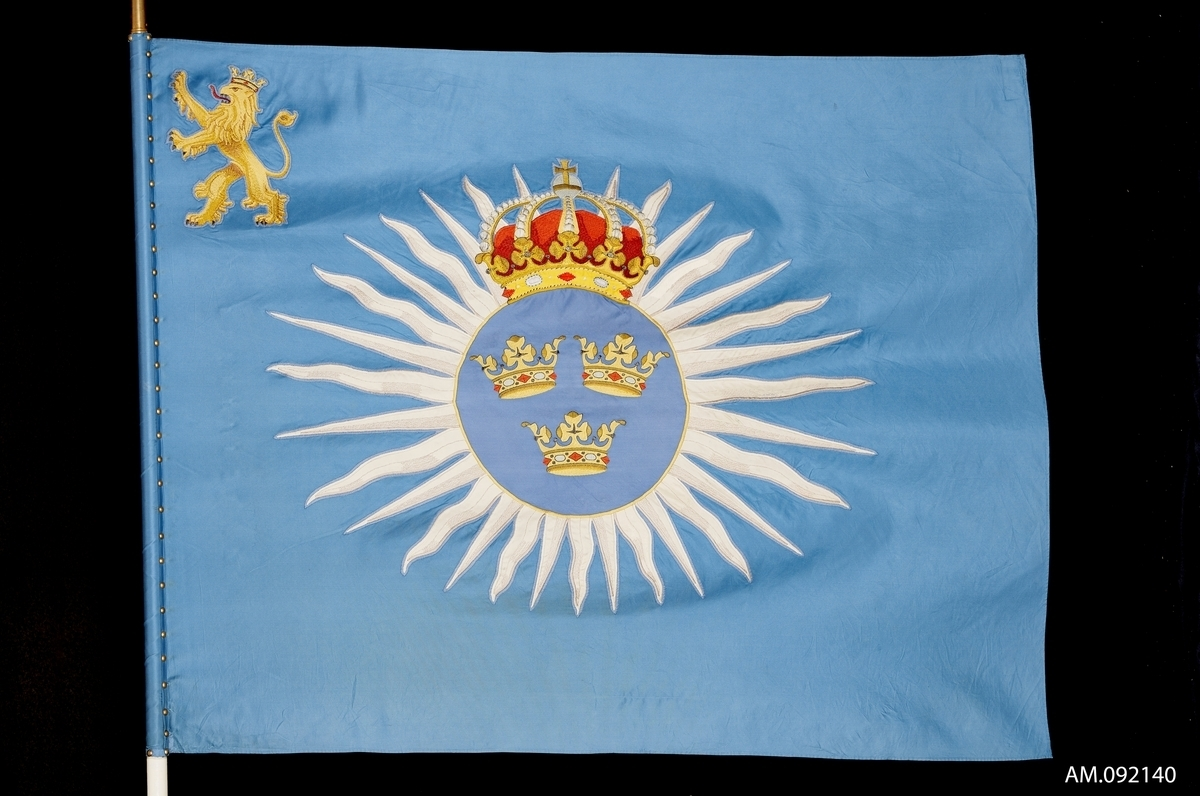
T 2 colour

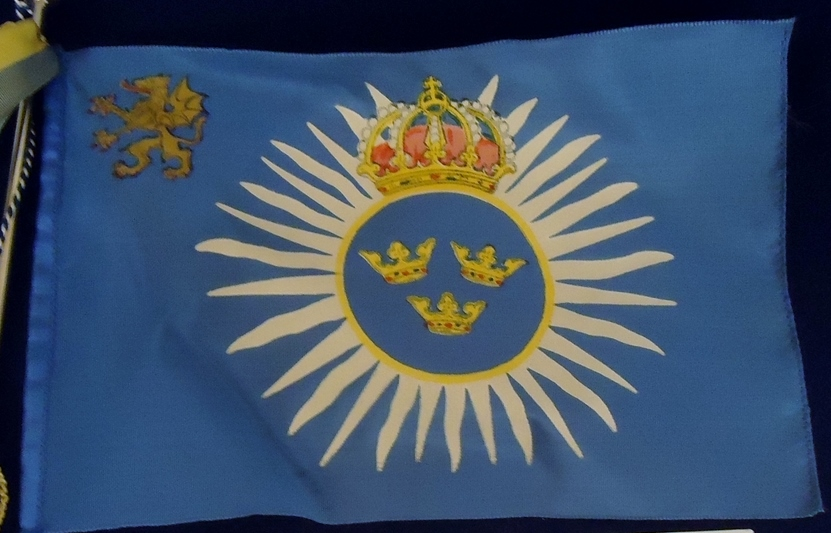
T 1 colour

== Commanding officers ==
Active battalion, corps and regimental commanders since 1891.

- 1891–1893: A O E Mattson
- 1893–1894: Ivar Virgin
- 1894–1908: Svante Falk
- 1908–1918: Eduard Kraak
- 1918–1924: Richard Teodor Berg
- 1924–1927: Karl Erik Erhardt
- 1928–1934: Gustaf Axel Smith
- 1934–1939: Arvid Johan Fredrik Holmberg
- 1939–1942: Gottfrid Björck
- 1942–1948: John Gustaf Thorgny Unge
- 1948–1952: Sten E:son Camitz
- 1952–1961: Bror Martin Sandberg
- 1961–1962: Nils Gösta Schyllander (acting)
- 1962–1964: Fritz Magnus Sommar Bruzelius
- 1964–1967: Bo Knut Erik Lüning
- 1967–1968: Kjell Nordström
- 1968–1979: Gunnar Wikland
- 1979–1986: Nils Yngve Ekman
- 1986–1987: Erik Rossander
- 1987–1993: Tord Björkman
- 1993–1998: Nils L G Smith
- 1998–2004: Jan H C Persson
- 2004–2007: Krister Edvardson
- 2007–2011: Mats Ström
- 2011–2015: Lennart Thomsen
- 2015–2019: Patric Hjorth
- 2019–2021: Per Nilsson
- 2021–2025: Elisabeth Skoglund
- 2025–20xx: Markus Gannerud

== Names, designations and locations ==
Note: The word träng ("train") as in trängregemente is translated to either "train", "service force"; "transport"; "baggage"; "supply vehicles" pl.; (Br) "army service corps", (US) "maintenance and supply troops", "transportation" (adj.), or "logistic".

| Name | Translation | From | | To |
|---|---|---|---|---|
| Kungl Göta trängbataljon | Royal Göta Service Battalion; Royal Göta Transportation Battalion | 1891-04-01 | – | 1901-12-31 |
| Kungl Första Göta trängkår | Royal 1st Göta Service Corps; Royal 1st Göta Transportation Corps | 1902-01-01 | – | 1904-12-07 |
| Kungl Göta trängkår | Royal Göta Service Troops | 1904-12-08 | – | 1949-06-30 |
| Kungl Göta trängregemente | Royal Göta Service Regiment; Royal Göta Transportation Regiment | 1949-07-01 | – | 1974-12-31 |
| Göta trängregemente | Göta Service Regiment; Göta Transportation Regiment | 1975-01-01 | – | 1994-06-30 |
| Göta trängkår | Göta Service Troops | 1994-07-01 | – | 2000-06-30 |
| Göta trängregemente | Göta Service Regiment; Göta Transportation Regiment | 2000-07-01 | – | 2006-12-31 |
| Trängregementet | Logistic Regiment | 2007-01-01 | – | 2021-11-11 |
| Göta trängregemente | Göta Logistic Regiment | 2021-11-12 | – | |
| Designation | | From | | To |
| T 2 | | 1891-04-01 | – | 2006-12-31 |
| TrängR | | 2007-01-01 | – | 2021-11-11 |
| T 2 | | 2021-11-12 | – | |
| Location | | From | | To |
| Stockholm Garrison | | 1891-04-01 | – | 1892-04-24 |
| Karlsborg Garrison | | 1892-04-25 | – | 1905-09-30 |
| Skövde Garrison | | 1905-10-01 | – | |

== See also ==
- List of Swedish logistic regiments
