= Chief of Defence Logistics (Sweden) =

Chief of Defence Logistics of the Swedish Armed Forces
- Försvarslogistikchefen
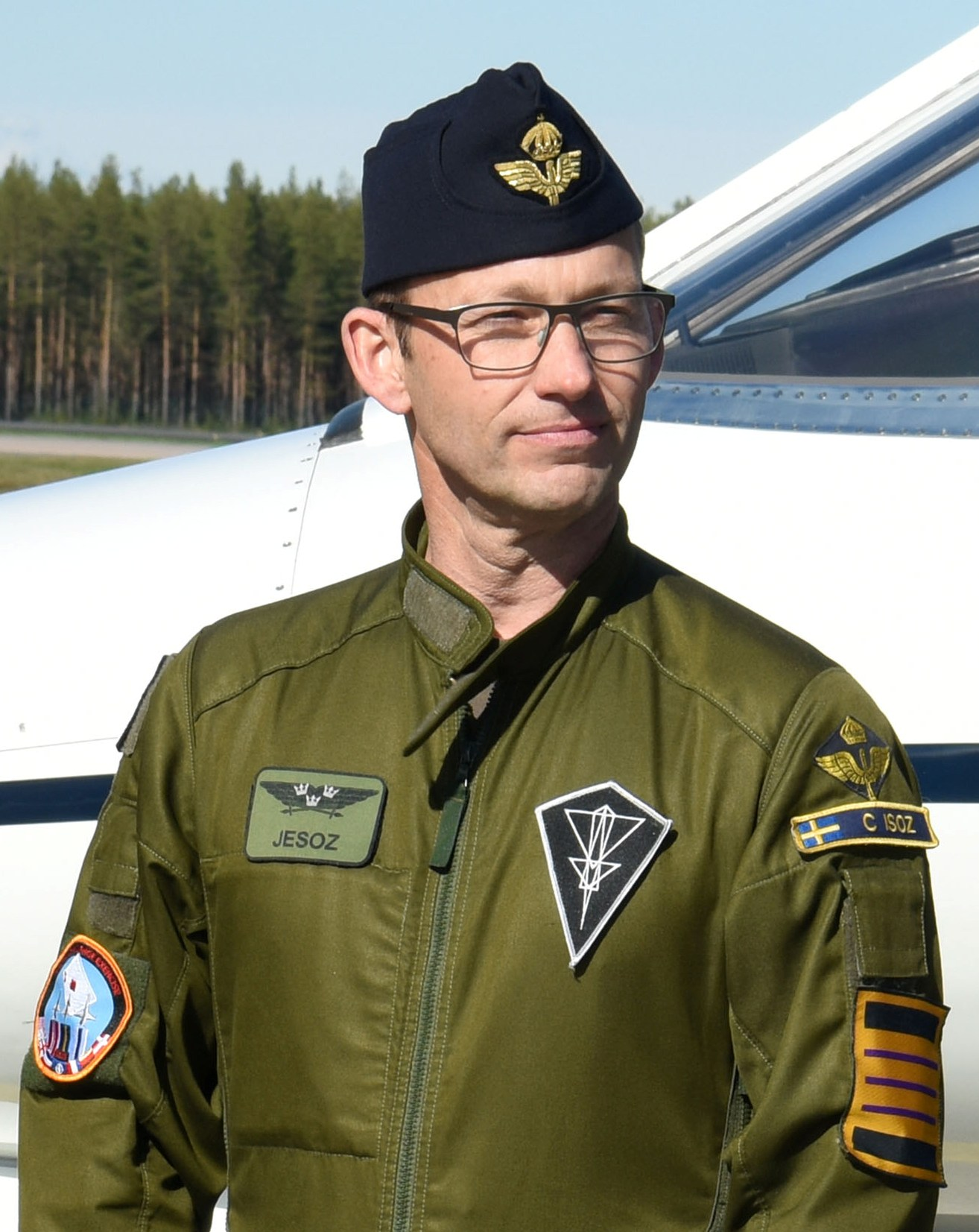
- Incumbent; BGen Claes Isoz since 28 June 2022
- Swedish Armed Forces
- Abbreviation: FlogC
- Reports to: Chief of Armed Forces Training & Procurement
- Seat: Swedish Armed Forces Headquarters, Lidingövägen 24, Stockholm
- Term length: No fixed term
- Constituting instrument: FFS 2013:4; FFS 2016:2; FIB 2020:5
- Precursor: Inspector of the Swedish Army Service Troops
- Formation: 2005

The Chief of Defence Logistics (Swedish: Försvarslogistikchefen, FlogC) is a senior position within the Swedish Armed Forces, responsible for all logistical requirements of the Armed Forces. The post was created in 2005.

== History ==
In 2005, a position of Inspector of Logistics (LogI) was established at the Swedish Armed Forces Headquarters at the same level as the other inspectors. The first inspector was Major General Åke Jansson, who prior to that was commander of the Swedish Armed Forces Logistics (FMLOG). LogI was then responsible for the units Göta Logistic Regiment (T 2), Swedish Armed Forces Logistics (FMLOG), Swedish Armed Forces Technical School (Försvarsmaktens tekniska skola, FMTS), National CBRN Defence Centre (SkyddC) and the Medical Center of the Swedish Armed Forces (FSC).

At the beginning of 2014, inspectors and military commanders transferred to the Training & Procurement Staff (PROD) from INSATS and the Chief Information Officer (CIO) was transferred to PROD. The Logistics Department (PROD LOG) and the Procurement Department (PROD MTRL) was organized into two departments under a joint Chief of Logistics. In 2014, the post changed its name from Chief of Logistics (LogC) to Chief of Defence Logistics (FlogC). Prior to 2017, the Chief of Defence Logistics was also head of the materiel side. In 2017, a division took place in such a way that there is a Chief of Defence Logistics and a Chief of Procurement, who has his own connection to the Defence Materiel Administration.

== Role ==
The Swedish Armed Forces Logistics (FMLOG), the Swedish Armed Forces Technical School (Försvarsmaktens tekniska skola, FMTS), the Swedish Armed Forces Centre for Defence Medicine (FömedC) are subordinate to the Chief of Defence Logistics. The Chief of Defence Logistics with the Logistics Department (PROD LOG) has production responsibility for these units but does not have the task of tactically commanding its subordinate units.

The Chief of Defence Logistics together with the Chief of Army, Chief of Navy and the Chief of Air Force as well as the Chief of Management System (Ledningssystemchefen, LSC), Assistant Chief of Armed Forces Training & Procurement, (Resursproduktionschefen, C PROD RPE) and the Chief of Home Guard are subordinate to the Chief of Armed Forces Training & Procurement.

== Chiefs ==
No.	Portrait	Chiefs	Took office	Left office	Time in office	Defence branch	Supreme Commander	Ref.
Inspector of Logistics (Logistikinspektör, LogI)
1	Åke Jansson [sv]	Major general Åke Jansson (born 1950)	2005	2006	0–1 years	Army	Håkan Syrén	
2	Tomas Fjellner [sv]	Brigadier general Tomas Fjellner (born 1953)	2006	2007	0–1 years	Air Force	Håkan Syrén	
Chief of Logistics (Logistikchef, LogC)
2	Tomas Fjellner [sv]	Brigadier general Tomas Fjellner (born 1953)	2007	2008	0–1 years	Air Force	Håkan Syrén	
3	Bengt Andersson	Major general Bengt Andersson (born 1955)	December 2008	December 2013	4–5 years	Navy (Amphibious Corps)	Håkan Syrén; Sverker Göranson	
Chief of Defence Logistics (Försvarslogistikchef, FlogC)
4	Thomas Engevall [sv]	Rear admiral Thomas Engevall (born 1960)	1 January 2014	2017	2–3 years	Navy	Sverker Göranson; Micael Bydén	
-	Örjan Nilsson	Colonel; Örjan Nilsson (born ?); Acting	1 April 2017	18 April 2017	17 days	Army	Micael Bydén	
5	Michael Nilsson [sv]	Brigadier general Michael Nilsson (born 1961)	19 April 2017 (Note: Nilsson was appointed Chief of Logistics and head of the Logistics Combat Forces Department (Logistikstridskraftsavdelningen) at the Training & Procurement Staff (PROD) from 1 January 2019.)	31 August 2022	5 years, 134 days	Army	Micael Bydén	(Note: In the middle of 2022, Nilsson's position as Chief of Defence Logistics was extended until 31 August 2022.)
6	Claes Isoz [sv]	Brigadier general Claes Isoz (born 1969)	28 June 2022	Incumbent	4 years, 71 days	Air Force	Micael Bydén; Michael Claesson	

== Deputy Chiefs ==
No.	Portrait	Chiefs	Took office	Left office	Time in office	Defence branch	Supreme Commander	Ref.
1	Bengt Andersson	Major general Bengt Andersson (born 1955)	2014	2014	0 years	Army	Sverker Göranson	
1	Gustaf Fahl [sv]	Colonel; Gustaf Fahl (born 1960)	1 June 2015	31 March 2017	1 year, 303 days	Army	Sverker Göranson; Micael Bydén	
2	Örjan Nilsson	Colonel; Örjan Nilsson (born ?)	19 April 2017	31 March 2018	346 days	Army	Micael Bydén	
