= Norrland Logistic Battalion =

- Norrlands trängbataljon
- Active: 1893–2004
- Country: Sweden
- Allegiance: Swedish Armed Forces
- Branch: Swedish Army
- Type: Service Troops
- Size: Battalion
- Part of: 4th Army Division (1893–1898); 6th Army Division (1898–1901); VI Army Division (1902–1927); Northern Army Division (1928–1936); II Army Division (1937–1942); II.milo (1942–1966); Milo NN (1966–1983); SAG (1983–1991); Milo NN (1991–1993); Milo N (1993–2000); I 5 (2000–2004)
- Garrison/HQ: Stockholm (1893–1898); Sollefteå (1898–2000); Östersund (2000–2004)
- Colors: Blue and white
- March: "Norrlands trängkårs marsch" (Smith) (Note: The march was established in 1953 by Army Order 33/1953 and for Norrland Logistic Battalion on 27 November 2002.)

Insignia
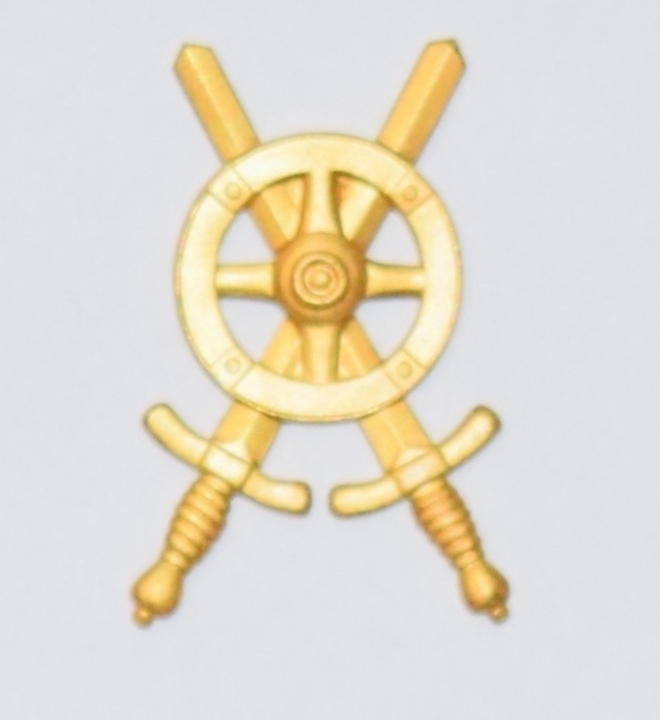
- Branch insignia

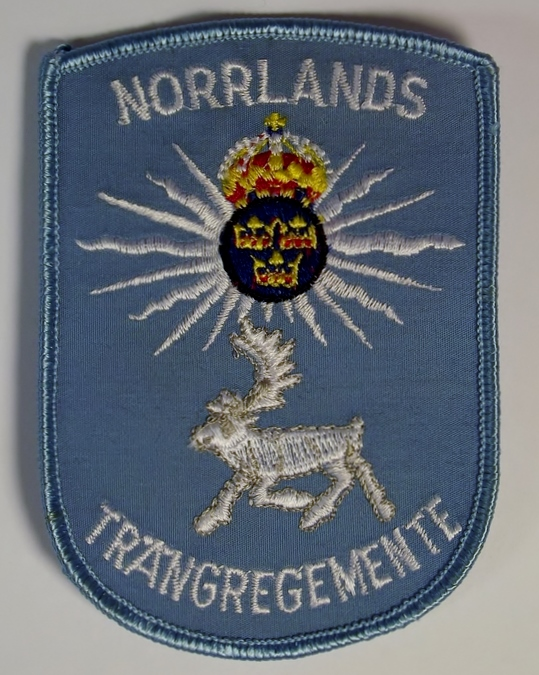
- Shoulder sleeve insignia

The Norrland Logistic Battalion (Swedish: Norrlands trängbataljon, Trängbat/I 5), previously Norrland Logistic Corps (Swedish: Norrlands trängkår, T 3) was a Swedish Army logistic unit operating between 1893 and 2004. The unit was first based in Stockholm, then for over 100 years in Sollefteå and finally in Östersund.

== History ==
The unit was raised 1893 as a battalion and förlades till Stockholm. Sollefteå municipal community (municipalsamhälle) offered the Swedish state to locate the logistic battalion to a couple of agricultural properties at Remsle mo next to the northern shore of the Ångerman River, and by a decision on 17 September 1893, 57 hectares and 3 are, were handed over free of charge to the state provided that Norrland Logistic Battalion was actually located in Sollefteå. The unit was relocated to Sollefteå in May 1898. The unit became a corps in 1902 and in the 1910s, the corps consisted of two logistic companies and a medical company with a total of 15 officers, 20 non-commissioned officers, 81 volunteers and conscripts from all over Norrland.

== Locations and training areas ==
=== Barracks ===
==== Stockholm ====
When the unit was formed in 1893, it was the first years located together with Svea Logistic Battalion in Marieberg, Stockholm. In May 1894, the unit was relocated to Fredrikshov Castle in Stockholm and on 7 May 1898, the unit officially moved into its newly built barracks establishment at Trängvägen in Sollefteå.

==== Sollefteå ====
The 1892 Army Order meant that conscription training became both longer and broader in content. Permanent accommodation buildings, so-called barracks, were required. On behalf of Sollefteå, SEK 370,000 was requested for the construction of a chancellery building, barracks building (later the A barracks), a food facility (later classroom), a barracks building (later D barracks), an exercise hall (later a gymnasium) and a workshop building, storage building and three outbuildings. When the Riksdag considered the proposal too expensive, the allocation was reduced to SEK 340,000. Sollefteå Municipality instead bought five older buildings for accommodation of sutler staff as well as tailors, shoemakers and workshops. The new establishment was taken into use in 1898. The drawings for all the new buildings were mostly made by architect Erik Josephson. A new army order in 1901 led to an increase in both staff and horses. A new barracks was built and put into operation in 1906 (B barracks). In addition, the western winter stable was built. In 1928, engine operation was introduced and a heated garage and workshops were built. The requirements of increased accommodation spaces were met with a new barracks (C-barracks) in 1941, as well as a number of new barracks, which were named Nipbyn. It was later demolished. A new hospital and exercise hall were built in 1944–1945. A new food establishment was completed in 1954 and another new barracks was built in 1959-1960 (E-barracks). In 1976, a training area for shooting practise, CBRN defense training and positioning exercises was opened, adjacent to the establishment. On 1 July 1992, the barracks area on Trängvägen was left and the unit was co-located with other units in the city on Regementsvägen in Hågesta. The southern barracks yard was declared a listed building in 1993.

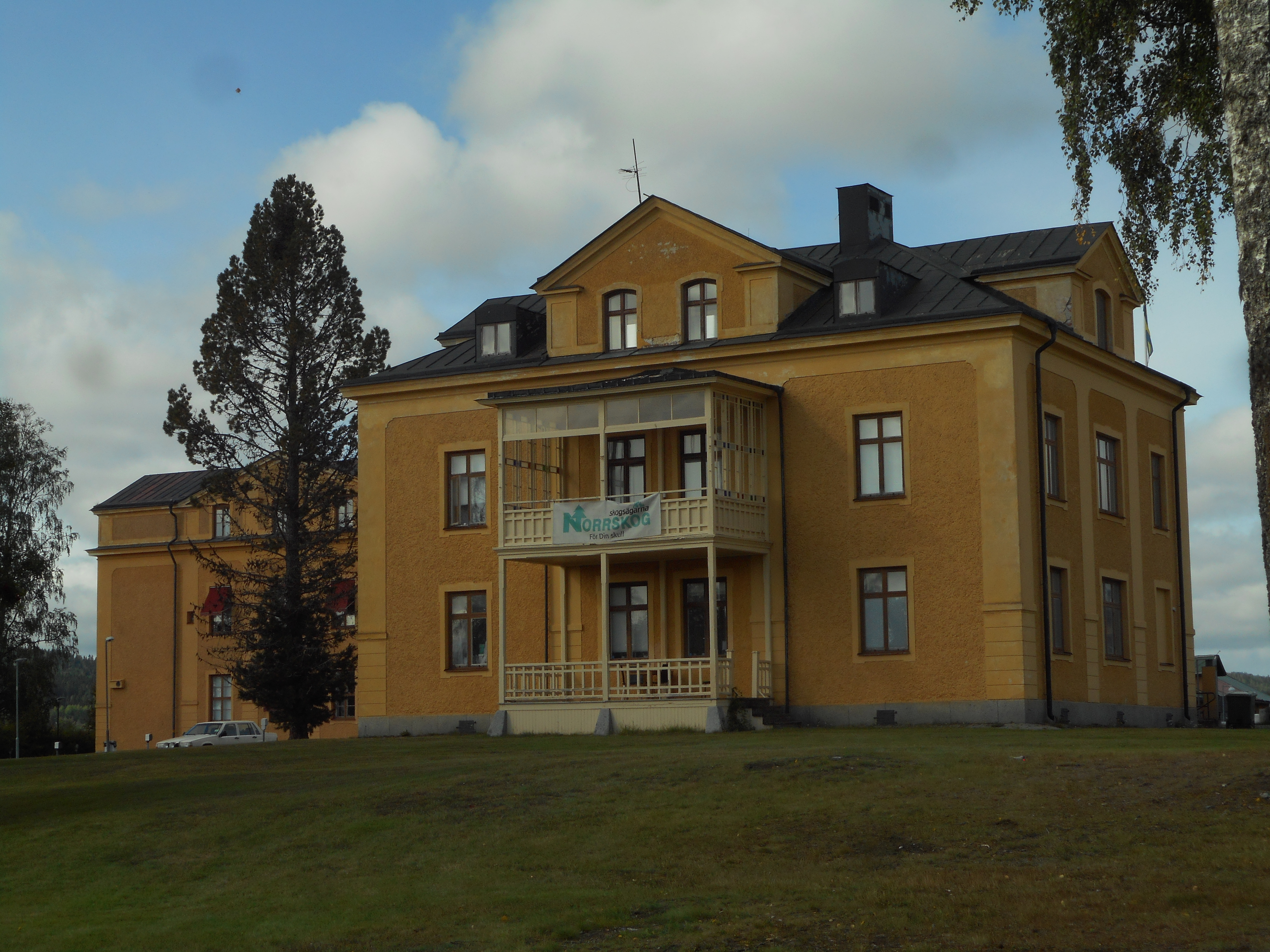
Chancellery building

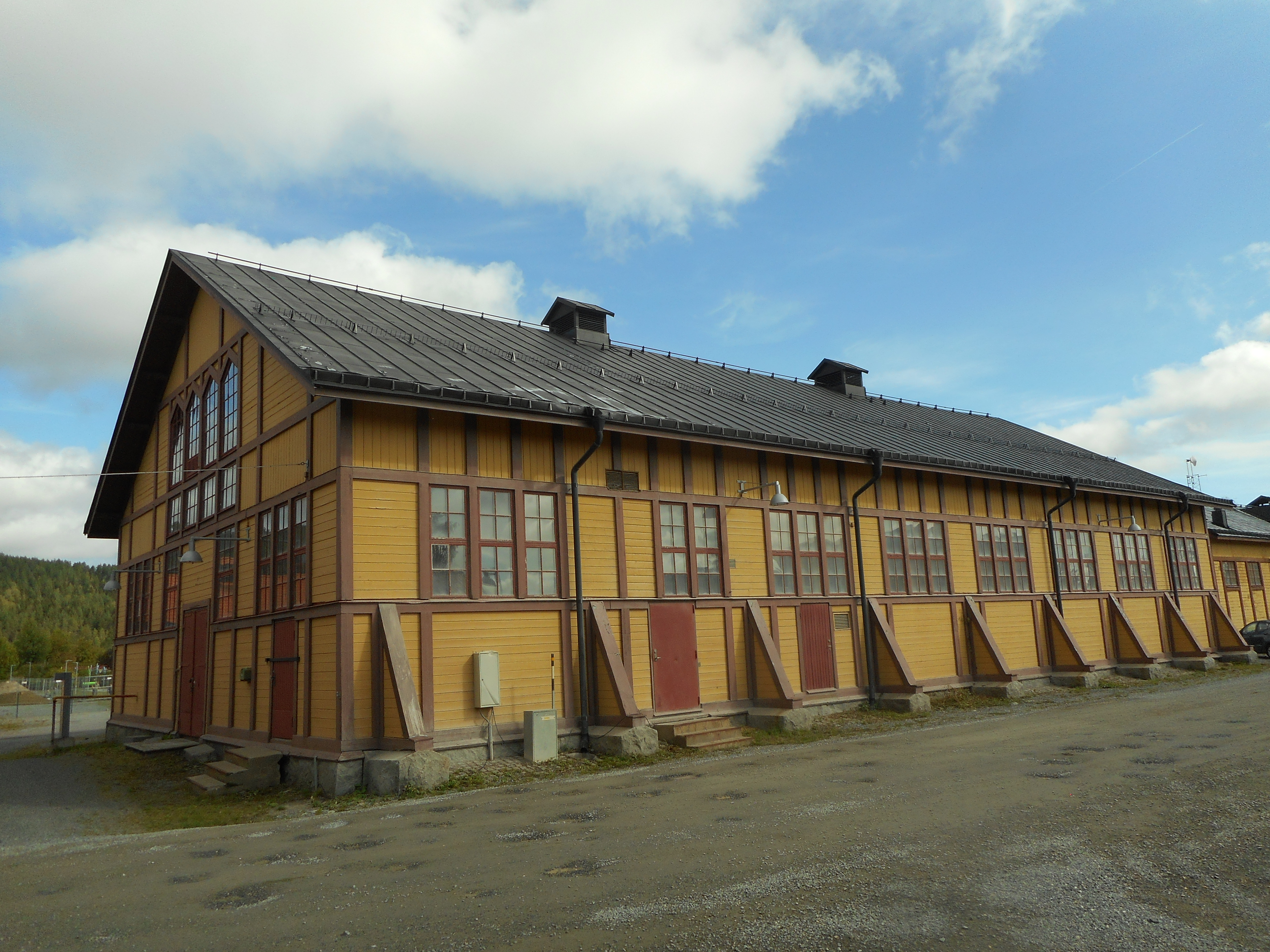
Riding hall

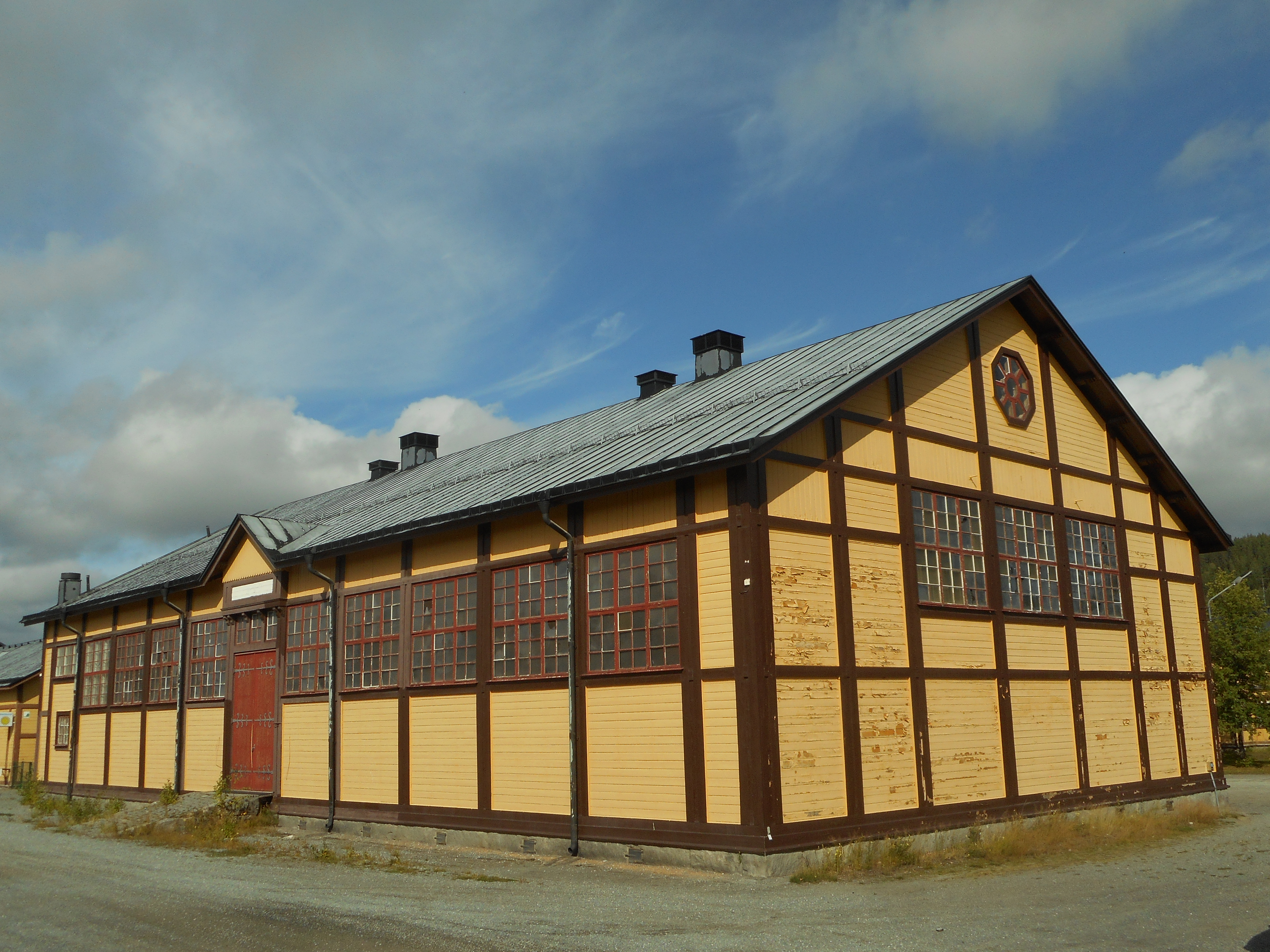
Gymnasium

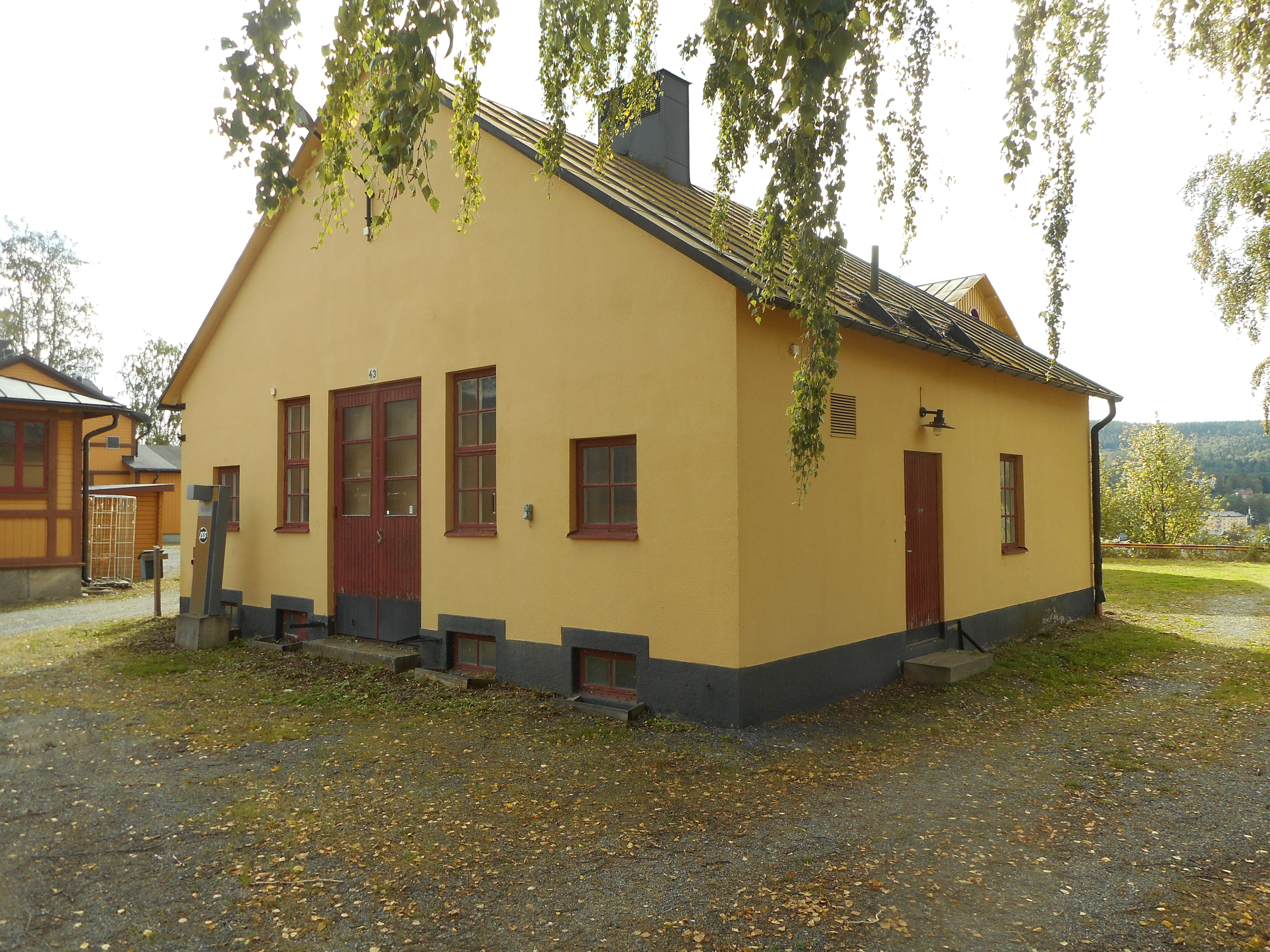
Work building

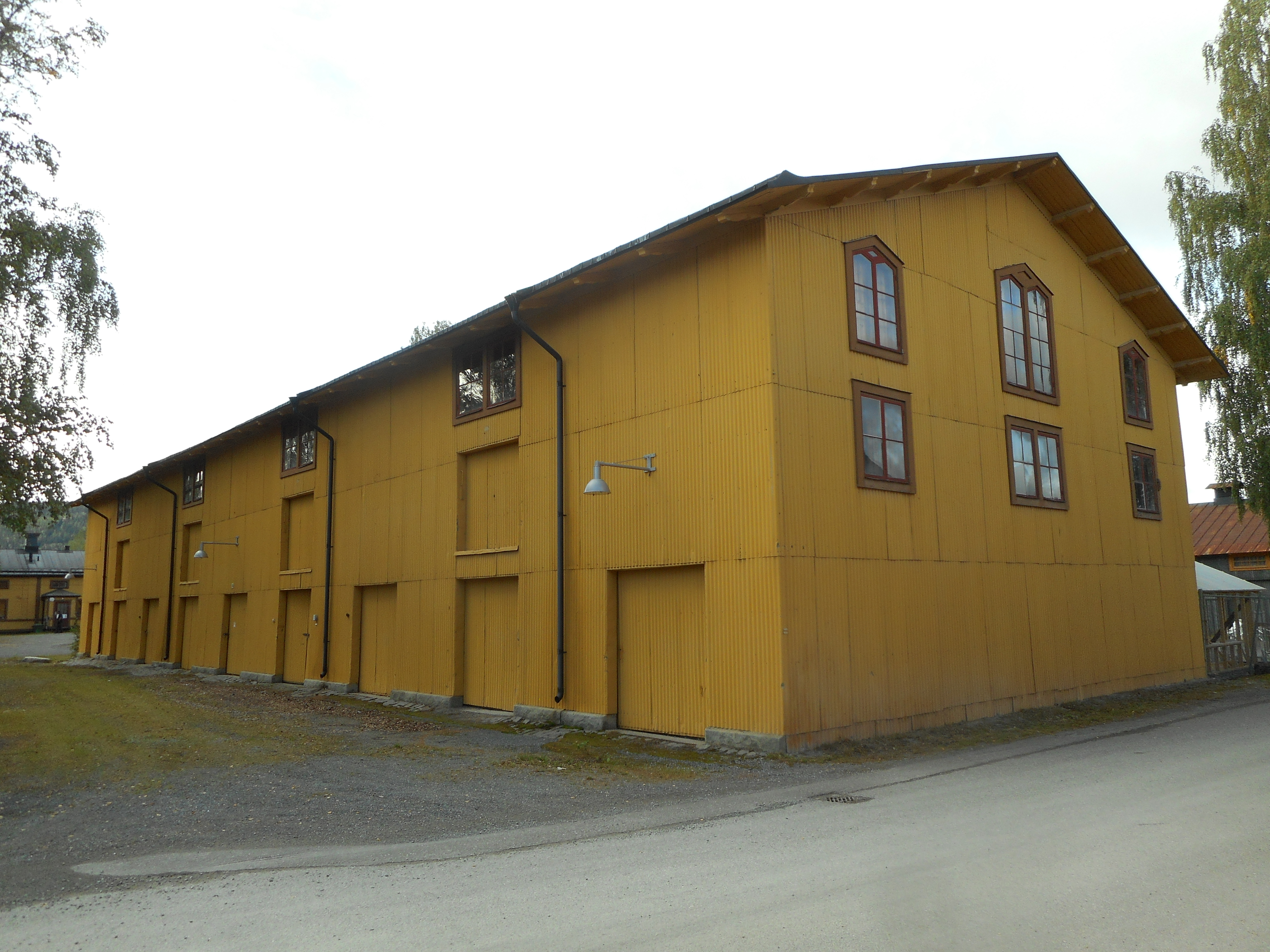
Storage

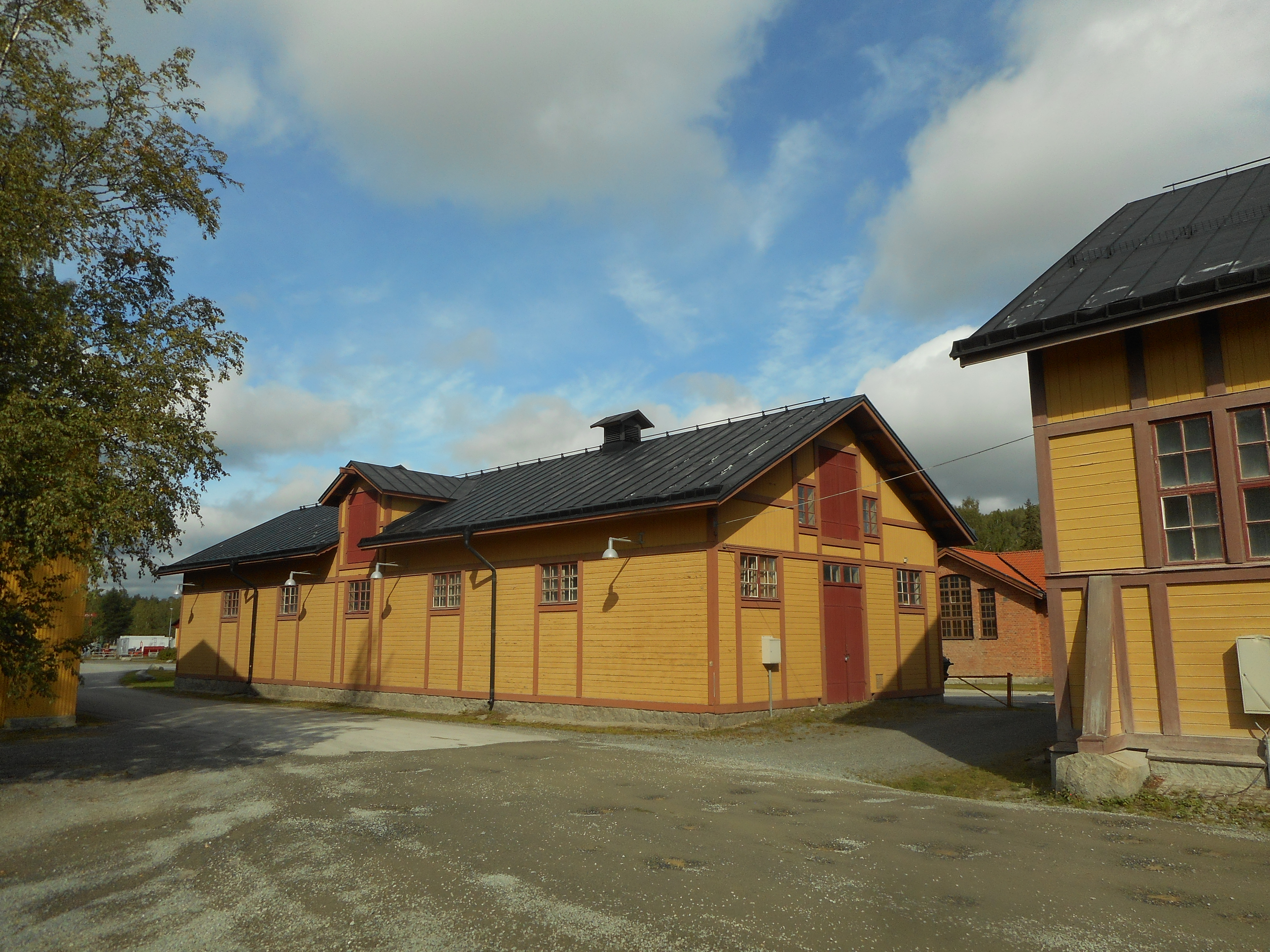
Western stable

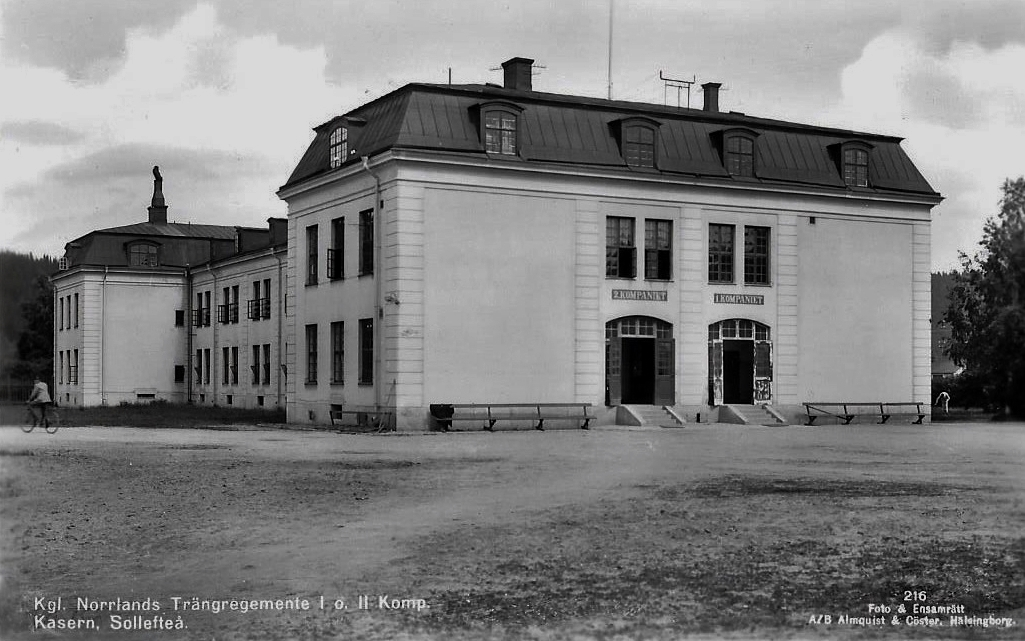
B barracks

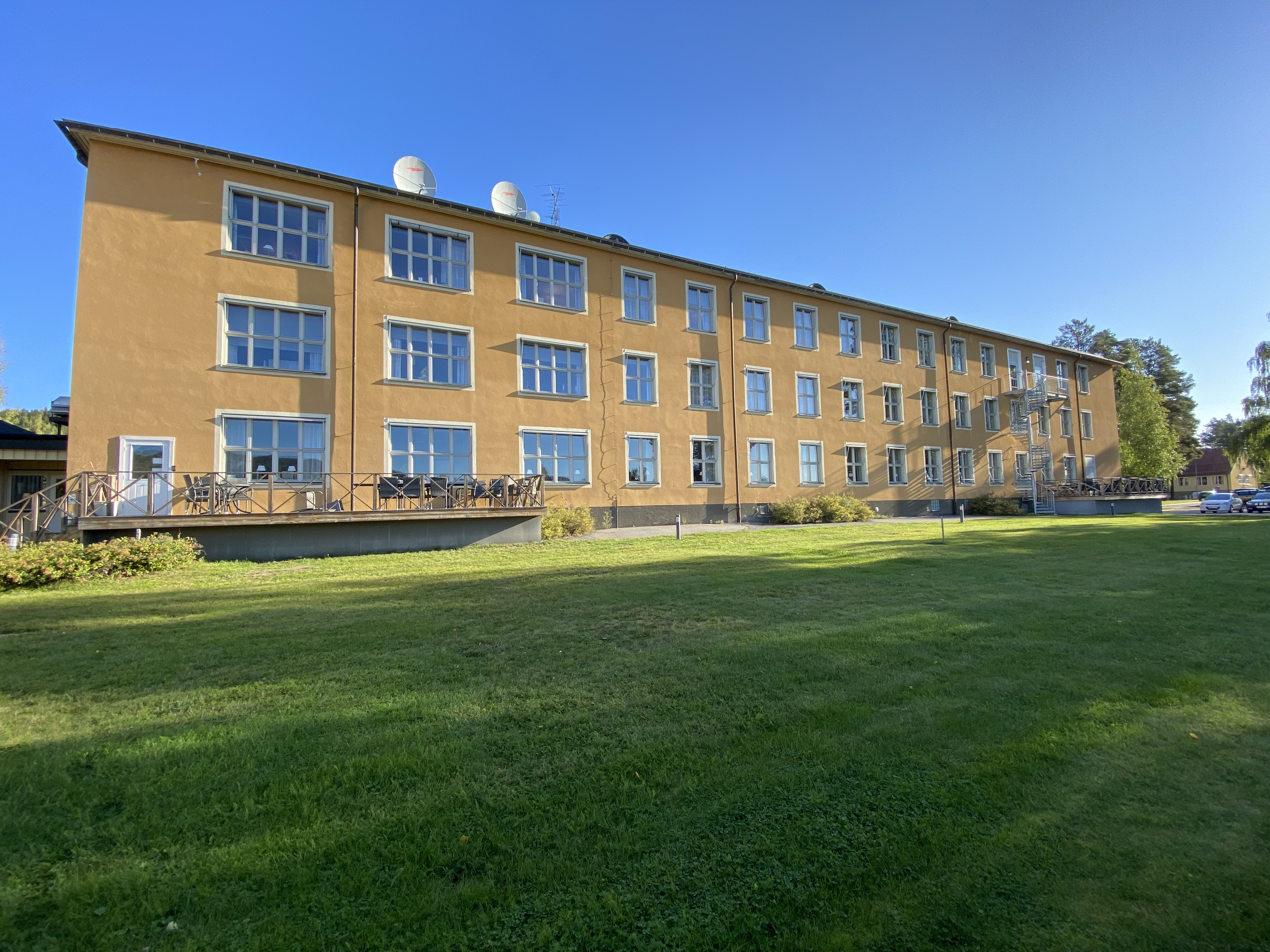
C barracks

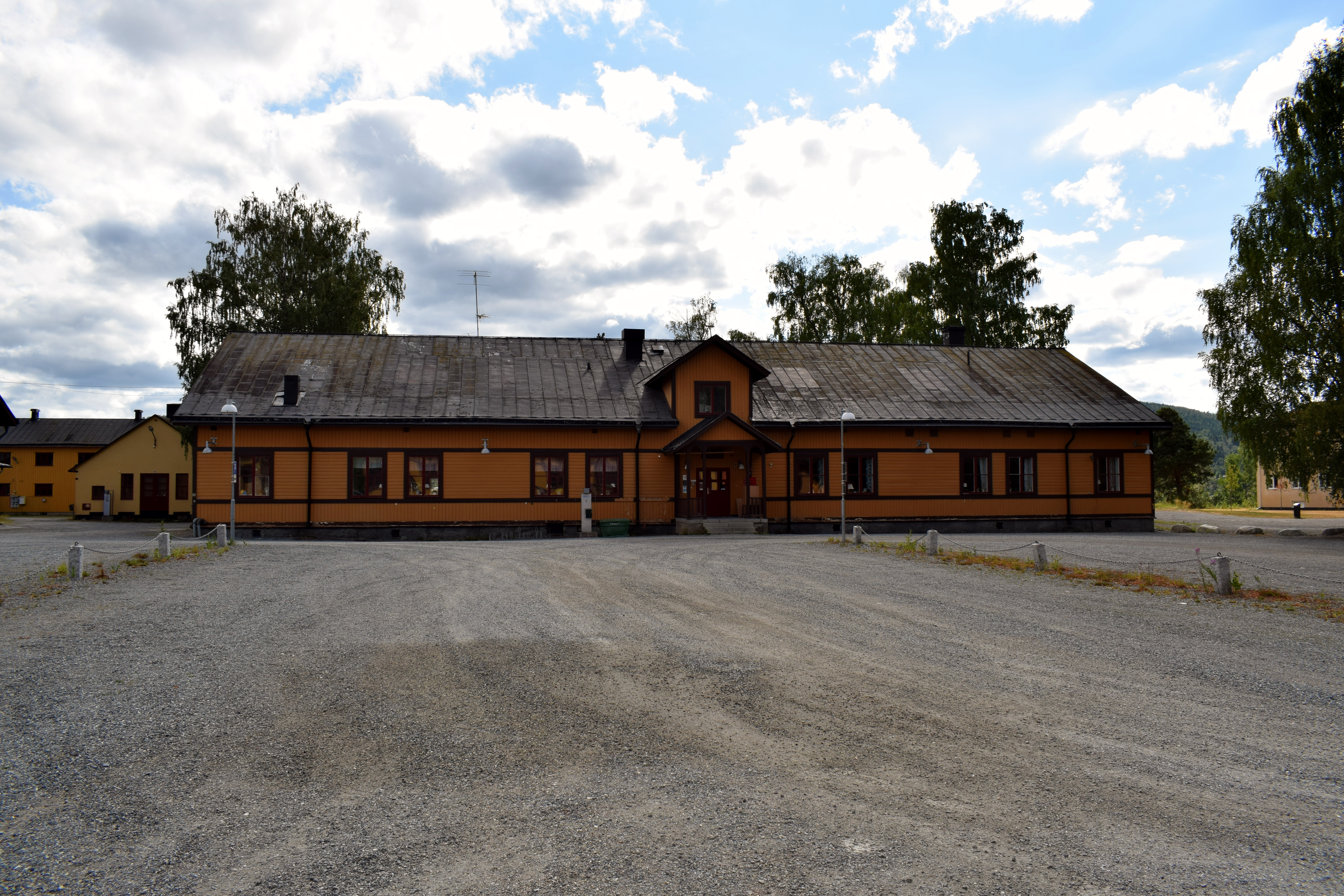
D barracks

==== Östersund ====
On 1 July 2000, the unit was relocated one last time, when it left Sollefteå and was co-located with Jämtland Ranger Regiment at Fältjägargränd in Östersund. In Östersund, the battalion was relocated to barracks 3. On 29 August 2001, the barracks was re-inaugurated, as it had been equipped with new wet rooms and new ventilation, all to adapt the premises to modern standards.

=== Detachment ===
- T 3 Ljusdal (T 3 L) was formed on 1 January 1946 as a mobilization center. The mobilization center was located about 15 km northeast of Ljusdal along Lostervägen. On 31 March 1957, the mobilization center was disbanded and transferred as a depot to Norrland Logistic Regiment.
- T 3 Sandviken (T 3 S) was formed on 1 January 1946 as a mobilization center. The mobilization center was located about 6 km north of Sandviken along Järbovägen. On 31 March 1957, the mobilization center was disbanded and transferred as a depot to Gävleborg Defence District (Gävleborgs försvarsområde, Fo 21).

== Heraldry and traditions ==
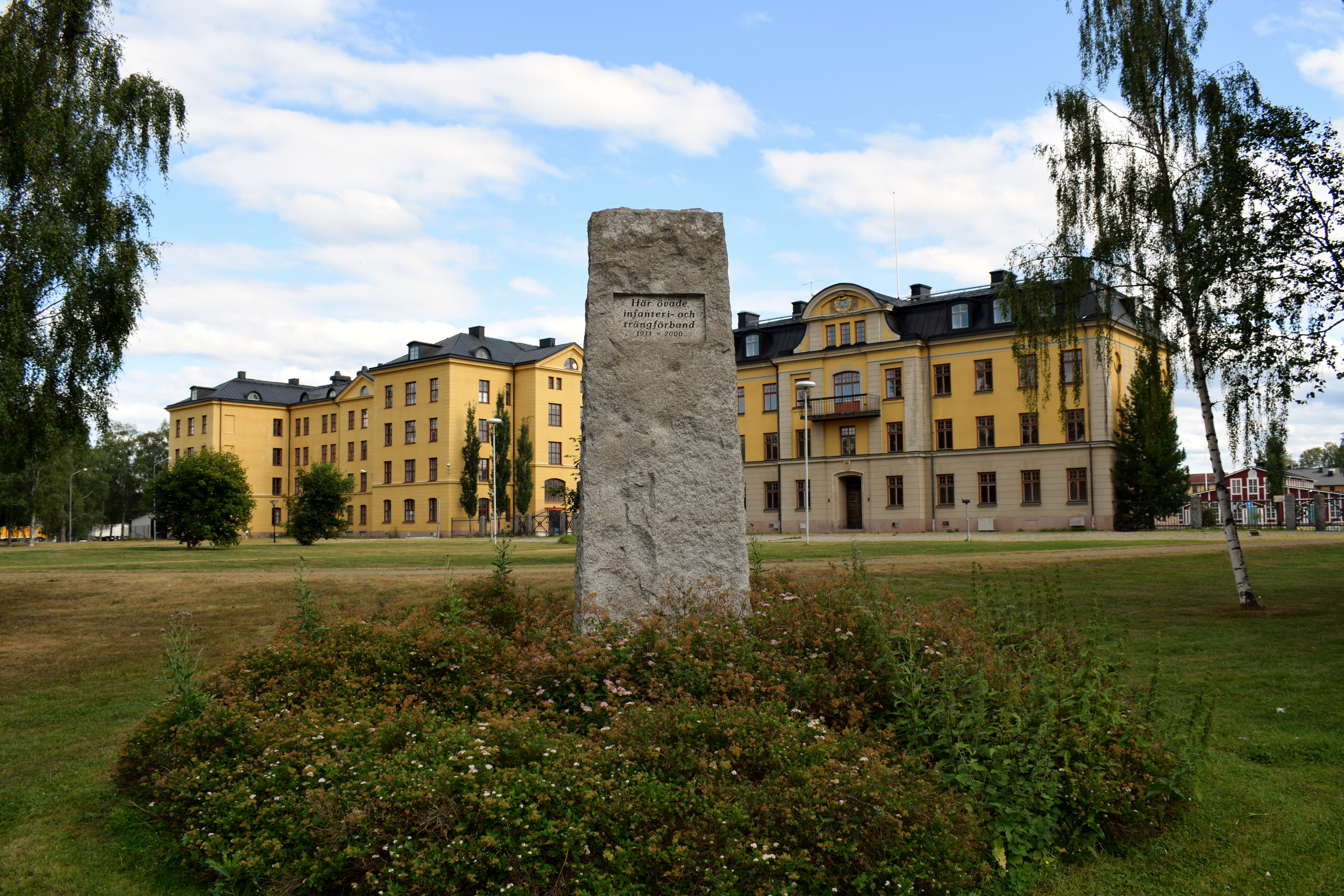
Memorial stone in Sollefteå.

=== Coat of arms ===
The coat of the arms of the unit was used from 1977 to 2004. Blazon: "Azure, the provincial badge of Västerbotten, a reindeer courant argent, armed and langued gules. The shield surmounted a cart wheel of four spokes over two swords in saltire, argent."

=== Colours, standards and guidons ===
The units within the Swedish Army Service Troops initially lacked their own colour, but at the 50th anniversary on 1 September 1935, the commander of the Eastern Army Division Lieutenant General Gösta Lilliehöök presented a colour to the Norrland Logistics Corps. On 10 September 1961, the unit's second colour was presented to the unit by the Chief of the Army, Lieutenant General Thord Bonde. On 21 October 1995, the unit received its last colour, which was presented at the Artillery Yard in Stockholm by the Chief of Army Staff, Lieutenant General Åke Sagrén. It was used as regimental colour by T 3 until 1 June 2000. The colour is drawn by Ingrid Lamby and embroidered by machine in insertion technique by the Engelbrektsson Flag factory. Blazon: "On light blue cloth in the middle, on a circular shield, the lesser coat of arms of Sweden according to the law, the shield surrounded by white tongues and rays. In the first corner the reindeer of the provincial badge of Västerbotten; white with red arms."

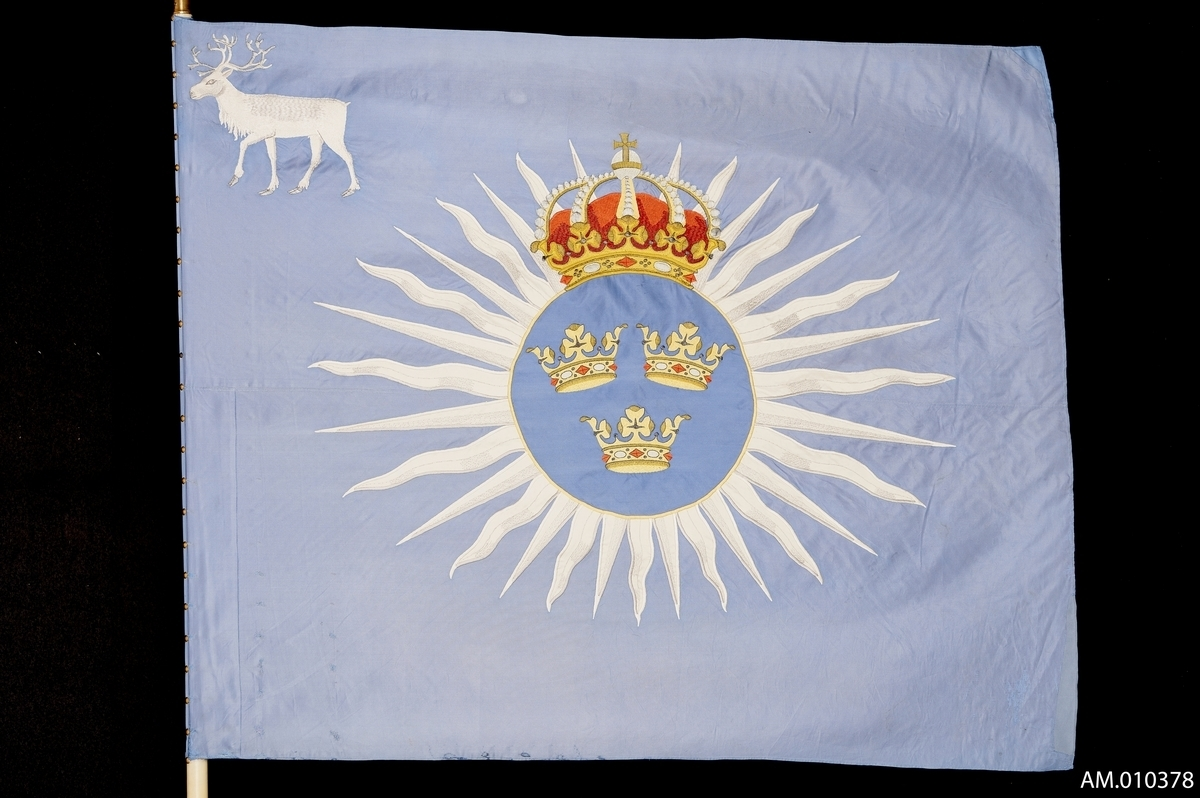
1935 colour

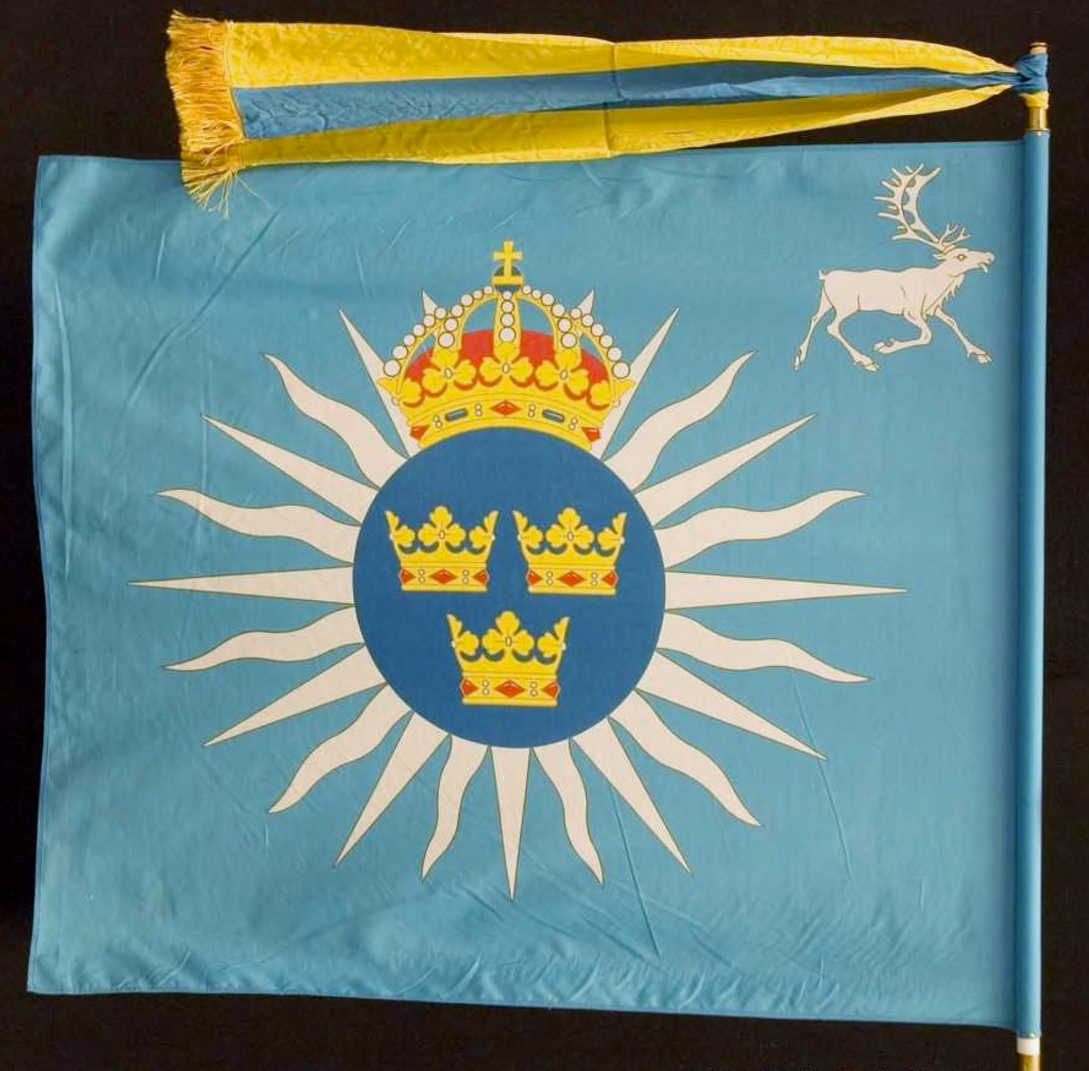
1985 guard colour

=== Medals ===
In 1994, the Norrlands trängkårs (Note: Norrland Logistic Battalion from 1997.) hedersmedalj ("Norrland Logistic Corps (T 3) Honorary Medal") in silver and bronze (NorrltrkSM/BM) of the 7th size was established. The medal ribbon is of blue moiré with white edges and a broad stripe of purple on the middle followed on both sides by a yellow stripe.

In 2000, the Norrlands trängkårs (T 3) minnesmedalj ("Norrland Logistic Corps (T 3) Commemorative Medal") i silver (NorrltrkSMM) of the 8th size was established. The medal ribbon is of blue moiré with white edges and a yellow stripe on the middle followed on both sides by a narrow purple stripe.

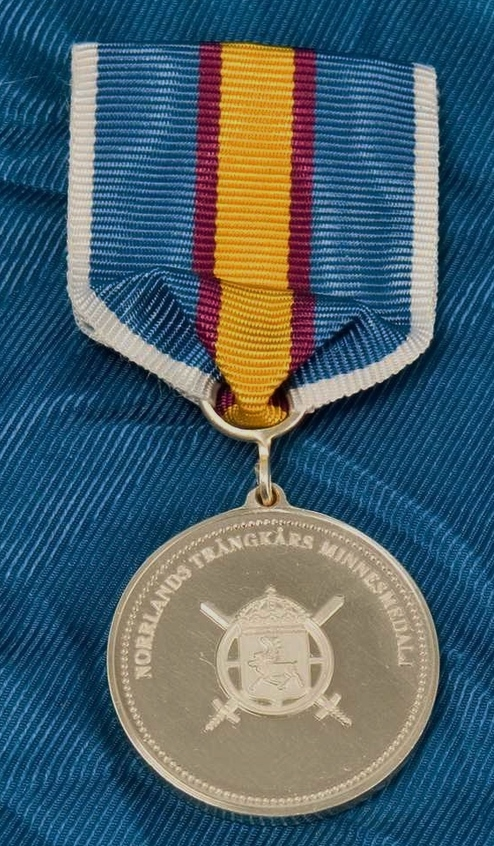
Commemorative medal

== Commanding officers ==
- 1893–1897: Henrik Albin Stjernspetz
- 1897–1903: Nils Gustaf Hallström
- 1903–1907: Per Reinhold Georg Wilhelm von Heideman
- 1907–1908: Eduard Kraak
- 1908–1916: Berndt Reinhold Martin Festin
- 1917–1918: Richard Theodor Berg
- 1919–1924: Karl Erik Erhardt
- 1924–1929: Gösta Frössén
- 1929–1936: Carl Hilding Carlsson
- 1936–1944: Axel Joseph Einar Qvarnström
- 1944–1948: Sten Camitz
- 1948–1955: Bjarne Hemming Natt och Dag
- 1955–1958: Yngve Diurlin
- 1958–1963: Sigurd S:son Melin
- 1963–1972: Dag Nordenskjöld
- 1972–1974: Börje Wallberg
- 1974–1984: Per-Anders Lindespång
- 1984–1993: Björn Eklund
- 1994–1996: C-G Urban Staaf
- 1996–1998: Jan Bergström
- 1998–1998: Leif Östberg (acting)
- 1998–2000: Per Lennerman
- 2000–2005: Anders Andersson

== Names, designations and locations ==
Note: The word träng ("train") as in trängregemente is translated to either "train", "service force"; "transport"; "baggage"; "supply vehicles" pl.; (Br) "army service corps", (US) "maintenance and supply troops", "transportation" (adj.), or "logistic".

Name	Translation	From		To
Kungl Norrlands trängbataljon	Royal Norrland Logistic Battalion	1893-11-03	–	1902-06-30
Kungl. Norrland trängkår	Royal Norrland Logistic Corps	1902-07-01	–	1949-06-30
Kungl Norrlands trängregemente	Royal Norrland Logistic Regiment	1949-07-01	–	1974-12-31
Norrlands trängregemente	Norrland Logistic Regiment	1975-01-01	–	1994-06-30
Norrlands trängkår	Norrland Logistic Corps	1994-07-01	–	2000-06-30
Norrlands trängbataljon	Norrland Logistic Battalion	2000-07-01	–	2004-12-31
Avvecklingsorganisation	Decommissioning Organisation	2005-01-01	–	2006-06-30
Designation		From		To
No. 3		1893-11-03	–	1914-09-30
T 3		1914-10-01	–	2000-06-30
Trängbat(NT)/I 5		2000-07-01	–	2004-12-31
Location		From		To
Stockholm Garrison/Fredrikshov		1893-11-03	–	1898-05-06
Sollefteå Garrison		1898-06-07	–	2001-03-31
Östersund Garrison		2000-07-01	–	2006-06-30

== See also ==
- List of Swedish logistic regiments
