= Gottfrid Björck =

Swedish Army officer

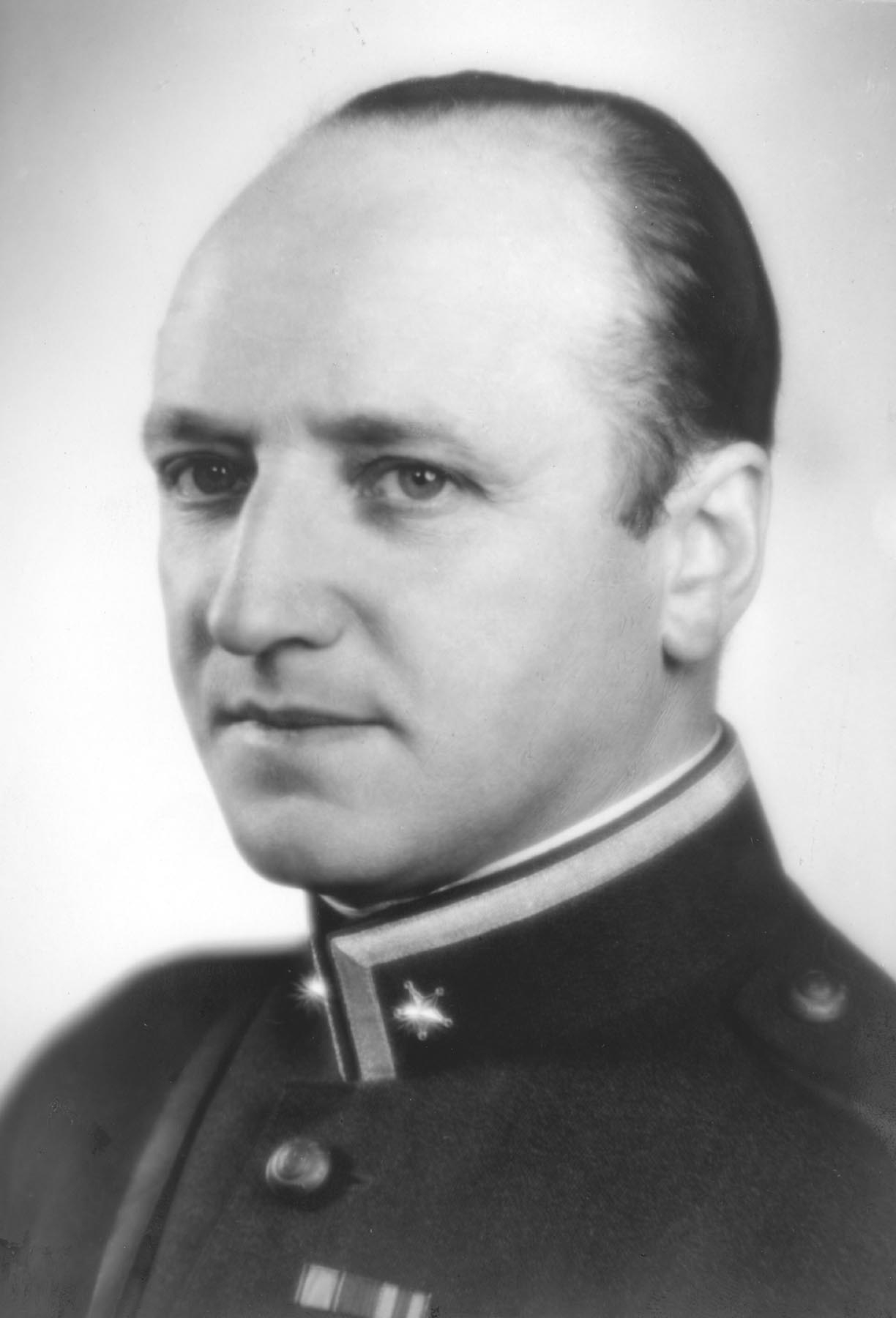
- Björck as major.
- Born: Karl Gottfrid Björck; 31 May 1893; Bäckseda, Sweden
- Died: 8 July 1981 (aged 88)
- Military career
- Allegiance: Sweden
- Branch: Swedish Army
- Service years: 1915–1949
- Rank: Major General
- Commands: Göta Logistic Corps; Swedish Army Service Troops

Major General Karl Gottfrid Björck (31 May 1893 – 8 July 1981) was a Swedish Army officer. He served as Inspector of the Swedish Army Service Troops from 1946 to 1949, and as such, was chief of transportation of the White Buses operation to rescue concentration camp inmates in areas under Nazi control and transport them to Sweden.

== Early life ==
Björck was born on 31 May 1893 in Bäckseda, Jönköping County, Sweden, the son of merchant Karl Björck and his wife Anna (née Jonsson). He passed studentexamen in 1913 and was commissioned into the Swedish Army Service Troops as a second lieutenant in 1915.

== Career ==
Björck attended the Royal Swedish Army Staff College from 1922 to 1924 and served as captain in the General Staff from 1928 to 1934. In 1936, Björck was appointed aide-de-camp to His Majesty the King, and in 1941 he was appointed chief aide-de-camp (överadjutant) to His Majesty the King, a position he held until the king died in 1950.

He was promoted to lieutenant colonel in the Swedish Army Service Troops and was appointed commanding officer of Göta Logistic Corps (T 2) in 1939. Two years later, Björck was promoted to colonel in the Swedish Army Service Troops and assumed the position as head of the Information and Press Department of the Defence Staff. In 1942 he was appointed head of Logistic Department in the Army Inspectorate (Arméinspektionen). The same year Björck became a member of the Folkberedskapsnämnden ("National Preparedness Commission"). He was also a military member of Statens informationsstyrelse ("National Information Board") from 1942 to 30 June 1944 and chairman of the board of the Kungafonden ("The King's Fund") from 1943 to 1958.

Björck served as Inspector of the Swedish Army Service Troops from 1946 to 1949 when he was promoted to major general. While serving as Inspector of the Swedish Army Service Troops, Björck was appointed chief of transportation of the White Buses operation to rescue concentration camp inmates in areas under Nazi control and transport them to Sweden. In 1949, Björck became a member of the Statens organisationsnämnd ("National Organization Board") which he was until 1961. Björck worked as a consultant at the Swedish Agency for Administrative Development (Statskontoret) from 1961 to 1965.

== Personal life ==
In 1918 he married Hovsångerska Irma Krook (1898–1993), the daughter of Nils Krook and Anna Jacobsson. Björck was the father of Flory (born 1919) and Sven (born 1923).

== Dates of rank ==
- 1915 – Second lieutenant
- 19?? – Lieutenant
- 1928 – Captain
- 19?? – Major
- 1939 – Lieutenant colonel
- 1941 – Colonel
- 1949 – Major general

== Awards and decorations ==
=== Swedish ===
- (Sweden) King Gustaf V's Jubilee Commemorative Medal (1948)
- (Sweden) King Gustaf V's Jubilee Commemorative Medal (1928)
- (Sweden) King Gustaf V's Commemorative Medal (1951)
- (Sweden) Commander 1st Class of the Order of the Sword (15 November 1947)
- (Sweden) Commander of the Order of the Sword (15 November 1945)
- (Sweden) Commander 1st Class of the Order of Vasa
- (Sweden) Knight of the Order of Vasa (1933)
- (Sweden) Knight of the Order of the Polar Star (1944)
- (Sweden) Swedish Voluntary Motor Transport Corps Merit Badge in gold
- (Sweden) Shooting Medal

=== Foreign ===
- (Denmark) Commander 2nd Class of the Order of the Dannebrog
- (Norway) Commander of the Order of St. Olav
- Knight 1st Class of the Order of the White Rose of Finland
- Commander First Class of the Order of the Lion of Finland

== Honours ==
- Member of the Royal Swedish Academy of War Sciences (1939)

Military offices
Preceded by Ivar Gewert	Inspector of the Swedish Army Service Troops; 1946–1949	Succeeded by Knut Hagberg
