= Bengt Andersson (Swedish officer) =

Swedish officer (born 1955)

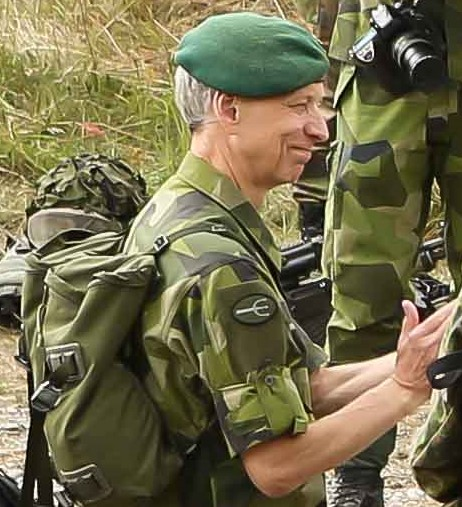
- Andersson during BALTOPS 2016.
- Born: Bengt Erik Lennart Andersson; 31 August 1955 (age 71); Hässleholm, Sweden
- Military career
- Allegiance: Sweden
- Branch: Swedish Amphibious Corps
- Service years: 1978–2020
- Rank: Major General
- Commands: 1st Marine Regiment; Naval Tactical Command; Deputy Chief of Joint Operations; Chief of Logistics; Deputy Chief of Defence Logistics; Nordic Battlegroup 08; Nordic Battlegroup 15; Aurora 17
- Conflicts: Cyprus conflict

Major General Bengt Erik Lennart Andersson (born 31 August 1955) was a senior officer in the Swedish Amphibious Corps. Andersson served as head of the Naval Tactical Command (2003–2005), as Deputy Chief of Joint Operations (2007–2008), as Chief of Logistics (2008–2013) and as commanding officer of Nordic Battlegroup 08 and Nordic Battlegroup 15.

== Early life ==
Andersson was born on 31 August 1955 in Hässleholm Parish, Kristianstad County. He graduated from secondary school after attending a natural science program. When the time came to do his military service, Andersson chose, despite the fact that Hässleholm then had two regiments, Scanian Logistic Regiment (T 4) and Scanian Dragoon Regiment (P 2), to apply to the Coastal Artillery and got a place as a reserve officer aspirant at Älvsborg Coastal Artillery Regiment (KA 4) in Gothenburg.

== Career ==
Andersson enrolled at the Royal Swedish Naval Academy in 1975 and graduated in 1978. He was promoted to lieutenant the same year and was assigned to Karlskrona Coastal Artillery Regiment, where he came to serve until 1985. During this time, Andersson worked with heavy mobile artillery, missile service and engine service. During this time I was also a Home Guard instructor. He was promoted to captain in 1981 and served in 1983 as duty officer in the Swedish UN Rifle Battalion in Cyprus, part of the United Nations Peacekeeping Force in Cyprus (UNFICYP). He attended the General Course at the Swedish Armed Forces Staff College from 1984 to 1985. In 1986 he was promoted to major and from 1986 to 1987 Andersson served was head of the Amphibious Office in the Naval Staff, where he was responsible for handling the transition to the amphibious system.

He attended the Technical Course for the Navy at the Swedish Armed Forces Staff College from 1987 to 1989 and was a study officer at the Naval Staff from 1989 to 1991. From 1991 to 1995, Andersson was first deputy commander and then regular commander of the Amphibious Battalion in Vaxholm Coastal Artillery Regiment. He was promoted to lieutenant colonel in 1993 and to lieutenant colonel with special duties in 1995. He attended the Marine Corps Command and Staff College in the United States from 1995 to 1996 where he was designated as a distinguished graduate. From 1996 to 1997, Andersson served as head of the Tactics Department in the Swedish Coastal Artillery Center (Kustartillericentrum, KAC) and was then Chief of Staff of the Coastal Artillery Center from 1997 to 1998. In 1998, he was promoted to colonel and served as Deputy Operation Commander at the staff of the Middle Military District from 1998 to 2000. Andersson was project manager for the Nordic Peace 1998 and Viking 1999 military exercises. He took the basic course at the Institute for Higher Total Defense Education at the Swedish National Defence College in 1999 and the Swedish National Defence College's management course at Solbacka in 2001.

Andersson commanded the 1st Coastal Artillery Brigade and the 1st Marine Regiment from 2000 to 2002. In 2002, he was promoted to brigadier general and was head of the Naval Tactical Command from 2003 to 2005. Andersson served as Deputy Chief of Joint Operations from 2007 to 2008. After being promoted to major general, he was Operation Commander for Nordic Battlegroup 08. From 2008 to 2013, Andersson served as Chief of Logistics in the Swedish Armed Forces Headquarters and during 2014 as Deputy Chief of Defence Logistics. After that, he was from 2014 to 2015 the Operation Commander for Nordic Battlegroup 15. In the years 2015–2017, he planned the Aurora 17 military exercise, for which he was then the exercise director. Andersson was then exercise director in Stockholm for the Swedish Armed Forces exercise which was conducted between May and June 2020. He retired in January 2020 more than 41 years of service. He started serving as a reserve officer from the same month.

== Personal life ==
Andersson is married and has two children.

== Dates of rank ==
- 1978 – Lieutenant
- 1981 – Captain
- 1986 – Major
- 1993 – Lieutenant colonel
- 1995 – Överstelöjtnant med särskild tjänsteställning
- 1998 – Colonel
- 2002 – Brigadier general
- 200? – Major general

== Honours ==
- Member of the Royal Swedish Society of Naval Sciences (1996) (vice president 2001–2006)
- Member of the Royal Swedish Academy of War Sciences (2002)

Military offices
Preceded by Jörgen Ericsson	Naval Tactical Command; 2003–2005	Succeeded by Odd Werin
Preceded by None	Deputy Chief of Joint Operations; 2007–2008	Succeeded by Anders Brännström
Preceded by Tomas Fjellner	Chief of Logistics; 2008–2013	Succeeded by Thomas Engevall
