= Listed buildings in Västernorrland County =

There are 68 listed buildings (Swedish: byggnadsminne) in Västernorrland County.

== Härnösand Municipality ==
Image	Name	Premise	Number of buildings	Year built	Architect	Coordinates	ID
	Fd. Landsarkivet; Härnösand	Juristen 6	1			62.63209°N 17.94676°E	21300000012997
	Gamla Landstatshuset; Härnösand	Juristen 6	3			62.63244°N 17.94567°E	21300000012986
	Gamla Lasarettet, Härnösand	Kråkan 2 previously 1	1			62.62956°N 17.93286°E	21300000012979
	Länsresidenset; Härnösand	Residenset 1	1			62.63239°N 17.93722°E	21300000012992
	Hemsö fästning	Havsto 1:1	2			62.72351°N 18.12122°E	21300000016415
	Härnösands rådhus	Rådhuset 1	1			62.63257°N 17.94087°E	21300000012792
	Domkapitelhuset; Härnösand	Timmermannen 14	1			62.63055°N 17.94099°E	21300000012990
	Nybergska huset	Banken 11	1			62.63330°N 17.94259°E	21300000012796
	Sankt Petrilogen	Vinstocken 10 previously Vinstocken 3-8	1			62.63156°N 17.94349°E	21300000012794

== Kramfors Municipality ==
Image	Name	Premise	Number of buildings	Year built	Architect	Coordinates	ID
	previously Missionskyrkan, Nyadal	Hornön 2:14	2			62.81664°N 17.94372°E	21300000012965
	Barsta kapell	Barsta 1:57	1			62.86166°N 18.39759°E	21300000004411
	Bjärtrå kungsgård	Kungsgården 19:2	1			63.00452°N 17.83355°E	21300000012804
	IOGT/Föreningslokalen Babelsberg	Babel 5	1			62.92920°N 17.77994°E	21300000012807
	Rundlogen i Viätt	Viätt 1:1	1			63.07171°N 17.82867°E	21300000012964
	Salum	Ullångers-Salum 3:2	1			63.00364°N 18.16318°E	21300000012799
	Sandöbron	Sandö 2:2, 2:5; Lunde 2:31, 2:74, 3:25-26, 3:8, 8:1; S:1	1			62.88347°N 17.87815°E	21300000012805
	Skoved	Skoved 3:2	1			63.03029°N 18.31138°E	21300000012801
	Wästerlunds konditori	Lunde 2:26-27	1			62.88153°N 17.86983°E	21300000012976

== Sollefteå Municipality ==
Image	Name	Premise	Number of buildings	Year built	Architect	Coordinates	ID
	Gamla apotekshuset, Sollefteå	Apotekaren 3 previously stadsäga 372	1			63.16733°N 17.26999°E	21300000012819
	Norrlands trängregemente/T3	Remsle 13:64	13			63.17404°N 17.26830°E	21300000012969
	Tingshuset, Sollefteå	Rättvisan 4	4			63.16766°N 17.28645°E	21300000012955
	Talmansgården; Multrå	Skedom 16:1	2			63.17001°N 17.32765°E	21300000012823
	Gålsjö bruk	Gålsjö 1:3	14			63.18886°N 17.81693°E	21300000012816
	Holms säteri	Holm 1:13	8			63.17011°N 17.62642°E	21300000012821
	Sollefteå prästgård	Sollefteå prästbord 2:1 samt del av 2:2	1			63.16177°N 17.28461°E	21300000012811
	Österåsens hälsohem (fd. sanatorium)	Österås 8:1	8			63.21582°N 17.18670°E	21300000012817

== Sundsvall Municipality ==
Image	Name	Premise	Number of buildings	Year built	Architect	Coordinates	ID
	Posthuset, Sundsvall	Borgmästaren 10	1			62.38890°N 17.30291°E	21300000012931
	Försäkringsbolaget Sveas hus	Jupiter 4	1			62.39099°N 17.31068°E	21300000012940
	Casselska huset	Mercurius 11:1	1			62.39050°N 17.31425°E	21000001533143
	Minerva 6	Minerva 6	3			62.39109°N 17.31236°E	21300000012950
	Köpmännens hus	Netto 9	1			62.38926°N 17.30504°E	21300000012893
	Metodistkyrkan, Sundsvall	Nöjet 10 previously Nöjet 2	1			62.39079°N 17.30231°E	21300000012850
	Fd. Centralhotellet, Sundsvall	Rätten 1	1			62.39011°N 17.30746°E	21300000012949
	Stadshuset; Sundsvall	Stadshuset 1	1			62.39024°N 17.30654°E	21300000012926
	Wikströmska huset	Tara 2	1			62.38909°N 17.30693°E	21300000012939
	Tillbudet 2	Tillbudet 2	1			62.38988°N 17.30175°E	21300000012932
	Gamla Riksbankshuset, Sundsvall	Vinsten 2 previously Penningen 2	1			62.39137°N 17.30327°E	21300000012851
	Bernska huset	Glädjen 4 previously Glädjen 10	1			62.39159°N 17.30518°E	21300000012835
	Biografteatern Svea	Mars 1	1			62.38912°N 17.30844°E	21300000012842
	Blombergska husen	Jupiter 3, 5	2			62.39102°N 17.31137°E	21300000012837
	Dahlman-Nordlingska huset	Minerva 4	1			62.39080°N 17.31182°E	21300000012845
	Elfströmska huset	Bacchus 3	1			62.39022°N 17.31373°E	21300000012834
	Föreningslokalen Thor	Gista 5:16	1			62.46620°N 17.44728°E	21300000012948
	Galtströms bruk	Armplågan 1:1, 1:158, 1:174, 1:176-177; Armsjön 1:1	30			62.16378°N 17.49426°E	21300000012958
	Grahnska huset	Hälsan 6	1			62.39127°N 17.30758°E	21300000012945
	Gustav Adolfsskolan	Gustaf Adolfsskolan 1	2			62.38836°N 17.29834°E	21300000012884
	Hantverksföreningens byggnad	Penningen 7	1			62.39085°N 17.30434°E	21300000012880
	Hedbergska huset	Penningen 6	1			62.39092°N 17.30376°E	21300000012853
	Hirschska huset	Nyttan 3, 6	2			62.39089°N 17.30590°E	21300000012942
	Hotel Knaust	Proserpina 5 previously Proserpina 2, 4	1			62.39037°N 17.31117°E	21300000012881
	Hovrätten för Nedre Norrland	Hovrätten 2	2			62.39148°N 17.29401°E	21300000012941
	Malmströmska huset	Minerva 5	1			62.39069°N 17.31256°E	21300000012847
	Medborgarhuset Kusten i Stockvik	Dingersjö 1:67	1			62.34298°N 17.36161°E	21300000012829
	Nybygget Gudmundstjärn	Gudmundtjärn 1:1	19			62.66045°N 17.01628°E	21300000012828
	Ovansjöparken	Ovansjö 1:23	7			62.23910°N 17.39381°E	21300000012892
	Rahmska huset	Försöket 2	1			62.39130°N 17.30810°E	21300000012927
	Sundsvalls Central Station, with purlin roof	Östermalm 1:1, 3:1 - 3:2	6			62.38642°N 17.31527°E	21300000012840
	Sundsvalls teater	Kassören 1	1			62.38851°N 17.30821°E	21300000012915
	Sundsvallsbankens hus	Pan 5	1			62.39001°N 17.30910°E	21300000012917
	Tryckeribolagets hus	Vesta 3 previously Vesta 2	1			62.38954°N 17.30917°E	21300000012882
	Åsens sågverksanläggning	Åsen 1:4-5; Del av 1:25; Samfällighet	2			62.68902°N 16.75533°E	21300000012897

== Timrå Municipality ==
Image	Name	Premise	Number of buildings	Year built	Architect	Coordinates	ID
	Skeppshamns kapell	Åkerö 3:19	1			62.40396°N 17.72583°E	21300000012889

== Ånge Municipality ==
Image	Name	Premise	Number of buildings	Year built	Architect	Coordinates	ID
	Vikbron över Ljungan	Västerkomsta 5:117	1			62.49335°N 16.14066°E	21300000019859
	Ö	Ånge Ö 1:6	8			62.52023°N 15.99101°E	21300000012907

== Örnsköldsvik Municipality ==
placeholder
