= Swedish Armed Forces Logistics =

- Försvarsmaktens logistik
- Active: 2002–present
- Country: Sweden
- Allegiance: Swedish Armed Forces
- Branch: Tri-service
- Role: Military logistics
- Part of: Swedish Armed Forces Headquarters
- Garrison/HQ: Stockholm
- March: "Armé och Marin" (Berg) (Note: The march was established on 27 November 2002 through TFG 020006. It was used by the Mellersta underhållsregementet from 1994 to 2001.)

Commanders
- Current commander: BGen Lars O Jonsson

The Swedish Armed Forces Logistics (Swedish: Försvarsmaktens logistik, FMLOG) is a part of the Swedish Armed Forces, which is responsible for military logistics, maintenance and support for units, staffs and schools. The unit's activities can be divided into supply, transport, support for international operations and functional management.

== History ==
The Swedish Armed Forces Logistics (FMLOG) was established on 1 January 2002 from the remnants of the Maintenance Regiment (Underhållsregemente) organization. The stated main purpose was to bring about rationalizations and increased cost efficiency. An important task was to dismantle and reduce the anti invasion defence concept's (invasionsförsvar) extensive materiel and supply stock and adapt to new conditions. FMLOG was established as a joint resource of the Swedish Armed Forces for a number of differentiated activities that were not characterized as core activities, but as support. These activities are e.g. storage, transport, environmental activities, workshops, IS support, reserve equipment supply, military restaurants, procurement, travel administration, payroll and financial management and administrative support. At the start, FMLOG was divided into three divisions under the staff: Supply, Technology and Service. FMLOG's management and staff was located in Karlstad, the Supply Division's management was located in Boden, the Technology Division's management was in Arboga and the Service Division's management was in Karlskrona. The payroll and financial accounting was concentrated in five locations: Stockholm, Visby, Karlskrona, Karlsborg and Boden.

On 1 January 2005, the staff unit moved from Karlstad to Stockholm. In June 2012, the Riksdag decided that parts of FMLOG would be transferred to the Defence Materiel Administration (FMV) on 1 January 2013. The activities affected by the transfer were the main part of the procurement unit, the workshops and parts of the service office and the supply unit as well as parts of FMLOG's central management and staff function. The purpose was to create more efficient defense logistics within the framework of already existing agencies.

When the Swedish Armed Forces' focus became national operations and operational effect, the organization was transformed into the FMLOG war unit. Since then, virtually all personnel have received military training. In late 2010's FMLOG's role was instead in the rear logistics and in 2019 activities from the Defence Materiel Administration was added. These included central warehouses and stock, protected transports, dispatch, procurement, technical service and exchange units. FMLOG now also had the Swedish Armed Forces' Transport Office and Joint Service Support, the support for international operations remained. In addition, TVK-Log, a Technology and Maintenance Office, was added, which is the Swedish Armed Forces' expert competence in materiel and supplies as well as operational management of the Lift and Prio systems.

== Activities ==
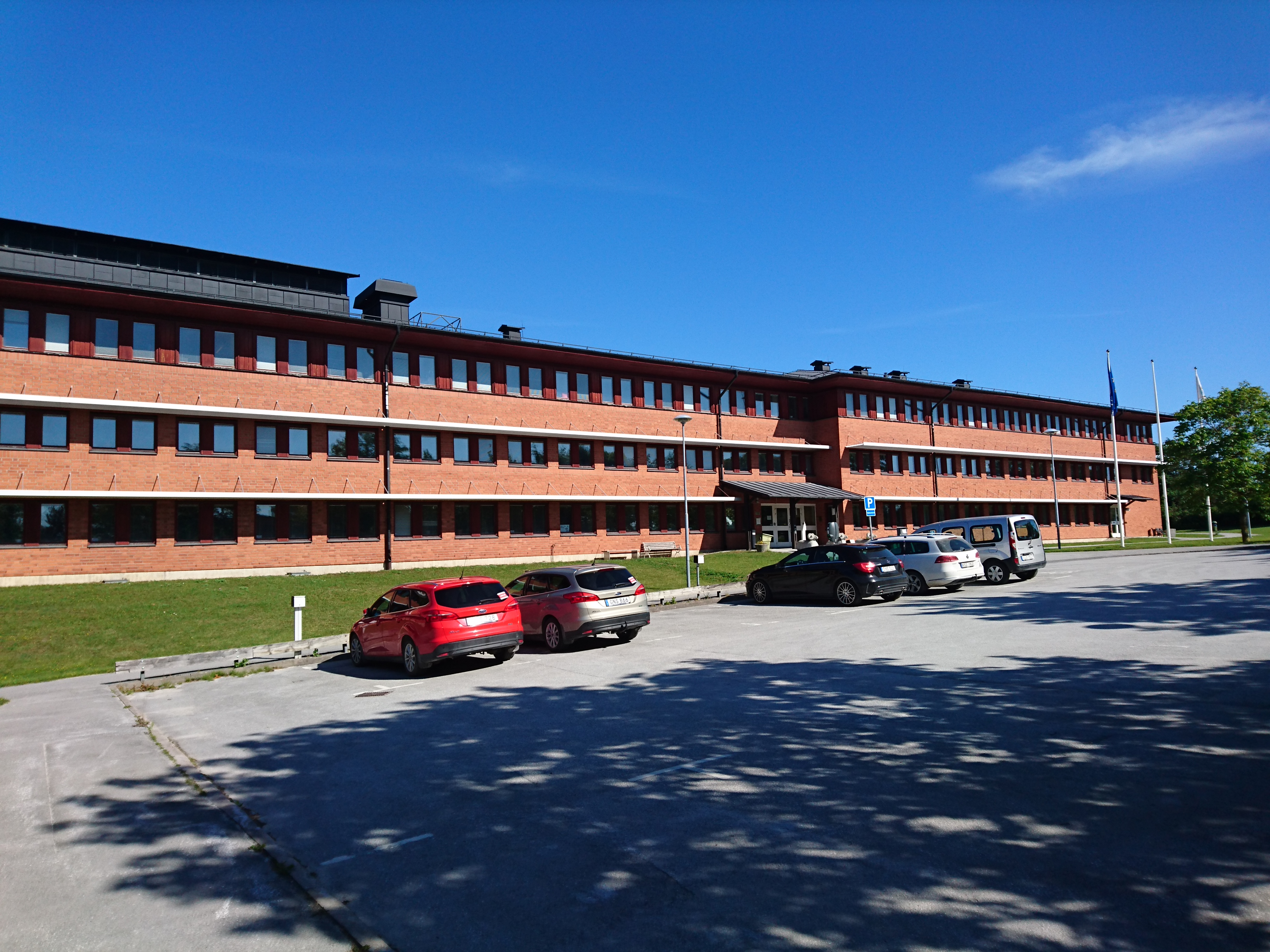
FMLOG in Visby.

The Swedish Armed Forces Logistics (FMLOG) is the Swedish Armed Forces' largest organizational unit. The task is to support operational activities, units, centers and schools by providing under its own auspices such maintenance and support activities that are unique to military activities. Other needs must be met primarily through procurement by commercial companies. FMLOG services and products are delivered at the agreed quality at the lowest possible cost. At the start in 2002, FMLOG had approximately 7,000 employees. Continuous reductions and production efficiencies have resulted in an organization that in 2011 comprised approximately 3,600 employees. The staff consists predominantly of employees based on civilian qualifications and professions, such as academics and technical specialists. A minority of the staff are officers. FMLOG had a turnover of approximately SEK 5.7 billion in 2010. The operations is revenue-financed with full cost coverage as a financial goal. FMLOG conducts operations in a large number of locations in and outside Sweden. FMLOG has the task of providing services in supplies, technical service, transport, IT support and general services (catering, finance and payroll administration, travel and hotel services, cleaning, postal and dispatch services, etc.) and is responsible for procuring mainly consumables and services to the Swedish defence. FMLOG delivers logistics to both main operations, production and operations, respectively.

== Commanding officers ==
=== Commanders ===
- 2002-02-01 – 2005-06-30: Major general Åke Jansson
- 2005-07-01 – 2009-08-31: Brigadier general Peter Wretman
- 2009-09-01 – 2010-11-30: Senior colonel Ulf Nordlander
- 2010-12-10 – 2011-03-31: Colonel Sven-Olof Broman (acting)
- 2011-04-01 – 2013-12-31: Colonel Mats Ström
- 2014-01-01 – 2016-05-26: Colonel Torgny Henryson
- 2016-05-26 – 2022-06-07: Colonel Olof Granander
- 2022-06-08 – 2025-08-31: Captain Mattias Svedin
- 2025-09-01 – 2025-12-31: Colonel Nils Johansson
- 2026-01-01 – 2026-06-30: Colonel Fredrik Gustafsson (acting)
- 2026-07-01 – present: Brigadier General Lars O Jonsson

=== Deputy commander ===
- 2026-01-01 – present: Colonel Fredrik Gustafsson

== Heraldry and traditions ==
=== Coat of arms ===
The coat of arms is used since 2001. Blazon: "Azure, a horse of eight legs rampant argent, mane, tail, hooves and flashes by the hooves or. The shield surmounting an erect sword, of the last colour".

=== Medals ===
In 2002, the Försvarsmaktens logistiks (FMLOG) förtjänstmedalj ("Swedish Armed Forces Logistics Medal of Merit") in silver (FMLOGSM) of the 8th size was established. Before 2002 the medal was called Försvarsmaktens underhållscentrums (FMUhC) förtjänstmedalj (UhCSM). The medal ribbon is of white moiré with blue edges and a black stripe on the middle.

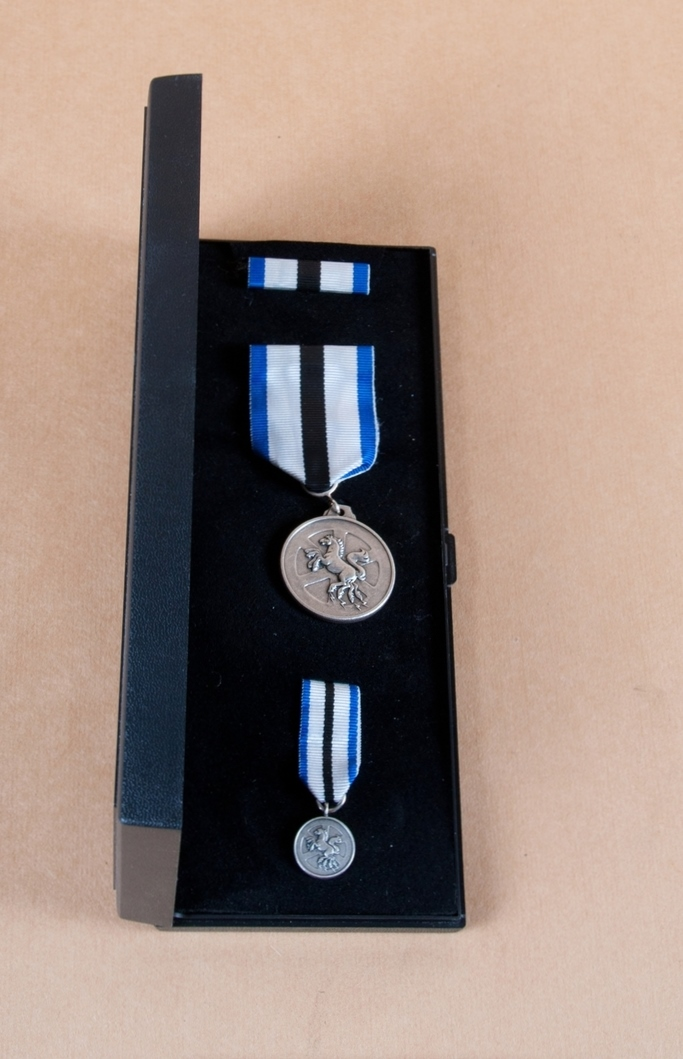
Medal and miniature medal

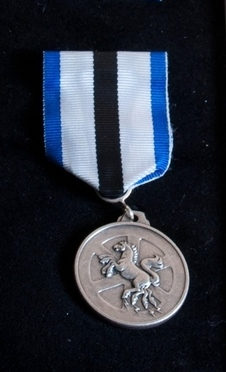
Medal

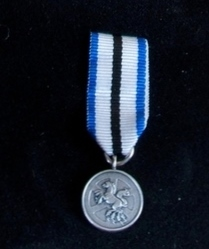
Miniature medal

=== Traditions ===
The unit carries traditions from the following unit: Försvarsmaktens underhållscentrum (FMUHC).

The unit preserves the memory of the following units: Södra underhållsregementet (UhregS), Mellersta underhållsregementet (UhregM), Norra underhållsregementet (UhregN) and the 1st Quartermaster Company (Första intendenturkompaniet, Int 1).

== Names, designations and locations ==
Name	Translation	From		To
Försvarsmaktens logistik	Swedish Armed Forces Logistics	2002-01-01	–	
Designation		From		To
FMLOG		2002-01-01	–	
Location		From		To
Karlstad Garrison		2002-01-01	–	2004-12-31
Stockholm Garrison		2005-01-01	–	
