= Jonas Haggren =

Swedish Navy officer

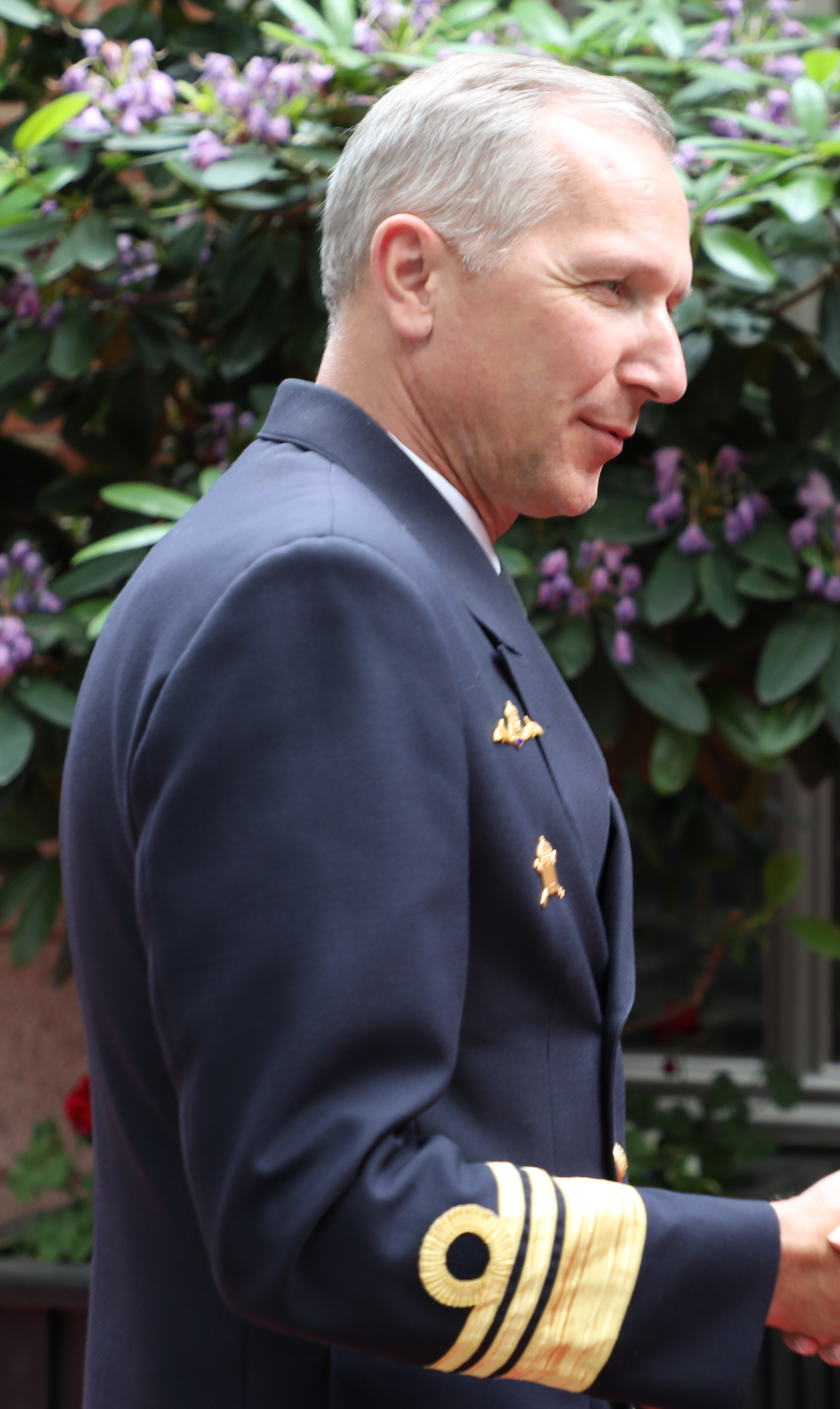
- Haggren in 2019
- Born: Jonas Björnson Haggren; 8 April 1964 (age 62); Stockholm, Sweden
- Military career
- Allegiance: Sweden
- Branch: Swedish Navy
- Service years: 1987–2026
- Rank: Vice Admiral
- Commands: HSwMS Uppland; HSwMS Gotland; 1st Submarine Flotilla; Operation Atalanta; Chief of Policy and Plans Department; Chief of Defence Staff; Swedish Armed Forces Headquarters; Swedish Armed Forces Special Forces; Commandant General in Stockholm

Vice Admiral Jonas Björnson Haggren (born 8 April 1964) is a retired Swedish Navy officer. He began his career as a submarine officer and later held a range of operational and staff positions within the Swedish Armed Forces. He served as commander of the 1st Submarine Flotilla and held senior positions in the Defence Staff, including Chief of Defence Staff and head of the Swedish Armed Forces Headquarters. In 2015, he served as Force Commander of the EU Naval Force's Operation Atalanta. From 2023 to 2026, he was Sweden's Military Representative to the EU and NATO in Brussels. In 2026, he succeeded Björn von Sydow as President of the Royal Swedish Academy of War Sciences.

== Career ==
Haggren attended the Swedish Navy Officers’ College (Marinens officershögskola, MOHS) from 1985 to 1987 when he received his commission as a naval officer and was promoted to acting sub-lieutenant. Haggren graduated from the Swedish Navy Staff College (Marinens krigshögskola, MKHS) in 1991. He then served in a variety of assignments on Västergötland and Gotland submarines from 1987 to 1995. In 1996, Haggren attended the Staff Officer Program at the Swedish National Defence College. Between 1996 and 1999, Haggren served as Executive Officer of HSwMS Uppland until he in 2000 was appointed commanding officer of HSwMS Uppland and HSwMS Gotland in which duty he stayed until 2001. Haggren passed the Management Program at the Swedish National Defence College from 2001 to 2002 and was promoted to commander.

In 2003, Haggren graduated from the Naval War College in the United States and from 2004 to 2005, he attended the International Course Security Policy at the Geneva Centre for Security Policy in Switzerland. Between 2002-2007 he was stationed at the Swedish Armed Forces Headquarters where he initially was responsible for military strategic planning regarding Swedish military deployment in Liberia (part of UNMIL) and the Democratic Republic of the Congo (part of MONUC). This period also included a 4 month tour at the Ministry of Defence as an advisor. On completion of the former task, Haggren worked with the European Capabilities Action Plan as part of the working group developing SOP's for the European Union Operational Headquarters (EU OHQ) and Force Headquarters (FHQ).

In 2006, he assumed the position of chief of staff of the 1st Submarine Flotilla in Karlskrona and in 2007 he was promoted to captain and assumed the position of commanding officer. In 2010 he was appointed head of the Naval Department Training and Procurement Staff (Produktionsledningens marinavdelning) and was at the same time promoted to rear admiral (lower half). After completion of his studies at the Royal College of Defence Studies in late summer 2014 Haggren was appointed to Force Commander 19th rotation between February and May 2015 in EU Naval Force (Operation Atalanta) in Somalia. On 13 February 2015, Haggren assumed command of Operation Atalanta's Force Headquarters (FHQ) during a ceremony held in Djibouti.

On the 28 November 2014, he was promoted to rear admiral and assumed duty as Chief of Policy and Plans Department in the Defence Staff in the Swedish Armed Forces Headquarters in Stockholm. On 20 September 2018, Haggren was promoted to vice admiral and appointed Chief of Defence Staff and head of the Swedish Armed Forces Headquarters, as well as commanding officer of the Swedish Armed Forces Special Forces.

Haggren was placed at the disposal of the Supreme Commander of the Swedish Armed Forces from 1 January 2023 until further notice, but until 1 September 2023 at the latest. From 1 July 2023, Haggren served as Sweden's Military Representative to the EU and NATO in Brussels. On 1 July 2026, he was succeeded by Lieutenant General Jonny Lindfors.

He succeeded Björn von Sydow as President of the Royal Swedish Academy of War Sciences in 2026.

== Personal life ==
Haggren married Linda Wennberg on 6 September 1997, in Bromma Church in Stockholm. They have three children.

== Dates of rank ==
- 1987 – Acting sub-lieutenant
- 1991 – Sub-lieutenant
- 1994 – Lieutenant
- 1997 – Lieutenant commander
- 2005 – Commander
- 2007 – Captain
- 2010 – Rear admiral (lower half)
- 2014 – Rear admiral
- 2018 – Vice admiral

== Awards and decorations ==
=== Swedish ===
- (Sweden) For Zealous and Devoted Service of the Realm
- (Sweden) Swedish Armed Forces Conscript Medal
- (Sweden) Swedish Armed Forces International Service Medal
- (Sweden) National Association of Naval Volunteer Corps Medal of Merit (Sjövärnskårernas Riksförbunds förtjänstmedalj)
- (Sweden) Swedish Navy League's Anchor of Honour (Föreningen Flottans Mäns hedersankare)
- (Sweden) Swedish Armed Forces Headquarters Medal of Merit (Högkvarterets förtjänstmedalj)

=== Foreign ===
- (France) Commander of the Ordre national du Mérite (1 September 2022)
- (European Union) European Security and Defence Policy Service Medal – EUNAVFOR ATALANTA

== Honours ==
- Member of the Royal Swedish Society of Naval Sciences (2008)
- Member of the Royal Swedish Academy of War Sciences (2011)

Military offices
Preceded by Gunnar Wieslander	1st Submarine Flotilla; 2007–2010	Succeeded by Fredrik Norrby
Preceded by Guido Rando	Force Commander of the EU Naval Force (Operation Atalanta); February 2015 – May 2015	Succeeded by Alfonso Gómez
Preceded by Dennis Gyllensporre	Chief of Policy and Plans Department; 2014–2018	Succeeded by Michael Claesson
Preceded by Dennis Gyllensporre	Chief of Defence Staff; 2018–2022	Succeeded by Michael Claesson as Chief of the Defence Staff
Preceded by Dennis Gyllensporre	Swedish Armed Forces Headquarters; 2018–2022	Succeeded by Michael Claesson
Preceded by Dennis Gyllensporre	Swedish Armed Forces Special Forces; 2018–2022	Succeeded by Incumbent
Preceded by Dennis Gyllensporre	Commandant General in Stockholm; 2018–2019	Succeeded by Jan Thörnqvist
Preceded by Jens Nykvist	Sweden's Military Representative to the EU and NATO; 2023–2026	Succeeded by Jonny Lindfors
Professional and academic associations
Preceded by Björn von Sydow	President of the Royal Swedish Academy of War Sciences; 2026–present	Succeeded by Incumbent
