= Jens Nykvist =

Swedish Navy officer (born 1968)

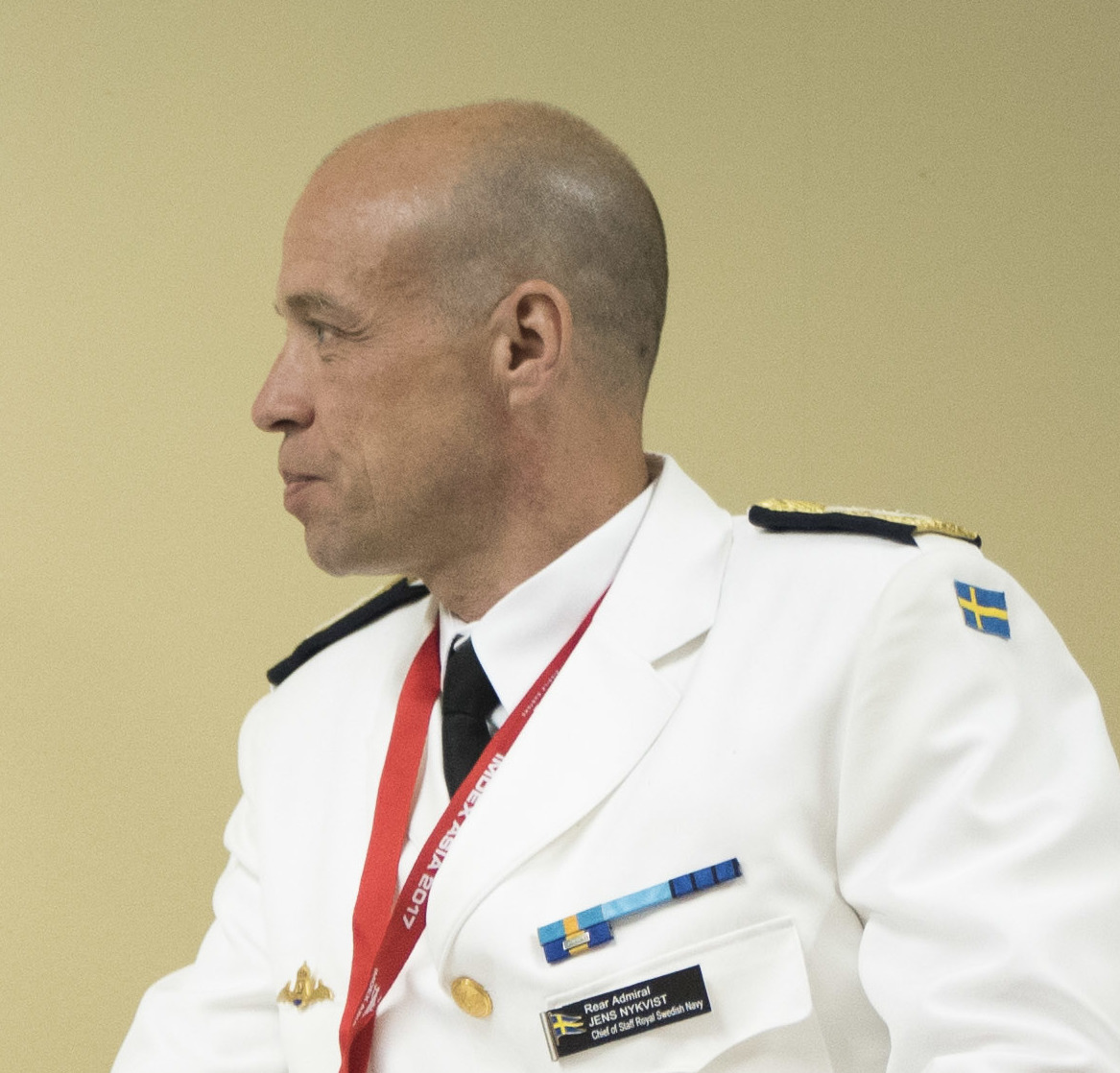
- Born: Jens Gunnar Peter Nykvist; 23 August 1968 (age 58); Stockholm, Sweden
- Military career
- Allegiance: Sweden
- Branch: Swedish Navy
- Service years: 1987–present
- Rank: Rear Admiral
- Commands: HSwMS Halland; HSwMS Gotland; 1st Submarine Flotilla; Maritime Component Command; Chief of Navy; Deputy Chief of the Defence Staff

Rear Admiral Jens Gunnar Peter Nykvist (born 23 August 1968) is a Swedish Navy officer. He currently serves as Deputy Chief of the Defence Staff from 1 July 2023. Prior to that, he served as commanding officer of the 1st Submarine Flotilla and the Maritime Component Command as well as Chief of Navy from 2016 to 2020.

== Early life ==
Nykvist was born on 23 August 1968 in Katarina Parish, Stockholm, Sweden. Nykvist did his military service at Berga Naval Base south of Stockholm in 1987 and began his career on the submarine HSwMS Sjöhästen in 1988.

== Career ==
Nykvist was commissioned as a naval officer in the Swedish Navy in 1991. From 1991 to 1994, Nykvist served as a command control officer on a Västergötland-class submarine and between 1994 and 1995 he served as a navigator on a submarine of the same class. Nykvist attended the basic course at the Navy War Academy in 1996 and then served as a communications officer on a Gotland-class submarine in 1997 and as a navigation officer in 1998. He then served as a teacher at the submarine school in 1999 and as an operations officer on a Gotland-class submarine from 2000 to 2001. Nykvist attended the staff course at the Swedish National Defence College from 2001 to 2002 and served as an executive officer on a Gotland-class submarine from 2002 to 2004. Nykvist served as a staff officer, S3 Operations, of the 1st Submarine Flotilla from 2004 to 2005.

Nykvist has been commanding officer of the submarines HSwMS Halland and HSwMS Gotland. Nykvist was stationed at the Naval Base Point Loma from 2005 to 2007 when the submarine HSwMS Gotland was leased by the United States Navy. There he served as Swedish liaison officer with the United States Third Fleet and commanding officer of HMS Gotland during the first year and as commander of the Swedish contingent in the United States during the second year. Back in Sweden, Nykvist attended the command course at the Swedish National Defence College in Stockholm from 2007 to 2009 and then served as chief of staff of the 1st Submarine Flotilla from 2009 to 2010. From December 2010 to April 2011, Nykvist served as acting commander of the 1st Submarine Flotilla and from April 2011 to December 2011 as its chief of staff.

From January 2012 to June 2012, Nykvist served in the Swedish Armed Forces Headquarters in Stockholm as Assistant Chief of Staff in the Joint Strategy and Operational Staff. He then attended the Naval Command College at the Naval War College in the United States from 2012 to 2013. He also attended the Salve Regina University in Newport, Rhode Island, USA between 2013 and 2014, receiving an MA in international relations. Nykvist served as head of naval operations at the J3 Department of the Joint Strategy and Operational Staff between August 2013 and November 2013. On 1 December 2013 he was promoted to captain and was appointed commanding officer of the 1st Submarine Flotilla. Nykvist was then the EU Naval Force Chief of Staff during Operation Atalanta in the Gulf of Aden from April until September 2015 and back in Sweden he continued being the commander of the 1st Submarine Flotilla until 2016. On 4 May 2016, Nykvist was appointed Chief of Navy and was promoted to rear admiral. He held the position for almost four years when he was succeeded by Rear Admiral Ewa Skoog Haslum on 1 February 2020. Nykvist is from 1 February 2020 posted to the Ministry of Defence. From September 2020, Nykvist served as Sweden's Military Representative to the EU and NATO in Brussels. In March 2022, Nykvist was appointed co-chair of the NATO Partner Interoperability Advocacy Group. Nykvist was placed as Sweden's Military Representative to the EU and NATO from 1 April 2023. Nykvist was appointed Deputy Chief of the Defence Staff from 1 July 2023.

== Personal life ==
Nykvist is married to Ulrika and together they have two children.

== Dates of rank ==
- 1991 – Acting sub-lieutenant
- ???? – Sub-lieutenant
- 1997 – Lieutenant
- 2002 – Lieutenant commander
- 2009 – Commander
- 2013 – Captain
- 2016 – Rear admiral

== Awards and decorations ==
=== Swedish ===
- (Sweden) For Zealous and Devoted Service of the Realm
- (Sweden) Swedish Armed Forces Conscript Medal
- (Sweden) Swedish Armed Forces International Service Medal
- (Sweden) Home Guard Silver Medal
- (Sweden) 1st Submarine Flotilla Medal of Merit

=== Foreign ===
- (France) Commander of the Ordre du Mérite Maritime (2019)
- (European Union) European Security and Defence Policy Service Medal – EUNAVFOR ATALANTA
- (Finland) Naval Cross of Merit (Merivoimien ansioristin)

== Honours ==
- Member of the Royal Swedish Society of Naval Sciences (2014)

Military offices
Preceded by Fredrik Norrby	1st Submarine Flotilla; 2013–2016	Succeeded by Mats Agnéus
Preceded by Jan Thörnqvist	Maritime Component Command; 2016–2018	Succeeded by None
Preceded by Jan Thörnqvist	Chief of Navy; 2016–2020	Succeeded by Ewa Skoog Haslum
Preceded by Thomas Nilsson	Sweden's Military Representative to the EU and NATO; 2020–2023	Succeeded by Jonas Haggren
Preceded by None	Deputy Chief of the Defence Staff; 2023–present	Succeeded by Incumbent
