= Dennis Gyllensporre =

Swedish Army officer

Dennis Gyllensporre KmstkSO
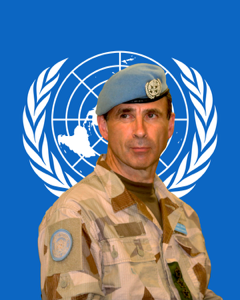
- Gyllensporre as commander of MINUSMA (2018–21).
- Born: Tage Dennis Öztürkmen; 14 July 1964 (age 62); Skellefteå, Sweden
- Military career
- Allegiance: Sweden
- Branch: Swedish Army
- Service years: 1987–2021
- Rank: Lieutenant General
- Commands: Chief of Policy and Plans Department; Chief of Defence Staff; Swedish Armed Forces Headquarters; Swedish Armed Forces Special Forces; Commandant General in Stockholm; MINUSMA
- Conflicts: Post-Bosnian War, Sudan, Afghanistan (ISAF), Northern Mali conflict

Lieutenant General (Ret.) Tage Dennis Gyllensporre KmstkSO (born Öztürkmen; 14 July 1964) is a Swedish military officer with extensive experience in defense planning, international operations, and strategic leadership. He was commissioned in 1987 and began his career at the Norrland Signal Regiment, later holding various command and staff positions within the Swedish Armed Forces, NATO, and the United Nations.

Gyllensporre served as Chief of Policy and Plans Department (2012–2014) and later as Chief of Defence Staff (2014–2018), where he also led the Swedish Armed Forces Headquarters and Special Forces. From 2018 to 2021, he was the Force Commander of the United Nations Multidimensional Integrated Stabilization Mission in Mali (MINUSMA). His international experience includes roles as a liaison officer in Bosnia and Herzegovina, Chief of Staff for ISAF's Regional Command North in Afghanistan, and staff assignments within the European Union and Swedish Ministry of Defence.

He has completed military education at institutions such as the United States Army Command and General Staff College and the National Defense University. In addition to his military career, he holds a PhD in policy analysis and governance and has been involved in academic research and teaching. Since 2022, he has been an associate professor at the Swedish Defence University and a visiting fellow at Pembroke College, Oxford. From 2025, he will serve as chairman of the Defence Innovation Accelerator for the North Atlantic (DIANA).

== Early life ==
Gyllensporre was born on 14 July 1964 in Skellefteå, Sweden, the son of Güray Öztürkmen, a school counselor, and his first wife Irene Johansson. He and two brothers took the name Gyllensporre. He attended the Royal Institute of Technology from 1985 to 1991 when he received a Master of Science in computer science.

== Career ==
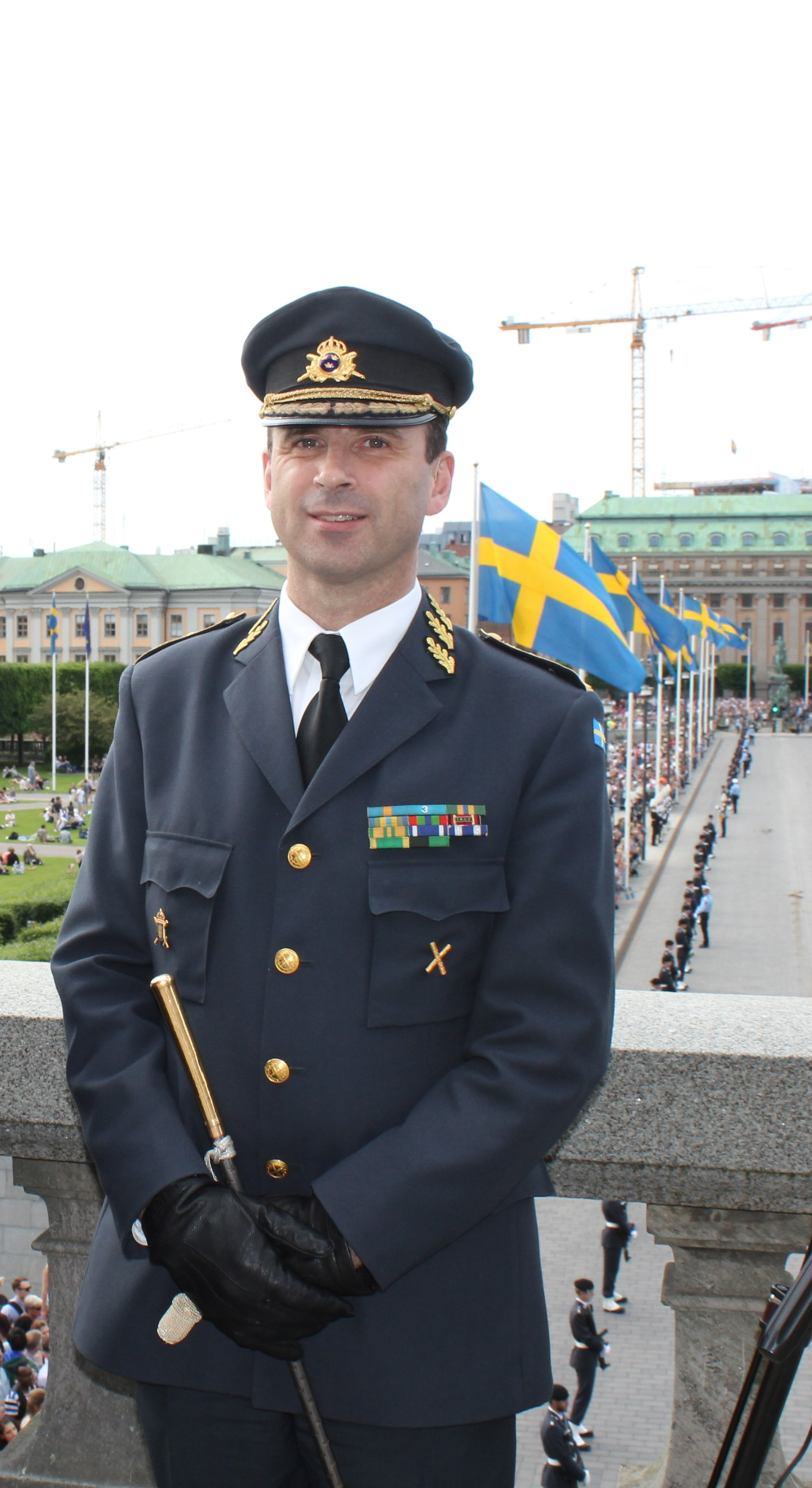
Gyllensporre in 2015.

Gyllensporre was commissioned as an officer in the Swedish Armed Forces in 1987 and was assigned to Norrland Signal Regiment (S 3) in Boden, where he served as platoon leader and company commander from 1987 to 1995. During this time Gyllensporre also studied at the Swedish National Defence College from 1993 to 1994 and from 1995 to 1997 and he attended the University of Warwick from 1994 to 1997 when he received a Master of Business Administration in Corporate Strategy. He then served as a Nordic-Polish Brigade Liaison Officer to the US Division Headquarters (SFOR) in Tuzla, Bosnia and Herzegovina from 1997 to 1998. Back in Sweden, Gyllensporre served as a Desk Officer for National and NATO/PfP Defence in the Planning Staff (J 5) at the Swedish Armed Forces Headquarters in Stockholm from 1998 to 2000.

He then attended the United States Army Command and General Staff College at Fort Leavenworth in the United States from 2000 to 2001 when he received a Master of Military Arts and Science and the Dwight D. Eisenhower Award as the top international graduate. Back in Sweden, Gyllensporre served as battalion commander, Headquarters Battalion, in the Norrbotten Regiment (I 19) in Boden from 2001 to 2002 and was then military advisor in Department for International and Security Affairs of the Ministry of Defence from 2001 to 2003. Gyllensporre served as Chief Operations Officer of the Joint Military Commission (JMC) in the Nuba Mountains, Sudan from 2003 to 2004 before returning to the Ministry of Defence in Stockholm the same year. In 2005 Gyllensporre passed the Joint and Combined Warfighting School (JCWS) at the Joint Forces Staff College, National Defense University in the United States. The same year he also served as Chief of Staff in the Joint Forces Command (OPIL) in Uppsala. Gyllensporre then served as Chief of Doctrine and Concepts Branch, Policy & Plans Division, European Union Military Staff in Brussels, Belgium from 2005 to 2008.

From January 2007 to November 2010, he attended the Maastricht Graduate School of Governance in Maastricht, Netherlands where he received a PhD in Policy Analysis and Governance. During this time Gyllensporre also served as Chief of Staff of the Regional Command North Headquarters of the International Security Assistance Force (ISAF) in Mazar-i-Sharif, Afghanistan in 2008. Also in 2008, he was appointed Chief of Staff of the Defence Staff (Ledningsstabens stabschef, LEDS SC) in the Swedish Armed Forces Headquarters in Stockholm. In 2010 he left the position and was appointed Director Future Capabilities in the Defence Staff (Ledningsstabens utvecklingsavdelning) in the Swedish Armed Forces Headquarters, Stockholm. In 2011, he attended the Defense Resources Management Institute at the Naval Postgraduate School in the United States. From 2012 to 2014, Gyllensporre served as military advisor in the Swedish Parliamentary Defence Commission (Försvarsberedningen) as well as Chief of Policy and Plans Department in the Swedish Armed Forces Headquarters in Stockholm. On 27 November 2014, Gyllensporre was appointed Chief of Defence Staff. In this position he is also the head of the Swedish Armed Forces Headquarters, head of the Swedish Armed Forces Special Forces and the Commandant General in Stockholm. In 2017 Gyllensporre was introduced to the U.S. Army Command and General Staff College Hall of Fame.

In August 2018 he was appointed by the UN Secretary-General as Force Commander of the United Nations Multidimensional Integrated Stabilization Mission in Mali (MINUSMA). Gyllensporre assumed the position on 1 October 2018. In 2019 the UN Secretary-General extended the appointment one more year, until October 2020. In 2020 the UN Secretary-General made a second extension of the appointment one more year, until October 2021. Gyllensporre is an associate professor of the Swedish Defence University from January 2022 and Visiting Fellow of Pembroke College, Oxford (2023–24). From 1 January 2025, he will serve as chairman of the board of the Defence Innovation Accelerator for the North Atlantic (DIANA).

== Personal life ==
In 1992 he married Helena Nordgren (born 1965). They have three children (born 1991, 1993 and 1997).

== Dates of rank ==
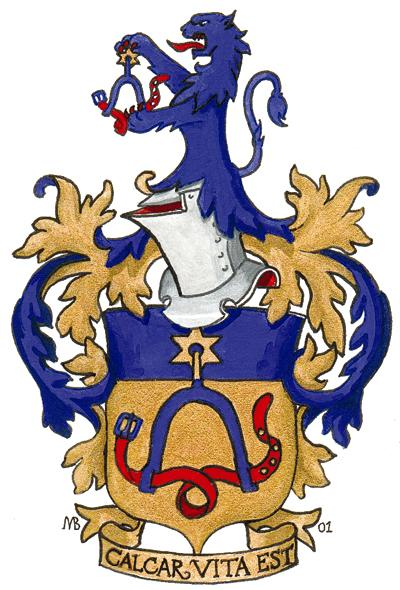
Gyllensporre family coat of arms.

- 1987 – Second lieutenant
- 1988 – Lieutenant
- 1991 – Captain
- 1994 – Major
- 2000 – Lieutenant colonel
- 2005 – Colonel
- 2010 – Brigadier general
- 2012 – Major general
- 2014 – Lieutenant general

== Awards and decorations ==
=== Swedish ===
- (Sweden) Royal Order of the Sword, Commander Grand Cross (KmstkSO, 21 March 2024)
- (Sweden) King Carl XVI Gustaf's Jubilee Commemorative Medal III (30 April 2016)
- (Sweden) For Zealous and Devoted Service of the Realm
- (Sweden) Swedish Armed Forces Medal of Merit
- (Sweden) Swedish Armed Forces Conscript Medal
- (Sweden) Swedish Armed Forces International Service Medal
- (Sweden) Swedish Armed Forces Headquarters Medal of Merit (Högkvarterets förtjänstmedalj)
- (Sweden) Commandant General in Stockholm Medal of Merit (Överkommendanten i Stockholms förtjänstmedalj)
- (Sweden) Swedish Reserve Officers Federation Merit Badge (Förbundet Sveriges Reservofficerares förtjänsttecken)
- (Sweden) Norrland Signal Battalion Medal of Merit (Norrlands signalbataljons förtjänstmedalj)
- (Sweden) Norrland Signal Battalion Commemorative Medal (Norrlands signalbataljons minnesmedalj)

=== Foreign ===
- (Germany) German Armed Forces Deployment Medal, ISAF, Afghanistan.
- (France) Officer of the Legion of Honour (17 October 2021)
- Officer of the National Order of Mali
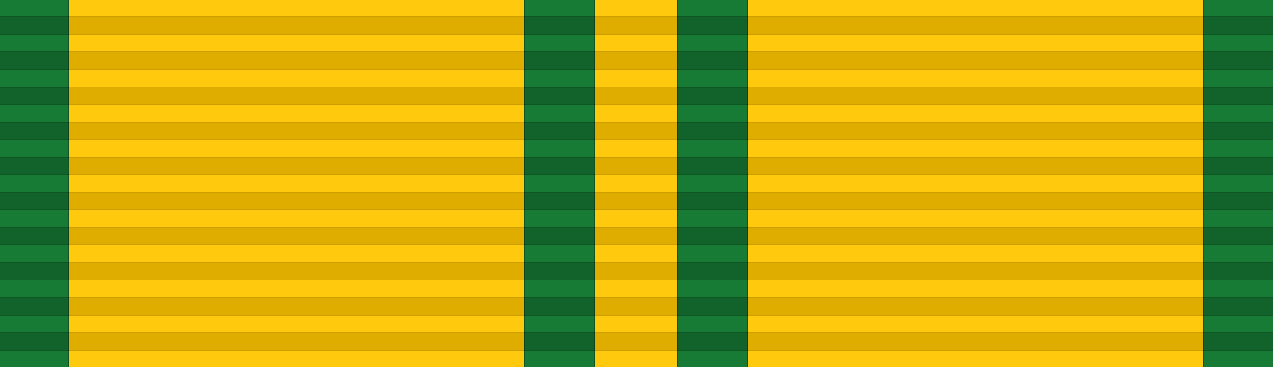
- (Netherlands) Cross for the Four Day Marches
- NATO Medal for the former Yugoslavia
- Joint Military Commission (JMC) Monitor Medal for the Nuba Mountains in Sudan
- NATO Non-Article 5 medal
- United Nations Medal (MINUSMA), award numeral 6

etc

== Civilian/military academic merits ==
- Executive Certificate, Harvard University, United States (2017)
- Associate Professor (Docent), Swedish Defence University (2015-), Sweden
- Military non-credit studies, Naval Postgraduate School, United States (2011)
- Doctor of Philosophy, Governance and Policy Analysis Dual Career Programme (2007–2010), Maastricht Graduate School of Governance, Maastricht University, Netherlands
- Military non-credit studies, National Defense University, United States (2005)
- Master of Arts, United States Army Command and General Staff College (2000–2001)
- Military non-credit studies, Swedish National Defence College (1995–1997)
- Master of Business Administration (MBA), Warwick Business School, University of Warwick, United Kingdom (1994–1998)
- Military non-credit studies, Swedish National Defence College (1993–1994)
- Master of Science in Computer Science and Engineering (1985–1991), KTH Royal Institute of Technology, Sweden

== Honours ==
- Dwight D. Eisenhower Award as top international graduate of the CGSC (2001)
- Member of the Royal Swedish Academy of War Sciences (2011)
- Member of the International Hall of Fame, United States Army Command and General Staff College (CGSC) (2017)
- Leader of Change (Årets Förändringsledare) (2022)
- Member of the International Hall of Fame, National Defense University (2022)
- Vice President of the Royal Swedish Academy of War Sciences (2022–present)

== Bibliography ==
=== Books ===
- Edström, Håkan; Gyllensporre, Dennis; Westberg, Jacob (2019). Military strategy of small states: responding to external shocks of the 21st century. Cass military studies. Abingdon, Oxon: Routledge. ISBN 9781138483644. SELIBR cmk4n9sb9bf41dfj.
- Edström, Håkan; Gyllensporre, Dennis, eds. (2014). Alike or different?: Scandinavian approaches to military interventions. Stockholm: Santérus Academic Press. ISBN 9789173350396. SELIBR 16478804.
- Edström, Håkan; Gyllensporre, Dennis, eds. (2014). Svensk försvarsdoktrin efter kalla kriget: förlorade decennier eller vunna insikter? (in Swedish). Stockholm: Santérus Academic Press. ISBN 9789173350389. SELIBR 16478839.
- Edström, Håkan; Gyllensporre, Dennis (2013). Political aspirations and perils of security: unpacking the military strategy of the United Nations. New security challenges series. Basingstoke: Palgrave Macmillan. ISBN 978-1-137-00871-8. SELIBR 3914683.
- Edström, Håkan; Gyllensporre, Dennis, eds. (2012). Pursuing strategy: NATO operations from the Gulf War to Gaddafi. New security challenges series. Basingstoke: Palgrave Macmillan. ISBN 978-0-230-29280-2. SELIBR 12458796.
- Gyllensporre, Dennis (2012). Adding Nonlinear Tools to the Strategist's Toolbox. Biblioscholar. ISBN 978-1249403630.
- Gyllensporre, Dennis (2010). Competing and Complementary Perspectives on the EU as a Crisis Management Actor: An Examination of the Common Security and Defence Policy Through the Lenses of Idealism and Realism. Maastricht: Boekenplan. ISBN 9789086661725.

=== Articles ===
- ”Decision Navigation: Coping With 21st-Century Challenges in Tactical Decision-making”. Military Review 83 (5): pp. 20–31. 2003. ISSN 0026-4148 .
- ”L’evolution de la Doctrine Militaire de l’UE”. Défense Nationale et Sécurité Collective 64 (2): pp. 73–81. 2008. ISSN 1950-3253.
- ”International Legality, the Use of Military Force, and Burdens of Persuasion: Self-Defense, the Initiation of Hostilities, and the Impact of the Choice Between Two Evils on the Perception of International Legitimacy”. Pace Law Review 20 (2): pp. 484–543. 2010. ISSN 0272-2410.
- ”Militära reflektioner om officersprofessionen”. Kungliga Krigsvetenskapsakademiens Handlingar och Tidskrift (1.häftet): pp. 23–33. 2014. ISSN 0023-5369.
- ”How much is enough? An examination of military strategic planning at the Swedish Armed Forces”. Kungliga Krigsvetenskapsakademiens Handlingar och Tidskrift (2.häftet): pp. 6–27. 2014. ISSN 0023-5369.
- ”Observing War – Keeping Peace? Unpacking the Military Strategy of UN Non-Force Missions”. Journal of International Peacekeeping 18 (3-4): pp. 290–317. 2014. ISSN 1875-4104.
- ”Minding the Gap between Words and Deeds: Towards a New EU Strategy on Security”. European Foreign Affairs Review 20 (1): pp. 3–22. 2015. ISSN 1384-6299.
- ”On the future of conventional warfare: From closed minds to open systems”. Kungliga Krigsvetenskapsakademiens Handlingar och Tidskrift (4.häftet): pp. 136–147. 2015. ISSN 0023-5369.

Military offices
| Preceded by None | Chief of Policy and Plans Department; 2012–2014 | Succeeded by Jonas Haggren |
| Preceded by Jan Salestrand | Chief of Defence Staff; 2014–2018 | Succeeded by Jonas Haggren |
| Preceded by Jan Salestrand | Swedish Armed Forces Headquarters; 2014–2018 | Succeeded by Jonas Haggren |
| Preceded by Jan Salestrand | Swedish Armed Forces Special Forces; 2014–2018 | Succeeded by Jonas Haggren |
| Preceded by Jan Salestrand | Commandant General in Stockholm; 2014–2018 | Succeeded by Jonas Haggren |
| Preceded by Jean-Paul Deconinck | Force Commander of MINUSMA; 1 October 2018–2021 | Succeeded by Cornelis Johannes Matthijssen |
