= 1st Submarine Flotilla (Sweden) =

Swedish naval unit

Coordinates: 56.152056°N 15.169556°E

- Första ubåtsflottiljen
- Active: 1904–present
- Country: Sweden
- Allegiance: Swedish Armed Forces
- Branch: Swedish Navy
- Type: Submarine
- Size: Flotilla (350 personnel)
- Part of: Swedish Armed Forces Headquarters (Note: The unit has been subordinate to the following commands: Coastal Fleet (1904–1997), Middle Military District (1998–2000), Joint Forces Command (2000–2005), and the Swedish Armed Forces Headquarters (2005–present).)
- Garrison/HQ: Karlskrona Naval Base
- Motto: Esse non videre ("To be without being seen") (Note: Inherited the motto from the HSwMS Sjöormen (Sor) which used it from 1967 to 1994.)
- March: "Fladdrande Fanor" (V. Widqvist) (Note: The march was inherited from the Submarine Service (Ubåtsvapnet) and was established on 27 November 2002.)
- Website: Official website

Commanders
- Current commander: Captain (N) Paula Wallenburg

Insignia
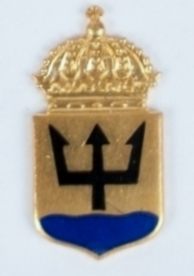
- Cufflink

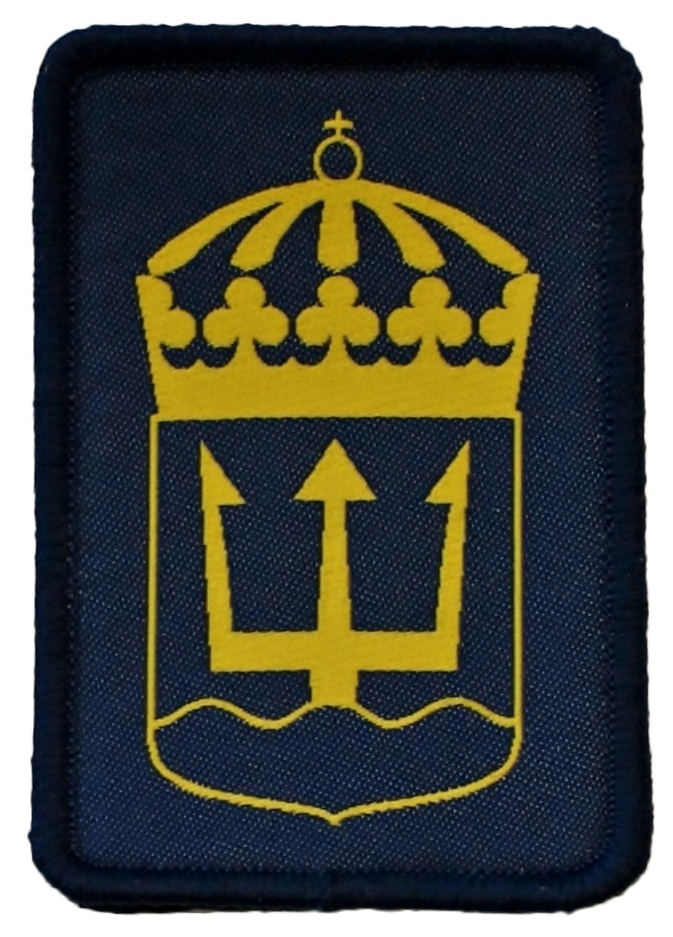
- Shoulder sleeve insignia

The 1st Submarine Flotilla (Swedish: Första ubåtsflottiljen, 1. ubflj) is a submarine unit of the Swedish Fleet, established in 1901 and based at the Karlskrona Naval Base within the Karlskrona Garrison in Karlskrona, Blekinge County. The flotilla shares its location with the 3rd Naval Warfare Flotilla.

== History ==
The first form of the flotilla was established in 1904 as unit subordinate to the Coastal Fleet, following the creation of the Swedish Navy's submarine force with the arrival of its first submarine, Hajen. In 1918 the unit was formally named the 1st Submarine Division (1. undervattensbåtsdivisionen). By 1934, it had expanded into a three-division unit, now named the Submarine Department (Ubåtsavdelningen). In 1951, the unit was assigned its current name, and was part of the Coastal Fleet as the 1st Submarine Flotilla. During the 1970s, the Navy Diving School (Flottans dykarskola) was added to the flotilla, which later formed the Diving Division (Dykdivisionen), which included submarine rescue ships.

On 1 July 1994, the flotilla was organized as the First Submarine Department (Första ubåtsavdelningen, 1. UbA). This was due to all units within the Swedish Armed Forces being cadre-organized and receiving permanent structures. On 1 January 1998, the flotilla was given its current name, the 1st Submarine Flotilla (Första ubåtsflottiljen, 1. ubflj). According to the Defence Act of 2004, it was decided that the flotilla and its staff would be relocated from Hårsfjärden to Karlskrona. As of 1 January 2005, the flotilla has been based at the Karlskrona Naval Base.

== Organization ==
See below the composite of the submarine force at different time points. During the 1930s, the submarine force was included in the Winter Squadron (Vintereskadern), which was the equipped part of the Swedish Navy during winter time. Parts of the submarine force were included in the Gothenburg Squadron and the Karlskrona Department (Karlskronaavdelningen) during World War II.

Year	Name	Division	Ships
1918	1. undervattensbåtsdivisionen		Delfinen, Skäggald, Svärdfisken, Tumlaren
1934	Ubåtsavdelningen	Depådivision	Svea
1934	Ubåtsavdelningen	1. ubåtsdivisionen	Draken, Gripen, Ulven
1934	Ubåtsavdelningen	2. ubåtsdivisionen	Bävern, Illern, Uttern
1934	Ubåtsavdelningen	3. ubåtsdivisionen	Hajen, Sälen
1940	Ubåtsavdelningen	Depådivision	Svea
1940	Ubåtsavdelningen	1. ubåtsdivisionen	Draken, Gripen, Ulven
1940	Ubåtsavdelningen	2. ubåtsdivisionen	Sjöbjörnen, Sjöhunden, Sjölejonet
1940	Ubåtsavdelningen	3. ubåtsdivisionen	Delfinen, Najad, Springaren
1945	Ubåtsavdelningen		SS Patricia, Belos
1945	Ubåtsavdelningen	1. ubåtsdivisionen	Sjöborren, Sjöhästen, Sjöormen
1945	Ubåtsavdelningen	7. ubåtsdivisionen	Najad, Neptun, Näcken
1945	Ubåtsavdelningen	12. ubåtsdivisionen	U4, U5, U6
1951	1. ubåtsflottiljen		SS Patricia, Belos
1951	1. ubåtsflottiljen	1. ubåtsdivisionen	Neptun, Sjöborren, Sjöhunden
1951	1. ubåtsflottiljen	2. ubåtsdivisionen	Dykaren, Nordkaparen, Näcken, Sjöormen, Tumlaren
1975	1. ubåtsflottiljen		Belos, Älvsborg
1975	1. ubåtsflottiljen	1. ubåtsdivisionen	Sjöhästen, Vargen
1975	1. ubåtsflottiljen	3. ubåtsdivisionen	Delfinen, Draken, Gripen, Hajen, Sjöormen
1989	1. ubåtsflottiljen	1. ubåtsdivisionen	Sjöbjörnen, Sjöhästen, Sjölejonet, Sjöormen, Hälsingland, Södermanland, Västergötland, Östergötland
1989	1. ubåtsflottiljen	2. ubåtsdivisionen	Najad, Neptun, Näcken, Sjöhunden
1989	1. ubåtsflottiljen	Dykdivisionen	Belos
1998	1. ubåtsflottiljen	1. ubåtsdivisionen	Gotland, Halland, Uppland, Södermanland, Östergötland, Hälsingland, Västergötland
1998	1. ubåtsflottiljen	2. ubåtsdivisionen	Najad, Näcken
1998	1. ubåtsflottiljen	Dykdivisionen	Belos, URF
1998	1. ubåtsflottiljen	Torpedbärgningsdivisionen	Pelikanen, Pingvinen
2013	1.ubåtsflottiljen		Gotland, Halland, Uppland, Södermanland, Östergötland
2021	1.ubåtsflottiljen		Gotland, Halland, Uppland, Södermanland

== Heraldry and traditions ==
=== Coat of arms ===
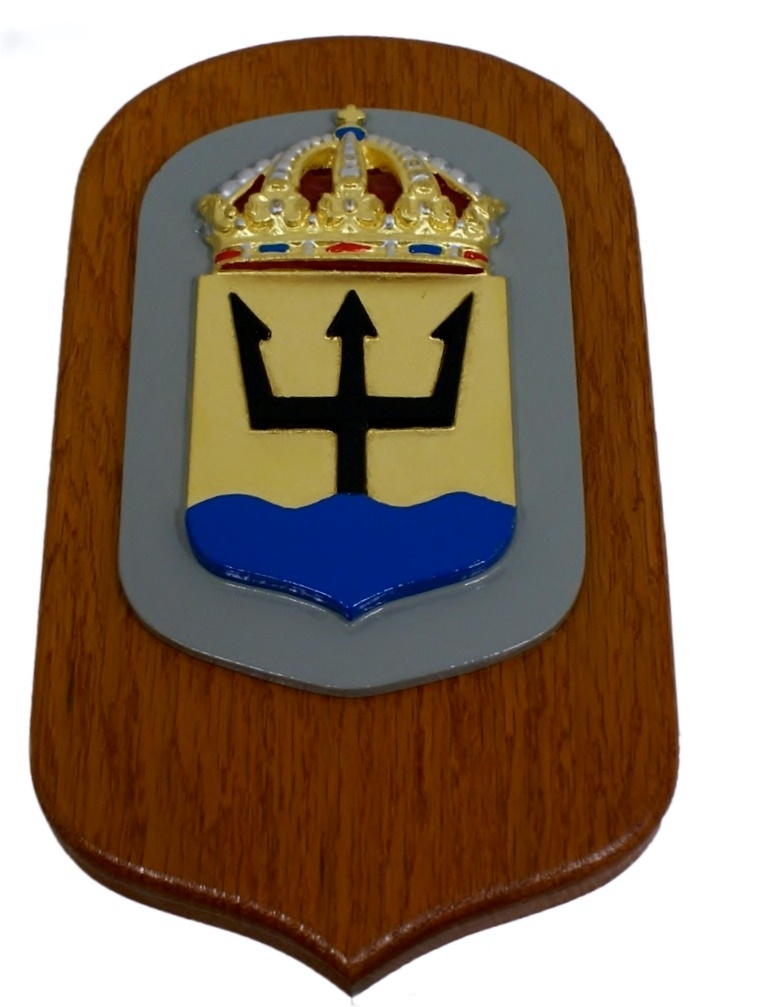
Coat of arms in metal mounted on varnished wooden plate.

The coat of arms of the 1st Submarine Division (Första ubåtsavdelningen) 1994–1998 and the 1st Submarine Flotilla since 1998. Blazon: "Or, from a wavy base azure a trident issuant sable".

=== Flag ===
The flag is a double swallow-tailed Swedish flag. It was presented to the then 1st Submarine Division by the Supreme Commander, General Owe Wiktorin at the Artillery Yard in Stockholm on 30 April 1996.

== Commanding officers ==
- 1951–1951: Lieutenant Commander Åke Lindemalm
- 1951–1952: Lieutenant Commander Gustav Lindgren
- 1952–1964: ?
- 1964–1965: Commander Rolf Rheborg
- 1966–1969: Captain Hans Petrelius
- 1969–1971: Captain Rolf Skedelius
- 1971–1972: Captain Bengt Rasin
- 1973–1976: Captain Jan Enquist
- 1976–1978: Captain Bror Stefenson
- 1978–1981: Captain Bertil Daggfeldt
- 1981–1983: Captain Roderick Klintebo
- 1983–1987: Captain Sten Swedlund
- 1987–1994: ?
- 1994–1997: Captain Bertil Björkman
- 1997–2000: Captain Curt Lundgren
- 2000–2003: Captain Bo Rask
- 2004–2006: Captain Anders Järn
- 2006–2007: Captain Gunnar Wieslander
- 2007–2010: Captain Jonas Haggren
- 2010–2013: Captain Fredrik Norrby
- 2013–2016: Captain Jens Nykvist
- 2016–2016: Lieutenant Commander Stefan Östrand (acting)
- 2016–2020: Captain Mats Agnéus
- 2020–2023: Captain Fredrik Lindén
- 2023–present: Captain Paula Wallenburg

== Names, designations and locations ==
Name	Translation	From		To
1. undervattensbåtsdivisionen		1918-??-??	–	1934-??-??
Ubåtsavdelningen	Submarine Division	1934-??-??	–	1951-??-??
1. ubåtsflottiljen	1st Submarine Flotilla	1951-??-??	–	1994-06-30
1. ubåtsavdelningen	1st Submarine Division	1994-07-01	–	1997-12-31
1. ubåtsflottiljen	1st Submarine Flotilla	1998-01-01	–	
Designation		From		To
1. ubflj		1951-??-??	–	1994-06-30
1. UbA		1994-07-01	–	1997-12-31
1. ubflj		1998-01-01	–	
Location		From		To
Muskö Naval Base		1969-09-30	–	2005-08-31
Karlskrona Naval Base		2005-09-01	–	
