= Chief of Defence Staff (Sweden) =

Formerly chief of the Defence Staff at the Swedish Armed Forces Headquarters

- Chefen för ledningsstaben
- Swedish Armed Forces
- Type: Chief of Defence Staff
- Abbreviation: C LEDS
- Member of: Defence Board
- Reports to: Supreme Commander of the Swedish Armed Forces
- Seat: Swedish Armed Forces Headquarters, Lidingövägen 24, Stockholm
- Term length: No fixed term
- Constituting instrument: FFS 2007:4, Chapter 2 FFS 2013:4, Chapter 8 FFS 2016:2, Chapter 8 FIB 2020:5, Chapter 8
- Precursor: Chief of the Defence Staff
- Formation: 1 April 2007
- First holder: Lieutenant General Mats Nilsson
- Final holder: Vice Admiral Jonas Haggren
- Abolished: 31 December 2022
- Succession: Chief of the Defence Staff
- Unofficial names: Ledningsstabschef
- Deputy: Deputy Chief of Defence Staff (Note: The Chief Financial Officer (CFO) and Head of Plans and Finance was also the Deputy Chief of Defence Staff.)

The Chief of Defence Staff (Swedish: Chefen för ledningsstaben, C LEDS lit. 'Chief of the Management Staff') was the chief of the Defence Staff at the Swedish Armed Forces Headquarters. The Chief of Defence Staff was appointed as a three-star general or admiral. The Chief of Defence Staff was part of the Defence Board (Försvarsmaktsledningen, FML), a group of the Supreme Commander's top commanders. The position was abolished in 2022 and was succeeded by the new old position of Chief of the Defence Staff which previously existed between 1937 and 1994.

== Organisation ==
At the Swedish Armed Forces Headquarters's reorganization on 1 April 2007, the Defence Staff (Ledningsstaben, LEDS) (Note: Not to be confused with the Defence Staff which existed from 1937 to 1994.) was created. It handles major strategic issues, such as planning the Swedish Armed Forces' operations and financial control of the agency. The staff leads, coordinates and monitors the activities of the Swedish Armed Forces Headquarters. The Defence Staff was in turn divided into departments with different responsibilities. The departments are:

- Plans and Finance Department (Planerings- och ekonomiavdelningen, LEDS PLANEK)
- Policy and Plans Department (Inriktningsavdelning, LEDS INRI), headed by the Chief of Policy and Plans Department
- Communications Department (Kommunikationsavdelningen, LEDS KOMM), headed by the Director of Communication and Public Affairs
- Chief Information Officer Department (CIO-avdelningen, LEDS CIO)
- Legal Department (Juridiska avdelningen, LEDS JUR)
- Human Resources Department (Personalavdelningen, LEDS PERS), headed by the Director of Human Resources
- Total Defence Department (Totalförsvarsavdelningen, LEDS TF).

In addition, there was a staff department for coordination and support to the agency's management. The Chief of Defence Staff was also head of the headquarters. The Chief of Defence Staff had extensive duties and powers, for example with regard to international cooperation and international agreements. The Chief of Defence Staff had, in his support, a deputy head of the headquarters and the administrative headquarters department.

The Chief of Defence Staff reported directly to the Supreme Commander of the Swedish Armed Forces and the chief financial officer of the Swedish Armed Forces reports to the Chief of Defence Staff.

== Chiefs of Defence Staff ==
No.	Portrait	Chief of Defence Staff	Took office	Left office	Time in office	Defence branch	Supreme Commander	Ref.
1	Mats Nilsson	Lieutenant general Mats Nilsson (born 1956)	1 April 2007	31 October 2007	213 days	Air Force	Håkan Syrén	-
2	Sverker Göranson	Lieutenant general Sverker Göranson (born 1954)	1 November 2007	2009	1–2 years	Army	Håkan Syrén	
3	Jan Salestrand	Lieutenant general Jan Salestrand (born 1954)	7 May 2009	7 October 2014	5 years, 153 days	Air Force	Sverker Göranson	
-	Helena Holmstedt	Helena Holmstedt (born 1960); Acting	8 October 2014	26 November 2014	49 days	-	Sverker Göranson	
4	Dennis Gyllensporre	Lieutenant general Dennis Gyllensporre (born 1964)	27 November 2014	3 October 2018 (Note: The Swedish Armed Forces decided on leave of absence for Gyllensporre during the period 3 October 2018 until further notice. Gyllensporre was employed by the United Nations as Force Commander for MINUSMA and was thus was no longer placed as Chief of Defence Staff.)	3 years, 310 days	Army	Sverker Göranson; Micael Bydén	
5	Jonas Haggren	Vice admiral Jonas Haggren (born 1964)	20 September 2018	31 December 2022	4 years, 102 days	Navy	Micael Bydén	

== Deputy Chiefs of Defence Staff ==
No.	Portrait	Deputy Chief of Defence Staff	Took office	Left office	Time in office	Prime Minister	Ref.
1	Helena Holmstedt	Helena Holmstedt (born 1960)	1 April 2007	31 December 2022	15 years, 274 days	Micael Bydén	-
