= United Nations Multidimensional Integrated Stabilization Mission in Mali =

Peacekeeping force in Mali after the Tuareg rebellion of 2012

- Abbreviation: MINUSMA
- Formation: 25 April 2013
- Dissolved: 30 June 2023
- Type: Peacekeeping mission
- Legal status: Dissolved
- Headquarters: Bamako, Mali
- Special Representatives of the Secretary-general (SRSGs) and Heads of MINUSMA: Bert Koenders (July 2013 – October 2014); Mongi Hamdi (January 2014 - December 2014); Mahamat Saleh Annadif (December 2015 – April 2021); El-Ghassim Wane (April 2021 - December 2023)
- Parent organization: United Nations Security Council
- Website: Official website in English

The United Nations Multidimensional Integrated Stabilization Mission in Mali (French: Mission multidimensionnelle intégrée des Nations Unies pour la stabilisation au Mali, MINUSMA) was a United Nations peacekeeping mission in Mali. MINUSMA was established on 25 April 2013 by United Nations Security Council Resolution 2100 to stabilise the country after the Tuareg rebellion of 2012, and was terminated over a decade later on 30 June 2023. Officially deployed on 1 July 2013, MINUSMA was the UN's deadliest peacekeeping mission. While UNIFIL, the mission in Lebanon, has lost more peacekeepers overall, by incident type the majority of those deaths at 135 are officially listed as "accidents." At 175 deaths by "malicious act," MINUSMA was officially the deadliest Peacekeeping mission of all time.

During MINUSMA's existence, there were two further international peace operations in Mali. These were the European Union missions EUCAP Sahel Mali and EUTM Mali.

== History ==
In 2012, Tuareg and other peoples in northern Mali's Azawad region started an insurgency in the north under the banner of the National Movement for the Liberation of Azawad. After some initial successes and complaints from the Malian Army that it was ill-equipped to fight the insurgents, who had benefited from an influx of heavy weaponry from the 2011 Libyan civil war as well as other sources, elements of the army staged a military coup d'état on 21 March 2012. Following the coup, the rebels made further advances to capture the three biggest cities in the north: Gao, Timbuktu and Kidal. Following economic sanctions and a blockade by the Economic Community of West African States (ECOWAS) on the country, a deal, brokered in Burkina Faso by President Blaise Compaoré under the auspices of ECOWAS, was signed that would see Amadou Sanogo cede power to Dioncounda Traoré to assume the presidency in an interim capacity until an election is held.

On 1 July 2013, 6,000 of a future total of 12,600 UN peacekeeping troops officially took over responsibility for patrolling the country's north from France and the ECOWAS' International Support Mission to Mali (AFISMA). The group was expected to play a role in the 2013 Malian presidential election. The force was the third largest UN peacekeeping force in operation in the world as of 2013.

On 16 June 2023, the Foreign Minister of Mali requested that the United Nations terminate MINUSMA due to what he called its "failure" to stabilize the situation there. The mission was officially terminated on 30 June 2023, with all UN forces due to leave Mali by 31 December 2023.

== Organisation and forces ==
Its headquarters were in the Malian capital city, Bamako. Military intelligence was evaluated by the Force Headquarters U2-Intelligence Section.

The force was led by Danish Major General Michael Lollesgaard in 2015 and 2016, Belgian Major General Jean-Paul Deconinck until 2 October 2018, after which he was succeeded by Lieutenant General Dennis Gyllensporre of Sweden. The force commander in November 2021 was Dutch Lieutenant-General Johannes Matthijssen.

As of 30 September 2021, countries contributing with police and military personnel were:

- Chad – 1466 personnel
- Bangladesh – 1399 personnel
- Senegal – 1340 personnel
- Togo – 1232 personnel
- Egypt – 1225 personnel
- Burkina Faso – 1105 personnel
- Niger – 902 personnel
- Ivory Coast – 827 personnel
- Guinea – 678 personnel
- Germany – 435 personnel
- China – 426 personnel
- Benin – 420 personnel
- Jordan – 345 personnel
- Cambodia – 289 personnel
- United Kingdom – 256 personnel
- Sri Lanka – 242 personnel
- Nigeria – 224 personnel
- Pakistan – 217 personnel
- Nepal – 202 personnel
- Sweden – 190 personnel
- El Salvador – 176 personnel
- Liberia – 162 personnel
- Ghana – 158 personnel
- Tunisia – 103 personnel
- Portugal – 69 personnel
- Belgium – 53 personnel
- Lithuania – 49 personnel
- France – 34 personnel
- Canada – 18 personnel
- Sierra Leone – 18 personnel
- Norway – 17 personnel
- Switzerland – 13 personnel
- Ireland – 12 personnel
- Ukraine – 12 personnel
- Gambia – 11 personnel
- Cameroon – 19 personnel
- Kenya – 10 personnel
- Indonesia – 9 personnel
- Netherlands – 9 personnel
- Finland – 8 personnel
- United States – 8 personnel
- Mauritania – 7 personnel
- Turkey – 7 personnel
- Bhutan – 5 personnel
- Italy – 5 personnel
- Romania – 5 personnel
- Czech Republic – 4 personnel
- Mexico – 4 personnel
- Spain – 3 personnel
- Zambia – 3 personnel
- Austria – 2 personnel
- Bosnia and Herzegovina – 2 personnel
- Denmark – 2 personnel
- Estonia – 2 personnel
- Guatemala – 2 personnel
- Iran – 2 personnel
- Luxembourg – 2 personnel
- Armenia – 1 personnel
- Australia – 1 personnel
- Burundi – 1 personnel
- Dominican Republic – 1 personnel
- Ethiopia – 1 personnel
- Gabon – 1 personnel
- Latvia – 1 personnel
- Vietnam – 1 personnel

== Incidents ==
In October 2013, a suicide bomber attacked the Chadian soldiers resulting in the death of two soldiers.

On 13 December, two Senegalese peacekeepers were killed at a bombing outside the Malian Solidarity Bank in Kidal a day before the second round of the Malian parliamentary election, 2013.

In October 2014, 10 soldiers were killed, nine from Niger and one from Senegal near Gao and Kidal respectively, bringing the total number of dead soldiers from the mission to 21 with dozens more wounded. It also preceded Malian Foreign Minister Abdoulaye Diop calling for the UNSC to send a rapid deployment force to the country claiming that there was an increase in drug traffickers and Islamist fighters. UN Peacekeeping chief Hervé Ladsous also spoke to the UNSC from Bamako, where he attend a memorial service for the dead soldiers. He added that a combination of factors has led to the increase in attacks on UN troops, including the drawdown of French forces and a perceived lack of Malian security forces, as such MINUSMA, being the main international presence in the area, was a target. He further noted that the UN was no longer working in a peacekeeping environment, but sought to increase protection of the mission's staff, equipment and bases.

On 20 January 2019 the MINUSMA base at Aguelhok was attacked by militants. The attack was repelled but 10 Chadian UN peacekeepers were killed and a further 25 injured. The militants had arrived on board a number of armed vehicles. Several of the attackers are said to have been killed. Responsibility was claimed by Al-Qaeda in the Islamic Maghreb who stated that it was a retaliatory attack for the recent visit to Chad by Israeli prime minister Benjamin Netanyahu and the subsequent revival of Chad–Israel diplomatic relations. UN Secretary-General António Guterres condemned the attack.

On 25 January 2019 three Sri Lankan peacekeepers were killed, while another three were injured, when their armoured vehicle came under an Improvised Explosive Device (IED) attack, in the general area of Douentza in Mali.

The United Nations reported that attacks in the northern Mali against a UN convoy killed three peacekeepers from Chad and injured four others. Secretary-General António Guterres and UN spokesman Stephane Dujarric criticized the attacks, and said that they could account to war crimes as per the international law.

On 10 May 2020 three UN MINUSMA peacekeepers were killed in action near Aguelhok.

As of 31 March 2020, 209 MINUSMA troops died.

Twenty MINUSMA troops were wounded, some seriously, in attacks by rebels in Douentza, Mopti, on 10 February 2021.

On 30 March 2021, MINUSMA published a report that concluded a French air strike on 3 January 2021 on the remote village of Bounti in Sahel state, killed at least 22 people, 19 of whom were civilians. The strike was carried out under Operation Eclipse – a joint operation involving armed forces from Mali, France and the G5 Sahel. French military have denied wrongdoing saying the strike, by a Mirage 2000 bomber, had "neutralised" dozens of jihadists in a precision attack.

On 3 October 2021, one Egyptian peacekeeper was killed, four of his colleagues seriously injured, in an IED attack.

On 5 December 2021, two explosions hit MINUSMA barracks in Gao. The French army said there was only material damage and did not provide details about any possible origin of the blasts.

On 8 December 2021, seven MINUSMA peacekeepers were killed when their convoy hit an improvised explosive device in central Mali, in the Bandiagara area in the Mopti region when driving between the towns of Douentza and Sévaré. No group immediately claimed responsibility for the blast.

On 1 June 2022, a Jordanian member of the MINUSMA peacekeeping force was killed and three more injured in Kidal Region, Mali.

From 1 November to 4 November 2023, 37 peacekeepers were injured after six IED attacks on their convoy, which was departing them from Kidal.
