= Gotland-class submarine =

Swedish Navy attack submarine class

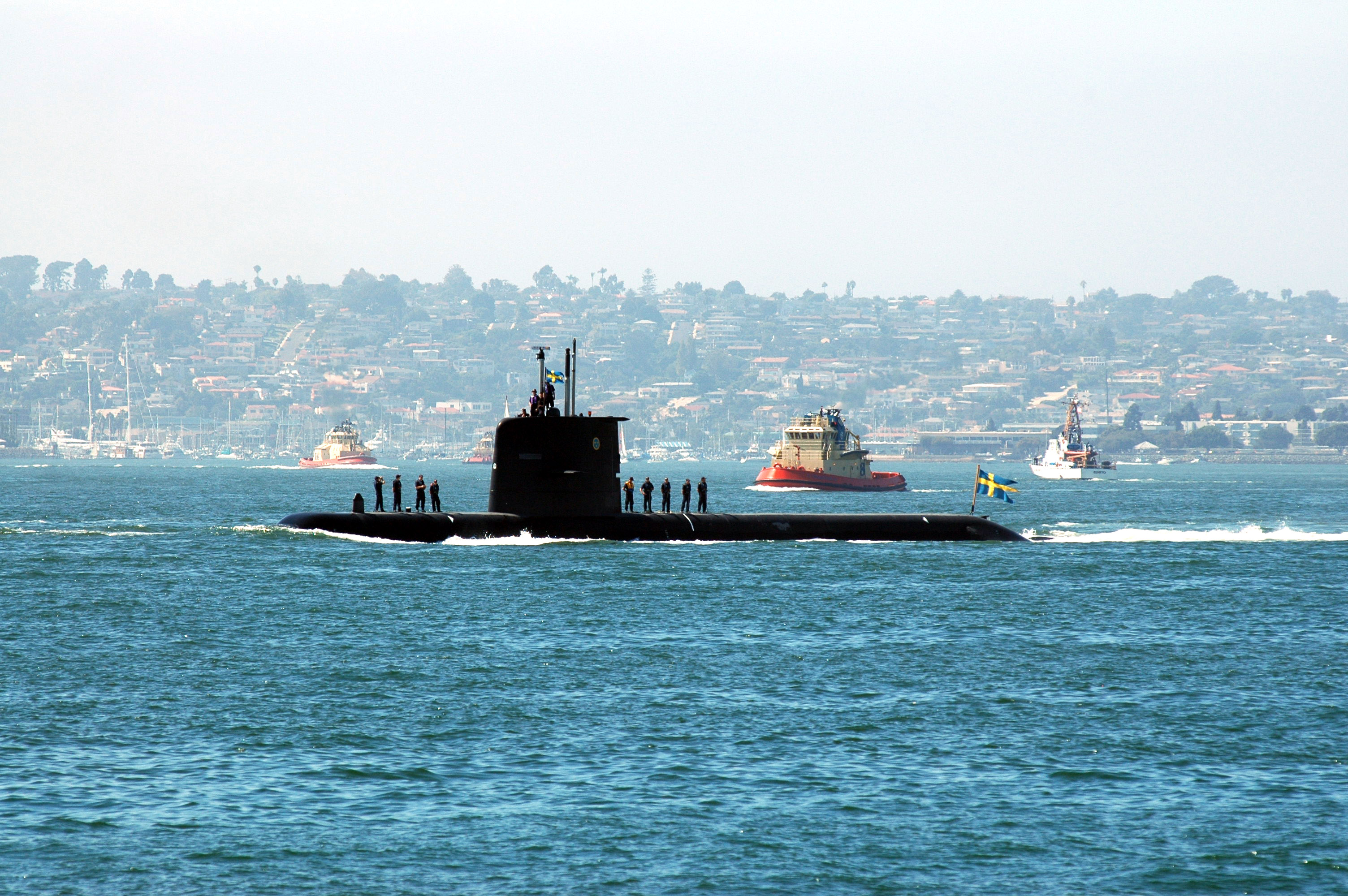
- HSwMS Gotland

Class overview
- Builders: Kockums
- Operators: Swedish Navy
- Preceded by: Västergötland class
- Succeeded by: Blekinge class
- Built: 1992–1996
- In commission: 1996–present
- Planned: 3
- Completed: 3
- Active: 3

General characteristics
- Type: Submarine
- Displacement: Surfaced: 1,494 tonnes (1,470 long tons); Submerged: 1,599 tonnes (1,574 long tons)
- Length: 60.4 m (198 ft 2 in)
- Beam: 6.2 m (20 ft 4 in)
- Draft: 5.6 m (18 ft 4 in)
- Propulsion: 2 × Diesel-electric MTU engines; 2 × Kockums v4-275R Stirling AIP units
- Speed: Surfaced: 11 knots (20 km/h); Submerged: 20 knots (37 km/h) on batteries; 5 knots (9.3 km/h) on AIP
- Complement: 18–22 officers; 6–10 ratings
- Sensors & processing systems: CSU 90-2 integrated sonar sensor suite
- Armament: 4 × 533 mm (21.0 in) torpedo tubes; 2 × 400 mm (15.7 in) torpedo tubes; 48 × Externally mounted naval mines

The Gotland-class submarines of the Swedish Navy are modern diesel-electric submarines, which were designed and built by the Kockums shipyard (since 2014 owned by SAAB AB) in Sweden. They are the first submarines in the world to feature a Stirling engine air-independent propulsion (AIP) system, which extends their underwater endurance from a few days to weeks. This capability had previously only been available with nuclear-powered submarines.

== Features ==
The Gotland-class attack submarines are the most modern submarines of the Swedish Navy, mainly designed for submarine missions such as antiship/antisubmarine warfare, collecting of intelligence (communications intelligence (COMINT), electronic signals intelligence (ELINT)), forward surveillance, special operations, and mine-laying tasks.

On the water surface, the submarine is powered by two sets of MTU engines. While submerged, the Kockums-built Stirling engine AIP system is used to drive a 75-kilowatt (101 shp) generator for either propulsion or charging the batteries. A Stirling engine is particularly well suited for a submarine because the engine is nearly silent and can use the surrounding seawater as a heat sink to increase efficiency. Submerged endurance is dependent on the amount of liquid oxygen stored onboard and is described as "weeks". The class is characterized by its low acoustic signatures, extreme shock resistance, and a competent combat system.

Kockums touts extreme manoeuvrability for this class due to the hull design and a well-placed X rudder. The X rudder provides four control surfaces, along with two mounted on the sail, which enables sharp turns and the ability to operate very close to the seabed. Ship automation and computerized steering allow a single operator to steer the submarine in depth and course, which also results in a smaller crew complement, leading to good accommodation standards and low operating costs.

The class has many features that enhance stealth, helping it to remain undetected. All shipboard machinery is isolated and mounted on rubber dampeners to reduce vibrations and noises; a hydrodynamic hull design reduces noise, infrared signature, and active sonar response. Its magnetic signature is counteracted by 27 independent electromagnets, short-circuiting extremely low frequency (ELF) electrical fields. Various hull coatings reduce active sonar response, and the mast is coated with radar-absorbent material. Combined with the near-silent operation of the Stirling generator and slow-turning propeller to prevent cavitation, the boats are very difficult to detect underwater, especially in their normal area of operations, the Baltic Sea.

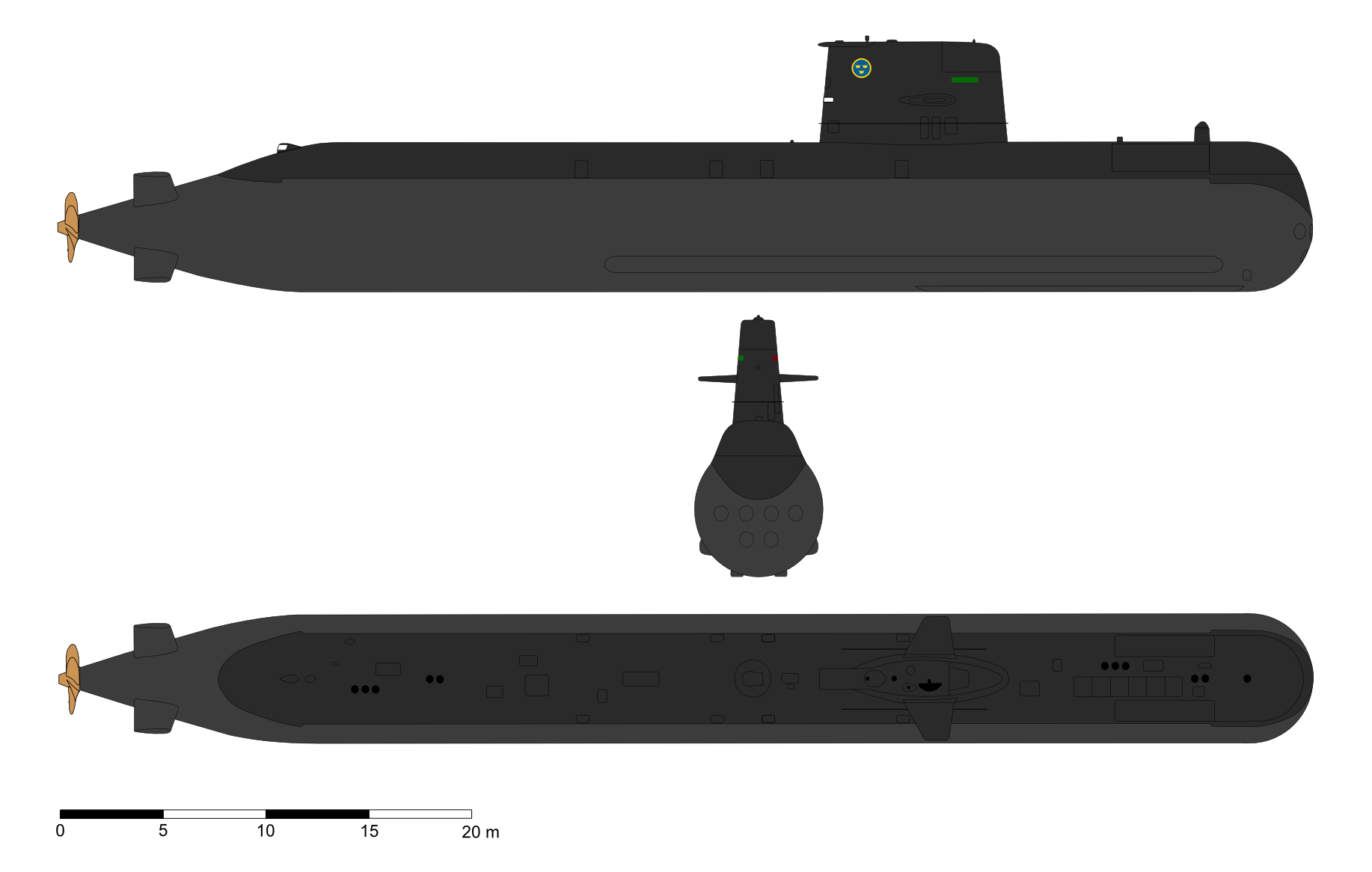
Drawing of the ships in the class

== Units ==
Ship name	Laid down	Launched	Commissioned	Service	Status	Badge
HSwMS Gotland (Gtd)	10 October 1992	2 February 1995	1996	1st Submarine Flotilla	Active	
HSwMS Uppland (Upd)	14 January 1994	8 February 1995	1996	1st Submarine Flotilla	Active	
HSwMS Halland (Hnd)	21 October 1994	27 September 1996	1996	1st Submarine Flotilla	Active	

== Deployments ==
After being refitted and upgraded to sustain the higher temperatures of tropical water, HSwMS Halland took part in a multi-national exercise in the Mediterranean from September 16, 2000. Allegedly, there she remained undetected while still recording many of her friendly adversaries, attracting interest from the participating countries. In early November of the same year, she participated in a NATO "blue-water" exercise in the Atlantic. There, she reportedly won a victory in a mock "duel" with Spanish naval units, and then the same in a similar duel against a French SSN, a nuclear-powered attack submarine. She also defeated an American SSN, the USS Houston.

=== Secondment to United States Navy ===
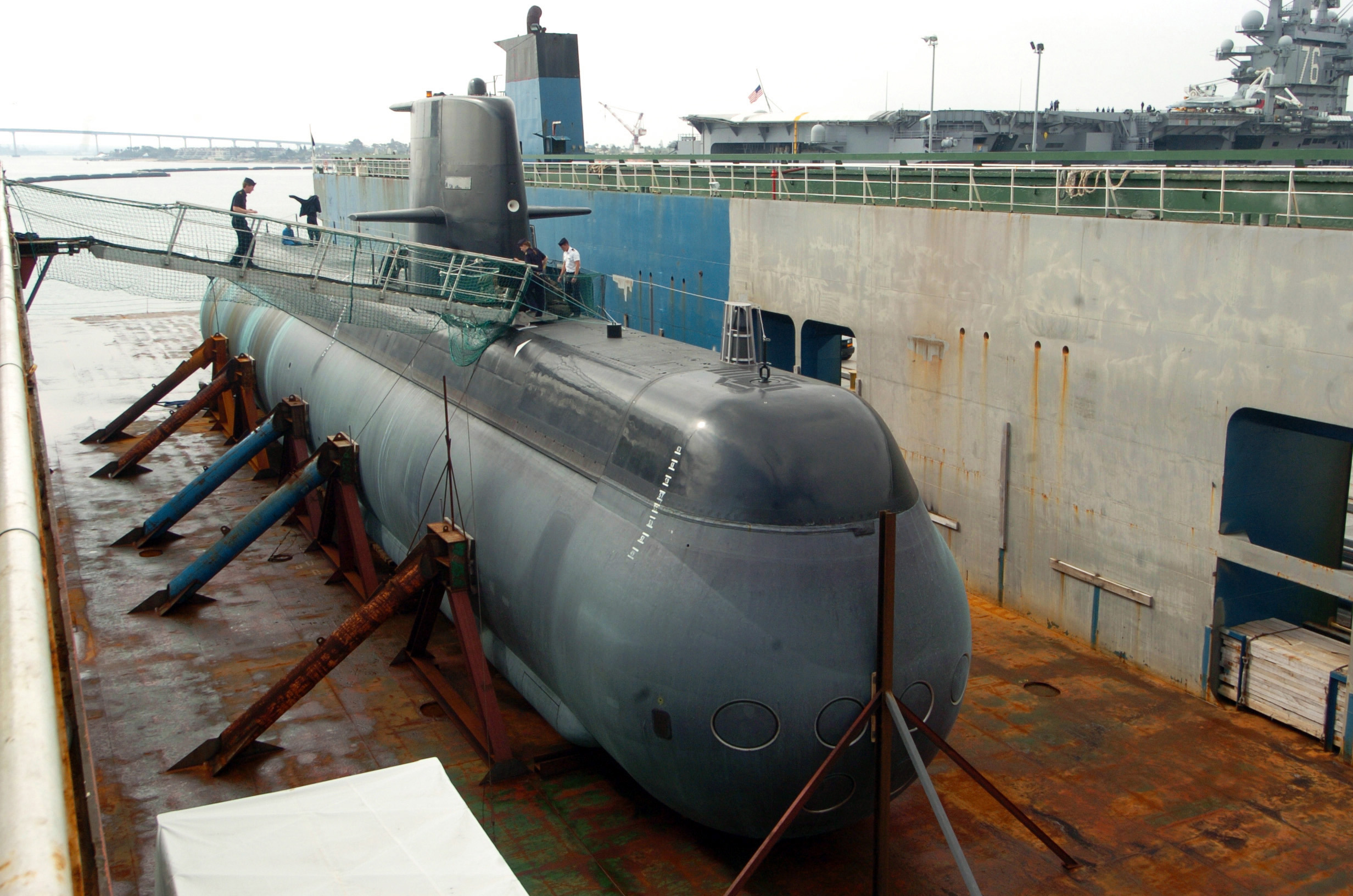
HSwMS Gotland onboard MV Eide Transporter in San Diego

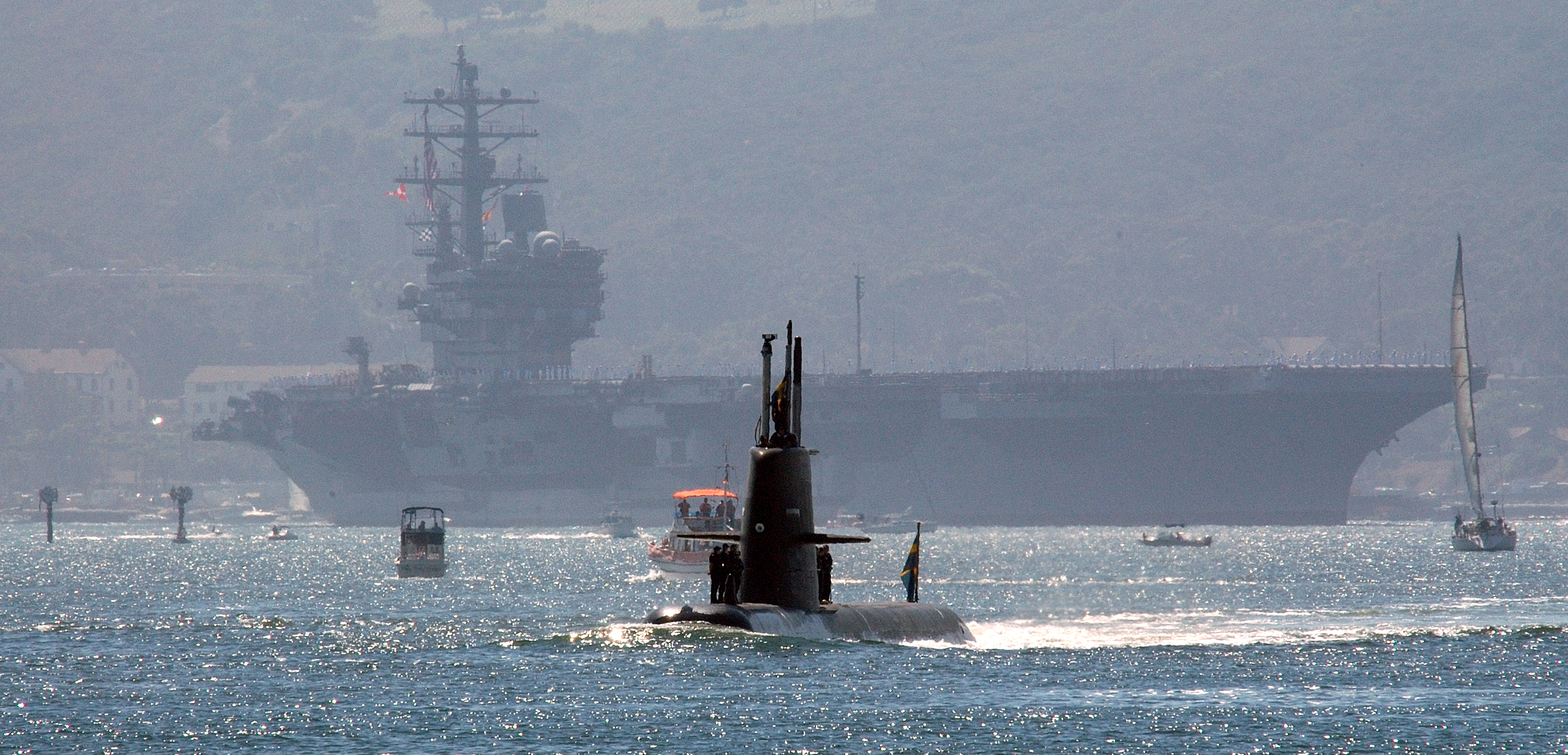
HSwMS Gotland transits through San Diego Harbor with the Nimitz-class aircraft carrier USS Ronald Reagan following close behind during the "Sea and Air Parade" held as part of Fleet Week San Diego 2005.

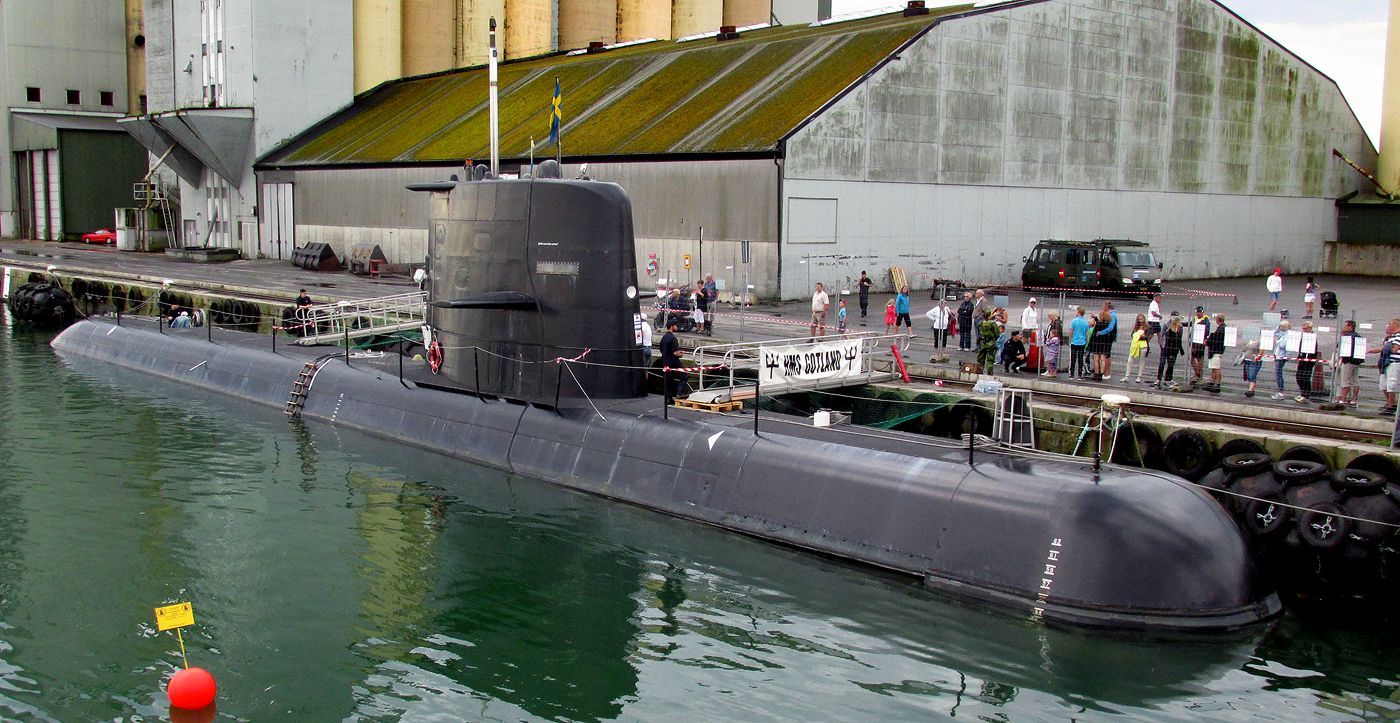
Gotland in the port of Ystad 2015

In 2004, the Swedish government received a request from the United States to lease HSwMS Gotland – Swedish-flagged, commanded and crewed, for one year for use in antisubmarine warfare exercises. The Swedish government granted this request in October 2004, with both navies signing a memorandum of understanding on 21 March 2005. The lease was extended for another 12 months in 2006. In July 2007, HSwMS Gotland departed San Diego for Sweden.

In 2005, HSwMS Gotland managed to snap several pictures of USS Ronald Reagan during a wargaming exercise in the Pacific Ocean, demonstrating that it was in a position to sink the aircraft carrier. The exercise was conducted to evaluate the effectiveness of the US fleet against diesel-electric submarines, which some have noted as severely lacking.

== Overhaul ==
=== Initial discussions ===
In March 2013, Kockums received an initial order for an overhaul for two of the Gotland-class submarines. The overhaul was expected to be completed by 2017. With these upgrades, the submarines would be able to remain in active duty until after 2025. On 2 April 2014, the Swedish defence minister, insisting on the importance of submarines to the security of Sweden, announced the Government's intent to upgrade two of the Gotland-class vessels, as well as purchase two new "stealth" submarines of another type.

=== Mid-life upgrade contract ===
Negotiations concluded on 30 June 2015 with the signature of a contract between Sweden's Defense Material Administration (FMV) and Saab Kockums. In addition to the construction of two new Type 26 A SSKs, the contract provides for a mid-life upgrade of HSwMS Gotland and her sister ship HSwMS Uppland, for SEK 2.1 billion. Gotland is expected to return to the FMV in late 2018 and Uppland in late 2019, following a series of platform and combat systems upgrades. Gotland returned to active duty in June 2018 after receiving modification for over 20 systems. Same systems will also be included on the new A26 submarines. Uppland relaunched in June 2019 and was delivered to the Navy in December 2020. In March 2022 FMV and SAAB signed a contract for MLU of HSwMS Halland. Halland was relaunched in February 2025.

==== Mid-life upgrades modifications ====
The elements that were modified on the ships include:

- Hull extended by 2 meters
- Upgrade of the Stirling engine from the Kockums v4-275R Mk2 to the Kockums v4-275R Mk3 variant.
- A new mast suite supplied by Safran
- A new sonar, the Kongsberg's SA9510S
- Systems changed / improved:
  - New electronic warfare systems, the Exelis’ ES-3701
  - Management systems
  - Sensors systems
  - Communications
  - Cyber-security

== See also ==
- List of submarine classes in service
- Coastal submarine

=== Equivalent submarines of the same era ===
- Lada class
- Song class
- Dolphin class
- Scorpène class
- Heroine class
- Type 212A
