= Jean-Paul Deconinck =

Belgian major general

Major General Jean-Paul Deconinck was the Force Commander of the United Nations Multidimensional Integrated Stabilization Mission in Mali. Prior to this appointment on 2 March 2017 by United Nations Secretary General António Guterres he was Commander Land Forces of the Belgian Armed Forces. Major General Deconinck has served as Deputy Assistant Chief of Staff and Commander of the Belgian Defence College. In addition he has held the positions of Commander of the 7th Brigade and Force Commander of the EU Battle Group. He is a graduate of the Belgian Royal Military Academy, with a master's degree in military and social sciences, the French War College and the Defence College in Brussels.
