= United Nations Security Council Resolution 2100 =

Resolution on the Mali conflict after the 2012 Tuareg rebellion

UN Security Council Resolution 2100
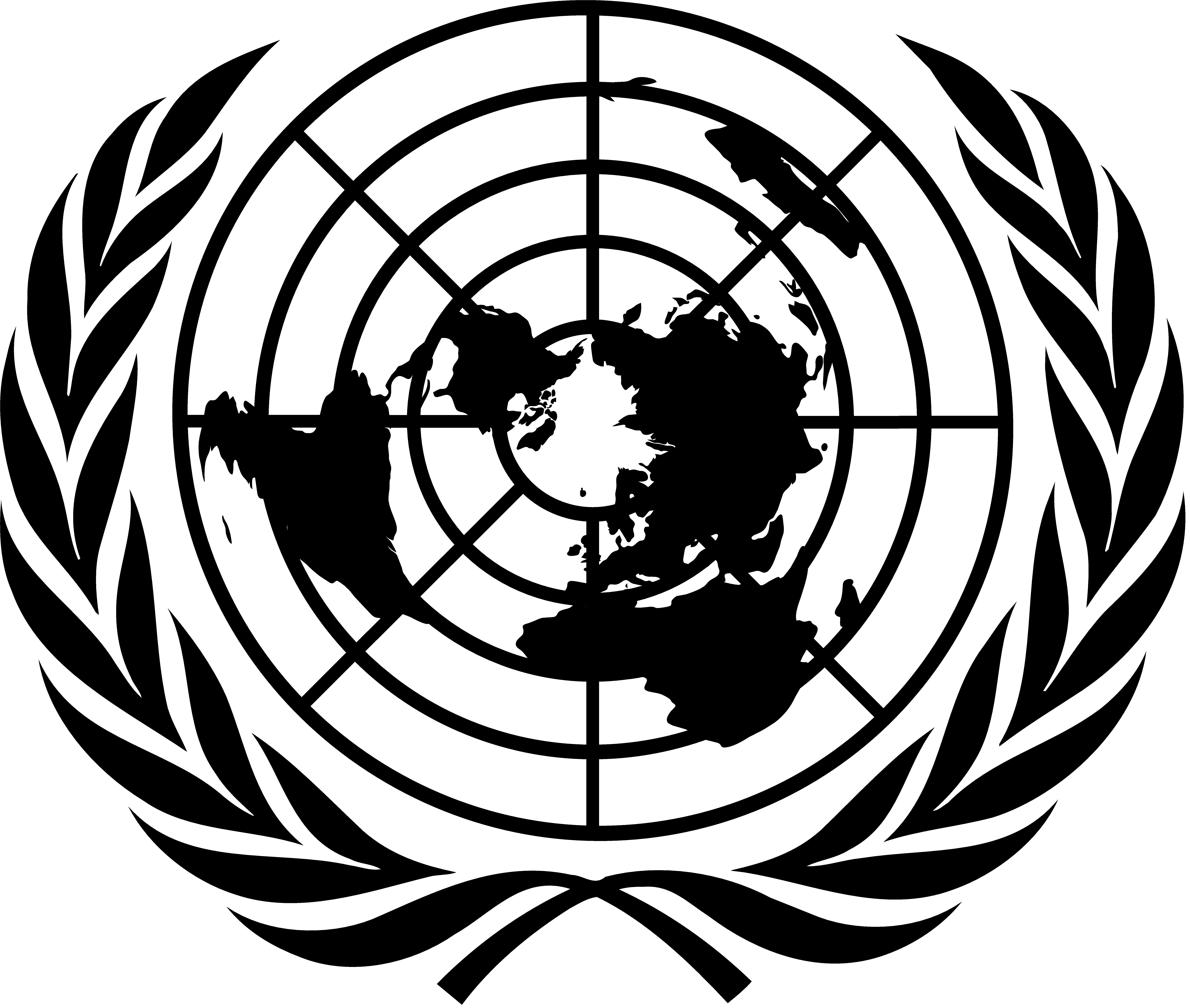
- UN emblem
- Date: 25 April 2013
- Meeting no.: 6952
- Code: S/RES/2100 (Document)
- Voting summary: 15 voted for; None voted against; None abstained
- Result: Adopted

Security Council composition
- Permanent members: China; France; Russia; United Kingdom; United States
- Non-permanent members: Argentina; Australia; Azerbaijan; Guatemala; South Korea; Luxembourg; Morocco; Pakistan; Rwanda; Togo

The United Nations Security Council established the Peacekeeping Force for Mali effective 1 July, unanimously adopting resolution 2100 (2013) with the aim to support the political transition process and help stabilize Mali.

United Nations Security Council resolution 2100 was adopted in 2013.

== See also ==
- List of United Nations Security Council Resolutions 2101 to 2200 (2013–2015)
