= Defence Innovation Accelerator for the North Atlantic =

Intergovernmental defence technology organisation

Defence Innovation Accelerator for the North Atlantic (DIANA)
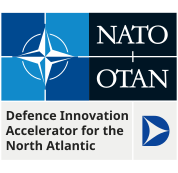
- Formation: Proposed: 14 June 2021; Operational: 19 June 2023
- Location: London, UK
- Managing Director: Mr James Appathurai (interim)
- Parent organization: NATO
- Website: www.diana.nato.int

The Defence Innovation Accelerator for the North Atlantic (DIANA) is an organisation within NATO with the aim of facilitating the development of emerging and disruptive dual-use technologies.

Through a network of accelerator sites and test centres, DIANA aims to be a conduit between universities, industry, governments, and technology companies from across the NATO alliance. The companies that are successfully selected from a call for proposals receive funding from the NATO Innovation Fund.

The DIANA Board of Directors is responsible for governance of the organisation and has representatives from all NATO nations.

DIANA's first managing director is Professor Deeph Chana.

== History ==
Members of the NATO alliance agreed to the creation of DIANA at the North Atlantic Council in Brussels on 14 June 2021.

On 7 April 2022, NATO foreign ministers approved the Charter for DIANA. In the same month the NATO Advisory Group on Emerging and Disruptive Technologies, chaired by Professor Deeph Chana, released its second annual report examining the development of DIANA.

NATO Heads of State and Government at the North Atlantic Council in Madrid on 29 June 2022 officially endorsed the Charter and agreed to the initial locations of the test centres and accelerator sites for DIANA.

On 30 March 2023, NATO Deputy Secretary General Mircea Geoană and UK Minister for Defence Procurement Alex Chalk opened the first regional office of DIANA at the Imperial College London Innovation Hub, based in White City.

On 19 June 2023, DIANA became operational and instigated its first call for proposals. The three pilot challenge programmes announced were centred on innovative dual-use technologies for energy resilience, undersea sensing and surveillance, and secure information sharing.

On 30 November 2023, DIANA announced the first 44 companies selected out of 1,300 applicants from its call for proposals. The companies came from a range of fields such as robotics, ocean sensors, quantum technologies, and energy-generating textiles. Each company will receive a grant of €100,000 to be put towards expenses such as salaries, rent, and equipment.

By 14 March 2024, DIANA had 23 accelerator sites and 182 test centres. The organisation stated that it aimed to reach full operational capacity by 2025.

On 24 May 2024, a regional hub in Tallinn, Estonia was officially inaugurated.
