= HSwMS Halland (Hnd) =

Swedish submarine

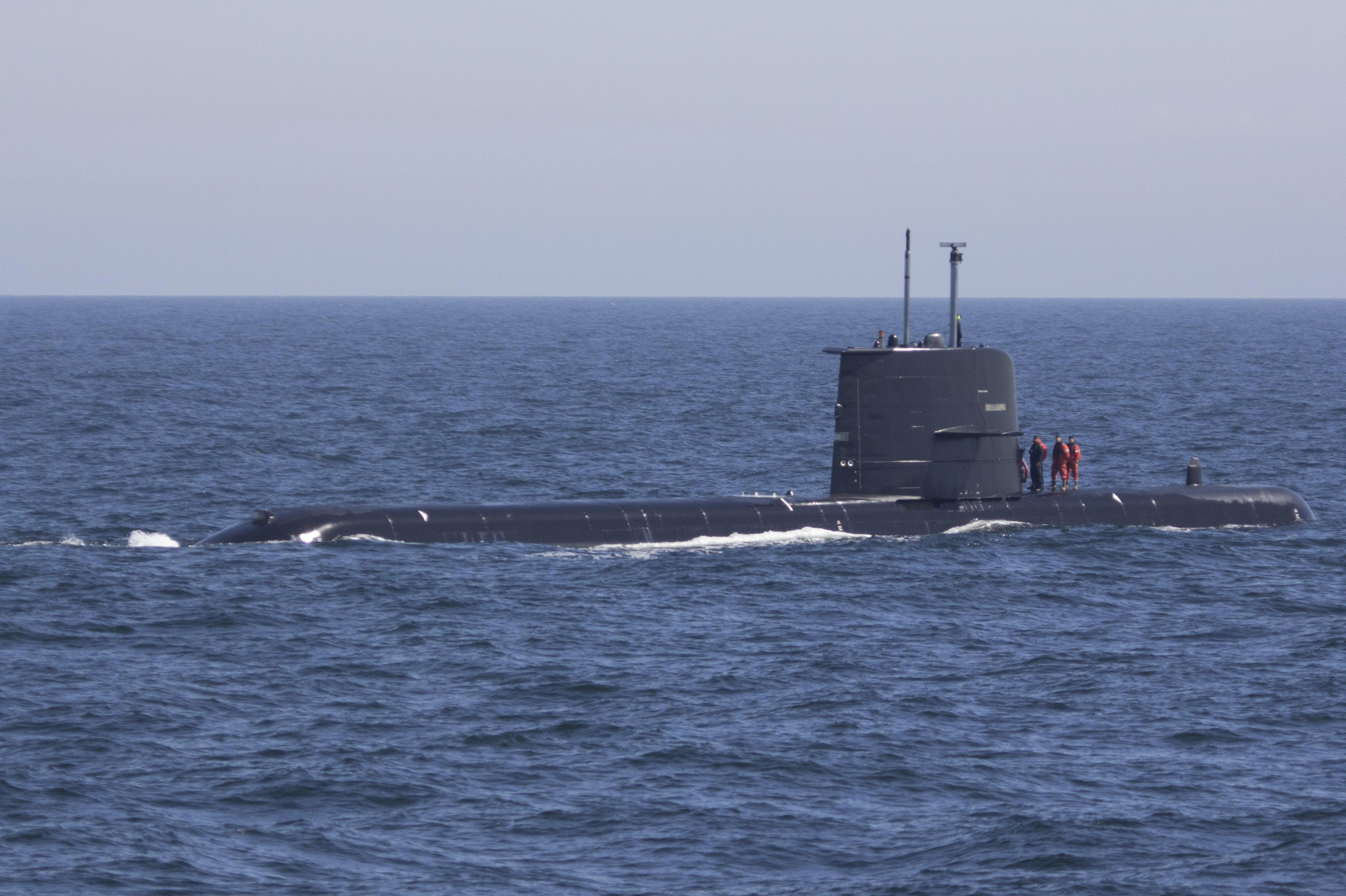
- HSwMS Halland in 2016

History

Sweden
- Name: Halland
- Builder: Kockums
- Laid down: 14 January 1994
- Launched: 19 February 1996
- Commissioned: July 1997
- Home port: Karlskrona, Sweden
- Identification: MMSI number: 265826000
- Motto: Virtute Leonis
- Status: Active in service
- Badge

General characteristics
- Class & type: Gotland-class submarine
- Displacement: 1526 tons standard, 1647 tons submerged
- Length: 60.4 metres (198 feet 2 inches)
- Beam: 6.2 metres (20 feet 4 inches)
- Draught: 5.6 metres (18 feet 4 inches)
- Propulsion: two diesel engines (1,300 brake horsepower each), two Stirling engines (75 kilowatts each), one electric motor (1,800 shaft horsepower), one shaft
- Speed: 10 knots (19 km/h; 12 mph) surfaced, 20 knots (37 km/h; 23 mph) submerged
- Endurance: over 14 days submerged without snorkeling
- Test depth: 500 ft (150 m)
- Complement: 20 officers, 15 enlisted
- Armament: four 533-mm (21-inch) torpedo tubes with 12 torpedoes, two 400-mm (15.75-inch) torpedo tubes with 6 torpedoes, 48 external mines

HSwMS Halland (Hnd) is a submarine in the Swedish Navy. It is the third submarine in the Gotland-class.
