= HSwMS Gotland (Gtd) =

Swedish Gotland-class submarine

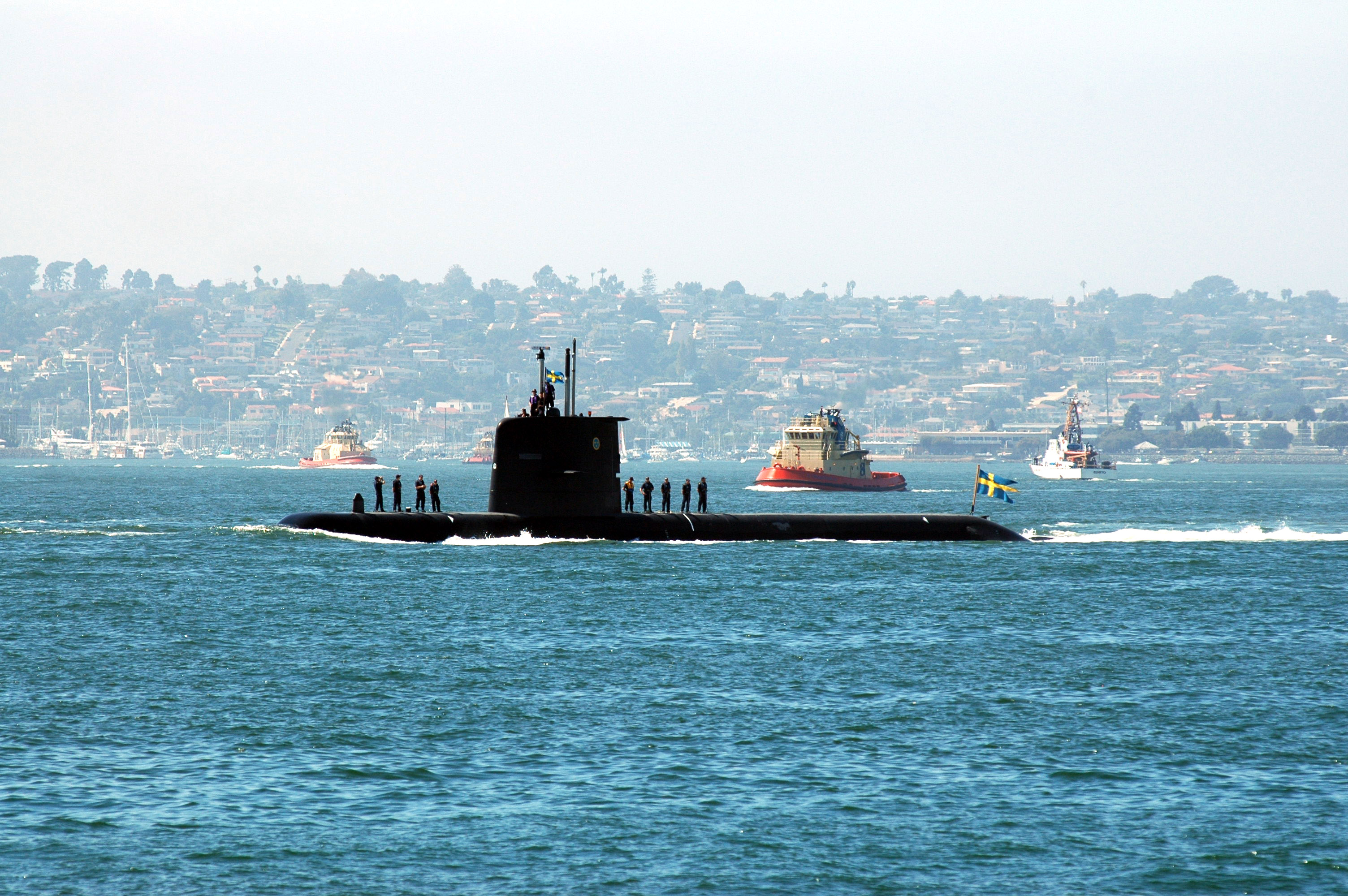
- HSwMS Gotland

History

Sweden
- Name: Gotland
- Namesake: Swedish island Gotland
- Builder: Kockums
- Laid down: 10 October 1992
- Launched: 2 February 1995
- Commissioned: April 1996
- Home port: Karlskrona, Sweden
- Identification: MMSI number: 265848000; Callsign: SHWD
- Motto: Gothus sum, cave cornua; (I am a Gothlander, watch out for the horns)
- Status: in active service
- Badge

General characteristics
- Class & type: Gotland-class submarine
- Displacement: 1,380 tons standard, 1,599 tons submerged
- Length: 60.4 metres (198 feet 2 inches)
- Beam: 6.2 metres (20 feet 4 inches)
- Draught: 5.6 metres (18 feet 4 inches)
- Propulsion: two diesel engines (1,300 bhp (970 kW) each), two Stirling engines (75 kW (101 hp) each), one electric motor (1,800 shp (1,300 kW)), one shaft
- Speed: 11 knots (20 km/h; 13 mph) surfaced, 20 knots (37 km/h; 23 mph) submerged
- Endurance: over 14 days submerged without snorkeling
- Test depth: 500 ft (150 m)
- Complement: 18–22 officers, 6–10 enlisted
- Armament: 4 × 533 mm (21 in) torpedo tubes with 12 torpedoes; 2 × 400 mm (16 in) torpedo tubes with 6 torpedoes; 48 external mines

HSwMS Gotland (Gtd) is a defense submarine of the Swedish Navy. It was the first ship of the Gotland-class, which was the first operational submarine class in the world to use air-independent propulsion in the form of Stirling engines which use liquid oxygen and diesel as the propellant.

It was built by Kockums, launched in 1995, and subsequently commissioned in 1996.

In 2015, Sweden's Defense Material Administration (FMV) signed a contract with Saab Kockums which included a mid-life upgrade of two members of the Gotland class, Gotland and Halland, for SEK 2.1 billion. Gotland is expected to return to the FMV in late 2018 following a series of platform and combat systems upgrades.

== Construction ==
The submarine Gotland was designed and built by Kockums in Malmö and launched on 2 February 1995. The honor guard during the launching consisted of the amphibian company of the Fårösund Marine Brigade (FMB). Participants from Gotland included the governor, the municipal council chairman, the commander of the Gotland Military Command and the commander of FMB.

The submarine is essentially based on the Västergötland-class submarine, but with a lot of improvements. It has two diesel engines and two Stirling engines which gives air independence and doubled endurance compared with previous submarine types. A gas cycle drives a generator that charges the submarines battery which is connected to the propeller engine. For passive reconnaissance, she is equipped with circular sonar and flank array sonar.

== Mid-life upgrade ==
In 2020, HSwMS Gotland underwent a mid-life upgrade, as her sister HSwMS Uppland had done before her. During the upgrade, a number of systems that will be used in the next generation submarines, the Blekinge-class (A26), were installed. More than 20 new systems on board the new Gotland-class were implemented, which contributes to their de-risking for the A26. This also offers training opportunities for the crew when they, in the future, deploy on board the A26.

The upgrade process entails many new systems, such as the Stirling AIP, a complete new mast suite, sonars and sensors as well as management and communication systems. In order to host all systems, the submarine length of the vessel was increased to 62 m and increased 200 tons in weight, to reach a displacement (surfaced) of 1580 tons.

== Lease to the United States Navy ==
In 2004, the Swedish Government received a request from the United States of America to lease Gotland—Swedish-flagged, commanded, and crewed—for one year for use in anti-submarine warfare exercises. The Swedish Government granted this request in October 2004, with both navies signing a memorandum of understanding on 21 March 2005.

Gotland was loaded on board the Norwegian semi-submersible heavy-lift ship, MV Eide Transporter, on 10 May 2005, for a month-long voyage over the Atlantic Ocean and through the Panama Canal to Naval Base Point Loma in San Diego, California, where it arrived on 27 June 2005. After a couple weeks of getting accustomed to the new environment, the exercises with United States Third Fleet began on 18 July 2005. The lease was extended for another 12 months in 2006.

Gotland managed to penetrate the defensive measures of Carrier Strike Group 7 undetected and snap several pictures of USS Ronald Reagan during the December pre-deployment Joint Task Force Exercise 06-2 (JTFEX 06–2) in the Pacific Ocean (probably in the California Operating Areas), effectively "sinking" the aircraft carrier. The exercise was conducted to evaluate the effectiveness of the US Fleet against modern diesel-electric submarines, which some have noted as severely lacking. In 2001, during the exercise JTFEX 01-2 in the Caribbean Sea, the German U24 of the conventional 206 diesel-electric class "sank" the carrier Enterprise by firing flares and taking a photograph through its periscope.

In July 2007, Gotland departed San Diego for Sweden.

== Raid against Kockums ==
In the early morning of 8 April 2014, the Defence Materiel Administration, known as FMV, with the help of the Swedish Army, raided the Kockums shipyard in Malmö, Sweden, then owned by German defense giant ThyssenKrupp Marine Systems. The goal of the mission was to confiscate material belonging to the Swedish state, especially hardware relating to the Stirling engines used in HSwMS Gotland. Although the raid was performed by military police it was not violent. After Kockums employees locked the gates blocking FMV's exit with the confiscated material, a long drawn-out negotiation ensued. A compromise was finally struck in which the hardware was to be stored at a shared secure area until further notice. Since FMV was only interested in the hardware rather than the blueprints, the show of force was more likely part of a long political confrontation between the Swedish state and the owners of Kockums, rather than an attempt at discouraging espionage. Later in 2014, Kockums was sold to Saab Group.

== Gallery ==
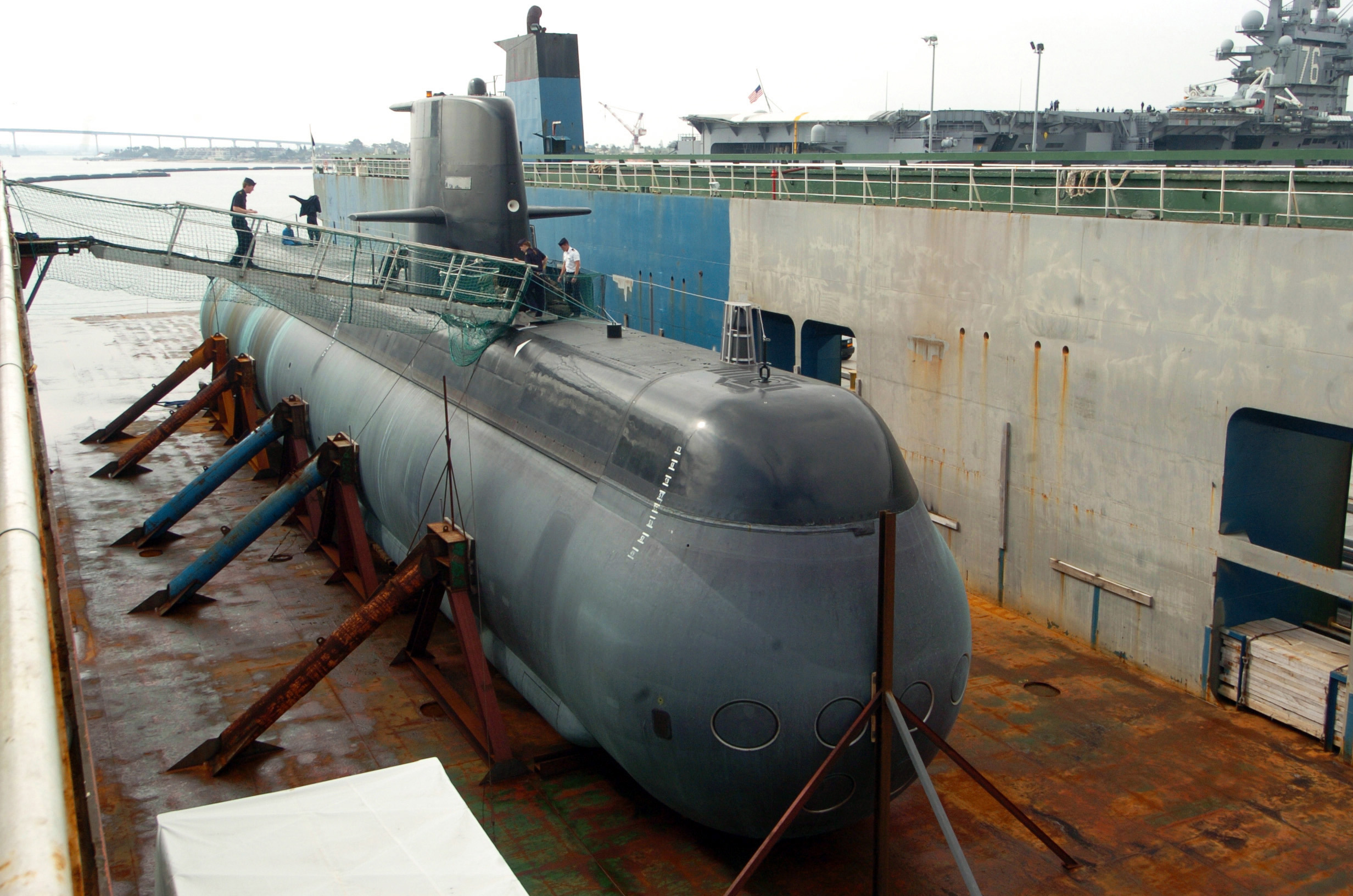
HSwMS Gotland onboard MV Eide Transporter in San Diego.

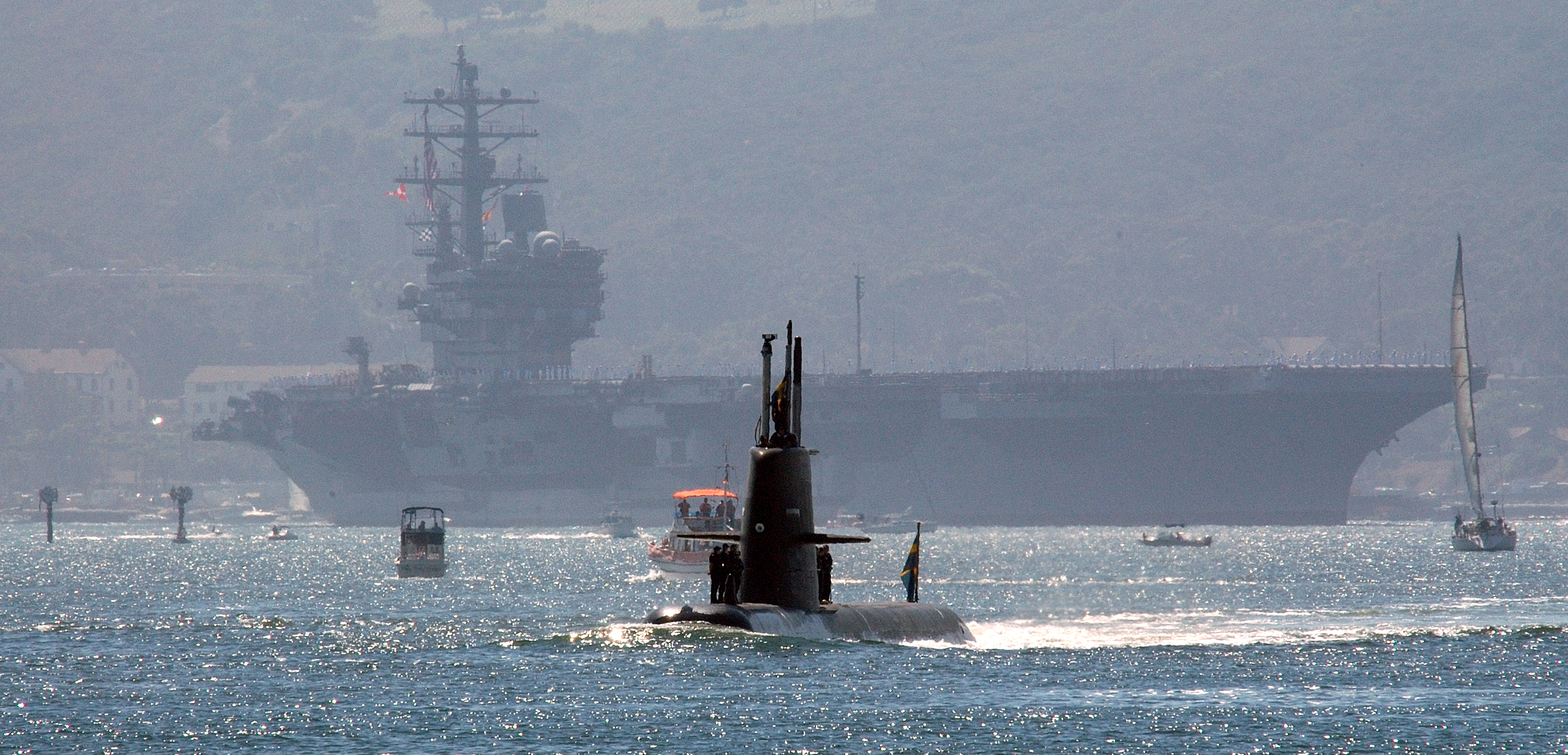
HSwMS Gotland transits through San Diego Harbor with the Nimitz-class USS Ronald Reagan following close behind during the "Sea and Air Parade"” held as part of Fleet Week San Diego 2005.

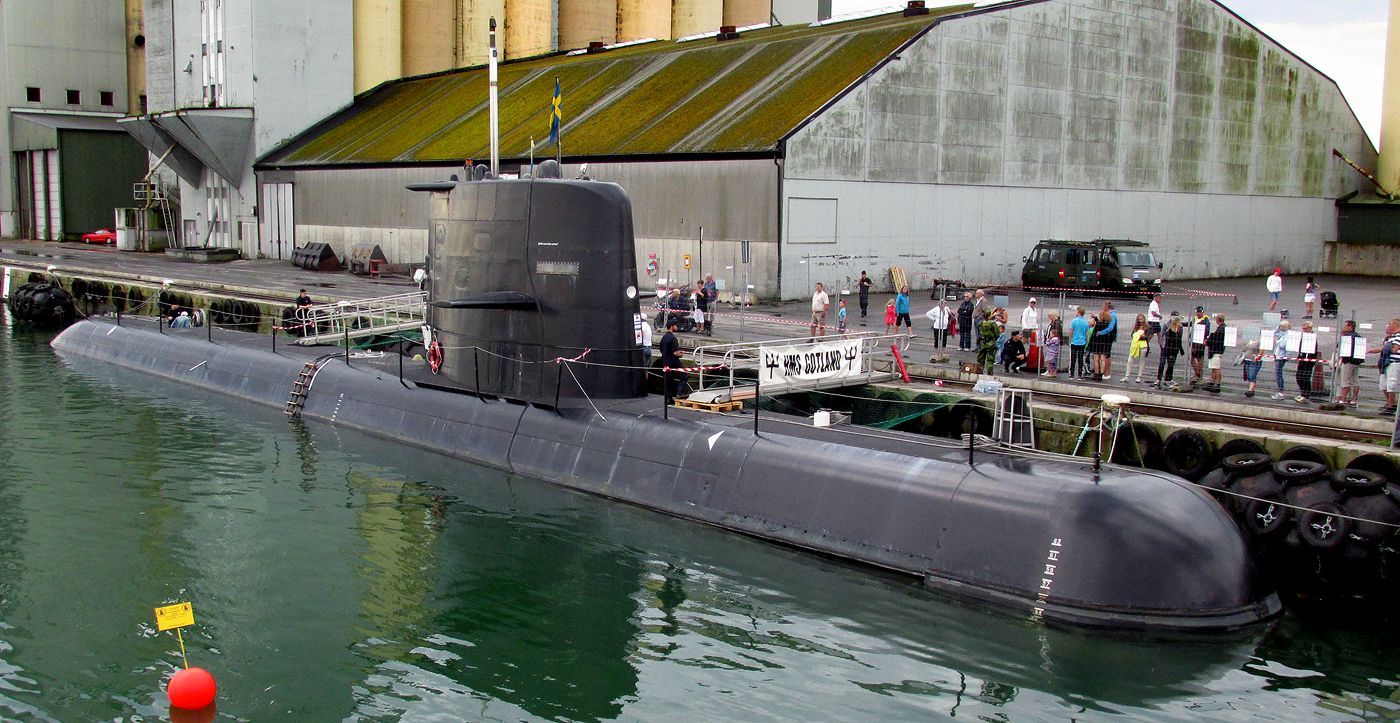
HSwMS Gotland, Ystad 2015.

== See also ==
- Air independent propulsion
- Stirling engines
