= HSwMS Uppland (Upd) =

Swedish submarine

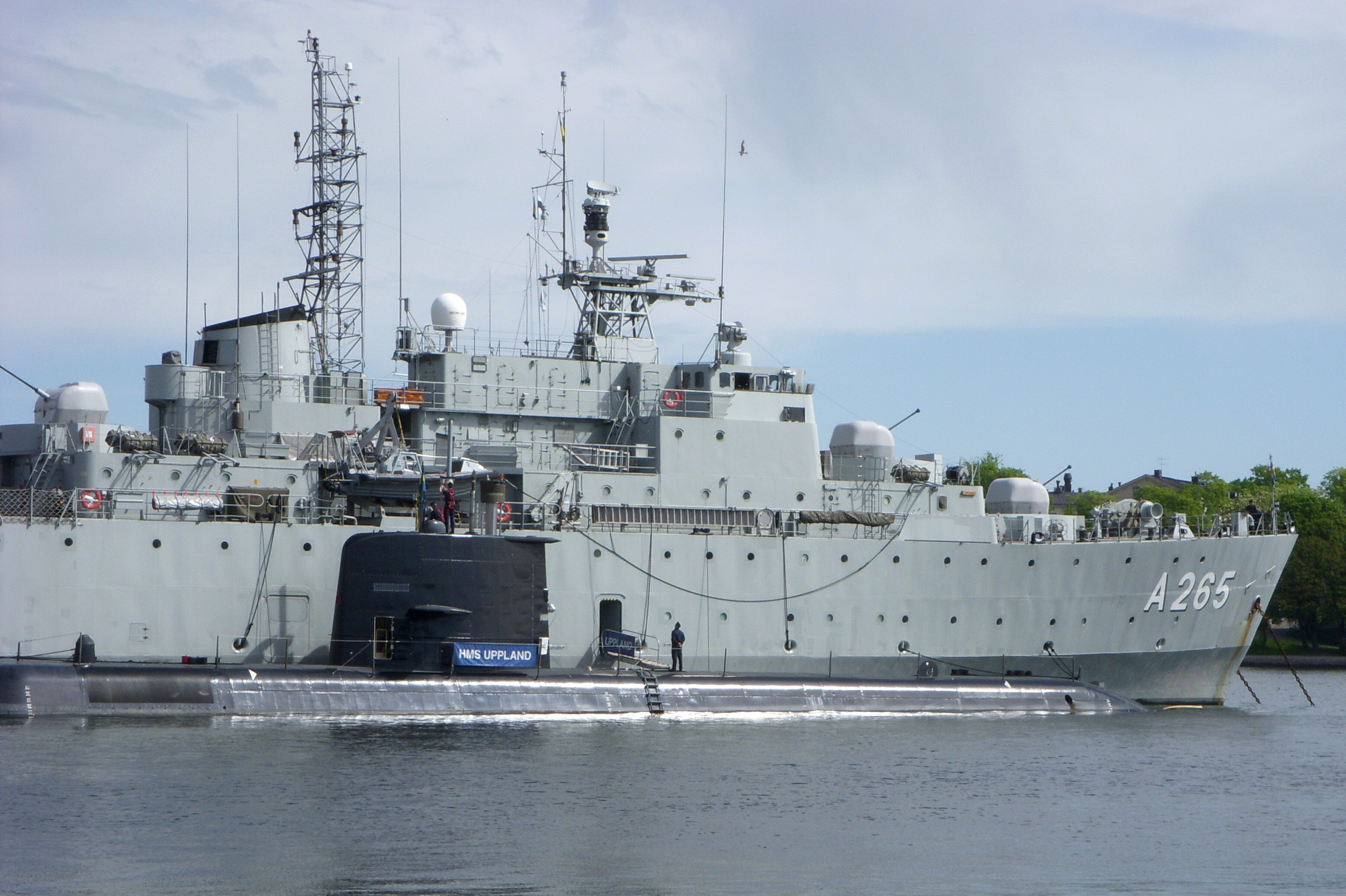
- HSwMS Uppland in 2009

History

Sweden
- Name: Uppland
- Builder: Kockums
- Laid down: 21 October 1994
- Launched: 9 February 1996
- Commissioned: October 1997
- Home port: Karlskrona, Sweden
- Identification: MMSI number: 266114000; Callsign: SDYQ
- Motto: Prudentia et audacia ("Prudence And Boldness")
- Status: Active in service
- Badge

General characteristics
- Class & type: Gotland-class submarine
- Displacement: 1526 tons standard, 1647 tons submerged
- Length: 60.4 m (198 ft 2 in)
- Beam: 6.2 m (20 ft 4 in)
- Draught: 5.6 m (18 ft 4 in)
- Propulsion: 2 × 1,300 bhp (970 kW) diesel engines; 2 × 75 kW Stirling engines; 1 × 1,800 shp (1,300 kW) electric motor, one shaft
- Speed: 10 knots (19 km/h; 12 mph) surfaced; 20 knots (37 km/h; 23 mph) submerged
- Endurance: over 14 days submerged without snorkeling
- Test depth: 500 ft (150 m)
- Complement: 20 officers, 15 enlisted
- Armament: 4 × 533 mm (21 in) torpedo tubes with 12 torpedoes; 2 × 400 mm (15.7 in) torpedo tubes with 6 torpedoes; 48 external mines

HSwMS Uppland (Upd) is one of three Gotland-class submarine built for the Royal Swedish Navy during the Cold War. The motto of HSwMS Uppland is "Prudencia Et Audacia" which translates into "Prudence And Boldness".

== Mid-life upgrade ==
In 2020, HSwMS Uppland underwent a mid-life update. During the upgrade, a number of systems that will be used in the next generation submarines, the Blekinge-class (A26), were installed. More than 20 new systems on board the new Gotland-class was implemented, which contributes to their de-risking for the A26. This also offers training opportunities for the crew when they deploy the A26 in the future.

The upgrade process included many new systems, such as the Stirling AIP, a completely new mast suite, sonars and sensors as well as management and communication systems. In order to accommodate all systems, the submarine has extended to 62 m and gained another 200 tons in weight. In the process HSwMS Uppland reached a displacement (surfaced) of 1580 tons.

== Bibliography ==
- Saunders, Stephen, ed. (2004). Jane's Fighting Ships 2004–2005. Coulsdon, UK: Jane's Information Group. ISBN 0-7106-2623-1.
